= Shooting at the 1900 Summer Olympics – Men's 300 metre free rifle, kneeling =

Sports shooting at the Olympics

Men's 300 metre kneeling free rifle at the Games of the II Olympiad
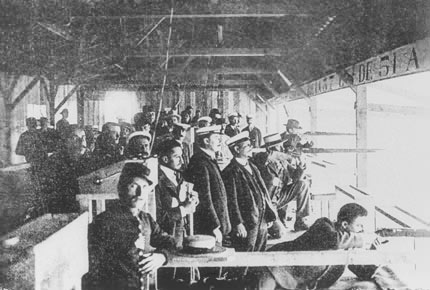
- Shooting at the 1900 Summer Olympics
- Venue: Satory
- Dates: August 3–5, 1900
- Competitors: 30 from 6 nations
- Winning score: 324

Medalists
1st place, gold medalist(s)		Konrad Stäheli; Switzerland
2nd place, silver medalist(s)		Emil Kellenberger; Switzerland
2nd place, silver medalist(s)		Anders Peter Nielsen; Denmark

The men's 300 metre free rifle kneeling event was one of five free rifle events in shooting at the 1900 Summer Olympics in Paris. It was an individual kneeling position event, and competitors' scores also counted towards the individual and team three-position events. It was held from 3 to 5 August. There were 30 competitors from 6 nations, with each nation having a team of 5 shooters. Medals were given for individual high scores in each of the three positions, overall individual high scores, and the scores of the five shooters were summed to give a team score. The kneeling position was won by Konrad Stäheli of Switzerland, with Emil Kellenberger of Switzerland and Anders Peter Nielsen of Denmark tying for silver.

== Background ==
This was the only appearance of the men's 300 metre kneeling rifle event. A three-positions event was also included in 1900 (summing the scores of the standing, kneeling, and prone competitions); the three-positions event continued, but future Games would not have separate kneeling-position events in this format.

Seven of the nine medalists at the world championships since the world championships began in 1897 were competing. The world champions were Frank Jullien of Switzerland (1897, not competing in Paris) and Konrad Stäheli of Switzerland (1898 and 1899). Stäheli was a heavy favourite to win. The Olympic event doubled as the 1900 world championship.

== Competition format ==
The competition had each shooter fire 40 shots from the kneeling position. The target was 1 metre in diameter, with 10 scoring rings; targets were set at a distance of 300 metres. Thus, the maximum score possible was 400 points. The scores from this event were combined with the other two positions (standing and prone) to give a three-positions individual score as well as a team score.

== Schedule ==
Date	Time	Round
Friday, 3 August 1900; Saturday, 4 August 1900; Sunday, 5 August 1900		Final

== Results ==
Each shooter fired 40 shots, for a total possible of 400 points.

Rank	Shooter	Nation	Score
1st place, gold medalist(s)	Konrad Stäheli	Switzerland	324
2nd place, silver medalist(s)	Emil Kellenberger	Switzerland	314
2nd place, silver medalist(s)	Anders Peter Nielsen	Denmark	314
4	Paul Van Asbroeck	Belgium	308
5	Marcus Ravenswaaij	Netherlands	306
6	Uilke Vuurman	Netherlands	303
7	Franz Böckli	Switzerland	300
8	Lars Jørgen Madsen	Denmark	299
9	Charles Paumier	Belgium	297
9	Louis Richardet	Switzerland	297
11	Antonius Bouwens	Netherlands	296
12	Ole Sæther	Norway	293
13	Helmer Hermandsen	Norway	290
13	Viggo Jensen	Denmark	290
15	Ole Østmo	Norway	289
16	Achille Paroche	France	287
17	Auguste Cavadini	France	286
17	Léon Moreaux	France	286
19	Henrik Sillem	Netherlands	281
20	Solko van den Bergh	Netherlands	274
21	Tom Seeberg	Norway	272
22	Laurids Jensen-Kjær	Denmark	271
22	Maurice Lecoq	France	271
24	Jules Bury	Belgium	269
25	Alfred Grütter	Switzerland	265
26	Axel Kristensen	Denmark	260
27	Olaf Frydenlund	Norway	259
27	René Thomas	France	259
29	Edouard Myin	Belgium	249
30	Joseph Baras	Belgium	210
