= Shooting at the 1900 Summer Olympics – Men's 300 metre free rifle, standing =

Sports shooting at the Olympics

Men's 300 metre standing free rifle at the Games of the II Olympiad
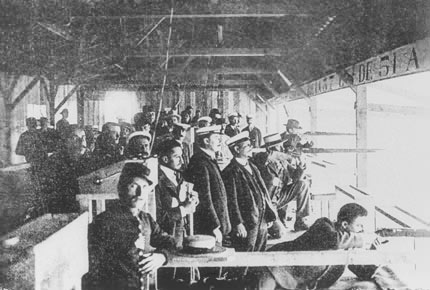
- Shooting at the 1900 Summer Olympics
- Venue: Satory
- Dates: August 3–5, 1900
- Competitors: 30 from 6 nations
- Winning score: 305

Medalists
| 1st place, gold medalist(s) | | Lars Jørgen Madsen; Denmark |
| 2nd place, silver medalist(s) | | Ole Østmo; Norway |
| 3rd place, bronze medalist(s) | | Charles Paumier; Belgium |

The men's 300 metre free rifle standing event was one of five free rifle events of the competitions in the Shooting at the 1900 Summer Olympics events in Paris. It was held from August 3 to August 5, 1900. 30 shooters from 6 nations competed, with five shooters per team. Medals were given for individual high scores in each of the three positions, overall individual high scores, and the scores of the five shooters were summed to give a team score. The standing position was won by Lars Jørgen Madsen of Denmark, with Ole Østmo of Norway taking silver and Charles Paumier of Belgium bronze.

== Background ==
This was the only appearance of the men's 300 metre standing rifle event. A three-positions event was also included in 1900 (summing the scores of the standing, kneeling, and prone competitions); the three-positions event continued, but future Games would not have separate standing-position events in this format.

Eight of the nine medalists at the world championships since the world championships began in 1897 were competing. The world champions were Ole Østmo of Norway (1897), Achille Paroche of France (1898), and Franz Böckli of Switzerland (1899). The Olympic event doubled as the 1900 world championship.

== Competition format ==
The competition had each shooter fire 40 shots from the standing position. The target was 1 metre in diameter, with 10 scoring rings; targets were set at a distance of 300 metres. Thus, the maximum score possible was 400 points. The scores from this event were combined with the other two positions (kneeling and prone) to give a three-positions individual score as well as a team score.

== Schedule ==
| Date | Time | Round |
|---|---|---|
| Friday, 3 August 1900; Saturday, 4 August 1900; Sunday, 5 August 1900 | | Final |

== Results ==
Each shooter fired 40 shots, for a total possible of 400 points.

| Rank | Shooter | Nation | Score |
|---|---|---|---|
| 1st place, gold medalist(s) | Lars Jørgen Madsen | Denmark | 305 |
| 2nd place, silver medalist(s) | Ole Østmo | Norway | 299 |
| 3rd place, bronze medalist(s) | Charles Paumier | Belgium | 298 |
| 4 | Paul Van Asbroeck | Belgium | 297 |
| 5 | Franz Böckli | Switzerland | 294 |
| 6 | Emil Kellenberger | Switzerland | 292 |
| 7 | Jules Bury | Belgium | 282 |
| 7 | Alfred Grütter | Switzerland | 282 |
| 9 | Helmer Hermandsen | Norway | 280 |
| 10 | Auguste Cavadini | France | 278 |
| 11 | Viggo Jensen | Denmark | 277 |
| 11 | Anders Peter Nielsen | Denmark | 277 |
| 13 | Tom Seeberg | Norway | 275 |
| 14 | Marcus Ravenswaaij | Netherlands | 272 |
| 14 | Konrad Stäheli | Switzerland | 272 |
| 16 | Olaf Frydenlund | Norway | 271 |
| 17 | Léon Moreaux | France | 269 |
| 17 | Louis Richardet | Switzerland | 269 |
| 19 | Maurice Lecoq | France | 268 |
| 19 | Achille Paroche | France | 268 |
| 21 | Edouard Myin | Belgium | 265 |
| 22 | Axel Kristensen | Denmark | 261 |
| 22 | Uilke Vuurman | Netherlands | 261 |
| 24 | René Thomas | France | 254 |
| 25 | Henrik Sillem | Netherlands | 249 |
| 26 | Ole Sæther | Norway | 239 |
| 26 | Solko van den Bergh | Netherlands | 239 |
| 28 | Laurids Jensen-Kjær | Denmark | 238 |
| 28 | Antonius Bouwens | Netherlands | 238 |
| 30 | Joseph Baras | Belgium | 233 |
