= Shooting at the 1900 Summer Olympics – Men's 300 metre free rifle, three positions =

Olympic shooting event

Men's 300 metre three positions free rifle at the Games of the II Olympiad
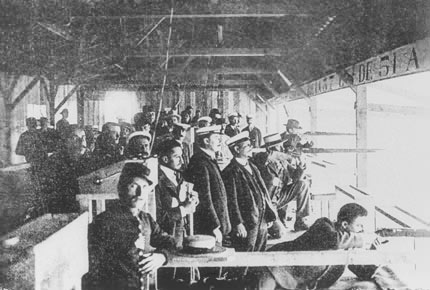
- Shooting at the 1900 Summer Olympics
- Venue: Satory
- Date: August 3–5, 1900
- Competitors: 30 from 6 nations
- Winning score: 930

Medalists
1st place, gold medalist(s)		Emil Kellenberger; Switzerland
2nd place, silver medalist(s)		Anders Peter Nielsen; Denmark
3rd place, bronze medalist(s)		Paul Van Asbroeck; Belgium
3rd place, bronze medalist(s)		Ole Østmo; Norway

The 300 m rifle three positions event was one of five free rifle events of the competitions in the Shooting at the 1900 Summer Olympics events in Paris. They were held from August 3 to August 5, 1900. 30 shooters from 6 nations competed, with five shooters per team. Medals were given for individual high scores in each of the three positions, overall individual high scores, and the scores of the five shooters were summed to give a team score. The three positions event was won by Emil Kellenberger of Switzerland. Anders Peter Nielsen of Denmark took silver, while Ole Østmo of Norway and Paul Van Asbroeck of Belgium tied for bronze.

== Background ==
This was the first appearance of the men's 300 metre three-positions rifle event, which was held 11 times between 1900 and 1972. Two of the three world champions since the world championships began in 1897 were competing: Achille Paroche of France (1898) and Lars Jørgen Madsen of Denmark (1899); of the total nine medalists to date, seven competed at the Olympics. The Olympic event doubled as the 1900 world championship.

== Competition format ==
The competition had each shooter fire 120 shots, 40 shots in each of three positions: prone, kneeling, and standing. The target was 1 metre in diameter, with 10 scoring rings; targets were set at a distance of 300 metres. Thus, the maximum score possible was 1200 points. Medals were also awarded for team results, adding the individual three-positions scores together. For the only time in Olympic history, medals were awarded for scores in each of the three positions.

== Records ==
Prior to the competition, the existing world and Olympic records were as follows.

World record				
Olympic record	New format	n/a	n/a	n/a

Emil Kellenberger set the initial Olympic record for the 120-shot format at 930 points.

== Schedule ==
Date	Time	Round
Friday, 3 August 1900; Saturday, 4 August 1900; Sunday, 5 August 1900		Final

== Results ==
The scores from the three positions were summed, giving a total possible of 1200 points.

Rank	Shooter	Nation	Standing		Kneeling		Prone		Total
Rank	Shooter	Nation	Score	Rank	Score	Rank	Score	Rank	Total
1st place, gold medalist(s)	Emil Kellenberger	Switzerland	292	6	314	2	324	5	930
2nd place, silver medalist(s)	Anders Peter Nielsen	Denmark	277	11	314	2	330	2	921
3rd place, bronze medalist(s)	Paul Van Asbroeck	Belgium	297	4	308	4	312	8	917
3rd place, bronze medalist(s)	Ole Østmo	Norway	299	2	289	15	329	3	917
5	Lars Jørgen Madsen	Denmark	305	1	299	8	301	16	905
6	Charles Paumier	Belgium	298	3	297	9	302	15	897
7	Achille Paroche	France	268	19	287	16	332	1	887
8	Franz Böckli	Switzerland	294	5	300	7	289	21	883
9	Marcus Ravenswaaij	Netherlands	272	14	306	5	303	14	881
9	Konrad Stäheli	Switzerland	272	14	324	1	285	23	881
11	Auguste Cavadini	France	278	10	286	17	316	7	880
11	Léon Moreaux	France	269	17	286	17	325	4	880
13	Helmer Hermandsen	Norway	280	9	290	13	308	10	878
14	Uilke Vuurman	Netherlands	261	22	303	6	312	8	876
15	Viggo Jensen	Denmark	277	11	290	13	308	10	875
16	Louis Richardet	Switzerland	269	17	297	9	307	12	873
17	Tom Seeberg	Norway	275	13	272	21	301	16	848
18	Henrik Sillem	Netherlands	249	25	281	19	317	6	847
19	Alfred Grütter	Switzerland	282	7	265	25	285	23	832
20	Ole Sæther	Norway	239	26	293	12	298	18	830
21	Maurice Lecoq	France	268	19	271	22	284	25	823
22	Jules Bury	Belgium	282	7	269	24	270	28	821
23	Edouard Myin	Belgium	265	21	249	29	304	13	818
24	Olaf Frydenlund	Norway	271	16	259	27	287	22	817
25	Antonius Bouwens	Netherlands	238	28	296	11	278	26	812
26	René Thomas	France	254	24	259	27	295	19	808
27	Solko van den Bergh	Netherlands	239	26	274	20	292	20	805
28	Laurids Jensen-Kjær	Denmark	238	28	271	22	273	27	782
28	Axel Kristensen	Denmark	261	22	260	26	261	30	782
30	Joseph Baras	Belgium	233	30	210	30	270	28	713
