= Free pistol at the Olympics =

Olympic sport

ISSF 50 meter pistol at the Olympic Games
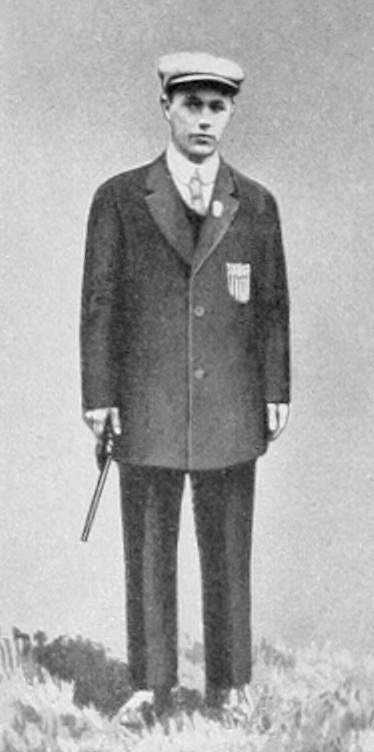
- Alfred Lane, 1912 Olympic pistol champion

Overview
- Sport: Shooting
- Gender: Men
- Years held: Men: 1896, 1900, 1908–1920, 1936–2016

Reigning champion
- Men: Jin Jong-oh (KOR)

The "free" pistol is former and still unofficially used name for the men's ISSF 50 meter pistol competition held at the Olympics. "Free" pistol is used to distinguish between other pistol disciplines (air, rapid fire, standard, sport, military/centre-fire). The competition was first held at the inaugural 1896 Olympics (at 30 metres) and then held at 50 metres (or yards, in 1908) each time that shooting was on the programme (that is, excluding 1904) until 1920. It was dropped from the programme for amateurism reasons from 1924 to 1932, but returned in 1936. It was held again at every Games from then until 2016; the event, which had no women's equivalent, was dropped after 2016 to make room for a mixed team air pistol event as the sport moved toward gender equality. In all, the event was held 24 times. The event was open to women from 1968 to 1980, although very few women participated these years.

A team event was held four times from 1904 to 1920.

== Medals ==
=== Men ===
Games	Gold	Silver	Bronze
1896 Athens	Sumner Paine; United States	Holger Nielsen; Denmark	Ioannis Frangoudis; Greece
1900 Paris	Karl Röderer; Switzerland	Achille Paroche; France	Konrad Stäheli; Switzerland
1904 St. Louis	Not held		
1908 London	Paul Van Asbroeck; Belgium	Réginald Storms; Belgium	James Gorman; United States
1912 Stockholm	Alfred Lane; United States	Peter Dolfen; United States	Charles Stewart; Great Britain
1920 Antwerp	Karl Frederick; United States	Afrânio da Costa; Brazil	Alfred Lane; United States
1924 Paris	Not held		
1928 Amsterdam	Not held		
1932 Los Angeles	Not held		
1936 Berlin	Torsten Ullman; Sweden	Erich Krempel; Germany	Charles des Jammonières; France
1948 London	Edwin Vásquez; Peru	Rudolf Schnyder; Switzerland	Torsten Ullman; Sweden
1952 Helsinki	Huelet Benner; United States	Ángel León; Spain	Ambrus Balogh; Hungary
1956 Melbourne	Pentti Linnosvuo; Finland	Makhmud Umarov; Soviet Union	Offutt Pinion; United States
1960 Rome	Aleksey Gushchin; Soviet Union	Makhmud Umarov; Soviet Union	Yoshihisa Yoshikawa; Japan
1964 Tokyo	Väinö Markkanen; Finland	Franklin Green; United States	Yoshihisa Yoshikawa; Japan
1968 Mexico City (mixed)	Grigory Kosykh; Soviet Union	Heinz Mertel; West Germany	Harald Vollmar; East Germany
1972 Munich (mixed)	Ragnar Skanåker; Sweden	Daniel Iuga; Romania	Rudolf Dollinger; Austria
1976 Montreal (mixed)	Uwe Potteck; East Germany	Harald Vollmar; East Germany	Rudolf Dollinger; Austria
1980 Moscow (mixed)	Aleksandr Melentyev; Soviet Union	Harald Vollmar; East Germany	Lyubcho Dyakov; Bulgaria
1984 Los Angeles	Xu Haifeng; China	Ragnar Skanåker; Sweden	Wang Yifu; China
1988 Seoul	Sorin Babii; Romania	Ragnar Skanåker; Sweden	Igor Basinski; Soviet Union
1992 Barcelona	Kanstantsin Lukashyk; Unified Team	Wang Yifu; China	Ragnar Skanåker; Sweden
1996 Atlanta	Boris Kokorev; Russia	Igor Basinski; Belarus	Roberto Di Donna; Italy
2000 Sydney	Tanyu Kiryakov; Bulgaria	Igor Basinski; Belarus	Martin Tenk; Czech Republic
2004 Athens	Mikhail Nestruyev; Russia	Jin Jong-oh; South Korea	Kim Jong-su; North Korea
2008 Beijing	Jin Jong-oh; South Korea	Tan Zongliang; China	Vladimir Isakov; Russia
2012 London	Jin Jong-Oh; South Korea	Choi Young-Rae; South Korea	Wang Zhiwei; China
2016 Rio de Janeiro	Jin Jong-oh; South Korea	Hoàng Xuân Vinh; Vietnam	Kim Song-guk; North Korea

==== Multiple medalists ====
Rank	Gymnast	Nation	Olympics	Gold	Silver	Bronze	Total
1	Jin Jong-oh	South Korea	2004–2016	3	1	0	4
2	Ragnar Skanåker	Sweden	1972, 1984–1992	1	2	1	4
3	Alfred Lane	United States	1912–1920	1	0	1	2
3	Torsten Ullman	Sweden	1936–1948	1	0	1	2
5	Harald Vollmar	East Germany	1968, 1976–1980	0	2	1	3
5	Igor Basinski	Soviet Union; Belarus	1988, 1996–2000	0	2	1	3
7	Makhmud Umarov	Soviet Union	1956–1960	0	2	0	2
8	Wang Yifu	China	1988–1992	0	1	1	2
9	Yoshihisa Yoshikawa	Japan	1960–1964	0	0	2	2
9	Rudolf Dollinger	Austria	1972–1976	0	0	2	2

==== Medalists by nation ====
Rank	Nation	Gold	Silver	Bronze	Total
1	United States	4	2	3	9
2	Soviet Union	3	2	1	6
3	South Korea	3	2	0	5
4	Sweden	2	2	2	6
5	Russia	2	0	1	3
6	Finland	2	0	0	2
7	China	1	2	2	5
8	East Germany	1	2	1	4
9	Switzerland	1	1	1	3
10	Belgium	1	1	0	2
10	Romania	1	1	0	2
12	Bulgaria	1	0	1	2
13	Peru	1	0	0	1
13	Unified Team	1	0	0	1
15	Belarus	0	2	0	2
16	France	0	1	1	2
17	Brazil	0	1	0	1
17	Denmark	0	1	0	1
17	Germany	0	1	0	1
17	West Germany	0	1	0	1
17	Spain	0	1	0	1
17	Vietnam	0	1	0	1
23	Austria	0	0	2	2
23	Japan	0	0	2	2
23	North Korea	0	0	2	2
26	Czech Republic	0	0	1	1
26	Great Britain	0	0	1	1
26	Greece	0	0	1	1
26	Hungary	0	0	1	1
26	Italy	0	0	1	1

== Team pistol ==
=== Men ===
Games	Gold	Silver	Bronze
1900 Paris	Friedrich Lüthi, Paul Probst, Louis Richardet, Karl Röderer, Konrad Stäheli; Switzerland	Louis Duffoy, Maurice Lecoq, Léon Moreaux, Achille Paroche, Jules Trinité; France	Solko van den Bergh, Antonius Bouwens, Dirk Boest Gips, Henrik Sillem, Anthony Sweijs; Netherlands
1908 London	Charles Axtell, Irving Calkins, John Dietz, James Gorman; United States	René Englebert, Charles Paumier du Verger, Réginald Storms, Paul Van Asbroeck; Belgium	Geoffrey Coles, William Ellicott, Henry Lynch-Staunton, Jesse Wallingford; Great Britain
1912 Stockholm	John Dietz, Peter Dolfen, Alfred Lane, Henry Sears; United States	Erik Boström, Eric Carlberg, Vilhelm Carlberg, Georg de Laval; Sweden	Hugh Durant, Albert Kempster, Horatio Poulter, Charles Stewart; Great Britain
1920 Antwerp	Raymond Bracken, Karl Frederick, Michael Kelly, Alfred Lane, James H. Snook; United States	Anders Andersson, Gunnar Gabrielsson, Sigvard Hultcrantz, Anders Johnson, Casimir Reuterskiöld; Sweden	Dario Barbosa, Afrânio da Costa, Guilherme Paraense, Fernando Soledade, Sebastião Wolf; Brazil

==== Multiple medalists ====
Rank	Gymnast	Nation	Olympics	Gold	Silver	Bronze	Total
1	John Dietz	United States	1908–1912	2	0	0	2
1	Alfred Lane	United States	1912–1920	2	0	0	2

==== Medalists by nation ====
Rank	Nation	Gold	Silver	Bronze	Total
1	United States	3	0	0	3
2	Switzerland	1	0	0	1
3	Sweden	0	2	0	2
4	Belgium	0	1	0	1
4	France	0	1	0	1
6	Great Britain	0	0	2	2
7	Brazil	0	0	1	1
7	Netherlands	0	0	1	1
