= Shooting at the 1900 Summer Olympics – Men's 300 metre free rifle, prone =

Sports shooting at the Olympics

Men's 300 metre prone free rifle at the Games of the II Olympiad
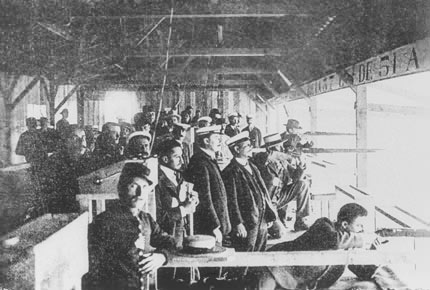
- Shooting at the 1900 Summer Olympics
- Venue: Satory
- Dates: August 3–5, 1900
- Competitors: 30 from 6 nations
- Winning score: 332

Medalists
1st place, gold medalist(s)		Achille Paroche; France
2nd place, silver medalist(s)		Anders Peter Nielsen; Denmark
3rd place, bronze medalist(s)		Ole Østmo; Norway

The men's 300 metre free rifle prone event was one of five free rifle events of the competitions in the Shooting at the 1900 Summer Olympics events in Paris. It was held from August 3 to August 5, 1900. 30 shooters from 6 nations competed, with five shooters per team. Medals were given for individual high scores in each of the three positions, overall individual high scores, and the scores of the five shooters were summed to give a team score. Achille Paroche of France won the gold medal in the prone event, with Anders Peter Nielsen of Denmark taking silver and Ole Østmo bronze.

== Background ==
This was the only appearance of the men's 300 metre prone rifle event. A three-positions event was also included in 1900 (summing the scores of the standing, kneeling, and prone competitions); the three-positions event continued, but future Games would not have separate prone-position events in this format.

Léon Moreaux of France was the 1898 World Champion, the only world champion to compete in Paris. Reigning world champion Jesse Wallingford of Great Britain did not compete. The Olympic event doubled as the 1900 world championship.

== Competition format ==
The competition had each shooter fire 40 shots from the prone position. The target was 1 metre in diameter, with 10 scoring rings; targets were set at a distance of 300 metres. Thus, the maximum score possible was 400 points. The scores from this event were combined with the other two positions (standing and kneeling) to give a three-positions individual score as well as a team score.

== Schedule ==
Date	Time	Round
Friday, 3 August 1900; Saturday, 4 August 1900; Sunday, 5 August 1900		Final

== Results ==
Each shooter fired 40 shots, for a total possible of 400 points.

Rank	Shooter	Nation	Score
1st place, gold medalist(s)	Achille Paroche	France	332
2nd place, silver medalist(s)	Anders Peter Nielsen	Denmark	330
3rd place, bronze medalist(s)	Ole Østmo	Norway	329
4	Léon Moreaux	France	325
5	Emil Kellenberger	Switzerland	324
6	Henrik Sillem	Netherlands	317
7	Auguste Cavadini	France	316
8	Paul Van Asbroeck	Belgium	312
8	Uilke Vuurman	Netherlands	312
10	Helmer Hermandsen	Norway	308
10	Viggo Jensen	Denmark	308
12	Louis Richardet	Switzerland	307
13	Edouard Myin	Belgium	304
14	Marcus Ravenswaaij	Netherlands	303
15	Charles Paumier	Belgium	302
16	Lars Jørgen Madsen	Denmark	301
16	Tom Seeberg	Norway	301
18	Ole Sæther	Norway	298
19	René Thomas	France	295
20	Solko van den Bergh	Netherlands	292
21	Franz Böckli	Switzerland	289
22	Olaf Frydenlund	Norway	287
23	Alfred Grütter	Switzerland	285
23	Konrad Stäheli	Switzerland	285
25	Maurice Lecoq	France	284
26	Antonius Bouwens	Netherlands	278
27	Laurids Jensen-Kjær	Denmark	273
28	Joseph Baras	Belgium	270
28	Jules Bury	Belgium	270
30	Axel Kristensen	Denmark	261
