= Shooting at the 1900 Summer Olympics – Men's 300 metre free rifle, team =

Olympic shooting event

Men's 300 metre team free rifle at the Games of the II Olympiad
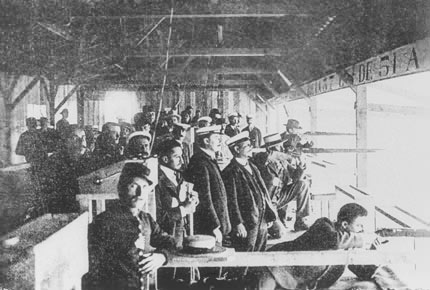
- Shooting at the 1900 Summer Olympics
- Venue: Satory
- Dates: August 3–5, 1900
- Competitors: 30 from 6 nations
- Winning score: 4399

Medalists
1st place, gold medalist(s)		Switzerland: Emil Kellenberger; Franz Böckli; Konrad Stäheli; Louis Richardet; Alfred Grütter
2nd place, silver medalist(s)		Norway: Ole Østmo; Helmer Hermandsen; Tom Seeberg; Ole Sæther; Olaf Frydenlund
3rd place, bronze medalist(s)		France: Achille Paroche; Auguste Cavadini; Léon Moreaux; Maurice Lecoq; René Thomas

The men's 300 metre team free rifle event was one of five free rifle events of the competitions in the Shooting at the 1900 Summer Olympics events in Paris. It was held from August 3 to August 5, 1900. 30 shooters from 6 nations competed, with five shooters per team. Medals were given for individual high scores in each of the three positions, overall individual high scores, and the scores of the five shooters were summed to give a team score. The top scoring team was Switzerland, led by individual champion Emil Kellenberger. Silver went to Norway, while France took bronze.

== Background ==
This was the first appearance of the men's 300 metre team rifle event, which was held 4 times between 1900 and 1920. The favourite was Switzerland, who had won two of the three world championships (1897 and 1899) to date and taken bronze in the third (1898). France had also reached the podium all three times, winning in 1898.

== Competition format ==
The competition had each shooter fire 120 shots, 40 shots in each of three positions: prone, kneeling, and standing. The target was 1 metre in diameter, with 10 scoring rings; targets were set at a distance of 300 metres. The five team members' scores were then summed. Thus, the maximum score possible was 6000 points. Medals were also awarded for individual three-positions scores. For the only time in Olympic history, medals were awarded for scores in each of the three positions.

== Schedule ==
Date	Time	Round
Friday, 3 August 1900; Saturday, 4 August 1900; Sunday, 5 August 1900		Final

== Results ==
The scores of the five shooters on each team were summed to give a team score. No further shooting was done. The maximum score was 6000.

Rank	Nation	Shooter	Standing		Kneeling		Prone		Total
Rank	Nation	Shooter	Score	Rank	Score	Rank	Score	Rank	Total
1st place, gold medalist(s)	Switzerland	Switzerland total	1409	1	1500	1	1490	4	4399
1st place, gold medalist(s)	Switzerland	Emil Kellenberger	292	6	314	2	324	5	930
1st place, gold medalist(s)	Switzerland	Franz Böckli	294	5	300	7	289	21	883
1st place, gold medalist(s)	Switzerland	Konrad Stäheli	272	14	324	1	285	23	881
1st place, gold medalist(s)	Switzerland	Louis Richardet	269	17	297	9	307	12	873
1st place, gold medalist(s)	Switzerland	Alfred Grütter	282	7	265	25	285	23	832
2nd place, silver medalist(s)	Norway	Norway total	1364	3	1403	4	1523	2	4290
2nd place, silver medalist(s)	Norway	Ole Østmo	299	2	289	15	329	3	917
2nd place, silver medalist(s)	Norway	Helmer Hermandsen	280	9	290	13	308	10	878
2nd place, silver medalist(s)	Norway	Tom Seeberg	275	13	272	21	301	16	848
2nd place, silver medalist(s)	Norway	Ole Sæther	239	26	293	12	298	18	830
2nd place, silver medalist(s)	Norway	Olaf Frydenlund	271	16	259	27	287	22	817
3rd place, bronze medalist(s)	France	France total	1337	5	1389	5	1552	1	4278
3rd place, bronze medalist(s)	France	Achille Paroche	268	19	287	16	332	1	887
3rd place, bronze medalist(s)	France	Auguste Cavadini	278	10	286	17	316	7	880
3rd place, bronze medalist(s)	France	Léon Moreaux	269	17	286	17	325	4	880
3rd place, bronze medalist(s)	France	Maurice Lecoq	268	19	271	22	284	25	823
3rd place, bronze medalist(s)	France	René Thomas	254	24	259	27	295	19	808
4	Denmark	Denmark total	1358	4	1434	3	1473	5	4265
4	Denmark	Anders Peter Nielsen	277	11	314	2	330	2	921
4	Denmark	Lars Jørgen Madsen	305	1	299	8	301	16	905
4	Denmark	Viggo Jensen	277	11	290	13	308	10	875
4	Denmark	Laurids Jensen-Kjær	238	28	271	22	273	27	782
4	Denmark	Axel Kristensen	261	22	260	26	261	30	782
5	Netherlands	Netherlands total	1259	6	1460	2	1502	3	4221
5	Netherlands	Marcus Ravenswaaij	272	14	306	5	303	14	881
5	Netherlands	Uilke Vuurman	261	22	303	6	312	8	876
5	Netherlands	Henrik Sillem	249	25	281	19	317	6	847
5	Netherlands	Antonius Bouwens	238	28	296	11	278	26	812
5	Netherlands	Solko van den Bergh	239	26	274	20	292	20	805
6	Belgium	Belgium total	1375	2	1333	6	1458	6	4166
6	Belgium	Paul Van Asbroeck	297	4	308	4	312	8	917
6	Belgium	Charles Paumier	298	3	297	9	302	15	897
6	Belgium	Jules Bury	282	7	269	24	270	28	821
6	Belgium	Edouard Myin	265	21	249	29	304	13	818
6	Belgium	Joseph Baras	233	30	210	30	270	28	713
