= Shooting at the 1900 Summer Olympics – Men's 50 metre pistol =

Olympic shooting event

Men's 50 metre free pistol at the Games of the II Olympiad
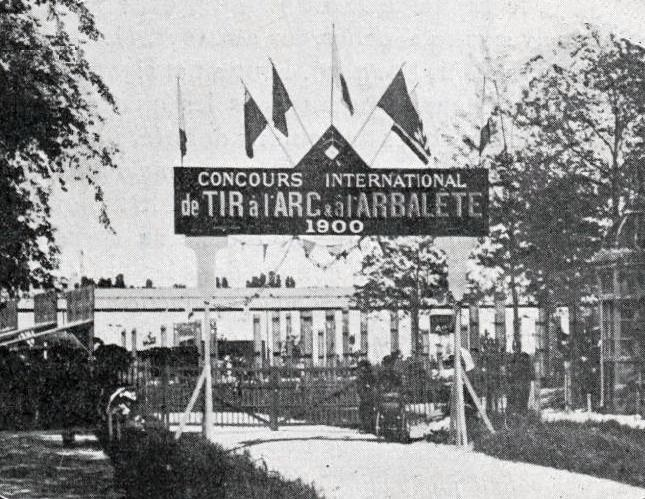
- Entrance to the target stand
- Venue: Satory
- Date: August 1, 1900
- Competitors: 20 from 4 nations
- Winning score: 503 OR

Medalists
| 1st place, gold medalist(s) | | Karl Röderer; Switzerland |
| 2nd place, silver medalist(s) | | Achille Paroche; France |
| 3rd place, bronze medalist(s) | | Konrad Stäheli; Switzerland |

The men's individual competition with free revolver event was one of the competitions in the Shooting at the 1900 Summer Olympics events in Paris. It was held on 1 August 1900. 20 shooters from 4 nations competed, with five shooters per nation. Medals were given for individual high scores, and the scores of the five shooters were summed to give a team score for the team event. The target designed for this competition is still being used today. The event was won by Karl Röderer of Switzerland, with his countryman Konrad Stäheli taking bronze. Between them was Achille Paroche of France with silver.

== Background ==
This was the second appearance of what would become standardised as the men's ISSF 50 meter pistol event. The event was held at every Summer Olympics from 1896 to 1920 (except 1904, when no shooting events were held) and from 1936 to 2016; it was open to women from 1968 to 1980.

All four of the competing nations were making their debut; none had a shooter in this event in 1896. The event doubled as the first World Championship in free pistol.

Röderer used a Waffenfabrik Bern 1882 Swiss Ordnance Revolver.

== Competition format ==
The competition had each shooter fire 60 shots at a distance of 50 metres. The target was round, 50 centimetres in diameter, with 10 scoring rings. Scoring for each shot was up to 10 points, in increments of 1 point. The maximum score possible was 600 points.

Revolver must have a barrel of 11 cm in length. Ties were broken by greatest number of shots on target (1 or better), then greatest number in the black (7 or better), then by ring (10, 9, 8, etc.).

== Records ==
Prior to this competition, the existing world and Olympic records were as follows.

| World record | |
| Olympic record | New format |

Karl Röderer set the initial Olympic record with 503 points.

== Schedule ==
| Date | Time | Round |
|---|---|---|
| Wednesday, 1 August 1900 | 8:00 | Final |

== Results ==
| Rank | Shooter | Nation | Score |
|---|---|---|---|
| 1st place, gold medalist(s) | Karl Röderer | Switzerland | 503 |
| 2nd place, silver medalist(s) | Achille Paroche | France | 466 |
| 3rd place, bronze medalist(s) | Konrad Stäheli | Switzerland | 453 |
| 4 | Louis Richardet | Switzerland | 448 |
| 5 | Louis Duffoy | France | 442 |
| 6 | Dirk Boest Gips | Netherlands | 437 |
| 7 | Friedrich Lüthi | Switzerland | 435 |
| 7 | Léon Moreaux | France | 435 |
| 9 | Paul Probst | Switzerland | 432 |
| 10 | Jules Trinité | France | 431 |
| 11 | Maurice Lecoq | France | 429 |
| 12 | Henrik Sillem | Netherlands | 408 |
| 13 | Alban Rooman | Belgium | 405 |
| 14 | Émile Thèves | Belgium | 404 |
| 15 | Antonius Bouwens | Netherlands | 390 |
| 16 | Victor Robert | Belgium | 351 |
| 17 | Pierre Eichhorn | Belgium | 345 |
| 18 | Solko van den Bergh | Netherlands | 331 |
| 19 | Charles Lebègue | Belgium | 318 |
| 20 | Anthony Sweijs | Netherlands | 310 |
