= Switzerland at the 1900 Summer Olympics =

- IOC code: SUI
- NOC: Swiss Olympic Association

in Paris
- Competitors: 18 in 4 sports
- Medals Ranked 5th: Gold 6 Silver 3 Bronze 1 Total 10

Summer Olympics appearances (overview)
- 1896; 1900; 1904; 1908; 1912; 1920; 1924; 1928; 1932; 1936; 1948; 1952; 1956; 1960; 1964; 1968; 1972; 1976; 1980; 1984; 1988; 1992; 1996; 2000; 2004; 2008; 2012; 2016; 2020; 2024; 2028

Other related appearances
- 1906 Intercalated Games

Switzerland competed at the 1900 Summer Olympics in Paris, France.

== Medalists ==
Gold medals were not awarded at the 1900 Games. A silver medal was given for a first place, and a bronze medal was given for second. The International Olympic Committee (IOC) has retroactively assigned gold, silver, and bronze medals to competitors who earned 1st, 2nd, and 3rd-place finishes, respectively, in order to bring early Olympics in line with current awards.

Medal	Name	Sport	Event	Date
Gold	Bernard de Pourtalès; Hélène de Pourtalès; Hermann de Pourtalès	Sailing	1–2 ton class race 1	May 22
Gold	Karl Röderer	Shooting	50 metre pistol	August 1
Gold	Friedrich Lüthi; Paul Probst; Louis Richardet; Karl Röderer; Konrad Stäheli	Shooting	50 metre team pistol	August 1
Gold	Emil Kellenberger	Shooting	300 metre free rifle, three positions	August 5
Gold	Konrad Stäheli	Shooting	300 metre free rifle, kneeling	August 5
Gold	Franz Böckli; Alfred Grütter; Emil Kellenberger; Louis Richardet; Konrad Stäheli	Shooting	300 metre team free rifle	August 5
Silver	Bernard de Pourtalès; Hélène de Pourtalès; Hermann de Pourtalès	Sailing	1–2 ton class race 2	May 27
Silver	Emil Kellenberger	Shooting	300 metre free rifle, kneeling	August 5
Silver	Pauline Whittier (USA) (Note: At the time of the 1900 Olympic golf event, Pauline Whittier was a US citizen but was living in Switzerland and playing her golf at the St. Moritz Golf Club. Therefore, the IOC counts this medal for Switzerland.)	Golf	Women's individual	October 3
Bronze	Konrad Stäheli	Shooting	50 metre pistol	August 1

== Results by event ==
=== Fencing ===
Switzerland first competed in fencing at the Olympics, in the sport's second appearance. The nation sent three fencers.

Fencer	Event	Round 1		Quarterfinals		Repechage		Semifinals		Final	
Fencer	Event	Result	Rank	Result	Rank	Result	Rank	Result	Rank	Result	Rank
Paul Robert	Men's épée	Unknown	4th–6th	did not advance		—N/a		did not advance			
Paul Robert	Men's foil	Advanced		Not advanced		did not advance					
Jean Weill	Men's foil	Not advanced		did not advance							
François de Boffa	Men's sabre	Unknown	5th–6th	—N/a				did not advance			

=== Gymnastics ===
Switzerland competed again at the second gymnastics competition. This time, the nation won no medals in a heavily France-dominated single event.

Gymnast	Event	Score	Rank
Charles Broadbeck	Men's all-around	245	43
Jules Ducret	Men's all-around	264	19
Oscar Jeanfavre	Men's all-around	261	23

=== Sailing ===
Switzerland had one boat compete in 1900, racing three times. The Lérina took gold in the first 1–2 ton race and added a silver medal in the second 1–2 ton race, but she did not finish in the open class. Sailing was the first of the sports open to women to be contested, making Hélène de Pourtalès the first female Olympian, Olympic medalist, and Olympic champion.

Sailors	Event	Time	Rank
Bernard de Pourtalès; Hélène de Pourtalès; Hermann de Pourtalès	1–2 ton class race 1	2:15:32	1st place, gold medalist(s)
Bernard de Pourtalès; Hélène de Pourtalès; Hermann de Pourtalès	1–2 ton class race 2	3:35:14	2nd place, silver medalist(s)
Bernard de Pourtalès; Hélène de Pourtalès; Hermann de Pourtalès	Open class	DNF	—

=== Shooting ===
After winning no medals in the first Olympic shooting competitions, Switzerland dominated the second edition of the events, winning five of the nine events, as well as taking two other medals. The Swiss shooters took gold medals in both of the team events, as well as the individual gold medals in military pistol, kneeling military rifle, and overall military rifle.

Shooter	Event	Score	Rank
Paul Probst	Men's 20 metre rapid fire pistol	57	5
Friedrich Lüthi	Men's 50 metre free pistol	435	7
Paul Probst	Men's 50 metre free pistol	432	9
Louis Richardet	Men's 50 metre free pistol	448	4
Karl Röderer	Men's 50 metre free pistol	503	1st place, gold medalist(s)
Konrad Stäheli	Men's 50 metre free pistol	453	3rd place, bronze medalist(s)
Friedrich Lüthi; Paul Probst; Louis Richardet; Karl Röderer; Konrad Stäheli	Men's 50 metre free pistol, team	2271	1st place, gold medalist(s)
Franz Böckli	Men's 300 metre free rifle, standing	294	5
Alfred Grütter	Men's 300 metre free rifle, standing	282	7
Emil Kellenberger	Men's 300 metre free rifle, standing	292	6
Louis Richardet	Men's 300 metre free rifle, standing	269	17
Konrad Stäheli	Men's 300 metre free rifle, standing	272	14
Franz Böckli	Men's 300 metre free rifle, kneeling	300	7
Alfred Grütter	Men's 300 metre free rifle, kneeling	265	25
Emil Kellenberger	Men's 300 metre free rifle, kneeling	314	2nd place, silver medalist(s)
Louis Richardet	Men's 300 metre free rifle, kneeling	297	9
Konrad Stäheli	Men's 300 metre free rifle, kneeling	324	1st place, gold medalist(s)
Franz Böckli	Men's 300 metre free rifle, prone	289	21
Alfred Grütter	Men's 300 metre free rifle, prone	285	23
Emil Kellenberger	Men's 300 metre free rifle, prone	324	5
Louis Richardet	Men's 300 metre free rifle, prone	307	12
Konrad Stäheli	Men's 300 metre free rifle, prone	285	23
Franz Böckli	Men's 300 metre free rifle, three positions	883	8
Alfred Grütter	Men's 300 metre free rifle, three positions	832	19
Emil Kellenberger	Men's 300 metre free rifle, three positions	930	1st place, gold medalist(s)
Louis Richardet	Men's 300 metre free rifle, three positions	873	16
Konrad Stäheli	Men's 300 metre free rifle, three positions	881	9
Franz Böckli; Alfred Grütter; Emil Kellenberger; Louis Richardet; Konrad Stäheli	Men's 300 metre free rifle, team	4399	1st place, gold medalist(s)
