= Netherlands at the 1900 Summer Olympics =

- Flag of the Netherlands
- IOC code: NED

in Paris
- Competitors: 29 in 6 sports
- Medals Ranked 9th: Gold 1 Silver 2 Bronze 3 Total 6

Summer Olympics appearances (overview)
- 1900; 1904; 1908; 1912; 1920; 1924; 1928; 1932; 1936; 1948; 1952; 1956; 1960; 1964; 1968; 1972; 1976; 1980; 1984; 1988; 1992; 1996; 2000; 2004; 2008; 2012; 2016; 2020; 2024

Other related appearances
- 1906 Intercalated Games

The Netherlands first competed at the Summer Olympic Games at the 1900 Summer Olympics in Paris, France.

== Medalists ==
Medal	Name	Sport	Event	Date
1st place, gold medalist(s)	Minerva Amsterdam; François Brandt; Roelof Klein; Hermanus Brockmann; Unknown French boy	Rowing	Men's coxed pair	August 26
2nd place, silver medalist(s)	Mascotte; Henri Smulders; Chris Hooijkaas; Arie van der Velden	Sailing	3 to 10 ton (Race 1)	May 24
2nd place, silver medalist(s)	Minerva Amsterdam; Coenraad Hiebendaal; Geert Lotsij; Paul Lotsij; Johannes Terwogt; Hermanus Brockmann	Rowing	Men's coxed four	August 27
3rd place, bronze medalist(s)	Solko van den Bergh; Antonius Bouwens; Dirk Boest Gips; Henrik Sillem; Anthony Sweijs	Shooting	Men's 50 metre free pistol Team	August 1
3rd place, bronze medalist(s)	Johannes Drost	Swimming	Men's 200 metre backstroke	August 12
3rd place, bronze medalist(s)	Minerva Amsterdam: François Brandt; Johannes van Dijk; Roelof Klein; Ruurd Leegstra; Walter Middelberg; Hendrik Offerhaus; Walter Thijssen; Henricus Tromp; Hermanus Brockmann	Rowing	Men's eight	August 26

== Results by event ==
=== Aquatics ===
==== Swimming ====
The Netherlands had 4 swimmers compete in 1900. Drost won a bronze medal; two others made their event finals but did not medal.

Swimmer	Event	Semifinals		Final	
Swimmer	Event	Result	Rank	Result	Rank
Herman de By	Men's 200 metre freestyle	3:10.4	2	did not advance	
Eduard Meijer	Men's 4000 metre freestyle	1:17:55.4	2 q	1:16:37.2	5
Johannes Bloemen	Men's 200 metre backstroke	3:09.2	1 Q	3:02.2	4
Johannes Drost	Men's 200 metre backstroke	3:10.2	2 q	3:01.0	3rd place, bronze medalist(s)

=== Archery ===
6 Dutch archers competed in the first Olympic archery competition. The Netherlands did not win any medals in the competition. None of the names of the Dutch archers are known. They competed only in the Sur la Perche à la Herse and Sur la Perche à la Pyramide events, though whether all six competed in both or if any or all competed in only one is also unknown.

=== Fencing ===
The Netherlands first competed in fencing at the Olympics in the sport's second appearance. The nation sent one fencer.

Fencer	Event	Round 1		Quarterfinals		Repechage		Semifinals		Final	
Fencer	Event	Result	Rank	Result	Rank	Result	Rank	Result	Rank	Result	Rank
Antonius van Nieuwenhuizen	Men's masters épée	Unknown	3–6	—N/a				did not advance			

=== Rowing ===
The Netherlands had 3 boats, all from the Minerva Amsterdam club, compete in the first Olympic rowing competitions. They won 1 medal of each color. Because the unknown cox in the coxed pair final was a French boy, the gold medal was often credited as a mixed team medal rather than a Dutch one.

Boat	Event	Round 1		Semifinals		Final	
Boat	Event	Result	Rank	Result	Rank	Result	Rank
Minerva Amsterdam: François Brandt; Roelof Klein; Hermanus Brockmann (cox in heat)^{[1]}; unknown cox in final	Men's coxed pair	—N/a		6:56.0	2 Q	7:34.2	1st place, gold medalist(s)
Minerva Amsterdam: Coenraad Hiebendaal; Gerhard Lotsy; Paulus Lotsy; Johannes Terwogt; Hermanus Brockmann (cox)	Men's coxed four	—N/a		6:02.0	1 QB	6:03.0	2nd place, silver medalist(s)
Minerva Amsterdam: François Brandt; Johannes van Dijk; Roelof Klein; Ruurd Leegstra; Walter Middelberg; Hendrik Offerhaus; Walter Thijssen; Henricus Tromp; Hermanus Brockmann (cox)	Men's eight	—N/a		4:59.2	1 Q	6:23.0	3rd place, bronze medalist(s)

=== Sailing ===
The Dutch had one boat in the first Olympic sailing competition. The Dutch team competed in both races of the 3–10 ton class, winning silver and taking 4th. They also competed in the open class, but did not finish.

Sailors	Event	Time	Rank
Christoffel Hooijkaas; Henricus Smulders; Arie van der Valden	3–10 ton class race 1	3:46:52	2nd place, silver medalist(s)
Christoffel Hooijkaas; Henricus Smulders; Arie van der Valden	3–10 ton class race 2	4:46:36	4
Christoffel Hooijkaas; Henricus Smulders; Arie van der Valden	Open class	DNF	–

=== Shooting ===
The Netherlands' first Olympic appearance included competing in the shooting events. Dutch shooters competed in the military pistol and military rifle sets of events.

Shooter	Event	Score	Rank
Antonius Bouwens	Men's 50 metre free pistol	390	15
Dirk Boest Gips	Men's 50 metre free pistol	437	6
Henrik Sillem	Men's 50 metre free pistol	408	12
Anthony Sweijs	Men's 50 metre free pistol	310	20
Solko van den Bergh	Men's 50 metre free pistol	331	18
Antonius Bouwens; Gerardus van Haan; Henrik Sillem; Anthony Sweijs; Solko van den Bergh	Men's 50 metre free pistol, team	1876	3rd place, bronze medalist(s)
Antonius Bouwens	Men's 300 metre free rifle, standing	238	28
Marcus Ravenswaaij	Men's 300 metre free rifle, standing	272	14
Henrik Sillem	Men's 300 metre free rifle, standing	249	25
Solko van den Bergh	Men's 300 metre free rifle, standing	239	26
Uilke Vuurman	Men's 300 metre free rifle, standing	261	22
Antonius Bouwens	Men's 300 metre free rifle, kneeling	296	11
Marcus Ravenswaaij	Men's 300 metre free rifle, kneeling	306	5
Henrik Sillem	Men's 300 metre free rifle, kneeling	281	19
Solko van den Bergh	Men's 300 metre free rifle, kneeling	274	20
Uilke Vuurman	Men's 300 metre free rifle, kneeling	303	6
Antonius Bouwens	Men's 300 metre free rifle, prone	278	26
Marcus Ravenswaaij	Men's 300 metre free rifle, prone	303	14
Henrik Sillem	Men's 300 metre free rifle, prone	317	6
Solko van den Bergh	Men's 300 metre free rifle, prone	292	20
Uilke Vuurman	Men's 300 metre free rifle, prone	312	8
Antonius Bouwens	Men's 300 metre free rifle, three positions	812	25
Marcus Ravenswaaij	Men's 300 metre free rifle, three positions	881	9
Henrik Sillem	Men's 300 metre free rifle, three positions	847	18
Solko van den Bergh	Men's 300 metre free rifle, three positions	805	27
Uilke Vuurman	Men's 300 metre free rifle, three positions	876	14
Antonius Bouwens; Marcus Ravenswaaij; Henrik Sillem; Solko van den Bergh; Uilke Vuurman	Men's 300 metre free rifle, team	4221	5
