= Norway at the 1900 Summer Olympics =

- IOC code: NOR
- NOC: Norwegian Olympic Committee and Confederation of Sports
- Website: www.idrett.no (in Norwegian)

in Paris
- Competitors: 7 in 2 sports
- Medals Ranked 17th: Gold 0 Silver 2 Bronze 3 Total 5

Summer Olympics appearances (overview)
- 1900; 1904; 1908; 1912; 1920; 1924; 1928; 1932; 1936; 1948; 1952; 1956; 1960; 1964; 1968; 1972; 1976; 1980; 1984; 1988; 1992; 1996; 2000; 2004; 2008; 2012; 2016; 2020; 2024

Other related appearances
- 1906 Intercalated Games

Norway competed at the Summer Olympic Games for the first time at the 1900 Summer Olympics in Paris. Results from Norwegian athletes are typically considered separate from those of Swedish competitors despite the Union between Sweden and Norway that existed in 1900, as these were two separate kingdoms in a personal union under one king.

== Medalists ==
Norway finished in 16th position in the final medal rankings with 5 medals.

Medal	Name	Sport	Event	Date
(silver)	Ole Østmo	Shooting	300 metre free rifle, standing	August 5
(silver)	Olaf Frydenlund; Hellmer Hermandsen; Ole Østmo; Ole Sæther; Tom Seeberg	Shooting	300 metre free rifle, team	August 5
(bronze)	Carl Albert Andersen	Athletics	pole vault	July 15
(bronze)	Ole Østmo	Shooting	300 metre free rifle, prone	August 5
(bronze)	Ole Østmo	Shooting	300 metre free rifle, three positions	August 5

== Results by event ==
=== Athletics ===
Two Norwegian athletes, a runner and a jumper, competed in four athletics events, winning one bronze medal in the pole vault.

Athlete	Event	Heat		Final	
Athlete	Event	Result	Rank	Result	Rank
Yngvar Bryn	200 m	Unknown	3	did not advance	
Yngvar Bryn	400 m	Unknown	5	did not advance	

Athlete	Event	Final	
Athlete	Event	Result	Rank
Carl Albert Andersen	High jump	1.70	4
Carl Albert Andersen	Pole vault	3.20	(bronze)

=== Shooting ===
Norway won four medals in the five military rifle events, including the silver medal in the team section. Østmo took bronze in the individual overall, as well as a silver and a bronze in two of the positions.

Shooter	Event	Score	Rank
Ole Østmo	Men's 300 metre free rifle, standing	299	2nd place, silver medalist(s)
Helmer Hermandsen	Men's 300 metre free rifle, standing	280	9
Tom Seeberg	Men's 300 metre free rifle, standing	275	13
Olaf Frydenlund	Men's 300 metre free rifle, standing	271	16
Ole Sæther	Men's 300 metre free rifle, standing	239	26
Ole Sæther	Men's 300 metre free rifle, kneeling	293	12
Helmer Hermandsen	Men's 300 metre free rifle, kneeling	290	13
Ole Østmo	Men's 300 metre free rifle, kneeling	289	15
Tom Seeberg	Men's 300 metre free rifle, kneeling	272	21
Olaf Frydenlund	Men's 300 metre free rifle, kneeling	259	27
Ole Østmo	Men's 300 metre free rifle, prone	329	3rd place, bronze medalist(s)
Helmer Hermandsen	Men's 300 metre free rifle, prone	308	10
Tom Seeberg	Men's 300 metre free rifle, prone	301	16
Ole Sæther	Men's 300 metre free rifle, prone	298	18
Olaf Frydenlund	Men's 300 metre free rifle, prone	287	22
Ole Østmo	Men's 300 metre free rifle, three positions	917	3rd place, bronze medalist(s)
Helmer Hermandsen	Men's 300 metre free rifle, three positions	878	13
Tom Seeberg	Men's 300 metre free rifle, three positions	848	17
Ole Sæther	Men's 300 metre free rifle, three positions	830	20
Olaf Frydenlund	Men's 300 metre free rifle, three positions	817	24
Ole Østmo; Helmer Hermandsen; Tom Seeberg; Olaf Frydenlund; Ole Sæther	Men's 300 metre free rifle, team	4290	2nd place, silver medalist(s)
