= Shooting at the 1900 Summer Olympics – Men's 50 metre team pistol =

Sports shooting at the Olympics

Men's 50 metre team pistol at the Games of the II Olympiad
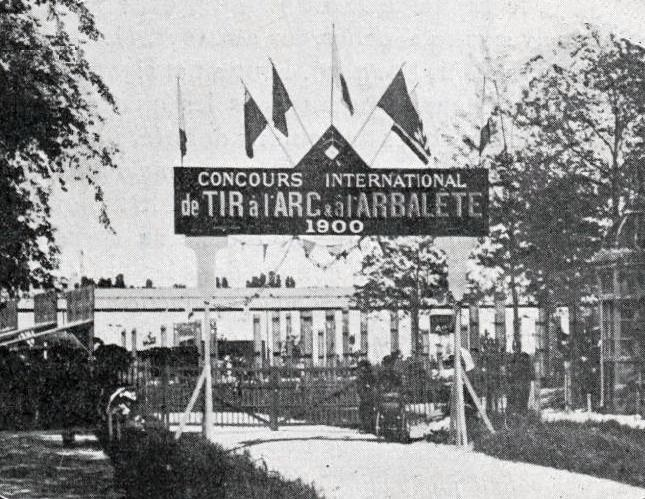
- Entrance to the target stand
- Venue: Satory
- Date: August 1, 1900
- Competitors: 20 from 4 nations
- Winning score: 2271

Medalists
| 1st place, gold medalist(s) | | Switzerland: Friedrich Lüthi; Paul Probst; Louis Richardet; Karl Röderer; Konrad Stäheli |
| 2nd place, silver medalist(s) | | France: Louis Dutfoy; Maurice Lecoq; Léon Moreaux; Achille Paroche; Jules Trinité |
| 3rd place, bronze medalist(s) | | Netherlands: Solko van den Bergh; Antonius Bouwens; Dirk Boest Gips; Henrik Sillem; Anthony Sweijs |

The 50 metre team free pistol event was one of the competitions in the Shooting at the 1900 Summer Olympics events in Paris. It was held on 1 August 1900. 20 shooters from 4 nations competed, with five shooters per team. Medals were given for individual high scores, and the scores of the five shooters were summed to give a team score. The winning team was from Switzerland; silver went to France and the Netherlands took bronze.

== Background ==
This was the first appearance of a team version of what would become (for individuals) standardised as the men's ISSF 50 meter pistol event. The team event was held 4 times, at every Summer Olympics from 1900 to 1920 (except 1904, when no shooting events were held).

Röderer used a Waffenfabrik Bern 1882 Swiss Ordnance Revolver.

== Competition format ==
The competition had each shooter fire 60 shots at a distance of 50 metres. The target was round, 50 centimetres in diameter, with 10 scoring rings. Scoring for each shot was up to 10 points, in increments of 1 point. The maximum individual score possible was 600 points; the maximum team score (sum of five individual scores) was 3000 points.

Revolver must have a barrel of 11 cm in length. Ties were broken by greatest number of shots on target (1 or better), then greatest number in the black (7 or better), then by ring (10, 9, 8, etc.).

== Schedule ==
| Date | Time | Round |
|---|---|---|
| Wednesday, 1 August 1900 | 8:00 | Final |

== Results ==
The scores of the five shooters on each team were summed to give a team score. All scores were taken from the individual event; no further shooting was done. The maximum score was 3000.

| Rank | Nation | Shooter | Score |
|---|---|---|---|
| 1st place, gold medalist(s) | Switzerland | Switzerland total | 2271 |
| 1st place, gold medalist(s) | Switzerland | Karl Röderer | 503 |
| 1st place, gold medalist(s) | Switzerland | Konrad Stäheli | 453 |
| 1st place, gold medalist(s) | Switzerland | Louis Richardet | 448 |
| 1st place, gold medalist(s) | Switzerland | Friedrich Lüthi | 435 |
| 1st place, gold medalist(s) | Switzerland | Paul Probst | 432 |
| 2nd place, silver medalist(s) | France | France total | 2203 |
| 2nd place, silver medalist(s) | France | Achille Paroche | 466 |
| 2nd place, silver medalist(s) | France | Louis Duffoy | 442 |
| 2nd place, silver medalist(s) | France | Léon Moreaux | 435 |
| 2nd place, silver medalist(s) | France | Jules Trinité | 431 |
| 2nd place, silver medalist(s) | France | Maurice Lecoq | 429 |
| 3rd place, bronze medalist(s) | Netherlands | Netherlands total | 1876 |
| 3rd place, bronze medalist(s) | Netherlands | Dirk Boest Gips | 437 |
| 3rd place, bronze medalist(s) | Netherlands | Henrik Sillem | 408 |
| 3rd place, bronze medalist(s) | Netherlands | Antonius Bouwens | 390 |
| 3rd place, bronze medalist(s) | Netherlands | Solko van den Bergh | 331 |
| 3rd place, bronze medalist(s) | Netherlands | Anthony Sweijs | 310 |
| 4 | Belgium | Belgium total | 1823 |
| 4 | Belgium | Alban Rooman | 405 |
| 4 | Belgium | Émile Thèves | 404 |
| 4 | Belgium | Victor Robert | 351 |
| 4 | Belgium | Pierre Eichhorn | 345 |
| 4 | Belgium | Charles Lebègue | 318 |
