= Switzerland at the 1906 Intercalated Games =

Switzerland at the Olympics

- IOC code: SUI
- NOC: Swiss Olympic Association

in Athens
- Competitors: 9 in 3 sports
- Medals Ranked 6th: Gold 4 Silver 3 Bronze 1 Total 8

Summer appearances
- 1896; 1900; ~~1904~~; 1908; 1912; 1920; 1924; 1928; 1932; 1936; 1948; 1952; 1956; 1960; 1964; 1968; 1972; 1976; 1980; 1984; 1988; 1992; 1996; 2000; 2004; 2008; 2012; 2016; 2020; 2024; 2028

Winter appearances
- 1924; 1928; 1932; 1936; 1948; 1952; 1956; 1960; 1964; 1968; 1972; 1976; 1980; 1984; 1988; 1992; 1994; 1998; 2002; 2006; 2010; 2014; 2018; 2022; 2026

Switzerland competed at the 1906 Intercalated Games in Athens, Greece. Nine athletes, all men, competed in fourteen events in three sports.

== Medalists ==
Medal	Name	Sport	Event
Gold	Louis Richardet	Shooting	Military Revolver, 20 metres
Gold	Konrad Stäheli; Jean Reich; Louis Richardet; Marcel Meyer de Stadelhofen; Alfred Grütter	Shooting	Rifle 3 positions 300 metres Team
Gold	Marcel Meyer de Stadelhofen	Shooting	Free Rifle any position, 300 metres
Gold	Louis Richardet	Shooting	Rifle Kneeling or Standing, 300 metres
Silver	Konrad Stäheli	Shooting	Free Rifle any position, 300 metres
Silver	Louis Richardet	Shooting	Rifle Gras Model Kneeling or Standing, 200 metres
Silver	Jean Reich	Shooting	Rifle Kneeling or Standing, 300 metres
Bronze	Jean Reich	Shooting	Rifle Gras Model Kneeling or Standing, 200 metres

== Athletics ==
Athlete	Events	Final	
Athlete	Events	Result	Rank
Adolf Tobler	Marathon	did not finish	

== Cycling ==
Athlete	Events	Heat		Semifinals		Final	
Athlete	Events	Result	Rank	Result	Rank	Result	Rank
Hans Studer	Individual road race	n/a				Unknown	
Hans Studer	Sprint	n/a				Unknown	Unknown
Ernst Meyer	Sprint	n/a				Unknown	Unknown
Hans Studer	333 metres time trial	n/a				25 3/5	19
Ernst Meyer	5000 metres	Unknown	3	did not advance			
Hans Studer	5000 metres	Unknown	4	did not advance			
Ernst Meyer	20 kilometres	Unknown	Unknown	did not advance			
Hans Studer	20 kilometres	Unknown	Unknown	did not advance			

== Shooting ==
Athlete	Event	Target Hits	Points	Rank
Louis Richardet	Free pistol, 25 metres	30	241	4
Marcel Meyer de Stadelhofen	Free pistol, 25 metres	30	214	19
Jean Reich	Free pistol, 25 metres	28	188	25
Konrad Stäheli	Free pistol, 50 metres	30	206	4
Louis Richardet	Free pistol, 50 metres	29	194	13
Marcel Meyer de Stadelhofen	Free pistol, 50 metres	28	191	15
Caspar Widmer	Free pistol, 50 metres	30	185	17
Jean Reich	Free pistol, 50 metres	27	163	25
Louis Richardet	Gras Model Revolver, 20 metres	29	199	7
Konrad Stäheli	Gras Model Revolver, 20 metres	29	192	12
Caspar Widmer	Gras Model Revolver, 20 metres	27	136	23
Jean Reich	Gras Model Revolver, 20 metres	20	103	17
Marcel Meyer de Stadelhofen	Gras Model Revolver, 20 metres	did not finish		
Louis Richardet	Military Revolver, 20 metres	30	253	1st place, gold medalist(s)
Konrad Stäheli	Military Revolver, 20 metres	29	240	4
Jean Reich	Military Revolver, 20 metres	30	217	18
Marcel Meyer de Stadelhofen	Military Revolver, 20 metres	30	174	30
Konrad Stäheli; Jean Reich; Louis Richardet; Marcel Meyer de Stadelhofen; Alfred Grütter	Rifle 3 positions 300 metres Team	599	4617	1st place, gold medalist(s)
Marcel Meyer de Stadelhofen	Free Rifle any position, 300 metres	30	243	1st place, gold medalist(s)
Konrad Stäheli	Free Rifle any position, 300 metres	30	238	2nd place, silver medalist(s)
Louis Richardet	Free Rifle any position, 300 metres	30	221	10
Caspar Widmer	Free Rifle any position, 300 metres	30	210	15
Jean Reich	Free Rifle any position, 300 metres	29	197	22
Alfred Grütter	Free Rifle any position, 300 metres	28	194	23
Louis Richardet	Rifle Gras Model Kneeling or Standing, 200 metres	29	187	2nd place, silver medalist(s)
Jean Reich	Rifle Gras Model Kneeling or Standing, 200 metres	28	183	3rd place, bronze medalist(s)
Marcel Meyer de Stadelhofen	Rifle Gras Model Kneeling or Standing, 200 metres	20	84	28
Louis Richardet	Rifle Kneeling or Standing, 300 metres	30	238	1st place, gold medalist(s)
Jean Reich	Rifle Kneeling or Standing, 300 metres	29	234	2nd place, silver medalist(s)
Marcel Meyer de Stadelhofen	Rifle Kneeling or Standing, 300 metres	30	222	7
Caspar Widmer	Rifle Kneeling or Standing, 300 metres	29	200	14
Konrad Stäheli	Rifle Kneeling or Standing, 300 metres	29	174	24
