= Denmark at the 1900 Summer Olympics =

- IOC code: DEN
- NOC: Danish Sports Confederation

in Paris, France May 14, 1900 – October 28, 1900
- Competitors: 13 in 5 sports and 14 events
- Medals Ranked 10th: Gold 1 Silver 3 Bronze 2 Total 6

Summer Olympics appearances (overview)
- 1896; 1900; 1904; 1908; 1912; 1920; 1924; 1928; 1932; 1936; 1948; 1952; 1956; 1960; 1964; 1968; 1972; 1976; 1980; 1984; 1988; 1992; 1996; 2000; 2004; 2008; 2012; 2016; 2020; 2024

Other related appearances
- 1906 Intercalated Games

Denmark competed at the 1900 Summer Olympics in Paris. The Danish contingent, 11 men, competed in 4 sports and had 30 entries in 14 events. 3 Danish athletes also competed in Tug-of-War under the mixed team flag.

== Medalists ==
Medals awarded to participants of mixed-NOC teams are represented in italics. These medals are not counted towards the individual NOC medal tally. In the discipline sections below, the medalists' names are bolded.

Medal	Name	Sport	Event	Date
Gold	Lars Jørgen Madsen	Shooting	Men's 300 metre free rifle, standing	August 5
Gold	Edgar Aabye; Eugen Schmidt; Charles Winckler	Tug of war	Men's	July 16
Silver	Anders Peter Nielsen	Shooting	Men's 300 metre free rifle, kneeling	August 5
Silver	Anders Peter Nielsen	Shooting	Men's 300 metre free rifle, prone	August 5
Silver	Anders Peter Nielsen	Shooting	Men's 300 metre free rifle, three positions	August 5
Bronze	Ernst Schultz	Athletics	400 m	July 15
Bronze	Peder Lykkeberg	Swimming	Underwater swimming	August 12

Medals by sport
Sport	1st place, gold medalist(s)	2nd place, silver medalist(s)	3rd place, bronze medalist(s)	Total
Athletics	0	0	1	**1**
Shooting	1	3	0	**4**
Swimming	0	0	1	**1**
Total	1	3	2	6

=== Multiple medalists ===
The following competitors won multiple medals at the 1900 Olympic Games.

Name	Medal	Sport	Event
Anders Peter Nielsen	Silver; Silver; Silver	Shooting	Men's 300 metre free rifle, kneeling Men's 300 metre free rifle, prone Men's 300 metre free rifle, three positions

== Competitors ==
The following is the list of number of competitors in the Games.

Sport	Men	Women	Total
Athletics	4	0	4
Fencing	1	0	1
Shooting	5	0	5
Swimming	1	0	1
Tug of war	3	0	3
Total	13	0	13

== Athletics ==
Denmark competed in athletics for the second time. Four athletes competed in six athletics events, taking a bronze medal. It was Denmark's first athletics medal.

Track & road events

Athlete	Event	Heat		Semifinal		Repechage		Final	
Athlete	Event	Time	Rank	Time	Rank	Time	Rank	Time	Rank
Johannes Gandil	100 m	Unknown	3	Did not advance					
Ernst Schultz	100 m	DNS		Did not advance					
Johannes Gandil	400 m	DNS		—N/a				Did not advance	
Ernst Schultz	400 m	Unknown	2 Q	—N/a				51.5	3rd place, bronze medalist(s)
Christian Christensen	800 m	Unknown	5	—N/a				Did not advance	
Christian Christensen	1500 m	—N/a						Unknown	5

Field events

Athlete	Event	Qualification		Final	
Athlete	Event	Distance	Position	Distance	Position
Charles Winckler	Men's shot put	10.76	10	Did not advance	
Charles Winckler	Men's discus throw	32.50	=8	Did not advance	

== Fencing ==
Denmark competed in fencing for the second time in 1900. The team won no medals that time.

Athlete	Event	Round 1			Quarterfinal			Repechage			Semifinal			Final		
Athlete	Event	MW	ML	Rank	MW	ML	Rank	MW	ML	Rank	MW	ML	Rank	MW	ML	Rank
Jens Peter Berthelsen	Men's masters foil				Did not advance											

== Shooting ==
Denmark competed again at the second Olympic shooting events. Jensen, who had been more successful in weightlifting four years earlier but had won a bronze medal in shooting, returned. This time, he received no shooting medals. Madsen won an individual gold medal, while Nielsen took three individual silvers including the overall. The team did not take a medal in the team event, though they came close with a score only 13 points less than bronze medallist France's.

Athlete	Event	Final	
Athlete	Event	Score	Rank
Viggo Jensen	Men's 300 metre free rifle, standing	277	=11
Laurids Jensen-Kjær	Men's 300 metre free rifle, standing	238	=28
Axel Kristensen	Men's 300 metre free rifle, standing	261	=22
Lars Jørgen Madsen	Men's 300 metre free rifle, standing	305	1st place, gold medalist(s)
Anders Peter Nielsen	Men's 300 metre free rifle, standing	277	=11
Viggo Jensen	Men's 300 metre free rifle, kneeling	290	=13
Laurids Jensen-Kjær	Men's 300 metre free rifle, kneeling	271	=22
Axel Kristensen	Men's 300 metre free rifle, kneeling	260	26
Lars Jørgen Madsen	Men's 300 metre free rifle, kneeling	299	8
Anders Peter Nielsen	Men's 300 metre free rifle, kneeling	314	2nd place, silver medalist(s)
Viggo Jensen	Men's 300 metre free rifle, prone	308	=10
Laurids Jensen-Kjær	Men's 300 metre free rifle, prone	273	27
Axel Kristensen	Men's 300 metre free rifle, prone	261	30
Lars Jørgen Madsen	Men's 300 metre free rifle, prone	301	=16
Anders Peter Nielsen	Men's 300 metre free rifle, prone	330	2nd place, silver medalist(s)
Viggo Jensen	Men's 300 metre free rifle, three positions	875	15
Laurids Jensen-Kjær	Men's 300 metre free rifle, three positions	782	=28
Axel Kristensen	Men's 300 metre free rifle, three positions	782	=28
Lars Jørgen Madsen	Men's 300 metre free rifle, three positions	905	5
Anders Peter Nielsen	Men's 300 metre free rifle, three positions	921	2nd place, silver medalist(s)
Lars Jørgen Madsen; Viggo Jensen; Anders Peter Nielsen; Axel Kristensen; Laurids Jensen-Kjær	Men's 300 metre free rifle, team	4265	4

== Swimming ==
Denmark entered one event in its inaugural Olympic swimming appearance, with Lykkeberg taking the bronze medal.

Athlete	Event	Final	
Athlete	Event	Score	Rank
Peder Lykkeberg	Underwater	147.0	3rd place, bronze medalist(s)

== Tug of war ==
Team	Event	Quarterfinals	Final
Team	Event	Opposition Score	Rank
A mixed team (ZZX); Edgar Aabye (DEN); August Nilsson (SWE); Eugen Schmidt (DEN); Gustaf Söderström (SWE); Karl Staaf (SWE); Charles Winckler (DEN)	Men's	Racing Club de France (ZZX); W 2-0	1st place, gold medalist(s)
