= Marcel Meyer de Stadelhofen =

Swiss jurist, politician and sport shooter

- Portrait of Meyer de Stadelhofen

Personal information
- Born: 15 March 1878 Dijon, France
- Died: 3 April 1973 (aged 95) Geneva, Switzerland
- Education: University of Geneva
- Occupation(s): Shooter, judge
- Years active: 1906 – 1914 (shooting); 1918 – 1930s (judge)

Sport
- Country: Switzerland
- Sport: Shooting
Medal record
Shooting
1906 Intercalated Games
Representing SUI
Gold medal – first place	Shooting	Free rifle, free position
Gold medal – first place	Shooting	Free rifle, team
Bronze medal – third place	Shooting	Free rifle, kneeling

Marcel Meyer de Stadelhofen (15 March 1878 – 3 April 1973) was a Swiss judge and shooter. He won two gold medals and a bronze medal at the 1906 Intercalated Games in Athens.

== Personal life ==
Marcel Meyer de Stadelhofen was born in Dijon, France. He earned a PhD at the University of Geneva. In 1914, Meyer de Stadelhofen married Anne Louise Marie Jeanne Torrenté, an engineer's daughter.

De Stadelhofen died on 3 April 1973 in Geneva, Switzerland.

== Career ==
At the 1906 Intercalated Games in Athens, de Stadelhofen won the Free rifle, free position, 300m event, and the Free rifle 300m team event, alongside Alfred Grütter, Jean Reich, Louis Richardet, and Konrad Stäheli. He also came third in the Free rifle, kneeling event. De Stadelhofen came seventh in the Men's Military Rifle, Kneeling Or Standing, 300 metres event, and also competed in five other shooting events at the Games, finishing 15th or lower in all of them.

De Stadelhofen won seven world championship team events (from 1906 to 1910 inclusive, 1912 and 1914). He also won bronze medals in 1907 and 1912 in the 300m Rifle 3 Positions Men event, a bronze medal in the 1909 300m Free Rifle 40 shots standing event, and a silver medal in the 300m Free Rifle 40 shots kneeling event. From 1906 to 1909, he was a director of the Swiss Cycling union. In 1912, de Stadelhofen was a founding member of the Swiss Olympic Committee. He served as the organisation's president between 1915 and 1921. Between 1918 and 1935, de Stadelhofen sat on the Geneva Grand Council, as an independent until 1930, and then as an independent Christian socialist. From 1935, de Stadelhofen was a judge for the council.

== Works ==
- De Stadelhofen, Marcel Meyer, De L'Assurance Collective Contre Les Accidents Du Travail: Specialement En Suisse Et En France (On Collective Insurance Against Accidents at Work: Especially In Switzerland And France), 1908, ISBN 9781160400725
