= Cavadini =

Cavadini is an Italian surname. Notable people with the surname include:

- Auguste Cavadini (1865–1922), French sport shooter
- Cathy Cavadini, American voice actress
