= Van Asbroeck =

Van Asbroeck is a surname. Notable people with the surname include:

- Paul Van Asbroeck (1874-1959), Belgian sport shooter
- Tom Van Asbroeck (born 1990), Belgian cyclist
