= Alban Rooman =

Belgian sports shooter

Personal information
- Nationality: Belgian

Sport
- Sport: Sports shooting

Alban Rooman was a Belgian sports shooter, who competed at the 1900 Summer Olympics.

At the 1900 Summer Olympics held in Paris, France, Rooman competed in the Men's 50 metre free pistol where he finished in 13th place out of twenty shooters, which contributed towards his team finishing fourth in the Men's 50 metre free pistol, team event.
