= Raoul de Boigne =

French sport shooter (1862–1949)

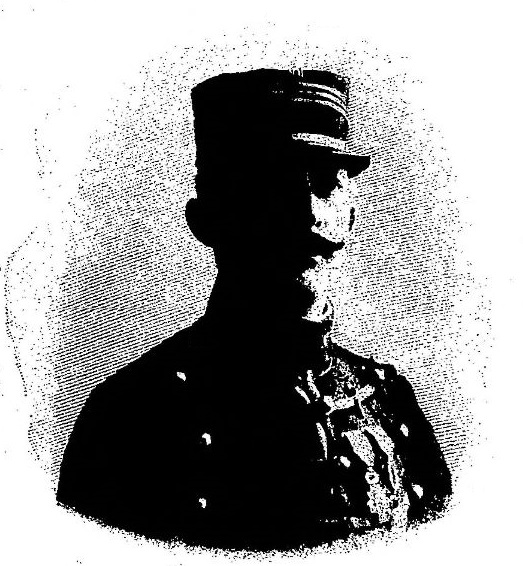
- Raoul de Boigne in 1905

Personal information
- Born: 25 December 1862 Geneva, Switzerland
- Died: 19 May 1949 (aged 86) Ouveillan, France

Sport
- Sport: Sports shooting
Medal record
Men's shooting
Representing France
Olympic Games
Bronze medal – third place	1908 London	Team free rifle
Intercalated Games
Silver medal – second place	1906 Athens	25 m army pistol
Bronze medal – third place	1906 Athens	300 m army rifle
Bronze medal – third place	1906 Athens	Team free rifle

Raoul Marie Joseph Count de Boigne (25 December 1862 – 19 May 1949) was a French sport shooter who competed at the 1906 Intercalated Games, the 1908 Summer Olympics and 1912 Summer Olympics. He was born in Geneva, Switzerland and died in Ouveillan, France.

1906 Athens

At the Intercalated Games 1906 in Athens, he won a silver medal and two bronze medals.

In the 1906 Intercalated Games, he also participated in the following events:

- free rifle, free position – seventh place
- 50 m pistol – ninth place
- trap, single shot – tenth place
- trap, double shot – tenth place
- 200 m army rifle – eleventh place
- 20 m duelling pistol – eleventh place
- 25 m army pistol (standard model) – twelfth place
- 30 m duelling pistol – 18th place
- 25 m rapid fire pistol – 23rd place

1908 London

In the 1908 Olympics, he won a bronze medal in the team free rifle event, was fourth in the team military rifle event, and was 19th in the individual 1000 yard free rifle event.

1912 Stockholm

Four years later, he was fourth in the team free rifle event, fifth in the team military rifle event, 50th in the individual 600 m free rifle event, 53rd in the individual 300 m free rifle, three positions event and 58th in the individual 300 m military rifle, three positions event.
