= Charles Lebègue =

Belgian sports shooter

Personal information
- Full name: Charles Félicien Lebègue
- Born: 3 November 1871
- Died: Unknown

Sport
- Sport: Sports shooting

Charles Félicien Lebègue (born 3 November 1871, date of death unknown) was a Belgian sports shooter, who competed at the 1900 Summer Olympics.

At the 1900 Summer Olympics held in Paris, France, Eichhorn competed in the Men's 50 metre free pistol where he finished in 19th place out of twenty shooters, which contributed towards his team finishing fourth in the Men's 50 metre free pistol, team event.
