= Émile Thèves =

Belgian sport shooter

Personal information
- Nationality: Belgian
- Born: 10 March 1869
- Died: Unknown

Sport
- Sport: Sports shooting

Émile Thèves (born 10 March 1869, date of death unknown) was a Belgian sports shooter, who competed at the 1900 Summer Olympics.

At the 1900 Summer Olympics held in Paris, France, Thèves competed in the Men's 50 metre free pistol where he finished in 14th place out of twenty shooters, which contributed towards his team finishing fourth in the Men's 50 metre free pistol, team event.
