= Ole Østmo =

Norwegian sportshooter (1866–1923)

Olympic medal record

Men's Shooting
Silver medal – second place	1900 Paris	Standing military rifle
Silver medal – second place	1900 Paris	Team military rifle
Bronze medal – third place	1900 Paris	Prone military rifle
Bronze medal – third place	1900 Paris	Three positions military rifle

Ole Østmo (13 September 1866 – 11 September 1923) was a Norwegian sharpshooting champion who competed in top rifle shooting sports events during late 19th century and early 20th century.

== Biography ==
Born in Elverum, Østmo moved to Oslo in his early twenties and became a member of the Christiania Skytterlag Club in Oslo.

Østmo won a number of medals, including one gold, at the first World Shooting Championships held in Lyon in 1897. The gold medal was in the standing shooting event, which gave him the momentum in the combination to also take a silver behind Frank Jullien of Switzerland. Additionally, the Norwegian team won a silver.

Three years later Ole Østmo returned to France to participate in the 1900 Summer Olympics in Paris where he won four Olympic medals—two silver and two bronze. The silver medals were awarded in the standing 300 metre free rifle he missed out on first place by six points to Lars Jørgen Madsen from Denmark, and in the team 300 metre free rifle event, finishing behind the team from Switzerland, the bronze medals came in the prone 300 metre free rifle, finishing behind Frenchman Achille Paroche and the Dane Anders Peter Nielsen, and he got the other third place in the three positions 300 metre free rifle, he did compete in another event the kneeling 300 metre free rifle but he could only manage fifteenth place.

Østmo died in Oslo in 1923 just two days before his 58th birthday.
