= Shooting at the 1906 Intercalated Games =

At the 1906 Summer Olympics in Athens, sixteen events in shooting were contested. Now called the Intercalated Games, the 1906 Games are no longer considered as an official Olympic Games by the International Olympic Committee.

== Medal summary ==
Event	Gold	Silver	Bronze
25 m rapid fire pistol	Maurice Lecoq; France	Léon Moreaux; France	Aristides Rangavis; Greece
50 m pistol	Georgios Orphanidis; Greece	Jean Fouconnier; France	Aristides Rangavis; Greece
20 m duelling pistol	Léon Moreaux; France	Cesare Liverziani; Italy	Maurice Lecoq; France
30 m duelling pistol	Konstantinos Skarlatos; Greece	Johan Hübner von Holst; Sweden	Vilhelm Carlberg; Sweden
Free rifle, 3 positions	Gudbrand Skatteboe; Norway	Konrad Stäheli; Switzerland	Jean Reich; Switzerland
Free rifle, prone	Gudbrand Skatteboe; Norway	Louis Richardet; Switzerland	Konrad Stäheli; Switzerland
Free rifle, kneeling	Konrad Stäheli; Switzerland	Louis Richardet; Switzerland	Marcel Meyer de Stadelhofen; Switzerland
Free rifle, standing	Gudbrand Skatteboe; Norway	Julius Braathe; Norway	Albert Helgerud; Norway
Free rifle, free position	Marcel Meyer de Stadelhofen; Switzerland	Konrad Stäheli; Switzerland	Léon Moreaux; France
Free rifle teams	Switzerland; Alfred Grütter; Jean Reich; Louis Richardet; Marcel Meyer de Stadelhofen; Konrad Stäheli	Norway; Gudbrand Skatteboe; Julius Braathe; Albert Helgerud; John Moller; Ole Holm	France; Léon Moreaux; Maurice Lecoq; Jean Fouconnier; Raoul de Boigne; Maurice Fauré
25 m army pistol (standard model)	Louis Richardet; Switzerland	Alexandros Theofilakis; Greece	Georgios Skotadis; Greece
25 m army pistol (1873 model)	Jean Fouconnier; France	Raoul de Boigne; France	Hermann Martin; France
200 m army rifle	Léon Moreaux; France	Louis Richardet; Switzerland	Jean Reich; Switzerland
300 m army rifle	Louis Richardet; Switzerland	Jean Reich; Switzerland	Raoul de Boigne; France
Trap, single shot	Gerald Merlin; Great Britain	Ioannis Peridis; Greece	Sidney Merlin; Great Britain
Trap, double shot	Sidney Merlin; Great Britain	Anastasios Metaxas; Greece	Gerald Merlin; Great Britain

== Medal table ==
Rank	Nation	Gold	Silver	Bronze	Total
1	Switzerland	5	6	4	15
2	France	4	3	5	12
3	Norway	3	2	1	6
4	Greece	2	3	3	8
5	Great Britain	2	0	2	4
6	Sweden	0	1	1	2
7	Italy	0	1	0	1
Totals (7 entries)		16	16	16	48
