= Pierre Eichhorn =

Belgian sports shooter

Personal information
- Born: 28 July 1854
- Died: Unknown

Sport
- Sport: Sports shooting

Pierre Eichhorn (born 28 July 1854, date of death unknown) was a Belgian sports shooter, who competed at the 1900 Summer Olympics.

At the 1900 Summer Olympics held in Paris, France, Eichhorn competed in the Men's 50 metre free pistol where he finished in 17th place out of twenty shooters, which contributed towards his team finishing fourth in the Men's 50 metre free pistol, team event.
