= Paul Van Asbroeck =

Belgian sport shooter (1874–1959)

Personal information
- Born: 1 May 1874 Schaerbeek, Belgium
- Died: 20 April 1959 (aged 84)

Sport
- Sport: Sport shooting
Medal record
Men's shooting
Representing Belgium
Olympic Games
Gold medal – first place	1908 London	Individual pistol
Silver medal – second place	1908 London	Team pistol
Bronze medal – third place	1900 Paris	300 metree free rifle, three positions

Paul Van Asbroeck (1 May 1874 – 20 April 1959) was a Belgian sport shooter who competed in the early 20th century in rifle and pistol shooting. He competed at the 1900 Olympics in Paris and won a bronze medal in the military rifle 3 positions category. However the medal was tied with Norwegian Ole Ostmo.

In the 1908 Olympics in London he won the Free pistol event and took silver in the team event. He also won the individual World Championships in that event in 1904, 1907, 1909, 1910, 1912, and 1914.

He also competed in the 1920, 1924, and 1936 Olympic Games, for a total of five Olympic appearances. The document 'Five Or More Appearances in the Olympics, 1992 Revision' by the Olympic historians Lennart Dahllöf, Wolf Lyberg, and Dr Bill Mallon claims that Van Asbroeck appeared in six Olympic Games, citing '1906-08, 20-28, 36', but this appears to be in error. Presumably the 1906 is a typo for 1900, since he did compete in 1906. The 1906 Intercalated Games do not count as 'official' Olympics, while shooting was not part of the Olympic programme in 1904 or 1928.

== Olympic results ==
Olympic results
Event	1900	1908	1920	1924	1936
300 metre free rifle, standing	4th 297	-	-	-	-
300 metre free rifle, kneeling	4th 308	-	-	-	-
300 metre free rifle, prone	8th 312	-	-	-	-
300 metre free rifle, three positions	(bronze) Bronze; 917	-	unknown	-	-
Team free rifle	5th 4166	5th 4509	12th 3936	11th 550	-
50 metre pistol	-	(gold) Gold; 490	7th 466	-	31st 510
50 metre free pistol, team	-	(silver) Silver; 1863	5th 2229	-	-
30 metre military pistol, team	-	-	7th 1221	-	-
50 metre small-bore rifle	-	-	unknown	9th 391	55th 285
50 metre small-bore rifle, team	-	-	6th 1785	-	-
300 metre team military rifle, prone	-	-	14th 264	-	-
300 metre team military rifle, standing	-	-	12th 217	-	-
600 metre team military rifle, prone	-	-	10th 264	-	-
300 and 600 metre team military rifle, prone	-	-	14th 469	-	-
25 metre rapid fire pistol	-	-	-	51st 8	-
600 metre free rifle	-	-	-	24th 82	-
