= Helmer Hermandsen =

Norwegian sport shooter (1871–1958)

Olympic medal record

Men's Shooting
Silver medal – second place	1900 Paris	Team military rifle

Helmer Hermandsen (1 February 1871 in Løten – 19 March 1958 in Brumunddal) was a Norwegian sport shooter who competed in the early 20th century in rifle shooting.

He participated in Shooting at the 1900 Summer Olympics in Paris and won the silver medal with the Norwegian Military Rifle team. In the same Olympics he also participated in the following events:

- military rifle, standing - ninth place
- military rifle, prone - tenth place
- individual rifle, three positions - 13th place
- military rifle, kneeling - 13th place
