= Uilke Vuurman =

Dutch sport shooter (1872–1955)

Personal information
- Born: 2 October 1872 Rotterdam, Netherlands
- Died: 14 July 1955 (aged 82) Velp, Netherlands

Sport
- Sport: Sports shooting

Uilke Vuurman (2 October 1872 – 14 July 1955) was a Dutch sport shooter who competed at the 1900 Summer Olympics and the 1908 Summer Olympics.

He was born in Rotterdam and died in Velp. He was the father of Tieleman Vuurman who competed also as sport shooter at the Olympics.

In the 1900 Summer Olympics he participated in the following events:

- Team military rifle, three positions – fifth place
- military rifle, kneeling – sixth place
- military rifle, prone – eighth place
- individual military rifle, three positions – 14th place
- military rifle, standing – 22nd place

Eight years later he finished seventh with the Dutch team in the team free rifle competition.
