= Marcus Ravenswaaij =

Dutch sport shooter (1862–1919)

Marcus Ravenswaaij (6 August 1862 – 14 March 1919) was a Dutch sport shooter who competed in the 1900 Summer Olympics. He was born in Kralingen and died in Rotterdam.

In the 1900 Summer Olympics he participated in the following events:

- Team military rifle, three positions - fifth place
- military rifle, kneeling - fifth place
- individual military rifle, three positions - ninth place
- military rifle, prone - 14th place
- military rifle, standing - 14th place
