= Jules Bury =

Belgian sport shooter

Personal information
- Full name: Jules Désiré Bury
- Born: 28 December 1862 Fontaine-l'Évêque, Belgium

Sport
- Sport: Sport shooting

Jules Désiré Bury (born 28 December 1862, date of death unknown) was a Belgian sport shooter who competed in the early 20th century in rifle shooting, he competed at the 1900 Olympics in Paris.

Bury was born into a family of gunmakers and firearm engravers from the Wallonia area in Belgium, he went on to compete at the 1900 Summer Olympics in five different rifle events, his best finishes was a sixth place in the 300 metre team rifle event although there were only six teams, and seventh place in the 300 metre standing rifle event where there were 29 other shooters.
