= Louis Dutfoy =

French sport shooter

Olympic medal record

Men's Shooting
| Silver medal – second place | 1900 Paris | Team military pistol |

Louis Charles Marie Dutfoy (12 January 1860 in Marseille – 7 August 1904 in Marseille) was a French sport shooter who competed in the late 19th century and early 20th century. He participated in Shooting at the 1900 Summer Olympics in Paris and won a silver medal with the French military pistol team.
