= Jules Trinité =

French sport shooter

Olympic medal record

Men's Shooting
Silver medal – second place	1900 Paris	50 metre team pistol

Jules Cyrus Angelle Trinité (22 December 1856 in Saint-Quentin-des-Isles – 17 December 1921 in Azay-le-Rideau) was a French sport shooter and he won a Silver medal in Shooting at the 1900 Summer Olympics in Paris.
