= Paul Probst (sport shooter) =

Swiss sport shooter

Olympic medal record

Men's Shooting
Gold medal – first place	1900 Paris	Team military pistol

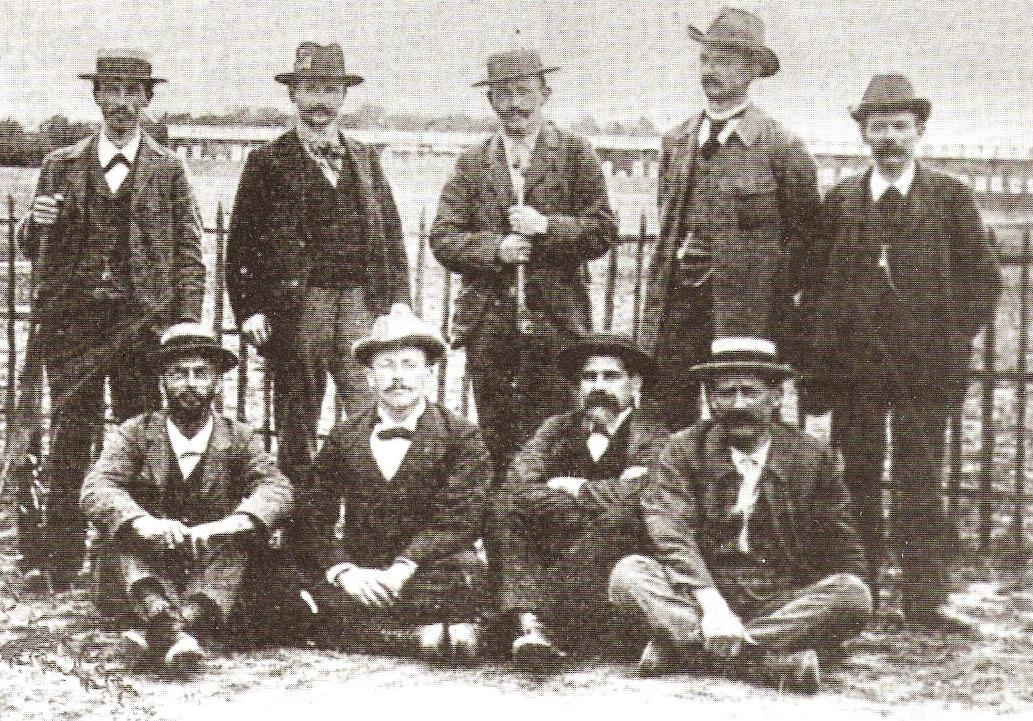
Swiss Shooting Team at the 1900 Olympic Games

Paul Probst (15 May 1869 – 9 September 1945) was a Swiss sport shooter who competed in the late 19th century and early 20th century. He participated in Shooting at the 1900 Summer Olympics in Paris and won a gold medal with the Military pistol team for Switzerland.
