= Dirk Boest Gips =

Dutch sport shooter (1864–1920)

Olympic medal record

Men's shooting

Representing the Netherlands
Bronze medal – third place	1900 Paris	Team military pistol

Dirk Boest Gips (30 July 1864 – 11 November 1920) was a Dutch sport shooter who competed in the early 20th century in pistol shooting. He participated in Shooting at the 1900 Summer Olympics in Paris and won a bronze medal with the Dutch pistol team, scoring the most points for his team.

He was born in Dordrecht and died in The Hague.

For a long time his real name wasn't known. The official protocol listed him as van Haan and almost all the sources referenced him as Gerardus van Haan or Gerardus van Loon. For about 40 years, Dutch Olympic historian Anthony Bijkerk had searched the name of the 'missing shooter' (as he himself named van Haan) until in the January 2000 he published an article in the Journal of Olympic History with evidence that the 'missing shooter' was Dirk Boest Gips.
