= Edouard Myin =

Belgian sports shooter

Personal information
- Nationality: Belgian
- Born: 28 September 1863
- Died: 7 March 1931 (aged 67)

Sport
- Sport: Sport shooting

Edouard Myin (28 September 1863 – 7 March 1931) was a Belgian sport shooter who competed in the early 20th century in rifle shooting, he competed at the 1900 Olympics in Paris.

Myin competed in five different rifle shooting events at the 1900 Summer Olympics, his best individual result was thirteenth place in the 300 metre rifle prone position event, he did win medals in the World Championship in the team three position events, he received silver medals in 1905 and 1907, plus a bronze medal in 1906.
