= Emil Kellenberger =

Swiss sport shooter (1864–1943)

Olympic medal record

Men's Shooting
Gold medal – first place	1900 Paris	Three positions military rifle
Gold medal – first place	1900 Paris	Team military rifle
Silver medal – second place	1900 Paris	Kneeling military rifle

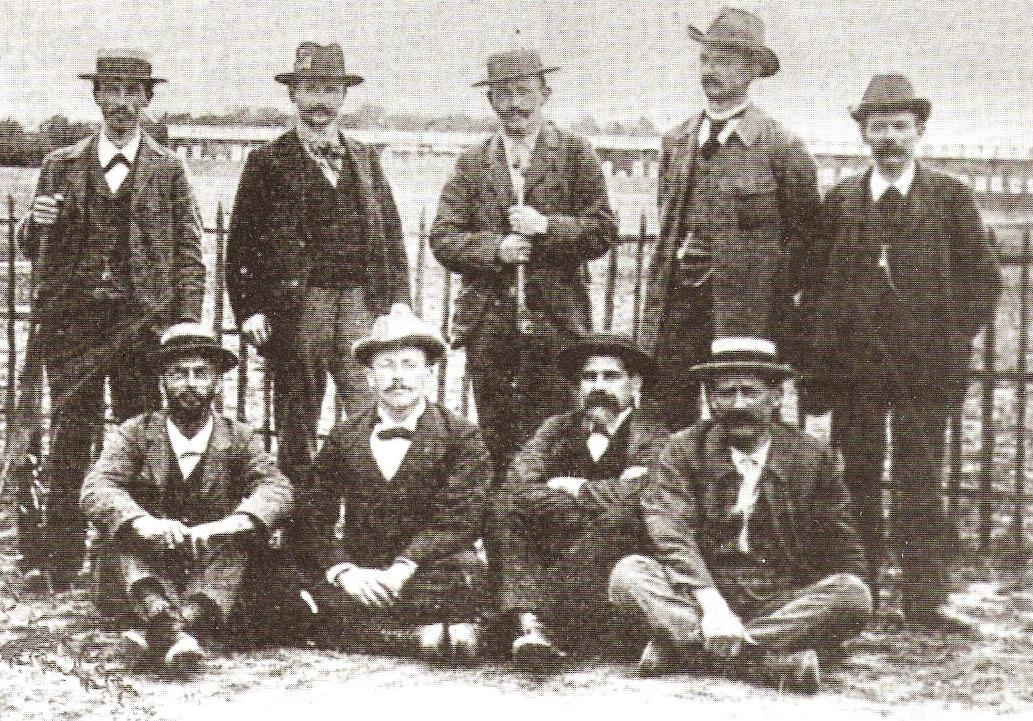
Shooting swiss 1900.jpg

Emil Kellenberger (3 April 1864 in Walzenhausen, Switzerland – 20 November 1943 in Walzenhausen) was a Swiss sport shooter who competed in the early 20th century in rifle shooting. He participated in Shooting at the 1900 Summer Olympics in Paris and won three Olympic medals, two gold medals in the Military Rifle 3 positions and team categories and a silver medal in the Military Rifle (kneeling). However his silver medal was tied with the Danish shooter Anders Peter Nielsen.
