= Karl Röderer =

Swiss sport shooter (1868–1928)

Olympic medal record

Men's Shooting
Gold medal – first place	1900 Paris	50 metre pistol
Gold medal – first place	1900 Paris	50 metre team pistol

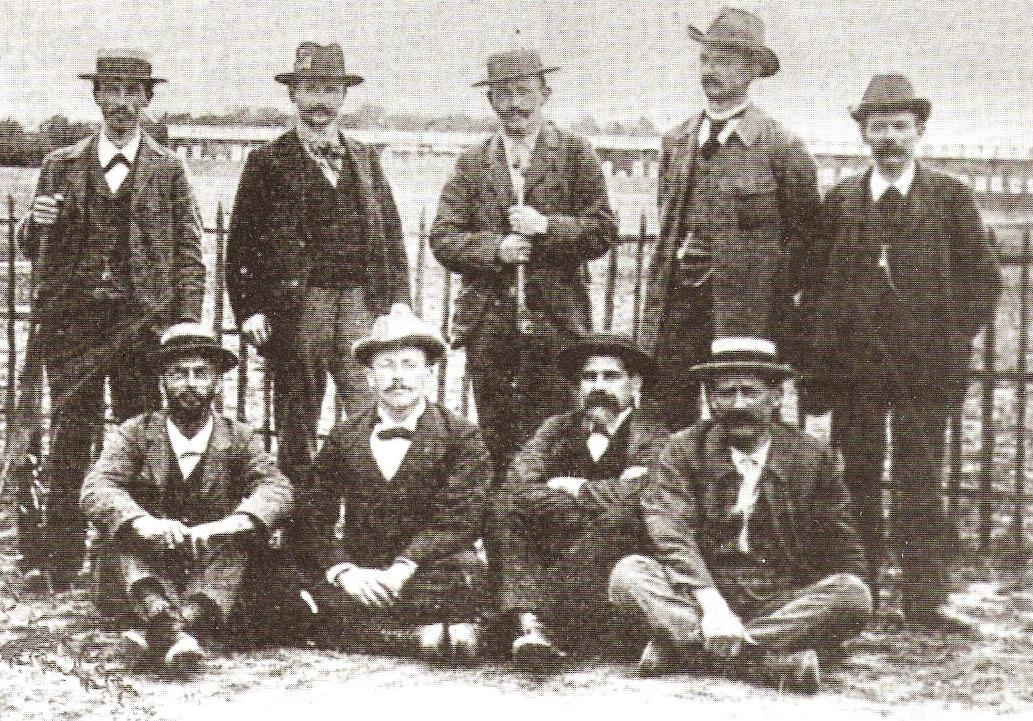
Shooting swiss 1900.jpg

Conrad Karl Röderer (12 July 1868 in Trogen – 28 August 1928 in St. Gallen) was a Swiss sport shooter who competed in the late 19th century and early 20th century in pistol shooting. He participated in Shooting at the 1900 Summer Olympics in Paris and won two gold medals in 50 metre pistol and 50 metre team pistol for Switzerland.
