= Anthony Sweijs =

Dutch sport shooter

Olympic medal record

Men's Shooting
Bronze medal – third place	1900 Paris	Team military pistol

Anthony Ahasuerus Hendrik Sweijs (18 July 1852 in Amsterdam – 30 September 1937 in Rotterdam) was a Dutch sport shooter who competed in the early 20th century in pistol shooting. He participated in Shooting at the 1900 Summer Olympics in Paris and won a bronze medal with the Dutch pistol team.
