= René Thomas (sport shooter) =

French sport shooter

Olympic medal record

Men's shooting
Bronze medal – third place	1900 Paris	300 metre team free rifle

Jean Justin René Thomas (20 August 1865 in Breux-sur-Avre – 20 July 1925) was a French sport shooter who competed in the late 19th century and early 20th century. He participated in Shooting at the 1900 Summer Olympics in Paris and won a bronze medal with the military rifle team.
