= Charles Paumier du Vergier =

Belgian sport shooter

Personal information
- Nationality: Belgian
- Born: Charles Victor Léon Joseph Paumier du Verger; 11 March 1874 Schaerbeek, Belgium
- Died: 7 October 1944 (aged 70)

Sport
- Sport: Sport shooting
Medal record
Men's shooting
Representing Belgium
Olympic Games
Bronze medal – third place	1900 Paris	Standing military rifle
Silver medal – second place	1908 London	Team 50yd free pistol

Charles Paumier du Vergier (11 March 1874 – 7 October 1944) was a Belgian sport shooter who competed in the early 20th century in rifle shooting. He participated in Shooting at the 1900 Summer Olympics in Paris and won a bronze medal in the military rifle standing event. He also competed at the 1908 Summer Olympics, winning a silver medal in the team 50 yard free pistol event.
