= Joseph Baras =

Belgian sports shooter

Personal information
- Nationality: Belgian
- Died: 5 January 1930

Sport
- Sport: Sport shooting

Joseph Baras (died 5 January 1930) was a Belgian sport shooter who competed in the early 20th century in rifle shooting, he competed at the 1900 Olympics in Paris. At the 1900 Summer Olympics, Baras competed in five different rifle shooting events; he finished last in four of them and was tied in 28th place in the other.
