= Franz Böckli =

Swiss sport shooter (1858–1937)

Olympic medal record

Men's Shooting
Gold medal – first place	1900 Paris	Team military rifle

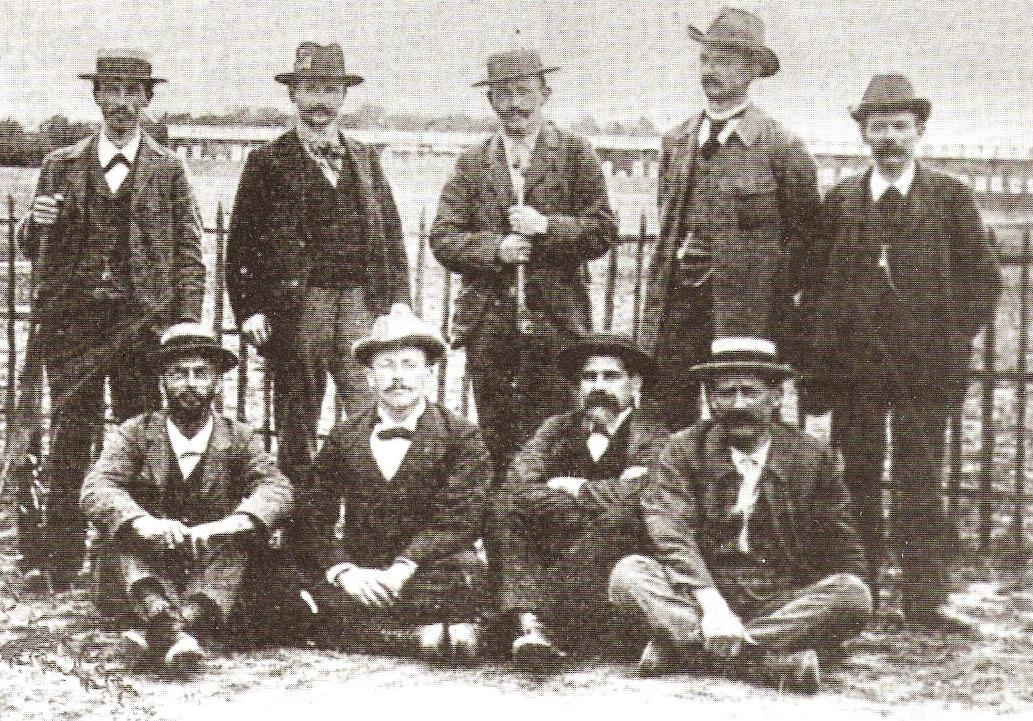
Swiss Shooting Team at the 1900 Olympic Games

Franz Böckli (March 15, 1858 – February 14, 1937) was a Swiss sport shooter who competed in the early 20th century. He participated in Shooting at the 1900 Summer Olympics in Paris and earned a gold medal with the Military rifle team for Switzerland.
