= Tom Seeberg =

Norwegian sport shooter (1860–1938)

Olympic medal record

Men's Shooting
| Silver medal – second place | 1900 Paris | 300 metre team free rifle |

Tom Seeberg (February 17, 1860 in Drammen – March 27, 1938 in Drammen) was a Norwegian sport shooter who competed in the early 20th century in rifle shooting. He participated in Shooting at the 1900 Summer Olympics in Paris and won the silver medal with the Norwegian Military Rifle team.
