= Olaf Frydenlund =

Norwegian sport shooter (1862–1947)

Olympic medal record

Men's Shooting
Silver medal – second place	1900 Paris	Team military rifle

Olaf Emil Frydenlund (16 June 1862 in Tune – 8 April 1947 in Aremark) was a Norwegian sport shooter who competed in the early 20th century in rifle shooting. He participated in Shooting at the 1900 Summer Olympics in Paris and won the silver medal with the Norwegian Military Rifle team.
