= Anders Peter Nielsen =

Danish sport shooter (1867–1950)

Personal information
- Born: 25 May 1867 Aarhus, Denmark
- Died: 16 April 1950 (aged 82) Copenhagen, Denmark

Sport
- Sport: Sport shooting
Medal record
Men's shooting
Representing Denmark
Olympic Games
Gold medal – first place	1920 Antwerp	Team 300 m military rifle, standing
Silver medal – second place	1900 Paris	Kneeling military rifle
Silver medal – second place	1900 Paris	Prone military rifle
Silver medal – second place	1900 Paris	Three positions military rifle

Anders Peter Nielsen (25 May 1867 – 16 April 1950) was a Danish sport shooter who competed in the late 19th century and early 20th century in rifle shooting. He participated in Shooting at the 1900 Summer Olympics in Paris and won three silver medals in the military rifle in the kneeling, prone, and 3 positions categories.

Twenty years later he won the gold medal as part of the Danish shooting team in the 300 m military rifle, standing team competition.
