= Auguste Cavadini =

French sport shooter (1865–1922)

Olympic medal record

Men's Shooting
Bronze medal – third place	1900 Paris	Team military rifle

Auguste Baptiste Cavadini (21 July 1865 – 18 September 1922) was a French sport shooter who competed in the late 19th century and early 20th century. He participated in Shooting at the 1900 Summer Olympics in Paris and won a bronze medal with the military rifle team.

Cavadini was born in Morbio Inferiore, Switzerland on 21 July 1865. He died in Paris on 18 September 1922 at the age of 57.
