= Léon Moreaux =

French sport shooter

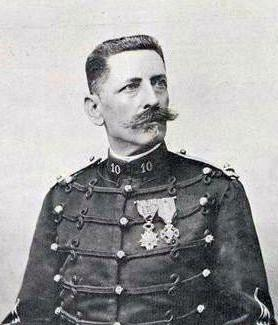
- Moreaux in 1900

Medal record

Men's shooting

Representing France

Olympic Games
| Silver medal – second place | 1900 Paris | 20 m rapid fire pistol |
| Silver medal – second place | 1900 Paris | 50 m team pistol |
| Bronze medal – third place | 1900 Paris | 300 m free rifle, team |

Intercalated Games
| Gold medal – first place | 1906 Athens | 20 m duelling pistol |
| Gold medal – first place | 1906 Athens | 200 m army rifle |
| Silver medal – second place | 1906 Athens | 25 m rapid fire pistol |
| Bronze medal – third place | 1906 Athens | Free rifle, free position |
| Bronze medal – third place | 1906 Athens | Free rifle teams |

Léon Ernest Moreaux (10 March 1852 in Féron – 11 November 1921 in Rennes) was a French sports shooter and Olympian who competed in pistol and rifle shooting in the late 19th century and early 20th century.

Having taken up the sport of shooting earlier in the 19th century, at the age of 38 he prepared himself for competition in the 1900 Olympic Games, which were held in Paris in his home country. He participated in shooting at the 1900 Summer Olympics and won the silver medal in the 25 metre firearm and in the Military Revolver Teams 50m for France and won another silver medal. He also competed in a number of other shooting competitions including the Free Rifle standing and kneeling competitions, where he finished 17th place in each, and in the Free Rifle (prone) competition where he narrowly missed the bronze medal, finishing fourth. He also competed in the Free Pistol event where he finished in 7th place, and in the trap shooting competition where he finished 16th place out of 31.

1906 was Moreaux's most successful year in sport shooting. In shooting at the 1906 Intercalated Games he entered in ten different categories, winning a total of five Olympic medals including his first gold medals. He won two gold medals in the 20m duelling pistol and in the 200 metre army rifle, a silver medal in the 25 metres firearm, and two bronze medals in the Free Rifle Free Position and the Free Rifle Team. Moreaux competed in the Military Rifle event and finished fourth, in the Military revolver event and finished fifth, and in the Duelling Pistol (au commandment), finishing in sixth place. He also competed in the Military revolver (gras) event but finished in 16th place and in the Free Pistol (50m) event, finishing in 19th position.

Moreaux entered the 1908 Olympic Games at the age of 46 and competed in the Free Team Rifle competition for France, but narrowly missed bronze, finishing in fourth position. At this point in his career, only four years away from age 50, he only competed in two other events – in the Free Pistol, finishing 17th, and in the Free Rifle Combined event, where he finished in 39th place.

After the 1908 Olympics, Moreaux retired from professional competition. He won 8 Olympic medals during his shooting career, second to only Switzerland's Konrad Stäheli (9) among his contemporaries and still among the top ten in Olympic shooting history.
