= Ole Sæther =

Norwegian sport shooter (1870–1946)

Personal information
- Full name: Ole Andreas Sæther
- Born: 23 January 1870 Steinkjer, Norway
- Died: 13 October 1946 (aged 76) Oslo, Norway

Sport
- Sport: Sports shooting
Medal record
Men's shooting
Representing Norway
Olympic Games
Gold medal – first place	1908 London	Team free rifle
Silver medal – second place	1900 Paris	300 metre team free rifle
Silver medal – second place	1912 Stockholm	Team free rifle
Bronze medal – third place	1908 London	300 m free rifle

Ole Andreas Sæther (23 January 1870 – 13 October 1946) was a Norwegian rifle shooter who competed in the early 20th century. He won several Olympic medals.
