= Achille Paroche =

French sport shooter

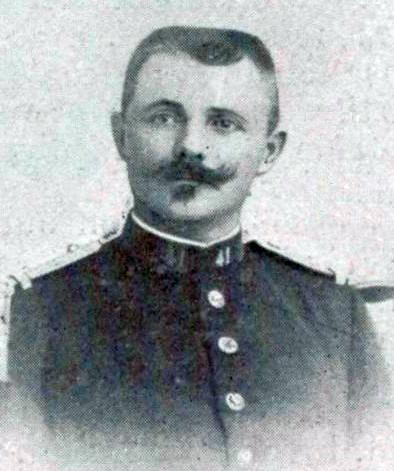
- Paroche in 1898

Personal information
- Full name: Nicolas Achille Paroche
- Born: 1 March 1868 Sery, Second French Empire
- Died: 27 May 1933 (aged 65) Signy-l'Abbaye, France
- Height: 170 cm (5 ft 7 in)

Sport
- Sport: Sport shooting
Medal record
Men's shooting
Representing France
Olympic Games
Gold medal – first place	1900 Paris	Prone military rifle
Silver medal – second place	1900 Paris	Military pistol
Silver medal – second place	1900 Paris	Team military pistol
Silver medal – second place	1920 Antwerp	Team 300 m military rifle, prone
Bronze medal – third place	1900 Paris	Team military rifle

Nicolas Achille Paroche (1 March 1868 – 27 May 1933) was a French sport shooter who competed in the 1900 Summer Olympics and 1920 Summer Olympics.

Paroche competed in 1900 at Paris and won a total of four Olympic medals. He won the gold medal in the military rifle (prone) competition, two silver medals in the military pistol individual and team events and a bronze medal with the French team in the military rifle team competition. He was also seventh in the individual military rifle, 3 positions event, 16th in the military rifle, kneeling event and 19th in the military rifle, standing event.

Twenty years later at Antwerp, Paroche won a silver medal in the Team 300 m military rifle (prone) event. He was also fourth in the team military rifle, 300 m + 600 m event, fifth in the individual 300 m military rifle, prone event, in the team 50 m small bore rifle event, in the team 300 m military rifle, standing event and in the team 600 m military rifle event and seventh in the team free rifle event. He also participated in the individual 300 m free rifle, 3 positions event, in the individual 300 m military rifle, standing event and in the individual 50 m small bore rifle event, but his placement in these competitions is unknown.
