= Maurice Lecoq =

French sport shooter (1854–1925)

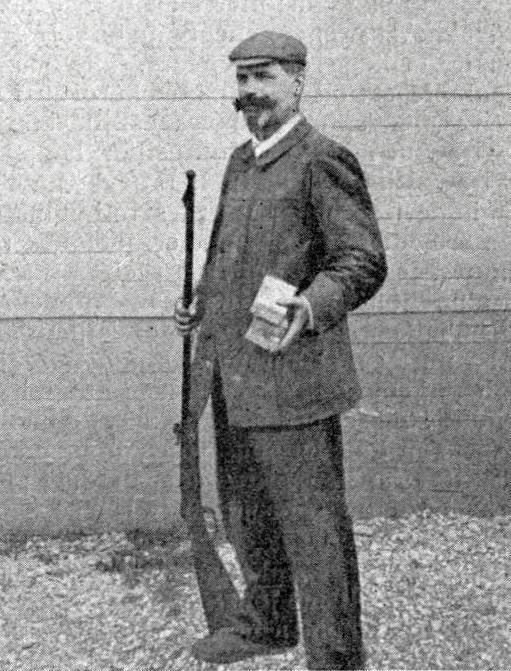
- Lecoq in 1904

Personal information
- Full name: Maurice Marie Lecoq
- Born: 26 March 1854 Angers, Second French Empire
- Died: 16 December 1925 (aged 71) Angers, France

Sport
- Sport: Sports shooting
Medal record
Men's shooting
Representing France
Olympic Games
Silver medal – second place	1900 Paris	Team military pistol
Bronze medal – third place	1900 Paris	Team military rifle
Bronze medal – third place	1908 London	Team free rifle
Intercalated Games
Gold medal – first place	1906 Athens	25 m rapid fire pistol
Bronze medal – third place	1906 Athens	20 m duelling pistol
Bronze medal – third place	1906 Athens	Team free rifle

Maurice Marie Lecoq (26 March 1854 – 16 December 1925) was a French sport shooter who competed in the late 19th century and early 20th century. He participated in Shooting at the 1900 Summer Olympics in Paris and won a silver medal with the French military pistol team and a bronze medal in the military rifle team. He also competed at the 1906 Intercalated Games and the 1908 Summer Olympics.
