= Lars Jørgen Madsen =

Danish sport shooter (1871–1925)

Personal information
- Born: 19 July 1871 Beldringe, Denmark
- Died: 1 April 1925 (aged 53) Harridslev, Randers, Denmark

Sport
- Sport: Sport shooting
Medal record
Men's shooting
Representing Denmark
Olympic Games
Gold medal – first place	1900 Paris	Standing military rifle
Gold medal – first place	1920 Antwerp	Team 300m military
Silver medal – second place	1912 Stockholm	300m free rifle
Silver medal – second place	1920 Antwerp	300m military rifle
Bronze medal – third place	1912 Stockholm	Team free rifle

Lars Jørgen Madsen (19 July 1871 – 1 April 1925) was a Danish sport shooter who competed in the early 20th century in rifle shooting. He participated in Shooting at the 1900 Summer Olympics in Paris and won a gold medal in the Military Rifle standing. Twenty years later, he won another gold, in the Military Rifle Team event. He was one of only three Danish competitors to win five Olympic medals. He also competed at the 1908, 1912 and 1924 Summer Olympics.
