= Konrad Stäheli =

Swiss sports shooter (1866–1931)

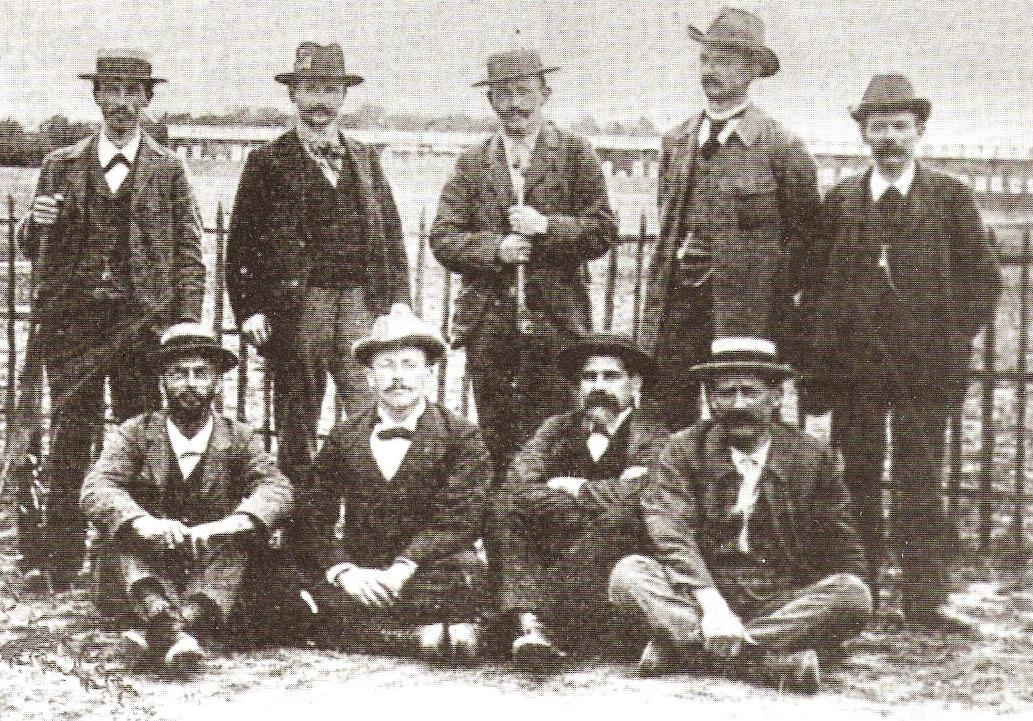
- The Swiss national shooting team dominated the medal table in Paris 1900 (in the photo there are Stäheli, Probst, Lüthi, Röderer, Richardet, Grütter, Kellenberger, Böckli and a 9th member that does not appear in the official reports of the Games)

Personal information
- Born: 17 December 1866 Egnach, Switzerland
- Died: 5 November 1931 (aged 64) St. Gallen, Switzerland
- Height: 168 cm (5 ft 6 in)

Sport
- Country: (Switzerland) Suisse
- Sport: Shooting
Medal record
Event	1st	2nd	3rd
Olympic Games	3	0	1
Intercalated Games	2	2	1
World Championships	38	17	10
Total	43	19	12
Olympic Games
Gold medal – first place	1900 Paris	50 metre team pistol
Gold medal – first place	1900 Paris	300 metre kneeling free rifle
Gold medal – first place	1900 Paris	300 metre team free rifle
Bronze medal – third place	1900 Paris	50 metre pistol
Intercalated Games
Gold medal – first place	1906 Athens	Free rifle, kneeling
Gold medal – first place	1906 Athens	Team free rifle
Silver medal – second place	1906 Athens	Free rifle, 3 positions
Silver medal – second place	1906 Athens	Free rifle, free position
Bronze medal – third place	1906 Athens	Free rifle, prone

Konrad Stäheli (17 December 1866 – 5 November 1931) was a Swiss sports shooter who competed in the late 19th century and early 20th century and participated in the 1900 Summer Olympics and the 1906 Intercalated Games.

== Biography ==
He participated in shooting at the 1900 Summer Olympics in Paris and won three gold medals – in the Military Pistol team and the Military Rifle team, and in the Military Rifle individual. He also won a bronze medal in the free pistol competition; fellow Swiss shooter Karl Roderer won gold. Participating in shooting at the 1906 Intercalated Games at Athens, Stäheli took five more medals – a gold medal, two silver medals and a bronze medal in the individual rifle events, and another gold medal in the team rifle competition. His nine total medals in Olympic shooting competition remained a record until the United States' Carl Osburn won 11, all in rifle events, between 1912 and 1924.

Stäheli also won the 1906 World Championship in 50 m Pistol. In 1909, in Hamburg, Germany, Stäheli became the first ever person to break the 1000 point barrier in the free rifle event.

== Achievements ==
Stäheli won 44 medals in the individual events (69 medals counting the events team) at the World Shooting Championships.

He won 38 gold, 17 silver and 10 bronze at the World Championships and 3 gold and 1 bronze at the Summer Olympics, but in 1900 Summer Olympics the events were valid as World Championship, therefore the total is 41/17/11.

Discipline	Years	Individual				Team				Total			
Discipline	Years	Gold medal	Silver medal	Bronze medal	Tot.	Gold medal	Silver medal	Bronze medal	Tot.	Gold medal	Silver medal	Bronze medal	Tot.
300 m Rifle 3 positions	1898–1914	6	4	2	12	0	0	0	0	6	4	2	12
300 m Free Rifle Prone 40 shots	1898–1914	4	2	1	7	0	0	0	0	4	2	1	7
300 m Free Rifle Standing 40 shots	1898–1914	1	3	1	5	14	0	1	15	15	4	2	21
300 m Free Rifle Kneeling 40 shots	1898–1914	9	3	1	13	0	0	0	0	9	3	1	13
50 m Pistol	1900–1909	1	1	3	5	3	4	1	8	4	5	4	13
		21	13	8	42	17	4	2	23	38	17	10	65

== See also ==
- World Shooting Championship Multiple Medallist
