= Satory =

Area in France

Coordinates: 48°47′11″N 2°6′43″E

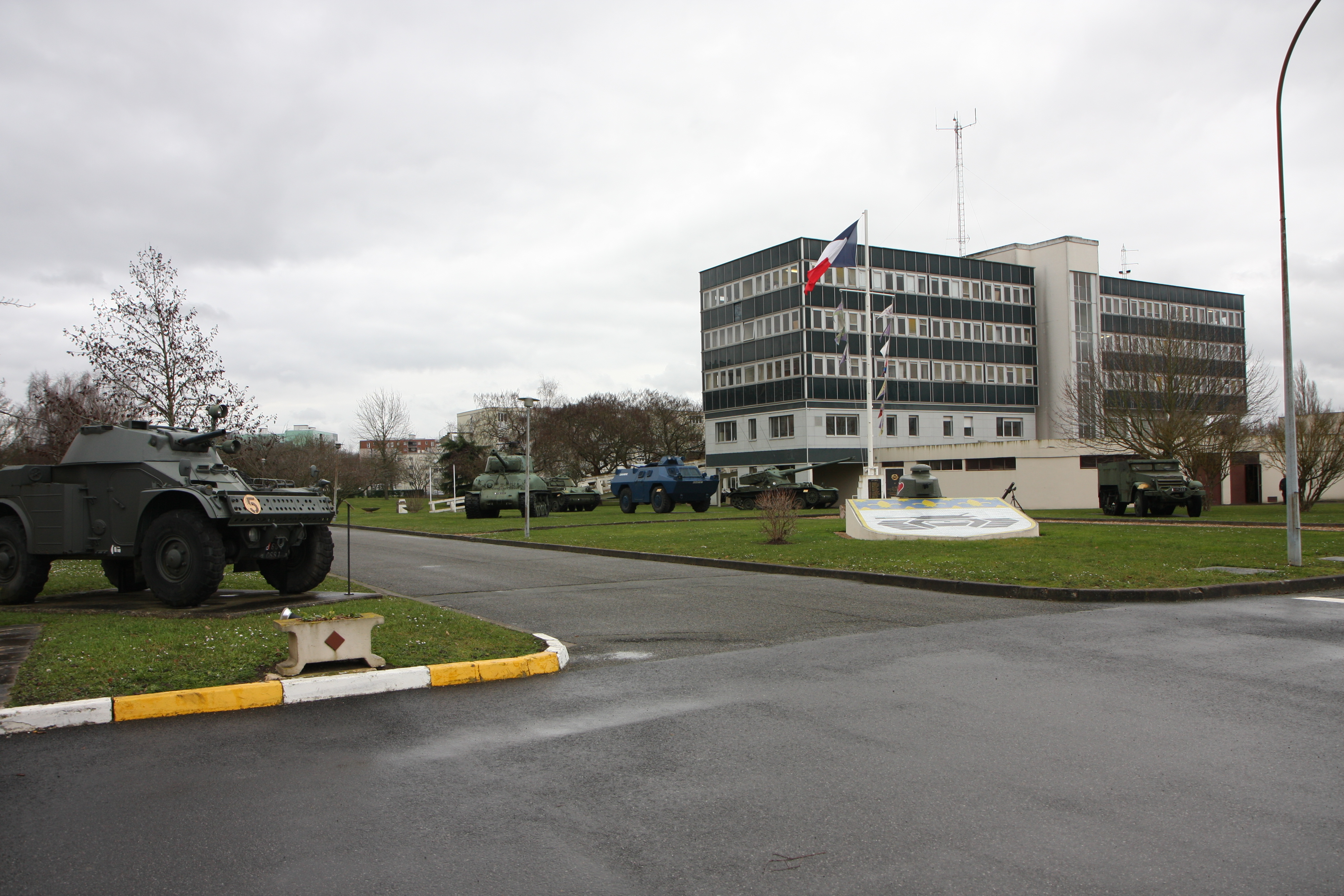
Street of Satory

Satory is an area south of Versailles in France. It is mostly known for its military camp, housing:

- Weapon-testing facilities of Nexter Systems
- Barracks and facilities for Gendarmerie including the GIGN headquarters and the Mobile Gendarmerie armored grouping (GBGM)
- Musique des Troupes de Marine
- Military barracks

The area hosted some of the shooting events for the 1900 Summer Olympics. The camp was also the original site for the Eurosatory international defense exhibition.

== Notable people ==
- Birthplace of André Michaux (1746–1802), botanist and explorer
