= Alfred Grütter =

Swiss sports shooter (1860–1937)

Medal record

Men's shooting

Representing Switzerland

Olympic Games
Gold medal – first place	1900 Paris	Military rifle (team)

Intercalated Games
Gold medal – first place	1906 Athens	Team free rifle

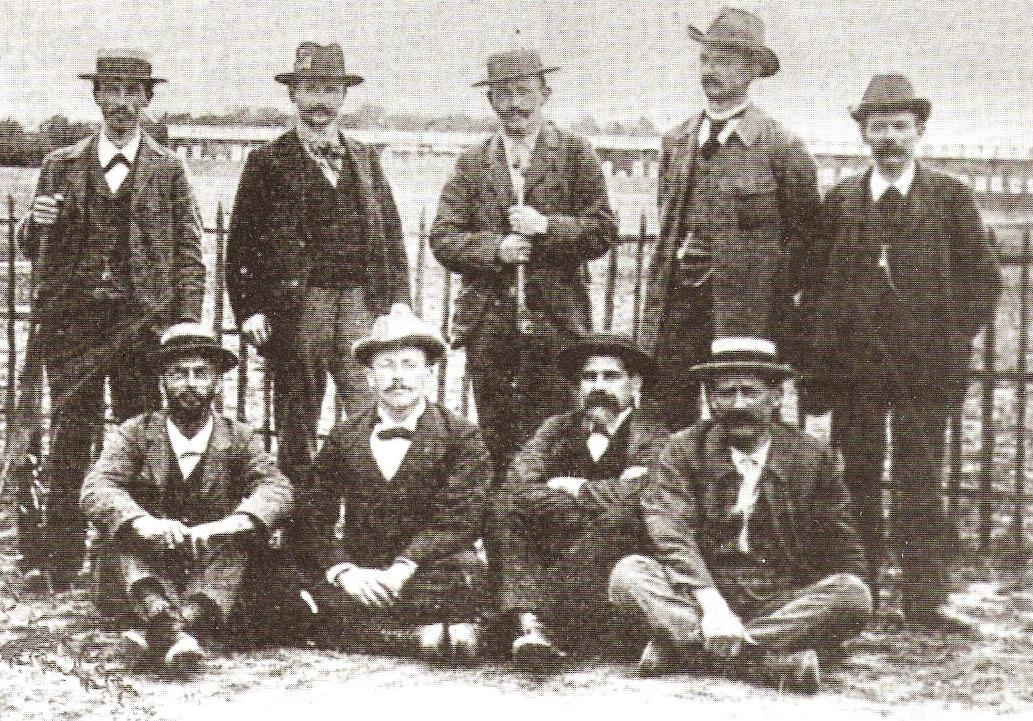
Swiss Shooting Team at the 1900 Olympic Games

Alfred Grütter (31 August 1860 – 30 January 1937) was a Swiss sports shooter who competed in the early 20th century. He participated in Shooting at the 1900 Summer Olympics in Paris and won a gold medal with the Military rifle team for Switzerland.
