= Henrik Sillem =

Dutch sport shooter

Olympic medal record

Men's Shooting
Bronze medal – third place	1900 Paris	50 metre team pistol

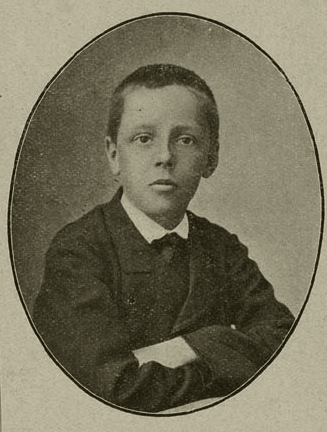
Henrik Sillem as a boy.

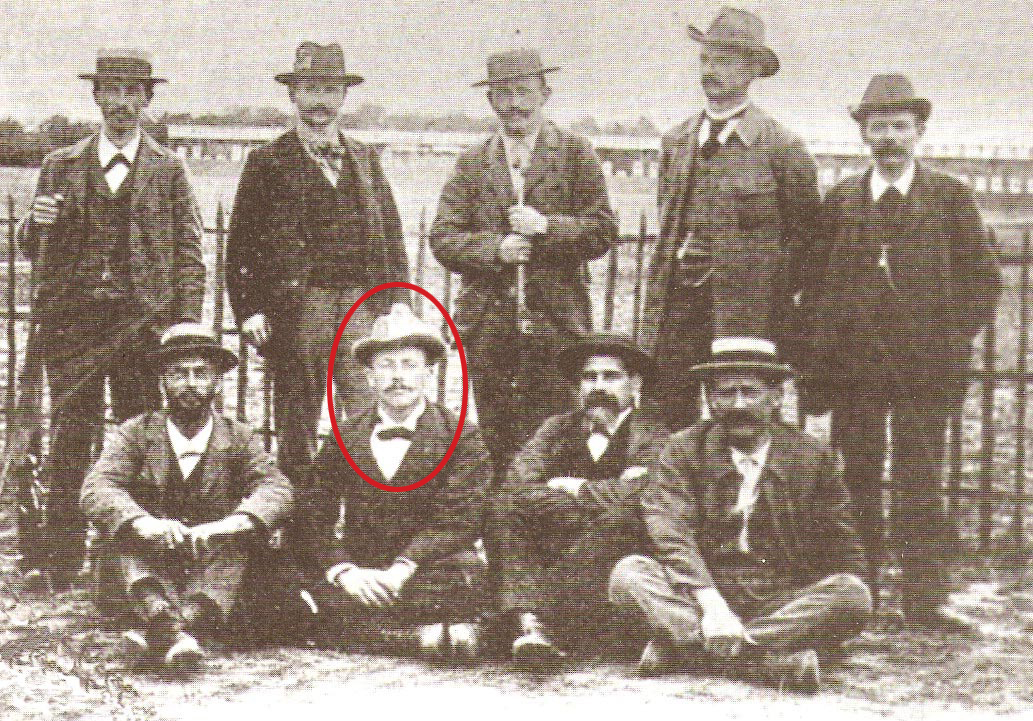
Henrik Sillem with the Dutch shooting team in Switzerland.

Hendrik "Henrik" Sillem (12 August 1866 in Amsterdam – 13 July 1907 in Courmayeur, Italy) was a Dutch jurist, mountaineer and sport shooter.

== Personal life and education ==
Henrik Sillem was the son of Johann Gottlieb Sillem, banker with Hope & Co. bankers, Amsterdam. His mother was Jkvr. Judith Catharina Henriette Hoeufft.

Henrik Sillem studied law at the University of Amsterdam. He graduated as Doctor of Law on 8 May 1891, with a thesis 'Het faillissement des verzekeraars' (Bankruptcy of insurance companies)' published by Roeloffzen en Hubner, Amsterdam in 1891.

On 28 May 1891 he married in Arnhem jkvr. Susanna Catharina Beatrix des Tombe (born 24 February 1869, Arnhem - died 6 November 1948) the daughter of jonkheer François Joan Adriaan des Tombe and Beatrix Cruys. The couple had two sons, Francois Johann and Henrick (Boet) Sillem, before divorcing in 1897.

In 1902, in London, Sillem married Bertha Johanna Eva Reuser, (1879-1971), daughter of Johann and Katharina Anna Reuser Schmolck.

Henrik Sillem worked in Amsterdam as a lawyer, legal advisor and public prosecutor.

== Olympic medalist ==
Together with his friend Solko van den Bergh and the Frenchman François Monod, Sillem initiated the first 'international shooting matches' (world championships in shooting) in 1897 in Lyon. These were the forerunners of the matches that were held in Paris in 1900, now considered to have been part of the Olympics. Sillem competed with the Dutch pistol team and won a bronze medal.

== Mountaineer and explorer ==
When he was 19, Sillem climbed the Matterhorn from the northern side, with FG Waller. In 1902 he reached an altitude of 6,400 m (21,000 ft) on Nun in Kashmir. In 1905 he climbed the Aconcagua in the Andes. He also climbed Antarctica's Mount Kinsey and Mount Ellie.

In March 1906, Henrik Sillem made the first ascent of the West Ridge of Mount Cook in New Zealand with guide Peter Graham.

Sillem only reached the age of 40; in 1907 he fell while descending the Aiguille du Midi and was buried nearby, in Courmayeur.
