= Shooting at the 1900 Summer Olympics =

Shooting at the Games of the II Olympiad
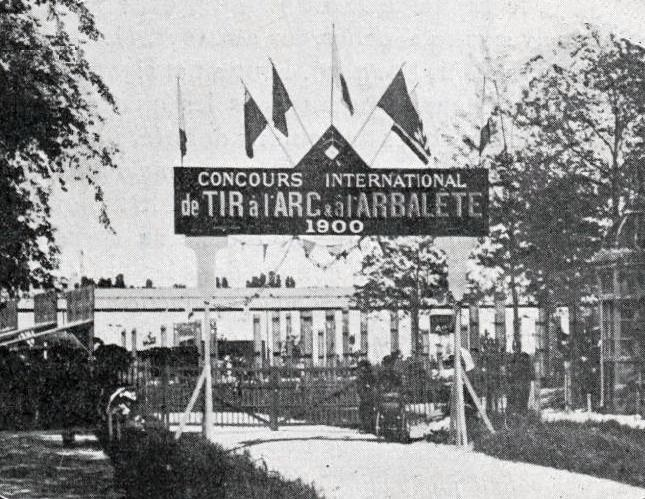
- Entrance to the target stand
- Venue: Satory
- Dates: 15 July – 5 August
- No. of events: 9 (9 men, 0 women)
- Competitors: 72 from 8 nations

At the 1900 Summer Olympics in Paris, many shooting events were featured within the concurrent 1900 Exposition Universelle, but only eight events currently are considered as "Olympic" by IOC. Before July 2021 the International Olympic Committee has never decided which events were "Olympic" and which were not. The competitions were held from 3 August to 5 August and took place at the military sporting complex in Satory and at Boulogne-Billancourt. According to Olympic historian Bill Mallon, one of these nine shooting events (20 metre military pistol) was an event for professionals with prize money and therefore does not meet inclusion criteria for 1900 Olympic Games events.

== Medal summary ==
Event	Gold	Silver	Bronze
50 metre free pistol, individual	Karl Röderer; Switzerland	Achille Paroche; France	Konrad Stäheli; Switzerland
50 metre free pistol, team	Switzerland; Friedrich Lüthi; Paul Probst; Louis Richardet; Karl Röderer; Konrad Stäheli	France; Louis Dutfoy; Maurice Lecoq; Léon Moreaux; Achille Paroche; Jules Trinité	Netherlands; Solko van den Bergh; Antonius Bouwens; Dirk Boest Gips; Henrik Sillem; Anthony Sweijs
300 metre free rifle, standing	Lars Jørgen Madsen; Denmark	Ole Østmo; Norway	Charles Paumier; Belgium
300 metre free rifle, kneeling	Konrad Stäheli; Switzerland	Emil Kellenberger; Switzerland Anders Peter Nielsen; Denmark	None awarded
300 metre free rifle, prone	Achille Paroche; France	Anders Peter Nielsen; Denmark	Ole Østmo; Norway
300 metre free rifle, 3 positions	Emil Kellenberger; Switzerland	Anders Peter Nielsen; Denmark	Paul Van Asbroeck; Belgium Ole Østmo; Norway
300 metre free rifle, team	Switzerland; Franz Böckli; Alfred Grütter; Emil Kellenberger; Louis Richardet; Konrad Stäheli	Norway; Olaf Frydenlund; Helmer Hermandsen; Ole Østmo; Ole Sæther; Tom Seeberg	France; Auguste Cavadini; Maurice Lecoq; Léon Moreaux; Achille Paroche; René Thomas
Trap	Roger de Barbarin; France	René Guyot; Belgium	Justinien de Clary; France

Event that currently is not considered as "Olympic" by IOC.

Event	Gold	Silver	Bronze
20 metre rapid fire pistol (professionals)	Maurice Larrouy; France	Léon Moreaux; France	Eugène Balme; France

== Excluded events ==
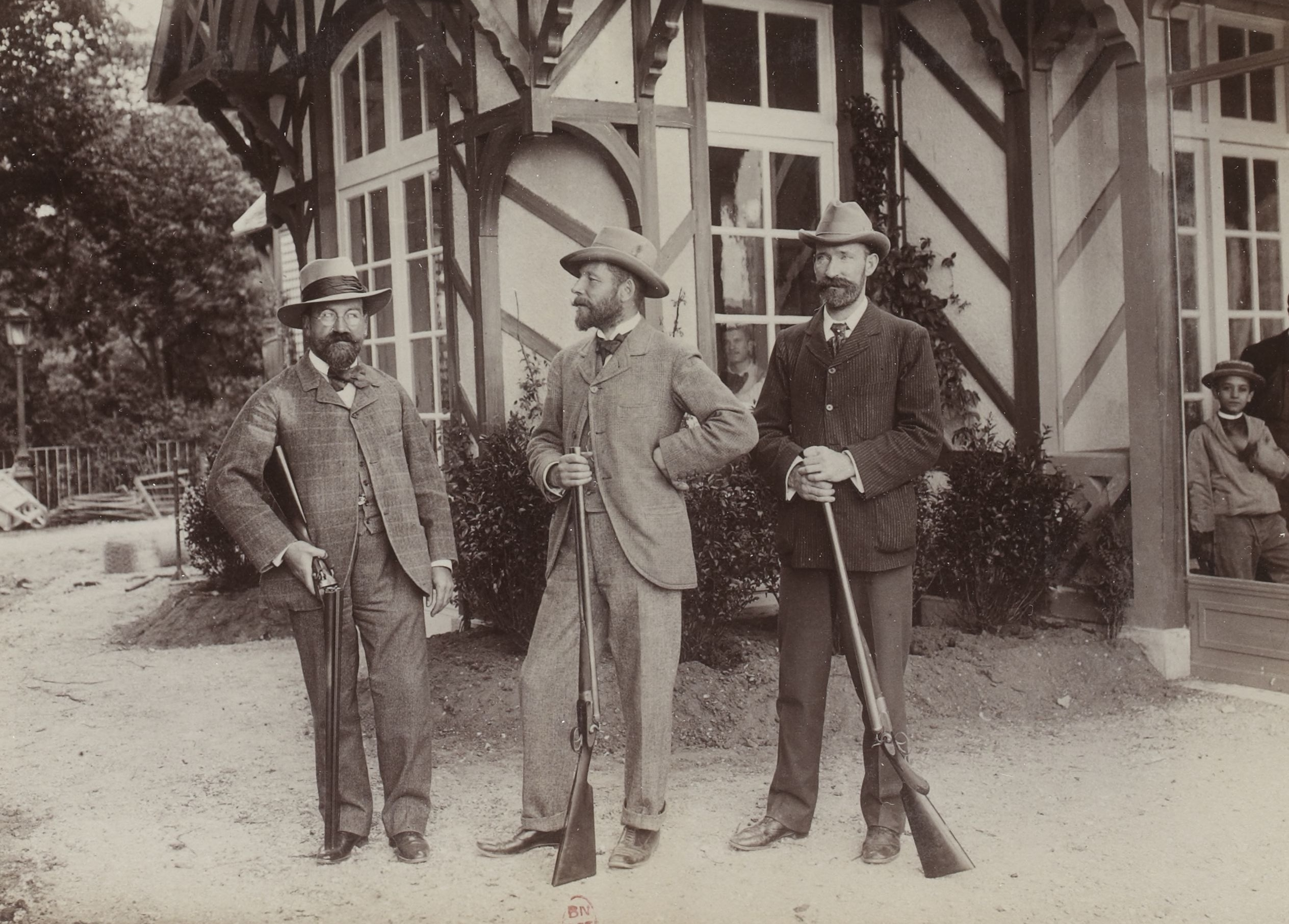
Contestants in the live pigeon shoot: Maurice Fauré (France), Léon de Lunden (Belgium), Donald Mackintosh (Australia)

Competitors in these events had to kill as many live pigeons as possible. Birds were released one at a time from 'traps' in front of the shooters; winners were determined by whoever shot the most birds out of the sky. A shooter was eliminated once they missed two birds. Nearly 300 birds were killed. A prize purse of up to 20,000 Francs was awarded to the winners, though the top four finishers agreed to split the winnings. This was the first and only time in Olympic history when animals were killed on purpose. Animal rights campaigns were mounted to stop live shooting; in 1902 bans came into force in the United States leading to the introduction of clay pigeons. The following results are not included in the IOC Olympic results list:

Live pigeon shooting – 20 franc entrance fee

Place	Athlete	Pigeons
1	Donald Mackintosh (AUS)	22
2	Pedro José Pidal y Bernaldo de Quirós (ESP)	21
3	Edgar Murphy (USA)	19

Live pigeon shooting – 200 franc entrance fee

Place	Athlete	Pigeons
1	Léon de Lunden (BEL)	21
2	Maurice Fauré (FRA)	20
3	Donald Mackintosh (AUS)	18
3	Crittenden Robinson (USA)	18

Running game target

Place	Athlete	Time
1	Louis Debray (FRA)	20
1	Pierre Nivet (FRA)	20
3	Comte de Lambert (FRA)	19

== Participating nations ==
A total of 72 shooters from 8 nations competed at the Paris Games:

- Belgium (11)
- Denmark (5)
- France (37)
- Great Britain (1)
- Netherlands (7)
- Norway (5)
- Romania (1)
- Switzerland (8)

== Medal table ==
20 metre military pistol event was an event for professionals with prize money. All three medals in this event were won by the French. It is not included in the IOC website's list of medal results and is not included in the table below.

Rank	Nation	Gold	Silver	Bronze	Total
1	Switzerland	5	1	1	7
2	France	2	2	2	6
3	Denmark	1	3	0	4
4	Norway	0	2	2	4
5	Belgium	0	1	2	3
6	Netherlands	0	0	1	1
Totals (6 entries)		8	9	8	25

== Bibliography ==
- International Olympic Committee medal winners database
- De Wael, Herman. Herman's Full Olympians: Shooting 1900. Retrieved 2 March 2006.
- Mallon, Bill (1998). The 1900 Olympic Games, Results for All Competitors in All Events, with Commentary. Jefferson, North Carolina: McFarland & Company, Inc., Publishers. ISBN 0-7864-0378-0.
