= Solko van den Bergh =

Dutch sport shooter

Olympic medal record

Men's shooting

Representing the Netherlands
Bronze medal – third place	1900 Paris	Team military pistol

Solko Johannes van den Bergh (4 June 1854 in The Hague – 25 December 1916 in The Hague) was a Dutch sport shooter.

Van den Bergh was a notary by profession who on 6 June 1880 married the noble Sophia Emma Nicoletta van Limburg Brouwer in Zeist. Together with his friend Henrik Sillem and the Frenchman François Monod he initiated the first "international shooting matches" (world championships in shooting) in 1897 in Lyon. These were the forerunners of the matches that were held in Paris in 1900, now considered to have been part of the Olympics. Van den Bergh participated in these and won a bronze medal with the Dutch pistol team.

His son Gerard van den Bergh won also one of the matches at the 1900 Summer Olympics.

Preceded by (France) Pierre de Coubertin	President of Organizing Committee for Summer Olympic Games; 1928	Succeeded by (United States) Mr. G. Bryant
