= Antonius Bouwens =

Dutch sport shooter (1876–1963)

Personal information
- Born: 22 May 1876 Hunsel, Netherlands
- Died: 28 March 1963 (aged 86) Beverwijk, Netherlands

Sport
- Sport: Sport shooting
Medal record
Men's shooting
Representing Netherlands
Olympic Games
Bronze medal – third place	1900 Paris	Team military pistol

Antonius Hubertus Maria "Antoine" Bouwens (22 May 1876 – 28 March 1963) was a Dutch sport shooter who competed in the early 20th century in pistol shooting. He participated in Shooting at the 1900 Summer Olympics in Paris and won a bronze medal with the Dutch pistol team. He also competed at the 1920 Summer Olympics.
