= Louis Richardet =

Swiss sports shooter (1864–1923)

Medal record

Men's shooting

Representing Switzerland

Olympic Games
Gold medal – first place	1900 Paris	Team military pistol
Gold medal – first place	1900 Paris	Team military rifle

Intercalated Games
Gold medal – first place	1906 Athens	25 m army pistol (standard model)
Gold medal – first place	1906 Athens	300 m army rifle
Gold medal – first place	1906 Athens	Team free rifle
Silver medal – second place	1906 Athens	Free rifle, prone
Silver medal – second place	1906 Athens	Free rifle, kneeling
Silver medal – second place	1906 Athens	200 m army rifle

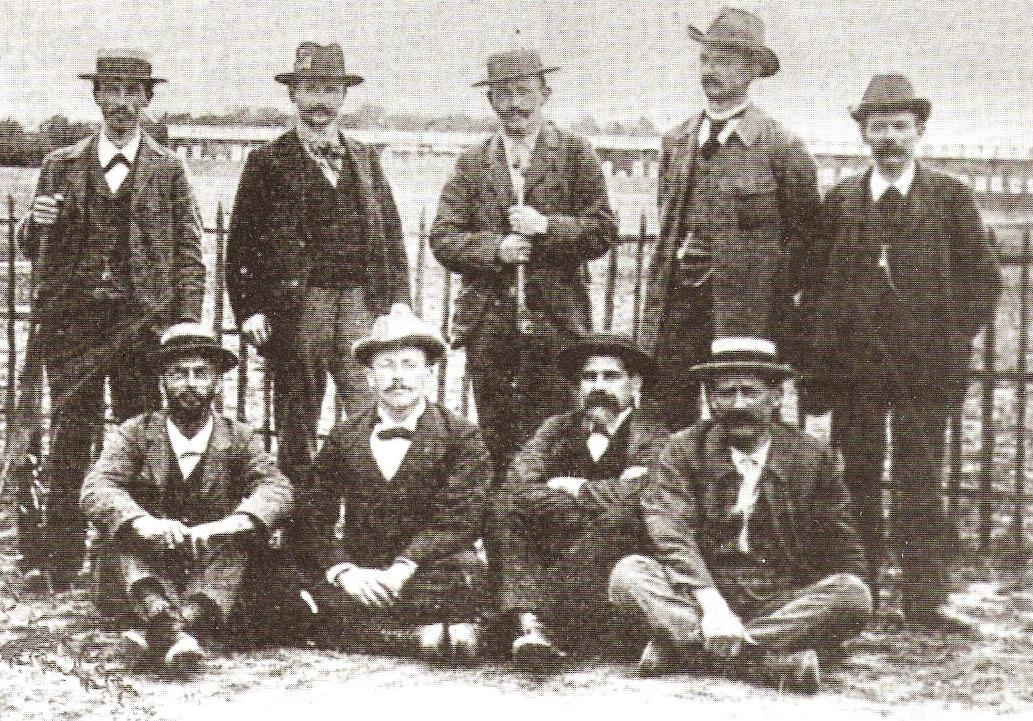
Shooting swiss 1900.jpg

Louis Marcel Richardet (17 May 1864 – 14 January 1923 in Geneva) was a Swiss sports shooter who competed in the early 20th century. He participated in Shooting at the 1900 Summer Olympics in Paris and won two gold medals with the Military pistol and rifle teams for Switzerland.
