= Switzerland at the 1948 Winter Olympics =

- IOC code: SUI
- NOC: Swiss Olympic Association
- Website: www.swissolympic.ch (in German and French)

in St. Moritz
- Competitors: 70 (59 men, 11 women) in 9 sports
- Flag bearer: Felix Endrich
- Medals Ranked 3rd: Gold 3 Silver 4 Bronze 3 Total 10

Winter Olympics appearances (overview)
- 1924; 1928; 1932; 1936; 1948; 1952; 1956; 1960; 1964; 1968; 1972; 1976; 1980; 1984; 1988; 1992; 1994; 1998; 2002; 2006; 2010; 2014; 2018; 2022; 2026

Switzerland was the host nation for the 1948 Winter Olympics in St. Moritz. It was the second time that Switzerland had hosted the Winter Games, after the 1928 Winter Olympics, also in St. Moritz.

== Medalists ==
Medal	Name	Sport	Event
Gold	Edy Reinalter	Alpine skiing	Men's slalom
Gold	Hedy Schlunegger	Alpine skiing	Women's downhill
Gold	Felix Endrich; Friedrich Waller	Bobsleigh	Two-man
Silver	Karl Molitor	Alpine skiing	Men's combined
Silver	Antoinette Meyer	Alpine skiing	Women's slalom
Silver	Fritz Feierabend; Paul Eberhard	Bobsleigh	Two-man
Silver	Hans Gerschwiler	Figure skating	Men's singles
Bronze	Karl Molitor	Alpine skiing	Men's downhill tie
Bronze	Rolf Olinger	Alpine skiing	Men's downhill tie
Bronze	Switzerland men's national ice hockey team: Hans Bänninger; Reto Perl; Emil Handschin; Ferdinand Cattini; Hans Cattini; Hanggi Boller; Hans Dürst; Walter Paul Dürst; Bibi Torriani; Gebhard Poltera; Ulrich Poltera; Hans-Martin Trepp; Beat Rüedi; Fredy Bieler; Heini Lohrer; Werner Lohrer; Otto Schubiger	Ice hockey	Men's competition

== Alpine skiing ==
Men

Athlete	Event	Race 1		Race 2		Total	
Athlete	Event	Time	Rank	Time	Rank	Time	Rank
Alfred Stäger	Downhill					DNF	–
Edy Reinalter	Downhill					3:11.0	22
Romedi Spada	Downhill					3:09.2	18
Adolf Odermatt	Downhill					3:06.4	11
Fernand Grosjean	Downhill					3:03.1	8
Ralph Olinger	Downhill					3:00.3	3rd place, bronze medalist(s)
Karl Molitor	Downhill					3:00.3	3rd place, bronze medalist(s)
Karl Gamma	Slalom	DNF	–	–	–	DNF	–
Georges Schneider	Slalom	1:11.9	14	1:06.5	13	2:18.4	13
Karl Molitor	Slalom	1:10.2	6	1:06.0	11	2:16.2	8
Edy Reinalter	Slalom	1:07.7	3	1:02.6	1	2:10.3	1st place, gold medalist(s)

Men's combined

The downhill part of this event was held along with the main medal event of downhill skiing. For athletes competing in both events, the same time was used (see table above for the results). The slalom part of the event was held separate from the main medal event of slalom skiing (included in table below).

Athlete	Slalom			Total (downhill + slalom)	
Athlete	Time 1	Time 2	Rank	Points	Rank
Adolf Odermatt	1:19.8	1:15.8	19	15.64	15
Fernand Grosjean	1:19.6	1:22.7 (+0:05)	30	16.61	16
Edy Reinalter	1:16.3	1:05.8	4	12.01	10
Karl Molitor	1:14.0	1:08.5	6	6.44	2nd place, silver medalist(s)

Women

Athlete	Event	Race 1		Race 2		Total	
Athlete	Event	Time	Rank	Time	Rank	Time	Rank
Olivia Ausoni	Downhill					2:45.1	24
Irène Molitor	Downhill					2:37.2	14
Antoinette Meyer	Downhill					2:35.4	11
Rosemarie Bleuer	Downhill					2:33.3	9
Lina Mittner	Downhill					2:31.2	5
Hedy Schlunegger	Downhill					2:28.3	1st place, gold medalist(s)
Olivia Ausoni	Slalom	1:18.7	22	59.9	8	2:18.6	17
Rosemarie Bleuer	Slalom	1:06.2	13	1:04.4	14	2:10.6	13
Renée Clerc	Slalom	1:03.8	8	1:02.0	9	2:05.8	5
Antoinette Meyer	Slalom	1:00.7	4	57.0	1	1:57.7	2nd place, silver medalist(s)

Women's combined

The downhill part of this event was held along with the main medal event of downhill skiing. For athletes competing in both events, the same time was used (see table above for the results). The slalom part of the event was held separate from the main medal event of slalom skiing (included in table below).

Athlete	Slalom			Total (downhill + slalom)	
Athlete	Time 1	Time 2	Rank	Points	Rank
Olivia Ausoni	1:44.4	1:08.5	27	38.02	26
Hedy Schlunegger	1:11.4	1:07.1	15	10.20	8
Rosemarie Bleuer	1:05.5	1:03.8	6	8.80	6
Lina Mittner	1:03.3	1:16.3	17	12.54	14

== Bobsleigh ==
Sled	Athletes	Event	Run 1		Run 2		Run 3		Run 4		Total	
Sled	Athletes	Event	Time	Rank	Time	Rank	Time	Rank	Time	Rank	Time	Rank
SUI-1	Fritz Feierabend; Paul Eberhard	Two-man	1:23.7	2	1:24.0	2	1:21.4	1	1:21.3	1	5:30.4	2nd place, silver medalist(s)
SUI-2	Felix Endrich; Friedrich Waller	Two-man	1:22.4	1	1:22.7	1	1:21.7	2	1:22.4	2	5:29.2	1st place, gold medalist(s)

Sled	Athletes	Event	Run 1		Run 2		Run 3		Run 4		Total	
Sled	Athletes	Event	Time	Rank	Time	Rank	Time	Rank	Time	Rank	Time	Rank
SUI-1	Fritz Feierabend; Friedrich Waller; Felix Endrich; Heinrich Angst	Four-man	1:16.9	1	1:21.2	8	1:22.3	7	1:21.7	3	5:22.1	4
SUI-2	Franz Kapus; Werner Spring; Bernhard Schilter; Paul Eberhard	Four-man	1:17.6	6	1:20.8	3	1:22.3	7	1:24.7	12	5:25.4	8

== Cross-country skiing ==
Men

Event	Athlete	Race	
Event	Athlete	Time	Rank
18 km	Gottlieb Perren	1'26:27	43
18 km	Karl Bricker	1'25:47	41
18 km	Alfons Supersaxo	1'24:29	34
18 km	Theo Allenbach	1'23:54	30
18 km	Robert Zurbriggen	1'22:51	26
18 km	Max Müller	1'22:40	25
18 km	Niklaus Stump	1'22:15	20
18 km	Edy Schild	1'22:15	20
50 km	Louis Bourban	4'33:50	19
50 km	Max Müller	4'30:51	17
50 km	Edy Schild	4'05:37	6

Men's 4 x 10 km relay

Athletes	Race	
Athletes	Time	Rank
Niklaus Stump; Robert Zurbriggen; Max Müller; Edi Schild	2'48:07	5

== Figure skating ==
Men

Athlete	CF	FS	Points	Places	Final rank
Karl Enderlin	14	10	154.244	110	14
Hans Gerschwiler	2	3	181.122	23	2nd place, silver medalist(s)

Women

Athlete	CF	FS	Points	Places	Final rank
Doris Blanc	24	25	122.622	221	25
Lotti Höner	20	22	134.211	186	23
Maja Hug	13	19	141.522	137	15

Pairs

Athletes	Points	Places	Final rank
Luny Unold; Hans Kuster	9.281	120	12

== Ice hockey ==
The tournament was run in a round-robin format with nine teams participating.

	Pld	W	L	T	GF	GA	Pts
Canada	8	7	0	1	69	5	15
Czechoslovakia	8	7	0	1	80	18	15
Switzerland (bronze)	8	6	2	0	67	21	12
Sweden	8	4	4	0	55	28	8
Great Britain	8	3	5	0	39	47	6
Poland	8	2	6	0	29	97	4
Austria	8	1	7	0	33	77	2
Italy	8	0	8	0	24	156	0
United States *	8	5	3	0	86	33	10

* United States team was disqualified. Only eight teams are officially ranked.

- Switzerland 5-4 USA
- Switzerland 16-0 Italy
- Switzerland 11-2 Austria
- Switzerland 12-3 United Kingdom
- Switzerland 8-2 Sweden
- Switzerland 14-0 Poland
- Czechoslovakia 7-1 Switzerland
- Canada 3-0 Switzerland

Bronze:
Hans Bänninger
Reto Perl
Emil Handschin
Ferdinand Cattini
Hans Cattini
Hanggi Boller
Hans Dürst
Walter Paul Dürst
Bibi Torriani
Gebhard Poltera
Ulrich Poltera
Hans-Martin Trepp
Beat Rüedi
Fredy Bieler
Heini Lohrer
Werner Lohrer
Otto Schubiger

== Nordic combined ==
Events:

- 18 km cross-country skiing
- normal hill ski jumping

The cross-country skiing part of this event was combined with the main medal event, meaning that athletes competing here were skiing for two disciplines at the same time. Details can be found above in this article, in the cross-country skiing section.

The ski jumping (normal hill) event was held separate from the main medal event of ski jumping, results can be found in the table below. Athletes would perform three jumps, of which the two best jumps (distance and form) were counted.

Athlete	Event	Cross-country		Ski Jumping					Total	
Athlete	Event	Points	Rank	Distance 1	Distance 2	Distance 3	Points	Rank	Points	Rank
Gottlieb Perren	Individual	186.00	20	56.0	57.5	56.5	187.8	26	373.80	18
Alfons Supersaxo	Individual	196.50	16	63.0	57.0	61.5	203.9	13	400.40	13
Theo Allenbach	Individual	199.50	12	52.5	52.0	50.0	176.6	32	376.10	17
Niklaus Stump	Individual	208.50	7	65.5	63.5 (fall)	60.0	213.0	5	421.50	4

== Skeleton ==
Athlete	Run 1		Run 2		Run 3		Run 4		Run 5		Run 6		Total	
Athlete	Time	Rank	Time	Rank	Time	Rank	Time	Rank	Time	Rank	Time	Rank	Time	Rank
Christian Fischbacher	DNF	–	–	–	–	–	–	–	–	–	–	–	DNF	–
Dialma Baseglia	49.2	11	49.0	10	48.6	6	DNF	–	–	–	–	–	DNF	–
Gottfried Kägi	48.9	10	48.8	8	48.7	7	1:00.8	4	1:01.6	5	1:01.1	4	5:29.9	5
Milo Bigler	48.4	7	48.4	5	48.7	7	2:00.2	10	1:02.1	8	DNF	–	DNF	–

== Ski jumping ==
Athlete	Event	Distance 1	Distance 2	Total points	Rank
Willi Klopfenstein	Normal hill	60.0	62.5	209.3	13
Andreas Däscher	Normal hill	61.0	61.0	203.8	17
Hans Zurbriggen	Normal hill	61.0	67.0	214.0	10
Fritz Tschannen	Normal hill	64.5	66.0	214.8	9

== Speed skating ==
Men

Event	Athlete	Race	
Event	Athlete	Time	Rank
500 m	Rudolf Kleiner	47.8	39
1500 m	Sepp Rogger	2:34.7	43
1500 m	Rudolf Kleiner	2:33.0	42
1500 m	Hanspeter Vogt	2:30.5	34
5000 m	Alfred Altenburger	9:40.6	39
5000 m	Sepp Rogger	9:29.3	34
5000 m	Heinz Hügelshofer	9:21.3	33
