= Switzerland at the Olympics =

- IOC code: SUI
- NOC: Swiss Olympic Association
- Website: www.swissolympic.ch (in German and French)
- Medals Ranked 19th: Gold 122 Silver 138 Bronze 143 Total 403

Summer appearances
- 1896; 1900; ~~1904~~; 1908; 1912; 1920; 1924; 1928; 1932; 1936; 1948; 1952; 1956; 1960; 1964; 1968; 1972; 1976; 1980; 1984; 1988; 1992; 1996; 2000; 2004; 2008; 2012; 2016; 2020; 2024; 2028

Winter appearances
- 1924; 1928; 1932; 1936; 1948; 1952; 1956; 1960; 1964; 1968; 1972; 1976; 1980; 1984; 1988; 1992; 1994; 1998; 2002; 2006; 2010; 2014; 2018; 2022; 2026

Other related appearances
- 1906 Intercalated Games

Switzerland has sent athletes to compete in every Olympic Games since it first participated in the inaugural 1896 Summer Olympics in Athens. Switzerland boycotted the main events of the 1956 Summer Olympics held in Melbourne, joining several other nations in protest of the Soviet Union's invasion of Hungary, due to the Hungarian Uprising. However, Swiss athletes did take part in the equestrian events, which were held earlier that year in Stockholm, Sweden, due to Australian quarantine laws. The Swiss dressage team earned a bronze medal in those competitions.

In addition to its sporting achievements, Switzerland holds a unique place in Olympic history as the only country to have won medals in all three discontinued categories of Olympic medals for art and special feats: aeronautics, alpinism, and art competitions. These awards were once part of the Olympic program in the early 20th century. Unlike alpinism and the art competitions, which awarded medals at multiple Games, only one medal was ever awarded for aeronautics. Swiss pilot Hermann Schreiber was honored with an Olympic gold medal in at the 1936 Summer Olympics, for being the first person to cross the Alps in a glider.

Switzerland is also the home of the International Olympic Committee (IOC), whose headquarters are based in Lausanne. The Swiss National Olympic Committee, known as Swiss Olympic, was established and recognized by the IOC in 1912.

== Hosted Games ==
Switzerland has hosted the Games on two occasions, both in St. Moritz. The nation has never hosted the Summer Olympics.

Games	Host city	Dates	Nations	Participants	Events
1928 Winter Olympics	St. Moritz, Grisons	11 – 19 February	25	464	14
1948 Winter Olympics	St. Moritz, Grisons	30 January – 8 February	28	669	22

== Medal tables ==
=== Medals by Summer Games ===
Games	Athletes	Gold	Silver	Bronze	Total	Rank
(Kingdom of Greece) 1896 Athens	3	1	2	0	3	10
(French Third Republic) 1900 Paris	18	6	3	1	10	5
(United States) 1904 St. Louis	did not participate					
(United Kingdom) 1908 London	1	0	0	0	0	–
(Sweden) 1912 Stockholm	1	0	0	0	0	–
(Belgium) 1920 Antwerp	77	2	2	7	11	13
(French Third Republic) 1924 Paris	141	7	8	10	25	6
(Netherlands) 1928 Amsterdam	133	7	4	4	15	6
(United States) 1932 Los Angeles	6	0	1	0	1	22
(Nazi Germany) 1936 Berlin	190	1	9	5	15	16
(United Kingdom) 1948 London	181	5	10	5	20	9
(Finland) 1952 Helsinki	157	2	6	6	14	11
(Australia) 1956 Melbourne	3	0	0	1	1	35
(Italy) 1960 Rome	149	0	3	3	6	24
(Japan) 1964 Tokyo	66	1	2	1	4	22
1968 Mexico City	85	0	1	4	5	33
(West Germany) 1972 Munich	151	0	3	0	3	26
(Canada) 1976 Montreal	50	1	1	2	4	20
(Soviet Union) 1980 Moscow	86	2	0	0	2	19
(United States) 1984 Los Angeles	129	0	4	4	8	26
(South Korea) 1988 Seoul	99	0	2	2	4	33
(Spain) 1992 Barcelona	102	1	0	0	1	37
(United States) 1996 Atlanta	114	4	3	0	7	18
(Australia) 2000 Sydney	102	1	6	2	9	37
(Greece) 2004 Athens	98	1	1	3	5	46
(China) 2008 Beijing	84	2	1	4	7	33
(United Kingdom) 2012 London	103	2	2	0	4	33
(Brazil) 2016 Rio de Janeiro	104	3	2	2	7	24
(Japan) 2020 Tokyo	107	3	4	6	13	24
(France) 2024 Paris	127	1	2	5	8	48
(United States) 2028 Los Angeles	future event					
(Australia) 2032 Brisbane	future event					
Total (29/30)	2,667	53	82	77	212	25

Notes

- ^{ART} Art competitions (1912–1948) are not included in the medal table above, as they were non-sports events formerly part of the Olympic Games. (Note: In 1952, art competition medals, as well as the gold medal awards for feats in alpinism and aeronautics, were removed from the official national medal counts. Only since 2021 have they been officially listed again by the IOC in the medal tables and respective National Olympic Committee (NOC) profiles on its website.) Switzerland won a total of seven art competition medals (2 gold, 4 silver and 1 bronze), across the 1912, 1928, 1936, and 1948 Summer Olympics.
- ^{FEAT} Olympic gold medals awarded for feats of alpinism and aeronautics are not included in the medal table above, as the IOC classifies these awards as separate from the official Olympic sports programme. At the 1936 Games, Switzerland won two such gold medals: one in alpinism for the 1930 and 1934 Himalaya expeditions, awarded to Günter Dyhrenfurth and his wife Hettie, and one in aeronautics for the first crossing of the Alps by glider in 1935, awarded to Hermann Schreiber.
- ^{NAT} Athletes at the early Olympic Games (1896–1904) are attributed by the International Olympic Committee (IOC) according to the national affiliation of their club or team, rather than their nationality. (Note: In 2024, the IOC reinstated its original and current attribution policy for athletes at the early Olympic Games (1896–1904). From 2021 to 2024, the IOC briefly attributed medals in individual events according to the athlete's nationality, even when the athlete represented a foreign club or team. Since 2024, participation and medals have instead been attributed according to the national affiliation of the club or team represented by the athlete.)
  - 1900 Olympic Games:
    American Pauline Whittier (USA) (golf; one silver), represented a Swiss club, and her participation and medal were therefore attributed to Switzerland.
  - 1904 Olympic Games:
    Conversely, Swiss Adolf Spinnler (gymnastics; one gold and one bronze) represented a German club, while Gustav Thiefenthaler (wrestling; one bronze) represented an American club; their medals were therefore attributed to Germany and United States, respectively.

=== Medals by Winter Games ===
Host country

Games	Athletes	Gold	Silver	Bronze	Total	Rank
(France) 1924 Chamonix	30	2	0	1	3	4
(Switzerland) 1928 St. Moritz	41	0	0	1	1	8
(United States) 1932 Lake Placid	7	0	1	0	1	8
(Nazi Germany) 1936 Garmisch-Partenkirchen	34	1	2	0	3	5
(Switzerland) 1948 St. Moritz	70	3	4	3	10	3
(Norway) 1952 Oslo	55	0	0	2	2	11
(Italy) 1956 Cortina d'Ampezzo	59	3	2	1	6	4
(United States) 1960 Squaw Valley	21	2	0	0	2	8
(Austria) 1964 Innsbruck	72	0	0	0	0	–
(France) 1968 Grenoble	34	0	2	4	6	14
(Japan) 1972 Sapporo	52	4	3	3	10	3
(Austria) 1976 Innsbruck	59	1	3	1	5	8
(United States) 1980 Lake Placid	44	1	1	3	5	10
(Socialist Federal Republic of Yugoslavia) 1984 Sarajevo	42	2	2	1	5	7
(Canada) 1988 Calgary	70	5	5	5	15	3
(France) 1992 Albertville	74	1	0	2	3	14
(Norway) 1994 Lillehammer	59	3	4	2	9	8
(Japan) 1998 Nagano	69	2	2	3	7	12
(United States) 2002 Salt Lake City	110	3	2	6	11	11
(Italy) 2006 Turin	140	5	4	5	14	8
(Canada) 2010 Vancouver	146	6	0	3	9	6
(Russia) 2014 Sochi	163	7	2	2	11	7
(South Korea) 2018 Pyeongchang	166	5	6	4	15	7
(China) 2022 Beijing	167	7	2	6	15	8
(Italy) 2026 Milano Cortina	175	6	9	8	23	8
(France) 2030 French Alps	future event					
(United States) 2034 Utah	future event					
Total (25/25)	1,959	69	56	66	191	8

=== Medals by summer sport ===
Sport	Gold	Silver	Bronze	Total
Gymnastics	15	19	13	47
Shooting	8	6	11	25
Rowing	7	8	10	25
Cycling	6	11	9	26
Equestrian	5	11	8	24
Wrestling	4	4	6	14
Tennis	3	3	0	6
Triathlon	2	2	2	6
Fencing	1	4	3	8
Sailing	1	2	1	4
Judo	1	1	2	4
Athletics	0	6	2	8
Weightlifting	0	2	2	4
Canoeing	0	1	0	1
Football	0	1	0	1
Golf	0	1	0	1
Swimming	0	0	4	4
Beach volleyball	0	0	3	3
Handball	0	0	1	1
Totals (19 entries)	53	82	77	212

*Medals awarded for special feats and in artistic events are not included, as the IOC classifies these events as separate from the official Olympic sports programme.

=== Medals by winter sport ===
Sport	Gold	Silver	Bronze	Total
Alpine skiing	31	26	27	84
Bobsleigh	10	10	12	32
Snowboarding	8	2	4	14
Freestyle skiing	7	6	5	18
Cross country skiing	4	1	5	10
Ski jumping	4	1	1	6
Curling	1	4	4	9
Nordic combined	1	2	1	4
Ski mountaineering	1	1	0	2
Skeleton	1	0	2	3
Military patrol	1	0	0	1
Figure skating	0	2	1	3
Biathlon	0	1	0	1
Ice hockey	0	0	4	4
Totals (14 entries)	69	56	66	191

*Military patrol is considered to be the precursor to biathlon, however the official website of the Olympic Movement designates military patrol as a separate discipline. The Official Report of the 1924 Games regards it as an event within the sport of skiing.

== List of medalists ==
=== Summer Olympics ===
Key
†	Denotes Olympic gold medals for special feats

Medal	Name	Games	Sport	Event
Gold	Louis Zutter	1896 Athens	Gymnastics (Artistic)	Men's pommel horse
Silver	Louis Zutter	1896 Athens	Gymnastics (Artistic)	Men's parallel bars
Silver	Louis Zutter	1896 Athens	Gymnastics (Artistic)	Men's vault
Gold	Bernard de Pourtalès; Hélène de Pourtalès; Hermann de Pourtalès	1900 Paris	Sailing	1-2 ton race 1
Gold	Karl Röderer	1900 Paris	Shooting	50m free pistol
Gold	Konrad Stäheli	1900 Paris	Shooting	300m free rifle kneeing
Gold	Emil Kellenberger	1900 Paris	Shooting	300m free rifle 3 positions
Gold	Friedrich Lüthi; Paul Probst; Louis Richardet; Karl Röderer; Konrad Stäheli	1900 Paris	Shooting	Team 50m free pistol
Gold	Franz Böckli; Alfred Grütter; Emil Kellenberger; Louis Richardet; Konrad Stäheli	1900 Paris	Shooting	Team 300m free rifle
Silver	Bernard de Pourtalès; Hélène de Pourtalès; Hermann de Pourtalès	1900 Paris	Sailing	1-2 ton race 2
Silver	Emil Kellenberger	1900 Paris	Shooting	300m free rifle kneeing
Silver	Pauline Whittier (USA)	1900 Paris	Golf	Women's individual
Bronze	Konrad Stäheli	1900 Paris	Shooting	50m free pistol
Gold	Willy Brüderlin; Max Rudolf; Paul Rudolf; Hans Walter; Paul Staub	1920 Antwerp	Rowing	Men's coxed four
Gold	Robert Roth	1920 Antwerp	Wrestling (Freestyle)	Men's heavyweight
Silver	Fritz Hünenberger	1920 Antwerp	Weightlifting	Men's light-heavyweight
Silver	Charles Courant	1920 Antwerp	Wrestling (Freestyle)	Men's light heavyweight
Bronze	Édouard Candeveau; Alfred Felber; Paul Piaget	1920 Antwerp	Rowing	Men's coxed pair
Bronze	Fritz Zulauf	1920 Antwerp	Shooting	30m military pistol
Bronze	Fritz Kuchen	1920 Antwerp	Shooting	300m military rifle prone
Bronze	Gustave Amoudruz; Hans Egli; Domenico Giambonini; Joseph Jehle; Fritz Zulauf	1920 Antwerp	Shooting	Team 30 m military pistol
Bronze	Gustave Amoudruz; Ulrich Fahrner; Fritz Kuchen; Werner Schneeberger; Bernard Siegenthaler	1920 Antwerp	Shooting	Team free rifle 3 positions
Bronze	Eugene Addor; Joseph Jehle; Fritz Kuchen; Werner Schneeberger; Weibel	1920 Antwerp	Shooting	Team military rifle, 300 m + 600 m
Bronze	Eugène Ryter	1920 Antwerp	Weightlifting	Men's featherweight
Gold	Alphonse Gemuseus	1924 Paris	Equestrian	Individual jumping
Gold	August Güttinger	1924 Paris	Gymnastics (Artistic)	Men's parallel bars
Gold	Josef Wilhelm	1924 Paris	Gymnastics (Artistic)	Men's pommel horse
Gold	Édouard Candeveau; Alfred Felber; Émile Lachapelle	1924 Paris	Rowing	Men's coxed pair
Gold	Émile Albrecht; Alfred Probst; Eugen Sigg; Hans Walter; Émile Lachapelle	1924 Paris	Rowing	Men's coxed four
Gold	Hermann Gehri	1924 Paris	Wrestling (Freestyle)	Men's welterweight
Gold	Fritz Hagmann	1924 Paris	Wrestling (Freestyle)	Men's horizontal bar
Silver	Paul Martin	1924 Paris	Athletics	Men's 800 m
Silver	Willy Schärer	1924 Paris	Athletics	Men's 1500 m
Silver	Hans Bühler; Alphonse Gemuseus; Werner Stuber	1924 Paris	Equestrian	Team jumping
Silver	Football team: Max Abegglen Félix Bédouret Charles Bouvier Walter Dietrich Karl Ehrenbolger Paul Fässler Gustav Gottenkieny Jean Haag Marcel Katz Edmond Kramer Adolphe Mengotti August Oberhauser Robert Pache Aron Pollitz Hans Pulver Rudolf Ramseyer Adolphe Reymond Louis Richard Teo Schär Paul Schmiedlin Paul Sturzenegger Walter Weiler	1924 Paris	Football	Men's tournament
Silver	Jean Gutweniger	1924 Paris	Gymnastics (Artistic)	Men's parallel bars
Silver	Jean Gutweniger	1924 Paris	Gymnastics (Artistic)	Men's pommel horse
Silver	Fritz Hünenberger	1924 Paris	Weightlifting	Men's light-heavyweight
Silver	Henri Wernli	1924 Paris	Wrestling (Freestyle)	Men's heavyweight
Bronze	Antoine Rebetez	1924 Paris	Gymnastics (Artistic)	Men's pommel horse
Bronze	August Güttinger	1924 Paris	Gymnastics (Artistic)	Men's rope climbing
Bronze	Hans Grieder; August Güttinger; Jean Gutweniger; Georges Miez; Otto Pfister; Antoine Rebetez; Carl Widmer; Josef Wilhelm	1924 Paris	Gymnastics (Artistic)	Men's team all-around
Bronze	Josef Schneider; Heini Thoma	1924 Paris	Rowing	Men's single sculls
Bronze	Rudolf Bosshard; Heini Thoma	1924 Paris	Rowing	Men's double sculls
Bronze	Émile Albrecht; Alfred Probst; Eugen Sigg; Hans Walter	1924 Paris	Rowing	Men's coxless four
Bronze	Josias Hartmann	1924 Paris	Shooting	50m rifle prone
Bronze	Arthur Reinmann	1924 Paris	Weightlifting	Men's featherweight
Bronze	Otto Müller	1924 Paris	Wrestling (Freestyle)	Men's welterweight
Bronze	Charles Courant	1924 Paris	Wrestling (Freestyle)	Men's light heavyweight
Gold	Georges Miez	1928 Amsterdam	Gymnastics (Artistic)	Men's horizontal bar
Gold	Georges Miez	1928 Amsterdam	Gymnastics (Artistic)	Men's individual all-around
Gold	Hermann Hänggi	1928 Amsterdam	Gymnastics (Artistic)	Men's pommel horse
Gold	Hans Grieder; August Güttinger; Hermann Hänggi; Eugen Mack; Georges Miez; Otto Pfister; Eduard Steinemann; Melchior Wezel	1928 Amsterdam	Gymnastics (Artistic)	Men's team all-around
Gold	Eugen Mack	1928 Amsterdam	Gymnastics (Artistic)	Men's vault
Gold	Hans Bourquin; Hans Schöchlin; Karl Schöchlin	1928 Amsterdam	Rowing	Men's coxed pair
Gold	Ernst Kyburz	1928 Amsterdam	Wrestling (Freestyle)	Men's middleweight
Silver	Hermann Hänggi	1928 Amsterdam	Gymnastics (Artistic)	Men's individual all-around
Silver	Georges Miez	1928 Amsterdam	Gymnastics (Artistic)	Men's pommel horse
Silver	Ernst Haas; Joseph Meyer; Otto Bucher; Karl Schwegler; Fritz Bösch	1928 Amsterdam	Rowing	Men's coxed fours
Silver	Arnold Bögli	1928 Amsterdam	Wrestling (Freestyle)	Men's light heavyweight
Bronze	Charles-Gustave Kuhn	1928 Amsterdam	Equestrian	Individual jumping
Bronze	Eugen Mack	1928 Amsterdam	Gymnastics (Artistic)	Men's horizontal bar
Bronze	Hermann Hänggi	1928 Amsterdam	Gymnastics (Artistic)	Men's parallel bars
Bronze	Hans Minder	1928 Amsterdam	Wrestling (Freestyle)	Men's featherweight
Silver	Georges Miez	1932 Los Angeles	Gymnastics (Artistic)	Men's floor exercises
Gold	Georges Miez	1936 Berlin	Gymnastics (Artistic)	Men's floor exercises
Gold	Arthur Tell Schwab	1936 Berlin	Athletics	Men's 50 km walk
Gold	Hermann Schreiber^{†}	1936 Berlin	Aeronautics	Crossing the Alps with a glider
Gold	Günter Oskar Dyhrenfurth^{†} Hettie Dyhrenfurth^{†}	1936 Berlin	Alpinism	Himalaya expeditions of 1930 and 1934
Silver	Edgar Buchwalder; Ernst Nievergelt; Kurt Ott	1936 Berlin	Cycling (Road)	Men's team road race
Silver	Josef Walter	1936 Berlin	Gymnastics (Artistic)	Men's floor exercises
Silver	Eugen Mack	1936 Berlin	Gymnastics (Artistic)	Men's individual all-around
Silver	Michael Reusch	1936 Berlin	Gymnastics (Artistic)	Men's parallel bars
Silver	Eugen Mack	1936 Berlin	Gymnastics (Artistic)	Men's pommel horse
Silver	Walter Bach; Albert Bachmann; Walter Beck; Eugen Mack; Georges Miez; Michael Reusch; Eduard Steinemann; Josef Walter	1936 Berlin	Gymnastics (Artistic)	Men's team all-around
Silver	Eugen Mack	1936 Berlin	Gymnastics (Artistic)	Men's vault
Silver	Hermann Betschart; Alex Homberger; Hans Homberger; Karl Schmid; Rolf Spring	1936 Berlin	Rowing	Men's coxed fours
Bronze	Ernst Nievergelt	1936 Berlin	Cycling (Road)	Men's individual road race
Bronze	Eugen Mack	1936 Berlin	Gymnastics (Artistic)	Men's floor exercises
Bronze	Albert Bachmann	1936 Berlin	Gymnastics (Artistic)	Men's pommel horse
Bronze	Handball team: Max Bloesch Rolf Fäs Burkhard Gantenbein Willy Gysi Erland Herkenrath Ernst Hufschmid Willy Hufschmid Werner Meyer Georg Mischon Willy Schäfer Werner Scheurmann Edy Schmid Erich Schmitt Eugen Seiterle Max Streib Robert Studer Rudolf Wirz	1936 Berlin	Handball	Men's tournament
Bronze	Hermann Betschart; Alex Homberger; Hans Homberger; Karl Schmid	1936 Berlin	Rowing	Men's coxless fours
Gold	Hans Moser	1948 London	Equestrian	Individual Dressage
Gold	Josef Stalder	1948 London	Gymnastics (Artistic)	Men's horizontal bar
Gold	Michael Reusch	1948 London	Gymnastics (Artistic)	Men's parallel bars
Gold	Karl Frei	1948 London	Gymnastics (Artistic)	Men's rings
Gold	Emil Grünig	1948 London	Shooting	Men's 300m free rifle 3 positions
Silver	Gaston Godel	1948 London	Athletics	Men's 50 km walk
Silver	Oswald Zappelli	1948 London	Fencing	Men's individual épée
Silver	Walter Lehmann	1948 London	Gymnastics (Artistic)	Men's horizontal bar
Silver	Walter Lehmann	1948 London	Gymnastics (Artistic)	Men's individual all-round
Silver	Michael Reusch	1948 London	Gymnastics (Artistic)	Men's rings
Silver	Karl Frei; Christian Kipfer; Walter Lehmann; Robert Lucy; Michael Reusch; Josef Stalder; Emil Studer; Melchior Thalmann	1948 London	Gymnastics (Artistic)	Men's team competition
Silver	Hans Kalt; Josef Kalt	1948 London	Rowing	Men's coxless pair
Silver	Émile Knecht; Andre Moccand; Rudolf Reichling; Erich Schriever; Pierre Armand Stebler	1948 London	Rowing	Men's four-oared shell with coxswain
Silver	Rudolf Schnyder	1948 London	Shooting	Men's 50m pistol (60 shots)
Silver	Fritz Stöckli	1948 London	Wrestling (Freestyle)	Men's light-heavyweight
Bronze	Fritz Schwab	1948 London	Athletics	Men's 10,000m walk
Bronze	Christian Kipfer	1948 London	Gymnastics (Artistic)	Men's parallel bars
Bronze	Josef Stalder	1948 London	Gymnastics (Artistic)	Men's parallel bars
Bronze	Adolf Müller	1948 London	Wrestling (Freestyle)	Men's featherweight
Bronze	Hermann Baumann	1948 London	Wrestling (Freestyle)	Men's lightweight
Gold	Jack Günthard	1952 Helsinki	Gymnastics (Artistic)	Men's horizontal bar
Gold	Hans Eugster	1952 Helsinki	Gymnastics (Artistic)	Men's parallel bars
Silver	Fritz Schwab	1952 Helsinki	Athletics	Men's 10,000m walk
Silver	Henri Chammartin; Gustav Fischer; Gottfried Trachsel	1952 Helsinki	Equestrian	Dressage team
Silver	Josef Stalder	1952 Helsinki	Gymnastics (Artistic)	Men's horizontal bar
Silver	Hans Eugster; Jack Günthard; Ernst Fivian; Ernst Gebendinger; Hans Schwarzentruber; Josef Stalder; Jean Tschabold; Melchior Thalmann	1952 Helsinki	Gymnastics (Artistic)	Men's team competition
Silver	Rico Bianchi; Émile Ess; Walter Leiser; Heini Scheller; Karl Weidmann	1952 Helsinki	Rowing	Men's four-oared shell with coxswain
Silver	Robert Bürchler-Messer	1952 Helsinki	Shooting	Men's 300m free rifle 3 positions
Bronze	Oswald Zappelli	1952 Helsinki	Fencing	Men's individual épée
Bronze	Paul Barth; Willy Fitting; Paul Meister; Otto Rüfenacht; Mario Valota; Oswald Zappelli	1952 Helsinki	Fencing	Men's team épée
Bronze	Josef Stalder	1952 Helsinki	Gymnastics (Artistic)	Men's individual all-round
Bronze	Josef Stalder	1952 Helsinki	Gymnastics (Artistic)	Men's parallel bars
Bronze	Hans Eugster	1952 Helsinki	Gymnastics (Artistic)	Men's rings
Bronze	Hans Kalt; Kurt Schmid	1952 Helsinki	Rowing	Men's coxless pair
Bronze	Henri Chammartin; Gustav Fischer; Gottfried Trachsel	1956 Melbourne (Stockholm)	Equestrian	Dressage team
Silver	Gustav Fischer	1960 Rome	Equestrian	Individual dressage
Silver	Anton Bühler; Rudolf Günthardt; Hans Schwarzenbach	1960 Rome	Equestrian	Team eventing
Silver	Hansrudi Spillman	1960 Rome	Shooting	Men's 300m free rifle 3 positions
Bronze	Anton Bühler	1960 Rome	Equestrian	Individual eventing
Bronze	Ernst Hürlimann; Rolf Larcher	1960 Rome	Rowing	Men's double sculls
Bronze	Henri Copponex; Pierre Girard; Manfred Metzger	1960 Rome	Sailing	Men's 5½ Meter Class
Gold	Henri Chammartin	1964 Tokyo	Equestrian	Individual dressage
Silver	Henri Chammartin; Gustav Fischer; Marianne Gossweiler	1964 Tokyo	Equestrian	Team dressage
Silver	Eric Hänni	1964 Tokyo	Judo	Men's lightweight
Bronze	Gottfried Kottmann	1964 Tokyo	Rowing	Men's single sculls
Silver	Bernard Dunand; Louis Noverraz; Marcel Stern	1968 Mexico City	Sailing	Men's 5½ Meter Class
Bronze	Xaver Kurmann	1968 Mexico City	Cycling (Track)	Men's individual pursuit
Bronze	Henri Chammartin; Gustav Fischer; Marianne Gossweiler	1968 Mexico City	Equestrian	Team dressage
Bronze	Peter Bolliger; Gottlieb Fröhlich; Jakob Grob; Denis Oswald; Hugo Waser	1968 Mexico City	Rowing	Men's four-oared shell with coxswain
Bronze	Kurt Müller	1968 Mexico City	Shooting	Men's 300m free rifle 3 positions
Silver	Xaver Kurmann	1972 Munich	Cycling (Track)	Men's individual pursuit
Silver	Jean-Blaise Evequoz; Daniel Giger; Christian Kauter; Peter Lötscher; Francois Suchanecki	1972 Munich	Fencing	Men's team épée
Silver	Alfred Bachmann; Heinrich Fischer	1972 Munich	Rowing	Men's coxless pair
Gold	Christine Stückelberger	1976 Montreal	Equestrian	Individual dressage
Silver	Ulrich Lehmann; Doris Ramseier; Christine Stückelberger	1976 Montreal	Equestrian	Team dressage
Bronze	Jean-Blaise Evequoz; Daniel Giger; Christian Kauter; Michel Poffet; Francois Suchanecki	1976 Montreal	Fencing	Men's épée team
Bronze	Jürg Röthlisberger	1976 Montreal	Judo	Men's half-heavyweight
Gold	Robert Dill-Bundi	1980 Moscow	Cycling (Track)	Men's individual pursuit
Gold	Jürg Röthlisberger	1980 Moscow	Judo	Men's middleweight
Silver	Markus Ryffel	1984 Los Angeles	Athletics	Men's 5,000m
Silver	Alfred Achermann; Richard Trinkler; Laurent Vial; Benno Wiss	1984 Los Angeles	Cycling (Road)	Men's team time trial
Silver	Amy-Cathérine de Bary; Otto Hofer; Christine Stückelberger	1984 Los Angeles	Equestrian	Team dressage
Silver	Daniel Nipkov	1984 Los Angeles	Shooting	Men's 50m rifle 3 positions
Bronze	Otto Hofer	1984 Los Angeles	Equestrian	Individual dressage
Bronze	Heidi Robbiani	1984 Los Angeles	Equestrian	Individual jumping
Bronze	Étienne Dagon	1984 Los Angeles	Swimming	Men's 200m breaststroke
Bronze	Hugo Dietsche	1984 Los Angeles	Wrestling (Greco-Roman)	Men's featherweight
Silver	Otto Hofer; Daniel Ramseier; Samuel Schatzmann; Christine Stückelberger	1988 Seoul	Equestrian	Team dressage
Silver	Ueli Bodenmann; Beat Schwerzmann	1988 Seoul	Rowing	Men's double sculls
Bronze	Werner Günthör	1988 Seoul	Athletics	Men's shot put
Bronze	Christine Stückelberger	1988 Seoul	Equestrian	Individual dressage
Gold	Marc Rosset	1992 Barcelona	Tennis	Men's singles
Gold	Pascal Richard	1996 Atlanta	Cycling (Road)	Men's road race
Gold	Li Donghua	1996 Atlanta	Gymnastics (Artistic)	Men's pommel horse
Gold	Markus Gier; Michael Gier	1996 Atlanta	Rowing	Men's double sculls
Gold	Xeno Müller	1996 Atlanta	Rowing	Men's single sculls
Silver	Daniela Baumer; Sabine Eichenberger; Ingrid Haralamow; Gabi Müller	1996 Atlanta	Canoeing	Women's K-4 500m
Silver	Thomas Frischknecht	1996 Atlanta	Cycling (Mountain bike)	Men's cross-country
Silver	Wilhelm Melliger	1996 Atlanta	Equestrian	Individual jumping
Gold	Brigitte McMahon	2000 Sydney	Triathlon	Women's event
Silver	Barbara Blatter	2000 Sydney	Cycling (Mountain bike)	Women's cross-country
Silver	Markus Fuchs; Beat Maendli; Lesley McNaught; Wilhelm Melliger	2000 Sydney	Equestrian	Team jumping
Silver	Gianna Hablützel-Bürki	2000 Sydney	Fencing	Women's individual épée
Silver	Gianna Hablützel-Bürki; Sophie Lamon; Diana Romagnoli	2000 Sydney	Fencing	Women's team épée
Silver	Xeno Müller	2000 Sydney	Rowing	Men's single sculls
Silver	Michel Ansermet	2000 Sydney	Shooting	Men's 25m rapid fire pistol
Bronze	Christoph Sauser	2000 Sydney	Cycling (Mountain bike)	Men's cross-country
Bronze	Magali Messmer	2000 Sydney	Triathlon	Women's event
Gold	Marcel Fischer	2004 Athens	Fencing	Men's individual épée
Silver	Franco Marvulli; Bruno Risi	2004 Athens	Cycling (Track)	Men's madison
Bronze	Patrick Heuscher; Stefan Kobel	2004 Athens	Beach volleyball	Men's tournament
Bronze	Karin Thürig	2004 Athens	Cycling (Road)	Women's time trial
Bronze	Sven Riederer	2004 Athens	Triathlon	Men's event
Gold	Fabian Cancellara	2008 Beijing	Cycling (Road)	Men's time trial
Gold	Roger Federer; Stanislas Wawrinka	2008 Beijing	Tennis	Men's doubles
Silver	Fabian Cancellara	2008 Beijing	Cycling (Road)	Men's road race
Bronze	Nino Schurter	2008 Beijing	Cycling (Mountain bike)	Men's cross-country
Bronze	Karin Thürig	2008 Beijing	Cycling (Road)	Women's time trial
Bronze	Christina Liebherr; Pius Schwizer; Niklaus Schurtenberger; Steve Guerdat	2008 Beijing	Equestrian	Team jumping
Bronze	Sergei Aschwanden	2008 Beijing	Judo	Men's -90 kg class
Gold	Steve Guerdat	2012 London	Equestrian	Individual jumping
Gold	Nicola Spirig	2012 London	Triathlon	Women's event
Silver	Nino Schurter	2012 London	Cycling (Mountain bike)	Men's cross-country
Silver	Roger Federer	2012 London	Tennis	Men's singles
Gold	Nino Schurter	2016 Rio de Janeiro	Cycling (Mountain bike)	Men's cross-country
Gold	Fabian Cancellara	2016 Rio de Janeiro	Cycling (Road)	Men's time trial
Gold	Lucas Tramèr; Simon Schürch; Simon Niepmann; Mario Gyr	2016 Rio de Janeiro	Rowing	Men's lightweight coxless four
Silver	Martina Hingis; Timea Bacsinszky	2016 Rio de Janeiro	Tennis	Women's doubles
Silver	Nicola Spirig	2016 Rio de Janeiro	Triathlon	Women's event
Bronze	Giulia Steingruber	2016 Rio de Janeiro	Gymnastics (Artistic)	Women's vault
Bronze	Heidi Diethelm Gerber	2016 Rio de Janeiro	Shooting	Women's 25 m pistol
Gold	Jolanda Neff	2020 Tokyo	Cycling (Mountain bike)	Women's cross-country
Gold	Nina Christen	2020 Tokyo	Shooting	Women's 50 metre rifle three positions
Gold	Belinda Bencic	2020 Tokyo	Tennis	Women's singles
Silver	Sina Frei	2020 Tokyo	Cycling (Mountain bike)	Women's cross-country
Silver	Mathias Flückiger	2020 Tokyo	Cycling (Mountain bike)	Men's cross-country
Silver	Marlen Reusser	2020 Tokyo	Cycling (Road)	Women's road time trial
Silver	Belinda Bencic; Viktorija Golubic	2020 Tokyo	Tennis	Women's doubles
Bronze	Nina Christen	2020 Tokyo	Shooting	Women's 10 metre air rifle
Bronze	Linda Indergand	2020 Tokyo	Cycling (Mountain bike)	Women's cross-country
Bronze	Jérémy Desplanches	2020 Tokyo	Swimming	Men's 200 metre individual medley
Bronze	Noè Ponti	2020 Tokyo	Swimming	Men's 100 metre butterfly
Bronze	Nikita Ducarroz	2020 Tokyo	Cycling (BMX)	Women's BMX freestyle
Bronze	Anouk Vergé-Dépré; Joana Heidrich	2020 Tokyo	Beach volleyball	Women's tournament
Gold	Chiara Leone	2024 Paris	Shooting	Women's 50 metre rifle three positions
Silver	Julie Derron	2024 Paris	Triathlon	Women's
Silver	Steve Guerdat	2024 Paris	Equestrian	Individual jumping
Bronze	Audrey Gogniat	2024 Paris	Shooting	Women's 10 metre air rifle
Bronze	Roman Mityukov	2024 Paris	Swimming	Men's 200 metre backstroke
Bronze	Roman Röösli; Andrin Gulich	2024 Paris	Rowing	Men's coxless pair
Bronze	Zoé Claessens	2024 Paris	Cycling (BMX)	Women's BMX racing
Bronze	Tanja Hüberli; Nina Brunner	2024 Paris	Beach volleyball	Women's tournament

=== Winter Olympics ===
Medal	Name	Games	Sport	Event
Gold	Alfred Neveu; Eduard Scherrer; Alfred Schläppi; Heinrich Schläppi	1924 Chamonix	Bobsleigh	Four-man
Gold	Alfred Aufdenblatten; Alfons Julen; Anton Julen; Denis Vaucher	1924 Chamonix	Military patrol	Men's event
Bronze	Georges Gautschi	1924 Chamonix	Figure skating	Men's singles
Bronze	Ice hockey team: Giannin Andreossi Mezzi Andreossi Robert Breiter Louis Dufour Charles Fasel Albert Geromini Fritz Kraatz Arnold Martignoni Heini Meng Anton Morosani Luzius Rüedi Bibi Torriani	1928 St. Moritz	Ice hockey	Men's tournament
Silver	Reto Capadrutt; Oscar Geier	1932 Lake Placid	Bobsleigh	Two-man
Gold	Pierre Musy; Arnold Gartmann; Charles Bouvier; Joseph Beerli	1936 Garmisch-Partenkirchen	Bobsleigh	Four-man
Silver	Fritz Feierabend; Joseph Beerli	1936 Garmisch-Partenkirchen	Bobsleigh	Two-man
Silver	Reto Capadrutt; Hans Aichele; Fritz Feierabend; Hans Bütikofer	1936 Garmisch-Partenkirchen	Bobsleigh	Four-man
Gold	Edy Reinalter	1948 St. Moritz	Alpine skiing	Men's slalom
Gold	Hedy Schlunegger	1948 St. Moritz	Alpine skiing	Women's downhill
Gold	Felix Endrich; Fritz Waller	1948 St. Moritz	Bobsleigh	Two-man
Silver	Karl Molitor	1948 St. Moritz	Alpine skiing	Men's combined
Silver	Antoinette Meyer	1948 St. Moritz	Alpine skiing	Women's slalom
Silver	Fritz Feierabend; Paul Eberhard	1948 St. Moritz	Bobsleigh	Two-man
Silver	Hans Gerschwiler	1948 St. Moritz	Figure skating	Men's singles
Bronze	Karl Molitor	1948 St. Moritz	Alpine skiing	Men's downhill
Bronze	Rolf Olinger	1948 St. Moritz	Alpine skiing	Men's downhill
Bronze	Ice hockey team: Hans Bänninger Alfred Bieler Heinrich Boller Ferdinand Cattini Hans Cattini Hans Dürst Walter Dürst Emil Handschin Heini Lohrer Werner Lohrer Reto Perl Gebhard Poltera Ulrich Poltera Beat Rüedi Otto Schubiger Bibi Torriani Hans-Martin Trepp	1948 St. Moritz	Ice hockey	Men's tournament
Bronze	Fritz Feierabend; Stephan Waser	1952 Oslo	Bobsleigh	Two-man
Bronze	Fritz Feierabend; Albert Madörin; André Filippini; Stephan Waser	1952 Oslo	Bobsleigh	Four-man
Gold	Madeleine Berthod	1956 Cortina d'Ampezzo	Alpine skiing	Women's downhill
Gold	Renée Colliard	1956 Cortina d'Ampezzo	Alpine skiing	Women's downhill
Gold	Franz Kapus; Gottfried Diener; Robert Alt; Heinrich Angst	1956 Cortina d'Ampezzo	Bobsleigh	Four-man
Silver	Raymond Fellay	1956 Cortina d'Ampezzo	Alpine skiing	Men's downhill
Silver	Frieda Dänzer	1956 Cortina d'Ampezzo	Alpine skiing	Women's downhill
Bronze	Max Angst; Harry Warburton	1956 Cortina d'Ampezzo	Bobsleigh	Two-man
Gold	Roger Staub	1960 Squaw Valley	Alpine skiing	Men's giant slalom
Gold	Yvonne Rüegg	1960 Squaw Valley	Alpine skiing	Women's giant slalom
Silver	Willy Favre	1968 Grenoble	Alpine skiing	Men's giant slalom
Silver	Alois Kälin	1968 Grenoble	Nordic combined	Men's individual
Bronze	Jean-Daniel Dätwyler	1968 Grenoble	Alpine skiing	Men's downhill
Bronze	Fernande Bochatay	1968 Grenoble	Alpine skiing	Women's giant slalom
Bronze	Jean Wicki; Hans Candrian; Willi Hofmann; Walter Graf	1968 Grenoble	Bobsleigh	Four-man
Bronze	Josef Haas	1968 Grenoble	Cross-country skiing	Men's 50 km
Gold	Bernhard Russi	1972 Sapporo	Alpine skiing	Men's downhill
Gold	Marie-Theres Nadig	1972 Sapporo	Alpine skiing	Women's downhill
Gold	Marie-Theres Nadig	1972 Sapporo	Alpine skiing	Women's giant slalom
Gold	Jean Wicki; Hans Leutenegger; Werner Camichel; Edy Hubacher	1972 Sapporo	Bobsleigh	Four-man
Silver	Roland Collombin	1972 Sapporo	Alpine skiing	Men's downhill
Silver	Edmund Bruggmann	1972 Sapporo	Alpine skiing	Men's giant slalom
Silver	Walter Steiner	1972 Sapporo	Ski jumping	Large hill individual
Bronze	Werner Mattle	1972 Sapporo	Alpine skiing	Men's giant slalom
Bronze	Jean Wicki; Edy Hubacher	1972 Sapporo	Bobsleigh	Two-man
Bronze	Alfred Kälin; Albert Giger; Alois Kälin; Eduard Hauser	1972 Sapporo	Cross-country skiing	4 x 10 km relay
Gold	Heini Hemmi	1976 Innsbruck	Alpine skiing	Men's giant slalom
Silver	Bernhard Russi	1976 Innsbruck	Alpine skiing	Men's downhill
Silver	Ernst Good	1976 Innsbruck	Alpine skiing	Men's giant slalom
Silver	Erich Schärer; Ulrich Bächli; Rudolf Marti; Joseph Benz	1976 Innsbruck	Bobsleigh	Four-man
Bronze	Erich Schärer; Joseph Benz	1976 Innsbruck	Bobsleigh	Two-man
Gold	Erich Schärer; Joseph Benz	1980 Lake Placid	Bobsleigh	Two-man
Silver	Erich Schärer; Ulrich Bächli; Rudolf Marti; Joseph Benz	1980 Lake Placid	Bobsleigh	Four-man
Bronze	Jacques Lüthy	1980 Lake Placid	Alpine skiing	Men's slalom
Bronze	Marie-Theres Nadig	1980 Lake Placid	Alpine skiing	Women's downhill
Bronze	Erika Hess	1980 Lake Placid	Alpine skiing	Women's slalom
Gold	Max Julen	1984 Sarajevo	Alpine skiing	Men's giant slalom
Gold	Michela Figini	1984 Sarajevo	Alpine skiing	Women's downhill
Silver	Peter Müller	1984 Sarajevo	Alpine skiing	Men's downhill
Silver	Maria Walliser	1984 Sarajevo	Alpine skiing	Women's downhill
Bronze	Silvio Giobellina; Heinz Stettler; Urs Salzmann; Rico Freiermuth	1984 Sarajevo	Bobsleigh	Four-man
Gold	Pirmin Zurbriggen	1988 Calgary	Alpine skiing	Men's downhill
Gold	Vreni Schneider	1988 Calgary	Alpine skiing	Women's giant slalom
Gold	Vreni Schneider	1988 Calgary	Alpine skiing	Women's slalom
Gold	Ekkehard Fasser; Kurt Meier; Marcel Fässler; Werner Stocker	1988 Calgary	Bobsleigh	Four-man
Gold	Hippolyt Kempf	1988 Calgary	Nordic combined	Men's individual
Silver	Peter Müller	1988 Calgary	Alpine skiing	Men's downhill
Silver	Brigitte Oertli	1988 Calgary	Alpine skiing	Women's combined
Silver	Brigitte Oertli	1988 Calgary	Alpine skiing	Women's downhill
Silver	Michela Figini	1988 Calgary	Alpine skiing	Women's super-G
Silver	Andreas Schaad; Hippolyt Kempf; Fredy Glanzmann	1988 Calgary	Nordic combined	Men's team
Bronze	Paul Accola	1988 Calgary	Alpine skiing	Men's combined
Bronze	Pirmin Zurbriggen	1988 Calgary	Alpine skiing	Men's giant slalom
Bronze	Maria Walliser	1988 Calgary	Alpine skiing	Women's combined
Bronze	Maria Walliser	1988 Calgary	Alpine skiing	Women's giant slalom
Bronze	Andreas Grünenfelder	1988 Calgary	Cross-country skiing	Men's 50 km freestyle
Gold	Gustav Weder; Donat Acklin	1992 Albertville	Bobsleigh	Two-man
Bronze	Steve Locher	1992 Albertville	Alpine skiing	Men's combined
Bronze	Gustav Weder; Donat Acklin; Lorenz Schindelholz; Curdin Morell	1992 Albertville	Bobsleigh	Four-man
Gold	Vreni Schneider	1994 Lillehammer	Alpine skiing	Women's slalom
Gold	Gustav Weder; Donat Acklin	1994 Lillehammer	Bobsleigh	Two-man
Gold	Andreas Schönbächler	1994 Lillehammer	Freestyle skiing	Men's aerials
Silver	Urs Kälin	1994 Lillehammer	Alpine skiing	Men's giant slalom
Silver	Vreni Schneider	1994 Lillehammer	Alpine skiing	Women's combined
Silver	Reto Götschi; Guido Acklin	1994 Lillehammer	Bobsleigh	Two-man
Silver	Gustav Weder; Donat Acklin; Kurt Meier; Domenico Semeraro	1994 Lillehammer	Bobsleigh	Four-man
Bronze	Vreni Schneider	1994 Lillehammer	Alpine skiing	Women's giant slalom
Bronze	Jean-Yves Cuendet; Hippolyt Kempf; Andreas Schaad	1994 Lillehammer	Nordic combined	Men's team
Gold	Daniel Müller; Diego Perren; Dominic Andres; Patrick Hürlimann; Patrik Lörtscher	1998 Nagano	Curling	Men's tournament
Gold	Gian Simmen	1998 Nagano	Snowboarding	Men's halfpipe
Silver	Didier Cuche	1998 Nagano	Alpine skiing	Men's super-G
Silver	Marcel Rohner; Markus Nüssli; Markus Wasser; Beat Seitz	1998 Nagano	Bobsleigh	Four-man
Bronze	Michael von Grünigen	1998 Nagano	Alpine skiing	Men's giant slalom
Bronze	Colette Brand	1998 Nagano	Freestyle skiing	Women's aerials
Bronze	Ueli Kestenholz	1998 Nagano	Snowboarding	Men's giant slalom
Gold	Simon Ammann	2002 Salt Lake City	Ski jumping	Normal hill individual
Gold	Simon Ammann	2002 Salt Lake City	Ski jumping	Large hill individual
Gold	Philipp Schoch	2002 Salt Lake City	Snowboarding	Men's parallel giant slalom
Silver	Christian Reich; Steve Anderhub	2002 Salt Lake City	Bobsleigh	Two-man
Silver	Luzia Ebnöther; Mirjam Ott; Tanya Frei; Laurence Bidaud; Nadia Röthlisberger	2002 Salt Lake City	Curling	Women's tournament
Bronze	Sonja Nef	2002 Salt Lake City	Alpine skiing	Women's giant slalom
Bronze	Martin Annen; Beat Hefti	2002 Salt Lake City	Bobsleigh	Two-man
Bronze	Andrea Huber; Laurence Rochat; Brigitte Albrecht-Loretan; Natascia Leonardi Cortesi	2002 Salt Lake City	Cross-country skiing	Women's 4 x 5 km relay
Bronze	Andreas Schwaller; Christof Schwaller; Markus Eggler; Damian Grichting; Marco Ramstein	2002 Salt Lake City	Curling	Men's tournament
Bronze	Gregor Stähli	2002 Salt Lake City	Skeleton	Men's individual
Bronze	Fabienne Reuteler	2002 Salt Lake City	Snowboarding	Women's halfpipe
Gold	Evelyne Leu	2006 Turin	Freestyle skiing	Women's aerials
Gold	Maya Pedersen-Bieri	2006 Turin	Skeleton	Women's individual
Gold	Philipp Schoch	2006 Turin	Snowboarding	Men's parallel giant slalom
Gold	Daniela Meuli	2006 Turin	Snowboarding	Women's parallel giant slalom
Gold	Tanja Frieden	2006 Turin	Snowboarding	Women's snowboard cross
Silver	Martina Schild	2006 Turin	Alpine skiing	Women's downhill
Silver	Mirjam Ott; Binia Beeli; Valeria Spälty; Michèle Moser; Manuela Kormann	2006 Turin	Curling	Women's tournament
Silver	Stéphane Lambiel	2006 Turin	Figure skating	Men's singles
Silver	Simon Schoch	2006 Turin	Snowboarding	Men's parallel giant slalom
Bronze	Bruno Kernen	2006 Turin	Alpine skiing	Men's downhill
Bronze	Ambrosi Hoffmann	2006 Turin	Alpine skiing	Men's super-G
Bronze	Martin Annen; Beat Hefti	2006 Turin	Bobsleigh	Two-man
Bronze	Martin Annen; Beat Hefti; Cédric Grand; Thomas Lamparter	2006 Turin	Bobsleigh	Four-man
Bronze	Gregor Stähli	2006 Turin	Skeleton	Men's individual
Gold	Didier Défago	2010 Vancouver	Alpine skiing	Men's downhill
Gold	Carlo Janka	2010 Vancouver	Alpine skiing	Men's giant slalom
Gold	Dario Cologna	2010 Vancouver	Cross-country skiing	Men's 15 km freestyle
Gold	Michael Schmid	2010 Vancouver	Freestyle skiing	Men's ski cross
Gold	Simon Ammann	2010 Vancouver	Ski jumping	Normal hill individual
Gold	Simon Ammann	2010 Vancouver	Ski jumping	Large hill individual
Bronze	Silvan Zurbriggen	2010 Vancouver	Alpine skiing	Men's combined
Bronze	Ralph Stöckli; Jan Hauser; Markus Eggler; Simon Strübin; Toni Müller	2010 Vancouver	Curling	Men's tournament
Bronze	Olivia Nobs	2010 Vancouver	Snowboarding	Women's snowboard cross
Gold	Dominique Gisin	2014 Sochi	Alpine skiing	Women's downhill
Gold	Sandro Viletta	2014 Sochi	Alpine skiing	Men's combined
Gold	Dario Cologna	2014 Sochi	Cross-country skiing	Men's 15 km classical
Gold	Dario Cologna	2014 Sochi	Cross-country skiing	Men's 30 km skiathlon
Gold	Iouri Podladtchikov	2014 Sochi	Snowboarding	Men's halfpipe
Gold	Patrizia Kummer	2014 Sochi	Snowboarding	Women's parallel giant slalom
Gold	Alex Baumann; Beat Hefti	2014 Sochi	Bobsleigh	Two-man
Silver	Selina Gasparin	2014 Sochi	Biathlon	Women's individual
Silver	Nevin Galmarini	2014 Sochi	Snowboarding	Men's parallel giant slalom
Bronze	Lara Gut	2014 Sochi	Alpine skiing	Women's downhill
Bronze	Ice hockey team: Janine Alder Livia Altmann Sophie Anthamatten Laura Benz Sara Benz Nicole Bullo Romy Eggimann Sarah Forster Angela Frautschi Jessica Lutz Julia Marty Stefanie Marty Alina Müller Katrin Nabholz Evelina Raselli Florence Schelling Lara Stalder Phoebe Stanz Anja Stiefel Sandra Thalmann Nina Waidacher	2014 Sochi	Ice hockey	Women's tournament
Gold	Michelle Gisin	2018 Pyeongchang	Alpine skiing	Women's combined
Gold	Wendy Holdener; Denise Feierabend; Luca Aerni; Daniel Yule; Ramon Zenhäusern	2018 Pyeongchang	Alpine skiing	Mixed team
Gold	Dario Cologna	2018 Pyeongchang	Cross-country skiing	Men's 15 km freestyle
Gold	Sarah Höfflin	2018 Pyeongchang	Freestyle skiing	Women's slopestyle
Gold	Nevin Galmarini	2018 Pyeongchang	Snowboarding	Men's parallel giant slalom
Silver	Beat Feuz	2018 Pyeongchang	Alpine skiing	Men's super-G
Silver	Wendy Holdener	2018 Pyeongchang	Alpine skiing	Women's slalom
Silver	Ramon Zenhäusern	2018 Pyeongchang	Alpine skiing	Men's slalom
Silver	Jenny Perret; Martin Rios	2018 Pyeongchang	Curling	Mixed doubles
Silver	Mathilde Gremaud	2018 Pyeongchang	Freestyle skiing	Women's slopestyle
Silver	Marc Bischofberger	2018 Pyeongchang	Freestyle skiing	Men's ski cross
Bronze	Beat Feuz	2018 Pyeongchang	Alpine skiing	Men's downhill
Bronze	Wendy Holdener	2018 Pyeongchang	Alpine skiing	Women's combined
Bronze	Peter de Cruz; Valentin Tanner; Claudio Pätz; Benoît Schwarz; Dominik Märki	2018 Pyeongchang	Curling	Men's tournament
Bronze	Fanny Smith	2018 Pyeongchang	Freestyle skiing	Women's ski cross
Gold	Beat Feuz	2022 Beijing	Alpine skiing	Men's downhill
Gold	Marco Odermatt	2022 Beijing	Alpine skiing	Men's giant slalom
Gold	Michelle Gisin	2022 Beijing	Alpine skiing	Women's combined
Gold	Corinne Suter	2022 Beijing	Alpine skiing	Women's downhill
Gold	Lara Gut-Behrami	2022 Beijing	Alpine skiing	Women's super-G
Gold	Ryan Regez	2022 Beijing	Freestyle skiing	Men's ski cross
Gold	Mathilde Gremaud	2022 Beijing	Freestyle skiing	Women's slopestyle
Silver	Wendy Holdener	2022 Beijing	Alpine skiing	Women's combined
Silver	Alex Fiva	2022 Beijing	Freestyle skiing	Men's ski cross
Bronze	Lara Gut-Behrami	2022 Beijing	Alpine skiing	Women's giant slalom
Bronze	Wendy Holdener	2022 Beijing	Alpine skiing	Women's slalom
Bronze	Michelle Gisin	2022 Beijing	Alpine skiing	Women's super-G
Bronze	Mathilde Gremaud	2022 Beijing	Freestyle skiing	Women's big air
Bronze	Jan Scherrer	2022 Beijing	Snowboarding	Men's halfpipe
Bronze	Fanny Smith	2022 Beijing	Freestyle skiing	Women's ski cross
Gold	Franjo von Allmen	2026 Milano Cortina	Alpine skiing	Men's downhill
Gold	Franjo von Allmen; Tanguy Nef	2026 Milano Cortina	Alpine skiing	Men's team combined
Gold	Franjo von Allmen	2026 Milano Cortina	Alpine skiing	Men's super-G
Gold	Loïc Meillard	2026 Milano Cortina	Alpine skiing	Men's slalom
Gold	Mathilde Gremaud	2026 Milano Cortina	Freestyle skiing	Women's slopestyle
Gold	Marianne Fatton	2026 Milano Cortina	Ski mountaineering	Women's sprint
Silver	Marco Odermatt; Loïc Meillard	2026 Milano Cortina	Alpine skiing	Men's team combined
Silver	Marco Odermatt	2026 Milano Cortina	Alpine skiing	Men's giant slalom
Silver	Camille Rast	2026 Milano Cortina	Alpine skiing	Women's slalom
Silver	Nadja Kälin; Nadine Fähndrich	2026 Milano Cortina	Cross-country skiing	Women's team sprint
Silver	Silvana Tirinzoni; Selina Witschonke; Carole Howald; Alina Pätz; Stefanie Berset	2026 Milano Cortina	Curling	Women's tournament
Silver	Fanny Smith	2026 Milano Cortina	Freestyle skiing	Women's ski cross
Silver	Noé Roth	2026 Milano Cortina	Freestyle skiing	Men's aerials
Silver	Noé Roth; Lina Kozomara; Pirmin Werner	2026 Milano Cortina	Freestyle skiing	Mixed team aerials
Silver	Marianne Fatton; Jon Kistler	2026 Milano Cortina	Ski mountaineering	Mixed relay
Bronze	Marco Odermatt	2026 Milano Cortina	Alpine skiing	Men's super-G
Bronze	Loïc Meillard	2026 Milano Cortina	Alpine skiing	Men's giant slalom
Bronze	Michael Vogt; Andreas Haas; Amadou David Ndiaye; Mario Aeberhard	2026 Milano Cortina	Bobsleigh	Four-man
Bronze	Nadja Kälin	2026 Milano Cortina	Cross-country skiing	Women's 50 kilometre classical
Bronze	Yannick Schwaller; Pablo Lachat-Couchepin; Sven Michel; Benoît Schwarz-van Berkel; Kim Schwaller	2026 Milano Cortina	Curling	Men's tournament
Bronze	Alex Fiva	2026 Milano Cortina	Freestyle skiing	Men's ski cross
Bronze	Ice hockey team: Alessia Baechler Leoni Balzer Andrea Brändli Annic Büchi Lara Christen Rahel Enzler Naemi Herzig Sinja Leemann Lena Lutz Alina Marti Saskia Maurer Laure Mériguet Alina Müller Kaleigh Quennec Lisa Rüedi Vanessa Schaefer Shannon Sigrist Lara Stalder Nicole Vallario Monja Wagner Stefanie Wetli Ivana Wey Laura Zimmermann	2026 Milano Cortina	Ice hockey	Women's tournament
Bronze	Gregor Deschwanden	2026 Milano Cortina	Ski jumping	Men's normal hill individual

=== Reallocated medals of the 1900 and 1904 Summer Olympics ===
From the 1896 to 1904 Olympic Games, athletes were not always entered by nationality. While many competed under their National Olympic Committees (NOCs), others were entered by clubs, particularly in team events. In such cases, participation and medals could be attributed to the country of the club rather than the athlete's nationality. Consequently, the IOC has applied an inconsistent approach for attributing participation and medals from the 1896–1904 Olympic Games over time, alternating between the athlete's nationality and the national affiliation of the club they represented.

==== Medals reallocated from non-Swiss athletes to Swiss teams ====
Medal	Name	Nationality	Affiliation	Games	Sport	Event	Reallocated to	Ref
Silver	Pauline Whittier	United States	SUI; St. Moritz Golf Club	1900 Paris	Golf	Women's individual	Switzerland	

==== Medals reallocated from Swiss athletes to non-Swiss teams ====
Medal	Name	Games	Sport	Event	Reallocated to
Gold	Adolf Spinnler	1904 St. Louis	Gymnastics (Artistic)	Men's triathlon	Germany
Bronze	Adolf Spinnler	1904 St. Louis	Gymnastics (Artistic)	Men's individual all-around	Germany
Bronze	Gustav Thiefenthaler	1904 St. Louis	Wrestling	Men's freestyle light flyweight	United States

== Summary by sport ==
=== Gymnastics ===
Switzerland sent one gymnast to the first Games in 1896; Louis Zutter won the pommel horse and finished second in the vault and parallel bars.

Games	Cyclists	Events	Gold	Silver	Bronze	Total
1896 Athens	1	4/8	1	2	0	3
1900 Paris	3	1/1	0	0	0	0
Total			16	19	14	49

=== Fencing ===
Switzerland first competed in fencing at the 1900 Games, with 3 fencers (two men's foilists, one of whom also competed in the épée, and a men's sabreur); none advanced past the quarterfinals.

Games	Fencers	Events	Gold	Silver	Bronze	Total
1900 Paris	3	3/7	0	0	0	0
Total			1	4	3	8

=== Rowing ===
Games	No. Sailors	Events	Gold	Silver	Bronze	Total	Ranking
1896 Athens	Event wasn't held						
1900 Paris	0	0/5	0	0	0	0	
1904 St Louis	0	0/5	0	0	0	0	
1908 London	0	0/5	0	0	0	0	
1912 Stockholm	0	0/4	0	0	0	0	
1916	Games Cancelled						
1920 Antwerp	18	4/5	1	0	1	2	3
1924 Paris	29	7/7	2	0	3	5	2
1928 Amsterdam	13	5/7	1	1	0	2	3
1932 Los Angeles	0	0/7	0	0	0	0	
1936 Berlin	26	7/7	0	1	1	2	5
1940	Games Cancelled						
1944	Games Cancelled						
1948 London	19	5/7	0	2	0	2	6
1952 Helsinki	13	5/7	0	1	1	2	7=
1956 Melbourne	0	0/7	0	0	0	0	
1960 Rome	18	5/7	0	0	1	1	9=
1964 Tokyo	8	4/7	0	0	1	1	11
1968 Mexico City	18	6/7	0	0	1	1	11=
1972 Munich	17	6/7	0	1	0	1	6=
1976 Montreal	4	1/14	0	0	0	0	
1980	10	3/14	0	0	0	0	
1984 Los Angeles	9	3/14	0	0	0	0	
1988	7	2/14	0	1	0	1	11=
1992 Barcelona	9	4/14	0	0	0	0	
1996 Atlanta	11	4/14	2	0	0	2	3=
2000 Sydney	11	5/14	0	1	0	1	13=
2004 Athens	6	3/14	0	0	0	0	
2008 Beijing	1	1/14	0	0	0	0	
2012 London	8	2/14	0	0	0	0	
2016 Rio	11	4/14	1	0	0	1	10
2020 Tokyo	11	5/14	0	0	0	0	
2024 Paris	15	5/14	0	0	1	1	12=
Total	292	264	7	8	10	25	13

=== Sailing ===
Switzerland was one of the nations competing in the first Olympic sailing competitions in 1900. The Swiss team included the first female Olympian, who was also the first female Olympic medalist and first female Olympic champion; Hélène de Pourtalès won a gold medal and a silver medal as a member of the crew of the Lérina.

Games	No. Sailors	Events	Gold	Silver	Bronze	Total	Ranking
1896 Athens	Scheduled but event wasn't held						
1900 Paris	9	3/13	1	1	0	2	4
1916 St Louis	Not Scheduled						
1908 London	0	0/4	0	0	0	0	
1912 Stockholm	0	0/4	0	0	0	0	
1916	Games Cancelled						
1920 Antwerp	0	0/14	0	0	0	0	
1924 Paris	1	1/3	0	0	0	0	
1928 Amsterdam	1	1/3	0	0	0	0	
1932 Los Angeles	0	0/4	0	0	0	0	
1936 Berlin	6	2/4	0	0	0	0	
1940	Games Cancelled						
1944	Games Cancelled						
1948 London	13	3/5	0	0	0	0	
1952 Helsinki	11	4/5	0	0	0	0	
1956 Melbourne	0	0/5	0	0	0	0	
1960 Rome	11	5/5	0	0	1	1	8=
1964 Tokyo	7	3/5	0	0	0	0	
1968 Mexico City	9	4/5	0	1	0	1	5
1972 Munich	10	5/6	0	0	0	0	
1976 Montreal	6	3/6	0	0	0	0	
1980 Tallinn	9	4/6	0	0	0	0	
1984 Los Angeles	9	5/7	0	0	0	0	
1988 Busan	9	5/8	0	0	0	0	
1992 Barcelona	10	6/10	0	0	0	0	
1996 Atlanta	5	3/10	0	0	0	0	
2000 Sydney	8	5/11	0	0	0	0	
2004 Athens	8	5/11	0	0	0	0	
2008 Qingdoa	9	6/11	0	0	0	0	
2012 Weymouth	6	4/10	0	0	0	0	
2016 Rio	9	5/10	0	0	0	0	
2020 Tokyo	6	4/10	0	0	0	0	
2024 Paris	7	5/10	0	0	0	0	
Total	179	91 / 205	1	2	1	4	26

=== Shooting ===
Switzerland had one shooter in one event at the inaugural 1896 Games, placing eighth. In 1900, the Swiss dominated the shooting competitions and took 5 out of the 9 gold medals including both of the team championships.

Games	Shooters	Events	Gold	Silver	Bronze	Total
1896 Athens	1	1/5	0	0	0	0
1900 Paris	8	8/9	5	1	1	7
Total			6	6	9	21

== See also ==
- List of flag bearers for Switzerland at the Olympics
- Category:Olympic competitors for Switzerland
- Switzerland at the Paralympics
- Switzerland at the European Games
- European Youth Olympic Festival
- European Para Youth Games
