= IIHF All-Time Teams =

The IIHF All-Time Teams are the All-Time Teams of the countries that would have participated at the 2020 IIHF World Championship. To honor the 100-year anniversary of the Ice Hockey World Championships.

== List ==
Country	Goaltender	Right defenceman	Left defenceman	Right wing	Centre	Left wing	Honourable mentions
Belarus	Andrei Mezin	Ruslan Salei	Vladimir Kopat	Alexei Kalyuzhny	Vladimir Tsyplakov	Mikhail Grabovski	
Canada	Sean Burke	Scott Niedermayer	Chris Pronger	Wayne Gretzky	Mario Lemieux	Sidney Crosby	
Czech Republic / Czechoslovakia	Dominik Hašek	František Pospíšil	Tomáš Kaberle	Jaromír Jágr	Václav Nedomanský	Vladimír Martinec	
Denmark	Frederik Andersen	Jesper Damgaard	Daniel Nielsen	Frans Nielsen	Lars Eller	Morten Green	
Great Britain	Ben Bowns	Carl Erhardt	Ben O'Connor	Tony Hand	Kevin Conway	Robert Farmer	
Germany / West Germany	Olaf Kölzig	Uwe Krupp	Christian Ehrhoff	Erich Kühnhackl	Leon Draisaitl	Marco Sturm	
Finland	Pekka Rinne	Teppo Numminen	Kimmo Timonen	Jari Kurri	Teemu Selänne	Saku Koivu	
Italy	Mike Rosati	Robert Oberrauch	Armin Helfer	Lucio Topatigh	Mario Chitaroni	Roland Ramoser	
Kazakhstan	Vitali Yeremeyev	Evgeni Paladiev	Alexei Troschinsky	Talgat Zhailauov	Nik Antropov	Yevgeni Koreshkov	
Latvia / Soviet Union	Artūrs Irbe	Sandis Ozoliņš	Kārlis Skrastiņš	Helmuts Balderis	Sergejs Žoltoks	Oleg Znarok	
Norway	Lars Haugen	Jonas Holøs	Mats Trygg	Patrick Thoresen	Mathis Olimb	Mats Zuccarello	
Russia / Soviet Union	Vladislav Tretiak	Viacheslav Fetisov	Alexander Ragulin	Vsevolod Bobrov	Valeri Kharlamov	Evgeni Malkin	
Slovakia / Czechoslovakia	Vladimír Dzurilla	Ľubomír Višňovský	Zdeno Chára	Peter Šťastný	Miroslav Šatan	Žigmund Pálffy	
Sweden	Henrik Lundqvist	Börje Salming	Nicklas Lidström	Peter Forsberg	Mats Sundin	Sven Johansson	
Switzerland	Hans Bänninger	Mark Streit	Mathias Seger	Bibi Torriani	Hans-Martin Trepp	Ferdinand Cattini	17 players Reto Berra, David Aebischer, Martin Gerber, Albert Künzler, Roman Josi, Emil Handschin, Julien Vauclair, Severin Blindenbacher, Hans Cattini, Ulrich Poltera, Alfred Bieler, Ivo Rüthemann, Martin Plüss, Sandy Jeannin, Nico Hischier, Nino Niederreiter & Timo Meier
United States	Gerry Cosby	Chris Chelios	Ryan Suter	John Mayasich	Patrick Kane	Herb Drury	
