= Max Müller (disambiguation) =

(Friedrich) Max Müller (1823–1900) was a German and British philologist and orientalist.

Max Müller may also refer to:

- Max Müller (Danish army officer) (1808–1884), Danish officer who served in the First and Second Schleswig Wars
- Wilhelm Max Müller (1862–1919), American orientalist
- Max Ritter von Müller (1887–1918), German World War I fighter ace
- Max Müller (philosopher) (1906–1994), German philosopher and Catholic intellectual
- Max Müller (cross-country skier) (1916–2019), Swiss cross-country skier
- Max Müller (footballer) (born 1994), German footballer
