= Evgeni Malkin =

Russian ice hockey player (born 1986)

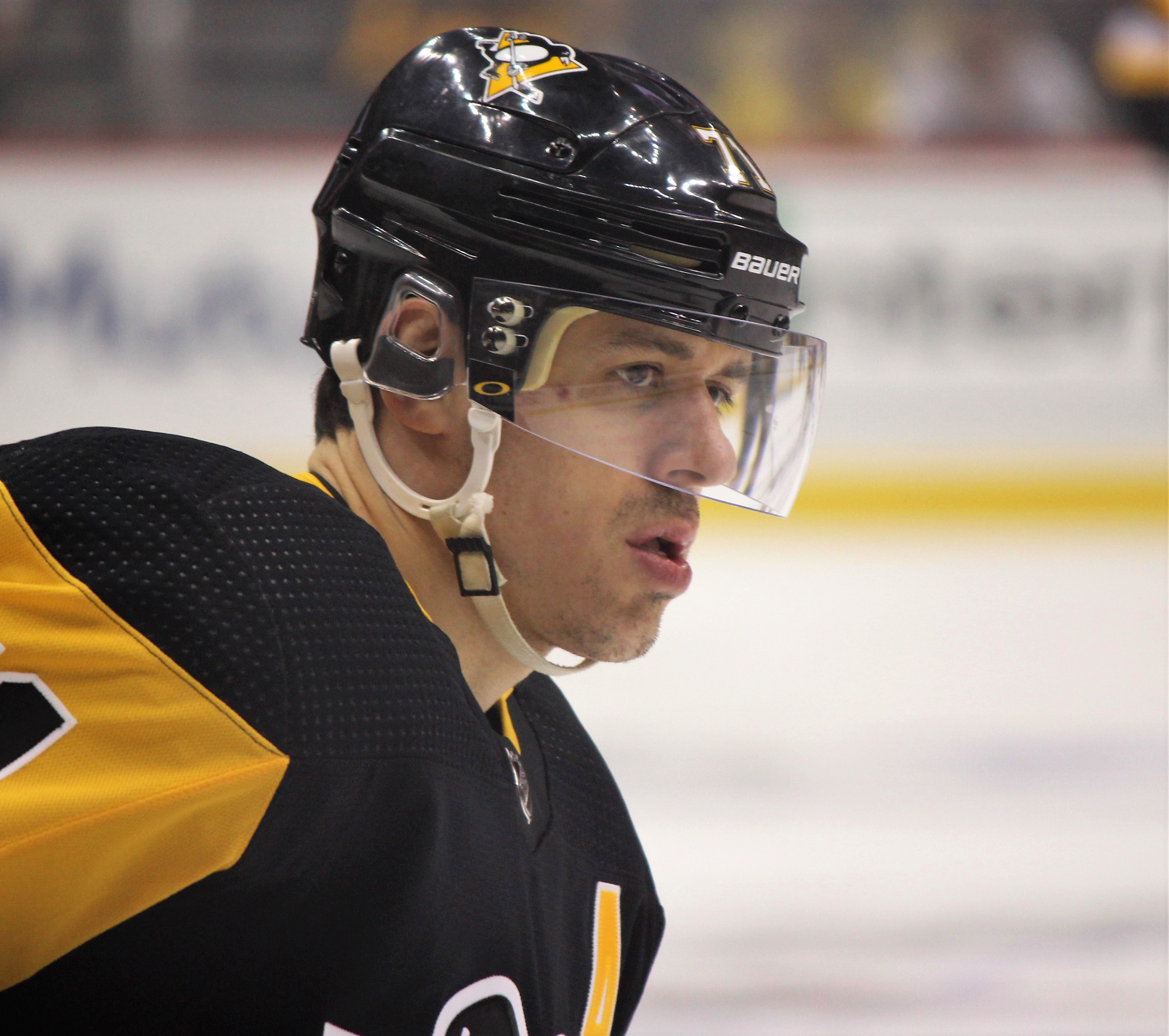
- Malkin with the Pittsburgh Penguins in 2019
- Born: 31 July 1986 (age 40) Magnitogorsk, Russian SFSR, Soviet Union
- Height: 6 ft 5 in (196 cm)
- Weight: 213 lb (97 kg; 15 st 3 lb)
- Position: Centre
- Shoots: Left
- NHL team Former teams: Pittsburgh Penguins; Metallurg Magnitogorsk
- National team: Russia
- NHL draft: 2nd overall, 2004; Pittsburgh Penguins
- Playing career: 2003–present

Evgeni Vladimirovich Malkin (Russian: Евге́ний Влади́мирович Ма́лкин, IPA: [jɪvˈɡʲenʲɪj ˈmalkʲɪn]; born 31 July 1986) is a Russian professional ice hockey player who is a centre and alternate captain for the Pittsburgh Penguins of the National Hockey League (NHL). Nicknamed "Geno", Malkin began his career with his hometown club Metallurg Magnitogorsk, playing for their junior and senior teams. He was then selected second overall in the 2004 NHL entry draft by the Pittsburgh Penguins, though an international transfer dispute delayed the start of his NHL career until 2006. Malkin is widely regarded as one of the greatest players of the modern NHL era and a quintessential piece of the Pittsburgh Penguins' salary cap era success.

After his first season with the Penguins, Malkin was awarded the Calder Memorial Trophy as the NHL's best rookie. In his second season, he helped lead Pittsburgh to the 2008 Stanley Cup Final and was a runner-up for the Hart Memorial Trophy, awarded to the NHL's most valuable player during the regular season. The following season saw Malkin win the Art Ross Trophy, awarded to the points leader in the NHL and again placed second for the Hart Trophy. He and the Penguins again reached the Stanley Cup Final, winning the Stanley Cup championship this time around. Malkin was awarded the Conn Smythe Trophy as most valuable player of the playoffs. In 2012, Malkin was awarded the Hart Trophy and Ted Lindsay Award, awarded to the best player as voted on by the players, after winning the Art Ross Trophy for the second time; his 12-point lead was the largest margin of victory since 1999.

Internationally, Malkin has competed for Russia in two IIHF World U18 Championships and three World Junior Championships, capturing one gold, two silvers and one bronze medal as a junior. In 2006, he was named tournament MVP. As a senior, he has played in four IIHF World Championships, winning gold twice and being named the tournament MVP for the 2012 event. Malkin has played for Russia in three Winter Olympic Games: Turin in 2006, Vancouver in 2010 and Sochi in 2014, respectively. In 2020, he was named to the IIHF All-Time Russia Team.

== Early life ==
Malkin was born on 31 July 1986, in Magnitogorsk to Vladimir and Natalia Malkin. Vladimir worked for Magnitogorsk Iron and Steel Works, the largest iron and steel works in Russia and the city's dominant industry, and played in the Metallurg Magnitogorsk youth and club hockey system. Malkin has one brother, Denis, who is older by one year. Malkin began skating at age three, and joined his first organized hockey league two years later, as he showed an aptitude for the sport at an early age.

== Playing career ==
=== Early career ===
Malkin is a product of the Metallurg Magnitogorsk hockey program. Prior to being drafted, he made his Russian Superleague debut in the 2003–04 season as a 17-year-old. He also made his international debut for Russia during the 2003 U-18 World Championships, where he skated on the top line with Alexander Ovechkin. The team went on to claim the bronze medal.

==== Transfer dispute ====
After his first professional season in Russia, Malkin was drafted second overall (behind national teammate Alexander Ovechkin) in the 2004 NHL entry draft by the Pittsburgh Penguins. However, a transfer dispute between the NHL and the International Ice Hockey Federation (IIHF) delayed his Pittsburgh debut; though he would have stayed in Russia for what would have been his rookie season with the Penguins in any event due to the 2004–05 NHL lockout. On 7 August 2006, it appeared the 20-year-old Malkin had come to a compromise with Metallurg and signed a deal that would have kept him in Russia until May 2007. However, Malkin stated he signed the one-year contract not as a compromise, but because of the immense "psychological pressure" his former club exerted on him. Desiring to play in the NHL, he left Metallurg Magnitogorsk's training camp in Helsinki before it began on 12 August. It would later appear the team had taken Malkin's passport away to prevent him from leaving, but it was eventually given back to him, and Malkin was allowed to pass through Finnish customs. Meeting with his agent, J. P. Barry, the two quickly departed and waited for Malkin's visa clearance from the U.S. Embassy.

In order to legally leave the team, on 15 August, Malkin invoked via fax a law allowing him to cancel his one-year contract by giving his employer two weeks' notice. Having untied himself of obligations in Russia, he was able to sign an entry-level contract with the Penguins on 5 September 2006.

Following his first NHL game with Pittsburgh, on 19 October 2006, Malkin's former Russian hockey club filed an antitrust lawsuit against the NHL and the Penguins in the United States District Court for the Southern District of New York. The lawsuit claimed Malkin should not be permitted to play in the NHL because he is still under contract in Russia. The claim also sought unspecified damages as well. The motion for an injunction was denied on 15 November 2006, ensuring Malkin would continue to play in the NHL that season. The lawsuit was ultimately dismissed on its merits by the District Court on 1 February 2007.

=== Pittsburgh Penguins (2006–present) ===
==== Calder Trophy, first Stanley Cup title and Conn Smythe Trophy (2006–2009) ====
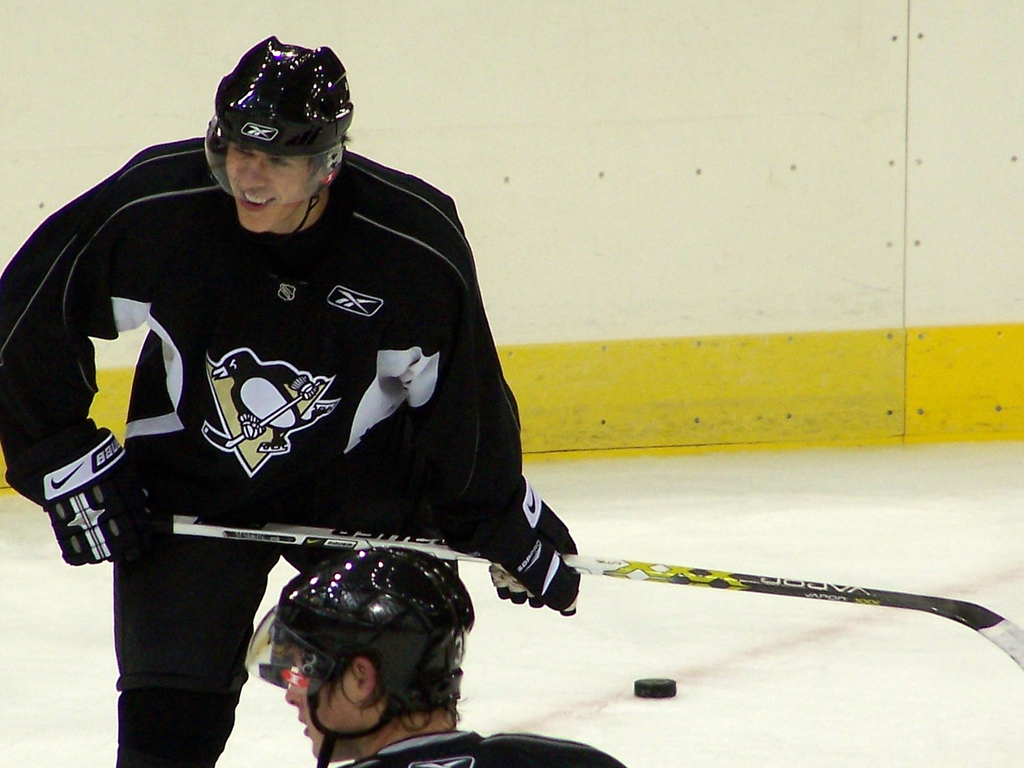
Malkin smiling during a practice with the Penguins in September 2006.

In his first pre-season game with the Penguins, on 20 September 2006, Malkin collided with teammate John LeClair and dislocated his own shoulder, which forced him to miss the start of the season. Subsequently, his NHL debut would be delayed until 18 October, against the New Jersey Devils, in which he scored his first goal against Martin Brodeur. Malkin set a modern NHL record when he scored a goal in each of his first six games. No player had achieved this feat since the NHL's inaugural 1917–18 season, when Montreal Canadiens forward Joe Malone scored at least one goal in 14 consecutive games to start his NHL career (Malone, however, had played in the National Hockey Association, the predecessor league to the NHL). Malkin's streak was eventually stopped on 4 November in his seventh game by the San Jose Sharks. Playing on a team with another highly touted prospect, sophomore forward and generational talent Sidney Crosby, Malkin finished his rookie season with 33 goals, 52 assists and 85 points in 78 games played, leading all first-year players and capturing the Calder Memorial Trophy as the NHL's top rookie, the second Penguin to win the award after Mario Lemieux in 1985. Malkin was named alternate captain for the Penguins shortly after. When Malkin arrived in the United States, he spoke little English, but with the help of fellow Russian teammate Sergei Gonchar, he eventually started to give short, simple interviews in the language.

Halfway into the 2007–08 season, his sophomore season in the NHL, Malkin recorded his first NHL hat-trick, against the Toronto Maple Leafs, on 3 January 2008. He earned another three-goal performance several games later, on 14 January, against the New York Rangers. Midway through the season, when more heralded teammate and captain Sidney Crosby went down with an ankle injury, Malkin seized the opportunity to lead the Penguins, scoring 44 points in the 28 games Crosby was absent. In total, Malkin completed the season second in NHL scoring with 106 points, six points behind Alexander Ovechkin of the Washington Capitals for the Art Ross Trophy. Malkin continued to dominate into the Stanley Cup playoffs as the Penguins made it to the 2008 Stanley Cup Final. He scored three points against the Presidents' Trophy-winning Detroit Red Wings in the finals, totalling 22 points overall (10 goals, 12 assists) in all 20 games, but the Penguins were defeated by Detroit in six games. Malkin's sophomore season culminated in a Hart Memorial Trophy nomination as NHL MVP—the award was given to Ovechkin—and First team All-Star honours.

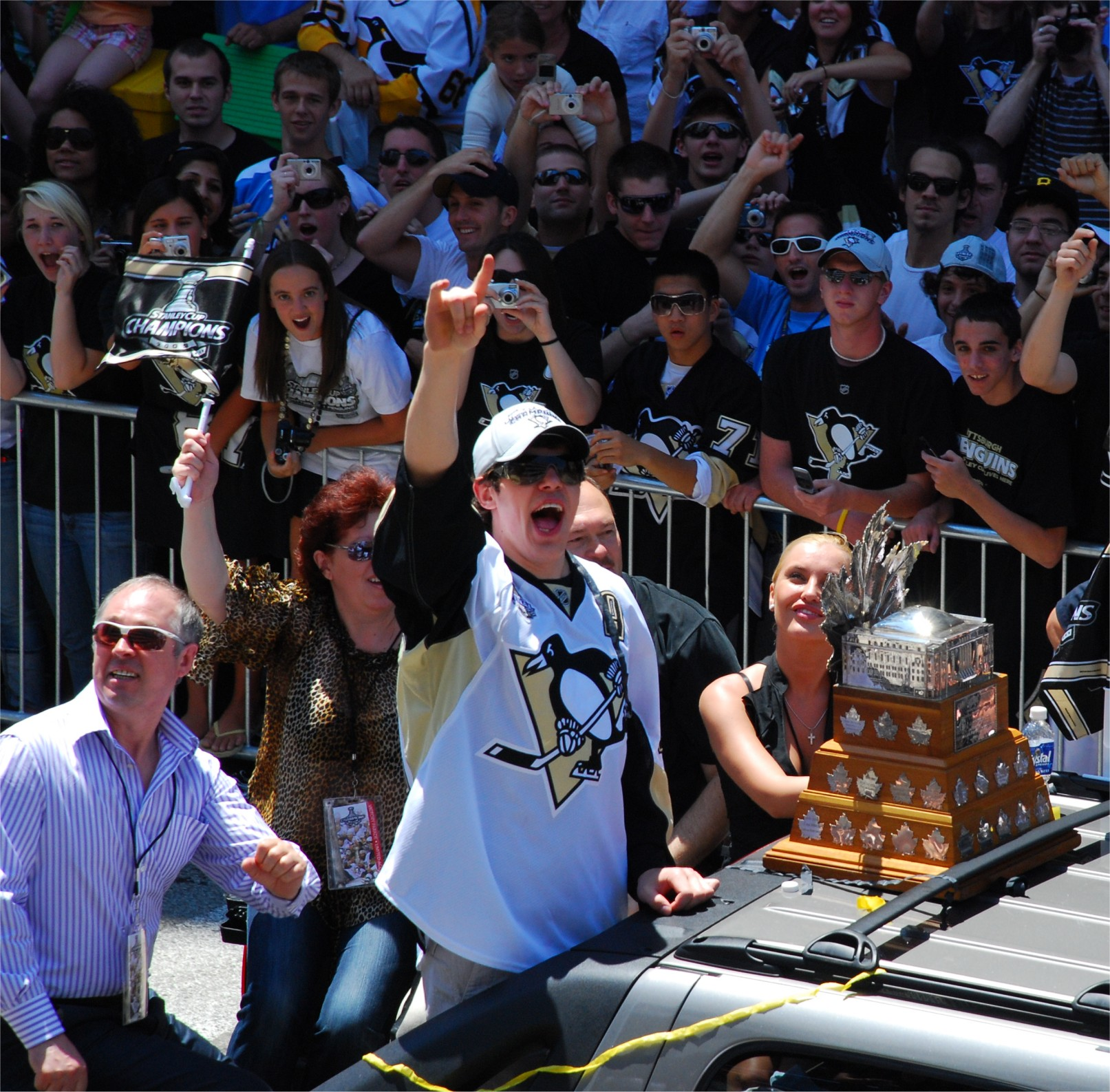
Malkin, along with his parents (left), during the Penguins' victory parade for their 2009 Stanley Cup victory.

On 2 July 2008, with one year left in his entry-level contract, he signed a five-year, $43.5 million contract extension with Pittsburgh. Malkin began the 2008–09 season by scoring his 200th NHL point with an assist to Sidney Crosby on 18 October 2008, in just the sixth game of the season against the Toronto Maple Leafs. The goal was also Crosby's 100th career goal and 300th career point. Crosby had a team trainer cut the puck in half so both players could commemorate the moment. Voted as a starter to the 2009 NHL All-Star Game later in the season, Malkin won the shooting accuracy segment of the Skills Competition, initially shooting four-for-four before beating Dany Heatley three-for-four in a tie-breaker. After having finished runner-up to Alexander Ovechkin the previous season for the Art Ross Trophy, Malkin captured the scoring championship with 113 points. He became the second Russian-born player to win it, after Ovechkin, and the fourth Penguin, after Mario Lemieux, Jaromír Jágr and Crosby. However, he would once again be runner-up to Ovechkin for the Hart Trophy, although this time garnering a few more first-place votes. In 2008, he had just one first-place vote (out of 134 votes) and 659 points to Ovechkin's 128 first-place votes and 1,313 points. In 2009, Malkin had 12 first-place votes (out of 133 votes) and 787 points to Ovechkin's 115 first-place votes and 1,264 points. On 12 June 2009, the Penguins won the Stanley Cup after defeating the Detroit Red Wings 2–1 in game seven of the Final. Malkin tallied 36 points (14 goals and 22 assists) to become the first player to lead both the regular season and playoffs in scoring since Mario Lemieux accomplished the feat in 1992. His 36 points were the highest playoff total of any player since Wayne Gretzky amassed 40 points in 1993. Malkin received the Conn Smythe Trophy as playoff MVP, becoming the first Russian-born player to do so. He is also just the second player in franchise history to win both the Art Ross and Conn Smythe trophies in the same year. The other Penguin to accomplish this feat was Hockey Hall of Famer and team co-owner/president Mario Lemieux (1992).

==== Hart Trophy, playoff shortcomings (2009–2015) ====
On 28 October 2009, Malkin suffered a strained shoulder in a 6–1 win over the Montreal Canadiens, resulting in him missing the next seven games. On 21 March 2010, Malkin would suffer a bruised foot as a result of a fall he took near the boards in a 3–2 overtime loss to the Carolina Hurricanes, sidelining him for seven more games. Malkin played 67 games in the 2009–10 season and recorded 28 goals, 49 assists and 77 points. Malkin and the Penguins came into the 2010 playoffs as the defending Stanley Cup champions and fourth seed in the Eastern Conference and defeated the fifth-seeded Ottawa Senators in six games in the first round but then were upset by the eighth-seeded Montreal Canadiens in seven games in the second round, squandering a 3–2 series lead along the way.

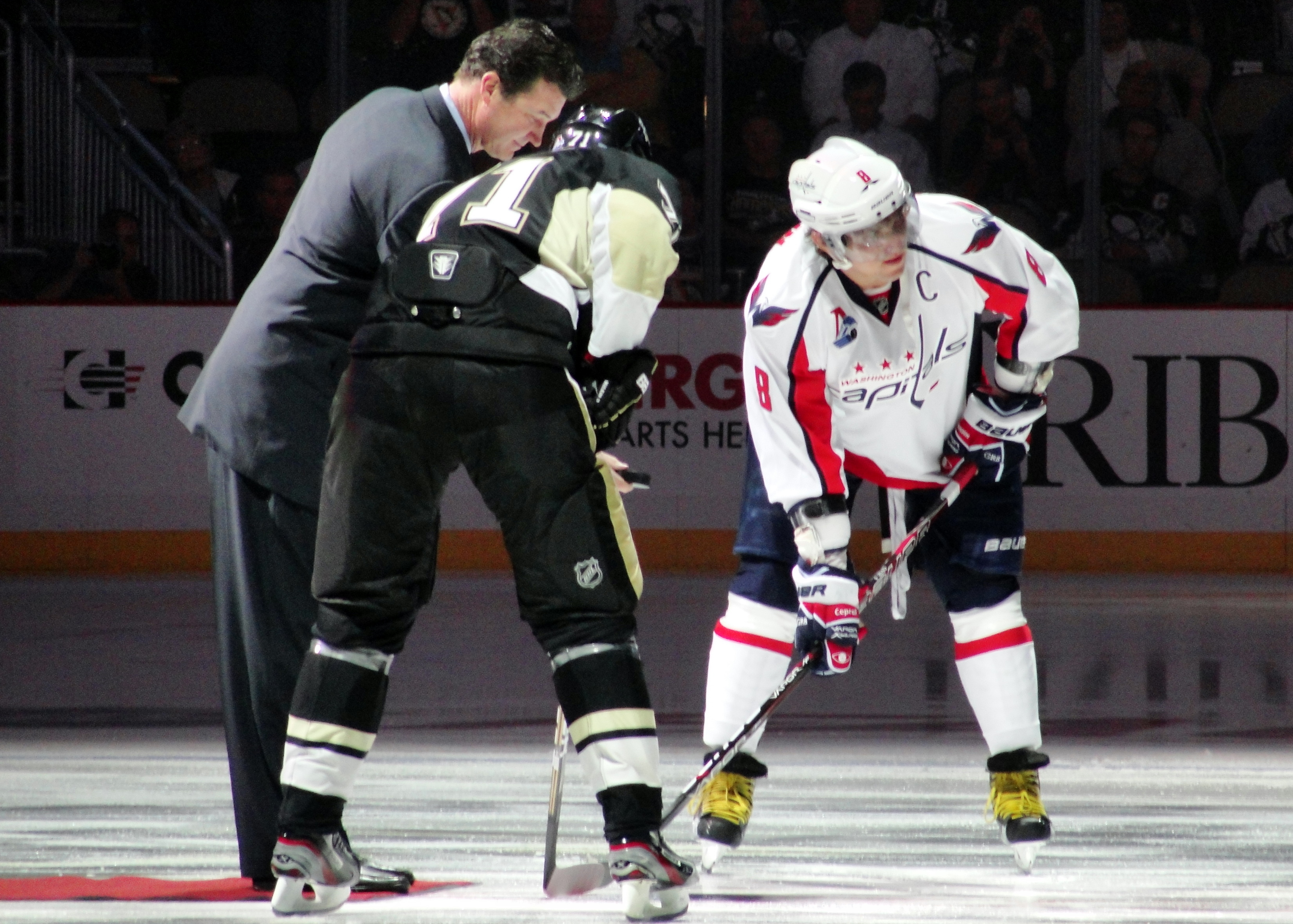
Malkin (foreground) and Alexander Ovechkin participating in a ceremonial puck drop with Mario Lemieux before an October 2011 game, to honour the victims of the 2011 Lokomotiv Yaroslavl plane crash.

On 4 February 2011, after missing five games due to a left knee injury and sinus infection, Malkin returned to play against the Buffalo Sabres. At the start of the second period, Sabres defenceman Tyler Myers collided with Malkin against the end boards, injuring his right knee. He was helped off the ice and went straight to the dressing room, unable to return to the game as he suffered both a torn anterior cruciate ligament (ACL) and medial collateral ligament (MCL). On 9 February, it was announced that Malkin would undergo knee surgery. The Penguins estimated his recovery period as six months, sidelining him for the remainder of the 2010–11 season and playoffs, but stated he should be ready for training camp in mid-September. According to then Penguins' general manager Ray Shero, Malkin sent him a text message after the incident occurred stating, "I'm sorry." In Shero's words, "I told him he had nothing to apologize for." In Malkin's absence, the Penguins as a team would end the season as the fourth seed in the Eastern Conference for the third straight season but their fortunes would change in the opening round of the 2011 playoffs against the Tampa Bay Lightning as the Penguins would lose in seven games to the fifth-seeded Lightning, despite initially having a 3–1 series lead earlier in the series.

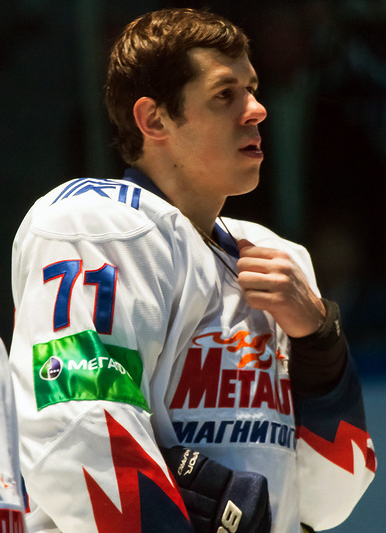
Malkin in October 2012. He played with Metallurg Magnitogorsk of the Kontinental Hockey League (KHL) during the 2012–13 NHL lockout.

Malkin had a bounce-back season in 2011–12. With post-concussion syndrome limiting team captain Sidney Crosby to 22 games, Malkin led the Penguins on a line with newly acquired winger James Neal. Despite missing seven games due to lingering effects of his knee surgery the previous season, Malkin scored 50 goals for the first time in his career, including three hat-tricks, 59 assists and won his second scoring title with 109 points in the 75 games he did play to collect his second career Art Ross Trophy. He was the only player in the NHL during the 2011–12 season to score at least 100 points. Malkin would go on to win the Hart Trophy as the NHL's MVP for his performance in the season beating out Tampa Bay Lightning forward Steven Stamkos and New York Rangers goaltender Henrik Lundqvist, respectively. He also went on to win the Ted Lindsay Award for the most outstanding player judged by the NHL Players' Association, beating out finalists Stamkos and Lundqvist for this award as well. He also became the first player in the past ten NHL seasons to win two scoring titles, putting an end to a streak of nine different players over nine seasons leading the NHL in points. Malkin's 50 goals also resulted in him being the runner-up to the Rocket Richard Trophy, only behind the 60 goals scored by Steven Stamkos. Despite Malkin's impressive season and the Penguins clinching the fourth-seed in the East for the fourth straight season, the Penguins were eliminated in the first round of the 2012 playoffs by the in-state rival and fifth-seeded Philadelphia Flyers in six games. Malkin scored eight points (three goals, five assists) in all six games. Following the Penguins' early playoff exit, it was announced Malkin would again represent Russia at the 2012 World Championships.

With the start of the 2012–13 NHL season delayed due to the lockout, Malkin went to Russia and played for Magnitogorsk, his former team, who had joined the Kontinental Hockey League (KHL) since he last played there. By the time the lockout ended in early-January 2013, Malkin was second in KHL scoring with 23 goals and 42 assists for 65 points in 37 games. Though he missed the final part of the KHL season, he still finished third overall in scoring. A concussion suffered on 22 February 2013, in a 3–1 win over the Florida Panthers after getting hit by Panthers defenceman Erik Gudbranson and a shoulder injury on 10 March in a 5–4 shootout win over the Toronto Maple Leafs caused by a hit by opposing forward James van Riemsdyk limited Malkin to 31 games during the season, rather than the 48 scheduled, in which he scored 33 points (nine goals, 24 assists). In the 2013 playoffs, Malkin and the Penguins faced the eighth-seeded New York Islanders in the first round, eliminating them in six games. Malkin had an excellent series, recording two goals, nine assists and 11 points in the six games. In the next round, the Penguins defeated the seventh-seeded Ottawa Senators in five games, with Malkin scoring two more goals and five points to clinch a third round appearance for the first time since the Penguins 2009 Stanley Cup run. The Penguins were then swept in the Eastern Conference Finals against the fourth-seeded Boston Bruins. The entire Penguins team was kept to two goals in the four-game series against the Bruins, with Malkin held off the scoresheet and posting a −5 plus-minus rating.

In the 2013–14 season, Malkin was held out of 22 games, missing two games with a lower body injury against the San Jose Sharks on 5 December 2013, nine games with another lower-body injury against the Detroit Red Wings on 14 December, and then 11 games with a foot injury against the Phoenix Coyotes on 25 March 2014. In the 60 games he was healthy, Malkin scored 23 goals, 49 assists and 72 points, second on the Penguins behind only Sidney Crosby. In his second-to-last game of the season three days earlier, against the Tampa Bay Lightning, Malkin had two goals and two assists for four points. In the 2014 playoffs, the Penguins met the Columbus Blue Jackets in the first round, eliminating them in six games. Malkin was unable to score for Pittsburgh in the first five games and only managed four assists in that time, causing Penguins fans to worry, especially since Crosby was being held off the scoresheet as well. But Malkin broke through with a hat-trick in game six, propelling his team to Round 2. In Round 2 against the fifth-seeded New York Rangers, Malkin and the Penguins were eliminated in seven games, despite initially holding a 3–1 lead in the series. The Penguins only managed three goals in the last three games. Malkin had a solid series, scoring three goals and seven points in seven games, leading the Penguins.

On 30 October 2014, Malkin recorded his 400th assist on a Chris Kunitz goal in a 3–0 victory over the Los Angeles Kings to become the fifth player in franchise history to reach the mark. On 22 April 2015, in the fourth game in the first round of the 2015 playoffs against the Presidents' Trophy-winning New York Rangers, Malkin played his 100th career playoff game becoming the fifth player in Penguins history to do so. The Penguins would eventually fall to the Rangers in five games.

==== Back-to-back Stanley Cup championships, continued success (2015–2024) ====
Malkin had an injury-depleted 2015–16 campaign. On 4 February 2016, Malkin sustained an undisclosed lower-body injury in a 6–5 win against the Ottawa Senators, resulting in him missing the next 10 games. On 11 March, in a 3–2 win over the Columbus Blue Jackets, Malkin suffered what was believed to be an undisclosed upper-body injury after colliding with Columbus’ defenceman Dalton Prout. This injury resulted in Malkin missing the remainder of the season and the first game in the first round of the 2016 playoffs against the New York Rangers. He finished the season playing in 57 games with 27 goals and 31 assists for 58 points. After playing against the Rangers in the opening round for a second consecutive year and third consecutive year altogether and this time defeating them in five games, the Penguins would defeat the Presidents' Trophy-winning Washington Capitals in six games in the second round and the Tampa Bay Lightning in the third round in seven games before defeating the San Jose Sharks in six games in the 2016 Stanley Cup Final, as the Penguins clinched the Stanley Cup for the first time since 2009. He ended the run with six goals and 12 assists for 18 points in 23 games.

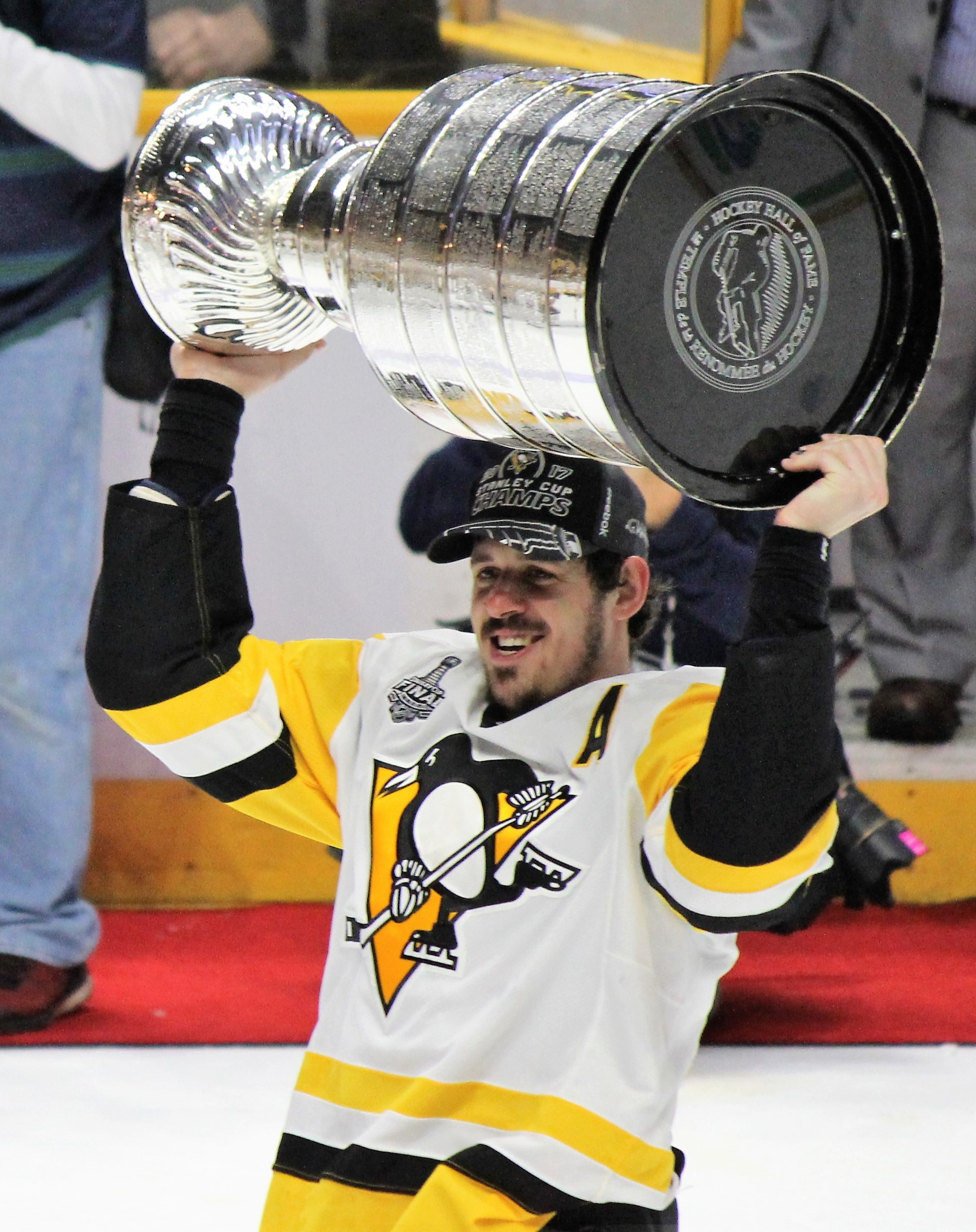
Malkin with the Stanley Cup following game six of the 2017 Stanley Cup Final in Nashville. It was the second consecutive championship and third overall of Malkin's career.

On 29 October 2016, Malkin recorded his 300th career NHL goal in a 5–4 win over the Philadelphia Flyers. On 17 February 2017, Malkin recorded his 500th career assist on a goal by Ian Cole in a 2–1 overtime loss to the Columbus Blue Jackets. He ended the 2016–17 season with 33 goals and 39 assists for 72 points in 62 games. He became the 29th player in the history of the NHL to record 150 points in the playoffs after recording three assists in a 7–0 win in game five of the Eastern Conference Finals against the Ottawa Senators on goals by Sidney Crosby, Phil Kessel and Trevor Daley, respectively. He ended the 2017 playoffs by leading the team and league with 28 points (10 goals, 18 assists) in all 25 playoff games as the Penguins would repeat as Stanley Cup champions.

Malkin enjoyed a healthy and productive 2017–18 season as he would finish the season with 98 points (42 goals, 56 assists) in 78 games. On 15 April 2018, in game three of the opening round of the 2018 playoffs, Malkin recorded his 100th career playoff assist on a Justin Schultz goal in a 5–1 win over the in-state rival Philadelphia Flyers. After eventually defeating the Flyers in six games, the Penguins would face the Washington Capitals in the second round for the third consecutive year where Malkin and the Penguins would fall in six games to the eventual Stanley Cup champion and second-seeded Capitals.

On 30 January 2019, Malkin suffered a suspected hand injury in a 4–2 win over the Tampa Bay Lightning after he was hit by Lightning’ defenceman Daniel Girardi. Despite this, he was able to finish the game recording two assists on goals by Phil Kessel and Kris Letang while also getting into a fight with Lightning forward and captain Steven Stamkos, which was later believed to have aggravated the injury. After missing the next four games and returning to the lineup on 11 February, in a 4–1 win over the Philadelphia Flyers, Malkin was the subject of a high-sticking call after swinging his stick into the face of Flyers’ forward Michael Raffl, resulting in a one game suspension. On 12 March, Malkin recorded his 1,000th NHL point on a Phil Kessel goal against the Washington Capitals, becoming the 88th player in league history to reach the mark. Malkin would finish the 2018–19 season with 21 goals and 51 assists for 72 points in 68 games as the Penguins as a team finished as the fifth seed in the East. In the 2019 playoffs, Malkin recorded a goal and two assists for three points in all four games against the New York Islanders as the Penguins would get swept in the first round by the fourth-seeded Islanders.

On 16 March 2021, Malkin suffered a minor knee injury in a 2–1 loss over the Boston Bruins after he collided with Bruins' defenceman Jarred Tinordi, resulting in him missing the next 23 games until recovering to play the final four games of the season. He would end the pandemic-shortened 2020–21 season with eight goals and 20 assists for 28 points in 33 games. He re-aggravated the injury in the season finale on 8 May in the Penguins 1–0 win over the Buffalo Sabres, causing him to miss the first two games in the opening round of the 2021 playoffs against the New York Islanders. Malkin returned to the lineup for game three but the Penguins would eventually get defeated by the Islanders in six games, marking the second time in three seasons where the Islanders defeated Malkin and the Penguins in the first round of the playoffs. Malkin finished the playoffs with a goal and four assists for five points in four games.

Malkin underwent knee surgery in the 2021 off-season, resulting in him missing the first 32 games of the 2021–22 season before making his season debut on 11 January 2022, in a 4–1 win against the Anaheim Ducks and recording two goals along with an assist on a Jeff Carter goal. On 11 April, Malkin was handed a four game suspension after he cross-checked Nashville Predators defenceman Mark Borowiecki the previous day and bloodying him. He would go on to finish the season with 20 goals and 22 assists for 42 points in 41 games played while the Penguins as a team finished as the sixth seed in the East. Malkin followed up in the 2022 playoffs with three goals and three assists for six points in all seven games as the Penguins would lose in round one once more as they were defeated in seven games by the New York Rangers and surrendering a 3–1 series lead in the series against the third-seeded Rangers in the process.

On 12 July 2022, after initial reports that he would be heading to free agency, Malkin signed a four-year, $24.4 million contract extension to stay with the Penguins. He played his 1,000th NHL game on 23 November against the Chicago Blackhawks, joining Sidney Crosby as the only players to play all 1,000 games with the Penguins. Malkin finished the 2022–23 season playing in all 82 games with 83 points recorded (27 goals, 56 assists) and the Penguins missed the playoffs for the first time since 2006 and it would be the first time in Malkin's career that he missed the playoffs.

Malkin recorded 27 goals, 40 assists and 67 points in all 82 contests played in the 2023–24 season as the Penguins missed the playoffs for the second consecutive season.

==== Recent years (2024–present) ====
The beginning of the 2024–25 season was filled with milestones for Malkin. On 10 October 2024, Malkin recorded his 800th career assist on a goal by Erik Karlsson in a 6–3 win over the Detroit Red Wings, becoming the 34th player in league history to reach the mark. Two days later, in a 4–2 loss to the Toronto Maple Leafs, Malkin recorded his 1,300th NHL point with an assist on a goal by Rickard Rakell, becoming the 37th player in league history to reach the mark. On 16 October, Malkin scored his 500th career goal in a 6–5 overtime win over the Buffalo Sabres, scoring the goal on Sabres' goaltender Ukko-Pekka Luukkonen to become the 48th player in league history to reach the mark and 24th player to do so with one franchise. He ended the season with 16 goals and 34 assists for 50 points in 68 games as the Penguins missed the playoffs once more.

Prior to the 2025–26 season, Malkin expressed his desire to continue playing with the Penguins, with his agent and team general manager Kyle Dubas agreeing to put off contract talks until after the season. On March 6, 2026, Malkin was suspended for five games for slashing Buffalo Sabres defenseman Rasmus Dahlin on a game the previous day, during which Malkin was assessed two penalties and a game misconduct, ejecting him from the contest. Malkin finished the 2025–26 season, with 61 points, 19 goals and 42 assists, in 56 regular-season games as the Penguins qualified for the playoffs for the first time since 2022. In the Penguins first round exit in six games in the 2026 playoffs against the Philadelphia Flyers, Malkin scored two goals and an assist in six games.

On May 26, 2026, Malkin signed a 1-year, $5.5 million extension with the Penguins, keeping him with the club through the 2026–27 NHL season.

== International play ==
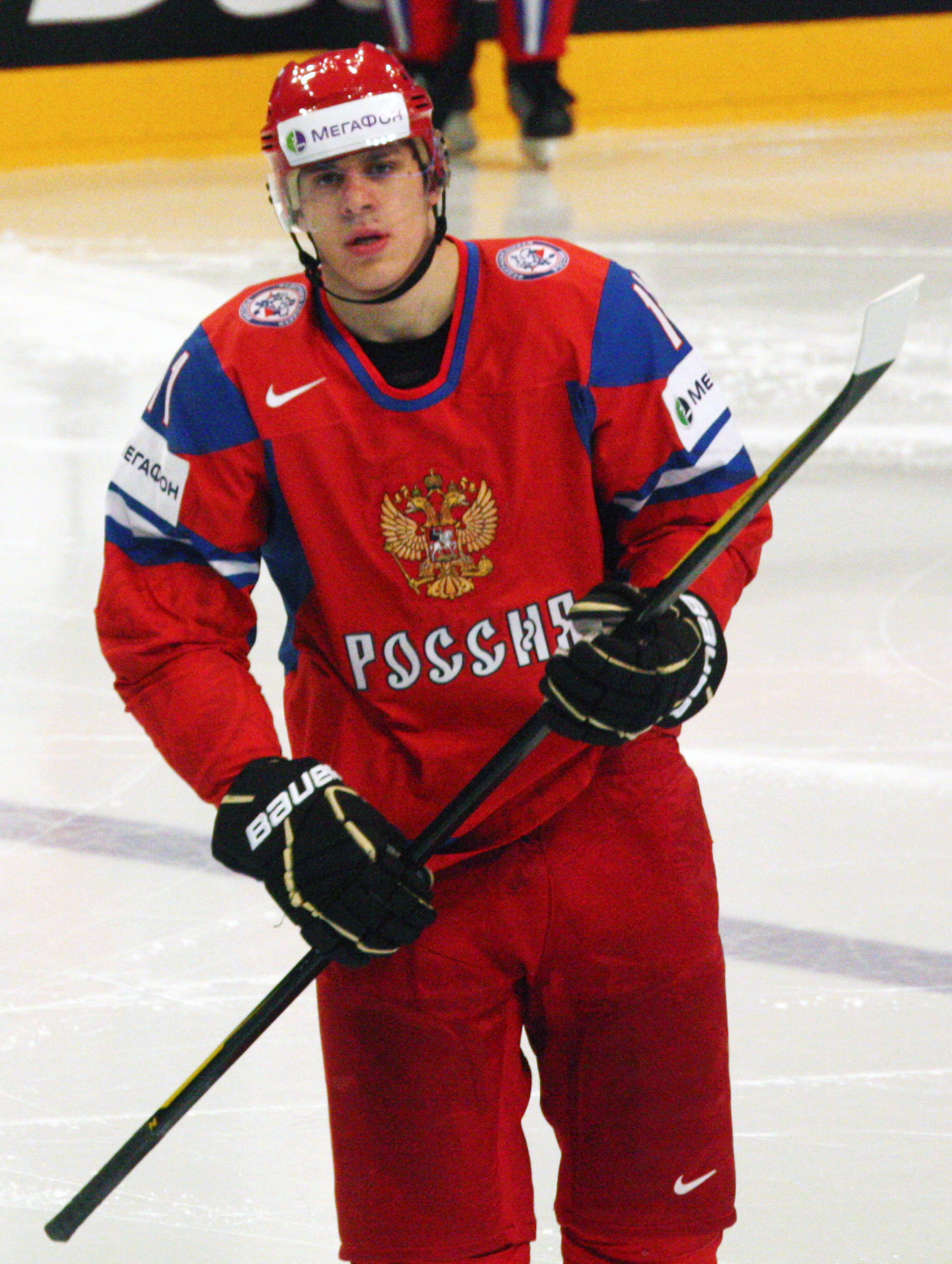
- Malkin during the 2012 World Championships

Medal record

Men's ice hockey

Representing Russia

World Championships
Gold medal – first place	2012 Finland/Sweden	
Gold medal – first place	2014 Belarus	
Silver medal – second place	2010 Germany	
Silver medal – second place	2015 Czech Republic	
Bronze medal – third place	2005 Austria	
Bronze medal – third place	2007 Russia	
Bronze medal – third place	2019 Slovakia	

World Junior Championships
Silver medal – second place	2005 United States	
Silver medal – second place	2006 Canada	

World U18 Championships
Gold medal – first place	2004 Belarus	
Bronze medal – third place	2003 Russia	

Malkin made his first international appearance with Russia at the 2003 IIHF World U18 Championships in Yaroslavl. He helped Russia to a bronze medal, scoring nine points in six games. He was named Russia's U18 captain for the 2004 IIHF World U18 Championships the following year and scored eight points as Russia improved to a gold medal in the tournament.

Several months prior to his second and final U18 tournament, Malkin debuted at the under-20 level with Russia at the 2004 World Junior Championships. In his first of three tournament appearances, he contributed five points in six games but could not help Russia reach the podium. The following year, Malkin finished second in team scoring at the 2005 World Junior Championships to Alexander Ovechkin with ten points. Led by the duo of Malkin and Ovechkin (the two had also played together the previous year), Russia won the silver, losing to Canada in the gold medal game. Later in 2005, Malkin made his debut with the Russian men's team at the 2005 World Championships. Despite failing to score a goal in the tournament, Malkin contributed four assists to help Russia to a bronze medal in Vienna.

In 2006, Malkin did triple duty for Russia, competing in his third World Junior Championships, his first Winter Olympics and his second World Championships. He was named the top forward and MVP of the 2006 World Junior Championships in January, captaining Russia to a second straight silver medal and gold medal game loss to Canada. Less than two months later, Malkin was given one of the final spots on Team Russia for the 2006 Winter Olympics in Turin, where he helped the team to a fourth-place finish with six points in seven games. Then in May, Malkin played in the 2006 World Championship, where he led Russia in team scoring with nine points.

Following his NHL rookie campaign with the Pittsburgh Penguins, Malkin was named to the Russian squad for the 2007 World Championships, where he achieved a personal best for the tournament of ten points. Malkin played in the first line of Team Russia together with Ilya Kovalchuk and Alexander Frolov. Malkin scored Russia's only goal in a 2-1 loss to Finland in the semifinals, with Russia going on to claim the bronze medal in the third place game.

2010 was an impressive year for Malkin internationally. Malkin was selected to play for the Russian Olympic Team at the 2010 Vancouver Olympic Games, where he led all players at the Olympic tournament in points-per-game average with 1.50 points per game, and led Team Russia in points yet again with three goals and six points in four games. Russia ultimately lost to Canada in the quarter-finals, finishing sixth overall. Malkin then joined the Russian team for the 2010 IIHF World Championship. Despite joining the tournament partway through, as his NHL team was not eliminated until the second round of the Stanley Cup playoffs, Malkin scored at a goal-per-game pace and ended up with the distinction of being the player with the fewest games played who made the post-tournament IIHF World Championship All-star team. His 5 goals and 2 assists in 5 games secured him a place in the tournament's top 10 point scorers, and he was the only player among the top 10 scorers who played less than 6 games. He captured his first World Championships silver medal.

Malkin was named MVP, the best forward and to the All-Star team at the 2012 IIHF World Championship, where he scored 11 goals and made 8 assists, winning the scoring league with a total of 19 points. He recorded at least one point in every game played. He also had two hat-tricks, against Sweden in the preliminary round and against Finland in the semi-final. Russia won the gold medal. The 19 points is a new record for Russian players on World Championships.

In 2014, Malkin was named to the 2014 Russian Olympic Ice Hockey Team. He played all five games for Russia as they finished fifth in the tournament after losing to Finland in the quarter-finals. Malkin had one goal and two assists by the end of the tournament.

In 2019, Malkin played in the 2019 IIHF World Championship, where he recorded the primary assist on Russia's game-winning goal against Team USA in the knockout stage. Russia would lose their next game to Finland in the semifinal, and settle for a bronze medal.

In 2020, Malkin was named to the IIHF All-Time Russian National Team ahead of Russian and Soviet all-time greats such as Sergei Makarov, Alex Ovechkin, and Pavel Datsyuk, among others. The list included both Russian and Soviet players, part of a series of lists for 16 countries who would have participated in the canceled 2020 IIHF World Championship, to celebrate the 100-year anniversary of the IIHF World Championships.

== Playing style ==
Malkin has been described as a centre with offensive abilities and defensive awareness. He has also been known to play on the wing and on the point during the power play. He is a skater with firm balance and above average top speed and agility at the NHL level. In his early years, Malkin was a physical player who threw big hits. He relies on his hockey IQ and athleticism most times to avoid checks by opponents. He has an arsenal of shots (slap, wrist, backhand, and snap), and has stick-handling ability.

"He's so big and strong and he doesn't mind the physicality. That's what separates him apart from other players that are gifted offensive players. He wants the puck all the time and he'll go through a check or take a check to make a play."

— Steven Stamkos on Malkin, June 2012

"He's just one of those guys that wants the puck all the time. For me, it was get him the puck as much as possible. With his ability to feed me and my ability to shoot the puck, it worked really well. I just got open as much as I could. I'd just get him the puck as fast as I could because I knew I was going to get it back wherever I was on the ice, it was coming back."

— James Neal on Malkin, December 2017

== Personal life ==
In 2006, Malkin opened a restaurant, VIP Zone, in Magnitogorsk, which had been designed to look like the inside of a prison. In 2009, Malkin confirmed VIP Zone had been leased to new owners who had updated it.

Malkin became engaged to Russian television personality Anna Kasterova in November 2015; they married in 2016. On 31 May 2016, their son was born. Malkin has American citizenship, saying Pittsburgh is his "second home" and that his child also has an American passport.

In November 2017, Malkin announced his membership of the PutinTeam social movement, launched by compatriot and fellow NHL player Alexander Ovechkin in support of the President of Russia Vladimir Putin during the 2018 Russian presidential election. Malkin stated, "We just try to offer our support because, in 2018, we have the World Cup in Russia; they have elections, too."

== Career statistics ==
=== Regular season and playoffs ===
Bold indicates led league

			Regular season					Playoffs
Season	Team	League	GP	G	A	Pts	PIM	GP	G	A	Pts	PIM
2002–03	Metallurg–2 Magnitogorsk	RUS-3	28	8	6	14	18	—	—	—	—	—
2003–04	Metallurg Magnitogorsk	RSL	34	3	9	12	12	—	—	—	—	—
2003–04	Metallurg–2 Magnitogorsk	RUS-3	2	1	0	1	8	—	—	—	—	—
2004–05	Metallurg Magnitogorsk	RSL	52	12	20	32	24	5	0	4	4	0
2004–05	Metallurg–2 Magnitogorsk	RUS-3	2	1	1	2	2	—	—	—	—	—
2005–06	Metallurg Magnitogorsk	RSL	46	21	26	47	46	11	5	10	15	41
2006–07	Pittsburgh Penguins	NHL	78	33	52	85	80	5	0	4	4	8
2007–08	Pittsburgh Penguins	NHL	82	47	59	106	78	20	10	12	22	24
2008–09	Pittsburgh Penguins	NHL	82	35	**78**	**113**	80	24	14	**22**	**36**	51
2009–10	Pittsburgh Penguins	NHL	67	28	49	77	100	13	5	6	11	6
2010–11	Pittsburgh Penguins	NHL	43	15	22	37	18	—	—	—	—	—
2011–12	Pittsburgh Penguins	NHL	75	50	59	**109**	70	6	3	5	8	6
2012–13	Metallurg Magnitogorsk	KHL	37	23	42	65	58	—	—	—	—	—
2012–13	Pittsburgh Penguins	NHL	31	9	24	33	36	15	4	12	16	26
2013–14	Pittsburgh Penguins	NHL	60	23	49	72	62	13	6	8	14	8
2014–15	Pittsburgh Penguins	NHL	69	28	42	70	60	5	0	0	0	0
2015–16	Pittsburgh Penguins	NHL	57	27	31	58	65	23	6	12	18	18
2016–17	Pittsburgh Penguins	NHL	62	33	39	72	77	25	10	18	**28**	53
2017–18	Pittsburgh Penguins	NHL	78	42	56	98	87	9	4	4	8	16
2018–19	Pittsburgh Penguins	NHL	68	21	51	72	89	4	1	2	3	6
2019–20	Pittsburgh Penguins	NHL	55	25	49	74	58	4	0	1	1	6
2020–21	Pittsburgh Penguins	NHL	33	8	20	28	24	4	1	4	5	8
2021–22	Pittsburgh Penguins	NHL	41	20	22	42	24	7	3	3	6	6
2022–23	Pittsburgh Penguins	NHL	82	27	56	83	82	—	—	—	—	—
2023–24	Pittsburgh Penguins	NHL	82	27	40	67	70	—	—	—	—	—
2024–25	Pittsburgh Penguins	NHL	68	16	34	50	42	—	—	—	—	—
2025–26	Pittsburgh Penguins	NHL	56	19	42	61	61	6	2	1	3	6
RSL totals			132	36	55	91	82	16	5	14	19	41
NHL totals			1,269	533	874	1,407	1,263	183	69	114	183	248
KHL totals			37	23	42	65	58	—	—	—	—	—

=== International ===
Year	Team	Event	Result	GP	G	A	Pts	PIM
2003	Russia	WJC18	3rd place, bronze medalist(s)	6	5	4	9	2
2004	Russia	WJC	5th	6	1	4	5	0
2004	Russia	WJC18	1st place, gold medalist(s)	6	4	4	8	31
2005	Russia	WJC	2nd place, silver medalist(s)	6	3	7	10	16
2005	Russia	WC	3rd place, bronze medalist(s)	9	0	4	4	8
2006	Russia	WJC	2nd place, silver medalist(s)	6	4	6	10	12
2006	Russia	OLY	4th	7	2	4	6	31
2006	Russia	WC	5th	7	3	6	9	6
2007	Russia	WC	3rd place, bronze medalist(s)	9	5	5	10	6
2010	Russia	OLY	6th	4	3	3	6	0
2010	Russia	WC	2nd place, silver medalist(s)	5	5	2	7	10
2012	Russia	WC	1st place, gold medalist(s)	10	11	8	19	4
2014	Russia	OLY	5th	5	1	2	3	2
2014	Russia	WC	1st place, gold medalist(s)	4	2	1	3	2
2015	Russia	WC	2nd place, silver medalist(s)	9	5	5	10	8
2016	Russia	WCH	SF	4	1	2	3	2
2019	Russia	WC	3rd place, bronze medalist(s)	10	1	5	6	4
Junior totals				30	17	25	42	61
Senior totals				83	39	47	86	81

== Awards and honours ==
=== NHL ===
National Hockey League
Award	Year
NHL YoungStars Game	2007
Calder Memorial Trophy	2007
NHL All-Star Game	2008, 2009, 2011, 2012, 2015, 2016, 2017
NHL first All-Star team	2008, 2009, 2012
NHL All Star SuperSkills Accuracy Winner	2009
Art Ross Trophy	2009, 2012
Stanley Cup champion	2009, 2016, 2017
Conn Smythe Trophy	2009
Hart Memorial Trophy	2012
Ted Lindsay Award	2012

=== IIHF ===
International
Award	Year
World Championship All-Star team	2007, 2010, 2012
World Championship Best Forward	2012
World Championship Most Valuable Player	2012
IIHF All-Time Russia Team	2020

=== Pittsburgh Penguins team awards ===
Penguins team awards
Award	Year
Michel Briere Memorial Trophy	2007 (with Jordan Staal)
A.T. Caggiano Memorial Booster Club Award	2008, 2009, 2012
Most Valuable Player Award	2008, 2009, 2012, 2019
The Edward J. DeBartolo Community Service Award	2012

=== Other awards ===
Other awards
Award	Year
Dapper Dan Sportsman of the Year	2009
Kharlamov Trophy	2012, 2017

=== Records ===
- First player since 1917–18 to score goals in each of his first six NHL games (first accomplished by Joe Malone, Newsy Lalonde and Cy Denneny in inaugural NHL season) (18 October – 1 November 2006)
- Longest point streak by a Russian player in the NHL – 15 games (accomplished twice) (surpassed Dmitri Kvartalnov of the Boston Bruins – 14 games in 1992)
- Most consecutive postseason games with multiple points for the Pittsburgh Penguins – 6 games ( 9–23 May 2009)
- Most playoff points in a single season by a Russian player – 36 (2008–09)
- First Russian player to win the Conn Smythe Trophy (2009)

== See also ==
- List of NHL players with 50-goal seasons
- List of NHL players with 100-point seasons
- List of NHL players with 1,000 points
- List of NHL players with 1,000 games played
- List of NHL players with 500 goals

Awards and achievements
Preceded by Marc-André Fleury	Pittsburgh Penguins first-round draft pick 2004	Succeeded by Sidney Crosby
Preceded by Alexander Ovechkin	Winner of the Calder Memorial Trophy; 2007	Succeeded by Patrick Kane
Preceded by Alexander Ovechkin; Daniel Sedin	Winner of the Art Ross Trophy; 2009; 2012	Succeeded by Henrik Sedin; Martin St. Louis
Preceded by Henrik Zetterberg	Winner of the Conn Smythe Trophy; 2009	Succeeded by Jonathan Toews
Preceded by Corey Perry	Winner of the Hart Memorial Trophy; 2012	Succeeded by Alexander Ovechkin
Preceded by Daniel Sedin	Winner of the Ted Lindsay Award; 2012	Succeeded by Sidney Crosby
