= Rudolf Kleiner =

Swiss speed skater

Personal information
- Nationality: Swiss
- Born: 21 June 1924; Basel-Stadt, Switzerland
- Died: 9 September 2012 (aged 88); Binningen, Switzerland

Sport
- Sport: Speed skating

Rudolf Kleiner (21 June 1924 – 9 September 2012) was a Swiss speed skater. He competed in two events at the 1948 Winter Olympics.
