= Sepp Rogger =

Swiss speed skater

Personal information
- Nationality: Swiss
- Born: 19 August 1915; Davos, Switzerland
- Died: 6 October 2011 (aged 96); Davos, Switzerland

Sport
- Sport: Speed skating

Sepp Rogger (19 August 1915 – 6 October 2011) was a Swiss speed skater. He competed in two events at the 1948 Winter Olympics.
