= Gebhard Poltera =

Swiss ice hockey player

Personal information
- Born: 14 November 1923
- Died: 11 November 2008 (aged 84)
Medal record
Men's Ice Hockey
Bronze medal – third place	1948 St. Moritz	Team

Gebhard Poltera (14 November 1923 – 11 November 2008) was an ice hockey player for the Swiss national team. He won a silver medal at the 1948 Winter Olympics.
