= Heini Lohrer =

Swiss ice hockey player

Personal information
- Born: 29 June 1918 Arosa, Switzerland
- Died: 12 December 2011 (aged 93)
Medal record
Men's Ice Hockey
Bronze medal – third place	1948 St. Moritz	Team

Heinrich Lohrer (29 June 1918 – 12 December 2011) was an ice hockey player for the Swiss national team. He won a bronze medal at the 1948 Winter Olympics. He was a brother of Werner Lohrer.
