= Paul Eberhard =

Swiss bobsledder (1917–1983)

Olympic medal record

Bobsleigh
| Silver medal – second place | 1948 St. Moritz | Two-man |

Paul Hans Eberhard (30 October 1917 – 4 September 1983) was a Swiss bobsledder who competed in the late 1940s. He won the silver medal in the two-man event at the 1948 Winter Olympics in St. Moritz. He was born in Bülach and died in Küsnacht.
