= Max Müller (cross-country skier) =

Swiss cross-country skier

Max Müller (27 June 1916 – 22 November 2019) was a Swiss cross-country skier who competed in the 1948 Winter Olympics. In 1948, he was a member of the Swiss relay team that finished fifth in the 4x10 km relay competition. In the 50 km event he finished 17th and in the 18 km competition he finished 25th.
