= Beat Rüedi =

Swiss ice hockey player

Medal record

Representing Switzerland

Men's Ice Hockey
| Bronze medal – third place | 1948 St. Moritz | Team |

Beat Rüedi (February 19, 1920 – October 29, 2009) was an ice hockey player for the Swiss national team. He won a bronze medal at the 1948 Winter Olympics.
