= Hans Bänninger =

Swiss ice hockey player

Personal information
- Born: 17 March 1924
- Died: 22 August 2007 (aged 83)
Medal record
Representing Switzerland
Men's Ice Hockey
Bronze medal – third place	1948 St. Moritz	Team

Hans Bänninger (17 March 1924 – 22 August 2007) was an ice hockey player for the Swiss national team. He won a silver medal at the 1948 Winter Olympics.

In 2020 he was introduced in to the IIHF All-Time Switzerland Team.
