= Reto Perl =

Swiss ice hockey player

- Born: November 23, 1923 Davos, Switzerland
- Died: February 27, 1987 (aged 63)
- Position: Goaltender
- Played for: HC Davos; EHC Arosa
- National team: Switzerland
Medal record
Men's Ice Hockey
Bronze medal – third place	1948 St. Moritz	Team

Reto Perl (November 23, 1923 – February 27, 1987) was an ice hockey player for the Swiss national team. He won a silver medal at the 1948 Winter Olympics.
