= Walter Dürst =

Swiss ice hockey player

- Born: 28 February 1927 Davos, Switzerland
- Died: 2 May 2016 (aged 89)
- Position: Left Wing/Defence
- Played for: HC Davos
- National team: Switzerland
Medal record
Men's Ice Hockey
Bronze medal – third place	1948 St. Moritz	Team

Walter Paul Dürst (28 February 1927 – 2 May 2016) was an ice hockey player for the Swiss national team. He won a bronze medal at the 1948 Winter Olympics.
