= Hans-Martin Trepp =

Swiss ice hockey player

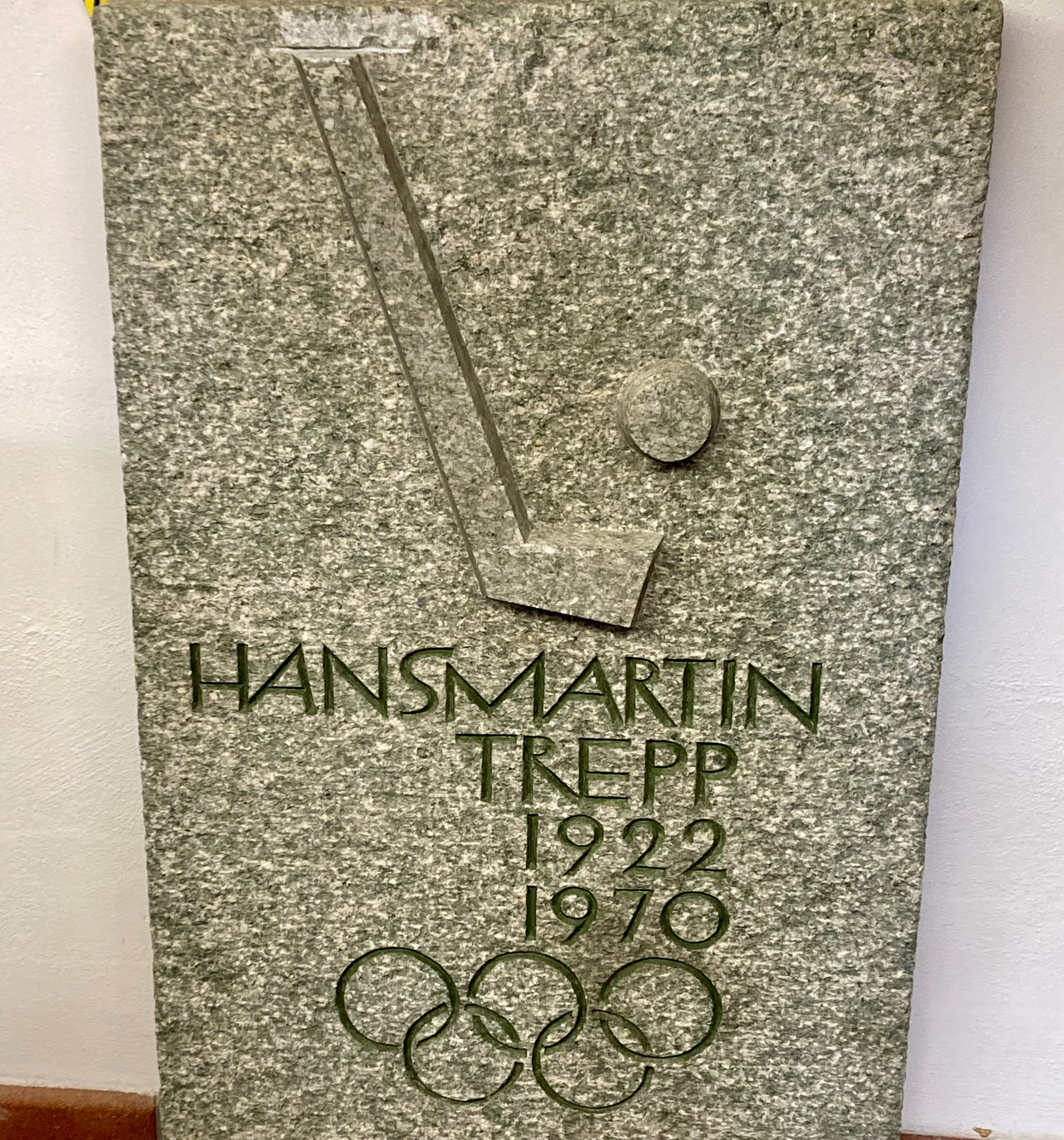
- Tombstone of Icehockey player Hans-Martin Trepp at Arosa/Switzerland
- Born: 9 November 1922
- Died: 17 August 1970 (aged 47)
- Position: Forward
- Played for: EHC Arosa
- National team: Switzerland
- Playing career: 1939–1965
Medal record
Men's Ice Hockey
Olympic Games
Bronze medal – third place	1948 St. Moritz	Team
World Championships
Bronze medal – third place	1951 London	Team
Bronze medal – third place	1952 Paris	Team
Bronze medal – third place	1953 Switzerland	Team
European Championships
Gold medal – first place	1950 London	Team
Silver medal – second place	1951 Paris	Team
Bronze medal – third place	1947 Prague	Team
Bronze medal – third place	1949 Stockholm	Team
Bronze medal – third place	1952 Oslo	Team
Bronze medal – third place	1953 Switzerland	Team

Hans-Martin Trepp (9 November 1922 – 17 August 1970) was an ice hockey player for EHC Arosa and the Swiss national team where he scored 83 goals in 94 matches. He won a bronze medal at the 1948 Winter Olympics. He appeared in the World Championships four times, winning three bronze medals in 1950, 1951 and 1953.

Trepp played for EHC Arosa from 1939 to 1965, winning seven consecutive national titles from 1951 to 1957.

In 2020 he was introduced to the IIHF All-Time Switzerland Team.

== Death ==
Trepp died in 1970 after an accidental fall in his home where he fractured his skull.

== Personal life ==
Trepp was the cousin of track cyclist Willy Trepp.
