= Hans Dürst =

Swiss ice hockey player

Personal information
- Born: 28 June 1921 Davos, Switzerland
- Died: 25 June 2001 (aged 79) Milan, Italy
Medal record
Men's Ice Hockey
Bronze medal – third place	1948 St. Moritz	Team

Hans Dürst (28 June 1921 – 25 June 2001) was an ice hockey player for the Swiss national team. He won a bronze medal at the 1948 Winter Olympics.
