= Werner Lohrer =

Swiss ice hockey player

Personal information
- Born: March 4, 1917 Arosa, Switzerland
- Died: 1991 (aged 73–74)
Medal record
Men’s Ice Hockey
Bronze medal – third place	1948 St. Moritz	Team

Werner Lohrer (March 4, 1917 – 1991) was an ice hockey player for the Swiss national team. He won a bronze medal at the 1948 Winter Olympics. He was a brother of Heini Lohrer.
