= Ulrich Poltera =

Swiss ice hockey player

Personal information
- Born: 17 July 1922 Arosa, Switzerland
- Died: 22 March 1994 (aged 71) Chur, Switzerland
Medal record
Men's Ice Hockey
Bronze medal – third place	1948 St. Moritz	Team

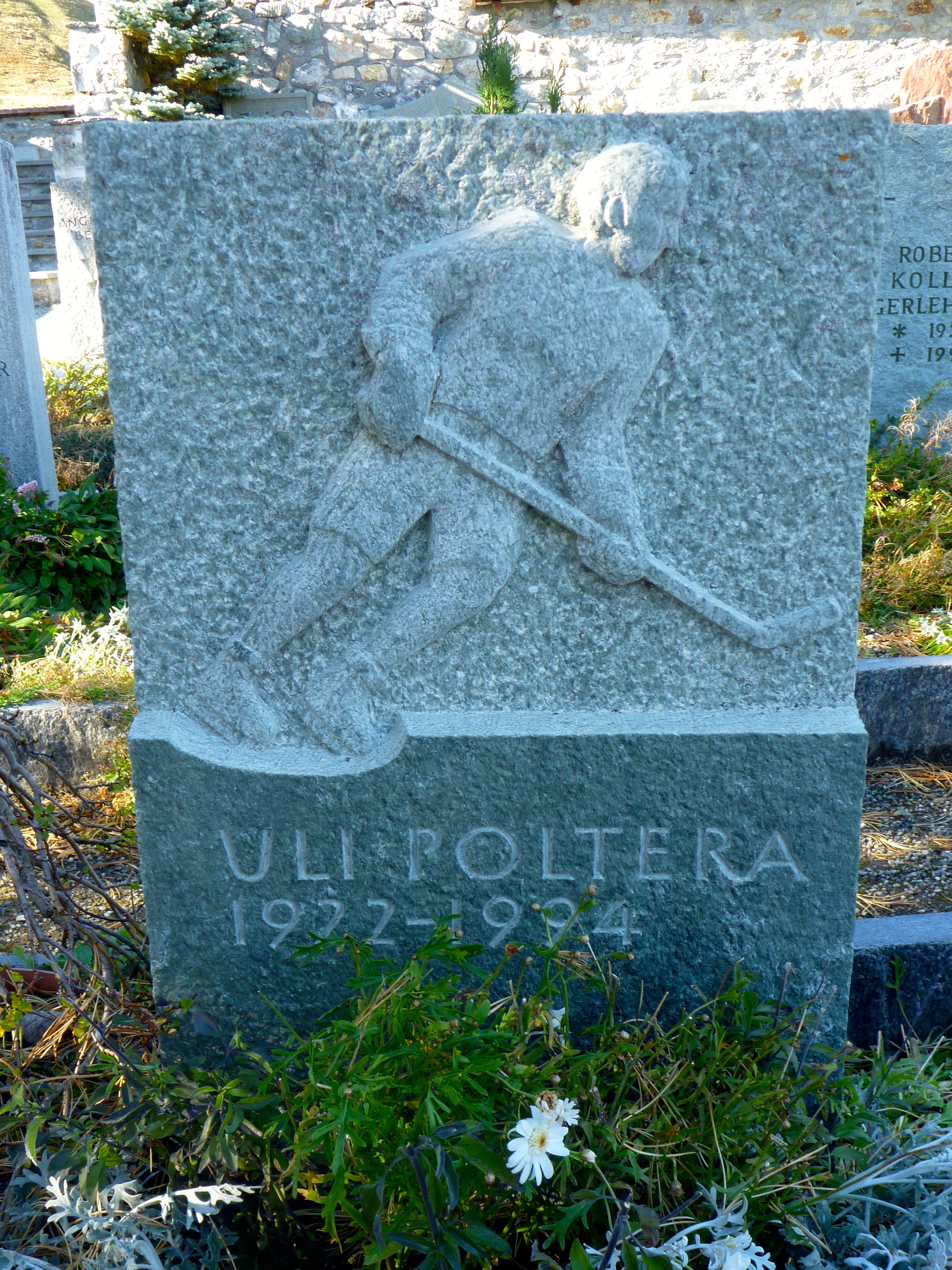
Grave of Ueli Poltera at Arosa, Switzerland

Ulrich "Uli" Poltera (17 July 1922 – 22 March 1994) was an ice hockey player for the Swiss national team. He won a bronze medal at the 1948 Winter Olympics.
