= Alfred Bieler =

Swiss ice hockey player

Personal information
- Born: 18 April 1923 St. Moritz, Switzerland
- Died: 24 April 2013 (aged 90) Zurich, Switzerland
Medal record
Men's Ice Hockey
Bronze medal – third place	1948 St. Moritz	Team

Alfred "Fredy" Bieler (18 April 1923 – 24 April 2013) was an ice hockey player for the Swiss national team. He won a bronze medal at the 1948 Winter Olympics.
