= Emil Handschin =

Swiss ice hockey player

Personal information
- Born: 19 March 1928
- Died: 27 May 1990 (aged 62)

Sport
- Country: Switzerland
- Sport: Ice Hockey
- Event: Men's Ice Hockey
Medal record
Men's Ice Hockey
Representing Switzerland
1948 Winter Olympics
Bronze medal – third place	1948 St. Moritz	Team

Emil Handschin (19 March 1928 – 27 May 1990) was an ice hockey player for the Swiss national team. He won a bronze medal at the 1948 Winter Olympics.
