= Compton Cricket Club =

California exhibition cricket club

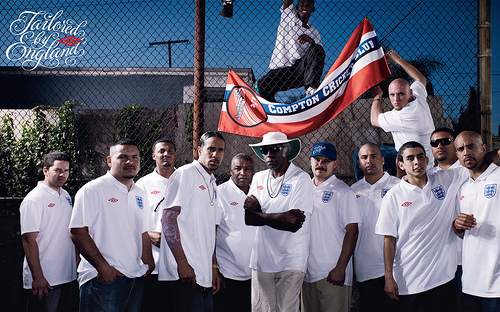
Umbro photographs The Compton CC in South Central LA, February 2009

The Compton Cricket Club (CCC), or the "Homies and the POPz", is a cricket club based in Compton, Los Angeles County, California, USA. The CCC is the only all American-born exhibition cricket team. The CCC has toured the United Kingdom four times.

On the night of the photoshoot for an advertising campaign featuring the CCC modelling the new National English Football jersey in LA, one of the team members was fatally shot as an innocent bystander in a drive-by shooting in Compton.

== Background and mission of the team ==
The badge and motto of the Compton Cricket Club

The team was originally called the Los Angeles Krickets. In the early 1990s, the club toured England, where they played at Hambledon. Upon their return, the Los Angeles Krickets took a new direction after Disney signed all members of the team up for a film project. The publicity garnered by the tour was unprecedented in American cricket circles and included coverage by BBC Four, KTLA, ITV, Sky News, The Australian, The Daily Telegraph and numerous local newspapers in England and Australia.

Compton Cricket Club was started at the Dome Village Homeless Community in Downtown Los Angeles in 1995, by US homeless activist Ted Hayes and Hollywood movie producer Katy Haber, to combat the negative effects of poverty and homelessness. After a highly successful tour of Great Britain later that year, the LA Krickets expanded to include inner city Latino gang members from the City of Compton. The Compton Homies and the Popz (Compton Cricket Club) emerged in 1996 as the first All American Inner City Cricket Team. The club uses the ideals of sportsmanship, and the particular importance of etiquette and fair play in cricket, to help players develop respect for authority, a sense of self-esteem and self-discipline. The Compton Homies travelled to the UK in 1997, 1999, and 2001, joined LASCA (the Los Angeles Social Cricket Alliance) and won the British Cup twice.

(Team Founder, Compton Cricket Club, Ted Hayes)

The 'Homies' mission is to:

1. Curb the negative effects of gang activities amongst the youth of Compton.
2. Addressing homelessness in the inner city through the principles and ethics of cricket.
3. Encourage and promote civility, good and productive citizenship.

The team motto of 'Let the game begin again in America' harkens back to the former popularity of cricket in the United States during the 19th century.

The majority of the team is formed of the founding members and Hayes sees them as a "cross-generational village-like team".

== Tour highlights ==
The LA KRICKETS 1995 tour of the UK laid the ground rules for future tours, sponsorships, and partners, resulting in a movie deal with Disney. Since then, the Compton Homes and the Popz (CCC) 1997, 1999 and 2001 tours included games against the Windsor Castle Staff cricket team, "Rap" session rapping for HRH Prince Edward at Windsor Castle, a visit with His Royal Highness at Buckingham Palace, and with the Rt Hon Mo Mowlam at Stormont Castle, a cricket bat presentation to Gerry Adams at Stormont, Belfast and a Hurling Stick to David Pringle, to help broker the peace accord in Northern Ireland.

A 2001 Game against the legendary Lashings team, with Brian Lara playing on the CCC cricket Club side.

In 2003, Warwickshire cricketer Paul Smith spent three weeks helping train the CCC. The trip was a part of Smith's work with 'Cricket Without Boundaries', a charity that seeks to empower communities through cricket.

== Current activities and plans ==
=== CCC vs the Afghan national cricket team ===
A match with the Afghanistan national cricket team is being planned. The original date for this groundbreaking cricket event had to be postponed due to lack of funding for the National Cricket team from Afghanistan to fly from their home camp to Los Angeles for the historical match.

This will be the first time that a cricket team from Afghanistan has toured America. The match will help raise money for an orphanage rebuilt by US marines in Afghanistan and continue the CCC's vital work around the world promoting greater peace through 'cricket diplomacy'.

=== Tour of Australia ===
The clubs hopes that their recent historic Australian tour January 31 – February 12, 2011 will continue their development into a world class competitive and exhibition cricket team and sporting club, while the publicity generated by the tour will be used to highlight other Australian non-profit organizations that deal with similar issues in their own communities. Touring Australia also aims to raise awareness of the CCC with key stakeholders to improve cricket opportunities between the US and Australia.

The proposed tour and background to the Compton Cricket Club has recently (May 2007 – February 2010) received considerable attention in mainstream Australian and international media including CNN, Sky News, Channel 7, Sydney Morning Herald, ABC Radio National, Alpha magazine, Courier Mail, NT News, Ninemsn.com, ESPN.com, Dailynews.com, Dumbo Feather, pass it on magazine, Centralian advocate & the Big Issue magazine. They have also been publicized on KPFK (Radio) and KABC-TV in Los Angeles USA. Music publicity includes articles in Faster Louder (online) and 3D music magazine as well as Sky News UK, and SBS World News (Sam Ikin, Jan 3, 2008).

The CCC will utilise its high exposure to benefit other organizations in Australia attempting to deal with similar issues in their own community including:

1. Credo Cricket, who provide recreational opportunities for disadvantaged
2. Father Chris Rileys Youth off the Streets Program,
3. Queensland premiers disaster relief fund, raising much needed support for victims of the devastating 2010–2011 Queensland floods.

Project Manager for their Australian Tour, Mr Hugh Snelgrove presented the team's story as well as what he has planned for their historic tour at The Pecha Kucha (Sydney Chapter) fundraising night for Haiti at the Museum of Contemporary Art, Sydney at the beginning of 2010.

=== Cricket Rap outta compton: "Bullets" (3:51) ===
The club has recently released two tracks from raps 'Shots' and 'Bullets' that aim to document their transition from ex-gangsters to global stardom. Their cricket raps have recently (November 2007) aired on FBI 94.5 FM & 93.7 FM Koori Radio programs respectively in Australia.

A music video along with a press release about the Compton Cricket Club produced by current members plans to be presented to the public by the end of 2008.

In March 2009, SKY News released an article about the team's endeavors producing and publicising their inaugural Music TV video clip on their website.

On March 13 Bullets was played at Los Angeles City Hall to cricket fans, diplomats, and members of local cricket organizations of Southern California a part of a solidarity rally, to protest the recent terrorist attack on the Sri Lankan national cricket team in Lahore, Pakistan.

In March, MTV (UK) played 'Bullets' on their website a part of their 'show us what your made of' itdoesnthavetohappen.co.uk anti knife crime campaign on their website.

In April, Neil Hannon blogging for The Guardian Newspaper (UK) called 'Bullets' a great song about cricket. This was soon followed with another article in major Australian newspaper, The Age affirming 'Bullets' global appeal and critical acclaim.

In May, Channel V – Australia's premier music television station chose Bullets to be played on its interactive music TV Show 'U Channel'. On April 27, 28 and 29 'Bullets' was voted No. 1 unsigned artist by Channel V's TV and web audience.

On May 9 Cloth & the Compton CC performed at the Hollywood Ashes celebrity Cricket tournament.

=== First Sydney fundraiser pre-tour promotion ===
In September, four members of the CCC flew to Sydney to attend a fundraiser in their honor, to raise much needed funds for their Australian tour. The fundraiser held on September 25 raised over $30,000 in cash and tour sponsorship. Cricket Australia, Nudie Juice, Cricket NSW, The Hughenden Hotel, Santavittoria, Otway Estate Wines, Curwoods Lawyers, Kewarra Resort Cairns and The Royals.

The club members airfares and fundraiser was paid for and organised by Hugh Snelgrove, who was also the project manager of the Australian tour.

During their ten days in Sydney, they appeared on The TODAY Show, 2GB/Christian/Koori Radio, The Age, Daily Telegraph & Thepunch.com.au.

Other highlights included:

- Meeting with youth from Father Chris Riley's Youth Off The Streets charity in Merrylands, Sydney.
- A chance encounter with Brett Lee at the Sydney Cricket Ground during a private tour from Cricket NSW. He was training mentee Ellyse Perry (The only Australian sportswoman to play two codes of sport professionally for Australia).
- A beach cricket match against Aboriginal charity A.I.M.E (Australian Indigenous Mentoring Experience).
- A mural 'Cricket outta Compton' was painted on the famous Bondi graffiti promenade (By famous Australian street artists Mr Perso & Detch) which commemorated two club members who have since died (one from a drive by shooting and the other from a motorcycle accident).
- Playing laneway cricket between Credo Cricket and Cricket Victoria staff at the famous Hosier Lane.
- A tour of the Melbourne Cricket Ground organised by Cricket Australia.
- An indoor cricket match against Reclink (well known for their highly successful Choir of Hard Knocks reality TV program) in Melbourne.
- Being invited to Urthboy's concert at The Factory in Sydney where we presented him during one of his sets with a 'Cricket outta Compton' T-shirt.
- A documentary night with the homies at Australia square hosted by the Australian tours honorary solicitors Curwoods lawyers of Sydney.
- Releasing their third single Shots with the catchy 'front foot, back foot, square cut or a hook' dance number.
- A limited first run of 'Cricket outta Compton' T-shirts were released to the public.
- Australian tour website www.cricketouttacompton.com.au is launched.

=== Historic Australia Tour January 29 – February 12, 2011 ===
Between January 29 and February 12, 2011 the Compton Cricket Club became the first all American born cricket club to tour Australia. Highlights from the tour included:

Money raised:

- Raising $1,500 for the Queensland Premier's flood relief appeal at A night with All the homies, catered by Australian celebrity chef Bill Granger's restaurant Bills.

Tour highlights:

- Launching an Australian tour with a press conference in the Long Bar at the Sydney Cricket Ground (SCG).
- The first match played on Australian soil was against the University of Sydney.
- The first Aboriginal side played was the Redfern All Blacks.
- Meeting national Minister for Sport Mark Arbib at his office in Sydney.
- Meeting the deputy Lord Mayor of Sydney at Sydney Town Hall for morning tea.
- Hosted by Father Chris Riley's Youth off the Streets in Brighton for a gala lunch with over sixty teenagers.
- Being personally invited to the National English Cricket team's private training session at the SCG.
- Playing direct relatives of the first Australian cricket team to tour overseas, the all aboriginal 1868 touring side to the UK, in Harrow, Victoria.
- Performing their first public performance of their world famous hip hop cricket rap 'Bullets' & 'Shots' at World Bar in Kings Cross, Sydney.
- One of the club members, Isaac Hayes having 'From gats to bats' with the image of a cricket bat over an AK-47 assault rifle tattooed on his right shoulder by renowned street artist Emit from Sydney.
- Mr Perso painting 'cricket outta Compton' mural in Camperdown.
- Appearing on all major national television networks: ABC, Seven Network, Nine Network and Network Ten.
- Playing Urbanseed's homeless cricket club, Australian Cricket Society , Johnny Mullugh XI, Redfern All Blacks, Sydney University.
- Speaking and performing their hip hop cricket rap to high school students of Alexandria Park High School and Newington College.
- A reunion with Barry Firebrace in Melbourne who was a team member from an all Indigenous side that toured the UK and played against the CCC in 2001. The Indigenous Australian's tour in 2001 was commemorating the 1868 tour to the UK by a roving XI of Aboriginal players – the first Australian cricket team to tour to England (See Ashley Malletts The Black Lords of Summer: The Story of the 1868 Aboriginal Tour of England and Beyond, University of Queensland Press, 2002), ISBN 0-7022-3262-9.

Awards

- News feature on Compton Cricket Club Australia tour voted #1 story on ABC TV's Stateline segment.
- Kate Healy's photograph of a one-off match between Johnny Mullagh XI and American team Compton Homies and Popz at Harrow voted most outstanding single photograph or series of photographs relating to cricket in Victoria at the Cricket Victoria 2011 Media Awards.
