= French National Olympic and Sports Committee =

- Country: France
- Code: FRA
- Created: 1894
- Recognized: 1894
- Continental Association: EOC
- Headquarters: Paris, France
- President: Amélie Oudéa-Castéra
- Secretary General: Jean Michel Brun
- Website: www.franceolympique.com
- Notes: Also includes: Guadeloupe; Martinique; French Guiana; Réunion; Mayotte; Saint Pierre and Miquelon; Wallis and Futuna; Collectivity of Saint Martin; Saint Barthélemy; New Caledonia; French Polynesia; French Southern and Antarctic Lands; (France) Clipperton Island

The French National Olympic and Sports Committee (French: Comité national olympique et sportif français, CNOSF; French pronunciation: [se.ɛno.ɛ.s‿ɛf]; IOC Code: FRA) is the National Olympic Committee of France. It is responsible for France's participation in the Olympic Games, as well as for all of France's overseas departments and territories.

== History ==
The French Olympic Committee was established in 1894 in Paris. In 1972, it merged with the National Sports Committee to form the French National Olympic and Sports Committee.

== List of presidents ==
This is following list of presidents:

Presidents of French Olympic Committee

President	Term
Pierre de Coubertin	1894–1913
Justinien de Clary	1913–1933
Armand Massard	1933–1967
Jean de Beaumont	1967–1971
Claude Collard	1971–1972

Presidents of National Sports Committee

President	Term
Duvignau de Lanneau	1908–1909
Marquis de Chasseloup-Laubat	1909–1910
Albert Glandaz	1910–1911
Duvignaud de Lanneau	1911–1912
Albert Glandaz	1912–1913
Justinien de Clary	1913–1925
Gaston Vidal	1925–1931
Jules Rimet	1931–1947
Alfred Eluère	1947–1967
Pierre Graux	1967–1971
François Chiarisoli	1971–1972

Presidents of French National Olympic and Sports Committee

President	Term
Claude Collard	1972–1982
Nelson Paillou	1982–1993
Henri Sérandour	1993–2009
Denis Masseglia	2009–2021
Brigitte Henriques	2021–2023
Astrid Guyart (interim)	2023
David Lappartient	2023–2025
Amélie Oudéa-Castéra	2025–present

== Member federations ==
The French National Federations are the organizations that coordinate all aspects of their individual sports. They are responsible for training, competition and development of their sports. There are currently 33 Olympic Summer and three Winter Sport Federations in France.

National Federation	Summer or Winter	Headquarters
French Archery Federation	Summer	Noisy-le-Grand, Paris
French Athletics Federation	Summer	Paris
French Badminton Federation	Summer	Saint-Ouen, Paris
French Baseball and Softball Federation	Summer	Paris
French Federation of Basketball	Summer	Paris
French Boxing Federation	Summer	Pantin, Paris
French Canoe-Kayak Federation	Summer	Joinville-le-Pont, Paris
French Cycling Federation	Summer	Montigny-le-Bretonneux, Paris
French Equestrian Federation	Summer	Lamotte-Beuvron
French Fencing Federation	Summer	Paris
French Football Federation	Summer	Paris
French Golf Federation	Summer	Levallois-Perret, Paris
French Gymnastics Federation	Summer	Paris
French Handball Federation	Summer	Gentilly, Paris
French Hockey Federation	Summer	Bagnolet, Paris
French Ice Hockey Federation	Winter	Cergy, Paris
French Federation of Ice Sports	Winter	Paris
French Judo Federation	Summer	Paris
French Karate Federation	Summer	Montrouge, Paris
French Modern Pentathlon Federation	Summer	Paris
French Federation of Mountaineering and Climbing	Summer	Paris
French Roller Sport Federation	Summer	Bordeaux
French Rowing Federation	Summer	Nogent-sur-Marne, Paris
French Rugby Federation	Summer	Marcoussis, Paris
French Sailing Federation	Summer	Paris
French Shooting Federation	Summer	Paris
French Ski Federation	Winter	Annecy
French Surfing Federation	Summer	Soorts-Hossegor
French Swimming Federation	Summer	Pantin, Paris
French Table Tennis Federation	Summer	Paris
French Federation of Taekwondo and Related Disciplines	Summer	Lyon
French Tennis Federation	Summer	Paris
French Triathlon Federation	Summer	Paris
French federation of underwater studies and sports	Summer	Marseille
French Volleyball Federation	Summer	Choisy-le-Roi, Paris
French Weightlifting Federation	Summer	Champigny-sur-Marne, Paris
French Wrestling Federation	Summer	Maisons-Alfort, Paris

== See also ==
- France at the Olympics
- French Equestrian Federation
