= William Deane =

Governor-General of Australia from 1996 to 2001

The Honourable Sir William Deane AC KBE KC
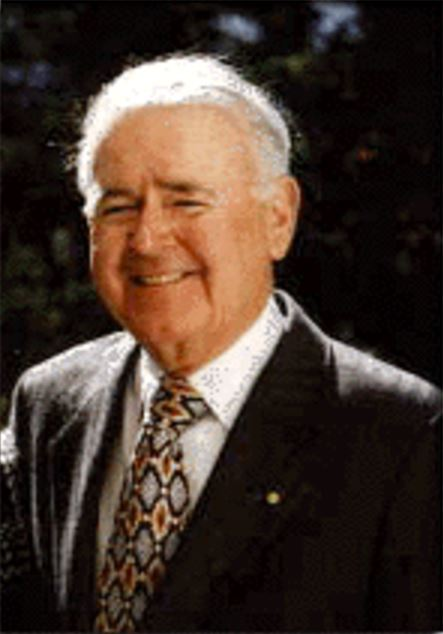
- Deane c. 2000

22nd Governor-General of Australia
- In office 16 February 1996 – 29 June 2001
- Monarch: Elizabeth II
- Prime Minister: Paul Keating; John Howard
- Preceded by: Bill Hayden
- Succeeded by: Peter Hollingworth

Justice of the High Court of Australia
- In office 25 June 1982 – 11 November 1995
- Nominated by: Malcolm Fraser
- Preceded by: Ninian Stephen
- Succeeded by: Michael Kirby

Personal details
- Born: William Patrick Deane; 4 January 1931 (age 95) St Kilda, Victoria, Australia
- Spouse: Helen Russell
- Children: 2
- Education: University of Sydney
- Profession: Barrister, jurist

Sir William Patrick Deane (born 4 January 1931) is an Australian barrister and jurist who served as the 22nd governor-general of Australia from 1996 to 2001. He was previously a Justice of the High Court of Australia from 1982 to 1995, during which time he was one of the judges who decided in favour of Eddie Mabo in the Mabo case.

Deane received his undergraduate education at the University of Sydney, and later studied international law at The Hague Academy of International Law in the Netherlands. Prior to joining the judiciary, Deane worked for periods as a barrister and university lecturer. He was appointed to the Supreme Court of New South Wales in 1977, and later that year was also appointed to the Federal Court of Australia. Deane was elevated to the High Court in 1982, and during his tenure was generally considered to fall on the court's progressive side. He retired from the court in 1995, and the following year was appointed governor-general on the recommendation of Paul Keating. Deane had a low profile during his five-year term, facing no major constitutional issues, but did come to international notice by officially opening the 2000 Summer Olympics and the 2000 Summer Paralympics.

== Early life ==
Deane was born on 4 January 1931 in Melbourne. He was the youngest of three children and only son born to Lillian Elizabeth (née Hussey) and Cornelius Aloysius Deane. His father grew up in a large Catholic family in Wahring, Victoria, and won the Military Cross during World War I. He later worked as a patent examiner. The family moved to Canberra in 1933, and Deane grew up in the suburb of Griffith. He attended St Christopher's Convent School in Manuka and later boarded in Sydney at St Joseph's College, Hunters Hill. He won an exhibition and Canberra scholarship to attend the University of Sydney, where he graduated Bachelor of Arts and Bachelor of Laws. He was a member of the staff of the Sydney Law Review and served on the Students' Representative Council and as secretary and vice-president of the Sydney University Law Society. He also trained with the University Air Squadron and attained a pilot's licence. In 1954 Deane won a Rotary Foundation Fellowship to undertake postgraduate studies in Europe. He was awarded a diploma from The Hague Academy of International Law in 1955.

After graduation, Deane worked in the federal Attorney-General's Department in Canberra and at the law firm Minter Simpson. He was called to the bar in 1957 and also lectured in law at university. Deane joined the Democratic Labor Party (DLP) in the 1950s and served on the party's executive. He later recalled having "very strong views on the threat of communism" at the time. He subsequently became disillusioned by factional disputes and ceased to have any involvement in politics.

== Judicial career ==
In 1977, Deane was appointed a Judge of the Supreme Court of New South Wales and, in the same year, he was appointed to the Federal Court of Australia and as President of the Australian Trade Practices Tribunal. In June 1982 he was appointed to the High Court of Australia, replacing Sir Ninian Stephen on his appointment as Governor-General. He received an imperial knighthood in August 1982. On the court he formed part of the majority that recognised native title in the landmark Mabo case of 1992.

== Governor-General ==
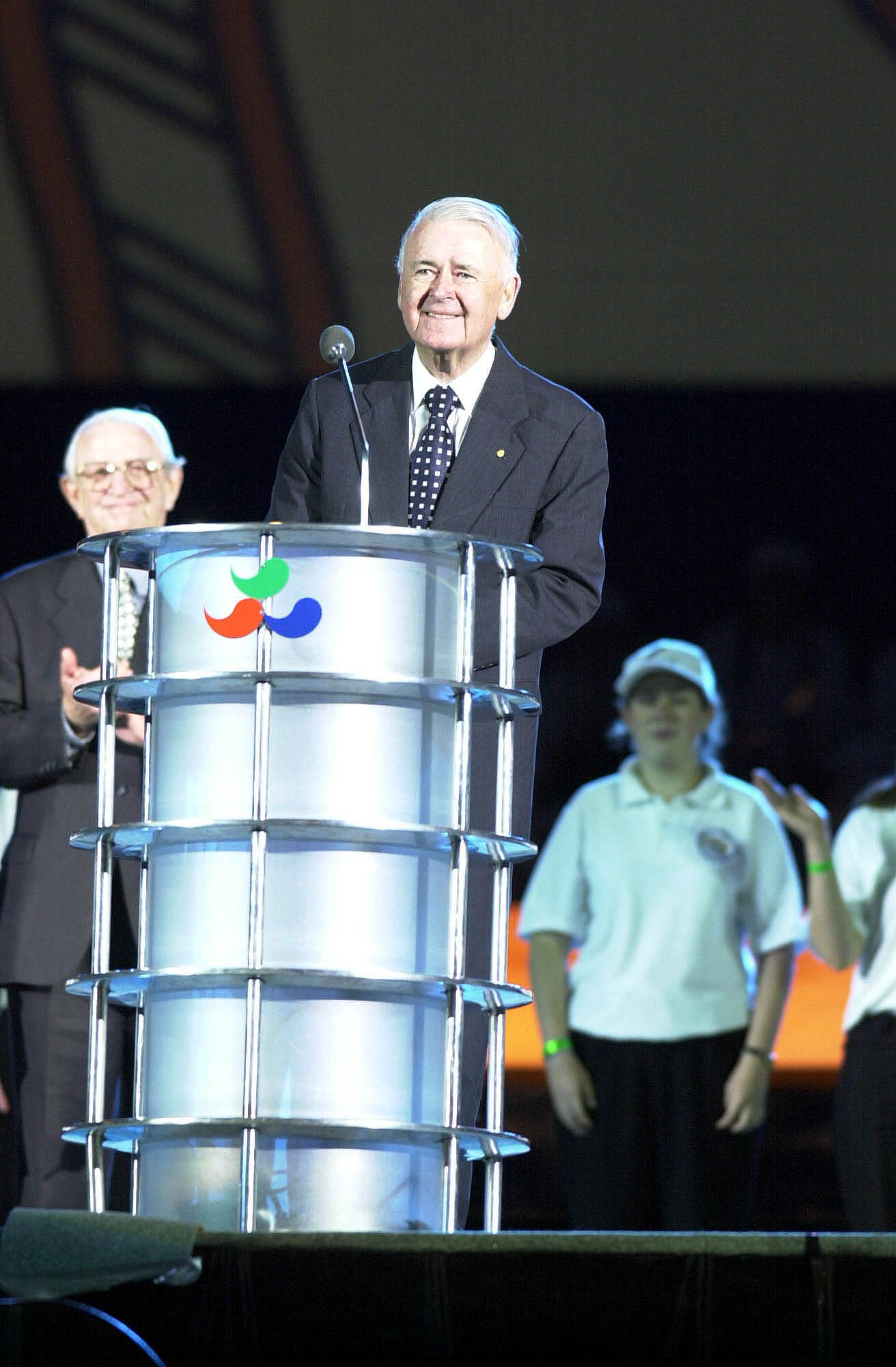
Deane at the opening ceremony of the 2000 Paralympic Games in Sydney

In August 1995, the Labor Prime Minister, Paul Keating, announced that Elizabeth II, Queen of Australia had agreed to the appointment of Deane as Governor-General to succeed Bill Hayden. Deane retired from the High Court in November and was sworn in as Governor-General on 16 February 1996. Less than a month later the Liberal/National coalition led by John Howard defeated Keating's government in the 1996 Australian federal election.

Deane was Australia's first Catholic governor-general. He "represented the Catholic social justice position on just about every issue that came forward". On 28 August 1996, as governor-general, Deane issued a proclamation that officially established 3 September as Australian National Flag Day.

As governor-general, Deane received praise for his role in publicly mourning the victims of tragedies that took place during his term in office, including the Port Arthur massacre (1996), the Thredbo landslide (1997) the Swiss canyoning disaster (1999) and the Childers Palace Backpackers Hostel fire (2000). His speech in Switzerland titled "It is still winter at home" was especially well received. He also was asked to deliver the eulogies at the funerals of several prominent Australians, including Sir Donald Bradman, Nugget Coombs, Dame Roma Mitchell, Sir Marcus Oliphant, and Mum Shirl.

Deane's term of office was due to expire on 31 December 2000, but was extended by six months to cover the Centenary of Federation celebrations. Upon leaving office in June 2001, he stated that his main regret as governor-general was that Australia did not achieve Reconciliation by the end of the 20th century as he had hoped. Howard stated he had "displayed an unfailing interest in the place of the disadvantaged within Australian society".

=== Olympics ===
Deane officially opened the 2000 Summer Olympics, giving a speech in front of a crowd of 110,000 people at the Sydney Olympic Stadium. Prime Minister John Howard had originally planned to open the games himself, with the agreement of the organizing committee and the International Olympic Committee (IOC). In November 1999, however, he changed his mind and advised the IOC that Deane would be opening the games. Howard said this was due to "a concern that my opening the Olympic Games would become a party political issue [...] I think in the long run it'll be better for the Olympic Games for the Governor-General to open them because we will be removing that one area of political controversy". Members of the opposition Labor Party had advocated that the Queen be asked to perform the honours, arguing that it was hypocritical for Howard to support the retention of the monarchy at the 1999 republic referendum but not call upon the Queen to represent Australia.

== Later years ==
Deane acted as Patron or co-Patron of a large number of charitable organisations working for the disadvantaged, including Matthew Talbot Homeless Services, Father Chris Riley's Youth off the Streets, the Starlight Foundation and the Australian Indigenous Education Foundation. He was also a Patron of Reconciliation Australia and of the Australian Indigenous Doctors Association. The Australian Capital Territory Government appointed him as Patron of the National Capital's 2013 Centenary Celebrations. Deane is a former Patron and Chair of international aid organisation CARE Australia and a member of its advisory board.

== Honours ==
Deane was appointed a Knight Commander of the Order of the British Empire (KBE) on 10 August 1982, a few weeks after being appointed to the High Court. On Australia Day 1988, he was made a Companion of the Order of Australia (AC). He is also a Knight Commander with Star of the Papal Order of St. Gregory the Great and a Knight of the Venerable Order of St. John. In 2001, Deane was awarded the Sydney Peace Prize "for his consistent support of vulnerable and disadvantaged Australians and his strong commitment to the cause of reconciliation".

Coat of arms of William Deane
Notes Granted 30 April 1999 by Brendan O Donoghue, Chief Herald of Ireland. Crest A lion's gamb in pale erased Azure holding a scale in balance Or. Escutcheon Argent a lion sejant affronty Azure armed and langued Gules holding in its dexter paw a trefoil slipped Vert and in the sinister paw a sprig of wattle Proper. On a chief of the second three dove's wings of the first. Supporters Two lions rampant guardant Azure armed and langued Gules imperially crowned Proper each charged on the shoulder with a trefoil slipped or. Motto Fides Et Lex

== Personal life ==
Deane married solicitor Helen Russell on 6 January 1965. The couple had one son and one daughter. He was described in 2002 as "a devout Catholic who regularly attends Mass at St Christopher's, Canberra".

Government offices
Preceded by Bill Hayden	Governor-General of Australia; 1996–2001	Succeeded by Peter Hollingworth
