= Romania at the 1900 Summer Olympics =

- IOC code: ROU

in Paris
- Competitors: 1 in 1 sport
- Medals: Gold 0 Silver 0 Bronze 0 Total 0

Summer Olympics appearances (overview)
- 1900; 1904–1920; 1924; 1928; 1932; 1936; 1948; 1952; 1956; 1960; 1964; 1968; 1972; 1976; 1980; 1984; 1988; 1992; 1996; 2000; 2004; 2008; 2012; 2016; 2020; 2024; 2028

One athlete from Romania, a trap shooter, competed at the 1900 Summer Olympics in Paris, France. It was the first appearance of the European nation, and only appearance until the 1924 Summer Olympics.

== Results by event ==
=== Shooting ===
Each shooter fired at 20 targets, scoring 1 point for each target hit.

Romania was represented by one shooter in its debut. He tied for 13th place in the trap shooting event.

Shooter	Event	Final	
Shooter	Event	Score	Rank
Gheorghe Plagino	Trap shooting	11	13
