= Justinien Clary =

French sport shooter (1860–1933)

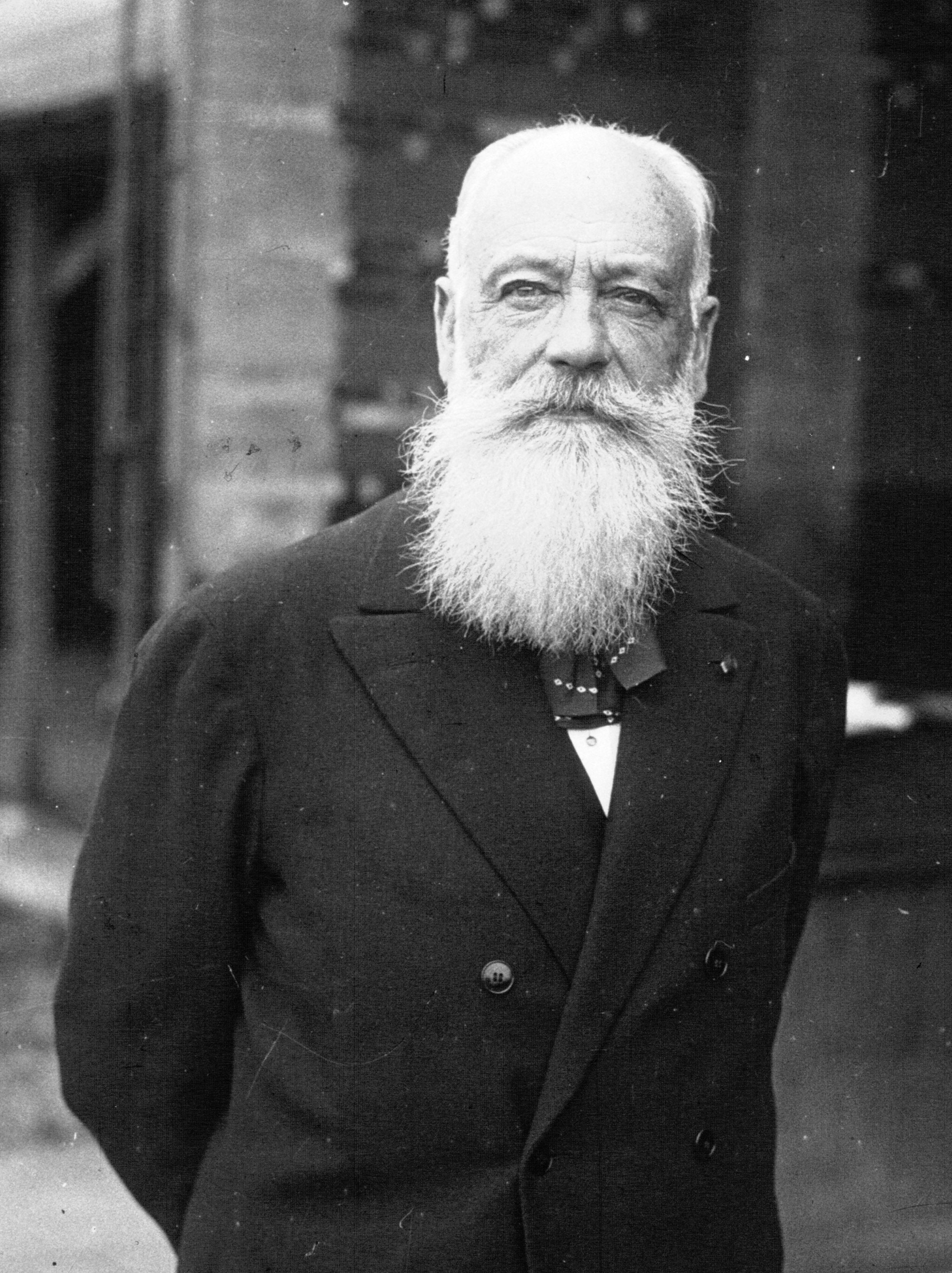
- Justinien Clary

Personal information
- Full name: Justinien Charles Xavier Bretonneau-Clary
- Born: 20 April 1860 Paris, Second French Empire
- Died: 13 June 1933 (aged 73) Paris, France

Sport
- Sport: Trap shooting
Medal record
Representing France
Olympic Games
Bronze medal – third place	1900 Paris	Trap shooting

Count Clary (born Justinien Charles Xavier Bretonneau; 20 April 1860 – 13 June 1933) was a French sport shooter who competed in the late 19th century and early 20th century in trap shooting. He participated in Shooting at the 1900 Summer Olympics in Paris and won the bronze medal in the trap competition. Fellow Frenchmen Roger de Barbarin and Rene Guyot won gold and silver respectively. He was born and died in Paris.
