= Plagino =

Plagino is a surname. Notable people with the surname include:

- Alexandru Plagino (1821–1849), Romanian politician
- Gheorghe Plagino (1876–1949), Romanian sport shooter and politician
