= List of people who have opened the Olympic Games =

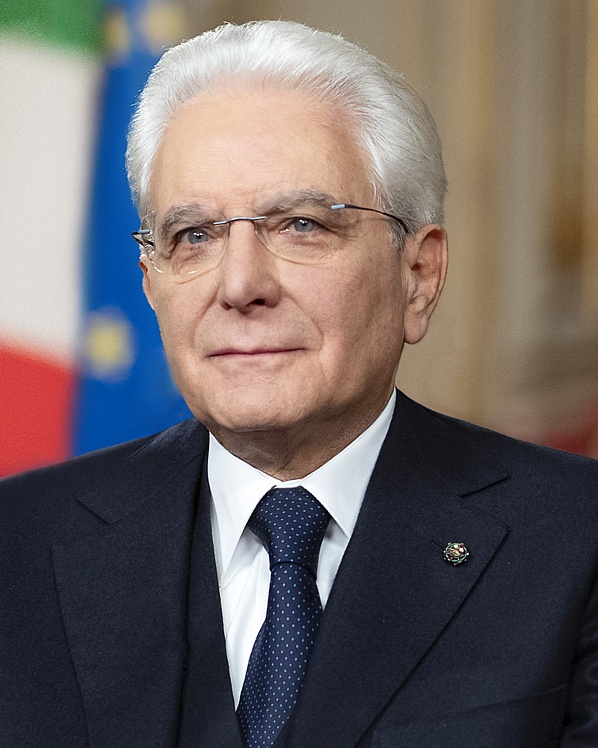
President Sergio Mattarella is the most recent person to have opened a Winter Olympic Games (in Italy, 2026).

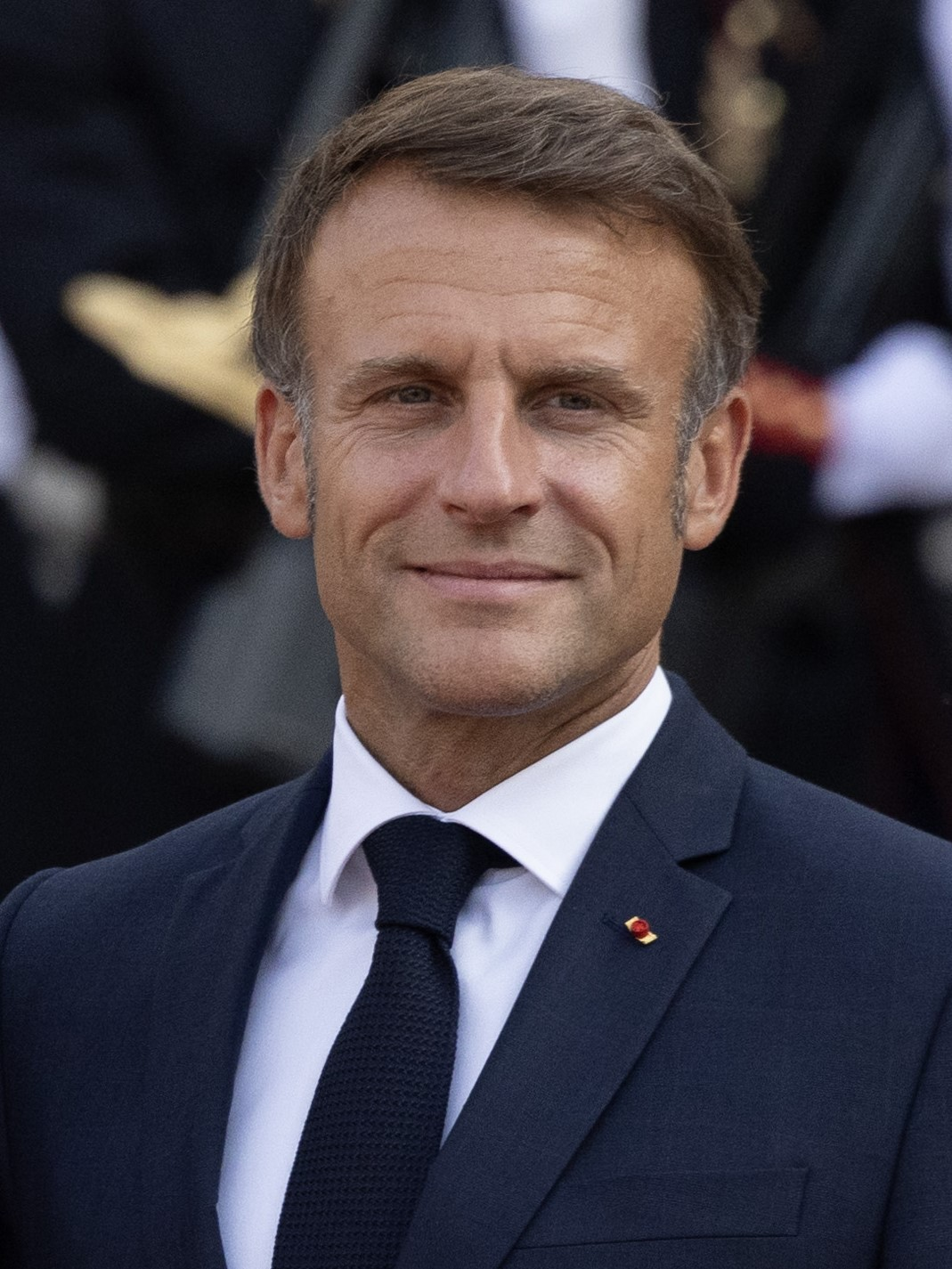
President Emmanuel Macron is the most recent person to have opened a Summer Olympic Games (in Paris, 2024).

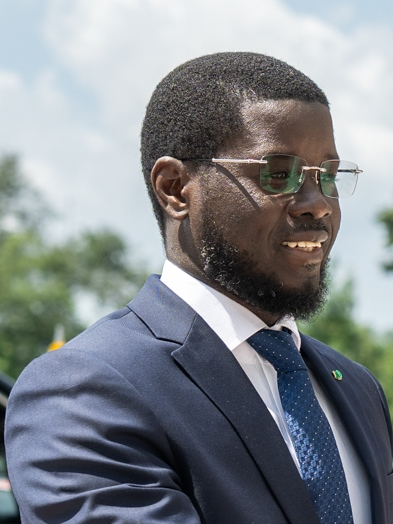
President Bassirou Diomaye Faye is the most recent person to have opened a Youth Olympic Games (in Dakar, 2026).

The Olympic Games are an international multi-sport event featuring both summer and winter sports, held every two years with Summer and Winter Olympic Games alternating. During Olympic Games opening ceremonies, the sitting president of the International Olympic Committee (IOC) will make a speech before inviting a representative from the host country to officially declare that particular Games open. The current Olympic Charter requires this person to be the head of state of the host country, although this has not always been the case. This article lists the people who have had the ceremonial duty to declare each Olympic Games open.

== Opening ceremony ==
The IOC factsheet on the opening ceremony states: "According to the Olympic Charter protocol, the duty of declaring the Games officially open falls to the head of state of the host country. Those who have performed this task are royalty and presidents, or their representatives, whether it was a vice-president, a member of the royal family, or a governor-general". Rule 56 of Chapter 5 of the Olympic Charter sets out the exact words that are to be declared by the person opening the Games. If at a Summer Olympic Games, the words to be said are:

I declare open the Games of [name of the host city], celebrating the [ordinal number of the Olympiad] Olympiad of the modern era.

When at a Winter Olympic Games, the dignitary opening the Games is to proclaim:

I declare open the [number of the Olympic Winter Games] Olympic Winter Games of [name of the host city].

However, this has not always been followed strictly;

On 4 February 1932, Governor of New York State Franklin D. Roosevelt opened the Lake Placid Winter Olympics with a short speech:

"I welcome you, the representatives of many of our sister nations, to this the opening of the third Winter Olympic Games."

On 30 July 1932, US vice president Charles Curtis opened the Los Angeles Summer Olympics with:

"In the name of the president of the United States, I proclaim open the Olympic Games of Los Angeles, celebrating the tenth Olympiad of the modern era."

On 6 February 1936, Adolf Hitler, Führer and Chancellor of Germany, opened the Winter Games in Garmisch-Partenkirchen by saying in German:

German: "Ich erkläre die vierten Olympischen Winterspiele neunzehnhundert und sechsunddreißig in Garmisch-Partenkirchen für eröffnet.", lit. 'I declare the fourth Winter Olympic Games of 1936 in Garmisch-Partenkirchen open.'

On 1 August 1936, Hitler opened the Summer Games in Berlin by saying in German:

German: "Ich verkünde die Spiele von Berlin zur Feier der elfte Olympiade neuer Zeitrechnung als eröffnet.", lit. 'I proclaim the Berlin Games, celebrating the eleventh Olympiad of the new era, open!.'

On 29 July 1948, King George VI of the United Kingdom and Northern Ireland, opened the Olympic Games of London by saying:

"I proclaim open the Olympic Games of London, celebrating the XIV Olympiad of the modern era."

On 14 February 1952, Princess Ragnhild, in place of his grandfather King Haakon VII of Norway and father Crown Prince Olav who were in London for the state funeral of King George VI, opened the Olympic Winter Games in Oslo by speaking in Norwegian:

Bokmål: Jeg erklærer åpnet den sjette olympiske vinterleker med nitten hundre femti-to i Oslo til feiring av den femtende olympiaden i moderne tid., lit. 'I declare open the VI Olympic Winter Games of nineteen hundred fifty-two in Oslo in celebration of the 15th Olympiad of the modern era.' (Note: The "15th" was counting the upcoming Summer Games, which was the 15th Olympiad.)

On 19 July 1952, Juho Kusti Paasikivi, President of Finland, opened the Olympic Games on Helsinki in Finnish and English:

Finnish: Julistan nykyajan viidennettoista olympiakisat Helsingissä avatuiksi., lit. 'I declare the XV modern Olympic Games in Helsinki open.'

English: "I declare open the Olympic Games of Helsinki, celebrating the XV Olympiad of the modern era."

On 26 February 1956, Giovanni Gronchi, President of the Italian Republic, declares the Winter Olympics in Cortina d'Ampezzo open by speaking in Italian:

Italian: Dichiaro aperti i settimi Giuochi invernali di Cortina d'Ampezzo, celebranti la sedicesima Olimpiade dell'era moderna., lit. 'I declare open the seventh Winter Games in Cortina d'Ampezzo, celebrating the sixteenth Olympiad of the modern era.' (Note: The "16th" was counting the upcoming Summer Games, which was the 16th Olympiad.)

On 22 November 1956, the Duke of Edinburgh opened the Games of Melbourne by saying:

"I declare open the Olympic Games of Melbourne, celebrating the XVI Olympiad of the modern era."

On 18 February 1960, US vice president Richard Nixon, opened the Squaw Valley Winter Games with:

"I now declare open the Olympic Winter Games of Squaw Valley, celebrating the VIII Winter Games."

On 27 August 1960, Giovanni Gronchi, President of the Italian Republic, declares the Summer Olympics in Rome open by speaking in Italian:

Italian: Proclamo l'apertura dei Giochi Olimpici di Roma, celebranti la diciassettesima Olimpiade dell'era moderna., lit. 'I proclaim the opening of the Olympic Games of Rome, celebrating the XVII Olympiad of the modern era.'

On 29 January 1964, Austrian president Adolf Schärf opened the Innsbruck Winter Games by speaking in Austrian German:

Austrian German: "Ich erkläre die neunte Olympischen Winterspiele Innsbruck neunzehn und vierundsechzig für eröffnet.", lit. 'I declare the IX Winter Olympic Games Innsbruck 1964 open.'

On 10 October 1964, Emperor Hirohito of Japan, opened the Summer Olympics in Tokyo by speaking in Japanese:

第十八回近代オリンピアードを祝い、ここにオリンピック東京大会の開会を宣言します。 (Dai jūhakkai kindai orinpiādo iwai, koko ni orinpikku Tōkyō taikai no kaikai o sengen shimasu., Celebrating the XVIII modern Olympiad, (I) hereby declare the opening of the Tokyo Olympic Games.)

On 6 February 1968, Charles de Gaulle, President of the French Republic, declares the opening of the Grenoble Winter Olympics by speaking in French:

French: Je proclame l'ouverture des dixième Jeux olympiques d'hiver de Grenoble., lit. 'I proclaim open the tenth Olympic Winter Games of Grenoble.'

On 12 October 1968, Mexican president Gustavo Díaz Ordaz opened the Games of Mexico City in Spanish:

Spanish: Hoy, doce de octubre de mil novecientos sesenta y ocho, declaro inaugurados los Juegos Olímpicos de México, que conmemoran la decimanovena Olimpiada de la era moderna, lit. 'Today, 12 October 1968, (I) declare open the Olympic Games in Mexico, which commemorate the XIX Olympiad of the modern era.'

On 3 February 1972, Emperor Hirohito of Japan opened the Olympic Winter Games in Sapporo by speaking in Japanese:

わたくしここに第十一回冬季オリンピック札幌大会の開会の宣言をします。 (Watakushi wa koko ni dai jūikkai tōki orinpikku Sapporo taikai no kaikai no sengen o shimasu., I hereby declare the opening of the 11th Winter Olympic Games in Sapporo.)

On 26 August 1972, German president Gustav Heinemann opened the Games of Munich by speaking in German:

German: "Ich erkläre die Olympischen Spiele München neunzehn und zweiundsiebzig, zur feier der zwanzigsten Olympiade der neuzeit, für eröffnet.", lit. 'I declare the Munich 1972 Olympic Games, celebrating the XX Olympiad of the modern era, open.'

On 4 February 1976, Austrian president Rudolf Kirchschläger opened the Innsbruck Winter Games by speaking in Austrian German:

Austrian German: "Ich erkläre die zwölften Olympischen Winterspiele Innsbruck neunzehn und sechsundsiebzig für eröffnet.", lit. 'I declare the 12th Winter Olympic Games Innsbruck 1976 open.'

On 17 July 1976, Elizabeth II, as Queen of Canada, opened the Montreal Olympics (first in French followed by the English) :

French: "Je proclame l'ouverture des Jeux olympiques de mille neuf cent soixante-seize, célébrant la vingt et unième olympiade de l'ère moderne."

English: "I declare open the Olympic Games of 1976, celebrating the XXI Olympiad of the modern era."

On 11 February 1980, US vice president Walter Mondale opened the Lake Placid Winter Games with:

"On behalf of the president of the United States and the American people, I am pleased to declare officially the opening of the 13th Winter Olympics, held this year at Lake Placid."

On 19 July 1980, Leonid Brezhnev, as General Secretary of the Communist Party and Chairman of the Presidium of the Supreme Soviet of the Soviet Union, (Note: IOC records state Brezhnev opened the Moscow Games as "President", a title used at that time by the Chairman of the Presidium of the Supreme Soviet, or de jure head of state. (The office of President of the Soviet Union was not created until 1990, a year before the nation broke up.) Though Brezhnev was de facto ruler serving as the General Secretary of the Communist Party, that title is not reflected in IOC records.) opened the Moscow Summer Olympics by speaking in Russian:

Russian: Уважаемый господин президент Международного олимпийского комитета! Спортсмены мира! Уважаемые гости! Товарищи! Я объявляю Олимпийские игры тысяча девятьсот восемьдесят года, знаменующие двадцать второй Олимпиаду современной эры, открытыми!, romanized: Uvazhayemyy gospodin prezident Mezhdunarodnogo olimpiyskogo komiteta! Sportsmeny mira! Uvazhayemyye gosti! Tovarishchi! YA ob"yavlyayu Olimpiyskiye igry tysyacha devyat'sot vosem'desyat goda, znamenuyushchiye dvadtsat' vtoroy Olimpiadu sovremennoy ery, otkrytymi!, lit. 'Dear Mr. President of the International Olympic Committee! Sportsmen of the world! Dear guests! Comrades! I declare the 1980 Olympic Games, marking the XXII Olympiad of the modern era, open!'

On 8 February 1984, Mika Špiljak, the president of Yugoslavia opened the Sarajevo Winter Olympics by speaking in Serbian:

Serbian: Проглашавам да су четрнаесте зимске олимпијске игре у Сарајеву отворене, romanized: Proglašavam da su četrnaeste zimske olimpijske igre u Sarajevu otvorene, lit. 'I declare the 14th Winter Olympic Games in Sarajevo open.'

On 28 July 1984, US president Ronald Reagan opened the Los Angeles Summer Olympics with:

"Celebrating the XXIII Olympiad of the modern era, I declare open the Olympic Games of Los Angeles."

On 13 February 1988, Jeanne Sauvé, the Governor General of Canada, opened the 1988 Winter Olympics in Calgary using the format of the Summer Games declaration by saying in French and English:

French: "Je proclame l'ouverture de Jeux Olympiques de Calgary, célébrant les quinzième Jeux olympiques d'hiver."

English: "I declare open the Games of Calgary, celebrating the XV Olympic Games." (Note: Sauvé failed to say "Winter" in English.)

On 17 September 1988, Roh Tae-woo, President of the Republic of Korea, opened the Summer Olympics in Seoul by speaking in Korean:

Korean: "나는 제이십사회 근대 올림픽 대회를 경축하면서, 서울 올림픽 대회를 개최하는 것을 선언합니다."; Hanja: "나는 第二十四회 近代 올림픽 大會를 慶祝하면서, 서울 올림픽 大會를 開催하는 것을 宣言합니다."; RR: "naneun jeisibsahoe geundae Ollimpig daehoeleul gyeongchughamyeonseo, Seoul Ollimpig daehoeleul gaechoehaneun geos-eul seoneonhamnida"; MR: "nanŭn cheisipsahoe kŭndae Ollimp'ik taehoerŭl kyŏngch'ukhamyŏnsŏ, Sŏul Ollimp'ik taehoerŭl kaech'oehanŭn kŏsŭl sŏnŏnhamnida."; lit. '"I, celebrating the XXIV Modern Olympic Games, I declare the Seoul Olympic Games open."'

On 8 February 1992, François Mitterrand, President of the French Republic, declares the opening of the Albertville Winter Olympics by speaking in French:

French: Je proclame ouverture de Jeux Olympiques de Albertville, célébrant les seizièmes Jeux olympiques d'hiver., lit. 'I proclaim open the Games of Albertville, celebrating the XVI Olympic Winter Games.'

On 25 July 1992, King Juan Carlos I of Spain opened the Barcelona Summer Olympics by saying:

Catalan: Benvinguts tots a Barcelona., lit. 'Welcome all to Barcelona.'

Spanish: Hoy, veinticinco de julio del año mil novecientos noventa y dos, declaro abiertos los Juegos Olímpicos de Barcelona que celebran la vigésimo quinta Olimpiada de la era moderna., lit. 'Today, 25 July of year 1992, (I) declare open the Barcelona Olympic Games which celebrate the XXV Olympiad of the modern era.'

On 12 February 1994, King Harald V of Norway opened the Olympic Winter Games in Lillehammer by speaking in Norwegian:

Bokmål: Jeg erklærer herved de syttende olympiske vinterleker i Lillehammer for åpne., lit. 'I hereby declare the XVII Olympic Winter Games in Lillehammer open.'

On 19 July 1996, US president Bill Clinton opened the Atlanta Summer Olympics with the exact format:

"I declare open the Games of Atlanta, celebrating the XXVI Olympiad of the modern era."

On 7 February 1998, Emperor Akihito of Japan opened the Olympic Winter Games in Nagano by speaking in Japanese:

ここに、長野における第十八回オリンピッ冬季競技大会の開会を宣言します。 (Koko ni, Nagano ni okeru dai jūhakkai orinpik tōkikyōgitaikai no kaikai o sengen shimasu., Here, I declare open the XVIII Olympic Winter Games in Nagano.)

On 15 September 2000, Governor-General of the Commonwealth of Australia Sir William Deane opened the Sydney Summer Olympics with the exact format:

"I declare open the Games of Sydney, celebrating the XXVII Olympiad of the modern era."

On 8 February 2002, US president George W. Bush opened the Winter Olympics in Salt Lake City, which took place five months after the September 11 attacks using a tweak of the Summer Games declaration with:

"On behalf of a proud, determined and grateful nation, I declare open the Games of Salt Lake City, celebrating the Olympic Winter Games."

On 13 August 2004, Konstantinos Stephanopoulos, President of the Hellenic Republic, opened the Athens Summer Olympics, by speaking in Greek:

Greek: Κηρύσσω την έναρξη των Ολυμπιακών Αγώνων της Αθήνας... και τον εορτασμό της εικοστις όγδοις Ολυμπιάδος της σύγχρονης εποχής., romanized: Kirýsso tin énarxi ton Olympiakón Agónon tis Athínas... kai ton eortasmó tis eikostis ógdois Olympiádos tis sýnchronis epochís., lit. 'I declare the opening of the Olympic Games of Athens... and the celebration of the XXVIII Olympiad of the modern era.'

On 10 February 2006, Carlo Azeglio Ciampi, President of the Italian Republic, opened the Turin Olympic Winter Games using the format of the Summer Games declaration by speaking in Italian:

Italian: Dichiaro aperta a Torino la celebrazione dei ventesimi Giochi Olimpici Invernali., lit. 'I declare open in Turin, the celebration of the XX Winter Olympic Games.'

On 8 August 2008, Hu Jintao, as General Secretary of the Chinese Communist Party and President of China, opened the Beijing Summer Olympics by saying:

Chinese: "我宣布，北京第二十九届奥林匹克运动会…开幕！"; pinyin: Wǒ xuānbù, běijīng dì èrshíjiǔ jiè àolínpǐkè yùndònghuì…kāimù!; lit. 'I declare the XXIX Olympic Games of Beijing... open!'

On 12 February 2010, Governor General of Canada Michaëlle Jean opened the 2010 Winter Olympics in Vancouver using the format of the Summer Games declaration by saying in French and English:

French: "Je proclame ouverts les Jeux de Vancouver, célébrant les vingt et unième Jeux olympiques d'hiver."

English: "I declare open the Games of Vancouver, celebrating the XXI Olympic Winter Games."

On 27 July 2012, Queen Elizabeth II of the United Kingdom of Great Britain and Northern Ireland, declared the opening of the London Summer Olympics with the exact format:

"I declare open the Games of London, celebrating the XXX Olympiad of the modern era."

On 7 February 2014, Vladimir Putin, the President of the Russian Federation, declares the opening of the 2014 Sochi Winter Olympics by saying:

Russian: Двадцать второй зимние Олимпийские игры в Сочи объявляю открытыми., romanized: Dvadtsat' vtoroy zimniye Olimpiyskiye igry v Sochi obyavlyayu otkrytymi., lit. 'The XXII Olympic Winter Games in Sochi, I declare it open.'

On 5 August 2016, Vice President of the Federative Republic of Brazil Michel Temer, as acting president during the suspension of President Dilma Rousseff's powers and duties, opened the Summer Olympics in Rio de Janeiro by speaking in Brazilian Portuguese:

Brazilian Portuguese: Após este maravilhoso espetáculo, declaro abertos os Jogos Olímpicos do Rio, celebrando a trigésima primeira Olimpíada da era moderna, lit. 'After this wonderful spectacle, I declare open the Rio Olympic Games, celebrating the XXXI Olympiad of the modern era.'

On 9 February 2018, Moon Jae-in, President of the Republic of Korea, declares the opening of the Pyeongchang Winter Olympics by speaking in Korean:

Korean: "제이십삼회 동계올림픽대회인 평창 동계올림픽대회의 개회를 선언합니다."; Hanja: "第二十三回 冬季올림픽大會인 平昌 冬季올림픽大會의 開會를 宣言합니다"; RR: "Je isibsam-hoe Donggyeollimpikdaehoe-in Pyeongchang Donggyeollimpikdaehoe-ui gaehoereul seoneonhamnida"; MR: "Che 23-hoe Tonggyeollimp'iktaehoe-in P'yŏngch'ang Tonggyeollimp'iktaehoe-ŭi kaehoe-rŭl sŏnŏnhamnida."; lit. '"The XXIII Winter Olympic Games, the PyeongChang Winter Olympic Games, I declare it open."'

On 23 July 2021, Emperor Naruhito opened the 2020 Summer Olympics in Tokyo (which was postponed by a year due to the COVID-19 pandemic), by speaking in Japanese:

わたくしはここに第三十二回近代オリンピアード記念する、東京大会の開会を宣言します。 (Watakushi wa koko ni dai san jū ni-kai kindai orinpi ādo kinen suru, Tōkyō taikai no kaikai o sengen shimasu., I hereby declare the opening of the Tokyo Games, commemorating the XXXII Modern Olympiad.)

On 4 February 2022, Xi Jinping, as General Secretary of the Chinese Communist Party and President of China, opened the Beijing Winter Olympics by saying:

Chinese: "我宣布，北京第二十四届冬季奥林匹克运动会…开幕！"; pinyin: Wǒ xuānbù, běijīng dì èrshísì jiè dōngjì àolínpǐkè yùndònghuì…kāimù!; lit. 'I declare the XXIV Winter Olympic Games of Beijing... open!'

On 26 July 2024, Emmanuel Macron, President of the French Republic, declares the opening of the Paris Summer Olympics by speaking in French:

French: Je proclame ouverts les Jeux de Paris, célébrant la trente-troisième olympiade des temps modernes, lit. 'I proclaim open the Games of Paris, celebrating the XXXIII Olympiad of the modern times.'

On 6 February 2026, Sergio Mattarella, President of the Italian Republic, declares the opening of the Milano Cortina Winter Olympics by speaking in Italian:

Italian: Dichiaro aperta la celebrazione della quindicesima (Note: Mattarella erroneously indicated the XV edition of the Games in the formula, instead of the XXV (venticinquesima)) edizione dei Giochi olimpici invernali di Milano Cortina., lit. 'I declare open the celebration of the XV (sic) Winter Olympic Games of Milano Cortina.'

== Records ==
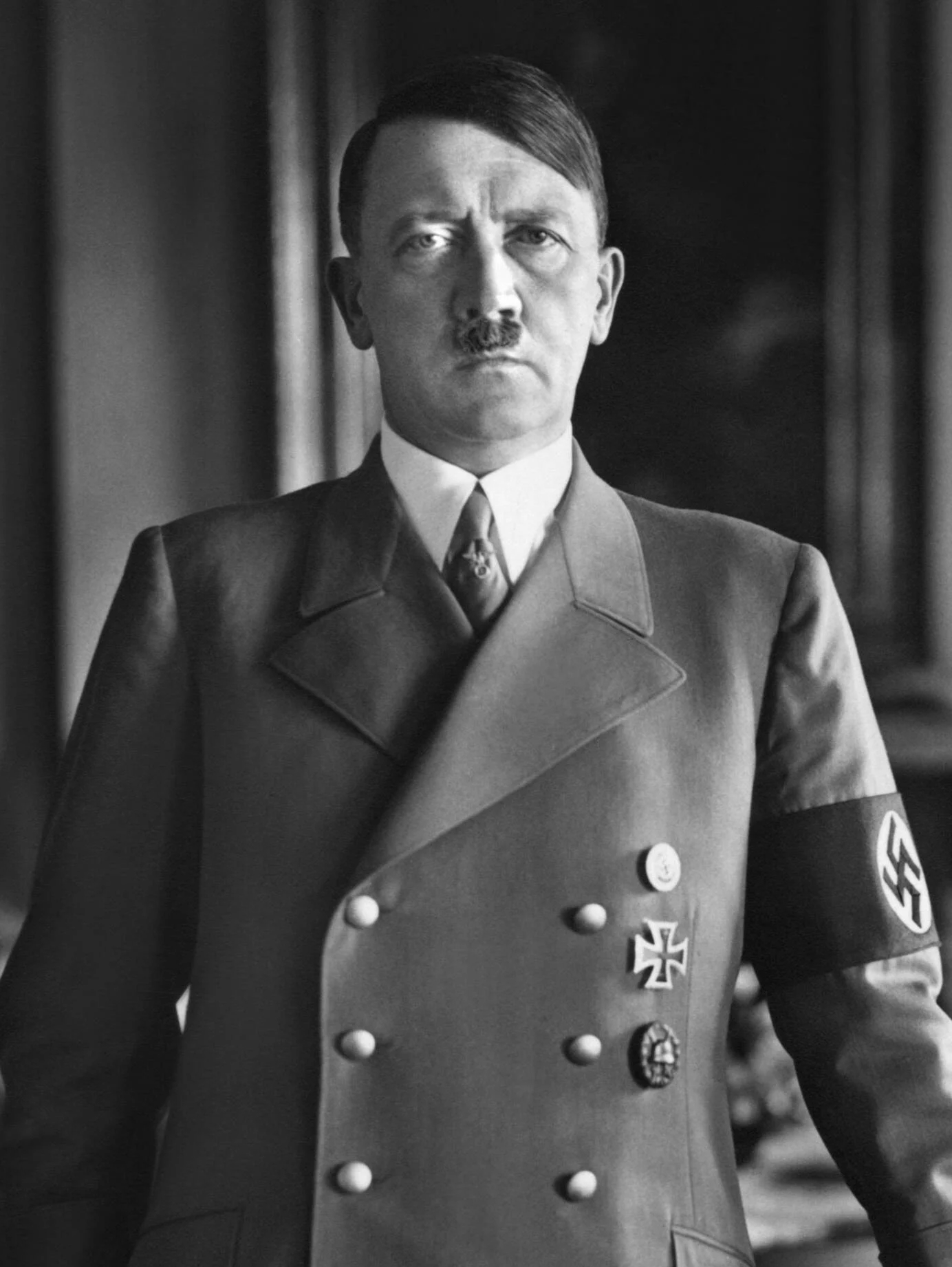
Adolf Hitler

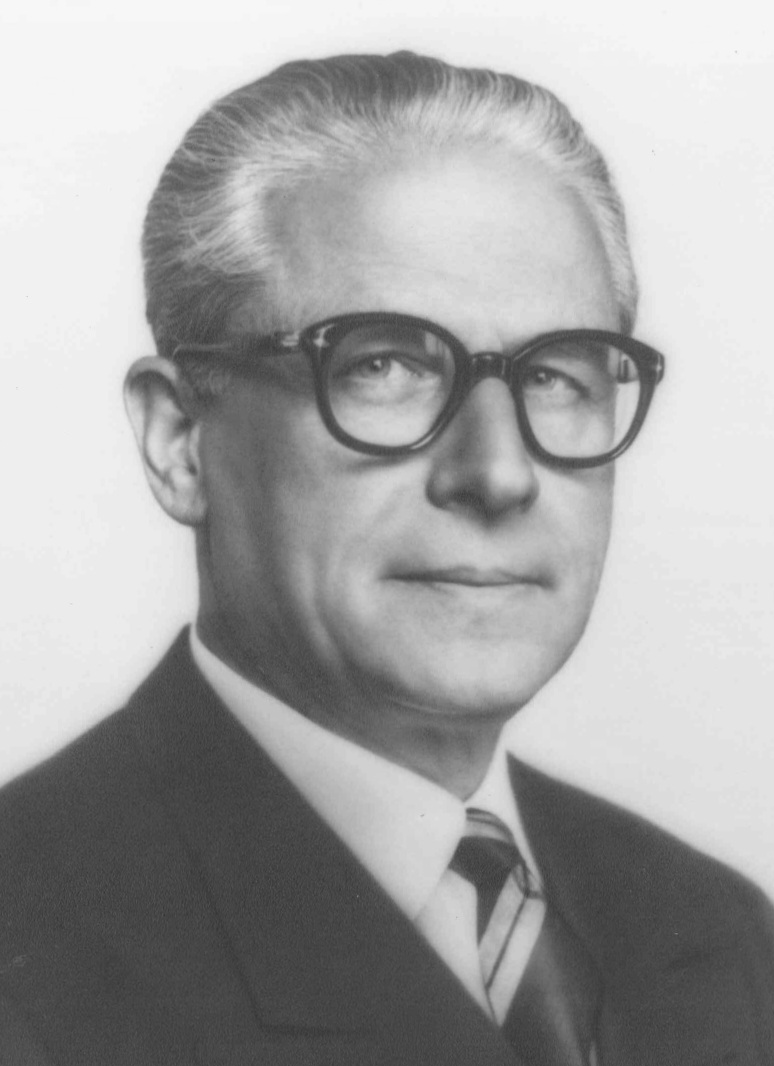
Giovanni Gronchi

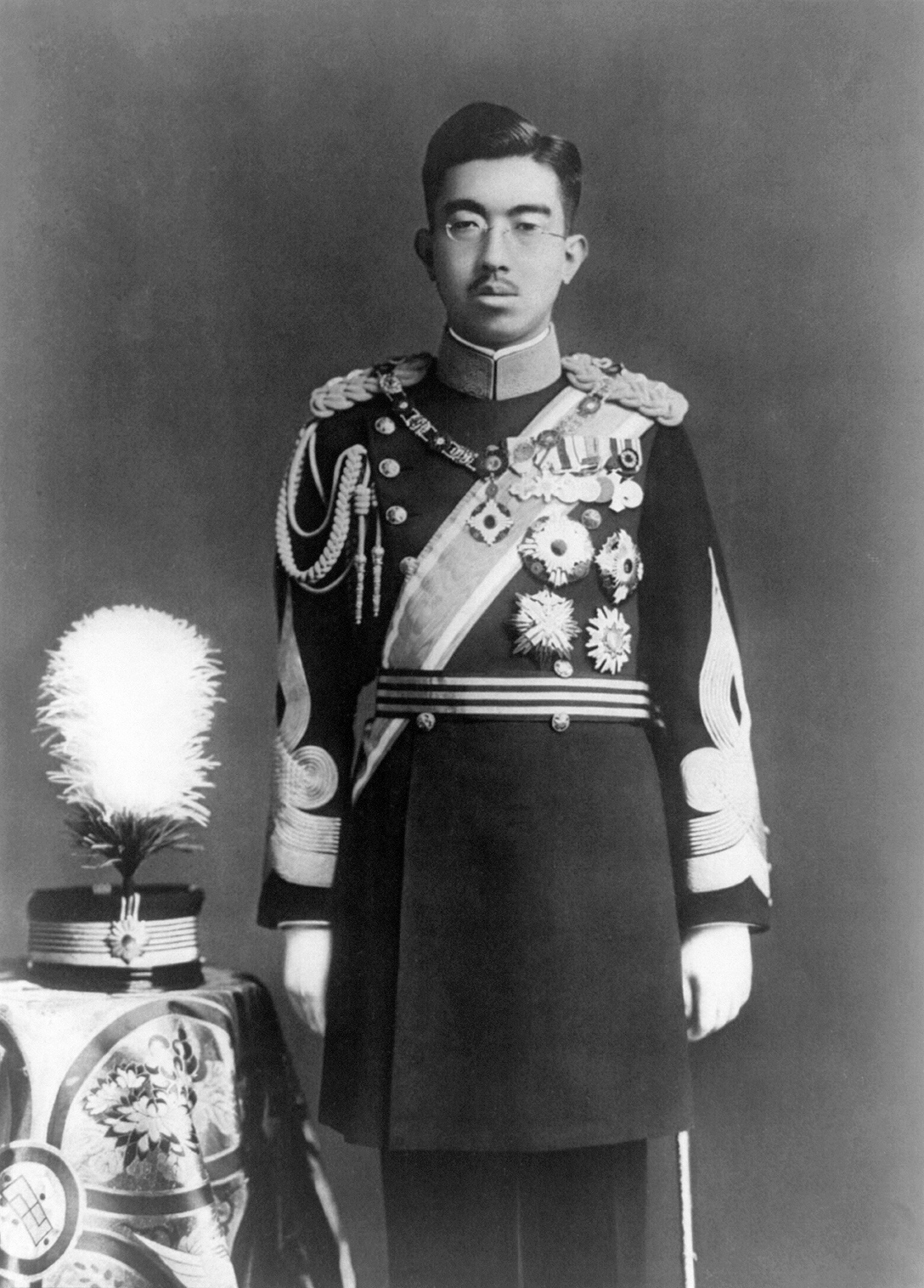
Hirohito

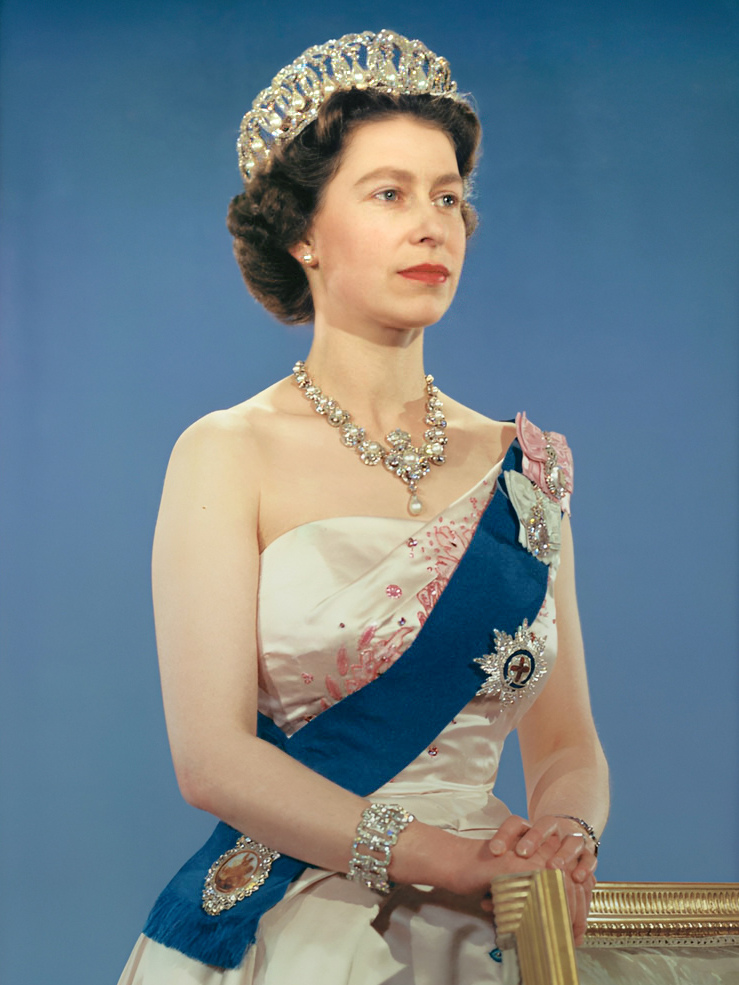
Elizabeth II

As of 2026, there have been 51 different individuals who opened either the Summer or Winter Olympic Games. Four of them have done so more than once. German führer Adolf Hitler was the first person to open more than one Olympic Games; he opened the 1936 Winter and Summer Olympics, both of which were hosted in Germany. He remains the only one to open more than one Games in the same year.

Italian president Giovanni Gronchi opened the 1956 Winter Olympics in Cortina d'Ampezzo and the 1960 Summer Olympics in Rome. He was the first democratically elected—albeit by the parliament—head of state to open more than one Olympic Games.

Japanese emperor Hirohito opened the 1964 Summer Olympics in Tokyo and the 1972 Winter Olympics in Sapporo. He was the first non-European to open more than one Olympic Games.

The first woman to open any Olympic Games was Princess Ragnhild of Norway in 1952, in place of her grandfather King Haakon VII of Norway and father Crown Prince Olav who were in London for the state funeral of British King George VI. Aged 21, she was also the youngest person to have opened the Olympic Games. Queen Elizabeth II, who was King George VI's eldest daughter and successor, opened the 1976 Summer Olympics in Montreal, Canada, and the 2012 Summer Olympics in London, Great Britain. The first and only head of state to open the Summer Games more than once, she was also the only woman to open any Summer Olympics as of 2024, and the only one to do so in different host countries. Aside from declaring open the Games by herself, she was represented during the declaration four times: in the 1956 and 2000 Summer Olympics which were held in Australia, as well as the 1988 and 2010 Winter Olympics, which were held in Canada. In 1988 and 2010, the Queen were represented by the sitting Canadian governor general, which happened to be female on both occasions—Jeanne Sauvé in 1988 and Michaëlle Jean in 2010. This made Canada the only country whose Olympic Games have been opened only by women. Jean also became the first Black person to open any Olympic Games.

Norwegian King Harald V became the first person to open both the regular Olympics and Youth Olympics, having opened the 1994 Winter and 2016 Winter Youth Games. He was followed by Chinese leader Xi Jinping, who opened the 2014 Summer Youth and 2022 Winter Games.

King Juan Carlos I of Spain, who competed in the 1972 Summer Olympics, was the first Olympic athlete to open the Summer Olympic Games in 1992. The second was King Harald V of Norway, who competed in the 1964, 1968, and 1972 Summer Olympics and opened the 1994 Winter Olympics.

== Dignitaries who have opened the Summer Olympics ==
Year	Games	Host city	Host country	Officially opened by (Note: Names & offices in italics reflect an opener who was not head of state when opening the Games. If the office is partially italicized, the non-italicized portion is the office & name of the head of state being represented.)	Office of opener	Notes
1896	I Olympiad	Athens	Kingdom of Greece	George I	King of the Hellenes	
1900	II Olympiad	Paris	France	No official opening	No official opening	
1904	III Olympiad	St. Louis	United States	David R. Francis	President of the Louisiana Purchase Exposition (Note: Representing President Theodore Roosevelt.)	
1908	IV Olympiad	London	United Kingdom	Edward VII	King of the United Kingdom	
1912	V Olympiad	Stockholm	Sweden	Gustaf V	King of Sweden	
1920	VII Olympiad	Antwerp	Belgium	Albert I	King of the Belgians	
1924	VIII Olympiad	Paris	France	Gaston Doumergue	President of the French Republic	
1928	IX Olympiad	Amsterdam	Netherlands	Prince Hendrik	Prince Consort of the Netherlands (Note: Representing his wife, Queen Wilhelmina of the Netherlands.)	
1932	X Olympiad	Los Angeles	United States	Charles Curtis	Vice President of the United States (Note: Representing President Herbert Hoover.)	
1936	XI Olympiad	Berlin	Nazi Germany	Adolf Hitler	Chancellor of the German Reich (Note: IOC records state Hitler opened these Games as "Chancellor" (head of government), but in 1934 that office was consolidated with "President" (head of state) into "Führer und Reichskanzler", or "Führer".)	
1948	XIV Olympiad	London	United Kingdom	George VI	King of the United Kingdom	
1952	XV Olympiad	Helsinki	Finland	Juho Kusti Paasikivi	President of the Republic of Finland	
1956	XVI Olympiad	Melbourne	Australia	Philip, Duke of Edinburgh	Consort of the Queen of Australia (Note: Representing his wife, Elizabeth II, Queen of Australia.)	
1956	XVI Olympiad (equestrian)	Stockholm	Sweden	Gustaf VI Adolf	King of Sweden	
1960	XVII Olympiad	Rome	Italy	Giovanni Gronchi	President of the Italian Republic	
1964	XVIII Olympiad	Tokyo	Japan	Hirohito	Emperor of Japan	
1968	XIX Olympiad	Mexico City	Mexico	Gustavo Díaz Ordaz	President of the United Mexican States	
1972	XX Olympiad	Munich	West Germany	Gustav Heinemann	Federal President of the Federal Republic of Germany	
1976	XXI Olympiad	Montreal	Canada	Elizabeth II	Queen of Canada	
1980	XXII Olympiad	Moscow	Soviet Union	Leonid Brezhnev	Chairman of the Presidium of the Supreme Soviet of the Soviet Union (Note: IOC records state Brezhnev opened the Moscow Games as "President", a title used at that time by the Chairman of the Presidium of the Supreme Soviet, or de jure head of state. (The office of President of the Soviet Union was not created until 1990, a year before the nation broke up.) Though Brezhnev was also de facto ruler as General Secretary of the Communist Party, that title is not reflected in IOC records.)	
1984	XXIII Olympiad	Los Angeles	United States	Ronald Reagan	President of the United States	
1988	XXIV Olympiad	Seoul	South Korea	Roh Tae-woo	President of the Republic of Korea	
1992	XXV Olympiad	Barcelona	Spain	Juan Carlos I	King of Spain	
1996	XXVI Olympiad	Atlanta	United States	Bill Clinton	President of the United States	
2000	XXVII Olympiad	Sydney	Australia	William Deane	Governor-General of the Commonwealth of Australia (Note: Representing Elizabeth II, Queen of Australia.)	
2004	XXVIII Olympiad	Athens	Greece	Konstantinos Stephanopoulos	President of the Hellenic Republic	
2008	XXIX Olympiad	Beijing	China	Hu Jintao	President of China (Note: IOC records state Hu Jintao opened the Beijing Games as "President", de jure state representative. Though Hu was also de facto ruler as General Secretary of the Chinese Communist Party, that title is not reflected in IOC records.)	
2012	XXX Olympiad	London	United Kingdom	Elizabeth II	Queen of the United Kingdom	
2016	XXXI Olympiad	Rio de Janeiro	Brazil	Michel Temer	Vice President of the Federative Republic of Brazil (Note: As acting president, discharging the powers and duties of the office of President of the Federative Republic of Brazil in place of incumbent President Dilma Rousseff, who was suspended from her duties as President during her impeachment trial.)	
2020 (Note: Held in 2021, the 2020 Summer Olympics were delayed by a year due to the then-ongoing worldwide COVID-19 pandemic.)	XXXII Olympiad	Tokyo	Japan	Naruhito	Emperor of Japan	
2024	XXXIII Olympiad	Paris	France	Emmanuel Macron	President of the French Republic	
2028	XXXIV Olympiad	Los Angeles	United States	Donald Trump (expected)	President of the United States	

== Dignitaries who have opened the Winter Olympics ==
Year	Games	Host city	Host country	Officially opened by (Note: Names & offices in italics reflect an opener who was not head of state when he or she opened the Games. If the office is partially italicized, the non-italicized portion is the office & name of the head of state being represented.)	Office of opener	Notes
1924	I Winter	Chamonix	France	Gaston Vidal	Undersecretary for Physical Education of the French Republic (Note: Representing President Alexandre Millerand.)	
1928	II Winter	St. Moritz	Switzerland	Edmund Schulthess	President of the Swiss Confederation (Note: This office is technically not head of state in and of itself, but is the presiding officer of the Federal Council which collectively acts as head of state.)	
1932	III Winter	Lake Placid	United States	Franklin D. Roosevelt	Governor of the State of New York (Note: Representing President Herbert Hoover.)	
1936	IV Winter	Garmisch-Partenkirchen	Nazi Germany	Adolf Hitler	Chancellor of the German Reich (Note: IOC records state Hitler opened these Games as "Chancellor" (head of government), but in 1934 that office was consolidated with "President" (head of state) into "Führer und Reichskanzler", or "Führer".)	
1948	V Winter	St. Moritz	Switzerland	Enrico Celio	President of the Swiss Confederation	
1952	VI Winter	Oslo	Norway	Princess Ragnhild	Princess of Norway (Note: Representing her grandfather, King Haakon VII of Norway.)	
1956	VII Winter	Cortina d'Ampezzo	Italy	Giovanni Gronchi	President of the Italian Republic	
1960	VIII Winter	Squaw Valley	United States	Richard Nixon	Vice President of the United States (Note: Representing President Dwight D. Eisenhower.)	
1964	IX Winter	Innsbruck	Austria	Adolf Schärf	Federal President of the Republic of Austria	
1968	X Winter	Grenoble	France	Charles de Gaulle	President of the French Republic	
1972	XI Winter	Sapporo	Japan	Hirohito	Emperor of Japan	
1976	XII Winter	Innsbruck	Austria	Rudolf Kirchschläger	Federal President of the Republic of Austria	
1980	XIII Winter	Lake Placid	United States	Walter Mondale	Vice President of the United States (Note: Representing President Jimmy Carter.)	
1984	XIV Winter	Sarajevo	Yugoslavia	Mika Špiljak	President of the Presidency of Yugoslavia	
1988	XV Winter	Calgary	Canada	Jeanne Sauvé	Governor General of Canada (Note: Representing Elizabeth II, Queen of Canada.)	
1992	XVI Winter	Albertville	France	François Mitterrand	President of the French Republic	
1994	XVII Winter	Lillehammer	Norway	Harald V	King of Norway	
1998	XVIII Winter	Nagano	Japan	Akihito	Emperor of Japan	
2002	XIX Winter	Salt Lake City	United States	George W. Bush	President of the United States	
2006	XX Winter	Turin	Italy	Carlo Azeglio Ciampi	President of the Italian Republic	
2010	XXI Winter	Vancouver	Canada	Michaëlle Jean	Governor General of Canada	
2014	XXII Winter	Sochi	Russia	Vladimir Putin	President of the Russian Federation	
2018	XXIII Winter	Pyeongchang	South Korea	Moon Jae-in	President of the Republic of Korea	
2022	XXIV Winter	Beijing	China	Xi Jinping	President of China (Note: IOC records state Xi Jinping opened the Beijing Games as "President", de jure state representative. Though Xi was also de facto ruler as General Secretary of the Chinese Communist Party, that title is not reflected in IOC records.)	
2026	XXV Winter	Milan and Cortina d'Ampezzo	Italy	Sergio Mattarella	President of the Italian Republic	
2030	XXVI Winter	French Alps	France	TBD (expected)	President of the French Republic	
2034	XXVII Winter	Utah	United States	TBD	President of the United States (expected)	

== Dignitaries who have opened the Youth Olympic Games ==
Year	Games	Host city	Host country	Officially opened by	Office of opener	Notes
2010	I Summer	Singapore	Singapore	S. R. Nathan	President of the Republic of Singapore	
2012	I Winter	Innsbruck	Austria	Heinz Fischer	Federal President of the Republic of Austria	
2014	II Summer	Nanjing	China	Xi Jinping	President of China (Note: IOC records state Xi Jinping opened the Nanjing Games as "President", de jure state representative. Though Xi was also de facto ruler as General Secretary of the Chinese Communist Party, that title is not reflected in IOC records.)	
2016	II Winter	Lillehammer	Norway	Harald V	King of Norway	
2018	III Summer	Buenos Aires	Argentina	Mauricio Macri	President of the Argentine Republic	
2020	III Winter	Lausanne	Switzerland	Simonetta Sommaruga	President of the Swiss Confederation (Note: This office is technically not head of state in and of itself, but is the presiding officer of the Federal Council which collectively acts as head of state.)	
2024	IV Winter	Gangwon Province	South Korea	Yoon Suk Yeol	President of the Republic of Korea	
2026	IV Summer	Dakar	Senegal	Bassirou Diomaye Faye	President of the Republic of Senegal	
2028	V Winter	Dolomites and Valtellina	Italy	Sergio Mattarella (expected)	President of the Italian Republic	

== See also ==
- List of Olympic Games host cities
- President of the Organising Committee for the Olympic Games
- President of the International Olympic Committee
