= Johnny Jarrett =

Australian rugby league footballer, and boxer (born 1936)

Personal information
- Nationality: Australian
- Born: John Trevor Patten; 13 June 1936 Sydney, New South Wales, Australia
- Died: 15 April 2020 (aged 83)
- Weight: Bantamweight

Boxing career
- Stance: Orthodox

Boxing record
- Total fights: 46
- Wins: 29
- Win by KO: 24
- Losses: 15
- Draws: 2

John Trevor Patten (13 June 1936 – 15 April 2020), known professionally as Johnny Jarrett, was an Australian Aboriginal elder and community leader, former professional rugby league footballer and professional boxer.

== Biography ==
John Patten was born in 1936 to John Thomas Patten and Selina Patten, née Avery at Sydney in New South Wales and is a descendant of the Yorta Yorta and Bundjalung peoples.

A member of the Stolen Generations, as an infant Patten was taken from his parents at Grafton in northern New South Wales and placed at Bomaderry Aboriginal Children's Home in the south of the state. Following this removal Patten was located by his father and the pair fled from New South Wales, to the safety of Barmah in Victoria, near his father's family at Cummeragunja. Thereafter Patten was educated in Sydney at George Street Primary School and Gardener's Road High School, prior to being enrolled at the newly established Boys' Town (Engadine).

At Boystown, John was educated by Fr Thomas Dunlea and gained expert tuition in boxing from George Simpson and Arthur Daly, and rugby league football by Australian former test player Paddy Maher.

A promising rugby league player in country New South Wales, Patten once scored 100 points in half a season as a halfback and played representative football in 1956 against the touring Maori team from New Zealand. In 1957 Patten was offered a contract by the South Sydney Rabbitohs after having captained South Sydney Presidents Cup team on a tour of country New South Wales. Patten however was already under contract as a professional boxer, and his management team at Sydney Stadium forced Patten to retire from playing football.

Patten boxed professionally under the Jarrett surname as a means of thanking his stepfather Joby Jarrett for his support. As Johnny Jarrett, Patten fought for and obtained the Australian Bantamweight title in December, 1958, defeating Dick White by knockout at Sydney Stadium.

Over the course of his career Patten suffered from a lack of opposition in his own weight division, with a majority of his opponents having come from the higher featherweight division. Financial incentives used to garner interest from rivals in the bantamweight division were unsuccessful. Patten's strong record against featherweights soon also ensured that opportunities among the featherweight division's talent pool would be so costly that Patten would be forced to waive his own share of the profits in order to secure each ensuing bout. This would in time also lead Patten to spend a year in the Philippines in search of opposition and fairer purses.

A lack of action on the domestic scene by way of a title defense saw Patten stripped of the Australian bantamweight title in September 1962.

In the early 1980s Patten was instrumental in the redevelopment of the Pippi Beach Aboriginal community at Yamba in northern New South Wales, ensuring the community had new homes built and access to council amenities they were previously denied.

In 1994 at the age of 58, Patten received qualifications in Small Business Management from Southern Cross University.

Later in life Patten resided in the Blue Mountains of New South Wales with his wife Margaret, whom he married in 1979. There he was an active community member for 20 years prior to the death of his wife, Margaret in 2018, followed by his relocation to an aged care facility in Shepparton.

Patten died from complications arising from dementia on 15 June 2020. He is survived by three sons, five grandsons and a granddaughter.
