= Dumbo Feather =

Australian magazine

- Editor: Kirsty de Garis
- Former editors: Patrick Pittman, Nathan Scolaro
- Categories: Culture
- Frequency: Quarterly
- Format: Mook
- Publisher: Berry Liberman
- Founder: Kate Bezar
- Founded: June 2004
- Final issue Number: 72
- Company: Small Giants
- Country: Australia
- Based in: St Kilda, Victoria
- Language: English
- Website: www.dumbofeather.com
- ISSN: 1838-7012

Dumbo Feather (formerly named Dumbo Feather, pass it on) was a quarterly cultural magazine, published from 2003 to 2023. It was described by its publishers as a mook – half magazine, half book - because it is issued regularly like a magazine, but has the appearance of a book. It was produced in Melbourne, out of Small Giants' offices in St Kilda, Victoria.

== History and profile ==
Dumbo Feather was launched in June 2004 by Kate Bezar, a New Zealander who had originally worked in consulting. After a trip to the newsagent, looking for inspiration, Bezar realised there was no magazine that she really identified with. This catalysed the creation of Dumbo Feather — an interview magazine profiling extraordinary people from around the world.

In 2011, Small Giants (a social enterprise founded by Berry Liberman and Danny Almagor) took over the magazine. It was relaunched with a new team and design.

In each issue, four to five individuals were interviewed in long-form conversations. Past interviewees have included Brene Brown, Esther Perel, Ira Glass, Alain de Botton, Vandana Shiva, Jane Goodall, Krista Tippet, Kate Raworth, Bernard Fanning, Sarah Wilson, David Suzuki, Jimmy Wales, Ray Lawrence, David De Rothschild, Rusty Young, Kirsty Gusmão, Kevin Roberts, Karen Martini, Graeme Murphy, Craig Ruddy, Lisa Gerrard, Jimmy Pham, Sruli Recht, Tenzin Palmo, Sabrina Ward Harrison, Rachael Kohn, Margaret Wertheim, Marcus Westbury, and David Trubridge.

In April 2023, Dumbo Feather published the final edition, issue #72, exploring the theme of ‘Leadership for a hopeful future’. This was the last official magazine under the Dumbo Feather masthead and marked the moment the magazine evolved into a living community of engaged citizens who will continue to create the hopeful future that we all aspire to through the work of Small Giants Academy. The academy is a not-for-profit centre for wisdom and action founded by Berry Liberman and Danny Almagor melding education, storytelling and action labs in service of a more hopeful future.

== References and Notes ==
- Dumbo feather interview at Lovemarks.com
- Interview with Kate Bezar at The Design Files
- Dumbo feather interview with girlwithasatchel blog
