= Shooting at the 1900 Summer Olympics – Men's trap =

Sports shooting at the Olympics

Men's trap at the Games of the II Olympiad
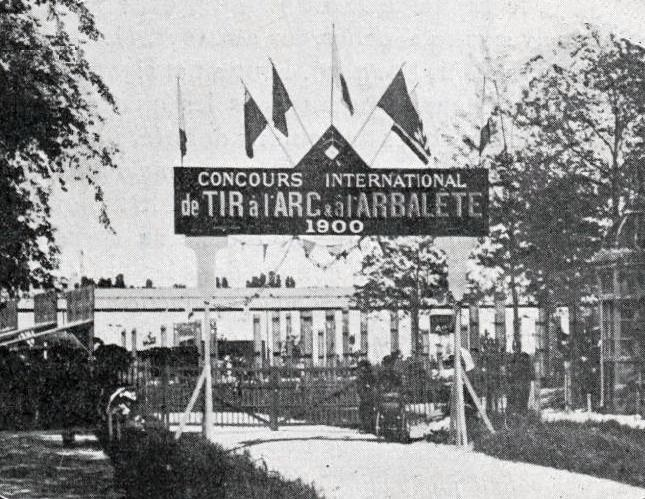
- Entrance to the target stand
- Venue: Satory
- Dates: July 15–17
- Competitors: 31 from 3 nations
- Winning score: 17

Medalists
1st place, gold medalist(s)		Roger de Barbarin; France
2nd place, silver medalist(s)		René Guyot; Belgium
3rd place, bronze medalist(s)		Justinien de Clary; France

The men's ISSF Olympic trap was one of the shooting competitions in the shooting at the 1900 Summer Olympics events in Paris. It was held from Sunday, July 15 to Tuesday, July 17, 1900. Thirty-one athletes from four nations competed. Roger de Barbarin took gold, René Guyot silver, and Justinien de Clary bronze. There was a shoot-off between de Barbarin and Guyot (which the former won 13–12), which de Clary did not compete in despite having scored the same as the other two in the main round.

== Background ==
This was the first appearance of what would become standardised as the men's ISSF Olympic trap event. The event was held at every Summer Olympics from 1896 to 1924 (except 1904, when no shooting events were held) and from 1952 to 2016; it was open to women from 1968 to 1996.

== Competition format ==
Each shooter fired 20 shots, with a point per hit. There was a shoot-off for first place.

== Records ==
Prior to this competition, the existing world and Olympic records were as follows.

World record	
Olympic record	New format

Roger de Barbarin, René Guyot, and Justinien de Clary set the initial Olympic record with 17 points.

== Schedule ==
Date	Time	Round
Sunday, 15 July 1900; Monday, 16 July 1900; Tuesday, 17 July 1900	9:00	Final

== Results ==
Each shooter fired at 20 targets, scoring 1 point for each target hit. Roger de Barbarin beat René Guyot 13 to 12 in a shoot-off. It was not known why Justinien de Clary was not part of that shoot-off, nor are scores beyond 14th place known.

Rank	Shooter	Nation	Score
1st place, gold medalist(s)	Roger de Barbarin	France	17
2nd place, silver medalist(s)	René Guyot	Belgium	17
3rd place, bronze medalist(s)	Justinien de Clary	France	17
4	César de Bettex	France	16
5	Hilaret	France	15
6	Édouard Geynet	France	13
7	Jules Charpentier	France	12
7	Charles de Jaubert	France	12
7	Joseph Labbé	France	12
7	Sidney Merlin	Great Britain	12
7	André de Schonen	France	12
7	Sion	France	12
13	Amédée Aubry	France	11
13	Gheorghe Plagino	Romania	11
15	Maurice Bucquet	France	Unknown
16	Léon Moreaux	France	Unknown
17	Reverdin	France	Unknown
18	Jacques Nivière	France	Unknown
19	Gaston Legrand	France	Unknown
20	Ador	France	Unknown
21	André Mercier	France	Unknown
22	Roger Nivière	France	Unknown
23	Paul de Montholon	France	Unknown
24	de Saint-James	France	Unknown
25	Soucaret	France	Unknown
26	Pierre Perrier	France	Unknown
27	G. Brosselin	France	Unknown
28	Achille Darnis	France	Unknown
29	N. Guyot	France	Unknown
30	Pourchainaux	France	Unknown
31	Anjou	France	Unknown
