= Gaston Legrand =

French sports shooter

Personal information
- Full name: Louis Joseph Gaston Legrand
- Born: 12 July 1851; Paris, France
- Died: 2 March 1905 (aged 53); Paris, France

Sport
- Sport: Sports shooting

Louis Joseph Gaston Legrand (12 July 1851 – 2 March 1905) was a French sports shooter. He competed in the men's trap event at the 1900 Summer Olympics.
