= Dunlea Centre =

Dunlea Centre Boys' Town Engadine

Location
- Engadine, Sydney, New South Wales; Australia; 34°3′53.65″S 151°0′27.50″E

Information
- School type: Non-denominational special school, selective, secondary school
- Religious affiliation: Roman Catholic
- Established: 1 August 1939
- Principal: Samantha Dennis & Joel Hamill (executive director)
- Grades: 3-12
- Enrolment: ~55
- Website: www.dunleacentre.org.au

Dunlea Centre, prior to 2010 known as Boys' Town Engadine, is an Australian residential secondary school for adolescent young people. Its specialised program provides therapeutic support and education to young people who might be experiencing emotional, behavioural and/or social difficulties.

The school is located in the Sydney suburb of Engadine, New South Wales and is run by specialist teachers and social workers.

Dunlea Centre's Primary Program caters to students from Years 3 to 6 (ages 8-12). This is a school-only program (not boarding). Students arrive in the morning and leave in the afternoon just like a regular school program. The program focuses on building academic excellence, emotional well-being, and social skills.

The senior program (years 7-12) is residential in nature, meaning that the young people live on-site at Dunlea Centre Monday to Friday for the duration of the program. (Young people go home on school holidays and public holidays.) There are limited spaces for non-residential day students as well.

The team at Dunlea Centre use the principles of the Teaching-Family Model to teach youth positive behaviours and coping skills, which can be applied to all aspects of a young person’s life.

== History ==
Dunlea Centre, formerly known as Boys' Town Engadine, was founded by Father Thomas Vincent Dunlea, a Roman Catholic priest originally from Ireland.

In 1938, while ministering to homeless families sheltering in the Royal National Park, a dying woman asked Fr Tom, as his parishioners called him, to look after her son. Fr Tom could not say no. After the woman's death, the boy came to live at the presbytery. Within a few months two other boys joined him.

More boys showed up at the presbytery steps needing a home, but the presbytery was too small, so Fr Tom rented a house a few blocks from the presbytery and found a young couple to manage the day to day running of the 'home'. Twenty-seven boys, three dogs, two goats, and a number of chickens came to reside at the property.

The neighbours complained and the health inspector issued a warning to clean up the residence or face eviction. Not wanting his boys to feel the heartbreak of more rejection, Fr Tom decided to take matters into his own hands and called on the news reels and newspapers to come withness his boys march to their new home, a camp they called Boys' Town on the outskirts of the Royal National Park.

Publicity from the news reels and newspapers brought support and donations, which enabled the purchase of a seven acre property in Engadine, just a three kilometre hike from the Boys' Town camp. Boys' Town, Engadine was officially opened 4 May 1941 by New South Wales Premier Alexander Mair. On opening day, Fr Tom stated, that "Boys’ Town is for homeless and friendless boys — it is the hometown; the fair-dinkum town; the town of charity, unity and kindness; it is a smooth landing ground" for boys of every race, colour, and creed.

Boys' Town was to be partly self-supporting and run by the boys themselves with Fr Tom as an overseer of sorts. The goal was to create good citizens by providing the boys with a home, an education, and spiritual and sporting opportunities. As a "town" the boys constituted their own council and conducted their own elections for the positions of mayor, aldermen, health inspectors and other officers.

Boys' Town came to have school rooms, dormitories, a kitchen and dining room, laundry facilities, a chapel, a swimming pool, and even a hospital. In addition, the boys maintained a small farm with livestock, stables, water supply, vegetable gardens and orchard groves. The boys also operated a butchery, leather works, metalwork, blacksmith, foundry, carpentry, woodworks, small brickworks, and a bakery.

In 1942, at Archbishop Cardinal Sir Norman Gilroy's request, the De La Salle Brothers came to help Fr Tom with the growing number of boys at Boys' Town. In 1950 Fr Dunlea resigned his position and travelled Australia, before relocating to Hurstville, New South Wales. In 1952 the Salesians took over for the De La Salle Brothers and remained until 2005.

From the 1960s, as suburbia rapidly encroached and the nearby Engadine retail centre grew, Boys' Town became less of a 'town' and more of a residential school for disadvantaged boys. By the late 1970s the one hundred+ students were mostly boarders with a small percentage of day students attending from the local area. (Prior to 1978 when St John Bosco College was constructed, local boys either attended St Patricks College in Sutherland or Boys' Town in Engadine.) By 1989 the number of boys residing at Boys' Town had dropped to forty. By the early 2000s girls were attending Boys' Town as day students. Boys' Town, Engadine was renamed Dunlea Centre, honouring its founder and reflecting its changing cohort. In 2010 the first girls residential unit was opened. In 2024, Dunlea Centre introduced a primary school program for students in years 3-6, helping younger students to better balance their home, social and educational lives.

== Notable alumni and former staff ==
=== Alumni ===
- Dan Minogue - Australian politician
- Johnny Jarrett - Australian Aboriginal elder and community leader, and former rugby league footballer and professional boxer
- Terry Wright - butcher and businessman
- Ben Lexcen – designer of Australia's victorious (1983) America's Cup yacht.
- John Travers - one of the Anita Cobby killers, sentenced to life imprisonment.
- Ivan Milat – serial killer responsible for the Backpacker Murders
- Robert Parsons - author Madigan Perry's Luck part of lead up to Royal Commission into institutional child abuse.

=== Former staff ===
- Fr Chris Riley, AM – founder of Youth Off the Streets
- Fr Denis Halliday – awarded a PhD posthumously by the Australian Catholic University for his thesis The Strategic Use of the Wellness Model in Adolescent Residential Centres : Implications for Partnership Between Parents and the Centres' in relation to his work with Boys' Town. His book Partners with Families in Crisis helped improve institutional care in Australia.
