= Thomas Dunlea =

Irish-Australian Catholic priest

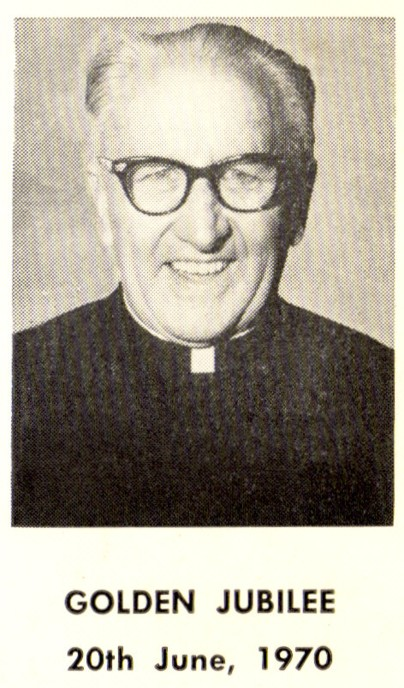

Fr Thomas Vincent Dunlea, OBE (19 April 1894 – 22 August 1970) was an Irish-Australian Catholic priest known for his involvement in charitable works.

== Early life ==
Thomas Dunlea was born in Ballina, Ireland, to Michael and Bridget Dunlea. He attended primary school in Killaloe and High School at Mount St Joseph’s Monastery in Roscrea. In 1914 he entered the College of Mount Melleray, a Cistercian seminary. He was ordained a Roman Catholic priest on 20 June 1920.

== Missionary in Australia ==
In 1920 he set off on the RMS Olympic arriving in Sydney, Australia in December.

Some of his appointments were:

- 1921 Mary Magdalene parish, Rose Bay
- 1922 Surrey Hills
- 1932 Newtown, Enfield, Golden Grove, Hurstville
- 1934 Sutherland
- 1951 Chaplain, Matthew Talbot Hostel for destitute men
- 1952-68 Hurstville

== Founding of Boys' Town ==
In 1938, while ministering to homeless families sheltering in the Royal National Park, a young boy ran up to Fr Tom, as he was known by then, asking him to come to his mother. Father Tom at once went to the woman, who he found desperately ill. She knew her time was near and begged the young priest to care for her son after she died, as she had no one else to leave him with. Fr Tom could not say no.

The woman's son was the first of three boys who came to live at the presbytery. Soon more boys showed up at the presbytery steps needing a home, but the presbytery was much too small, so Father Tom rented a house not too far away where some 27 boys came to live, guided by Father Tom and a live-in married couple.

But the boys outgrew this house as well. The neighbours complained and the health inspector issued a warning to clean up the premises or face eviction. Not wanting his boys to feel the heartbreak of more rejection, Fr Tom decided to take matters into his own hands...

He called on the news reels and newspapers to come witness his boys march to their new home, a camp they called Boys' Town on the outskirts of the Royal National Park. The news spread around the globe. Support and donations poured in. After three months the boys were able to move to a chicken farm just three kilometres from their camp. Boys' Town, Engadine was officially opened 4 May 1941 by New South Wales Premier Alexander Mair.

== Involvement with Alcoholics Anonymous (AA) ==
In the late 1940s Fr Tom was working among alcoholics with Dr Sylvester Minogue and Archibald McKinnon, a psychiatric nurse, of the Darlinghurst Reception House. The pioneer Alcoholics Anonymous group met in the Boys' Town city office, and at other locations found by Fr Tom.

Wanting to provide a home environment for alcoholics during recovery, Fr Tom at the dissent of Dr Minogue and A McKinnon, started a bush camp, as well as a residential home (known as 'Christmas House' because it opened on Christmas Day 1945) for alcoholics. Unfortunately, both collapsed within a year, seemingly proving that a controlled environment was not the answer to alcoholism.

Boys' Town fund-raising functions had sharpened Fr Tom's own drinking problems and he came to recognize that he himself was an alcoholic. In 1950 he took a year's leave of absence to wander around Australia.

On his return, Fr Tom became chaplain to the Matthew Talbot Hostel for destitute men. There his listening kindness was given full stretch. In 1952 he went to Hurstville as parish priest, devoting much of his time to A.A., and a new organization for people with psychiatric problems, Recovery Group, as well as to his usual menagerie of stray animals.

'When Tom Dunlea doesn't take an interest in stray dogs any longer', he said, 'you'll know that he's had it'.

Fr Tom died on 22 August 1970 in Lewisham Hospital. His service at St Mary's Cathedral, Sydney was one of the largest on record. He was buried in Woronora cemetery, but was reinterred a year later outside the doors of the Boys' Town Chapel. The congregation attending his reburial included a pet sheep and a stray dog.

== Recognitions ==
In 1965 Fr Tom was made a Commander of the Order of the British Empire (CBE). He also received the Jewish Cross of Honour and the Papal Cross of Honour Pro Ecclesia et Pontifice.

When Fr. Chris Riley started a detox centre, he named it the Dunlea Adolescent Alcohol and Other Drug Treatment Program.

In 2010 Boys' Town (Engadine) was renamed Dunlea Centre, honouring its founder and reflecting its changing cohort.
