= Dumbrăveni, Vrancea =

Dumbrăveni
- Commune
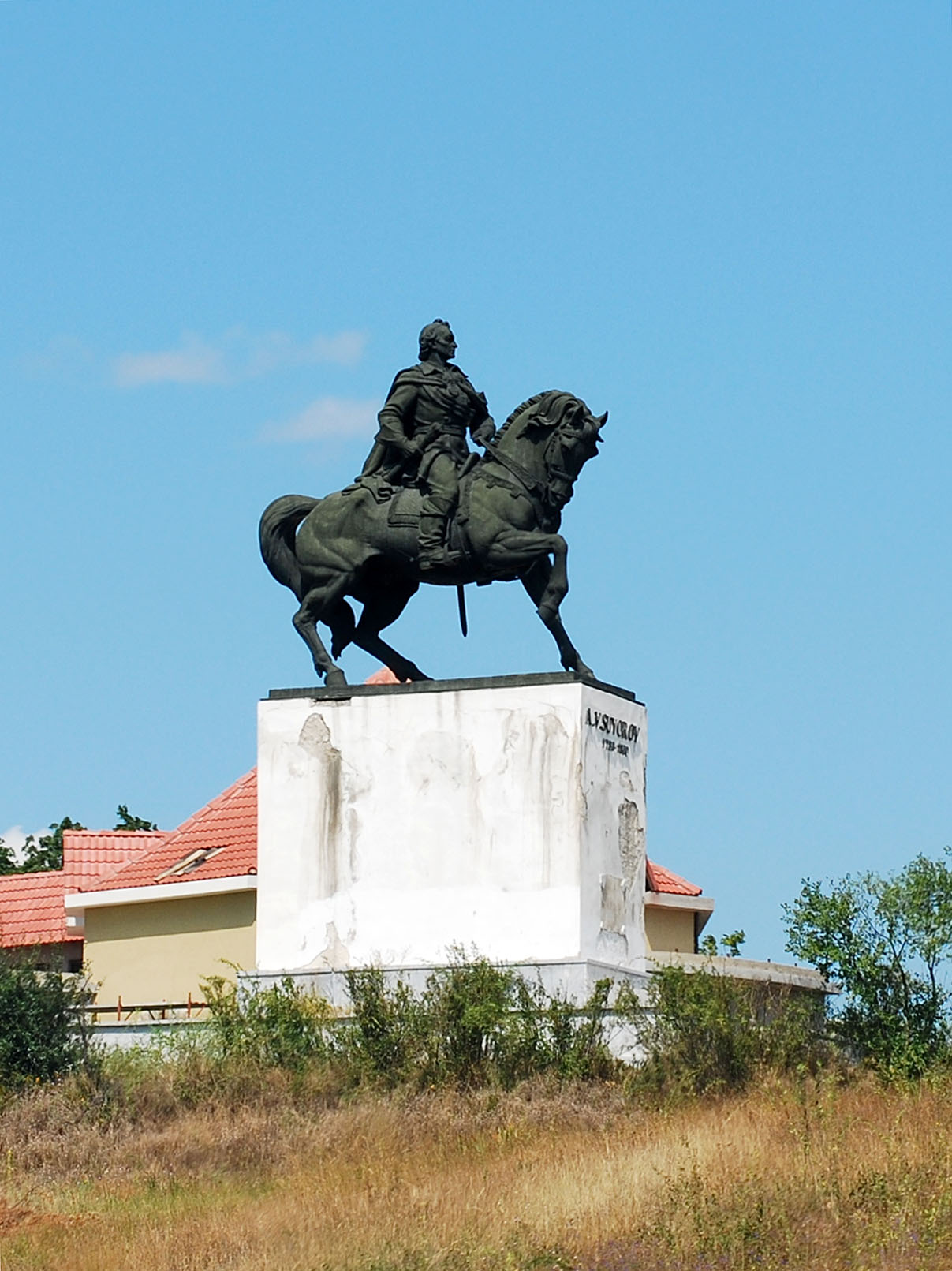
- Alexander Suvorov's monument in Dumbrăveni

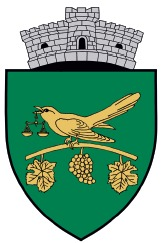
- Coat of arms

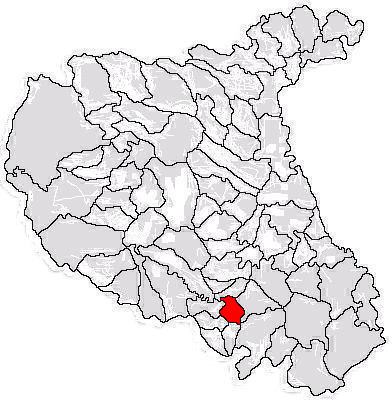
- Location in Vrancea County

- Location in Romania
- Coordinates: 45.55°N 27.1°E
- Country: Romania
- County: Vrancea

Government
  - Mayor (2024–2028): Valentin Tîlvăr (PSD)
- Area: 32.59 km^{2} (12.58 sq mi)
- Elevation: 96 m (315 ft)
- Population (2021-12-01): 4,174
  - Density: 128.1/km^{2} (331.7/sq mi)
- Time zone: UTC+02:00 (EET)
  - Summer (DST): UTC+03:00 (EEST)
- Postal code: 627105
- Area code: +(40) 237
- Vehicle reg.: VN
- Website: www.dumbraveni.primarievn.ro

Dumbrăveni is a commune located in Vrancea County, Romania. It is composed of four villages: Alexandru Vlahuță, Cândești, Dragosloveni, and Dumbrăveni.

During the interwar period, the commune was named Plăinești and was the headquarters of plasa Marginea de Sus, in Râmnicu Sărat County. From 1948 to 1964, during the rule of Communist dictator Gheorghe Gheorghiu-Dej, the commune was called Generalisimul Suvorov, after Alexander Suvorov, the 18th-century Russian general who won several battles in the area.

Dumbrăveni lies in a hilly area of southern Vrancea County, on the banks of the river Râmna. It is traversed by national road DN2, which connects the county seat, Focșani, 18 km (11 mi) to the north, to Râmnicu Sărat, Buzău County, 20 km (12 mi) to the south.

Historical population
Year	Pop.	±%
2002	4,136	—
2011	4,281	+3.5%
2021	4,174	−2.5%
Source: Census data

== Natives ==
- Gheorghe Plagino (1876–1949), sports shooter
- George Ștefănescu (1914–2007), painter
- Duiliu Zamfirescu (1858–1922), writer
