= French Triathlon Federation =

Triathlon governing body in France

- Sport: Triathlon
- Membership: 758
- Abbreviation: FFTri
- Founded: 1989
- Affiliation: World Triathlon
- Regional affiliation: Europe Triathlon
- Headquarters: Saint-Denis
- President: Cédric Gosse

Official website
- www.fftri.com
- (France)

The French Triathlon Federation (FFTri, Fédération française de triathlon) is a nonprofit organization established in 1989 under the French 1901 Association Law. It is responsible for organizing, governing, and developing triathlon, its related disciplines, and various outdoor multisport events in France

The FFTri is affiliated with the French National Olympic and Sports Committee (CNOSF), the French Paralympic and Sports Committee (CPSF), as well as the International Triathlon Union (ITU) and the European Triathlon Federation (ETU).

== History ==
The French Triathlon Federation (FFTri) was formed from the restructuring of its predecessor, the National Committee for the Development of Triathlon (Conadet), established in 1985.

In 2009, the French Ministry of Sports granted the FFTri official jurisdiction over two multisport disciplines: aquathlon and run and bike. This institutional recognition led to the organization of French National Championships for these triathlon-derived sports.

In 2015, the Sports Ministry expanded the FFTri's responsibilities by entrusting it with the organization of para-triathlon and para-duathlon events, thereby bringing adaptive triathlon and duathlon under its governance.

In 2019, the FFTri added aquabike to its scope of authority, a triathlon-related discipline. Internationally, this sport is recognized under the distinct name "Swim Bike" by the international federation.

Philippe Lescure served as President of the French Triathlon Federation from March 2001 until the end of 2020, completing four consecutive terms. Cédric Gosse succeeded him as president in early 2021.
