= René Guyot =

Belgian sport shooter

Olympic medal record

Men's Shooting
Silver medal – second place	1900 Paris	Trap shooting

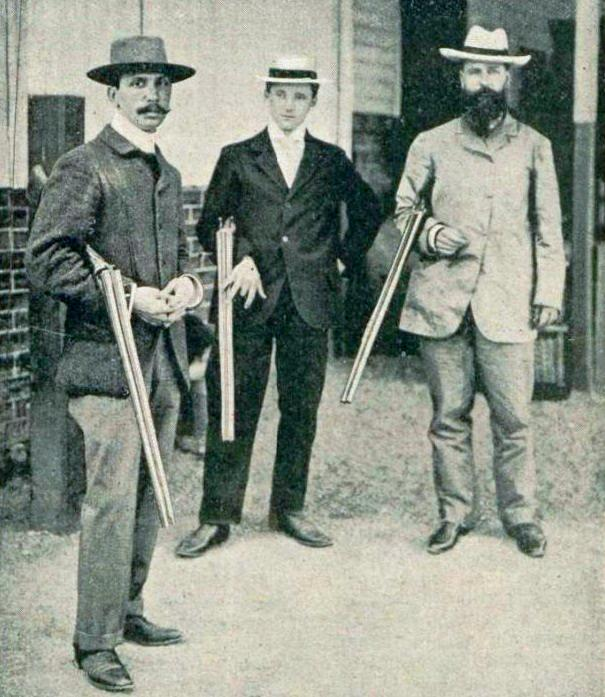
Shooting trap 1900

René Guyot (French: [ʁəne ɡɥijo]; born 1881) was a Belgian sport shooter who competed in the late 19th century and early 20th century in trap shooting. He participated in Shooting at the 1900 Summer Olympics in Paris and won the silver medal in the trap competition.
