= French Golf Federation =

Sports governing body in France

- Sport: Golf
- Abbreviation: FFG
- Founded: 1912
- Affiliation: International Golf Federation
- Regional affiliation: European Golf Association
- Headquarters: Levallois-Perret
- President: Pascal Grizot

Official website
- www.ffgolf.org
- (France)

The French Golf Federation (French: Fédération française de golf, FFG) is the national governing body for golf in France.

The current president is Pascal Grizot, who was elected on December 5, 2020, succeeding Jean-Lou Charon, who had been elected in 2013. In December 2024, Grizot was re-elected as president of the French Golf Federation.

== History ==
The French Golf Federation was founded on January 13, 1933, from the Union des golfs de France (UGF), which was initially established on November 24, 1912.

In 1950, the federation listed 44 golf courses, a number that had nearly doubled by 1960. The 1980s marked a significant milestone with the computerization of license management and the creation of smaller structures. In 1980, La Poste issued a commemorative stamp to celebrate the federation, highlighting its national importance.

In the 2000s, the federation focused on expanding access to golf. This included the introduction of programs like "Tous au golf" (Everyone to Golf), a free introductory initiative, and the creation of the first urban compact golf course in Saint-Ouen-l’Aumône in 2000. In 2011, France was designated as the host country for the 2018 Ryder Cup, a major event held at Le Golf National.

In 2022, France hosted the World Amateur Team Championships at Le Golf National and Saint-Nom-la-Bretèche. In 2024, Le Golf National was the Olympic venue for the golf events of the Paris Games.
