= Roger de Barbarin =

French sport shooter

Olympic medal record

Men's shooting

Representing France
Gold medal – first place	1900 Paris	Trap shooting

Émile Roger Thomas de Barbarin (4 June 1860 – 4 March 1925) was a French sport shooter who competed in the late 19th century and early 20th century in trap shooting. He participated in Shooting at the 1900 Summer Olympics in Paris and won the gold medal in the trap competition. de Barbarin was born in Paris, where he also died.

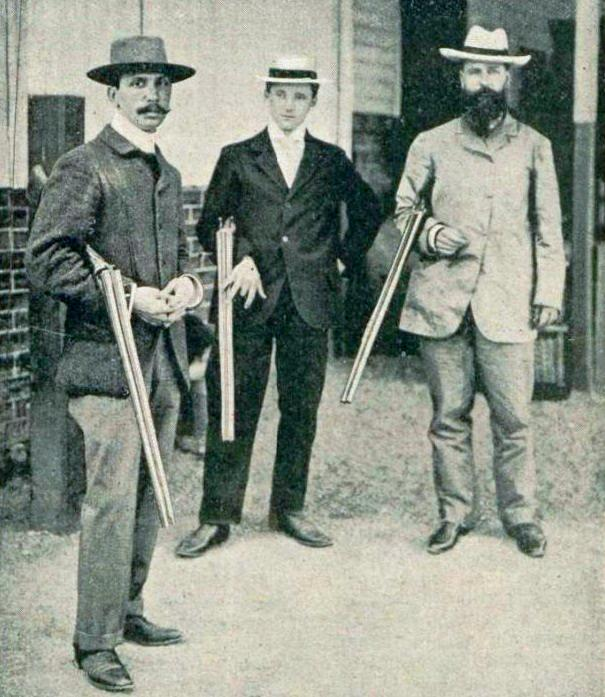
