= French Table Tennis Federation =

Governing body for table tennis in France

- Sport: Table Tennis
- Membership: 3000
- Abbreviation: FFTT
- Founded: 1927
- Headquarters: 13th arrondissement of Paris
- President: Gilles Erb

Official website
- www.fftt.com
- (France)

The French Table Tennis Federation (French: Fédération Française de Tennis de Table, FFTT) is the governing body for table tennis in France. It was founded in March 1927. Its headquarters is located in the 13th arrondissement of Paris.

Since December 6, 2020, the president of the federation is Gilles Erb, who was re-elected on December 7, 2024.

In 2023-2024, the federation had 183,143 licensed members (in addition to 40,044 event-specific licenses), spread across more than 3,000 clubs.

The FFTT organizes numerous individual and team competitions each year, including the French National Individual and Team Championships, as well as the Federal Criterium.

== Presidents ==
- 1927 - 1929: Jean Foucault
- 1929 - 1933: Comte Fernand Palmieri
- 1933 - 1935: Marcel Corbillon
- 1935 - 1937: Charles Guerin
- 1937 - 1942: Robert Parent
- 1942: Marcel Corbillon
- 1942 - 1944: Robert Foulon
- 1944 - 1959: Jean Prulière
- 1959 - 1966: Pierre Ceccaldi
- 1966 - 1978: Georges Duclos
- 1978 - 1982: Jean-Paul Courtier
- 1982 - 1991: Bernard Jeu
- 1991 - 1992: René Champdorge
- 1992 - 2000: Pierre Albertini
- 2000 - 2008: Gérard Velten
- 2008 - 2011: Alain Dubois
- 2011: Jacques Helaine
- 2011 - 2020: Christian Palierne
- 2020 - Current: Gilles Erb
