= Dome Village =

Community in Los Angeles, California, USA

Coordinates: 34.0487°N 118.2671°W

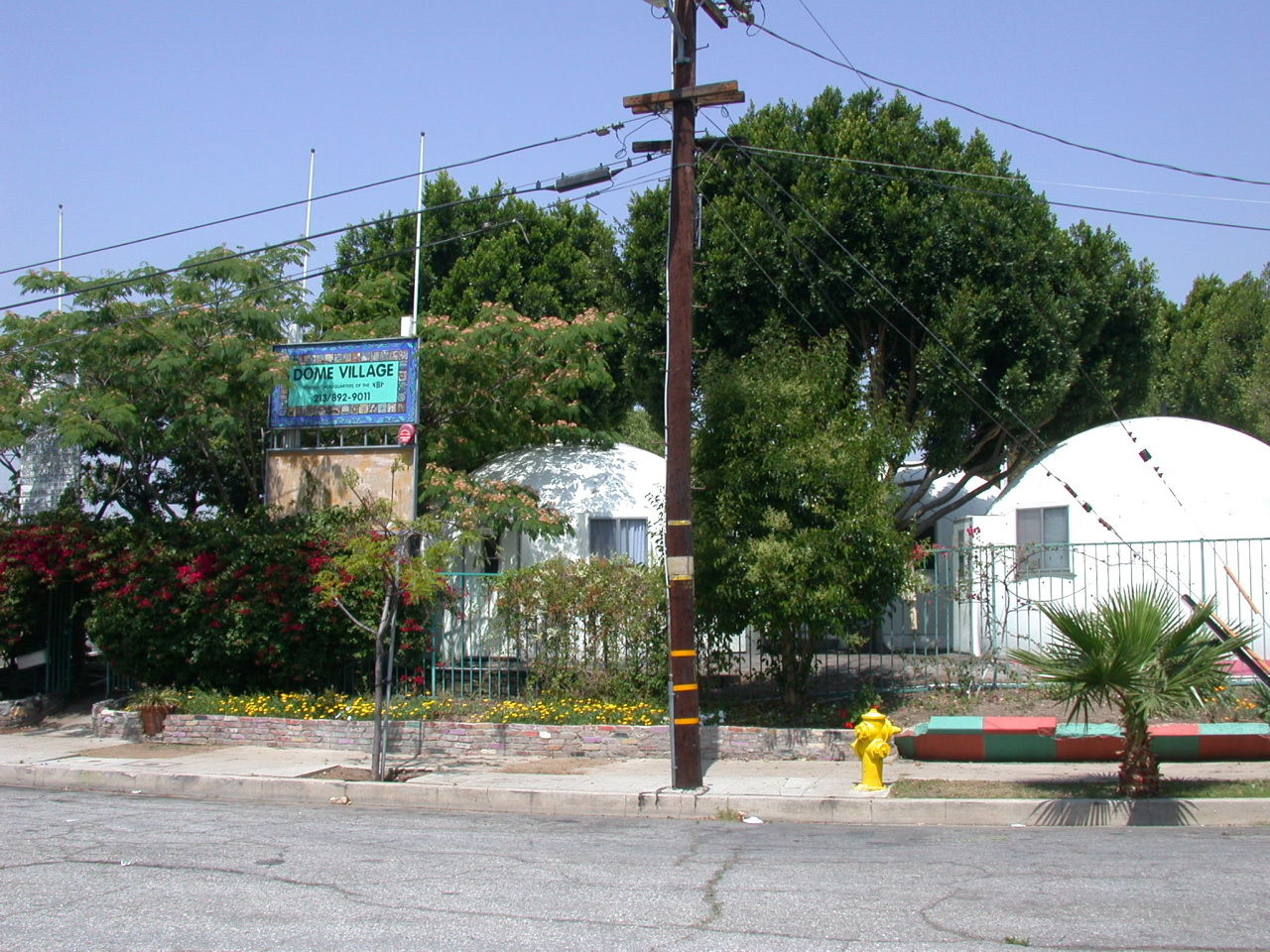
Dome Village in 2002

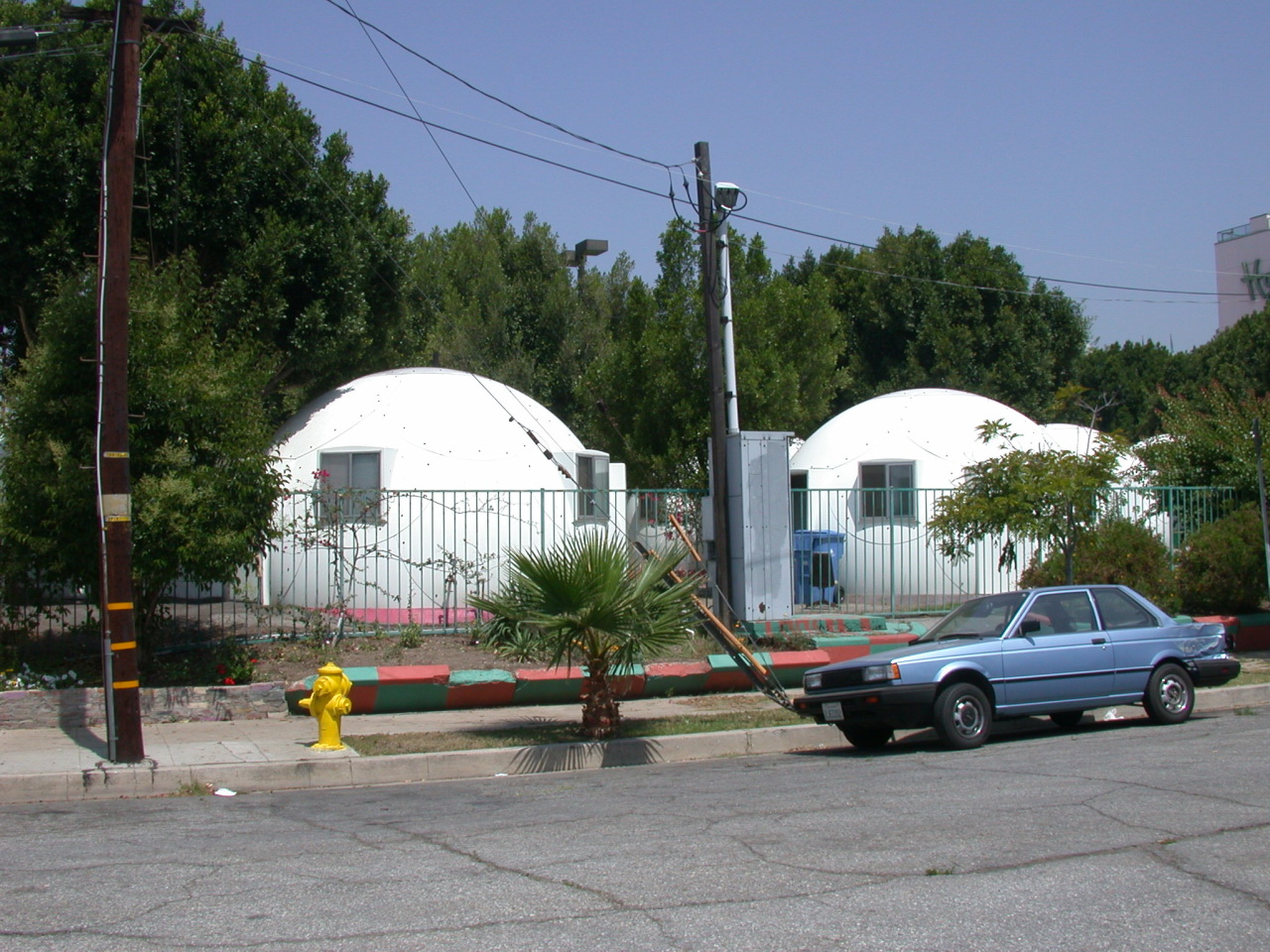

Dome Village was a self-governing community of "people unable or [...] unwilling to live in traditional [homeless] shelters". Located in Downtown Los Angeles at 847 Golden Avenue, the complex consisted of 20 geodesic domes and was inhabited by "up to 34 individuals and their family members". Operated by Justiceville/Homeless USA, a non-profit organization, members of Dome Village were politically active in homelessness, nonviolence, and environmental issues.

== History ==
Prior to becoming the Dome Village, the site was a shantytown inhabited by the homeless. In 1993, the village was founded by activist Ted Hayes. The village setting is intended to create stability for residents who live an otherwise-precarious existence. A song titled "People In Need" recorded by Gospel legend, Edwin Hawkins, Tramaine Hawkins and the Edwin Hawkins Singers was dedicated to the creation of Dome Village by The Benefit Network in 1988. In 1987, Tom "Beefbone" Bolema produced a benefit 12 inch single "Justiceville/Ted's Rap" featuring The Butchers and Electro-Shock. The song became the soundtrack for the video "Justiceville", produced by Gary Glaser, which documents the bull-dozing of a Ted Hayes encampment that preceded Dome Village.

The dwellings were designed by architect Craig Chamberlain, a former student of Buckminster Fuller. The domes, which cost about $10,000 each and are easy to repair and maintain, are made of polyester fiberglass. Funding for the village provided by ARCO, a subsidiary of BP.

On August 31, 2006, Hayes announced that the residents of Dome Village were being evicted and that domes would be auctioned off online. Residents, were given until October 2006 to get out, moved in traditional homeless shelters. They hope to recreate Dome Village elsewhere in Los Angeles with the proceeds from the auction.

== Programs ==
Dome Village offered numerous programs for its residents, including workshops in computer literacy, jobseeking, legal issues, and children's theatre, a community art program called Street Without a Name (SWAN), two cricket teams, community gardening programs, and many others.
