= Sruli Recht =

- שרולי רכט
- Born: 1979 (age 46–47); Jerusalem, Israel
- Education: Royal Melbourne Institute of Technology
- Occupation: Designer
- Labels: Sruli Recht, Sruli Recht Shoes
- Awards: Premium Young Designer Award, Kvosin competition for Reykjavik City Center, IDA – International Design Awards
- Website: srulirecht.com

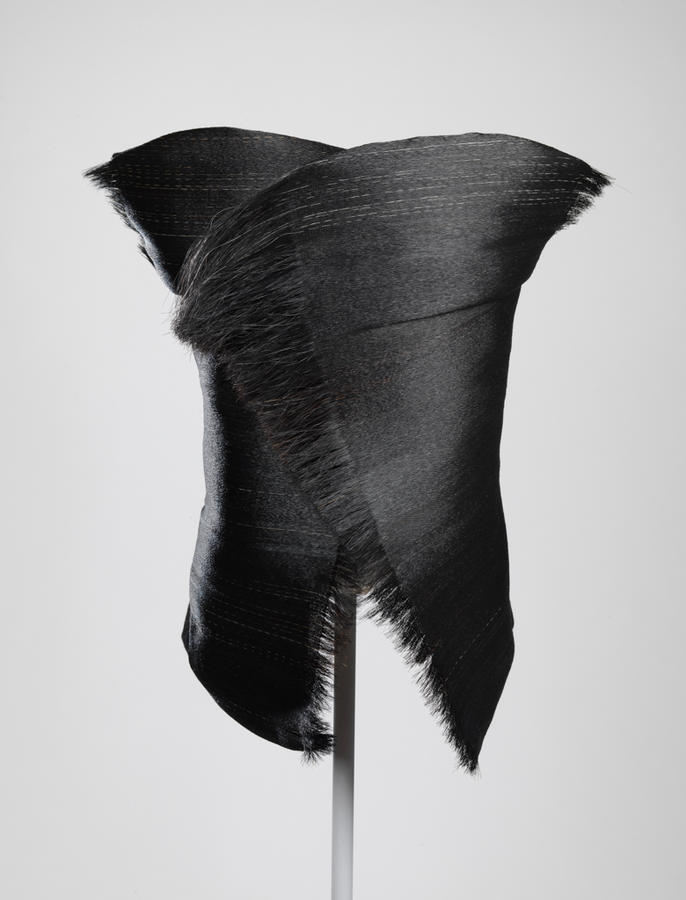
Horset, 2012. Satin-woven horsehair men's corset. (RISD Museum)

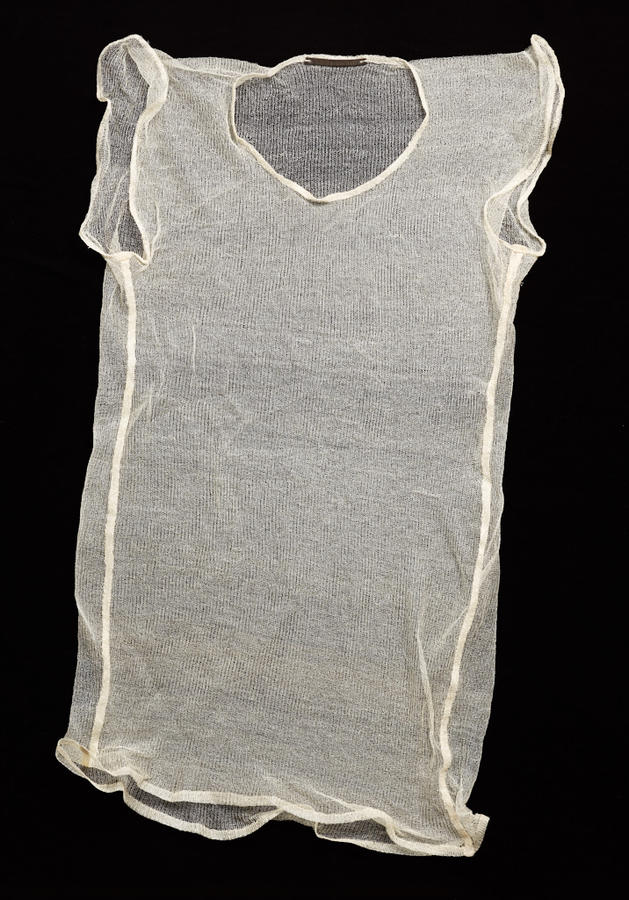
An Emperor's New Untangling, 2012. Knitted sheer shirt made from Biosteel, a synthesized spider silk made from genetically modified goat's milk proteins. (RISD Museum)

Sruli Recht (Hebrew: שרולי רכט; born 1979) is a designer and artist based in Reykjavík, Iceland. He was born in Jerusalem, Israel, and holds Australian and Icelandic citizenship.

Recht studied Fashion Design at RMIT University in Melbourne, Australia. In 2005 Recht left Australia to London where he worked with British designer Alexander McQueen before relocating to Reykjavik, Iceland, where he has been based since 2005.

== Work ==
Recht's work is considered to be innovative in its use of indigenous, new and unconventional materials and technologies though also seen by many to be controversial due to the use of materials such as minke whale foreskin, spider silk, seal and human skin. Although he is known mostly as a fashion designer, some garments and show pieces from his seasonal collections are seen to blur the relationships between art, design and fashion.

Examples of this are:

- Carradina: An auto-erotic asphyxiation belt made from the skin of an Atlantic white-sided dolphin, provided with a hook to place on a door or handle.
- Stone Blind: A pair of frames with white hand-cut Carrara marble lenses, intended for the visually impaired.
- A Lasting Impression: Gloves made from the skin of a basking shark with the barbs on the inside of the glove. Due to the direction of the barbs, once the glove is put on the wearer can not remove them again unless they cut the gloves off.
- The Damned: A pocket square, or handkerchief, made from bullet-proof kevlar, intended to be worn in the breast pocket of a suit to protect the heart.

And arguably his most controversial piece:

- Forget Me Knot: In 2012 Recht documented a one-off surgery/performance during which a plastic surgeon removed a 110 mm × 10 mm strip of skin from his abdomen while he was awake. The piece of skin with the hair still attached was tanned and mounted to a 24kt gold ring

== Collections ==
His solo commercial career began with the launch of a shoe collection under the Sruli Recht label in 2007, described by WGSN as "...one of the most intriguing and imaginative footwear collections seen." This collection was highlighted by the controversial use of one boot made from minke whale skins. Prior to the 2008 economic downturn Recht began to release one product a month under a collection titled Non-Products, while preparing to launch the main clothing line. Recht launched the seasonal clothing line in Paris in 2011 that he had developed during the crash in Iceland, in 2010 from his studio based on the outskirts of Reykjavik He has been presenting as part of the Paris Fashion Week runway schedule since January 2012

"Luxury of Choice" is a collection released by Recht in 2020. It is a collection of 19 objects designed to be "Not an attempt to glamorize or promote taking one’s own life, but to consider self-deliverance as a worthy act; the one that requires a sense of the personal and intimate." These objects span four main methods, listed as "by breath," "by fire," "by water," and "by earth." This collection was inspired by the suicide method of a friend of Recht's, involving a "300 kronur rope used for pulling cars."

== Notoriety ==
Wallpaper magazine selected Recht's store Vopnabúrið, an Icelandic word for "the Armoury", among the ten most interesting shops in the world in 2010, along with stores such as Hermes in New York, Comme de Garçons in Hong Kong and the Stella McCartney store in Milan.

Recht's studio was raided by the Icelandic police in August 2009 where they seized stock of The Umbuster (a combination of an umbrella and brass knuckles) and charged Recht with prohibited weapons importation, prohibited weapons manufacture, and intent to sell prohibited weapons. Recht initially lost the case brought against him by the police, though appealed, while at the same time opening a new case with the supreme court of Iceland to de-categorise The Umbuster as a weapon. In October 2010 Recht won the case, the court deciding that The Umbuster was not a weapon, and was acquitted of the earlier charges.

== Publications ==
- Randscharf – On the Cutting Edge – Design in Iceland, Gestalten
- Shoe Design – Overview of contemporary shoe designers, Daab Publishing
- Outside The Box, Cardboard Design Now – International packaging design, Black Dog Publishing
- Hello, Mr. Package ! – International packaging design focusing on male designers, SendPoint Publishing
- Magma – Magma / Kvika Contemporary Iceland Design 2007
- Magic Packaging – International packaging design, Designer Books
- Art of Package Design – International packaging design, Ginko Press
- Doppelganger – Images of the Human Being, Gestalten

== Interviews ==
- Core77 – Three part interview
