= Gaston Vidal =

French politician (1888–1949)

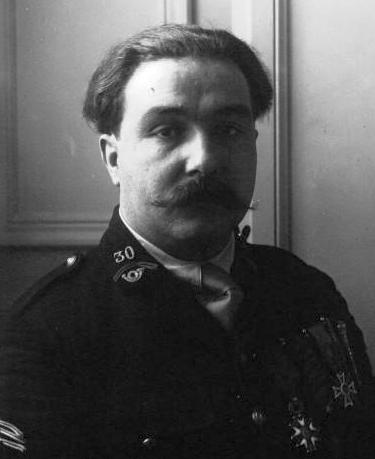
- Gaston Vidal in 1917, Captain of 30th battalion of Chasseurs

French parliamentary deputy 1919–1924

Personal details
- Born: 18 October 1888 Saint-Étienne (Loire )
- Died: 14 March 1949 (aged 60) Paris, France
- Party: PRS
- Profession: Politician

Gaston Vidal (18 October 1888 – 14 March 1949) was a French politician and sports leader.

== Career ==
Vidal began his professional career as a teacher at a primary school of Moulins, Allier. In 1914, he joined the Chasseurs Alpins and was promoted to captain because of his brilliant talent. In 1919, he was elected as municipal councilor at Vichy.

Later, he became general councilor of Moulins-East from 1919 to 1925 and Republican Socialist delegate for Allier to the National Assembly for 1919 to 1924 and member of the military commissions and military pensions.

He also became Undersecretary of State for Technical Education from 17 January 1921 to 29 March 1924, when Aristide Briand and Raymond Poincaré. He later became a general councilor of Vichy from 1927 to 1928.

== Sports ==
He chaired the Union des Sociétés Françaises de Sports Athlétiques (USFSA). After the First World War, he created single-sport federations for football, rugby, swimming and field hockey. He was also a member of the French National Olympic and Sports Committee. He took a decisive role alongside, Frantz Reichel, in preparing the Paris Olympics in 1924. Vidal was succeeded by Justinian Clary, from 1925 to 1931.
