= Youth Off The Streets =

Australian not-for-profit youth organisation

Youth Off The Streets is an Australian non-denominational not-for-profit youth organisation. The organisation works with young people and their families and communities in an endeavour to create safety, offer support and provide opportunities to build a positive future.

Youth Off The Streets was founded by Father Chris Riley in the 1990s. The organisation now delivers a range of wraparound supports for young people, including crisis accommodation and housing services, independent high schools, alcohol and other drugs counselling, youth justice support, life skills and employment programs, cultural support and community engagement.

Father Chris Riley was the CEO of Youth Off The Streets until May 2020, when he transitioned into the role of Founder and was replaced by former Deputy CEO Lex Nadine Lutherborrow. Currently, Judy Barraclough is serving as Youth Off The Streets' CEO.

== History ==
Youth Off The Streets began as an idea with Chris Riley operating a single food van that provided meals to homeless young people in Kings Cross, Sydney, New South Wales. Father Chris Riley then spent the next three decades developing Youth Off The Streets into a "leading non-denominational youth services organisation".

In April 1995, Riley started the Dunlea Adolescent Alcohol and Drug Treatment Program in Merrylands, Western Sydney. As of January 2023, the program is called Dunlea Alcohol and Other Drugs Youth Service.

In 1996, Youth Off The Streets opened its first independent high school: Key College, Redfern. Key College caters to young people aged between 14 and 18 who have become disconnected from mainstream education.

Youth Off The Streets is now responsible for the management of seven accredited independent high schools across Greater Sydney, the Illawarra region and the New South Wales Central Coast.

Riley also developed and implemented strategies that were supposed to help young people deal with trauma, abuse and neglect. Several of these strategies – including the Values Education Service Learning Curriculum – have been adopted by schools and government agencies across Australia.

As of 2024, Youth Off The Streets offers integrated support services and programs for young people and families, enabled and delivered by approximately 200 staff and 330 volunteers.

Additionally, Riley assisted young people overseas in East Timor after independence in 2002. Following the 2004 Indian Ocean earthquake and tsunami, Youth Off The Streets helped build an orphanage in Aceh, Indonesia. The not-for-profit Youth Off The Streets Overseas Relief Fund was established to work on small projects alongside local partners, providing assistance to children and young people, including housing, education, health and welfare facilities and programs.

== Youth services ==
=== Homelessness and housing ===
Youth Off The Streets provides various homelessness and housing support services for young people aged 25 and under. These services include prevention and early intervention support, crisis accommodation in two youth refuges, transitional housing, one-on-one casework support and referrals to other specialist services. Youth Off The Streets also offers life skills programs and brokerage support so that they may help young people find and keep safe housing. Their Street Walk program provides after-hours practical help and referrals for young people who are at risk of homelessness in Sydney.

=== Education ===
Youth Off The Streets operates six independent high schools that are registered and accredited with the New South Wales Education Standards Authority (NESA). Its learning programs for Years 9–12 are designed to have a flexible approach that responds to the specific needs of students. Its Schooling via Off-campus Learning for At-Risk students (SOLAR) Program at EDEN College in Sydney's Macquarie Fields was created during the 2020 COVID-19 lockdowns. The SOLAR Program seeks to keep vulnerable students engaged with school.

=== Alcohol and other drugs ===
Youth Off The Streets' Dunlea Alcohol and Other Drugs Youth Service aims to help young people in Western Sydney aged 13 to 19 take control of their drug use. The program works with young people and their families and aspires to help them break the cycle of drug misuse, set personal goals and build the foundations for a healthy life.

=== Mental health support ===
Youth Off The Streets helps young people to access mental health support services. These services include a specialist Alcohol and Other Drugs Counsellor at its Dunlea service, caseworkers who help young people access the mental health services that are theorised to best support their recovery, and counselling and psychological support services for enrolled students in its independent high schools.

=== Life skills and personal growth ===
Youth Off The Streets offers multiple opportunities that are intended to develop the practical living skills and social skills that bring about a positive and independent future.

=== Youth justice ===
Youth Off The Streets provides one-on-one support and services to young people involved with or at risk of being involved with the justice system. These services include specialist casework, diversion programs, therapeutic pathways and a court support program.

=== Cultural support ===
Youth Off The Streets works with First Nations young people and young people from multicultural backgrounds in ways that are intended to be safe, welcoming and culture-specific. The Cultural Development team works with the organisation to determine that the rights and needs of young people from diverse cultural backgrounds are reflected in its services and programs.

=== Scholarships, training and employment ===
Youth Off The Streets supports young people who want to continue their education after high school, gain employment skills, or find a stable job. Its National Scholarship Program has been running since 2004 and provides financial assistance, mentoring and other support to young people engaged in training or further education. Youth Off The Streets is also an approved Registered training organisation (RTO code 41450) and delivers several nationally accredited Vocational education and training (VET) courses to enrolled students in its independent high schools.

=== Community engagement ===
Youth Off The Streets provides a range of activities and support services to young people aged 12–25 across Greater Sydney, regional NSW and some areas of Queensland and Victoria. It runs youth spaces in Blacktown, Merrylands, Weston and Logan, as well as the Koch Centre for Youth and Learning in Macquarie Fields and the Cordeaux Centre for Youth and Learning in the Illawarra.

=== Street Walk and Food Van ===
Youth Off The Streets' Street Walk program runs on multiple nights every week, providing support to homeless and vulnerable young people in Sydney's CBD, Inner West, and surrounding areas.

The Food Van operates every night of the year and travels between Darlinghurst and Green Park in Sydney.

== Funding ==
Youth Off The Streets is a registered charity with the Australian Charities and Not-for-profits Commission. The organisation receives income from federal, state and local governments, corporate partnerships and fundraising activities.

== See also ==
- Canteen
- Father Chris Riley
- Mission Australia
- The Reach Foundation
- The Smith Family
- Wesley Mission
- Youth homelessness
