= Gheorghe Plagino =

Romanian sports shooter (1876–1949)

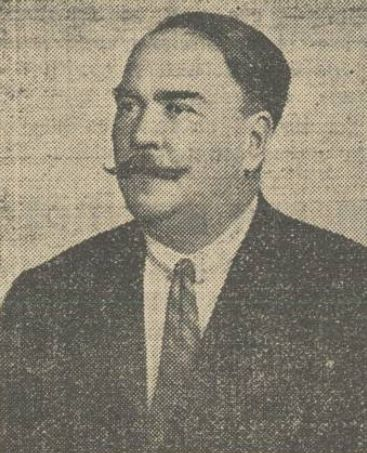
- Plagino circa 1935

Personal information
- Full name: George Alexandru Plagino
- Born: November 16, 1876 Dumbrăveni, Principality of Romania
- Died: May 3, 1949 (aged 72) Bucharest, Socialist Republic of Romania
- Occupation(s): Sport shooter Politician
- Spouse: Colette Lahovary (–1935)

Sport
- Club: Club des Chasseurs

Achievements and titles
- Olympic finals: 1900

Georghe Plagino (16 November 1876 – 3 May 1949) was a Romanian sports shooter and politician who competed in the 1900 Summer Olympics and served on the International Olympic Committee (IOC).

== Early life ==
Plagino was born in Dumbrăveni, Vrancea County on 16 November 1876 to Alexandru Plagiano and Wilhelmina Sieffert out of wedlock. His father was the son in law of Prince Barbu Știrbey and owned almost 60,000 hectares (150,000 acres) of arable land and forest. His birth was made legitimate when he was 18 years old after his parents married. He later married the Romanian Ambassador to France, Alexandru Lahovary's daughter Colette. Colette would later become Queen Marie of Romania's maid of honor, be given a Star of Romania for "devotion during the World War", and be a part of King Michael I's baptism.

== Olympic career ==
On 15 July at the 1900 Summer Olympics, Plagiano became the first Romanian Olympian after competing in the men's trap shooting event, where he came tied for 13th with 11 out of 20 possible points. He was the only Romanian competitor that year. Nobody else competed for the nation until the 1924 Summer Olympics.

Shooter	Event	Final	
Shooter	Event	Score	Rank
Gheorghe Plagino	Trap shooting	11	13

== Administrative career ==
Plagiano started the Automobile Club of Romania in 1904. He was put onto the International Olympic Committee (IOC) by postal vote in 1908, succeeding Gheorghe Bibescu. He remained on the committee until his death in 1949. He also won the Romanian national trap shooting title in 1927 and 1928, As well as serving as President of the Romanian Shooting Federation, he served as vice-president of the Romanian Olympic Committee from 1923 to 1940, and was a member of it until he was removed by Communist authorities in 1948. He was elected as the first President of the Union of Romanian Sports Federations from 1933 until 1940. He was also a Romanian Senator.

== Later life and death ==
Plagino and Colette divorced in 1935. He died in Bucharest on 3 May 1949.
