= Chris Riley (priest) =

Australian Catholic priest (1954–2025)

The Reverend Chris Riley SDB AM

Personal life
- Born: Christopher Keith Riley; 24 November 1954 Echuca, Victoria, Australia
- Died: 31 July 2025 (aged 70)
- Education: Salesian College (Rupertswood)
- Website: youthoffthestreets.com.au

Religious life
- Religion: Christian (Roman Catholic)
- School: Salesian
- Profession: Priest and youth worker

Senior posting
- Present post: CEO of Youth Off The Streets
- Previous post: Principal, Boys Town

Christopher Keith Riley SDB AM (24 November 1954 – 31 July 2025) was an Australian Roman Catholic priest. He was a member of the Salesian order and the founder and CEO of the charity Youth Off The Streets.

== Early years ==
Riley was born in Echuca, Victoria, in 1954 and grew up on a dairy farm in the district. In 1973 he graduated from a school run by the Salesians. He was inspired by the movie Boys Town and went on to train as a teacher. He worked as a teacher, youth worker, probation officer, residential care worker and principal of the charity Boys' Town. In 1982 he was ordained a priest in Oakleigh, Victoria.

Riley was the founder and CEO of Youth Off The Streets and worked with disadvantaged youth for more than 35 years in a variety of roles including teacher, youth worker, probation officer, residential carer and principal. He officially founded Youth Off The Streets in 1991.

As CEO of Youth Off The Streets, Riley oversaw the operation of over 25 programs which employ over 200 staff and involve more than 330 volunteers. He implemented innovative behaviour modification strategies to help young people deal with a history of trauma, abuse and neglect.

== Youth Off The Streets ==
Riley founded Youth Off The Streets (YOTS) in 1991 with a food van delivering meals to homeless youth in the Kings Cross area in Sydney. Since then the organisation has grown to offer more than 35 services, including Aboriginal programs, crisis accommodation, alcohol and other drug services, counselling, accredited high schools, outreach, residential programs and a mentoring program. The organisation is non-denominational and works for young people who are homeless, drug dependent and recovering from abuse.

Riley made frequent media appearances on behalf of YOTS, including a weekly radio segment broadcast on 2UE in Sydney and 2CC in Canberra.

=== Attitude towards gambling ===
In the decade from 2000 to 2009, Youth Off The Streets received $3.5 million in donations from the Australian gambling industry, particularly poker machines.

Riley lobbied against the taxation of gambling, stating that "the Government won't fund services like mine and are now also attacking the revenues that we previously did have available". With respect to his position on the effect of gambling on society, in 2003 he stated in a radio interview, "I acknowledge that the great problem facing the community is people who are addicted to gambling and I call for the clubs to put in place systems and supports to help people fight this addiction."

In December 2011, it was revealed that Riley had lent his name in support of a campaign by Clubs Australia against proposed mandatory precommitment limits for poker machines. Riley expressed his concern saying that a better way to tackle problem gambling was treatment and counselling, not legislation.

== Illness and death ==
On 3 April 2021, the Sydney Morning Herald reported that Riley was gravely ill with a variety of ailments. His condition included Alzheimer's and diabetes.

Riley died on 31 July 2025 at the age of 70.

== Awards and honours ==
In the 2006 Birthday Honours, Riley was appointed a Member of the Order of Australia (AM) for service to disadvantaged youth through the establishment of Youth Off The Streets and the development of a range of assistance and mentoring initiatives for adolescents and to the welfare of children overseas through humanitarian assistance efforts. In 2006, he also received the Human Rights Medal from the then Human Rights and Equal Opportunity Commission (shared with broadcaster Phillip Adams).

On 20 April 2010, Riley was awarded an honorary doctorate by the University of Western Sydney in recognition of his work.

In 2012, Riley was nominated as New South Wales' Australian of the Year for his work with disadvantaged youth.
