= 300 m rifle three positions =

Sport shooting event

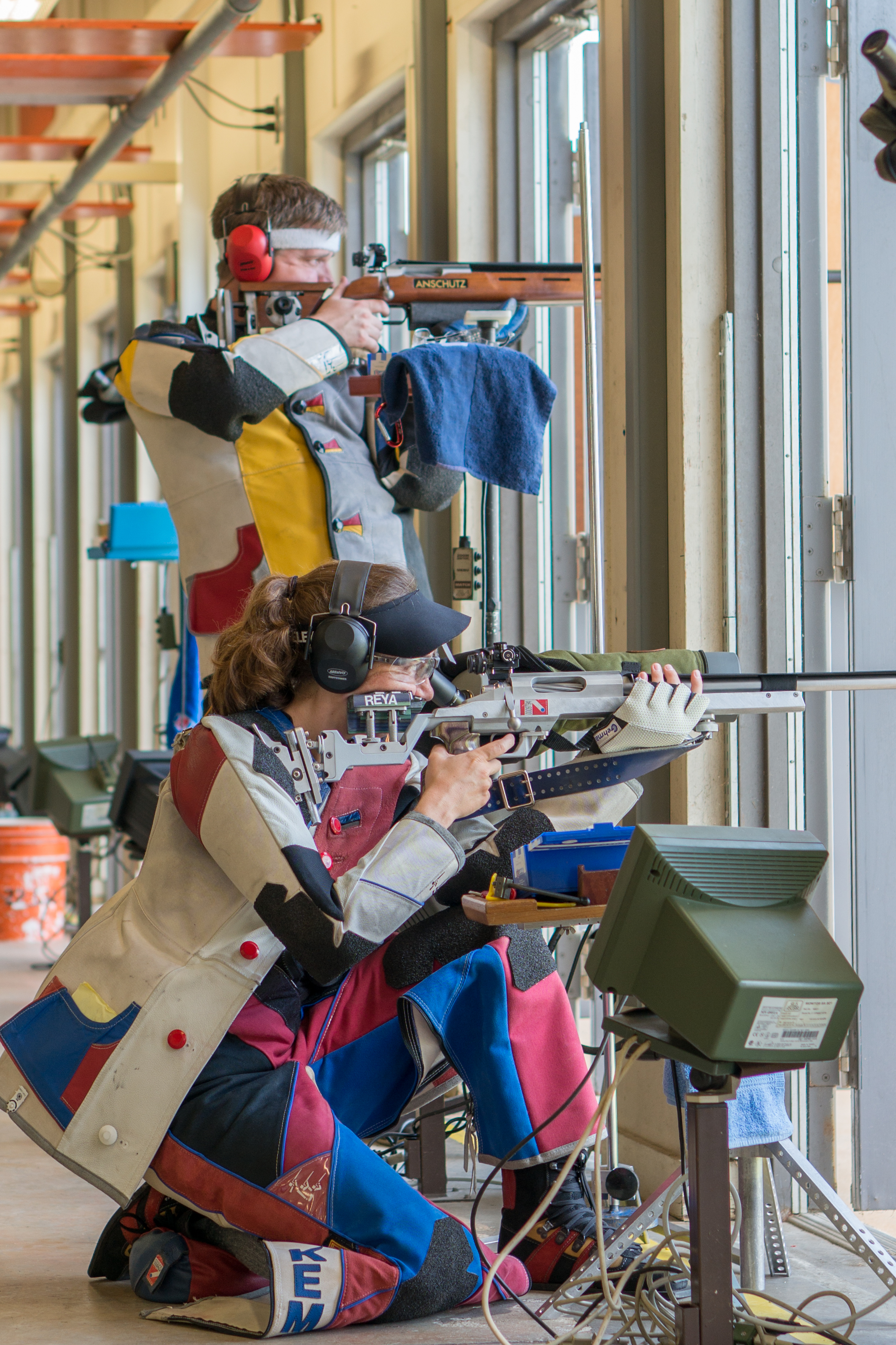

Men
- Number of shots: 3x40
- Olympic Games: 1900–1972
- World Championships: Since 1897
- Abbreviation: 300FR3X40

Women
- Number of shots: 3x40
- World Championships: Since 2002
- Abbreviation: 300R3X40

300 m rifle three positions (formerly known as one of four free rifle disciplines) is an ISSF shooting event, involving shooting 40 shots each from the prone, the standing and the kneeling positions. Men and women both shoot the same number of shots, though previously women only shot half the course – or 20 shots in each position.

Originally there had been champions declared in each position based on the results of the 40 shots in the three position match. A special 300 metre rifle prone match was added in 1982 however, after a pattern from the so-called English Match. After 1990, no World Championship medals have been awarded in the standing or kneeling position.

== History ==
300 m rifle has been a declining event for many decades because of the considerable cost for competing in the event and the difficulty of creating ranges for it. The Olympic status was dropped in the 1970s, making 50 metre rifle the only rifle event on the program (10 metre air rifle was later added), it was in the Olympic program from 1900 to 1972. 300 m Rifle is still on the World and regional championships program, though.

Both men and women use the same rifle in this event, which has a weight limit of 8.0 kg. This rifle is not the same as the one used in the standard rifle 300m event, which has a lower weight limit of 5.5 kg, a minimum trigger pull of 1500g, and other restrictions regarding barrel length, and allowed accessories such as palm rests. The maximum caliber of ammunition is 8 mm, though the 6mm BR is most commonly used.

The 300 m rifle three positions event is part of the European Shooting Championships. The most recent was held in September 2019 in Tolmezzo, Italy.

== World Championships, Men ==
Year	Venue	Gold	Silver	Bronze
1897	(France) Lyon	Frank Jullien (SUI)	Ole Oestmo (NOR)	Karl Ehrensperger (SUI)
1898	(Italy) Turin	Achille Paroche (FRA)	Léon Moreaux (FRA)	Konrad Stäheli (SUI)
1899	(Netherlands) Loosduinen	Lars Jørgen Madsen (DEN)	Emil Kellenberger (SUI)	Franz Böckli (SUI)
1900	(France) Paris	Emil Kellenberger (SUI)	Anders Peter Nielsen (DEN)	Ole Oestmo (NOR); Paul Van Asbroeck (BEL)
1901	(Switzerland) Luzern	Emil Kellenberger (SUI)	Konrad Stäheli (SUI)	Henrik Sillem (NED)
1902	(Italy) Rome	Emil Kellenberger (SUI)	Attilio Conti (ITA)	Konrad Stäheli (SUI)
1903	(Argentina) Buenos Aires	Emil Kellenberger (SUI)	Louis Richardet (SUI)	Attilio Conti (ITA)
1904	(France) Lyon	Konrad Stäheli (SUI)	Jean Reich (SUI)	Maurice Marie Lecoq (FRA)
1905	(Belgium) Brussels	Charles Paumier du Verger (BEL)	Konrad Stäheli (SUI)	Louis Richardet (SUI)
1906	(Italy) Milan	Eugène Balme (FRA)	Maurice Marie Lecoq (FRA)	Charles Paumier du Verger (BEL)
1907	(Switzerland) Zurich	Konrad Stäheli (SUI)	Jean Reich (SUI)	Marcel Meyer de Stadelhofen (SUI)
1908	(Austria) Vienna	Charles Paumier du Verger (BEL)	Jean Reich (SUI)	Paul Van Asbroeck (BEL)
1909	(Germany) Hamburg	Konrad Stäheli (SUI)	Achille Paroche (FRA)	Paul Van Asbroeck (BEL)
1910	(Netherlands) Loosduinen	Jean Reich (SUI)	Konrad Stäheli (SUI)	Charles Paumier du Verger (BEL)
1911	(Italy) Rome	Konrad Stäheli (SUI)	Jakob Bryner (SUI)	Jean Reich (SUI)
1912	(France) Bayonne, Biarritz	Konrad Stäheli (SUI)	Paul Van Asbroeck (BEL)	Marcel Meyer de Stadelhofen (SUI)
1913	(United States) Camp Perry	Konrad Stäheli (SUI)	Caspar Widmer (SUI)	Mathias Brunner (SUI)
1914	(Denmark) Viborg	Rene Georges (FRA)	Konrad Stäheli (SUI)	Lars Jørgen Madsen (DEN)
1921	(France) Lyon	Walter Raymond Stokes (USA)	Carl Townsend Osburn (USA)	Josias Hartmann (SUI)
1922	(Italy) Milan	Walter Raymond Stokes (USA)	Walter Lienhard (SUI)	Karl Zimmermann (SUI)
1923	(United States) Camp Perry	Morris Fisher (USA)	Walter Raymond Stokes (USA)	Laurence Adam Nuesslein (USA)
1924	(France) Reims	Morris Fisher (USA)	Walter Raymond Stokes (USA)	Karl Zimmermann (SUI)
1925	(Switzerland) St. Gallen	Josias Hartmann (SUI)	Walter Lienhard (SUI)	Karl Zimmermann (SUI)
1927	(Italy) Rome	Josias Hartmann (SUI)	Karl Zimmermann (SUI)	Olle Ericsson (SWE)
1928	(Netherlands) Loosduinen	Olle Ericsson (SWE)	Jakob Reich (SUI)	Josias Hartmann (SUI)
1929	(Sweden) Stockholm	Josias Hartmann (SUI)	Karl Zimmermann (SUI)	Harry Renshaw (USA)
1930	(Belgium) Antwerp	Einari Oksa (FIN)	Harry Renshaw (USA)	Josias Hartmann (SUI)
1931	(Poland) Lvov	Karl Zimmermann (SUI)	Kullervo Leskinen (FIN)	Olle Ericsson (SWE)
1933	(Spain) Granada	Fernand Demierre (SUI)	Karl Zimmermann (SUI)	Einari Oksa (FIN)
1935	(Italy) Rome	Viktor Miinalainen (FIN)	Kullervo Leskinen (FIN)	Jaak Kärner (EST)
1937	(Finland) Helsinki	Elmar Kivistik (EST)	Olavi Elo (FIN)	Gustav Lokotar (EST)
1939	(Switzerland) Luzern	August Liivik (EST)	Toivo Maenttaeri (FIN)	Pauli Aapeli Janhonen (FIN)
1947	(Sweden) Stockholm	Pauli Aapeli Janhonen (FIN)	Robert Bürchler (SUI)	Otto Horber (SUI)
1949	(Argentina) Buenos Aires	Olavi Elo (FIN)	Pauli Aapeli Janhonen (FIN)	Jonas Jonsson (SWE)
1952	(Norway) Oslo	August Hollenstein (SUI)	Jorma Tuomas Taitto (FIN)	Robert Bürchler (SUI)
1954	(Venezuela) Caracas	Anatoli Bogdanov (URS)	Vasily Borisov (URS)	Vilho Ilmari Ylönen (FIN)
1958	(Soviet Union) Moscow	Vilho Ilmari Ylönen (FIN)	Daniel Bruce Puckel (USA)	Esa Einari Kervinen (FIN)
1962	(Egypt) Cairo	Gary Anderson (USA)	Vladimir Yevdokimov (URS)	Tommy Pool (USA)
1966	(West Germany) Wiesbaden	Gary Anderson (USA)	Alexander Gerasimenok (URS)	John Robert Foster (USA)
1970	(United States) Phoenix	Valentin Kornev (URS)	John Robert Foster (USA)	Vitali Parkhimovitch (URS)
1974	(Switzerland) Thun	Lanny Bassham (USA)	John Robert Foster (USA)	Max Huerzeler (SUI)
1978	(South Korea) Seoul	Lones Wigger (USA)	Juhani Laakso (FIN)	Kuno Bertschy (SUI)
1982	(Venezuela) Caracas	Gennadi Lushikov (URS)	Victor Daniltchenko (URS)	Malcolm Cooper (GBR)
1986	(Sweden) Skövde	Glenn Dubis (USA)	Malcolm Cooper (GBR)	Mauri Roeppaenen (FIN)
1990	(Soviet Union) Moscow	Malcolm Cooper (GBR)	Glenn Dubis (USA)	Joergen Herlufsen (DEN)
1994	(Italy) Tolmezzo	Glenn Dubis (USA)	Norbert Sturny (SUI)	Eric Chollet-Durand (SUI)
1998	(Spain) Zaragoza	Jean-Pierre Amat (FRA)	Pascal Bessy (FRA)	Glenn Dubis (USA)
2002	(Finland) Lahti	Rajmond Debevec (SLO)	Eric Uptagrafft (USA)	Thomas Jerabek (CZE)
2006	(Croatia) Zagreb	Espen Berg-Knutsen (NOR)	Vebjørn Berg (NOR)	Mario Knögler (AUT)
2010	(Germany) Munich	Marcel Bürge (SUI)	Vebjørn Berg (NOR)	Josselin Henry (FRA)
2014	(Spain) Granada	Ole-Kristian Bryhn (NOR)	Cyrill Graff (FRA)	Odd Arne Brekne (NOR)
2018	(South Korea) Changwon	Aleksi Leppä (FIN)	István Péni (HUN)	Gilles Vincent Dufaux (SUI)
2022	(Egypt) New Administrative Capital	Emilien Chassat (FRA)	Aleksi Leppä (FIN)	István Péni (HUN)

== World Championships, Men Team ==
Year	Place	Gold	Silver	Bronze
1897	(France) Lyon	(Switzerland) Switzerland; Karl Ehrensperger; Alcide Hirschy; Friedrich Lüthi; Frank Jullien; Louis Richardet	(Norway) Norway; Olaf Emil Frydenlund; Jens Jensen; Larsen F. Ole Oestmo; Skoftestad H.	France; Auguste Cavadini; Maxime Lardin; Maurice Marie Lecoq; Léon Moreaux; Violet A.
1898	(Italy) Turin	France; Allair; Dufier; Auguste Cavadini; Léon Moreaux; Achille Paroche	(Italy) Italy; Carassale L. Cerutti C. Magagnini A. Stefano Tirotti; Cesare Valerio	(Switzerland) Switzerland; Alcide Hirschy; Friedrich Lüthi; Frank Jullien; Louis Richardet; Konrad Stäheli
1899	(Netherlands) Loosduinen	(Switzerland) Switzerland; Franz Boeckli; Alfred Gruetter; Emil Kellenberger; Konrad Stäheli; Caspar Widmer	France; Maurice Marie Lecoq; Maxime Lardin; Léon Moreaux; Achille Paroche; Violet A.	(Denmark) Denmark; Alexander Viggo Jensen Rowing; Johansen J. Lars Jørgen Madsen; Anders Peter Nielsen; Laurids Peter Worslund Jernsen-Kjaer Dr.
1900	(France) Paris	(Switzerland) Switzerland; Franz Boeckli; Alfred Gruetter; Emil Kellenberger; Louis Richardet; Konrad Stäheli	(Norway) Norway; Olaf Emil Frydenlund; Helmer Hermandsen; Ole Andreas Saether; Ole Oestmo; Tom Seeberg	France; Auguste Cavadini; Maurice Marie Lecoq; Léon Moreaux; Achille Paroche; René Thomas
1901	(Switzerland) Luzern	(Switzerland) Switzerland; Alfred Gruetter; Emil Kellenberger; Heinrich Schellenberg; Roch A. Konrad Stäheli	(Netherlands) Netherlands; Koster G. de Block R. Antonius Hubertus Maria Bouwens; Uylke Vuurman; Henrik Sillem	France; Auguste Cavadini; Maxime Lardin; Maurice Marie Lecoq; Achille Paroche; Raphael Py
1902	(Italy) Rome	(Switzerland) Switzerland; Alfred Gruetter; Emil Kellenberger; Heinrich Schellenberg; Roch A. Konrad Stäheli	(Italy) Italy; Gian Galeazzo Cantoni; Daniele Bonicelli; Attilio Conti; Mollica R. Vittonatti P.	France; Auguste Cavadini; Maxime Lardin; Maurice Marie Lecoq; Léon Moreaux; Achille Paroche
1903	(Argentina) Buenos Aires	(Switzerland) Switzerland; Alfred Gruetter; Emil Kellenberger; Louis Richardet; Adolf Tobler; Wueger K.	(Italy) Italy; Attilio Conti; Pederzoli A. Tiberi A. Cesare Valerio; Vercellone C.	(Argentina) Argentina; Cabrera A. Chiappe Ducca J. Canale J. Martinez C. Jose Masso
1904	(France) Lyon	(Switzerland) Switzerland; Roch A. Louis Richardet; Heinrich Schellenberg; Jean Reich; Konrad Stäheli	(Italy) Italy; Daniele Bonicelli; Attilio Conti; Raffaele Frasca; Ricardo Ticchi; Cesare Valerio	France; Duret; Maurice Marie Lecoq; Achille Paroche; Léon Moreaux; Raphael Py
1905	(Belgium) Brussels	(Switzerland) Switzerland; Alfred Gruetter; Jaques F. Jean Reich; Louis Richardet; Konrad Stäheli	(Belgium) Belgium; Paul Van Asbroeck; Charles Paumier du Verger; Edouard Myin; François Rysheuvels van Den Branden	France; Eugène Balme; Albert Courquin; Jean Fouconnier; Maurice Marie Lecoq; Achille Paroche
1906	(Italy) Milan	(Switzerland) Switzerland; Marcel Meyer de Stadelhofen; Jean Reich; Louis Richardet; Konrad Stäheli; Ernst Stumpf	France; Eugène Balme; Albert Courquin; Husson; Maurice Marie Lecoq; Achille Paroche	(Belgium) Belgium; Paul Van Asbroeck de Ribaucourt; Edouard Myin; Charles Paumier du Verger; Edouard Poty
1907	(Switzerland) Zurich	(Switzerland) Switzerland; Mathias Brunner; Jean Reich; Marcel Meyer de Stadelhofen; Konrad Stäheli; Ernst Stumpf	(Belgium) Belgium; Paul Van Asbroeck de Ribaucorut; Charles Paumier du Verger; Edouard Myin van Den Branden	France; Eugène Balme; Albert Courquin; Husson; Maurice Marie Lecoq; Achille Paroche
1908	(Austria) Vienna	(Switzerland) Switzerland; Marcel Meyer de Stadelhofen; Louis Richardet; Jean Reich; Konrad Stäheli; Caspar Widmer	(Italy) Italy; Daniele Bonicelli; Attilio Conti; Raffaele Frasca; Carlo Ernesto Panza; Ricardo Ticchi	France; Andre Angelini; Albert Courquin; Léon Johnson; André Parmentier; Achille Paroche
1909	(Germany) Hamburg	(Switzerland) Switzerland; Marcel Meyer de Stadelhofen; Louis Richardet; Jean Reich; Konrad Stäheli; Caspar Widmer	France; Albert Courquin; Léon Johnson; Husson; Achille Paroche; André Parmentier	(Belgium) Belgium; Paul Van Asbroeck; Joseph Geens de Ribaucourt; Charles Scheirlinckx; Henri Sauveur Fils
1910	(Netherlands) Loosduinen	(Switzerland) Switzerland; Marcel Meyer de Stadelhofen; Jean Reich; Konrad Stäheli; Ernst Stumpf; Caspar Widmer	France; Albert Courquin; Léon Johnson; Husson; Achille Paroche; André Parmentier	(Belgium) Belgium; Paul Van Asbroeck; Jules Bury; Charles Paumier du Verger; Charles Scheirlinckx; Henri Sauveur Fils
1911	(Italy) Rome	(Switzerland) Switzerland; Jakob Bryner; Mathias Brunner; Jean Reich; Konrad Stäheli; Caspar Widmer	France; Paul Rene Colas; Albert Courquin; Husson; Achille Paroche; André Parmentier	(Belgium) Belgium; Paul Van Asbroeck; Joseph Geens; Charles Paumier du Verger; Henri Sauveur Fils; Charles Scheirlinckx
1912	(France) Bayonne, Biarritz	(Switzerland) Switzerland; Caspar Widmer; Fritz Kuchen; Mathias Brunner; Marcel Meyer de Stadelhofen; Konrad Stäheli	France; Paul Rene Colas; Albert Courquin; Husson; Léon Johnson; André Parmentier	(Netherlands) Netherlands; Antonius Hubertus Maria Bouwens; Brussard B. Antonie Willem Jan de Gee; Uylke Vuurman; Gerard Anne van Den Bergh
1913	(United States) Camp Perry	(Switzerland) Switzerland; Mathias Brunner; Jean Reich; Konrad Stäheli; Caspar Widmer; Uhler E.	France; Eugène Balme; Paul Rene Colas; Albert Courquin; Léon Johnson; Achille Paroche	United States; Ernest Eddy; Heidenreich F. John Kneubel; Long C. Sweeting E.
1914	(Denmark) Viborg	(Switzerland) Switzerland; Mathias Brunner; Fritz Kuchen; Marcel Meyer de Stadelhofen; Konrad Stäheli; Caspar Widmer	France; Albert Courquin; Rene Georges; Husson; André Parmentier; Achille Paroche	(Denmark) Denmark; Niels Andersen; Madsen K. Lars Jørgen Madsen; Anders Martinus Petersen; Anders Peter Nielsen
1921	(France) Lyon	United States; James Christian; Morris Fisher; Carl Townsend Osburn; Arthur Rothrock D. Walter Raymond Stokes	(Switzerland) Switzerland; Gustave Amoudruz; Josias Hartmann; Hans Haenni; Zaech E. Karl Zimmermann	France; Paul Rene Colas; Léon Johnson; André Parmentier; Louis Percy; Georges Roes
1922	(Italy) Milan	United States; John Keith Boles; Morris Fisher; Calvin Lloyd; Carl Townsend Osburn; Walter Raymond Stokes	(Switzerland) Switzerland; Josias Hartmann; Walter Lienhard; Hans Pfeiderer; Arnold Roesli; Karl Zimmermann	(Denmark) Denmark; Hansen S. Niels Hansen Ditlev Larsen; Niels Laursen; Lars Jørgen Madsen; Erik Sætter-Lassen
1923	(United States) Camp Perry	United States; John Keith Boles; Morris Fisher; Carl Townsend Osburn; Walter Raymond Stokes; Laurence Adam Nuesslein		
1924	(France) Reims	United States; John Keith Boles; Raymond Orville Coulter; Morris Fisher; Carl Townsend Osburn; Walter Raymond Stokes	(Switzerland) Switzerland; Josias Hartmann; Walter Lienhard; Jakob Reich; Hans Pfeiderer; Karl Zimmermann	France; Raymond Durand; Louis Gouery; Léon Johnson; Georges Roes; Émile Rumeau
1925	(Switzerland) St. Gallen	(Switzerland) Switzerland; Josias Hartmann; Walter Lienhard; Pelli G. Jakob Reich; Karl Zimmermann	United States; John Keith Boles; Raymond Orville Coulter; Manning Dodson; Morris Fisher; Morgan A.	(Denmark) Denmark; Jensen C. Niels Laursen; Niels Hansen Ditlev Larsen; Pedersen P. J. Erik Sætter-Lassen
1927	(Italy) Rome	(Switzerland) Switzerland; Josias Hartmann; Walter Lienhard; Fritz Kuchen; Pelli G. Karl Zimmermann	(Sweden) Sweden; Olle Ericsson; Ericsson M. Knut Viktor Knutsson; Ohlsson E. Ivar Wester K.	United States; William Bruce; Raymond Orville Coulter; Manning Dodson; Pedro Martin; Laurence Adam Nuesslein
1928	(Netherlands) Loosduinen	(Switzerland) Switzerland; Josias Hartmann; Walter Lienhard; Pelli G. Jakob Reich; Karl Zimmermann	(Sweden) Sweden; Gustaf Emil Andersson; Olle Ericsson; Mauritz Eriksson; Ohlsson E. Ivar Wester K.	United States; William Bruce; Marcus William Dinwiddie; Sidney Ray Hinds; Russell Seitzinger; Woods P.
1929	(Sweden) Stockholm	(Switzerland) Switzerland; Josias Hartmann; Walter Lienhard; Jakob Reich; Ernst Tellenbach; Karl Zimmermann	United States; Blakley J. Harry Renshaw; Thomas Sharpe J. Russell Seitzinger; Woods P.	(Sweden) Sweden; Gustaf Emil Andersson; Mauritz Eriksson; Olle Ericsson; Emrik Karlsson; Ohlsson E.
1930	(Belgium) Antwerp	United States; Morris Fisher; Harry Renshaw; Russell Seitzinger; Thomas Sharpe J. Emmet Oscar Swanson	(Switzerland) Switzerland; Fernand Demierre; Josias Hartmann; Jakob Reich; Ernst Tellenbach; Karl Zimmermann	(Finland) Finland; Kullervo Leskinen; Sven Oscar Lindgren; Einari Oksa; Niilo Talvenheimo; Toivonen E.
1931	(Poland) Lvov	(Switzerland) Switzerland; Fernand Demierre; Walter Lienhard; Jakob Reich; Albert Salzmann; Karl Zimmermann	(Finland) Finland; Kullervo Leskinen; Sven Oscar Lindgren; Einari Oksa; Johan Albert Ravila; Niilo Talvenheimo	(Norway) Norway; Mauritz Amundsen; Johannes Groenli; Glomnes S. Reidar Muslie; Willy Røgeberg
1933	(Spain) Granada	(Switzerland) Switzerland; Fernand Demierre; Josias Hartmann; Jakob Reich; Ernst Tellenbach; Karl Zimmermann	(Finland) Finland; Kullervo Leskinen; Sven Oscar Lindgren; Viktor Miinalainen; Einari Oksa; Osmo Rantala	(Sweden) Sweden; Gustaf Emil Andersson; Olle Ericsson; Eriksson T. Bertil Vilhelm Rönnmark; Nils Persson
1935	(Italy) Rome	(Finland) Finland; Kullervo Leskinen; Sven Oscar Lindgren; Viktor Miinalainen; Einari Oksa; Nisse Vasenius	(Estonia) Estonia; Elmar Kivistik; Jaak Kaerner; Endel Rikand; August Liivik; Ernst Rull	(Switzerland) Switzerland; Otto Horber; Jakob Reich; Albert Salzmann; Ernst Tellenbach; Karl Zimmermann
1937	(Finland) Helsinki	(Estonia) Estonia; Elmar Kivistik; Harald Kivioja; Gustav Lokotar; August Liivik; Alfred Kukk	(Finland) Finland; Olavi Elo; Kullervo Leskinen; Einari Oksa; Viktor Miinalainen; Nisse Vasenius	(Switzerland) Switzerland; Mario Ciocco; Emil Gruenig; Otto Horber; Albert Salzmann; Karl Zimmermann
1939	(Switzerland) Luzern	(Estonia) Estonia; Kaarel Kübar; Elmar Kivistik; Harald Kivioja; August Liivik; Gustav Lokotar	(Finland) Finland; Bruno Engelbrecht Frietsch; Olavi Elo; Olavi Onni Albin Hynninen; Pauli Aapeli Janhonen; Toivo Maenttaeri	(Switzerland) Switzerland; Josias Hartmann; Emil Gruenig; Otto Horber; Jakob Reich; Karl Zimmermann
1947	(Sweden) Stockholm	(Switzerland) Switzerland; Robert Bürchler; Emil Gruenig; Otto Horber; Werner Jakober; Schlapbach L.	(Finland) Finland; Olavi Elo; Bruno Engelbrecht Frietsch; Pauli Aapeli Janhonen; Kynninen O. Toivo Maenttaeri	(Sweden) Sweden; Uno Hilding Berg; Isac Holger Erben; Walther Sigfrid Fröstell; Kurt Johansson; Naumburg N.
1949	(Argentina) Buenos Aires	(Finland) Finland; Olavi Elo; Pauli Aapeli Janhonen; Kullervo Leskinen; Toivo Maenttaeri; Mikko Johannes Nordquist	(Switzerland) Switzerland; Robert Bürchler; Emil Gruenig; Werner Jakober; Otto Horber; Ernst Kramer	(Sweden) Sweden; Uno Hilding Berg; Isac Holger Erben; Walther Sigfrid Fröstell; Kurt Johansson; Jonas Jonsson
1952	(Norway) Oslo	(Switzerland) Switzerland; Robert Bürchler; Emil Gruenig; Otto Horber; Ernst Huber; August Hollenstein	(Sweden) Sweden; Uno Hilding Berg; Isac Holger Erben; Walther Sigfrid Fröstell; Kurt Johansson; Lindquist T.	(Finland) Finland; Pauli Aapeli Janhonen; Kullervo Leskinen; Mikko Johannes Nordquist; Jorma Tuomas Taitto; Vilho Ilmari Ylönen
1954	(Venezuela) Caracas	(Soviet Union) Soviet Union; Pyotr Avilov; Vasily Borisov; Anatoli Bogdanov; Moysey Itkis; Vladislav Krishnevsky	(Switzerland) Switzerland; Clavadetscher G. Robert Bürchler; August Hollenstein; Ernst Huber; Schmid E.	(Sweden) Sweden; Isac Holger Erben; Walther Sigfrid Fröstell; Kurt Johansson; Nils Johan Sundberg; Wiberg A.
1958	(Soviet Union) Moscow	(Soviet Union) Soviet Union; Pyotr Avilov; Vasily Borisov; Moysey Itkis; Vladislav Krishnevsky; Marat Niyazov	(Finland) Finland; Pauli Aapeli Janhonen; Esa Einari Kervinen; Mikko Johannes Nordquist; Jorma Tuomas Taitto; Vilho Ilmari Ylönen	(Hungary) Hungary; Imre Agoston; Ambrus Balogh; János Dosztály; Janos Holup; Sandor Krebs
1962	(Egypt) Cairo	(Soviet Union) Soviet Union; Moysey Itkis; Eduard Jarosh; Andrey Jakonyuk; Vladimir Yevdokimov	United States; Gary Anderson; Daniel Bruce Puckel; Tommy Pool; Verle Franklin Jun. Wright	(Switzerland) Switzerland; August Hollenstein; Kurt Mueller; Hans Rudolf Spillmann; Erwin Vogt
1966	(West Germany) Wiesbaden	United States; Gary Anderson; John Robert Foster; Margaret Thompson; Lones Wigger	(Soviet Union) Soviet Union; Vasily Borisov; Alexander Gerasimenok; Ludwig Lustberg; Marat Niyazov	(Switzerland) Switzerland; Karl Fitzi; Kurt Mueller; Hans Simonet; Erwin Vogt
1970	(United States) Phoenix	United States; John Robert Foster; Margaret Murdock; John Writer; Lones Wigger	(Soviet Union) Soviet Union; Valentin Kornev; Boris Melnik; Vitali Parkhimovitch; Sergei Yermilov	(Czechoslovakia) Czechoslovakia; Karel Bulan; Petr Kovářík; Rudolf Pojer; Antonín Schwarz
1974	(Switzerland) Thun	United States; Lanny Bassham; John Robert Foster; Lones Wigger; John Writer	(Soviet Union) Soviet Union; Vladimir Agishev; Valentin Kornev; Gennadi Lushikov; Boris Melnik	(Switzerland) Switzerland; Max Huerzeler; Charles Jermann; Martin Truttmann; Erwin Vogt
1978	(South Korea) Seoul	United States; Ray Carter; David Kimes; Lones Wigger; Webster Wright	(Switzerland) Switzerland; Kuno Bertschy; Charles Jermann; Walter Inderbitzin; Ueli Sarbach	(Finland) Finland; Osmo Ala-Honkola; Juhani Laakso; Jaakko Minkkinen; Mauri Roeppaenen
1982	(Venezuela) Caracas	(Soviet Union) Soviet Union; Victor Daniltchenko; Gennadi Larin; Gennadi Lushikov; Vladimir Lvov	United States; Ray Carter; Glenn Dubis; David Kimes; Lones Wigger	(Norway) Norway; Trond Kjoell; Geir Skirbekk; Harald Stenvaag; Kare Inge Viken
1986	(Sweden) Skövde	(Soviet Union) Soviet Union; Victor Daniltchenko; Gennadi Lushikov; Alexander Mitrofanov	United States; Robert Aylward; Glenn Dubis; Lones Wigger	(Norway) Norway; Geir Skirbekk; Harald Stenvaag; Kare Inge Viken
1990	(Soviet Union) Moscow	(Soviet Union) Soviet Union; Anatoli Klimenko; Igor Maksakov; Hrachya Petikyan	France; Pascal Bessy; Roger Chassat; Dominique Maquin	(Sweden) Sweden; Goran Jansson; Roger Jansson; Michael Larsson
1994	(Italy) Tolmezzo	(Belarus) Belarus; Anatoli Klimenko; Sergei Martynov; Georgi Nekhaev	(Finland) Finland; Harri Marjala; Tapio Säynevirta; Jukka Salonen	(Czech Republic) Czech Republic; Milan Bakeš; Petr Kůrka; Milan Mach
1998	(Spain) Zaragoza	United States; Glenn Dubis; Thomas Tamas; Stephen Goff	(Norway) Norway; Arild Roeyseth; Espen Berg-Knutsen; Thore Larsen	France; Pascal Bessy; Jean-Pierre Amat; Roger Chassat
2002	(Finland) Lahti	(Czech Republic) Czech Republic; Thomas Jerabek; Milan Mach; Lubos Opelka	United States; Michael Anti; Glenn Dubis; Eric Uptagrafft	(Norway) Norway; Thore Larsen; Arild Roeyseth; Magnus Wohlen
2006	(Croatia) Zagreb	(Norway) Norway; Espen Berg-Knutsen; Vebjørn Berg; Magnus Wohlen	(Austria) Austria; Mario Knögler; Thomas Farnik; Christian Planer	(Sweden) Sweden; Per Sandberg; Johan Gustafsson; Anders Brolund
2010	(Germany) Munich	(Switzerland) Switzerland; Marcel Bürge; Beat Müller; Simon Beyeler	France; Josselin Henry; Valérian Sauveplane; Cyril Graff	(Norway) Norway; Vebjørn Berg; Ole-Kristian Bryhn; Stian Bogar
2014	(Spain) Granada	(Switzerland) Switzerland; Marcel Bürge; Olivier Schaffter; Claude-Alain Delley	France; Josselin Henry; Valérian Sauveplane; Cyril Graff	(Norway) Norway; Odd Arne Brekne; Ole-Kristian Bryhn; Simon Claussen
2018	(South Korea) Changwon	(Austria) Austria; Gernot Rumpler; Bernhard Pickl; Stefan Rumpler	(Switzerland) Switzerland; Gilles Vincent Dufaux; Jan Lochbihler; Andrea Rossi	France; Alexis Raynaud; Michael d'Halluin; Valérian Sauveplane
2022	(Egypt) New Administrative Capital	France; Emilien Chassat; Michael d'Halluin; Dimitri Dutendas	Switzerland; Pascal Bachmann; Gilles Dufaux; Sandro Greuter	Austria; Patrick Diem; Bernhard Pickl; Alexander Schmirl

== World Championships, Women ==
Year	Place	Gold	Silver	Bronze
2002	(Finland) Lahti	Charlotte Jakobsen (DEN)	Helena Juppala (FIN)	Karin Hansen (DEN)
2006	(Croatia) Zagreb	Charlotte Jakobsen (DEN)	Tatsiana Kasiantsova (BLR)	Isabelle Grigorian (FRA)
2010	(Germany) Munich	Gyda Ellefsplass Olssen (NOR)	Charlotte Jakobsen (DEN)	Eva Friedel (GER)
2014	(Spain) Granada	Eva Rösken (GER)	Elin Åhlin (SWE)	Erin Mcneil (USA)
2018	(South Korea) Changwon	Lisa Müller (GER)	Jolyn Beer (GER)	Elin Åhlin (SWE)
2022	(Egypt) New Administrative Capital	Jeanette Hegg Duestad (NOR)	Sarina Hitz (SUI)	Elin Åhlin (SWE)

== World Championships, Women Team ==
Year	Place	Gold	Silver	Bronze
2002	(Finland) Lahti	(Denmark) Denmark; Anni Bissoe; Karin Hansen; Charlotte Jakobsen	(Sweden) Sweden; Marie Enqvist; Linda Harling; Berit Olsson	France; Laure Berthillier; Cecile Bessy; Christine Chuard
2006	(Croatia) Zagreb	France; Isabelle Grigorian; Christine Chuard; Solveig Bibard	(Switzerland) Switzerland; Andrea Brühlmann; Oriana Scheuss; Tanja Ruetti	(Denmark) Denmark; Charlotte Jakobsen; Karin Hansen; Pernille Pedersen
2010	(Germany) Munich	(Poland) Poland; Sylwia Bogacka; Karolina Kowalczyk; Alicja Ziaja	United States; Reya Kempley; Sandra Fong; Rhonda Bright	(Germany); Eva Friedel; Sonja Pfeilschifter; Beate Gauss
2014	(Spain) Granada	(Poland) Poland; Sylwia Bogacka; Karolina Kowalczyk; Paula Wrońska	(Switzerland) Switzerland; Marina Schnider; Bettina Bucher; Fabienne Fueglister	(Estonia) Estonia; Anzela Voronova; Liudmila Kortshagina; Elena Potasheva
2018	(South Korea) Changwon	(Germany); Lisa Müller; Jolyn Beer; Eva Rösken	(Austria) Austria; Franziska Peer; Olivia Hofmann; Nadine Ungerank	(Switzerland) Switzerland; Silvia Guignard; Marina Schnider; Andrea Brühlmann
2022	(Egypt) New Administrative Capital	Norway; Jeanette Hegg Duestad; Katrine Lund; Jenny Vatne	Switzerland; Silvia Guignard; Sarina Hitz; Anja Senti	Germany; Anna-Lena Geuther; Lisa Müller; Veronique Münster

== World Championships, Mixed Team ==
Year	Place	Gold	Silver	Bronze
2022	(Egypt) New Administrative Capital	Norway; Jeanette Hegg Duestad; Simon Claussen	Switzerland; Anja Senti; Pascal Bachmann	Poland; Karolina Kowalczyk; Daniel Romanczyk

== World Championships, total medals ==
Rank	Nation	Gold	Silver	Bronze	Total
1	Switzerland	44	29	29	102
2	United States	20	15	8	43
3	Soviet Union	9	7	1	17
4	Finland	8	15	7	30
5	France	6	14	15	35
6	Denmark	4	1	8	13
7	Estonia	4	1	3	8
8	Norway	2	5	6	13
9	Belgium	2	3	9	14
10	Germany	2	1	0	3
11	Sweden	1	4	11	16
12	Austria	1	2	1	4
13	Great Britain	1	1	1	3
14	Belarus	1	1	0	2
15	Czech Republic	1	0	2	3
16	Poland	1	0	0	1
16	Slovenia	1	0	0	1
18	Italy	0	6	1	7
19	Netherlands	0	1	2	3
20	Hungary	0	1	1	2
21	Argentina	0	0	1	1
21	Czechoslovakia	0	0	1	1
Totals (22 entries)		108	107	107	322

Note that at the 1923 World Championship, only the gold medal was awarded in the team event.

== European Championships ==
The European Championships of this discipline were contested eleven times from 1959 through 1999.

== Current world records ==
Current world records in 300 metre rifle three positions
Men	Individual	1190	Michael d'Halluin (FRA)	September 25, 2019	Tolmezzo (ITA)
Men	Teams	3533	Norway (Claussen, Wear, Lund)	September 25, 2019	Tolmezzo (ITA)
Women	Individual	1181	Jolyn Beer (GER)	September 26, 2019	Tolmezzo (ITA)
Women	Teams	3518	Germany (Beer, Müller, Rösken)	September 26, 2019	Tolmezzo (ITA)

== See also ==
- European 300 m Rifle Championships
- European Shooting Confederation
- International Shooting Sport Federation
- ISSF shooting events
