= 1999 European 300 m Rifle Championships =

- Host city: Saint-Jean-de-Marsacq, France
- Level: Senior
- Events: 6 men (3 individual + 3 team)

The 1999 European 300 m Rifle Championships was the 11th edition of the 300 m rifle competition, European 300 m Rifle Championships, organised by the International Shooting Sport Federation as a stand-alone championships.

== Results ==
=== Men ===
Event	Gold		Silver		Bronze	
Event	Athletes	Pts	Athletes	Pts	Athletes	Pts
300 m rifle 3 positions	(Czech Republic) Radim Novak	1167	(France) Pascal Bessy	1166	(Sweden) Johan Gustafsson	1165
300 m rifle 3 positions, team	Czech Republic; Radim Novak; Milan Bakeš; Tomas Jerabek		Norway; Oivind Sirevaag; Thore Larsen; Geir Magne Rolland		France; Pascal Bessy; Roger Chassat; Jean-Charles Courel	
300 m rifle prone	(France) Pascal Bessy	598	(Finland) Juha Hirvi	598	(Sweden) Johan Gustafsson	598
300 m rifle prone, team	France; Pascal Bessy; Roger Chassat; Jean-Charles Courel		Italy; Roberto Vitobello; Roberto Facheris; Giuseppe Fent		Czech Republic; Radim Novak; Vaclav Becvar; Tomas Jerabek	
300 m rifle standard	(Czech Republic) Milan Bakeš	582	(Finland) Tapio Säynevirta	581	(Germany) Rudolf Krenn	581
300 m rifle standard, team	Norway; Tore Larsen; Geir-Magne Rolland; Öyving Sirevaag		Switzerland; Marcel Bürge; Norbert Sturny; Olivier Cottagnoud		Finland; Tapio Säynevirta; Juha Hirvi; Kari Pennanen	

== Medal table ==
Host country

#	Country	1st place, gold medalist(s)	2nd place, silver medalist(s)	3rd place, bronze medalist(s)	Tot.
1	Czech Republic	3	0	1	4
2	France	2	1	1	4
3	Norway	1	1	0	2
4	Finland	0	2	1	3
5	Italy	0	1	0	1
5	Switzerland	0	1	0	1
7	Sweden	0	0	2	2
8	Germany	0	0	1	1
Total		6	6	6	18

== See also ==
- European Shooting Confederation
- International Shooting Sport Federation
- ISSF shooting events
- List of medalists at the European Shooting Championships
- List of medalists at the European Shotgun Championships
