= 1991 European 300 m Rifle Championships =

- Host city: Winterthur, Switzerland
- Level: Senior
- Events: 10 men (5 individual + 5 team)

The 1991 European 300 m Rifle Championships was the 7th edition of the 300 m rifle competition, European 300 m Rifle Championships, organised by the International Shooting Sport Federation as a stand-alone championships.

== Results ==
=== Men ===
Event	Gold	Silver	Bronze
300 m rifle 3 positions	(Norway) Harald Stenvaag	(Sweden) Roger Jansson	(Finland) Tapio Säynevirta
300 m rifle 3 positions, team	Switzerland; Konrad Jäggi; Norbert Sturny; Olivier Cottagnoud	Sweden; Roger Jansson......	Finland; Tapio Säynevirta......
300 m rifle prone	(Switzerland) Konrad Jäggi	(Switzerland) Norbert Sturny	(Switzerland) Olivier Cottagnoud
300 m rifle prone, team	Switzerland; Norbert Sturny; Konrad Jäggi; Olivier Cottagnoud	Sweden; Christer Larsson; Michael Larsson...	Finland; Ralf Westerlund......
300 m rifle standard	(Finland) Kalle Leskinen	(Finland) Tapio Säynevirta	(Soviet Union) Igor Maksakov
300 m rifle standard, team	Finland; Kalle Leskinen; Tapio Säynevirta; Ralf Westerlund	Norway; Geir Magne Rolland; Trond Kjoell...	Soviet Union; Igor Maksakov......
300 m rifle standing	(Norway) Harald Stenvaag	(Czechoslovakia) Petr Kůrka	(Soviet Union) Sergey Brajiko
300 m rifle standing, team	Norway; Harald Stenvaag; Norbert Sturny; Konrad Jäggi	Soviet Union; Sergey Braiko; Anatoly Klimenko...	Sweden.........
300 m rifle kneeling	(Switzerland) Benno Schmid	(Sweden) Roger Jansson	(Switzerland) Norbert Sturny
300 m rifle kneeling, team	Switzerland; Benno Schmid; Norbert Sturny; Konrad Jäggi	Sweden; Roger Jansson......	France; Pascal Bessy; Roger Chassat...

== Medal table ==
Host country

#	Country	1st place, gold medalist(s)	2nd place, silver medalist(s)	3rd place, bronze medalist(s)	Tot.
1	Switzerland	5	1	2	8
2	Norway	3	1	0	4
3	Finland	2	1	3	6
4	Sweden	0	5	1	6
5	Soviet Union	0	1	3	4
6	Czechoslovakia	0	1	0	1
7	France	0	0	1	1
Total		10	10	10	30

== See also ==
- European Shooting Confederation
- International Shooting Sport Federation
- ISSF shooting events
- List of medalists at the European Shooting Championships
- List of medalists at the European Shotgun Championships
