= 1997 European 300 m Rifle Championships =

- Host city: Copenhagen, Denmark
- Level: Senior
- Events: 6 men (3 individual + 3 team)

The 1997 European 300 m Rifle Championships was the 10th edition of the 300 m rifle competition, European 300 m Rifle Championships, organised by the International Shooting Sport Federation as a stand-alone championships.

== Results ==
=== Men ===
Event	Gold	Silver	Bronze
300 m rifle 3 positions	(France) Pascal Bessy	(Switzerland) Daniel Burger	(Czech Republic) Petr Kůrka
300 m rifle 3 positions, team	Switzerland; Beat Stadler; Daniel Burger; Olivier Cottagnoud	Norway; Espen Berg-Knutsen; Geir Magne Rolland; Harald Stenvaag	France; Pascal Bessy; Roger Chassat; Jean-Charles Courel
300 m rifle prone	(Sweden) Michael Larsson	(Norway) Arild Royseth	(Finland) Kalle Leskinen
300 m rifle prone, team	Finland; Kalle Leskinen; Tapio Säynevirta; Jukka Salonen	Switzerland; Marcel Bürge; Olivier Cottagnoud; Daniel Burger	Norway; Arild Royseth; Espen Berg-Knutsen; Harald Stenvaag
300 m rifle standard	(Norway) Arild Royseth	(Norway) Espen Berg-Knutsen	(Sweden) Johan Gustavsson
300 m rifle standard, team	Norway; Arild Royseth; Espen Berg-Knutsen; Öyving Sirevaag	France; Pascal Bessy; Roger Chassat; Dominique Maquin	Germany; Friedel Roggendorf; Christian Bauer; Rudolf Krenn

== Medal table ==
#	Country	1st place, gold medalist(s)	2nd place, silver medalist(s)	3rd place, bronze medalist(s)	Tot.
1	Norway	2	3	1	6
2	Switzerland	1	2	0	3
3	France	1	1	1	3
4	Finland	1	0	1	2
4	Sweden	1	0	1	2
6	Czech Republic	0	0	1	1
6	Germany	0	0	1	1
Total		6	6	6	18

== See also ==
- European Shooting Confederation
- International Shooting Sport Federation
- ISSF shooting events
- List of medalists at the European Shooting Championships
- List of medalists at the European Shotgun Championships
