= 1995 European 300 m Rifle Championships =

- Host city: Boden, Sweden
- Level: Senior
- Events: 6 men (3 individual + 3 team)

The 1995 European 300 m Rifle Championships was the 9th edition of the 300 m rifle competition, European 300 m Rifle Championships, organised by the International Shooting Sport Federation as a stand-alone championships.

== Results ==
=== Men ===
Event	Gold	Silver	Bronze
300 m rifle 3 positions	(Czech Republic) Petr Kůrka	(Finland) Tapio Säynevirta	(Slovenia) Rajmond Debevec
300 m rifle 3 positions, team	Czech Republic; Petr Kůrka; Dalimil Nejezchleba; Milan Mach	Norway; Harald Stenvaag; Espen Berg-Knutsen; Trond Kjoell	Finland; Tapio Säynevirta; Ralf Westerlund; Jukka Salonen
300 m rifle prone	(Germany) Bernd Rücker	(Finland) Jukka Salonen	(Finland) Tapio Säynevirta
300 m rifle prone, team	Germany; Bernd Rücker; Friedel Roggendorf; Florian Hasler	Finland; Kalle Leskinen; Tapio Säynevirta; Jukka Salonen	Norway; Joern Dalen; Espen Berg-Knutsen; Harald Stenvaag
300 m rifle standard	(France) Roger Chassat	(Switzerland) Norbert Sturny	(Sweden) Mikael Larsson
300 m rifle standard, team	Switzerland; Norbert Sturny; Beat Stadler; Olivier Cottagnoud	Norway; Lars Nygaard; Espen Berg-Knutsen; Joern Dalen	Finland; Kalle Leskinen; Tapio Säynevirta; Jukka Salonen

== Medal table ==
Host country

#	Country	1st place, gold medalist(s)	2nd place, silver medalist(s)	3rd place, bronze medalist(s)	Tot.
1	Czech Republic	2	0	0	2
1	Germany	2	0	0	2
3	Switzerland	1	1	0	2
4	France	1	0	0	1
5	Finland	0	3	3	6
6	Norway	0	2	1	3
7	Sweden	0	0	1	1
7	Slovenia	0	0	1	1
Total		6	6	6	18

== See also ==
- European Shooting Confederation
- International Shooting Sport Federation
- ISSF shooting events
- List of medalists at the European Shooting Championships
- List of medalists at the European Shotgun Championships
