= 1993 European 300 m Rifle Championships =

- Host city: Thun, Switzerland
- Level: Senior
- Events: 6 men (3 individual + 3 team)

The 1993 European 300 m Rifle Championships was the 8th edition of the 300 m rifle competition, European 300 m Rifle Championships, organised by the International Shooting Sport Federation as a stand alone championships.

== Results ==
=== Men ===
Event	Gold	Silver	Bronze
300 m rifle 3 positions	(Switzerland) Olivier Cottagnoud	(Slovenia) Rajmond Debevec	(Switzerland) Norbert Sturny
300 m rifle 3 positions, team	Switzerland; Norbert Sturny; Olivier Cottagnoud; Thomas Köhler	Norway; Arild Roeyseth......	Finland; Tapio Säynevirta; Kalle Leskinen...
300 m rifle prone	(Switzerland) Olivier Cottagnoud	(Finland) Tapio Säynevirta	(Sweden) Christer Larsson
300 m rifle prone, team	Switzerland; Norbert Sturny; Olivier Cottagnoud; Thomas Köhler	Sweden; Christer Larsson......	Finland; Tapio Säynevirta......
300 m rifle standard	(Norway) Geir Magne Rolland	(Switzerland) Thomas Köhler	(France) Roger Chassat
300 m rifle standard, team	Switzerland; Norbert Sturny; Beat Stadler; Olivier Cottagnoud	Norway; Geir Magne Rolland......	France; Roger Chassat......

== Medal table ==
Host country

#	Country	1st place, gold medalist(s)	2nd place, silver medalist(s)	3rd place, bronze medalist(s)	Tot.
1	Switzerland	5	1	1	7
2	Norway	1	2	0	3
3	Finland	0	1	2	3
4	Sweden	0	1	1	2
5	Slovenia	0	1	0	1
6	France	0	0	2	2
Total		6	6	6	18

== See also ==
- European Shooting Confederation
- International Shooting Sport Federation
- ISSF shooting events
- List of medalists at the European Shooting Championships
- List of medalists at the European Shotgun Championships
