= 2002 ISSF World Shooting Championships =

International sport shooting competition

- Location: Lahti, Finland
- Dates: 2 – 16 July

The 48th ISSF World Shooting Championships were held in Lahti, Finland from July 2 to July 16, 2002.

Medal count – World records – Men's rifle events – Women's rifle events – Men's pistol events – Women's pistol events
Men's shotgun events – Women's shotgun events – Men's running target events – Women's running target events – External links

== Medal count ==
Rank	Country	Gold	Silver	Bronze	Total
1	Russia	21	16	14	51
2	China	17	18	11	46
3	Germany	14	12	8	34
4	Czech Republic	9	6	6	21
5	United States	6	11	10	27
6	Hungary	4	3	4	11
7	Switzerland	4	2	2	8
8	Norway	4	1	4	9
9	Denmark	4	1	1	6
10	Ukraine	3	5	8	16
11	South Korea	3	4	3	10
12	Kazakhstan	3	3	2	8
12	Slovakia	3	3	2	8
14	Italy	3	2	2	7
15	Poland	2	1	1	4
16	Finland	1	3	8	12
17	Belarus	1	2	1	4
18	France	1	1	5	7
19	Slovenia	1	1	0	2
20	Austria	1	0	2	3
20	Great Britain	1	0	2	3
22	Chinese Taipei	1	0	1	2
22	Kuwait	1	0	1	2
22	Ireland	1	0	0	1
25	Sweden	0	3	3	6
26	Australia	0	3	0	3
27	Israel	0	1	1	2
27	FR Yugoslavia	0	1	1	2
27	Turkey	0	1	1	2
30	Azerbaijan	0	1	0	1
30	Georgia	0	1	0	1
30	Lithuania	0	1	0	1
30	Spain	0	1	0	1
34	Croatia	0	0	1	1
34	Cyprus	0	0	1	1
34	Estonia	0	0	1	1
34	India	0	0	1	1

== World records ==
Several world records were equalled or bettered in Lahti. Especially in women's 300 m Rifle and women's running target, both non-Olympic (so there are few other occasions for them) and both relatively new on the program, were records wiped away.

Event	Score	Competitor	Nationality
Men's individual world records
300 m Standard Rifle	589 (Equalled)	Marcel Bürge	Switzerland
25 m Center-Fire Pistol	590 (Equalled)	Park Byung Taek	South Korea
10 m Running Target (Qualification round)	588 (Equalled)	Yang Ling	China
Women's individual world records
300 m Rifle Three Positions	588	Charlotte Jakobsen	Denmark
300 m Rifle Prone	594	Charlotte Jakobsen	Denmark
50 m Rifle Prone	597 (Equalled)	Olga Dovgun	Kazakhstan
10 m Running Target	391	Xu Xuan	China
10 m Running Target Mixed	390	Audrey Soquet	France
Junior Men's individual world records
25 m Standard Pistol	574	Denis Kulakov	Russia
10 m Running Target Mixed	384 (Equalled)	Dmitry Romanov	Russia
Junior Women's individual world records
Trap	67	Sun Dongni	China
10 m Running Target	391	Xu Xuan	China
Men's team world records
300 m Rifle Three Positions	3511	Czech Republic	
300 m Standard Rifle	1744	Switzerland	
10 m Air Rifle	1785	Russia	
10 m Running Target	1733	Germany	
Women's team world records
300 m Rifle Three Positions	1726	Denmark; Sweden (tied)	
10 m Air Rifle	1190	China	
10 m Running Target	1150	China	
10 m Running Target Mixed	1149	China	
Junior Men's team world records
10 m Air Rifle	1771	China	
Junior Women's team world records
10 m Air Pistol	1146	China	
10 m Running Target Mixed	1098	Russia	

== Rifle ==
=== Men ===
Pos	Individual			Team		Junior			Junior Team	
Men's 300 m Rifle Three Positions
Gold	Rajmond Debevec	Slovenia	1168	Czech Republic	3511					
Silver	Eric Uptagrafft	United States	1165	United States	3499					
Bronze	Thomas Jerabek	Czech Republic	1163	Norway	3491					
Men's 300 m Rifle Prone
Gold	Norbert Sturny	Switzerland	597	Norway	1785					
Silver	Thomas Jerabek	Czech Republic	597	United States	1783					
Bronze	Michael Larsson	Sweden	597	Sweden	1783					
Men's 300 m Standard Rifle
Gold	Marcel Bürge	Switzerland	589	Switzerland	1744					
Silver	Milan Mach	Czech Republic	585	Czech Republic	1738					
Bronze	Arild Røyseth	Norway	583	United States	1738					
Men's 50 m Rifle Three Positions
Gold	Marcel Bürge	Switzerland	1258.0	Russia	3483	Denis Sokolov	Russia	1160	Germany	3443
Silver	Konstantin Prikhodtchenko	Russia	1255.4	United States	3482	Dirk Leiwen	Germany	1159	Russia	3432
Bronze	Péter Sidi	Hungary	1250.7	Ukraine	3470	Liu Tianyou	China	1157	Czech Republic	3417
Men's 50 m Rifle Prone
Gold	Matthew Emmons	United States	699.7	Norway	1774	Joseph Hein; Zoltan Torok	United States; Hungary	589; 589	Germany	1748
Silver	Rajmond Debevec	Slovenia	698.8	Ukraine	1769	Christian Lejon	Sweden	588	Russia	1748
Bronze	Espen Berg-Knutsen	Norway	698.3	Russia	1765	Dragan Marković	FR Yugoslavia	587	United States	1745
Men's 10 m Air Rifle
Gold	Jason Parker	United States	699.9	Russia	1785	Dirk Leiwen	Germany	593	China	1771
Silver	Li Jie	China	699.9	China	1784	Fei Fan	China	592	Germany	1765
Bronze	Yevgeni Aleinikov	Russia	699.1	United States	1781	Ryan Tanoue	United States	592	United States	1759

=== Women ===
Pos	Individual			Team		Junior			Junior Team	
Women's 300 m Rifle Three Positions
Gold	Charlotte Jakobsen	Denmark	588	Denmark	1726					
Silver	Ang Chee Hian	Finland	584	Sweden	1726					
Bronze	Karin Hansen	Denmark	579	France	1716					
Women's 300 m Rifle Prone
Gold	Charlotte Jakobsen	Denmark	594	Norway	1758					
Silver	Estelle Preti	Switzerland	593	France	1756					
Bronze	Lindy Hansen	Norway	590	Sweden	1756					
Women's 50 m Rifle Three Positions
Gold	Petra Horneber	Germany	675.5	Ukraine	1737	Dorothee Bauer	Germany	587	Germany	1734
Silver	Natalia Kalnish	Ukraine	674.1	Germany	1732	Jamie Beyerle	United States	578	Slovenia	1709
Bronze	Martina Prekel	Germany	673.0	Russia	1720	Wang Chengyi	China	576	Russia	1705
Women's 50 m Rifle Prone
Gold	Olga Dovgun	Kazakhstan	597	Finland	1756	Daniela Peskova	Slovakia	588	Slovakia	1747
Silver	Wang Xian	China	593	Denmark	1753	Dorothee Bauer	Germany	588	Russia	1742
Bronze	Natalia Kalnish	Ukraine	591	Germany	1753	Raj Kumari	India	586	United States	1742
Women's 10 m Air Rifle
Gold	Kateřina Kůrková	Czech Republic	502.1	China	1190	Dorothee Bauer	Germany	397	Russia	1177
Silver	Du Li	China	500.9	South Korea	1188	Sun Xin	China	397	Germany	1177
Bronze	Sonja Pfeilschifter	Germany	500.3	Ukraine	1185	Christina Deiser	Austria	397	Israel	1176

== Pistol ==
=== Men ===
Pos	Individual			Team		Junior			Junior Team	
Men's 50 m Pistol
Gold	Tan Zongliang	China	662.7	China	1699	Vladimir Issachenko	Kazakhstan	563	Ukraine	1627
Silver	Martin Tenk	Czech Republic	660.3	Russia	1685	Christoph Schmid	Switzerland	555	South Korea	1617
Bronze	Vladimir Gontcharov	Russia	657.7	Ukraine	1671	Serdar Demirel	Turkey	553	Switzerland	1615
Men's 25 m Rapid Fire Pistol
Gold	Marco Spangenberg	Germany	690.9	Germany	1761	Martin Behrendt	Germany	582	Germany	1720
Silver	Ralf Schumann	Germany	690.9	China	1755	Thomas Müller	Germany	582	Russia	1698
Bronze	Niki Marty	Switzerland	688.3	Ukraine	1743	Martin Podhráský	Czech Republic	576	France	1684
Men's 25 m Center-Fire Pistol						Junior Men's 25 m Pistol				
Gold	Park Byung Taek	South Korea	590	South Korea	1760	Denis Kulakov	Russia	579	Kazakhstan	1723
Silver	Mikhail Nestruev	Russia	589	Norway	1747	Vladimir Issachenko	Kazakhstan	579	Russia	1718
Bronze	Lee Sang Hak	South Korea	586	Ukraine	1743	Sergey Vokhmianin	Kazakhstan	577	Estonia	1690
Men's 25 m Standard Pistol
Gold	Rene Vogn	Denmark	580	Austria	1708	Denis Kulakov	Russia	574	Russia	1654
Silver	Alexander Danilov	Israel	580	South Korea	1706	Vladimir Issachenko	Kazakhstan	561	Kazakhstan	1646
Bronze	Giovanni Bossi	Austria	579	China	1705	Julien Dufour	France	557	France	1638
Men's 10 m Air Pistol
Gold	Mikhail Nestruev	Russia	685.3	Russia	1745	Denis Kulakov	Russia	580	South Korea	1721
Silver	Andrija Zlatić	FR Yugoslavia	683.9	China	1737	Park Ji Su	South Korea	580	Russia	1707
Bronze	Franck Dumoulin	France	683.4	Ukraine	1735	Sebastian Rosner	Germany	575	Germany	1706

=== Women ===
Pos	Individual			Team		Junior			Junior Team	
Women's 25 m Pistol
Gold	Munkhbayar Dorjsuren	Germany	689.9	China	1746	Fei Fengji	China	581	China	1713
Silver	Irada Ashumova	Azerbaijan	687.3	Russia	1732	Wang Riu	China	577	Hungary	1680
Bronze	Chen Ying	China	687.2	United States	1729	Baek Seong Min	South Korea	574	Germany	1679
Women's 10 m Air Pistol
Gold	Olena Kostevych	Ukraine	485.2	Russia	1145	Katarzyna Szymanska	Poland	384	China	1146
Silver	Nino Salukvadze	Georgia	484.9	Belarus	1141	Fei Fengji	China	383	Poland	1136
Bronze	Olga Kuznetsova	Russia	484.8	China	1140	Wang Riu	China	382	Russia	1127

== Shotgun ==
=== Men ===
Pos	Individual			Team		Junior			Junior Team	
Men's Trap
Gold	Khaled Al-Mudhaf	Kuwait	146	Ireland	357	Edward Ling	Great Britain	119	Italy	344
Silver	Michael Diamond	Australia	144	Australia	352	Oguzhan Tuzun	Turkey	119	United States	326
Bronze	Giovanni Pellielo	Italy	144	Finland	351	Giovanni Cernogoraz	Croatia	119	Finland	324
Men's Double Trap
Gold	Daniele Di Spigno	Italy	188	Italy	415	Adam Curtis	United States	134	United States	378
Silver	Walton Eller	United States	187	China	408	Stefano Ales	Italy	132	Italy	373
Bronze	Joonas Olkkonen	Finland	187	Kuwait	408	Hubert Olejnik	Poland	131	Great Britain	349
Men's Skeet
Gold	Harald Jensen	Norway	147	Czech Republic	355	Ales Hutar	Czech Republic	118	Germany	347
Silver	Valeriy Shomin	Russia	147	United States	355	Ralf Buchheim	Germany	118	Finland	345
Bronze	Ennio Falco	Italy	146	Russia	354	Vesa Lautamatti	Finland	117	Cyprus	339

=== Women ===
Pos	Individual			Team		Junior			Junior Team	
Women's Trap
Gold	Elena Tkach	Russia	93	Russia	199	Sun Dongni	China	67		
Silver	Daina Gudzinevičiūtė	Lithuania	92	Spain	198	Tatiana Barsuk	Russia	64		
Bronze	Wang Yujin	China	91	China	198	Zuzana Štefečeková	Slovakia	63		
Women's Double Trap
Gold	Lin Yi-chun	Chinese Taipei	143	China	313	Dai Qi Wen	China	104		
Silver	Wang Jing Lin	China	142	United States	301	Huang Bei	China	103		
Bronze	Son Hye Kyoung	South Korea	142	Chinese Taipei	298	Kirby Anderson	United States	94		
Women's Skeet
Gold	Diána Igaly	Hungary	98	China	202	Lenka Bartekova	Slovakia	72	United States	189
Silver	Andrea Stranovská	Slovakia	95	Russia	199	Natalia Rahman	Australia	66	Slovenia	187
Bronze	Elena Little	Great Britain	92	Hungary	198	Yulia Nefedova	Russia	66	Russia	177

== Running target ==
=== Women ===
Pos	Individual			Team		Junior			Junior Team	
Women's 10 m Running Target
Gold	Xu Xuan	China	391	China	1150	Volha Markava	Belarus	379	Russia	1087
Silver	Wang Xia	China	381	Ukraine	1099	Voktoriya Zabolotna	Ukraine	377	Belarus	1075
Bronze	Natalya Kovalenko	Kazakhstan	380	Russia	1084	Ma Lin	China	376	Germany	1039
Women's 10 m Running Target Mixed
Gold	Audrey Soquet	France	390	China	1149	Ma Lin	China	377	Russia	1098
Silver	Qiu Zhiqi	China	385	Germany	1101	Darya Lagosha	Ukraine	375	Germany	1076
Bronze	Wang Xia	China	383	Ukraine	1084	Julia Eydenzon	Russia	374	Belarus	1067

== Notes and references ==
- Full results (ISSF website)
