= 300 m rifle prone =

Sport shooting discipline

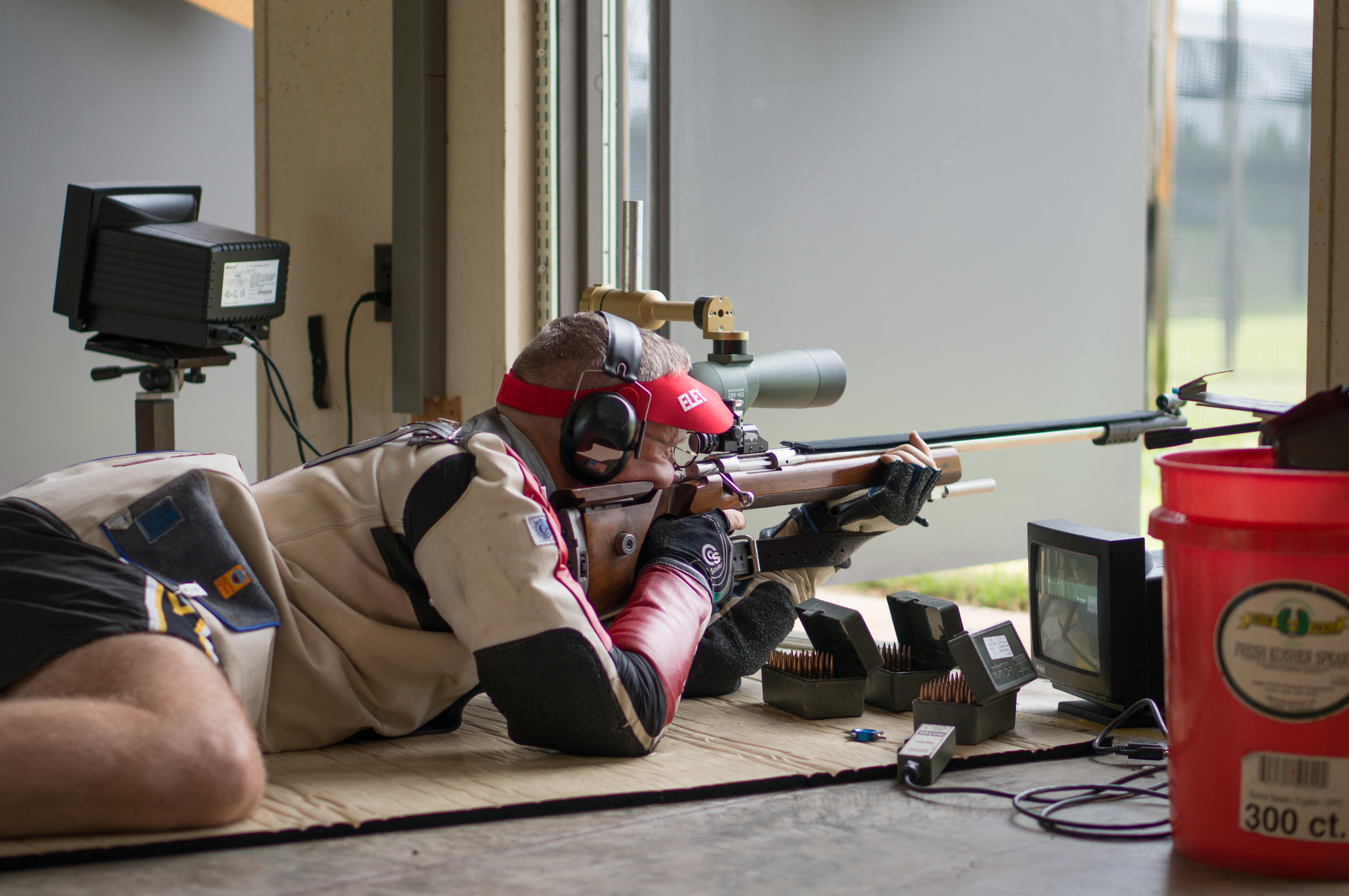

Men
- Number of shots: 60
- World Championships: Since 1982
- Abbreviation: 300FR60PR

Women
- Number of shots: 60
- World Championships: Since 2002
- Abbreviation: 300R60PR

300 m rifle prone (formerly known as one of four free rifle disciplines) is an ISSF shooting event. It was added to the World Championship program in 1982, and was based on the English Match but shot with the same full-power rifle as in 300 metre rifle three positions. The course of fire, like in the small-bore 50 metre rifle prone, is 60 shots for both men and women.

300 m rifle has been a declining event for many decades because of the considerable cost for competing in the event and the difficulty of creating ranges for it. 300 metre Rifle is still on the World and regional championships program, though.

== World Championships, Men ==
Year	Place	Gold	Silver	Bronze
1982	(Venezuela) Caracas	Victor Daniltchenko (URS)	Malcolm Cooper (GBR)	Ernest van de Zande (USA)
1986	(Sweden) Skövde	Malcolm Cooper (GBR)	Pekka Roeppaenen (FIN)	Glenn Dubis (USA)
1990	(Soviet Union) Moscow	Harald Stenvaag (NOR)	Norbert Sturny (SUI)	Thomas Tamas (USA)
1994	(Italy) Tolmezzo	Bernd Ruecker (GER)	Petr Kůrka (CZE)	Roger Chassat (FRA)
1998	(Spain) Zaragoza	Bengt Andersson (SWE)	Tapio Säynevirta (FIN)	Glenn Dubis (USA)
2002	(Finland) Lahti	Norbert Sturny (SUI)	Thomas Jerabek (CZE)	Michael Larsson (SWE)
2006	(Croatia) Zagreb	Lubos Opelka (CZE)	Péter Sidi (HUN)	Rajmond Debevec (SLO)
2010	(Germany) Munich	Stefan Raser (AUT)	Vebjørn Berg (NOR)	Marcel Zobrist (SUI)
2014	(Spain) Granada	Valérian Sauveplane (FRA)	Johan Gustafsson (SWE)	Michael Mcphail (USA)
2018	(South Korea) Changwon	Rajmond Debevec (SLO)	Daniel Romańczyk (POL)	Josip Kuna (CRO)
2022	(Egypt) New Administrative Capital	Simon Claussen (NOR)	Tomasz Bartnik (POL)	Alexander Schmirl (AUT)

== World Championships, Men Team ==
Year	Place	Gold	Silver	Bronze
1982	(Venezuela) Caracas	(Soviet Union) Soviet Union; Victor Daniltchenko; Gennadi Lushikov; Vladimir Lvov; Viktor Vlasov	(Switzerland) Switzerland; Kuno Bertschy; Walter Inderbitzin; Anton Mueller; Ueli Sarbach	(Norway) Norway; Tore Hartz; Terje Melbye-Hansen; Geir Skirbekk; Kare Inge Viken
1986	(Sweden) Skövde	France; Pascal Bessy; Michel Bury; Dominique Maquin	(Finland) Finland; Kalle Leskinen; Mauri Roeppaenen; Pekka Roeppaenen	(Norway) Norway; Joern Dalen; Harald Stenvaag; Kare Inge Viken
1990	(Soviet Union) Moscow	(Norway) Norway; Joern Dalen; Geir Magne Rolland; Harald Stenvaag	United States; Bradley Carnes; Glenn Dubis; Thomas Tamas	(United Kingdom) Great Britain; Malcolm Cooper; John Davis; Michael Sullivan
1994	(Italy) Tolmezzo	(Finland) Finland; Kalle Leskinen; Tapio Säynevirta; Jukka Salonen	(Czech Republic) Czech Republic; Milan Bakeš; Petr Kůrka; Milan Mach	(Switzerland) Switzerland; Olivier Cottagnoud; Eric Chollet-Durand; Norbert Sturny
1998	(Spain) Zaragoza	(Sweden) Sweden; Bengt Andersson; Jonas Edman; Michael Larsson	(Norway) Norway; Espen Berg-Knutsen; Arild Roeyseth; Thore Larsen	France; Pascal Bessy; Jean-Pierre Amat; Roger Chassat
2002	(Finland) Lahti	(Norway) Norway; Vebjørn Berg; Per-Gunnar Bund; Arild Roeyseth	United States; Glenn Dubis; Thomas Tamas; Eric Uptagrafft	(Sweden) Sweden; Anders Brandt; Johan Gustafsson; Michael Larsson
2006	(Croatia) Zagreb	(Norway) Norway; Vebjørn Berg; Espen Berg-Knutsen; Magnus Wohlen	(Sweden) Sweden; Johan Gustafsson; Per Sandberg; Michael Larsson	(Australia) Australia; Warren Potent; Maris Taylor; David Hollister
2010	(Germany) Munich	(United Kingdom) Great Britain; Tony Lincoln; Harry Creevy; Simon Aldhouse	(Austria) Austria; Stefan Raser; Christian Planer; Michael Podolak	France; Josselin Henry; Valérian Sauveplane; Guillaume Bigot
2014	(Spain) Granada	(Norway) Norway; Stian Bogar; Odd Arne Brekne; Ole-Kristian Bryhn	United States; Eric Uptagrafft; Joseph Hein; Michael McPhail	France; Cyril Graff; Josselin Henry; Valérian Sauveplane
2018	(South Korea) Changwon	France; Remi Moreno Flores; Valérian Sauveplane; Michael d'Halluin	(Switzerland) Switzerland; Gilles Vincent Dufaux; Jan Lochbihler; Marcel Ackermann	(Norway) Norway; Stian Bogar; Odd Arne Brekne; Ole-Kristian Bryhn
2022	(Egypt) New Administrative Capital	Denmark; Carsten Brandt; Jens-Ulrik Ladekjaer-Mikkelsen; Steffen Olsen	Switzerland; Pascal Bachmann; Gilles Dufaux; Sandro Greuter	Poland; Tomasz Bartnik; Maciej Kowalewicz; Daniel Romańczyk

== World Championships, Women ==
Year	Place	Gold	Silver	Bronze
2002	(Finland) Lahti	Charlotte Jakobsen (DEN)	Estelle Preti (SUI)	Lindy Hansen (NOR)
2006	(Croatia) Zagreb	Solveig Bibard (FRA)	Marina Giannini (ITA)	Charlotte Jakobsen (DEN)
2010	(Germany) Munich	Bettina Bucher (SUI)	Charlotte Jakobsen (DEN)	Catherine Houlmont (FRA)
2014	(Spain) Granada	Charlotte Jakobsen (DEN)	Eva Rösken (GER)	Anzela Voronova (EST)
2018	(South Korea) Changwon	Bae So-hee (KOR)	Eva Rösken (GER)	Silvia Guignard (SUI)
2022	(Egypt) New Administrative Capital	Anja Senti (SUI)	Silvia Guignard (SUI)	Olivia Hofmann (AUT)

== World Championships, Women Team ==
Year	Place	Gold	Silver	Bronze
2002	(Finland) Lahti	(Norway) Norway; Lindy Hansen; Birgit Roenningen; Hanne Skarpodde	France; Laure Berthillier; Cecile Bessy; Christine Chuard	(Sweden) Sweden; Annelie Bohlin; Marie Enqvist; Linda Harling
2006	(Croatia) Zagreb	United States; Nicole Allaire; Janet Raab; Reya Kempley	France; Solveig Bibard; Christine Chuard; Isabelle Grigorian	(Denmark) Denmark; Charlotte Jakobsen; Karin Hansen; Pernille Pedersen
2010	(Germany) Munich	France; Catherine Houlmont; Olivia Goberville; Christine Chuard	(Germany); Eva Friedel; Harriet Holzberger; Gudrun Wittmann	(Poland) Poland; Sylwia Bogacka; Karolina Kowalczyk; Alicja Ziaja
2014	(Spain) Granada	(Sweden) Sweden; Marie Enqvist; Anna Normann; Elin Åhlin	(Germany); Eva Rösken; Gudrun Wittmann; Sandra Georg	France; Olivia Goberville; Catherine Houlmont; Christine Chuard
2018	(South Korea) Changwon	(Germany); Eva Rösken; Lisa Müller; Jolyn Beer	(South Korea) South Korea; Bae So-hee; Eum Bit-na; Bae Sang-hee	(Switzerland) Switzerland; Silvia Guignard; Andrea Brühlmann; Marina Schnider
2022	(Egypt) New Administrative Capital	Norway; Jeanette Hegg Duestad; Katrine Lund; Jenny Vatne	Switzerland; Silvia Guignard; Sarina Hitz; Anja Senti	Germany; Anna-Lena Geuther; Lisa Müller; Veronique Münster

== World Championships, Mixed Team ==
Year	Place	Gold	Silver	Bronze
2022	(Egypt) New Administrative Capital	Norway; Jeanette Hegg Duestad; Simon Claussen	Switzerland; Anja Senti; Pascal Bachmann	Poland; Karolina Kowalczyk; Daniel Romanczyk

== World Championships, total medals ==
Rank	Nation	Gold	Silver	Bronze	Total
1	Norway	6	2	4	12
2	France	5	2	6	13
3	Sweden	3	2	3	8
4	Switzerland	2	4	4	10
5	Germany	2	4	0	6
6	Denmark	2	1	2	5
7	Great Britain	2	1	1	4
8	Soviet Union	2	0	0	2
9	United States	1	3	5	9
10	Czech Republic	1	3	0	4
10	Finland	1	3	0	4
12	Austria	1	1	0	2
12	South Korea	1	1	0	2
14	Slovenia	1	0	1	2
15	Poland	0	1	1	2
16	Hungary	0	1	0	1
16	Italy	0	1	0	1
18	Australia	0	0	1	1
18	Croatia	0	0	1	1
18	Estonia	0	0	1	1
Totals (20 entries)		30	30	30	90

== Current world records ==
Current world records in 300 metre rifle prone
Men	Individual	600	Harald Stenvaag (NOR); Bernd Rücker (GER); Josselin Henry (FRA); Vebjørn Berg (NOR); Stefan Raser (AUT); Remi Moreno Flores (FRA); Karl Olsson (SWE)	15 August 1990; 31 July 1994; 5 August 2010; 5 August 2010; 27 July 2015; 23 September 2019; 23 September 2019	Moscow (URS); Tolmezzo (ITA); Munich (GER); Munich (GER); Maribor (SLO); Tolmezzo (ITA); Tolmezzo (ITA)
Men	Teams	1796	Sweden (Olsson, Sandberg, Gustafsson)	23 September 2019	Tolmezzo (ITA)
Women	Individual	599	Charlotte Jakobsen (DEN); Bettina Bucher (SWI); Charlotte Jakobsen (DEN); Seonaid McIntosh (GBR)	21 July 2009; 9 August 2010; 23 September 2019; 24 September 2019	Osijek (CRO); Munich (GER); Tolmezzo (ITA); Tolmezzo (ITA)
Women	Teams	1787	France (Houlmont, Goberville, Chuard)	9 August 2010	Munich (GER)

== See also ==
- European Shooting Confederation
- International Shooting Sport Federation
- ISSF shooting events
- 1959 European 300 m Rifle Championships
