= Kärner =

Family name

Kärner is a common Estonian surname (meaning "gardener"), with notable bearers including:

- Aleksander Kärner (1880–1942), Estonian politician
- Hillar Kärner (1935–2017), Estonian chess player
- Irmgard Kärner (1927–2014), German chess player
- Jaak Kärner (1892–1937), Estonian sport shooter
- Jaan Kärner (1891–1958), Estonian poet and writer
- Jüri Kärner (1940–2010), Estonian biologist
- Kris Kärner (born 1996), Estonian politician, YouTuber and livestreamer
- Olle Kärner (born 1977), Estonian orienteer
