= Free rifle =

Free rifle is the former name of four ISSF shooting events:

- 300 metre rifle three positions
- 300 metre rifle prone
- 50 metre rifle three positions (for men; the female version was called standard rifle and then sport rifle)
- 50 metre rifle prone (for men; the female version was called standard rifle and then sport rifle)
