= Sainte-Marie-du-Bois =

Sainte-Marie-du-Bois may refer to the following communes in France:

- Sainte-Marie-du-Bois, Manche, in the Manche département
- Sainte-Marie-du-Bois, Mayenne, in the Mayenne département

== See also ==
- Sainte-Marie-au-Bosc, in the Seine-Maritime département
