= European 300 m Rifle Championships =

Sport shooting competition

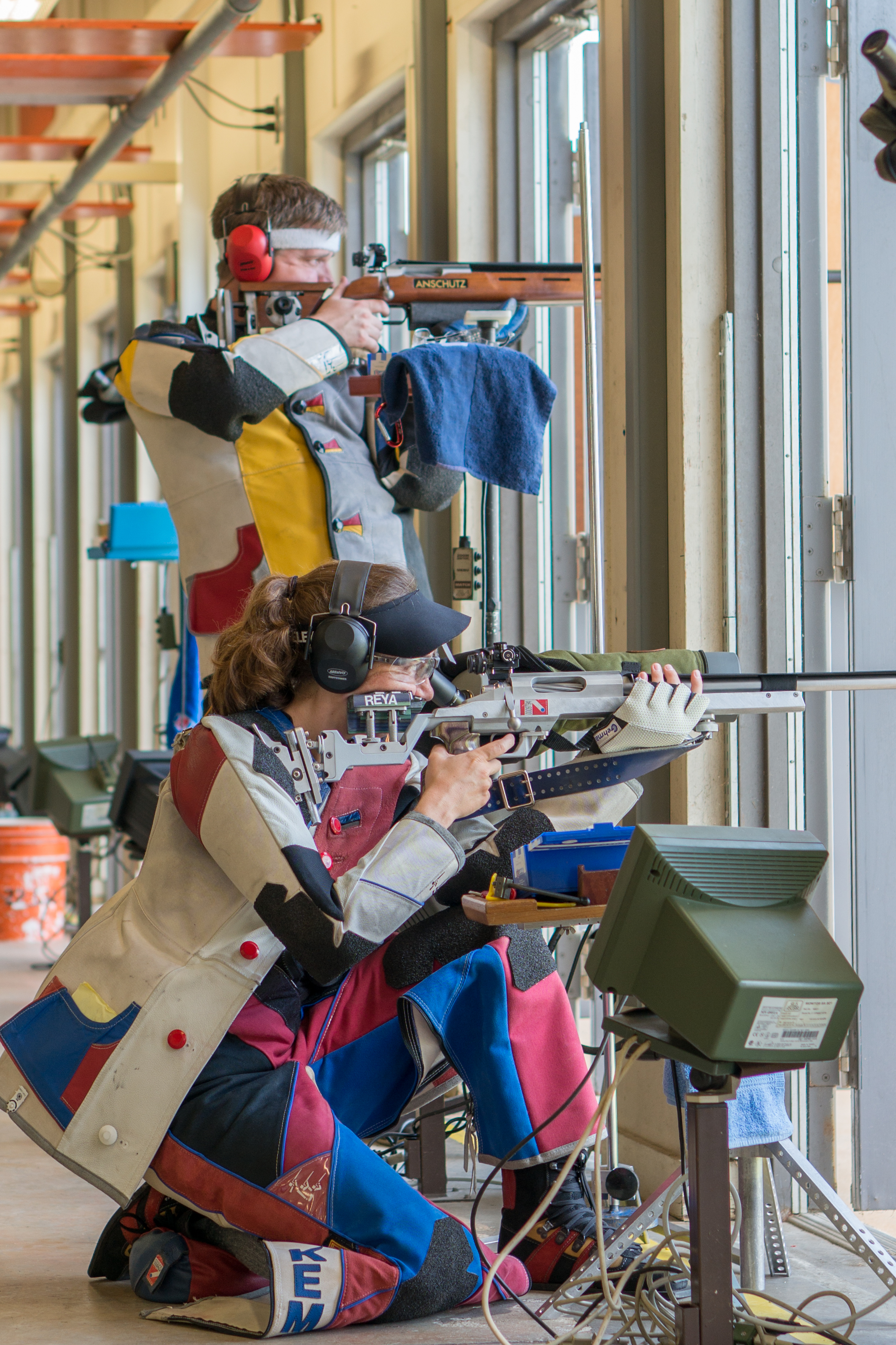
Two shooters in two positions (standing and kneeliig) of the three, while competing in 300 m rifle three positions.

The European 300 m Rifle Championships are special shooting sport championships of 300 metre rifle discipline, organized discontinuously as a stand alone championships by the International Shooting Sport Federation (ISSF) since 1959.

== Disciplines ==
- 300 m rifle three positions
- 300 m rifle standard
- 300 m rifle kneeling
- 300 m rifle standing
- 300 m rifle prone

== Editions ==
#	Year	Venue	Disciplines	Individual events	Team events	Date
1	1959	(Switzerland) Winterthur	300 m rifle	5 (men)	1 (men)	25 - 26 August
2	1977	(Switzerland) Winterthur	300 m rifle	5 (men)	5 (men)	9 - 11 September
3	1981	(Finland) Oulu	300 m rifle	5 (men)	5 (men)	15 - 20 June
4	1983	(Norway) Oslo	300 m rifle	5 (men)	5 (men)	15 - 19 June
5	1985	(Switzerland) Zürich	300 m rifle	5 (men)	5 (men)	6 - 10 September
6	1989	(Finland) Lahti	300 m rifle	5 (men)	5 (men)	29 July - 2 August
7	1991	(Switzerland) Winterthur	300 m rifle	5 (men)	5 (men)	
8	1993	(Switzerland) Thun	300 m rifle	3 (men)	3 (men)	
9	1995	(Sweden) Boden	300 m rifle	3 (men)	3 (men)	
10	1997	(Denmark) Copenhagen	300 m rifle	3 (men)	3 (men)	
11	1999	(France) Saint-Jean-de-Marsacq	300 m rifle	3 (men)	3 (men)	
12	2022	(Croatia) Zagreb	300 m rifle	5 (2 men +2 women +1 open)	4 (1 men +1 women+2 mixed)	26 – 30 July
13	2026	(Croatia) Osijek	300 m rifle	5 (2 men +2 women +1 open)	4 (1 men +1 women+2 mixed)	2 – 5 May

== See also ==
- ISSF shooting events
- International Shooting Sport Federation
- ISSF European Shooting Championships
