= Ryan Tanoue =

American sport shooter (born 1983)

Personal information
- Nationality: United States
- Born: January 6, 1983 (age 43) Honolulu, Hawaii
- Height: 1.68 m (5 ft 6 in)
- Weight: 66 kg (146 lb)

Sport
- Country: United States
- Sport: Shooting
- Event: 10 m air rifle (AR60)
- College team: Nevada Reno
- Coached by: David Johnson
- Now coaching: Ohio State Buckeyes
Medal record
Men's shooting
Representing the United States
World Cup
Gold medal – first place	2005 WC Munich	AR60
Bronze medal – third place	2005 WCF Munich	AR60
World Championships
Bronze medal – third place	2002 WCH Lahti	AR60 Junior

Ryan Tanoue is an American sport shooter. He is an ISSF World Cup gold medalist and the 2002 NCAA Champion in air rifle. After serving six years as a Nevada Wolf Pack rifle team volunteer assistant, Tanoue now acts as the Director of Shooting Sports for Ohio State Athletics and is the head coach of the Ohio State Buckeyes rifle team.

== Shooting career ==
Tanoue began his shooting career as a freshman at St. Louis School in Honolulu, HI. In 2000, his senior year at St. Louis, Tanoue captured the Boys’ State Championship. He then attended the University of Nevada Reno, where he was a member of the Nevada Wolf Pack rifle team. As a member of the team, Tanoue earned seven NRA All-American honors: four air rifle and three smallbore. Tanoue defeated the University of Alaska Fairbanks’ Matthew Emmons via a tiebreaker to earn the 2002 NCAA Individual Air Rifle title as a freshman with a score of 392-29x. He was also a team captain for the Wolf Pack for three years.

On the national stage, Tanoue holds two USA Shooting National Championship titles in the Men's Air Rifle event. His first title came in 2004, with a score of 1286.1. Three years later in 2007, he won his second title with a score of 1284.0.

From 2003 to 2008, Tanoue was a member of the United States National Shooting Team. As a member of the team, he has earned three medals in ISSF competition, two bronze and one gold. His first international medal came in 2002 at the ISSF World Championships in Lahti, Finland, where he took bronze in the Junior Men's Air Rifle competition with a score of 592. In 2005, Tanoue earned his next two medals. The first came at the ISSF World Cup in Munich, Germany in the Men's Air Rifle event. Tanoue scored 597 points in the qualifying round and 102.5 points in the final round for a total of 699.5. This championship finish came with an Olympic quota place, earning the United States a place in the Men’s Air Rifle competition in the 2008 Beijing Olympics. His final international medal, bronze in the Men’s Air Rifle event, was earned at the 2005 ISSF World Cup Final, also in Munich, with a score of 594 in the qualifying round and 103.4 in the final round for a total of 697.4.

In 2015, Tanoue was elected to the Nevada Athletics Hall of Fame.

== Coaching career ==
Following his international career, Tanoue returned to his alma mater, where he served as a volunteer assistant coach of the University of Nevada Reno Wolf Pack Rifle Team for six years. In 2012, Tanoue was hired as head coach for the Ohio State Buckeyes Rifle Team. He led the 2013 Buckeyes to a Western Intercollegiate Rifle Conference championship before joining the Patriot Rifle Conference in 2014. Under his coaching, the Buckeyes sent individuals to the NCAA Rifle Championships in 2013, 2014, 2015, 2020, 2021, 2022, and 2024. Tanoue's leadership saw a full team qualify to the championships in 2016, 2017, and 2018. Following the first Buckeye team appearance in the NCAA Rifle Championships, Tanoue was elected the 2016 NRA National Coach of the Year. In 2017, he was named Director of Shooting Sports at Ohio State.
