= Serdar Demirel =

Turkish sport shooter (born 1983)

Personal information
- Nationality: Turkish
- Born: 4 September 1983 (age 42) Sivas, Turkey
- Occupation: Police chief
- Years active: 2001-present

Sport
- Country: Turkey
- Sport: Air pistol
- Event: 10 m air pistol
Medal record
Men's Shooting
Representing Turkey
ISSF World Championships
Bronze medal – third place	2002 Lahti	10 m airf pistol Junior
European Championships
Bronze medal – third place	2021 Osijek	10 m air pistol Team

Serdar Demirel (born 4 September 1983, in Sivas) is a Turkish sport shooter specialized in 10 meter air pistol events. He is the police chief of the public security branch office at Nevşehir provincial directorate of security.

== Achievements ==
- Bronze 2002 ISSF World Shooting Championships in Lahti, Finland (unior men's),
- Bronze 2021 European Shooting Championships, Osijek, Croatia (Team),

== Records ==
- 50 metre pistol
  - Qualification: 553
  - With final: 653.4
- 10 metre air pistol
  - Qualification: 575
  - With final: 675.5
