= Sauveterre-de-Guyenne =

- Commune
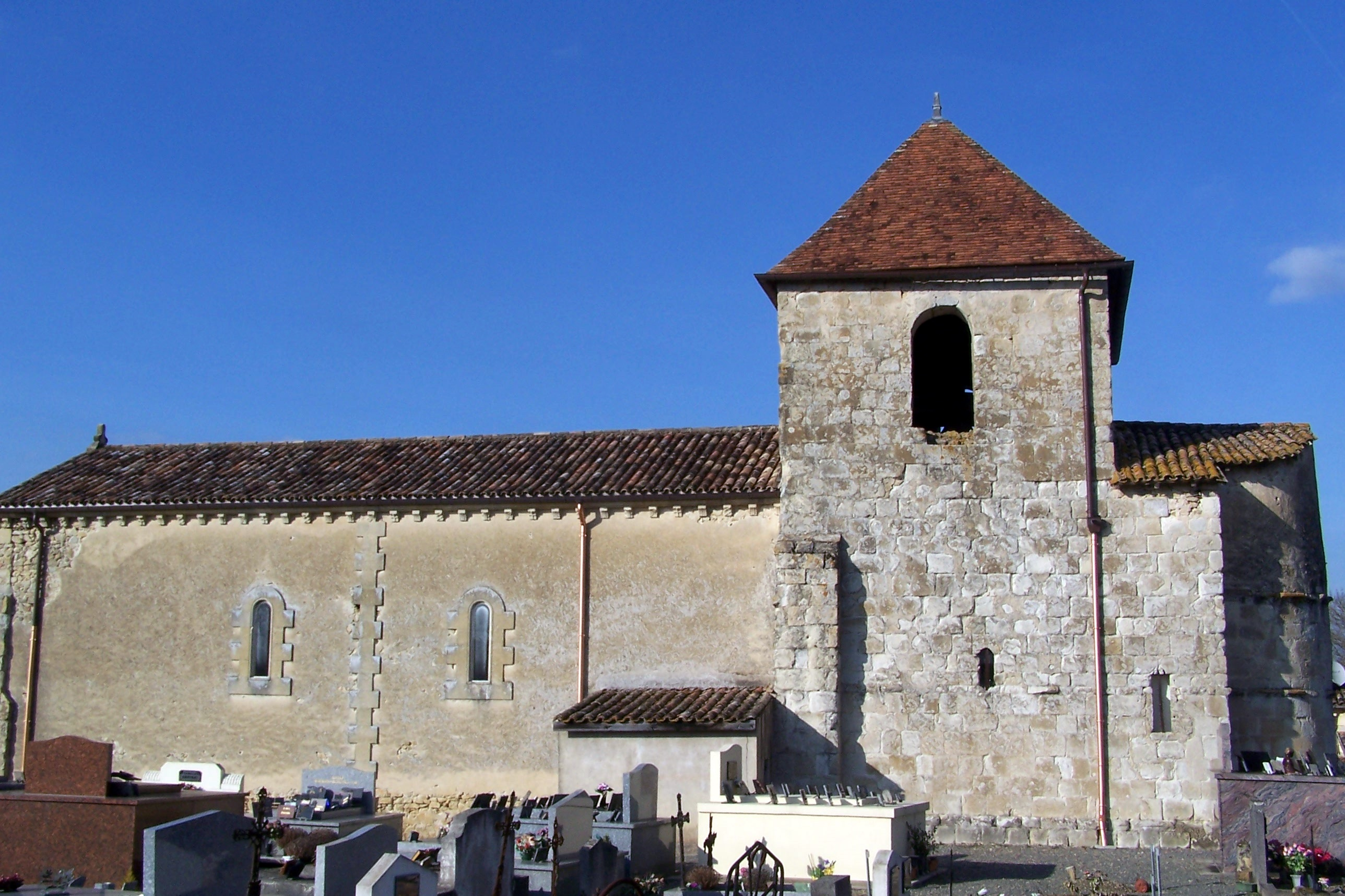
- The church of Saint-Romain-de-Vignague in Sauveterre-de-Guyenne

- Coat of arms
- Location of Sauveterre-de-Guyenne
- Location within France Location within Nouvelle-Aquitaine
- Coordinates: 44°41′37″N 0°05′06″W
- Country: France
- Region: Nouvelle-Aquitaine
- Department: Gironde
- Arrondissement: Langon
- Canton: Le Réolais et Les Bastides
- Intercommunality: CC rurales de l'Entre-Deux-Mers

Government
  - Mayor (2020–2026): Christophe Miqueu
- Area^{1}: 31.75 km^{2} (12.26 sq mi)
- Elevation: 82 m (269 ft)
- Highest elevation: 107 m (351 ft)
- Lowest elevation: 38 m (125 ft)
- Population (2023): 1,885
  - Density: 59.37/km^{2} (153.8/sq mi)
- Time zone: UTC+01:00 (CET)
  - Summer (DST): UTC+02:00 (CEST)
- INSEE/Postal code: 33506 /33540
- ^{1} French Land Register data, which excludes lakes, ponds, glaciers > 1 km^{2} (0.386 sq mi or 247 acres) and river estuaries.

Sauveterre-de-Guyenne (French pronunciation: [sɔvətɛʁ də ɡɥijɛn], literally Sauveterre of Guyenne; Gascon: Sauvatèrra de Guiana) is a commune in the Gironde department in Nouvelle-Aquitaine in southwestern France.

== Toponymy ==
Before 1896, Sauveterre-de-Guyenne was better known as Sauveterre-de Bazadais. This Bastide was built in a small village called "Athala" and was first named Salva-Terra (Salvation of the land), which later became Saubeterre and then Sauveterre.

== History ==
Sauveterre-de-Guyenne was founded as an English Bastide in 1281 by King Edward I of England, in the name of ending rivalries among the lords. He signed the "Charte des Coutumes de la Cité" in 1283, which protected the inhabitants and set the rules of life in the village community.

== Structure ==
Sauveterre-de-Guyenne is a very well maintained Bastide, having the typical Bastide 'grid' layout. The entry points into the city were through four stone tower gates. The central market square is surrounded by stone houses and the typical arcades on the ground floor, full of shops. The Church of Notre Dame is located at the top of the square.

== Population ==
Historical population

Year	Pop.	±% p.a.
1793	600	—
1821	589	−0.07%
1846	830	+1.38%
1872	838	+0.04%
1901	744	−0.41%
1926	730	−0.08%
1946	695	−0.25%
1954	701	+0.11%
1962	659	−0.77%

Year	Pop.	±% p.a.
1968	1,681	+16.89%
1975	1,557	−1.09%
1982	1,644	+0.78%
1990	1,715	+0.53%
1999	1,792	+0.49%
2007	1,778	−0.10%
2012	1,805	+0.30%
2017	1,788	−0.19%
2023	1,885	+0.88%

Source: EHESS and INSEE

The strong population increase between 1962 and 1968 is caused by the merger of Sauveterre-de-Guyenne with the former communes Le Puch, Saint-Léger-de-Vignague and Saint-Romain-de-Vignague in May 1965.

== Twin towns – sister cities ==
Town	State/Region	Country
Olite	Navarre	Spain

== See also ==
- Communes of the Gironde department
