= Bengt Andersson (sport shooter) =

Swedish rifle shooter (born 1966)

Bengt Andersson (born 6 March 1966 in Mora, Sweden) is a Swedish rifle shooter. He was a 300 m rifle specialist during most of the 1980-90s and won an individual gold medal in 300 metre rifle prone and was a part of the winning team at the 1998 ISSF World Shooting Championships in Zaragoza, Spain.

World Championship results
Event	1998
300 metre rifle prone Individual	(gold); 598
