= Heussé =

- Part of Le Teilleul
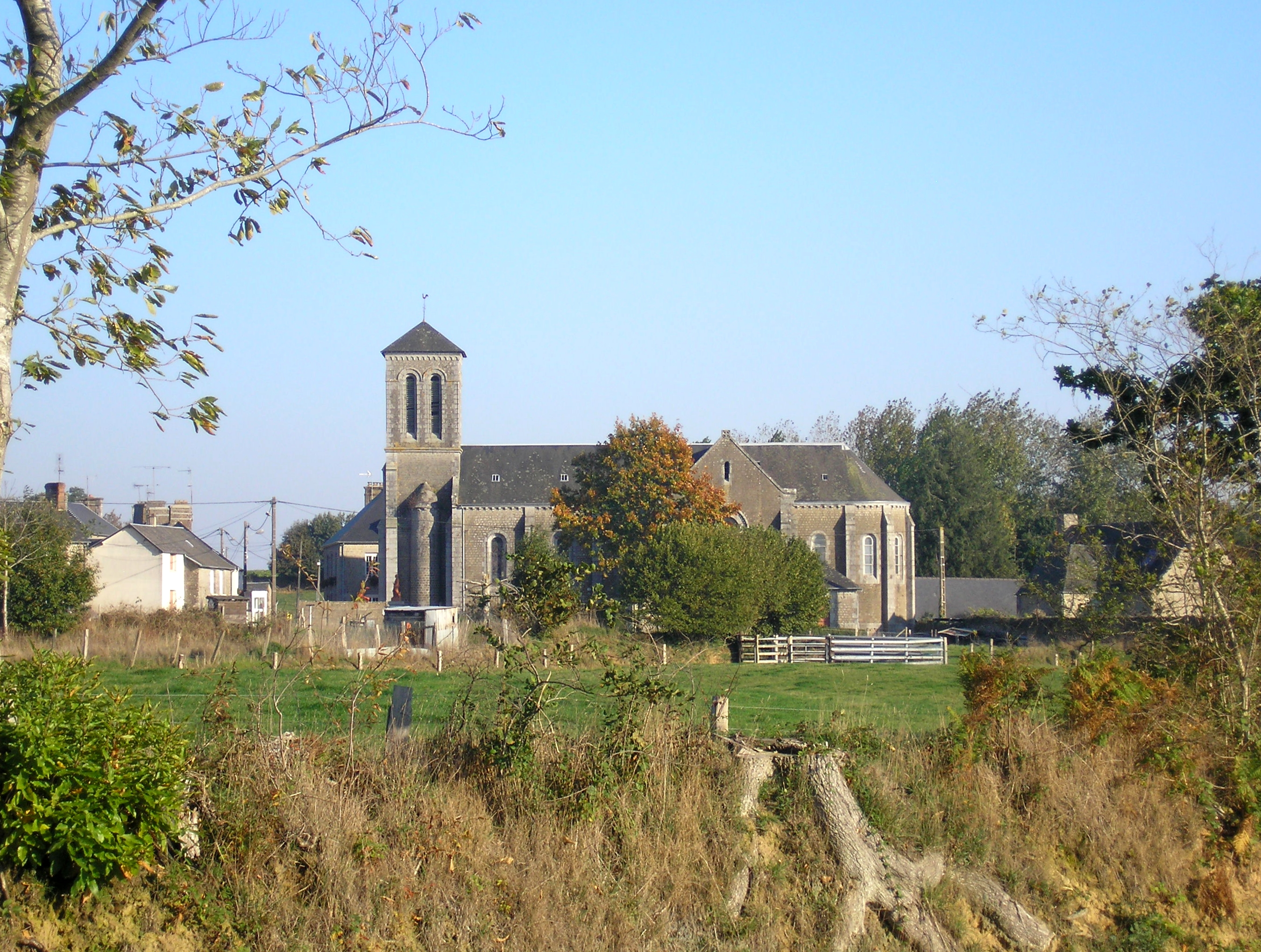
- The church of Saint-Pierre
- Location of Heussé
- Location within France Location within Normandy
- Coordinates: 48°30′28″N 0°53′56″W
- Country: France
- Region: Normandy
- Department: Manche
- Arrondissement: Avranches
- Canton: Le Mortainais
- Commune: Le Teilleul
- Area^{1}: 14.57 km^{2} (5.63 sq mi)
- Elevation: 206 m (676 ft)
- Highest elevation: 228 m (748 ft)
- Lowest elevation: 155 m (509 ft)
- Population (2022): 191
  - Density: 13.1/km^{2} (34.0/sq mi)
- Demonym: Heusséens
- Time zone: UTC+01:00 (CET)
  - Summer (DST): UTC+02:00 (CEST)
- Postal code: 50640
- ^{1} French Land Register data, which excludes lakes, ponds, glaciers > 1 km^{2} (0.386 sq mi or 247 acres) and river estuaries.

Heussé (French pronunciation: [øse]) is a former commune in the Manche department in north-western France. On 1 January 2016, it was merged into the commune of Le Teilleul.

== See also ==
- Communes of the Manche department
