= Ferrières, Manche =

Ferrières
- Part of Le Teilleul
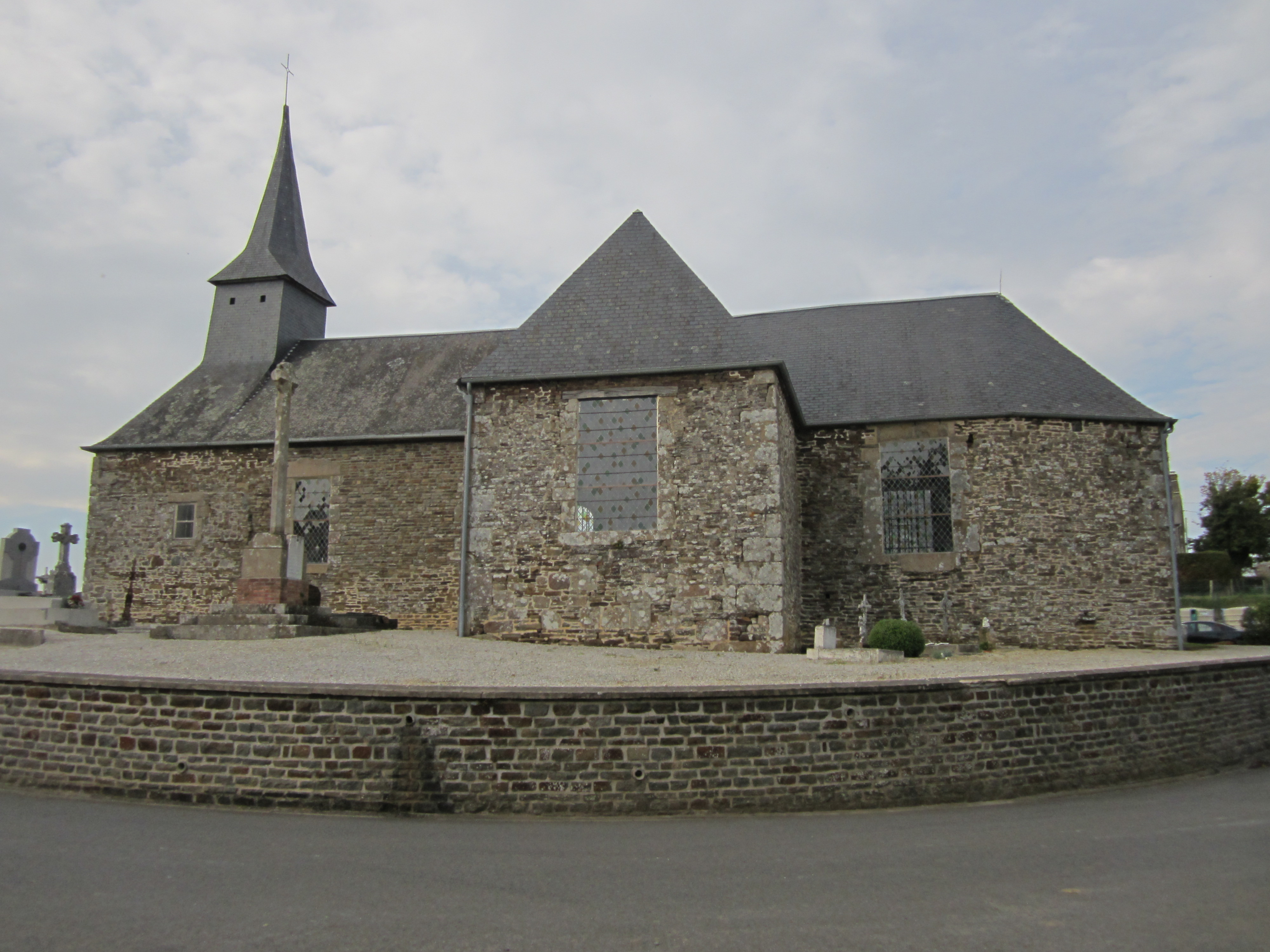
- The church of Saint-Siméon-le-Stylite
- Location of Ferrières
- Location within France Location within Normandy
- Coordinates: 48°32′41″N 0°57′23″W
- Country: France
- Region: Normandy
- Department: Manche
- Arrondissement: Avranches
- Canton: Le Mortainais
- Commune: Le Teilleul
- Area^{1}: 3.51 km^{2} (1.36 sq mi)
- Elevation: 129 m (423 ft)
- Highest elevation: 234 m (768 ft)
- Lowest elevation: 109 m (358 ft)
- Population (2022): 48
  - Density: 14/km^{2} (35/sq mi)
- Time zone: UTC+01:00 (CET)
  - Summer (DST): UTC+02:00 (CEST)
- Postal code: 50640
- ^{1} French Land Register data, which excludes lakes, ponds, glaciers > 1 km^{2} (0.386 sq mi or 247 acres) and river estuaries.

Ferrières (French pronunciation: [fɛʁjɛʁ]) is a former commune in the Manche department in north-western France. On 1 January 2016, it was merged into the commune of Le Teilleul.

== See also ==
- Communes of the Manche department
