= 2002 NCAA Rifle Championships =

23rd annual NCAA-sanctioned competition

2002 NCAA Rifle Championship
Tournament information
- Sport: Collegiate rifle shooting
- Location: (Kentucky) Murray, KY
- Host(s): Murray State University
- Participants: 10 teams

Final positions
- Champions: Alaska (5th title)
- 1st runners-up: Kentucky
- 2nd runners-up: Xavier

Tournament statistics
- Smallbore: Matthew Emmons, UAF
- Air rifle: Ryan Tanoue, NEV

The 2002 NCAA Rifle Championships were contested at the 23rd annual NCAA-sanctioned competition to determine the team and individual national champions of co-ed collegiate rifle shooting in the United States. The championship was hosted by Murray State University in Murray, Kentucky.

Three-time defending champions Alaska once again topped the team standings, finishing 31 points (6,241–6,209) points ahead of Kentucky. This was the Nanooks' fourth consecutive and fifth overall team title.

Matthew Emmons (Alaska) repeated as the individual national champion for the smallbore rifle whereas Ryan Tanoue (Nevada) claimed the title for the air rifle.

== Qualification ==
With only one national collegiate championship for rifle shooting, all NCAA rifle programs (whether from Division I, Division II, or Division III) were eligible. A total of ten teams contested this championship, a return to the size of the original two championships in 1980 and 1981.

== Results ==
- Scoring: The championship consisted of 120 shots by each competitor in smallbore and 40 shots per competitor in air rifle.

=== Team title ===
- (H) = Hosts
- (DC) = Defending champions
- Italics = Inaugural championship

Rank	Team	Points
1st place, gold medalist(s)	Alaska (DC)	6,241
2nd place, silver medalist(s)	Kentucky	6,209
3rd place, bronze medalist(s)	Xavier	6,204
4	Murray State (H)	6,193
5	Tennessee Tech	6,164
6	Navy	6,147
7	West Virginia	4,612
8	Coast Guard	4,558
9	Army	1,541
10	Nevada	1,531

=== Individual events ===
Event	Winner	Score
Smallbore	Matthew Emmons, Alaska	1,190
Air rifle	Ryan Tanoue, Nevada	392
