= Catherine Houlmont =

French sport shooter

Personal information
- Born: 5 December 1979 (age 46) Epernay, France
- Home town: Vertus, France
- Years active: 1987-
- Height: 170 cm (5 ft 7 in)
- Weight: 75 kg (165 lb)

Sport
- Country: France
- Sport: Shooting
- Event: 300 metre rifle prone
- Club: SC Mesnil
- Coached by: Jean Charles Carel; Chassat Roger
Medal record
Women's shooting
Representing France
World Championships
Bronze medal – third place	2010 Munich	300m Rifle Prone
Bronze medal – third place	2014 Granada	300m Rifle Prone Team

Catherine Houlmont (born 5 December 1979) is a French sports shooter. She won a bronze medal at the 2010 ISSF World Shooting Championships in the 300metre rifle prone event, and gold in the corresponding team event. At the 2014 ISSF World Shooting Championships she won bronze in the 300m rifle prone team.
