= Harry Creevy =

British sports shooter

Personal information
- Born: 22 May 1955 (age 71) Dumbarton, Scotland

Sport
- Country: Isle of Man; United Kingdom
- Sport: Shooting sport
- Events: 50 metre rifle prone; 300 meter rifle prone
- Club: Isle of Man Shooting Club; Laxey Rifle Club; Appleton Rifle Club
Medal record
Men's shooting
Representing Great Britain
Event / 1st / 2nd / 3rd; World Shooting Championships / 1 / - / -
World Shooting Championships
Gold medal – first place	2010 Munich	Men Team 300 m Rifle Prone

Harry Creevy (born 22 May 1955) is a British sports shooter. Creevy represented Great Britain at three ISSF World Shooting Championships and 11 World Cups, as well as representing the Isle of Man at eight Commonwealth Games, multiple Commonwealth Shooting Championships and Island Games.

== Career ==
Creevy received his first cap for the Isle of Man in 1979 and seven years later was selected to represent Mann at the 1986 Commonwealth Games in Edinburgh. At the 1994 Victoria Games Creevy equalled the British Record of 399/400 Prone, finishing 6th in the final. This success saw his first selection for Great Britain in 1995.

At the 2010 World Championships, Creevy took team Gold in the 300 metre rifle prone event with Simon Aldhouse and Tony Lincoln.

In March 2011 Creevy won his first European Cup medal in Aarhus, claiming an individual Bronze medal in the Men's 300 metre rifle prone after shooting 599ex600. He went on to take team Bronze at another European Cup event in May with Simon Aldhouse and Martin Scrivens.

The 2014 Commonwealth Games in Glasgow were his last. He had initially planned to retire after the 2010 Commonwealth Games in Delhi however having qualified for the Glasgow Games, was encouraged to finish his Commonwealth Games career in Scotland, having attended his first Games in Edinburgh.
