= Le Teilleul =

- Commune
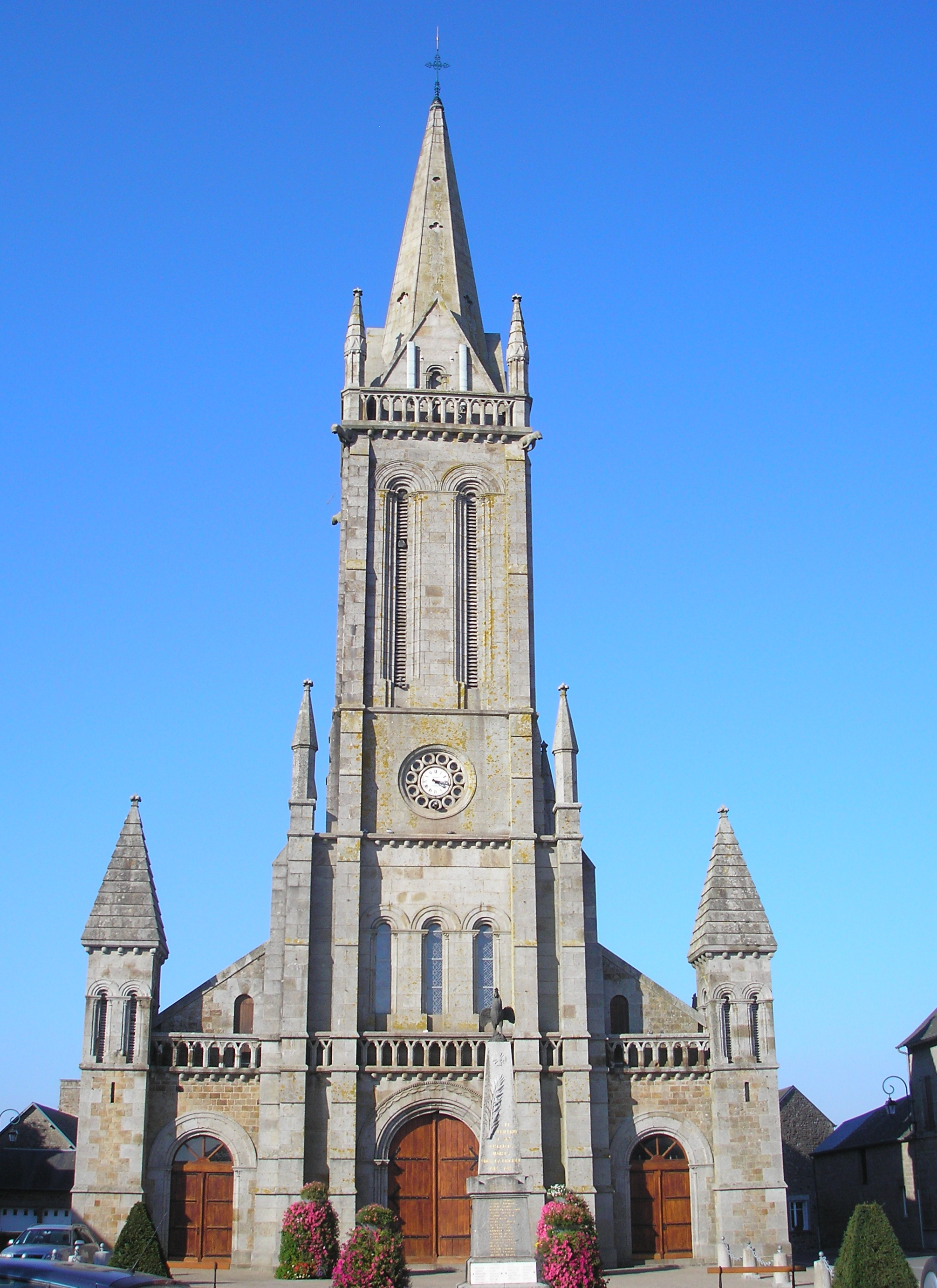
- The church in Le Teilleul

- Coat of arms
- Location of Le Teilleul
- Location within France Location within Normandy
- Coordinates: 48°32′21″N 0°52′25″W
- Country: France
- Region: Normandy
- Department: Manche
- Arrondissement: Avranches
- Canton: Le Mortainais
- Intercommunality: CA Mont-Saint-Michel-Normandie

Government
  - Mayor (2020–2026): Véronique Künkel
- Area^{1}: 66.89 km^{2} (25.83 sq mi)
- Elevation: 212 m (696 ft)
- Highest elevation: 222 m (728 ft)
- Lowest elevation: 103 m (338 ft)
- Population (2023): 1,706
  - Density: 25.50/km^{2} (66.06/sq mi)
- Demonym: Teilleulais et Teilleulaise
- Time zone: UTC+01:00 (CET)
  - Summer (DST): UTC+02:00 (CEST)
- INSEE/Postal code: 50591 /50640
- ^{1} French Land Register data, which excludes lakes, ponds, glaciers > 1 km^{2} (0.386 sq mi or 247 acres) and river estuaries.

Le Teilleul (French pronunciation: [lə.tɛj'œl]) is a commune in the Manche department in Normandy in north-western France. On 1 January 2016, the former communes of Ferrières, Heussé, Husson and Sainte-Marie-du-Bois were merged into Le Teilleul.

== Heraldry ==
Arms of Le Teilleul	The arms of Le Teilleul are blazoned : Azure, 3 horseshoes argent.

== See also ==
- Communes of the Manche department
