= Sainte-Marie-du-Bois, Manche =

Sainte-Marie-du-Bois
- Part of Le Teilleul
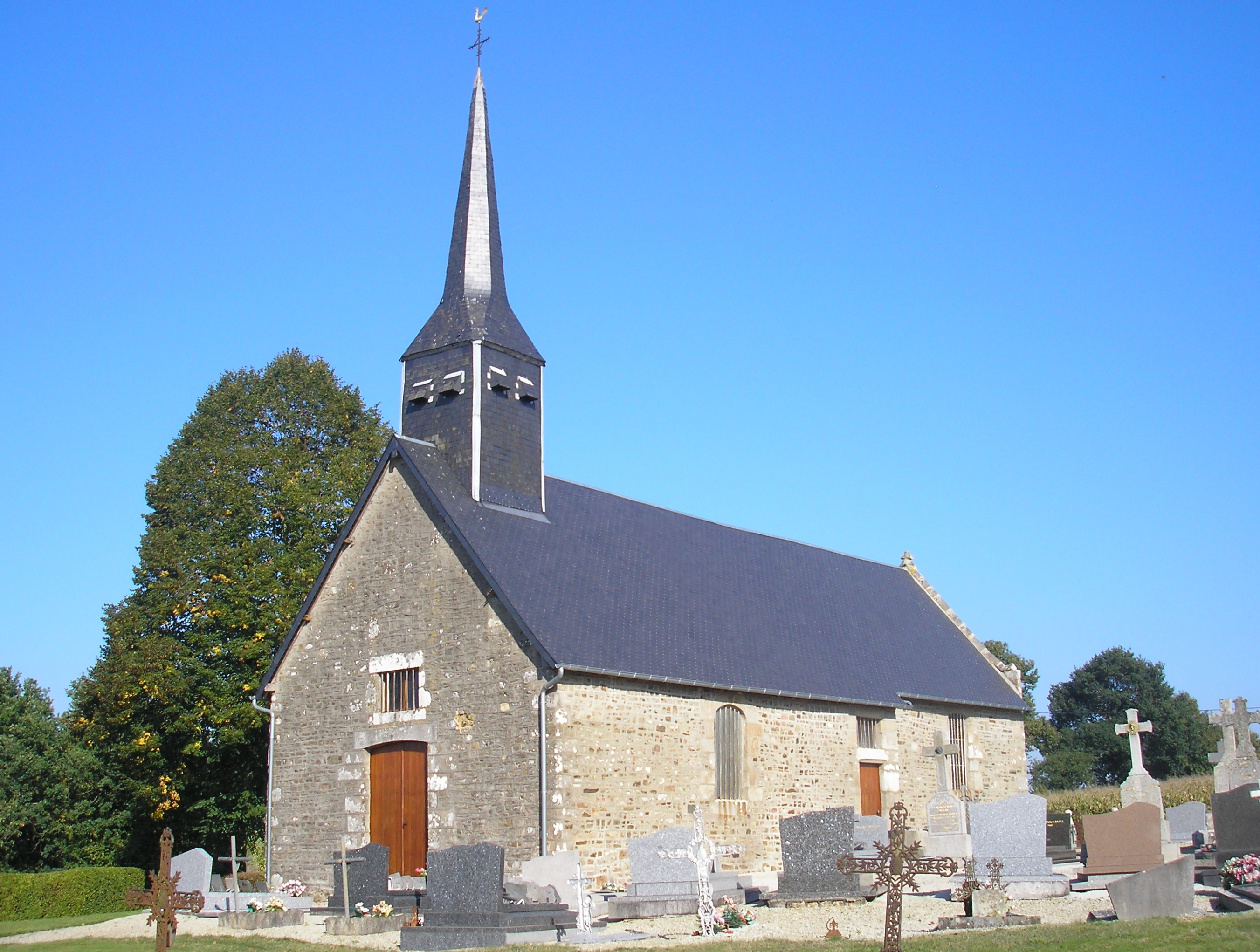
- The church of Notre-Dame
- Location of Sainte-Marie-du-Bois
- Location within France Location within Normandy
- Coordinates: 48°33′50″N 0°53′25″W
- Country: France
- Region: Normandy
- Department: Manche
- Arrondissement: Avranches
- Canton: Le Mortainais
- Commune: Le Teilleul
- Area^{1}: 4.77 km^{2} (1.84 sq mi)
- Elevation: 155 m (509 ft)
- Highest elevation: 210 m (690 ft)
- Lowest elevation: 100 m (330 ft)
- Population (2022): 57
  - Density: 12/km^{2} (31/sq mi)
- Time zone: UTC+01:00 (CET)
  - Summer (DST): UTC+02:00 (CEST)
- Postal code: 50640
- ^{1} French Land Register data, which excludes lakes, ponds, glaciers > 1 km^{2} (0.386 sq mi or 247 acres) and river estuaries.

Sainte-Marie-du-Bois (French pronunciation: [sɛ̃t maʁi dy bwa]) is a former commune in the Manche department in Normandy in north-western France. On 1 January 2016, it was merged into the commune of Le Teilleul. Its population was 57 in 2022.

== See also ==
- Communes of the Manche department
