= Albert Courquin (sport shooter) =

French sport shooter (1875–1953)

Personal information
- Born: 30 March 1875 Bourbourg-Campagne, France
- Died: 24 March 1953 (aged 77) Albi, France

Sport
- Sport: Sports shooting
Medal record
Men's shooting
Representing France
Olympic Games
Silver medal – second place	1924 Paris	Team free rifle
Bronze medal – third place	1908 London	Team free rifle

Albert Courquin (30 March 1875 – 24 March 1953) was a French sport shooter who competed at the 1908 Summer Olympics and 1924 Summer Olympics.

In the 1908 Olympics, he won a bronze medal in the team free rifle event and was fourth in the team military rifle event. Sixteen years later he won a silver medal in the team free rifle event and was sixth in the individual 600 m free rifle event.
