= Kaarel Kübar =

Estonian sport shooter

Kaarel Kübar (before 1937 Karl-Eduard; 15 January 1907 – 28 May 2004) was an Estonian sport shooter.

He was born in Vara Rural Municipality, Tartu County.

He began his shooting career in 1933. He won 5 medals at 1939 ISSF World Shooting Championships. He was 4-times Estonian champion in different shooting disciplines. 1937–1939 he was a member of Estonian national sport shooting team.

1944–1954 he spent in a prison camp in Siberia. In 1955 he returned to Estonia.

In 2000 he was awarded Order of the White Star V Class.

He is buried at Rahumäe Cemetery in Tallinn.
