= Dorothee Bauer =

German sport shooter (born 1983)

Dorothee Bauer (born 11 June 1983) is a German sport shooter who competed in the 2004 Summer Olympics.
