= Jakob Reich =

Sports shooter

Personal information
- Born: 10 May 1890 Degersheim, Switzerland
- Died: 30 October 1974 (aged 84) Zurich, Switzerland

Sport
- Sport: Sports shooting

Jakob Reich (10 May 1890 – 30 October 1974) was a Swiss sports shooter. He competed in three events at the 1924 Summer Olympics.
