= Caspar Widmer =

Swiss sports shooter

Personal information
- Born: 28 May 1874 Ettiswil, Switzerland
- Died: 27 March 1953 (aged 78) St. Gallen, Switzerland

Sport
- Sport: Sports shooting

Caspar Widmer (28 May 1874 – 27 March 1953) was a Swiss sports shooter. He competed at the 1906 Intercalated Games and the 1920 Summer Olympics.
