= Husson (commune) =

- Part of Le Teilleul
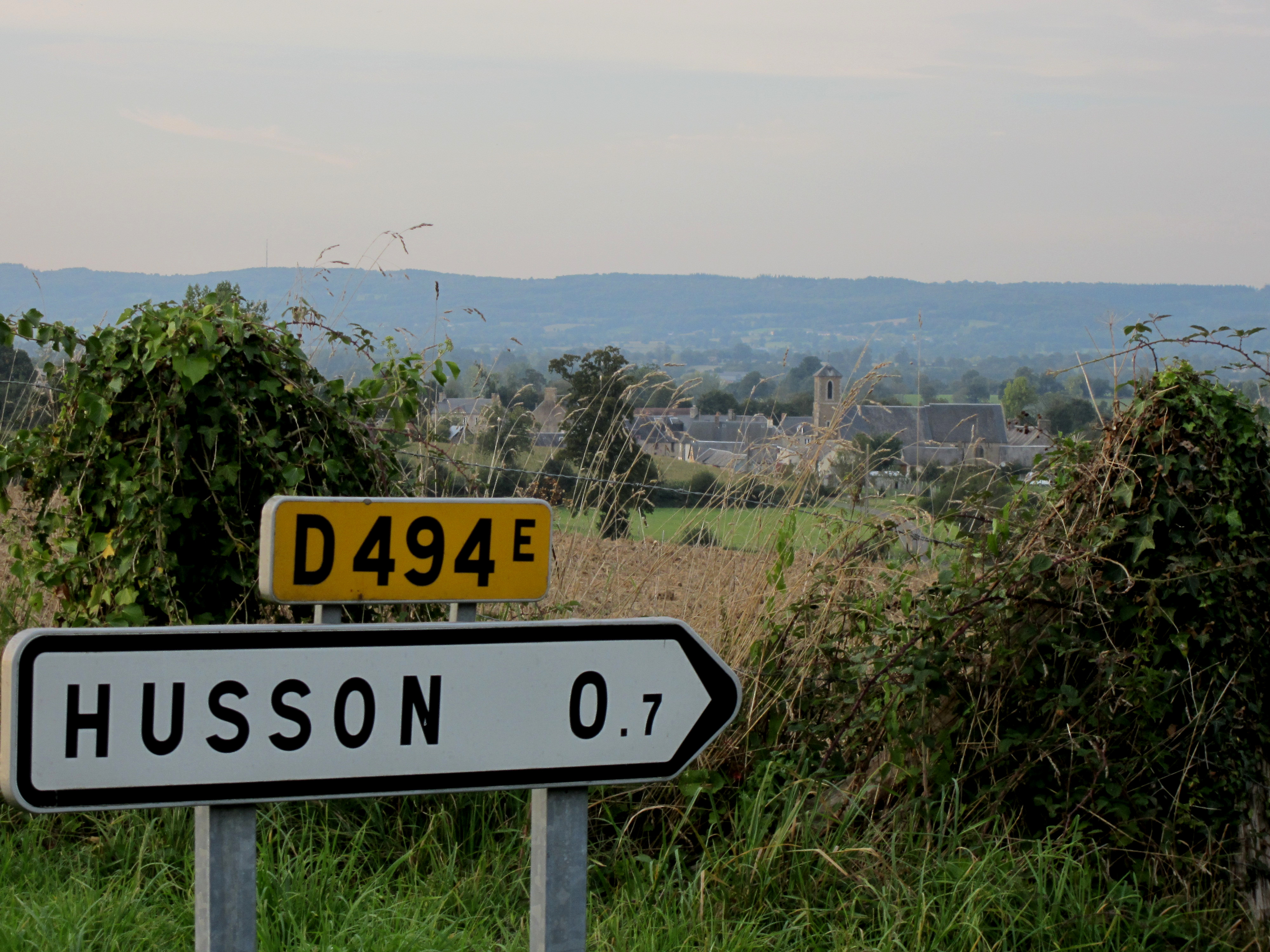
- View from Sainte-Marie-du-Bois
- Location of Husson
- Location within France Location within Normandy
- Coordinates: 48°34′15″N 0°53′28″W
- Country: France
- Region: Normandy
- Department: Manche
- Arrondissement: Avranches
- Canton: Le Mortainais
- Commune: Le Teilleul
- Area^{1}: 13.59 km^{2} (5.25 sq mi)
- Elevation: 105 m (344 ft)
- Highest elevation: 133 m (436 ft)
- Lowest elevation: 78 m (256 ft)
- Population (2022): 177
  - Density: 13.0/km^{2} (33.7/sq mi)
- Time zone: UTC+01:00 (CET)
  - Summer (DST): UTC+02:00 (CEST)
- Postal code: 50640
- ^{1} French Land Register data, which excludes lakes, ponds, glaciers > 1 km^{2} (0.386 sq mi or 247 acres) and river estuaries.

Husson (French pronunciation: [ysɔ̃]) is a former commune in the Manche department in north-western France. On 1 January 2016, it was merged into the commune of Le Teilleul.

== See also ==
- Communes of the Manche department
- Thérèse-Adèle Husson
