= Kris Kärner =

Estonian politician and internet personality (born 1996)

Member of Tartu City Council
- Incumbent
- Assumed office 26 November 2025

Personal details
- Born: 21 November 1996 (age 29) Tartu, Estonia
- Party: Independent (since 2025)
- Other political affiliations: Isamaa (2025)
- Occupation: Politician, livestreamer

YouTube information
- Channel: Istoprocent
- Years active: 2011–present
- Genre: Video games
- Subscribers: 36,300
- Views: 1.26 million
- Last updated: October 2026

Kris Kärner (born 21 November 1996), known online as Istoprocent, is an Estonian politician, YouTuber and livestreamer. He has been a member of the Tartu City Council since November 2025, having been elected on the list of Isamaa in the 2025 Estonian municipal elections. Kärner left Isamaa before the election and has sat with the Estonian Centre Party's council faction since September 2026, without becoming a member of that party.

== Education ==
In August 2026, Kärner enrolled at Tallinn University to study political science, following public criticism of his educational background by fellow Tartu politician Tõnis Lukas.

== Media career ==
Kärner established his YouTube channel under the name Istoprocent in 2011 and subsequently gained an audience through video-game livestreams, including on Twitch. In 2017, he received the Streamer of the Year award at Estonia's Playnupp social media awards.

By 2025, Kärner was also working in marketing. He told Eesti Rahvusringhääling (ERR) that his years as an online content creator had helped him build a voter base in Tartu. An ERR report on the 2025 municipal elections identified social media campaigning as a factor in the success of Kärner and fellow Isamaa candidate Sandra Laur.

== Political career ==
Kärner joined Isamaa on 4 February 2025 and was placed on its list for the October municipal elections in Tartu. He left the party on 13 September, after earlier social media remarks attracted criticism, but remained on the electoral list. Isamaa's Tartu mayoral candidate, Tõnis Lukas, urged Kärner to withdraw his candidacy, although the finalised candidate list could no longer be amended by the party.

At the election held on 19 October, Kärner won 1,597 votes, the fourth-highest personal vote total in Tartu, and secured a seat on the city council. He said he had expected a weaker performance and attributed much of his support to younger voters and their supporters. His term as a councillor began on 26 November 2025.

After the election, Isamaa's Tartu district board invited Kärner to join its city council faction. Kärner accepted the invitation in November without rejoining the party. His inclusion became a point of dispute within the local Isamaa organisation, and Lukas declined to serve alongside him in the council faction. When the faction was constituted in December, Lukas remained outside it.

On 16 February 2026, the Isamaa faction announced Kärner's expulsion following further controversial statements made during an online broadcast. Faction chair Kaspar Kokk said that the remarks were inconsistent with the conduct expected of an elected representative. Lukas subsequently rejoined the Isamaa faction.

In September 2026, Kärner agreed to sit with the Centre Party's councillors, allowing them to form a five-member faction led by Anneli Ott. Joining the faction did not amount to him joining the Centre Party itself. The new faction was registered on 10 September. Kärner serves on the city council's economic affairs committee.

== Controversies ==
In September 2025, Kärner faced criticism for social media posts containing a call to shoot members of the Social Democratic Party, as well as remarks about minority groups. Tartu deputy mayor Elo Kiivet reported the statements to the Police and Border Guard Board. Kärner apologised, explaining that he had used an online persona and that the violent statement had been intended as dark humour; he acknowledged that his language had been inappropriate for a political candidate.

In February 2026, another online recording drew criticism after Kärner made remarks about a hypothetical child having missed the Holocaust and mistreating minorities. The Estonian Jewish Community condemned the comments as offensive to the memory of Holocaust victims.

== Personal life ==
In August 2026, Kärner had married his partner, Agnes Mägi, in Tartu, after announcing their engagement in June.
