= Radim Novák (sport shooter) =

Czech sport shooter

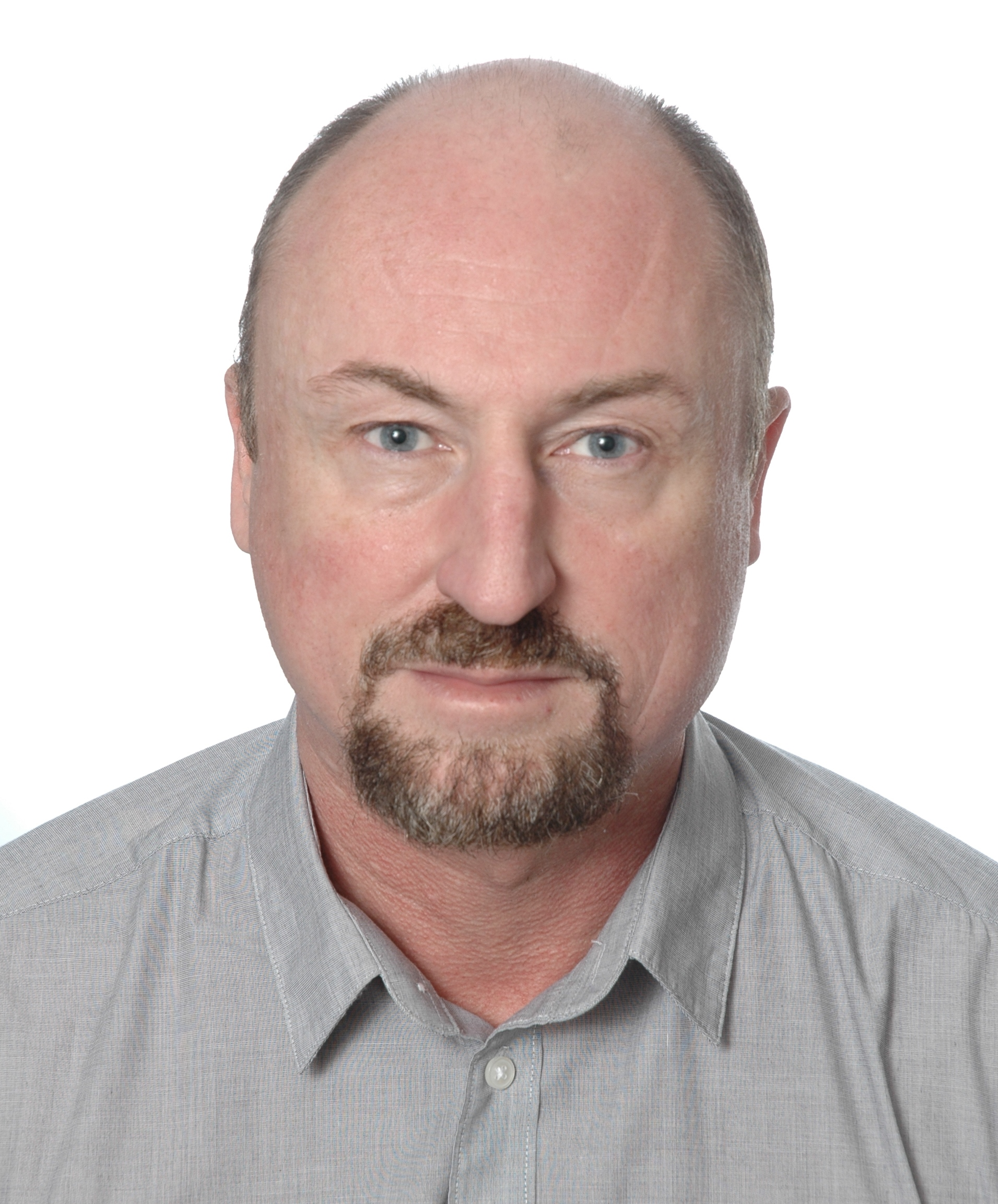
- Novák in 2020

Personal information
- Nationality: Czech
- Born: 26 March 1973 (age 52) Kolín, Czechoslovakia

Sport
- Sport: Sport shooting

Radim Novák (born 26 March 1973) is a Czech sport shooter. He competed in three events at the 2000 Summer Olympics.
