= Jaak Kärner =

Estonian sport shooter

Jaak Kärner (22 March 1892 – 22 July 1937) was an Estonian sport shooter from Tartu.

Kärner participated in World War I and the Estonian War of Independence.

He won three medals at the ISSF World Shooting Championships. From 1932 to 1936 he was a member of the Estonian national sport shooting team.

He is buried at Paistu Cemetery.
