= Roger Jansson (sport shooter) =

Swedish sports shooter

Personal information
- Nationality: Swedish
- Born: 13 May 1959; Uppsala, Sweden
- Died: 28 October 1994 (aged 35); Stockholm, Sweden

Sport
- Sport: Sports shooting

Roger Jansson (13 May 1959 – 28 October 1994) was a Swedish sports shooter. He competed in two events at the 1984 Summer Olympics.
