= Saint-Jean-de-Marsacq =

Saint Jean de Marsacq
- Commune
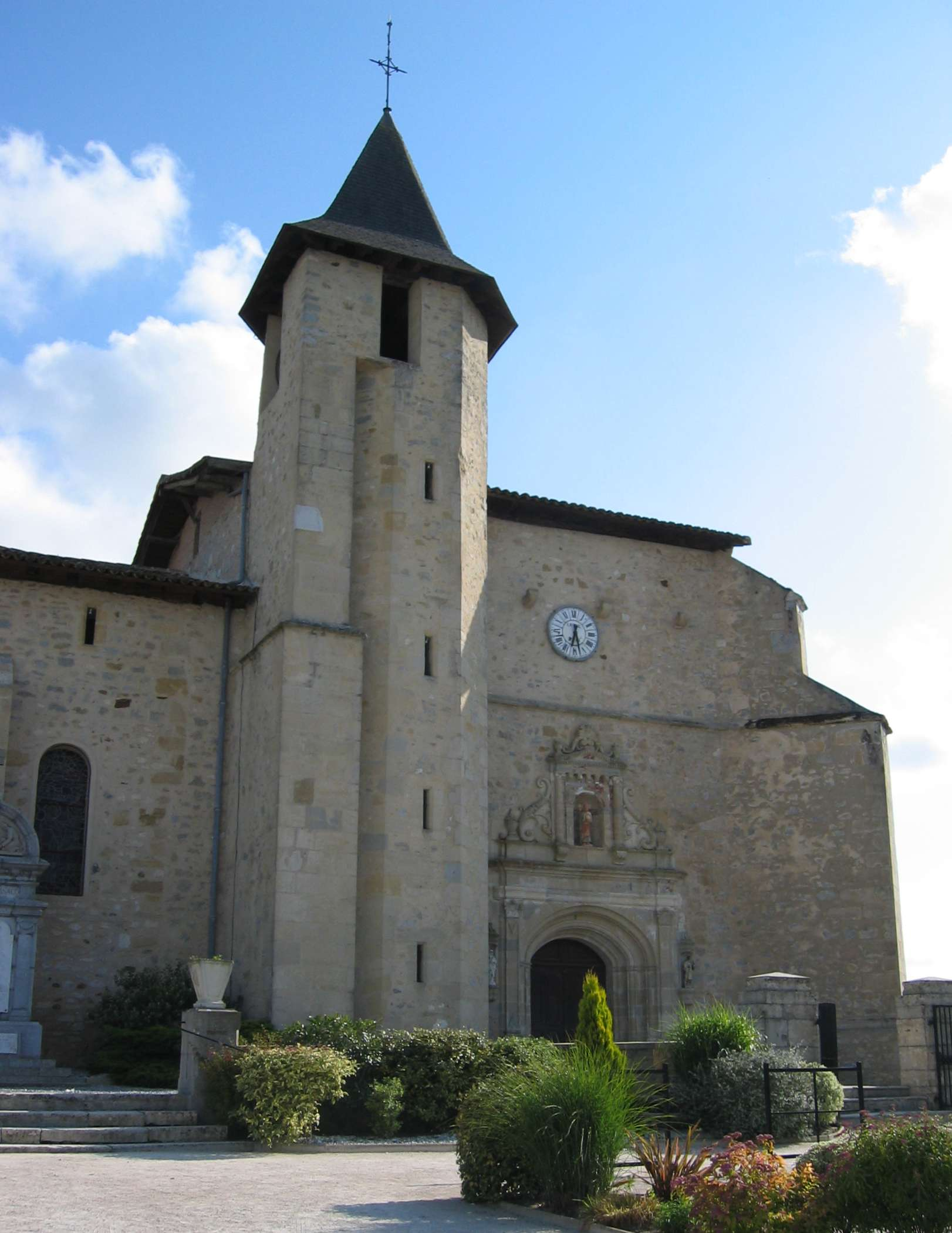
- Location of Saint Jean de Marsacq
- Location within France Location within Nouvelle-Aquitaine
- Coordinates: 43°37′38″N 1°15′28″W
- Country: France
- Region: Nouvelle-Aquitaine
- Department: Landes
- Arrondissement: Dax
- Canton: Pays Tyrossais
- Intercommunality: Maremne-Adour-Côte-Sud

Government
  - Mayor (2020–2026): Marie-Thérèse Libier
- Area^{1}: 26.4 km^{2} (10.2 sq mi)
- Elevation: 35 m (115 ft)
- Highest elevation: 91 m (299 ft)
- Lowest elevation: 2 m (6.6 ft)
- Population (2023): 1,840
  - Density: 69.7/km^{2} (181/sq mi)
- Time zone: UTC+01:00 (CET)
  - Summer (DST): UTC+02:00 (CEST)
- INSEE/Postal code: 40264 /40230
- ^{1} French Land Register data, which excludes lakes, ponds, glaciers > 1 km^{2} (0.386 sq mi or 247 acres) and river estuaries.

Saint-Jean-de-Marsacq (French pronunciation: [sɛ̃ ʒɑ̃ də maʁsak]; Gascon: Sent Joan de Marsac or, according to the etymology, Sent Joan de Marçac) is a commune in the Landes department in Nouvelle-Aquitaine in southwestern France.

== Population ==
Historical population
Year	Pop.	±% p.a.
1968	732	—
1975	688	−0.88%
1982	782	+1.85%
1990	793	+0.17%
1999	894	+1.34%
2007	1,243	+4.21%
2012	1,354	+1.73%
2017	1,614	+3.58%
2023	1,840	+2.21%
Source: INSEE

== See also ==
- Communes of the Landes department
