= Petr Kůrka =

Czech sport shooter (born 1960)

Personal information
- Nationality: Czech
- Born: 24 October 1960 (age 65) Teplice nad Bečvou, Czechoslovakia

Sport
- Sport: Sport shooting

Petr Kůrka (born 24 October 1960) is a Czech former sport shooter. He competed at the 1988 Summer Olympics, the 1992 Summer Olympics and the 1996 Summer Olympics.
