= Olivier Cottagnoud =

Swiss sport shooter (born 1961)

Personal information
- Nationality: Swiss
- Born: 20 March 1961 (age 65) Switzerland
- Height: 1.75 m (5 ft 9 in)
- Weight: 74 kg (163 lb)

Sport
- Sport: Shooting
- Event: 300 metre rifle
Medal record
Individual
Event	1st	2nd	3rd
European Championships	2	0	2
Team
Event	1st	2nd	3rd
World Championships	0	1	2
European Championships	8	2	3
Total	8	3	5

Olivier Cottagnoud (born 20 March 1961) is a former Swiss sport shooter who won medals at senior level at the European 300 m Rifle Championships (four individual and thirteen with the Swiss team).
