= Pascal Bessy =

French sports shooter

Personal information
- Nationality: French
- Born: 28 January 1956 (age 69); Arles, France

Sport
- Sport: Sports shooting

Pascal Bessy (born 28 January 1956) is a French sports shooter. He competed in two events at the 1988 Summer Olympics.
