= Norbert Sturny =

Swiss sports shooter

Personal information
- Nationality: Swiss
- Born: 10 October 1963 (age 61); Tafers, Switzerland

Sport
- Sport: Sports shooting

Norbert Sturny (born 8 October 1963) is a Swiss sports shooter. He competed at the 1988 Summer Olympics and the 1992 Summer Olympics.
