= Roger Chassat =

French sports shooter

Personal information
- Nationality: French
- Born: 7 January 1963 (age 62); Bitche, France

Sport
- Sport: Sports shooting

Roger Chassat (born 7 January 1963) is a French sports shooter. He competed in two events at the 1996 Summer Olympics.
