= Tapio Säynevirta =

Finnish sports shooter

Personal information
- Nationality: Finnish
- Born: 1 March 1965; Leppävirta, Finland
- Died: 5 September 2012 (aged 47); Kontiolahti, Finland

Sport
- Sport: Sports shooting

Tapio Säynevirta (1 March 1965 – 5 September 2012) was a Finnish sports shooter. He competed in the men's 10 metre air rifle event at the 1988 Summer Olympics.
