= ISSF 50 meter rifle three positions =

International Shooting Sport Federation event

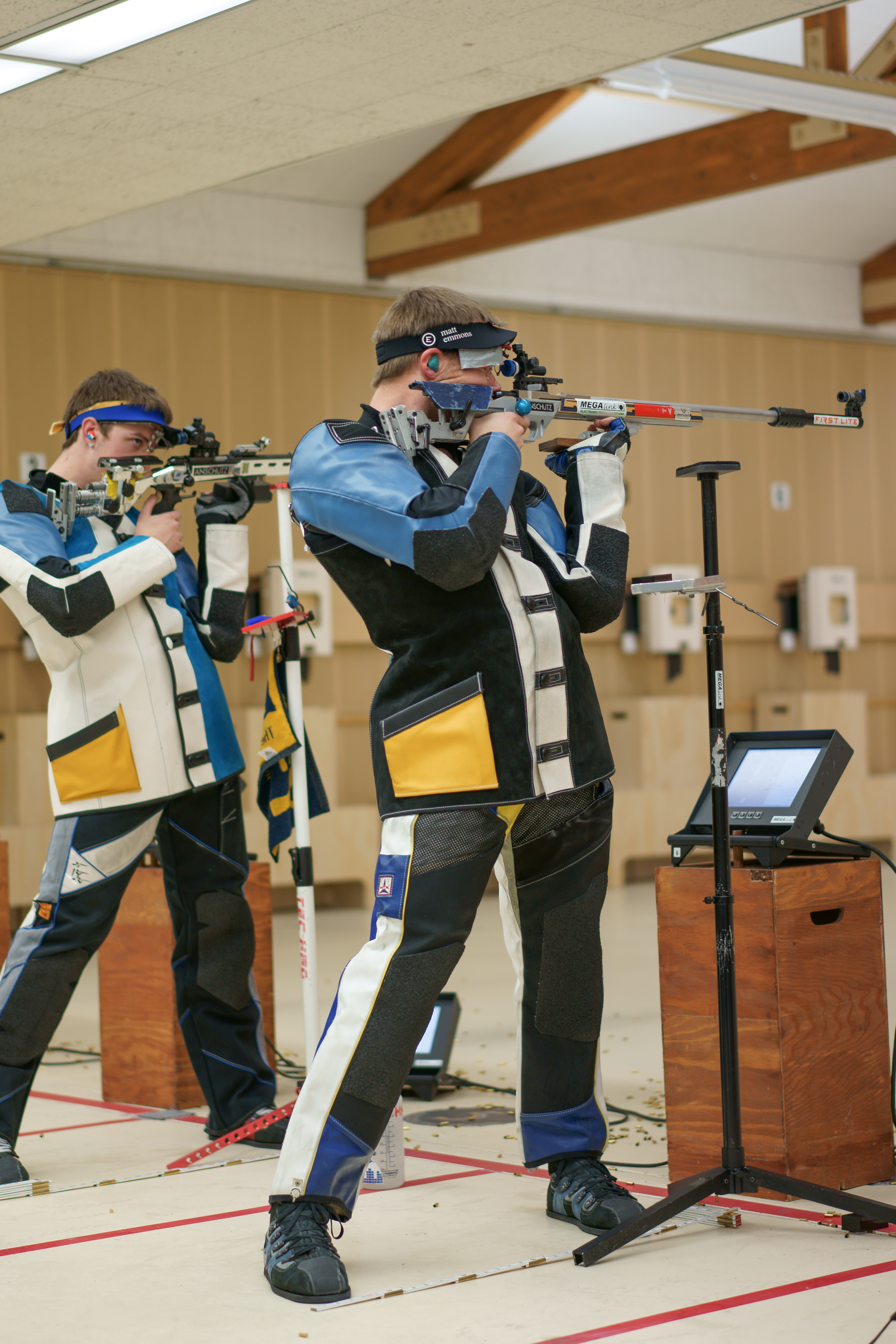

Men
- Number of shots: 3×20 + 45
- Olympic Games: Since 1952
- World Championships: Since 1939
- Abbreviation: FR3X20

Women
- Number of shots: 3×20 + 45
- Olympic Games: Since 1984
- World Championships: Since 1966
- Abbreviation: R3X20

The target: total Ø = 154.4 mm. 4 ring Ø = 106.4 mm. 9 ring Ø = 26.4 mm. 10 ring Ø = 10.4 mm, height 0.75 m above the floor

50 meter rifle three positions (formerly known as one of four free rifle disciplines) is an International Shooting Sport Federation event, a miniature version of 300 meter rifle three positions. It consists of twenty shots in each of the kneeling, prone, and standing positions, fired in that order. Historically men fired 3×40 shots and women shot 3×20. In January 2018, the number of shots was equalised between genders with the Women's 3x20 being abolished in favour of a 3x40 match identical to the men's event. The caliber is .22 Long Rifle (5.6 mm). In January 2022 the format was changed with men and women all firing the shorter 3x20 format.

In both the men's and women's event, athletes must complete the course of fire within a single time block of 1 hours, 30 minutes. Before January 2018, the Women's 3x20 event had a time limit of 1 hour, 45 minutes. These time limits are applicable to matches conducted using electronic targets; longer times are used if the slower manual scoring system is used. Until 2018, women's rifles were limited to 6.5 kilograms (14 lb), as opposed to 8.0 kilograms (17.6 lb) for men. This was the only remaining difference between men's and women's equipment after the switch from standard rifles to sport rifles. In January 2018 with the women's event extended to a 3x40 match, the 6.5 kilograms (14 lb) limit was abolished, with Women permitted to use rifles up to 8.0 kilograms (17.6 lb). This rendered the men's and women's events identical in both number of shots and equipment permitted.

In major competitions, including World Cups and World Championships, the top eight competitors reach a finals match, where the medal positions are decided. Beginning in 2013, a new finals format was instituted, in which the qualification score is discarded, and the standings among the top eight shooters are determined by their finals scores alone. The course of fire was also changed significantly with the new rules, from the previous 10-shot program in only the standing position, into a 45-shot elimination format in all three positions. After 10 of the 15 shots of the final, standing stage, the two lowest-ranked shooters are eliminated. For the remaining five shots, the lowest-ranked shooter is eliminated after each shot, before the final shot decides the gold and silver medalists among the final two survivors.

== World Championships, Men ==
Year	Place	Gold	Silver	Bronze
1937	(Finland) Helsinki	Jacques Louis Mazoyer (FRA)	Viljo Leskinen (FIN)	Gustav Lokotar (EST)
1939	(Switzerland) Luzern	Karl Steigelmann (GER)	August Liivik (EST)	Kurt Johansson (SWE)
1949	(Argentina) Buenos Aires	Pauli Aapeli Janhonen (FIN)	Arthur Edwin Cook (USA)	Erling Asbjoern Kongshaug (NOR)
1952	(Norway) Oslo	Erling Asbjoern Kongshaug (NOR)	Robert Bürchler (SUI)	Johan Hunæs (NOR)
1954	(Venezuela) Caracas	Anatoli Bogdanov (URS)	Vasily Borisov (URS)	Vilho Ilmari Ylönen (FIN)
1958	(Soviet Union) Moscow	Victor Shamburkin (URS)	Marat Niyazov (URS)	Moysey Itkis (URS)
1962	(Egypt) Cairo	Gary Anderson (USA)	Marat Niyazov (URS)	Erwin Vogt (SUI)
1966	(West Germany) Wiesbaden	Gary Anderson (USA)	Marat Niyazov (URS)	Henryk Górski (POL)
1970	(United States) Phoenix	Vitali Parkhimovitch (URS)	John Writer (USA)	Lones Wigger (USA)
1974	(Switzerland) Thun	John Writer (USA)	Lones Wigger (USA)	Lanny Bassham (USA)
1978	(South Korea) Seoul	Lanny Bassham (USA)	Malcolm Cooper (GBR)	Ulrich Lind (FRG)
1982	(Venezuela) Caracas	Vladimir Lvov (URS)	Peter Heinz (FRG)	Viktor Vlasov (URS)
1986	(East Germany) Suhl	Petr Kůrka (TCH)	Malcolm Cooper (GBR)	Pavel Soukeník (TCH)
1990	(Soviet Union) Moscow	Eun Chul Lee (KOR)	Robert Foth (USA)	Hrachya Petikyan (URS)
1994	(Italy) Milan	Petr Kůrka (CZE)	Thomas Tamas (USA)	Wolfram Waibel Jr. (AUT)
1998	(Spain) Barcelona	Jozef Gönci (SVK)	Pascal Bessy (FRA)	Rajmond Debevec (SLO)
2002	(Finland) Lahti	Marcel Bürge (SUI)	Konstantin Prikhodtchenko (RUS)	Péter Sidi (HUN)
2006	(Croatia) Zagreb	Artem Khadjibekov (RUS)	Stevan Pletikosic (SCG)	Lei Zhang (CHN)
2010	(Germany) Munich	Péter Sidi (HUN)	Han Jin-seop (KOR)	Nemanja Mirosavljev (SRB)
2014	(Spain) Granada	Zhu Qinan (CHN)	Sergey Kamenskiy (RUS)	Vitaly Bubnovich (BLR)
2018	(South Korea) Changwon	Tomasz Bartnik (POL)	Petar Gorsa (CRO)	Michael McPhail (USA)
2022	(Egypt) New Administrative Capital	Serhiy Kulish (UKR)	Tomasz Bartnik (POL)	Jon-Hermann Hegg (NOR)
2023	(Azerbaijan) Baku	Alexander Schmirl (AUT)	Petr Nymburský (CZE)	Akhil Sheoran (IND)
2025	(Egypt) Cairo	Liu Yukun (CHN)	Aishwary Pratap Singh Tomar (IND)	Romain Aufrere (FRA)
2026	(Qatar) Doha	Dmitrii Pimenov (AIN)	Patrik Jány (SVK)	Niraj Kumar (IND)

== World Championships, Men Team ==
Year	Place	Gold	Silver	Bronze
1949	(Argentina) Buenos Aires	(Finland) Finland; Olavi Elo; Pauli Aapeli Janhonen; Kullervo Leskinen; Toivo Maenttaeri; Vilho Ilmari Ylönen	(Sweden) Sweden; Uno Hilding Berg; Isac Holger Erben; Walther Sigfrid Fröstell; Kurt Johansson; Jonas Jonsson	(Norway) Norway; Mauritz Amundsen; Johan Hunæs; Erling Asbjoern Kongshaug; Willy Røgeberg; Thore Skredegaard
1952	(Norway) Oslo	(Switzerland) Switzerland; Robert Bürchler; Ernst Huber; Otto Horber; August Hollenstein; Schmid E.	(Sweden) Sweden; Uno Hilding Berg; Isac Holger Erben; Walther Sigfrid Fröstell; Kurt Johansson; Lindquist T.	(Norway) Norway; Mauritz Amundsen; Johan Hunæs; Erling Asbjoern Kongshaug; Halvor Kongsjorden; Thore Skredegaard
1954	(Venezuela) Caracas	(Soviet Union) Soviet Union; Anatoli Bogdanov; Vasily Borisov; Moysey Itkis; Grigori Kupko; Boris Pereberin	(Sweden) Sweden; Uno Hilding Berg; Isac Holger Erben; Walther Sigfrid Fröstell; Anders Helge Kvissberg; Sundberg O.	(Norway) Norway; Mauritz Amundsen; Iver Aas; Anker Hagen; Erling Asbjoern Kongshaug; Thore Skredegaard
1958	(Soviet Union) Moscow	(Soviet Union) Soviet Union; Vasily Borisov; Moysey Itkis; Yuri Kudryashov; Marat Niyazov; Victor Shamburkin	(West Germany) West Germany; Hans Werner Harbeck; Peter Kohnke; Bernd Klingner; Helmut Schlenker; Rudolf Sigl	United States; James Carter; Herr J. Daniel Puckel; Gordon Taras; Verle Wright Jr.
1962	(Egypt) Cairo	(Soviet Union) Soviet Union; Vladimir Chuian; Vasily Borisov; Moysey Itkis; Marat Niyazov	United States; Gary Anderson; Tommy Pool; Daniel Puckel; Verle Wright Jr.	(Switzerland) Switzerland; August Hollenstein; Kurt Müller; Hans Rudolf Spillmann; Erwin Vogt
1966	(West Germany) Wiesbaden	United States; Gary Anderson; Tommy Pool; Margaret Thompson; Lones Wigger	(Soviet Union) Soviet Union; Aleksandrs Gerasimjonoks; Valentin Kornev; Vladimir Konyakhin; Marat Niyazov	(East Germany) East Germany; Werner Lippoldt; Guenter Lange; Dieter Munzert; Hartmut Sommer
1970	(United States) Phoenix	(Soviet Union) Soviet Union; Vladimir Agishev; Oleg Lapkin; Vitali Parkhimovitch; Sergei Yermilov	United States; David Boyd; John Robert Foster; John Writer; Lones Wigger	(West Germany) West Germany; Peter Kohnke; Bernd Klingner; Gottfried Kustermann; Klaus Zähringer
1974	(Switzerland) Thun	United States; Lanny Bassham; Margaret Murdock; Lones Wigger; John Writer	(Soviet Union) Soviet Union; Anatoli Bulgakov; Gennadi Lushikov; Alexander Mitrofanov; Vitali Parkhimovitch	(West Germany) West Germany; Bernd Klingner; Gottfried Kustermann; Wolfgang Ruehle; Klaus Zähringer
1978	(South Korea) Seoul	United States; Lanny Bassham; Edward Etzel; Rod Fitz-Randolph; Lones Wigger	(West Germany) West Germany; Gottfried Kustermann; Ulrich Lind; Werner Seibold; Karlheinz Smieszek	(Sweden) Sweden; Sven Johansson; Carl-Erik Oeberg; Esbjoern Svensson; Stefan Thynell
1982	(Venezuela) Caracas	(Soviet Union) Soviet Union; Kirill Ivanov; Vladimir Lvov; Alexander Mitrofanov; Viktor Vlasov	(United Kingdom) Great Britain; Alister Allan; Malcolm Cooper; Barry Dagger; John Davis	(Norway) Norway; Arnt-Olav Haugland; Terje Melbye-Hansen; Harald Stenvaag; Geir Skirbekk
1986	(East Germany) Suhl	(Czechoslovakia) Czechoslovakia; Milan Bakeš; Petr Kůrka; Pavel Soukeník	(Soviet Union) Soviet Union; Kirill Ivanov; Hrachya Petikyan; Viktor Vlasov	France; Jean-Pierre Amat; Pascal Bessy; Michel Bury
1990	(Soviet Union) Moscow	(Soviet Union) Soviet Union; Viatcheslav Botchkarev; Kirill Ivanov; Hrachya Petikyan	(Czechoslovakia) Czechoslovakia; Milan Bakeš; Petr Kůrka; Miroslav Varga	(Socialist Federal Republic of Yugoslavia) Yugoslavia; Rajmond Debevec; Nemanja Mirosavljev; Goran Maksimović
1994	(Italy) Milan	France; Jean-Pierre Amat; Michel Bury; Roger Chassat	(Ukraine) Ukraine; Artur Ayvazyan; Oleg Dementyev; Oleg Mykhaylov	(Czech Republic) Czech Republic; Milan Bakeš; Vaclav Becvar; Petr Kůrka
1998	(Spain) Barcelona	(Ukraine) Ukraine; Artur Ayvazyan; Oleg Mykhaylov; Jury Sukhorukov	France; Pascal Bessy; Jean-Pierre Amat; Roger Chassat	(Russia) Russia; Alexander Koudelin; Artem Khadjibekov; Sergei Kovalenko
2002	(Finland) Lahti	(Russia) Russia; Artem Khadjibekov; Viatcheslav Botchkarev; Konstantin Prikhodtchenko	United States; Michael Anti; Matthew Emmons; Glenn Dubis	(Ukraine) Ukraine; Jury Sukhorukov; Oleg Mykhaylov; Artur Ayvazyan
2006	(Croatia) Zagreb	(Russia) Russia; Artem Khadjibekov; Sergei Kovalenko; Viatcheslav Botchkarev	(Austria) Austria; Thomas Farnik; Mario Knögler; Christian Planer	United States; Matthew Emmons; Jason Parker; Michael Mcphail
2010	(Germany) Munich	(Russia) Russia; Artem Khadjibekov; Fedor Vlasov; Konstantin Prikhodtchenko	(Norway) Norway; Vebjørn Berg; Ole-Kristian Bryhn; Ole Magnus Bakken	(Ukraine) Ukraine; Artur Ayvazyan; Jury Sukhorukov; Vladyslav Hryhorenko
2014	(Spain) Granada	(China); Cao Yifei; Zhu Qinan; Kang Hongwei	(Norway) Norway; Are Hansen; Ole-Kristian Bryhn; Ole Magnus Bakken	(Russia) Russia; Nazar Louginets; Sergey Kamenskiy; Fedor Vlasov
2018	(South Korea) Changwon	(Russia) Russia; Nazar Louginets; Vladimir Maslennikov; Sergey Kamenskiy	(China); Haoran Yang; Zicheng Hui; Yuncong Yao	(Belarus) Belarus; Yury Shcherbatsevich; Vitali Bubnovich; Illia Charheika
2022	(Egypt) New Administrative Capital	Norway; Simon Claussen; Jon-Hermann Hegg; Henrik Larsen	France; Brian Baudouin; Michael d'Halluin; Lucas Kryzs	India; Niraj Kumar; Swapnil Kusale; Aishwary Pratap Singh Tomar

== World Championships, Women ==
Year	Place	Gold	Silver	Bronze
1966	(West Germany) Wiesbaden	Margaret Thompson (USA)	Anneliese Goth (FRG)	Tatiana Ryabinskaya (URS)
1970	(United States) Phoenix	Margaret Murdock (USA)	Desanka Perović (YUG)	Lucia Fagereva (URS)
1974	(Switzerland) Thun	Anka Pelova (BUL)	Nonka Shatarova (BUL)	Margaret Murdock (USA)
1978	(South Korea) Seoul	Wanda Oliver (USA)	Karen Monez (USA)	Christina Gustafsson (SWE)
1982	(Venezuela) Caracas	Marlies Helbig (GDR)	Lessia Leskiv (URS)	Anna Malakhova (URS)
1986	(East Germany) Suhl	Vesela Letcheva (BUL)	Valentina Lazarova (BUL)	Angela Berger (GDR)
1990	(Soviet Union) Moscow	Vesela Letcheva (BUL)	Deena Wigger (USA)	Anitza Valkova (BUL)
1994	(Italy) Milan	Anna Maloukhina (RUS)	Lessia Leskiv (UKR)	Irina Gerasimenok (RUS)
1998	(Spain) Barcelona	Sonja Pfeilschifter (GER)	Xian Wang (CHN)	Nonka Matova (BUL)
2002	(Finland) Lahti	Petra Horneber (GER)	Natallia Kalnysh (UKR)	Martina Prekel (GER)
2006	(Croatia) Zagreb	Lioubov Galkina (RUS)	Sylwia Bogacka (POL)	Sonja Pfeilschifter (GER)
2010	(Germany) Munich	Barbara Lechner (GER)	Sonja Pfeilschifter (GER)	Annik Marguet (SUI)
2014	(Spain) Granada	Beate Gauß (GER)	Snježana Pejčić (CRO)	Malin Westerheim (NOR)
2018	(South Korea) Changwon	Yulia Karimova (RUS)	Isabella Straub (GER)	Snježana Pejčić (CRO)
2022	(Egypt) New Administrative Capital	Miao Wanru (CHN)	Jenny Stene (NOR)	Jeanette Hegg Duestad (NOR)
2023	(Azerbaijan) Baku	Zhang Qiongyue (CHN)	Han Jiayu (CHN)	Sagen Maddalena (USA)
2025	(Egypt) Cairo	Jeanette Hegg Duestad (NOR)	Emely Jäggi (SUI)	Seonaid McIntosh (GBR)
2026	(Qatar) Doha	Aleksandra Stojadinović (SRB)	Oh Se-hee (KOR)	Misaki Nobata (JPN)

== World Championships, Women Team ==
Year	Place	Gold	Silver	Bronze
1970	(United States) Phoenix	United States; Tammie Foster; Margaret Murdock; Diana Timberlake	(Soviet Union) Soviet Union; Lucia Fagereva; Tatiana Ratnikova; Elena Zaharchenko	(East Germany) East Germany; Gudrun Mehlan; Marga Nabel; Gabriele Riedel
1974	(Switzerland) Thun	(Soviet Union) Soviet Union; Kira Boiko; Tatiana Ratnikova; Baiba Zarina	(Bulgaria) Bulgaria; Poliksena Kancheva; Anka Pelova; Nonka Shatarova	(West Germany) West Germany; Elke Becker; Elisabeth Balș; Elisabeth Boehmer
1978	(South Korea) Seoul	United States; Becky Braun; Karen Monez; Wanda Oliver	(Sweden) Sweden; Anita Enqvist; Christina Gustafsson; Margareta Gustafsson	France; Yvette Courault; Dominique Esnault; Elisabeth Lesou
1982	(Venezuela) Caracas	(Soviet Union) Soviet Union; Svetlana Komaristova; Lessia Leskiv; Anna Malakhova	(East Germany) East Germany; Gilda Gorzkulla; Marlies Helbig; Marlies Moch	United States; Mary Godlove; Karen Monez; Gloria Parmentier
1986	(East Germany) Suhl	(Bulgaria) Bulgaria; Valentina Lazarova; Vesela Letcheva; Nonka Matova	(East Germany) East Germany; Angela Berger; Sabine Toth; Kathrin Starkloff	United States; Wanda Jewell; Pat Spurgin; Deena Wigger
1990	(Soviet Union) Moscow	(Bulgaria) Bulgaria; Vesela Letcheva; Nonka Matova; Anitza Valkova	United States; Launi Meili; Kristen Peterson; Deena Wigger	(Soviet Union) Soviet Union; Valentina Cherkasova; Lessia Leskiv; Iryna Shylava
1994	(Italy) Milan	(Germany); Petra Horneber; Kirsten Obel; Wera Stamm	(Russia) Russia; Valentina Cherkasova; Irina Gerasimenok; Anna Maloukhina	(China); Muhua Chen; Qiuping Zhang; Danhong Zhou
1998	(Spain) Barcelona	(China); Hong Shan; Xian Wang; Yimin Xu	United States; Elizabeth Bourland; Jayme Dickman; Wanda Jewell	(Bulgaria) Bulgaria; Ani Ivanova; Vesela Letcheva; Nonka Matova
2002	(Finland) Lahti	(Ukraine) Ukraine; Olena Davydova; Natallia Kalnysh; Lessia Leskiv	(Germany); Petra Horneber; Sonja Pfeilschifter; Martina Prekel	(Russia) Russia; Tatiana Goldobina; Lioubov Galkina; Marina Bobkova
2006	(Croatia) Zagreb	(Russia) Russia; Lioubov Galkina; Tatiana Goldobina; Alena Nizkoshapskaia	(Germany); Barbara Lechner; Claudia Keck; Sonja Pfeilschifter	(China); Bo Liu; Liuxi Wu; Jieyi Tang
2010	(Germany) Munich	United States; Jamie Beyerle; Amy Sowash; Sandra Fong	(Germany); Barbara Lechner; Eva Friedel; Sonja Pfeilschifter	(Serbia) Serbia; Ivana Maksimović; Andrea Arsović; Lidija Mihajlović
2014	(Spain) Granada	(Germany); Beate Gauß; Barbara Engleder; Eva Rösken	(China); Chen Dongqi; Chang Jing; Zhao Huixin	(South Korea) South Korea; Jeong Mi-ra; Yoo Seo-young; Kim Seo-la
2018	(South Korea) Changwon	(Germany); Isabella Straub; Jolyn Beer; Jaqueline Orth	(Denmark) Denmark; Rikke Maeng Ibsen; Stine Nielsen; Stephanie Laura Scurrah Grundsoee	(Russia) Russia; Yulia Karimova; Polina Khorosheva; Yulia Zykova
2022	(Egypt) New Administrative Capital	Germany; Jolyn Beer; Anna Janssen; Lisa Müller	Switzerland; Nina Christen; Sarina Hitz; Franziska Stark	China; Miao Wanru; Shi Mengyao; Zhang Qiongyue

== World Championships, Mixed Team ==
Year	Place	Gold	Silver	Bronze
2022	(Egypt) New Administrative Capital	Norway; Jenny Stene; Simon Claussen	Denmark; Stephanie Grundsøe; Steffen Olsen	Germany; David Koenders; Anna Janssen

== Current world records ==
Current world records in 50 metre rifle three positions
Men	Qualification	1188	Jan Lochbihler (SUI)	August 28, 2019	Rio de Janeiro (BRA)
Men	Final	466.0	Zhang Changhong (CHN)	Aug 2, 2021	Tokyo (JPN)
Men	Teams	3549	Norway (Claussen, Larsen, Hegg)	May 29, 2021	Osijek (CRO)
Junior Men	Qualification	1185	Filip Nepejchal (CZE); Istvan Peni (HUN)	May 22, 2017; October 29, 2017	Munich (GER); New Delhi (IND)
Junior Men	Final	462.9	Filip Nepejchal (CZE)	November 19, 2019	Putian (CHN)
Junior Men	Teams	3512	Hungary (Peni, Vas, Pekler)	June 27, 2017	Suhl (GER)
Women (ISSF)	Qualification	1185	Jenny Stene (NOR)	May 28, 2019	Munich (GER)
Women (ISSF)	Final	464.7	Petra Zublasing (ITA)	June 19, 2015	Baku (AZE)
Women (ISSF)	Teams	3531	Norway (Stene, Duestad, Lund)	September 21, 2019	Bologna (ITA)
Women (CISM)	Individual	1183	Yulia Karimova (RUS)	3 June 2018	Thun (SUI)
Women (CISM)	Teams	3499	China (Gao, Shi, Wan)	3 June 2018	Thun (SUI)
Junior Women	Qualification	1180	Fu Yutian (CHN)	July 18, 2019	Suhl (GER)
Junior Women	Final	459.3	Anna Janssen (GER)	September 15, 2019	Bologna (ITA)
Junior Women	Teams	3509	Germany (Janssen, Ruschel, Weindorf); China (Fu, Chen, Hou)	July 18, 2019; July 18, 2019	Suhl (GER); Suhl (GER)
