= 300 m standard rifle =

International Sports Shooting Federation event

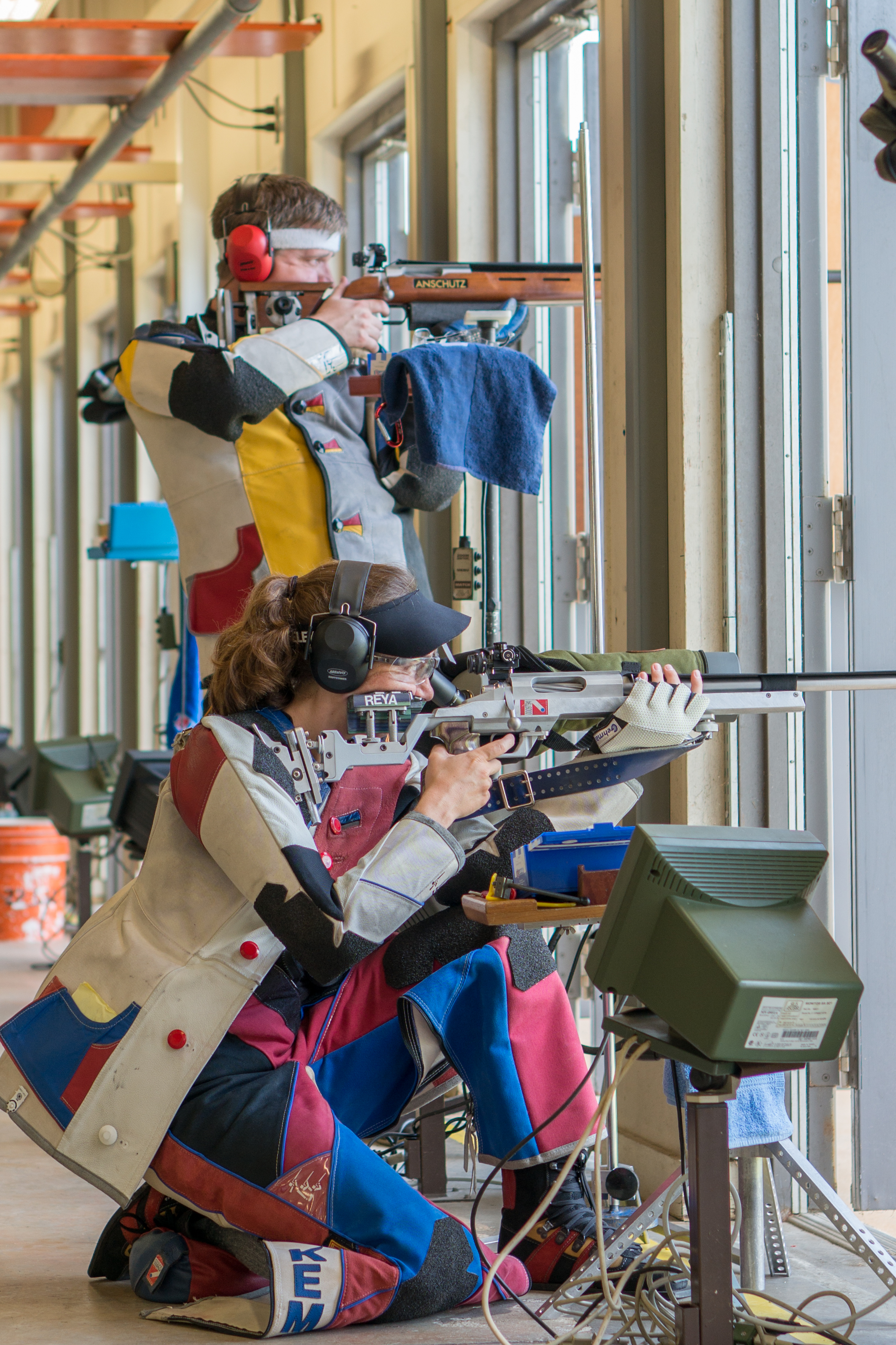

Men
- Number of shots: 3x20
- World Championships: Since 1947
- Abbreviation: 300STR3X20

300 m standard rifle is one of the ISSF shooting events. It is similar to 300 metre rifle but there are more restrictions on the rifle (quite similar to those in 10 metre air rifle). The course of fire is a three positions program of 3x20 shots. This event is based in competitions with army-style rifles, and in this form dates back at least to the 19th century, although the early championships had a true army rifle event, using the model of the host country's choice. The standard rifle event as such was introduced in 1947.

300 metre standard rifle is also on the program of the CISM military world championships.

== Equipment ==
The rifle must satisfy dimensional, weight, and other requirements stipulated in the rulebook. Iron sights, rather than telescopic or other sights must be used, and muzzle brakes are not permitted. Trigger pull weight must be at least 1,500 grams, rifle weight may not exceed 5.5 kg, and barrel may not be longer than 762 mm. The calibre may not exceed 8 mm, although 6 mm BR is the most common. The same rifle must be used in all positions without any changes except adjustment of the butt plate, handstop or rear sight.

== World Championships, Men ==
Year	Place	Gold	Silver	Bronze
1947	(Sweden) Stockholm	Kurt Johansson (SWE)	Walther Sigfrid Fröstell (SWE)	Otto Horber (SUI)
1949	(Argentina) Buenos Aires	Isac Holger Erben (SWE)	Walther Sigfrid Fröstell (SWE)	Harvey Dias Villela (BRA)
1952	(Norway) Oslo	August Hollenstein (SUI)	Walther Sigfrid Fröstell (SWE)	Arthur Charles Jackson (USA)
1954	(Venezuela) Caracas	Walther Sigfrid Fröstell (SWE)	Anders Helge Kvissberg (SWE)	Matallana J. (COL)
1958	(Soviet Union) Moscow	Anatoly Tilik (URS)	Moysey Itkis (URS)	Boris Pereberin (URS)
1962	(Egypt) Cairo	Pauli Aapeli Janhonen (FIN)	Verle Franklin Jun. Wright (USA)	Andrey Jakonyuk (URS)
1966	(West Germany) Wiesbaden	Ludwig Lustberg (URS)	Vladimir Konyakhin (URS)	Gary Anderson (USA)
1970	(United States) Phoenix	John Robert Foster (USA)	Vladimir Agishev (URS)	Valentin Kornev (URS)
1974	(Switzerland) Thun	David Kimes (USA)	Lones Wigger (USA)	John Robert Foster (USA)
1978	(South Korea) Seoul	David Kimes (USA)	Yves Prouzet (FRA)	Malcolm Cooper (GBR)
1982	(Venezuela) Caracas	Harald Stenvaag (NOR)	Lones Wigger (USA)	Vladimir Lvov (URS)
1986	(Sweden) Skövde	Malcolm Cooper (GBR)	Harald Stenvaag (NOR)	Mauri Roeppaenen (FIN)
1990	(Soviet Union) Moscow	Glenn Dubis (USA)	Norbert Sturny (SUI)	Malcolm Cooper (GBR)
1994	(Italy) Tolmezzo	Jukka Salonen (FIN)	Milan Bakeš (CZE)	Harri Marjala (FIN)
1998	(Spain) Zaragoza	Espen Berg-Knutsen (NOR)	Rudolf Krenn (GER)	Stephen Goff (USA)
2002	(Finland) Lahti	Marcel Bürge (SUI)	Milan Mach (CZE)	Arild Roeyseth (NOR)
2006	(Croatia) Zagreb	Thomas Farnik (AUT)	Per Sandberg (SWE)	Vebjørn Berg (NOR)
2010	(Germany) Munich	Josselin Henry (FRA)	Robert Markoja (SLO)	Vebjørn Berg (NOR)
2014	(Spain) Granada	Cyril Graff (FRA)	Ole-Kristian Bryhn (NOR)	Marcel Bürge (SUI)
2018	(South Korea) Changwon	Aleksi Leppä (FIN)	Karl Olsson (SWE)	Odd Arne Brekne (NOR)

== World Championships, Men's Team ==
Year	Place	Gold	Silver	Bronze
1947	(Sweden) Stockholm	(Sweden) Sweden; Uno Hilding Berg; Isac Holger Erben; Walther Sigfrid Fröstell; Kurt Johansson; Wickstroem T.	(Switzerland) Switzerland; Otto Horber; Ernst Tellenbach; Karl Zimmermann; Emil Gruenig; Robert Bürchler	(Argentina) Argentina; Antonio Ando; Juan Pablo de Marchi; Pablo Cagnasso; Casaza J. Antonio Ortiz
1949	(Argentina) Buenos Aires	(Sweden) Sweden; Uno Hilding Berg; Isac Holger Erben; Sven Dessle; Walther Sigfrid Fröstell; Kurt Johansson	(Socialist Federal Republic of Yugoslavia) Yugoslavia; Pero Cestnik; Jovan Kratohvil; Milovan Mihorko; Momir Markovic; Stevo Prauhardt	(Switzerland) Switzerland; Robert Bürchler; Emil Gruenig; Otto Horber; Werner Jakober; Ernst Kramer
1952	(Norway) Oslo	(Switzerland) Switzerland; Clavadetscher G. Robert Bürchler; Emil Gruenig; Otto Horber; August Hollenstein	(Sweden) Sweden; Uno Hilding Berg; Isac Holger Erben; Walther Sigfrid Fröstell; Kurt Johansson; Anders Helge Kvissberg	(Norway) Norway; Mauritz Amundsen; Lars L. Ese; Halvor Kongsjorden; Odd Sannes; Thurmann-Nielsen O.
1954	(Venezuela) Caracas	(Sweden) Sweden; Uno Hilding Berg; Isac Holger Erben; Walther Sigfrid Fröstell; Anders Helge Kvissberg; Ohlsson O.	(Socialist Federal Republic of Yugoslavia) Yugoslavia; Gradimir Boncic; Josip Ćuk; Bogdan Jez; Zlatko Mašek; Stevo Prauhardt	(Finland) Finland; Esa Einari Kervinen; Jari Paelve; Mikko Johannes Nordquist; Jorma Tuomas Taitto; Vilho Ilmari Ylönen
1958	(Soviet Union) Moscow	(Soviet Union) Soviet Union; Moysey Itkis; Iosif Meytin; Anatoly Tilik; Boris Pereberin; Viktor Shamburkin	(Socialist Federal Republic of Yugoslavia) Yugoslavia; Vladimir Grozdanović; Kresimir Anic; Dragoljub Milenkovic; Miroslav Stojanović; Miodrag Zivanovic	(Finland) Finland; Pauli Aapeli Janhonen; Esa Einari Kervinen; Parkkari K. Jorma Tuomas Taitto; Vilho Ilmari Ylönen
1962	(Egypt) Cairo	(Soviet Union) Soviet Union; Vasily Borisov; Moysey Itkis; Andrey Jakonyuk; Eduard Jarosh	(Norway) Norway; Jon Istad; Thormod Næs; Olay Medaas; Axel Marthinsen	(Finland) Finland; Pauli Aapeli Janhonen; Esa Einari Kervinen; Antti Rissanen; Vilho Ilmari Ylönen
1966	(West Germany) Wiesbaden	(Soviet Union) Soviet Union; Eduard Jarosh; Vladimir Konyakhin; Yuri Kudryashov; Ludwig Lustberg	(Switzerland) Switzerland; August Hollenstein; Kurt Mueller; Hans Simonet; Erwin Vogt	United States of America; Donald Adams; Gary Anderson; Martin Gunnarsson; Bill Krilling
1970	(United States) Phoenix	(Soviet Union) Soviet Union; Vladimir Agishev; Viktor Avilov; Valentin Kornev; Yuri Kudryashov	United States of America; Lanny Bassham; John Robert Foster; Bruce Meredith; Lones Wigger	(Poland) Poland; Barnaba Fandier; Eugeniusz Pędzisz; Andrzej Sieledcow; Andrzej Trajda
1974	(Switzerland) Thun	United States of America; David Boyd; John Robert Foster; David Kimes; Lones Wigger	(Soviet Union) Soviet Union; Vladimir Agishev; Valentin Kornev; Gennadi Lushikov; Boris Melnik	(Czechoslovakia) Czechoslovakia; Karel Bulan; Petr Kovářík; František Prokop; Antonín Schwarz
1978	(South Korea) Seoul	United States of America; Boyd Goldsby; David Kimes; Lones Wigger; Webster Wright	(Switzerland) Switzerland; Kuno Bertschy; Pierre-Alain Dufaux; Walter Inderbitzin; Robert Weilenmann	(Finland) Finland; Osmo Ala-Honkola; Juhani Laakso; Jaakko Minkkinen; Mauri Roeppaenen
1982	(Venezuela) Caracas	(Switzerland) Switzerland; Hans Braem; Martin Billeter; Kuno Bertschy; Beat Carabin	(Norway) Norway; Tore Hartz; Trond Kjøll; Geir Skirbekk; Harald Stenvaag	(Soviet Union) Soviet Union; Victor Daniltchenko; Vladimir Lvov; Gennadi Lushikov; Viktor Vlasov
1986	(Sweden) Skövde	(Finland) Finland; Kalle Leskinen; Mauri Roeppaenen; Ralf Westerlund	United States of America; Glenn Dubis; David Kimes; Lones Wigger	(Soviet Union) Soviet Union; Alexander Bulkin; Alexander Mitrofanov; Viktor Vlasov
1990	(Soviet Union) Moscow	United States of America; Bradley Carnes; Glenn Dubis; Stephen Goff	(Switzerland) Switzerland; Heinz Braem; Pierre-Alain Dufaux; Norbert Sturny	(Finland) Finland; Kalle Leskinen; Tapio Säynevirta; Ralf Westerlund
1994	(Italy) Tolmezzo	United States of America; Glenn Dubis; Robert Foth; Webster Wright III	(Finland) Finland; Harri Marjala; Tapio Säynevirta; Jukka Salonen	(Germany) Germany; Christian Bauer; Rudolf Krenn; Bernd Ruecker
1998	(Spain) Zaragoza	United States of America; Robert Foth; Stephen Goff; Glenn Dubis	(Switzerland) Switzerland; Olivier Cottagnoud; Norbert Sturny; Beat Stadler	(Finland) Finland; Erkki Matilainen; Jukka Salonen; Tapio Säynevirta
2002	(Finland) Lahti	(Switzerland) Switzerland; Marcel Bürge; Daniel Burger; Norbert Sturny	(Czech Republic) Czech Republic; Milan Bakeš; Milan Mach; Lubos Opelka	United States of America; Glenn Dubis; Jason Parker; Thomas Tamas
2006	(Croatia) Zagreb	(Belarus) Belarus; Anatoli Klimenko; Vitali Bubnovich; Sergei Martynov	(Norway) Norway; Vebjørn Berg; Hans Bakken; Espen Berg-Knutsen	United States of America; Stephen Goff; Jason Parker; Robert Harbison
2010	(Germany) Munich	(Switzerland) Switzerland; Beat Müller; Marcel Bürge; Olivier Schaffter	(Norway) Norway; Vebjørn Berg; Ole-Kristian Bryhn; Stian Bogar	(Slovenia) Slovenia; Robert Markoja; Rajmond Debevec; Dusan Zisko
2014	(Spain) Granada	(Norway) Norway; Odd Arne Brekne; Kim Andre Lund; Ole-Kristian Bryhn	(Switzerland) Switzerland; Marcel Bürge; Claude-Alain Delley; Olivier Schaffter	(France) France; Valérian Sauveplane; Josselin Henry; Cyril Graff
2018	(South Korea) Changwon	(Norway) Norway; Odd Arne Brekne; Kim Andre Lund; Ole-Kristian Bryhn	(South Korea) Republic of Korea; Choi Young Jeon; Lee Won-Gyu; Cheon Min Ho	(Switzerland) Switzerland; Jan Lochbihler; Gilles Vincent Dufaux; Andrea Rossi

== World Championships, total medals ==
Rank	Nation	Gold	Silver	Bronze	Total
1	United States	9	5	7	21
2	Switzerland	6	7	4	17
3	Sweden	6	7	0	13
4	Soviet Union	6	4	6	16
5	Norway	4	6	5	15
6	Finland	4	1	8	13
7	France	2	1	1	4
8	Great Britain	1	0	2	3
9	Austria	1	0	0	1
9	Belarus	1	0	0	1
11	Czech Republic	0	3	0	3
11	Yugoslavia	0	3	0	3
13	Germany	0	1	1	2
13	Slovenia	0	1	1	2
15	South Korea	0	1	0	1
16	Argentina	0	0	1	1
16	Brazil	0	0	1	1
16	Colombia	0	0	1	1
16	Czechoslovakia	0	0	1	1
16	Poland	0	0	1	1
Totals (20 entries)		40	40	40	120

== Current world records ==
Current world records in 300 metre standard rifle
Men (ISSF)	Individual	591	Bernhard Pickl (AUT)	September 25, 2019	Tolmezzo (ITA)
Men (ISSF)	Teams	1765	Norway (Wear, Lund, Claussen)	24 September 2019	Tolmezzo (ITA)
Men (CISM)	Individual	590	Steffen Olsen (DEN); Kim Andre Lund (NOR)	31 May 2018; 1 June 2018	Thun (SUI)
Men (CISM)	Teams	1752	Norway (Lund, Brekne, Bryhn)	31 May 2018	Thun (SUI)

== See also ==
- European Shooting Confederation
- International Shooting Sport Federation
- ISSF shooting events
- 1959 European 300 m Rifle Championships
