= 1962 ISSF World Shooting Championships =

International sport shooting competition

The 38th UIT World Shooting Championships was the contemporary name of the ISSF World Shooting Championships in all ISSF shooting events that were held in Cairo, Egypt in 1962.

== Medal count ==
* Host nation (Egypt)

Rank	Nation	Gold	Silver	Bronze	Total
1	Soviet Union (URS)	22	11	4	37
2	United States (USA)	7	13	10	30
3	Switzerland (SUI)	2	5	6	13
4	West Germany (FRG)	2	1	2	5
5	Sweden (SWE)	1	0	4	5
6	Finland (FIN)	1	0	2	3
7	Venezuela (VEN)	1	0	0	1
8	East Germany (GDR)	0	1	4	5
9	Hungary (HUN)	0	1	0	1
9	India (IND)	0	1	0	1
9	Japan (JPN)	0	1	0	1
9	Norway (NOR)	0	1	0	1
9	South Africa (SAF)	0	1	0	1
14	Denmark (DEN)	0	0	1	1
14	Egypt (EGY)*	0	0	1	1
14	Great Britain (GBR)	0	0	1	1
14	Italy (ITA)	0	0	1	1
Totals (17 entries)		36	36	36	108

== Rifle events ==
=== Men ===
Individual			Teams		
300 metre rifle three positions
1st place, gold medalist(s)	Gary Anderson (USA)	1138	1st place, gold medalist(s)	Soviet Union	4533
2nd place, silver medalist(s)	Vladimir Yevdokimov (URS)	1138	2nd place, silver medalist(s)	United States	4516
3rd place, bronze medalist(s)	Tommy Pool (USA)	1136	3rd place, bronze medalist(s)	Switzerland	4502
300 metre rifle prone
1st place, gold medalist(s)	Gary Anderson (USA)	395	No championship		
2nd place, silver medalist(s)	Hans Rudolf Spillmann (SUI)	394	No championship		
3rd place, bronze medalist(s)	Kurt Johansson (SWE)	393	No championship		
300 metre rifle kneeling
1st place, gold medalist(s)	Erwin Vogt (SUI)	385	No championship		
2nd place, silver medalist(s)	Kurt Müller (SUI)	385	No championship		
3rd place, bronze medalist(s)	Vladimir Yevdokimov (URS)	384	No championship		
300 metre rifle standing
1st place, gold medalist(s)	Tommy Pool (USA)	368	No championship		
2nd place, silver medalist(s)	Jozsef Lacsny (HUN)	364	No championship		
3rd place, bronze medalist(s)	Daniel Puckel (USA)	363	No championship		
300 metre standard rifle
1st place, gold medalist(s)	Pauli Aapeli Janhonen (FIN)	537	1st place, gold medalist(s)	Soviet Union	2125
2nd place, silver medalist(s)	Verle Franklin Wright, Jr. (USA)	537	2nd place, silver medalist(s)	Norway	2086
3rd place, bronze medalist(s)	Andrey Jakonyuk (URS)	536	3rd place, bronze medalist(s)	Finland	2077
300 metre army rifle (30 fast shots)
1st place, gold medalist(s)	Hans Schönenberger (SUI)	6	No championship		
2nd place, silver medalist(s)	August Hollenstein (SUI)	5	No championship		
3rd place, bronze medalist(s)	Hans Simonet (SUI)		No championship		
50 metre rifle three positions
1st place, gold medalist(s)	Gary Anderson (USA)	1157	1st place, gold medalist(s)	Soviet Union	4533
2nd place, silver medalist(s)	Marat Niyazov (URS)	1147	2nd place, silver medalist(s)	United States	4522
3rd place, bronze medalist(s)	Erwin Vogt (SUI)	1142	3rd place, bronze medalist(s)	Switzerland	4508
50 metre rifle prone
1st place, gold medalist(s)	Karl Wenk (FRG)	594	1st place, gold medalist(s)	Sweden	2355
2nd place, silver medalist(s)	Vladimir Chuian (URS)	592	2nd place, silver medalist(s)	United States	2354
3rd place, bronze medalist(s)	James Enoch Hill (USA)	592	3rd place, bronze medalist(s)	West Germany	2351
50 metre rifle kneeling
1st place, gold medalist(s)	Karl Wenk (FRG)	388	1st place, gold medalist(s)	Soviet Union	1533
2nd place, silver medalist(s)	Marat Niyazov (URS)	387	2nd place, silver medalist(s)	West Germany	1531
3rd place, bronze medalist(s)	Ole Christian Hviid Jensen (DEN)	387	3rd place, bronze medalist(s)	United States	1522
50 metre rifle standing
1st place, gold medalist(s)	Gary Anderson (USA)	376	1st place, gold medalist(s)	United States	1464
2nd place, silver medalist(s)	Erwin Vogt (SUI)	367	2nd place, silver medalist(s)	Switzerland	1442
3rd place, bronze medalist(s)	Tommy Pool (USA)	366	3rd place, bronze medalist(s)	East Germany	1428

=== Women ===
Individual
50 metre rifle three positions (3×30)
1st place, gold medalist(s)	Kira Dolgoborodova (URS)	864
2nd place, silver medalist(s)	Yelena Donskaya (URS)	853
3rd place, bronze medalist(s)	Renate Wischnewski (GDR)	824
50 metre rifle prone
1st place, gold medalist(s)	Yelena Donskaya (URS)	586
2nd place, silver medalist(s)	Marjorie Dunt (RSA)	583
3rd place, bronze medalist(s)	Anneliese Goth (FRG)	582

== Pistol events ==
=== Men ===
Individual			Teams		
50 metre pistol
1st place, gold medalist(s)	Vladimir Stolypin (URS)	559	1st place, gold medalist(s)	Soviet Union	2187
2nd place, silver medalist(s)	Yoshihisa Yoshikawa (JPN)	557	2nd place, silver medalist(s)	United States	2169
3rd place, bronze medalist(s)	Ludwig Hemauer (SUI)	550	3rd place, bronze medalist(s)	Switzerland	2151
25 metre rapid fire pistol
1st place, gold medalist(s)	Alexander Zabelin (URS)	589	1st place, gold medalist(s)	Soviet Union	2333
2nd place, silver medalist(s)	Igor Bakalov (URS)	588	2nd place, silver medalist(s)	United States	2327
3rd place, bronze medalist(s)	James Henderson McNally (USA)	588	3rd place, bronze medalist(s)	Italy	2312
25 metre center-fire pistol
1st place, gold medalist(s)	Igor Bakalov (URS)	590	1st place, gold medalist(s)	Soviet Union	2349
2nd place, silver medalist(s)	Efim Haydurov (URS)	589	2nd place, silver medalist(s)	United States	2341
3rd place, bronze medalist(s)	William Blankenship (USA)	588	3rd place, bronze medalist(s)	East Germany	2314

=== Women ===
Individual
25 metre rapid fire pistol
1st place, gold medalist(s)	Sofia Tyagny (URS)	583
2nd place, silver medalist(s)	Naghezda Yulina (URS)	579
3rd place, bronze medalist(s)	Gertrude Schernitzauer (USA)	550
Army pistol
1st place, gold medalist(s)	Naghezda Yulina (URS)	570
2nd place, silver medalist(s)	Gail Liberty (USA)	570
3rd place, bronze medalist(s)	Sofia Tyagny (URS)	569

== Shotgun events ==
=== Men ===
Individual			Teams		
Trap
1st place, gold medalist(s)	Vladimir Zimenko (URS)	295	1st place, gold medalist(s)	Soviet Union	777
2nd place, silver medalist(s)	Karni Singh (IND)	295	2nd place, silver medalist(s)	East Germany	768
3rd place, bronze medalist(s)	Joachim Marscheider (GDR)	294	3rd place, bronze medalist(s)	Egypt	767
Skeet
1st place, gold medalist(s)	Nikolay Durnev (URS)	200	1st place, gold medalist(s)	United States	394
2nd place, silver medalist(s)	Yury Tsuranov (URS)	198	2nd place, silver medalist(s)	Soviet Union	392
3rd place, bronze medalist(s)	Thomas Heffron (USA)	197	3rd place, bronze medalist(s)	Sweden	386

=== Women ===
Individual
Trap
1st place, gold medalist(s)	Valentina Gerasina (URS)	87
2nd place, silver medalist(s)	Charlotte Berkenkamp (USA)	86
3rd place, bronze medalist(s)	Sheila Breckon (GBR)	81
Skeet
1st place, gold medalist(s)	Mercedes Mata (VEN)	99
2nd place, silver medalist(s)	Marjorie Annan (USA)	85
3rd place, bronze medalist(s)	Yelena Sebasova (URS)	84

== Running target events ==
Individual			Teams		
100 metre running deer, single shot
1st place, gold medalist(s)	Oleg Zakurenov (URS)	229	1st place, gold medalist(s)	Soviet Union	879
2nd place, silver medalist(s)	John Foster (USA)	228	2nd place, silver medalist(s)	United States	867
3rd place, bronze medalist(s)	Rune Flodmann (SWE)	227	3rd place, bronze medalist(s)	Sweden	842
100 metre running deer, double shot
1st place, gold medalist(s)	Oleg Zakurenov (URS)	223	1st place, gold medalist(s)	Soviet Union	880
2nd place, silver medalist(s)	Iogan (Jogan) Nikitin (URS)	223	2nd place, silver medalist(s)	United States	859
3rd place, bronze medalist(s)	Willis Powell (USA)	220	3rd place, bronze medalist(s)	Finland	811
