= 1949 ISSF World Shooting Championships =

International sport shooting competition

The 34th UIT World Shooting Championships was the contemporary name of the ISSF World Shooting Championships held in Buenos Aires, Argentina, in 1949.

== Medal count ==
| Rank | Country | Gold | Silver | Bronze | Total |
|---|---|---|---|---|---|
| 1 | Finland | 7 | 7 | 3 | 17 |
| 2 | Norway | 5 | 4 | 5 | 14 |
| 3 | Argentina | 5 | 0 | 2 | 7 |
| 4 | Switzerland | 4 | 4 | 5 | 13 |
| 5 | United States | 4 | 4 | 3 | 11 |
| 6 | Sweden | 3 | 8 | 7 | 18 |
| 7 | Yugoslavia | 0 | 1 | 0 | 1 |
| 8 | Brazil | 0 | 0 | 1 | 1 |
| 8 | Spain | 0 | 0 | 1 | 1 |
| 8 | Uruguay | 0 | 0 | 1 | 1 |

== Rifle events ==
| Individual | | | Team | | |
|---|---|---|---|---|---|
300 m Rifle Three positions
| Gold | Olavi Elo (FIN) | 1118 | Gold | Finland | 5512 |
| Silver | Pauli Aapeli Janhonen (FIN) | 1118 | Silver | Switzerland | 5508 |
| Bronze | Jonas Jonsson (SWE) | 1112 | Bronze | Sweden | 5488 |
300 m Rifle Prone position
| Gold | Otto Horber (SUI) | 388 | No team competition | | |
| Silver | Kurt Johansson (SWE) | 387 | No team competition | | |
| Bronze | Robert Bürchler (SUI) | 386 | No team competition | | |
300 m Rifle Kneeling position
| Gold | Kullervo Leskinen (FIN) | 375 | No team competition | | |
| Silver | Otto Horber (SUI) | 374 | No team competition | | |
| Bronze | Ernst Kramer (SUI) | 374 | No team competition | | |
300 m Rifle Standing position
| Gold | Olavi Elo (FIN) | 364 | No team competition | | |
| Silver | Pauli Aapeli Janhonen (FIN) | 364 | No team competition | | |
| Bronze | Willy Røgeberg (NOR) | 361 | No team competition | | |
300 m Standard Rifle
| Gold | Holger Erben (SWE) | 529 | Gold | Sweden | 2534 |
| Silver | Walther Fröstell (SWE) | 520 | Silver | Yugoslavia | 2491 |
| Bronze | Dias Villela Harvey (BRA) | 518 | Bronze | Switzerland | 2486 |
300 m Army Rifle
| Gold | Pablo Cagnasso (ARG) | 419 | Gold | Sweden | 1616 |
| Silver | Olavi Elo (FIN) | 415 | Silver | Finland | 1605 |
| Bronze | Emil Gruenig (SUI) | 410 | Bronze | Argentina | 1597 |
50+100 m Rifle Prone position
| Gold | Arthur Jackson (USA) | 594 | Gold | Norway | 2960 |
| Silver | Thore Skredegaard (NOR) | 594 | Silver | United States | 2950 |
| Bronze | Halvor Kongsjorden (NOR) | 594 | Bronze | Switzerland | 2933 |
50 m Rifle Three positions
| Gold | Pauli Aapeli Janhonen (FIN) | 1165 | Gold | Finland | 5770 |
| Silver | Arthur Edwin Cook (USA) | 1163 | Silver | Sweden | 5763 |
| Bronze | Erling Asbjørn Kongshaug (NOR) | 1162 | Bronze | Norway | 5755 |
50 m Rifle Prone position
| Gold | Arthur Edwin Cook (USA) | 398 | No team competition | | |
| Silver | Toivo Mjänttäri (FIN) | 398 | No team competition | | |
| Bronze | Uno Berg (SWE) | 398 | No team competition | | |
50 m Rifle Kneeling position
| Gold | Robert Bürchler (SUI) | 393 | No team competition | | |
| Silver | Werner Jakober (SUI) | 390 | No team competition | | |
| Bronze | Olavi Elo (FIN) | 390 | No team competition | | |
50 m Rifle Standing position
| Gold | Pauli Aapeli Janhonen (FIN) | 380 | No team competition | | |
| Silver | Erling Asbjørn Kongshaug (NOR) | 379 | No team competition | | |
| Bronze | Holger Erben (SWE) | 377 | No team competition | | |

== Pistol events ==
| Individual | | | Team | | |
|---|---|---|---|---|---|
50 m Pistol
| Gold | Beat Rhyner (SUI) | 548 | Gold | Argentina | 2627 |
| Silver | Harry Reeves (USA) | 547 | Silver | Sweden | 2621 |
| Bronze | Angel Leon Gonzalo (ESP) | 541 | Bronze | United States | 2616 |
25 m Rapid Fire Pistol
| Gold | Huelet Benner (USA) | 565 | Gold | Argentina | 2219 |
| Silver | Harry Reeves (USA) | 564 | Silver | Finland | 2219 |
| Bronze | Leonard Ravilo (FIN) | 563 | Bronze | United States | 2219 |
25 m Center-Fire Pistol
| Gold | Heinrich Keller (SUI) | 559 | Gold | United States | 2161 |
| Silver | Eino Saarnikko (FIN) | 548 | Silver | Switzerland | 2160 |
| Bronze | Huelet Benner (USA) | 546 | Bronze | Finland | 2156 |

== Shotgun events ==
| Individual | | | Team | | |
|---|---|---|---|---|---|
Trap
| Gold | Fulvio Rocchi (ARG) | 284 | Gold | Argentina | 736 |
| Silver | Klas Kleberg (SWE) | 283 | Silver | Sweden | 736 |
| Bronze | Ivar Borg (SWE) | 281 | Bronze | Uruguay | 716 |

== Running target events ==
| Individual | | | Team | | |
|---|---|---|---|---|---|
100 m Running Deer Double Shot
| Gold | Hans Aasnes (NOR) | 194 | No team competition | | |
| Silver | Per Olof Sköldberg (SWE) | 191 | No team competition | | |
| Bronze | Birger Bühring-Andersen (NOR) | 188 | No team competition | | |
100 m Running Deer Single Shot
| Gold | John Larsen (NOR) | 210 | No team competition | | |
| Silver | Rolf Bergersen (NOR) | 204 | No team competition | | |
| Bronze | Birger Kockgard (SWE) | 203 | No team competition | | |
100 m Running Deer Combined
| Gold | John Larsen (NOR) | 398 | Gold | Norway | 1914 |
| Silver | Rolf Bergersen (NOR) | 398 | Silver | Sweden | 1873 |
| Bronze | Per Olof Sköldberg (SWE) | 389 | Bronze | Argentina | 1536 |
