= 1947 ISSF World Shooting Championships =

International sport shooting competition

The 33rd UIT World Shooting Championships was the contemporary name of the ISSF World Shooting Championships held in Stockholm, Sweden in the summer of 1947. It was the first championship after World War II.

== Medal count ==
Rank	Country	Gold	Silver	Bronze	Total
1	Sweden	12	12	9	33
2	Switzerland	5	4	4	13
3	Norway	5	3	4	12
4	Argentina	3	1	1	5
5	Finland	2	6	6	14
6	Italy	1	0	0	1
7	Egypt	0	1	1	2
7	Greece	0	1	1	2
9	Great Britain	0	0	2	2
10	United States	0	0	1	1

== Rifle events ==
Individual			Team		
300 m Rifle Three positions
Gold	Pauli Aapeli Janhonen (FIN)	1116	Gold	Switzerland	5500
Silver	Robert Buerchler (SUI)	1116	Silver	Finland	5489
Bronze	Otto Horber (SUI)	1111	Bronze	Sweden	5463
300 m Rifle Prone position
Gold	Robert Buerchler (SUI)	392	No team competition		
Silver	Kurt Johansson (SWE)	388	No team competition		
Bronze	Otto Horber (SUI)	388	No team competition		
300 m Rifle Kneeling position
Gold	Walther Fröstell (SWE)	375	No team competition		
Silver	Kurt Johansson (SWE)	375	No team competition		
Bronze	Pauli Aapeli Janhonen (FIN)	374	No team competition		
300 m Rifle Standing position
Gold	Pablo Cagnasso (ARG)	363	No team competition		
Silver	Olavi Elo (FIN)	357	No team competition		
Bronze	Pauli Aapeli Janhonen (FIN)	356	No team competition		
300 m Standard Rifle
Gold	Kurt Johansson (SWE)	527	Gold	Sweden	2580
Silver	Walther Fröstell (SWE)	527	Silver	Switzerland	2576
Bronze	Otto Horber (SUI)	524	Bronze	Argentina	2520
300 m Army Rifle Fast shooting
Gold	Otto Horber (SUI)	216	Gold	Switzerland	845
Silver	Karl Zimmermann (SUI)	215	Silver	Sweden	816
Bronze	Lennart Eriksson (SWE)	215	Bronze	Norway	797
50 and 100 m Rifle Prone position
Gold	Odd Sannes (NOR)	592	Gold	Sweden	2346
Silver	Erland Koch (SWE)	591	Silver	Norway	2345
Bronze	Onni Hynninen (FIN)	590	Bronze	Great Britain	2333
50 m Rifle Prone position
Gold	Willy Røgeberg (NOR)	399	Gold	Sweden	1981
Silver	Jonas Jonsson (SWE)	398	Silver	Finland	1974
Bronze	Kurt Johansson (SWE)	398	Bronze	Norway	1966
50 m Rifle Kneeling position
Gold	Johan Hunæs (NOR)	388	Gold	Switzerland	1920
Silver	Otto Horber (SUI)	388	Silver	Norway	1918
Bronze	Tore Skredegaard (NOR)	387	Bronze	Sweden	1909
50 m Rifle Standing position
Gold	Holger Erben (SWE)	377	Gold	Norway	1847
Silver	Mauritz Amundsen (NOR)	373	Silver	Sweden	1838
Bronze	Erling Asbjørn Kongshaug (NOR)	371	Bronze	Finland	1833

== Pistol events ==
Individual			Team		
50 m Pistol
Gold	Torsten Ullman (SWE)	545	Gold	Argentina	2666
Silver	Oscar Bidegain (ARG)	539	Silver	Sweden	2653
Bronze	Karl Axel Wallen (SWE)	536	Bronze	Switzerland	2631
25 m Rapid Fire Pistol
Gold	Carlos Enrique Diaz Saenz Valiente (ARG)	60 hits (570 points)	Gold	Italy	239 hits
Silver	Constantin Mylonas (GRE)	60 hits (558 points)	Silver	Finland	237 hits
Bronze	Sven Lundquist (SWE)	60 hits (558 points)	Bronze	Greece	236 hits
25 m Center-Fire Pistol
Gold	Torsten Ullman (SWE)	1048	Gold	Finland	4079
Silver	Mauri Kuokka (FIN)	1041	Silver	Sweden	4027
Bronze	N. J. Rodeheffer (USA)	1041	Bronze	Great Britain	3928

== Shotgun events ==
Individual			Team		
Trap
Gold	Hans Liljedahl (SWE)	285	Gold	Sweden	737
Silver	Klas Kleberg (SWE)	276	Silver	Egypt	713
Bronze	Seifullah Ghaleb (EGY)	276	Bronze	Finland	681
Skeet
Gold	G. Kjellin (SWE)	95	No team competition		
Silver	Carl Palmstierna (SWE)	94	No team competition		
Bronze	E. W. Norman (SWE)	93	No team competition		
Bronze	K. Scheel (FIN)	93	No team competition		

== Running target events ==
100 m Running Deer Single shot
Gold	Per Olof Sköldberg (SWE)	203
Silver	Yrjö Miettinen (FIN)	199
Bronze	Thorleif Kockgard (SWE)	198
100 m Running Deer Double shot
Gold	Hans Åsnæs (NOR)	197
Silver	Hans Liljedahl (SWE)	196
Bronze	Thorleif Kockgard (SWE)	194
