= 1966 ISSF World Shooting Championships =

International sport shooting competition

The 39th UIT World Shooting Championships was the contemporary name of the ISSF World Shooting Championships in all ISSF shooting events that were held in Wiesbaden, West Germany in 1966.

== Medal count ==
* Host nation (West Germany)

Rank	Nation	Gold	Silver	Bronze	Total
1	United States (USA)	17	6	6	29
2	Soviet Union (URS)	10	14	9	33
3	Poland (POL)	2	3	4	9
4	Romania (ROU)	1	3	0	4
5	Switzerland (SUI)	1	2	1	4
5	West Germany (FRG)*	1	2	1	4
7	East Germany (GDR)	1	1	5	7
8	Sweden (SWE)	1	0	2	3
9	Chile (CHI)	1	0	0	1
10	Czechoslovakia (TCH)	0	1	2	3
11	Bulgaria (BUL)	0	1	0	1
11	Norway (NOR)	0	1	0	1
11	Venezuela (VEN)	0	1	0	1
14	Hungary (HUN)	0	0	2	2
15	France (FRA)	0	0	1	1
15	Great Britain (GBR)	0	0	1	1
15	South Africa (SAF)	0	0	1	1
Totals (17 entries)		35	35	35	105

== Rifle events ==
=== Men ===
Individual			Teams		
300 metre rifle three positions
1st place, gold medalist(s)	Gary Anderson (USA)	1156	1st place, gold medalist(s)	United States	4602
2nd place, silver medalist(s)	Alexander Gerasimenok (URS)	1154	2nd place, silver medalist(s)	Soviet Union	4573
3rd place, bronze medalist(s)	John Foster (USA)	1153	3rd place, bronze medalist(s)	Switzerland	4535
300 metre rifle prone
1st place, gold medalist(s)	Kurt Johansson (SWE)	398	No championship		
2nd place, silver medalist(s)	Magne Landroe (NOR)	398	No championship		
3rd place, bronze medalist(s)	Marat Niyazov (URS)	397	No championship		
300 metre rifle kneeling
1st place, gold medalist(s)	John Foster (USA)	391	No championship		
2nd place, silver medalist(s)	Alexander Gerasimenok (URS)	389	No championship		
3rd place, bronze medalist(s)	Kurt Johansson (SWE)	388	No championship		
300 metre rifle standing
1st place, gold medalist(s)	Kurt Müller (SUI)	375	No championship		
2nd place, silver medalist(s)	Gary Anderson (USA)	375	No championship		
3rd place, bronze medalist(s)	Alexander Gerasimenok (URS)	370	No championship		
300 metre standard rifle
1st place, gold medalist(s)	Ludwig Lustberg (URS)	558	1st place, gold medalist(s)	Soviet Union	2185
2nd place, silver medalist(s)	Vladimir Konyakhin (URS)	552	2nd place, silver medalist(s)	Switzerland	2168
3rd place, bronze medalist(s)	Gary Anderson (USA)	550	3rd place, bronze medalist(s)	United States	2161
50 metre rifle three positions
1st place, gold medalist(s)	Gary Anderson (USA)	1155	1st place, gold medalist(s)	United States	4589
2nd place, silver medalist(s)	Marat Niyazov (URS)	1150	2nd place, silver medalist(s)	Soviet Union	4572
3rd place, bronze medalist(s)	Henryk Górski (POL)	1148	3rd place, bronze medalist(s)	East Germany	4555
50 metre rifle prone
1st place, gold medalist(s)	David Boyd (USA)	598	1st place, gold medalist(s)	United States	2376
2nd place, silver medalist(s)	Jerzy Nowicki (POL)	596	2nd place, silver medalist(s)	Poland	2371
3rd place, bronze medalist(s)	Bill Krilling (USA)	596	3rd place, bronze medalist(s)	Soviet Union	2364
50 metre rifle kneeling
1st place, gold medalist(s)	Vladimir Konyakhin (URS)	390	1st place, gold medalist(s)	United States	1542
2nd place, silver medalist(s)	Marat Niyazov (URS)	389	2nd place, silver medalist(s)	Soviet Union	1542
3rd place, bronze medalist(s)	Michael Victor (RSA)	389	3rd place, bronze medalist(s)	Poland	1537
50 metre rifle standing
1st place, gold medalist(s)	Gary Anderson (USA)	372	1st place, gold medalist(s)	East Germany	1467
2nd place, silver medalist(s)	Werner Lippoldt (GDR)	371	2nd place, silver medalist(s)	Soviet Union	1464
3rd place, bronze medalist(s)	Hartmut Sommer (GDR)	370	3rd place, bronze medalist(s)	United States	1460
50 metre standard rifle
1st place, gold medalist(s)	Donald Adams (USA)	567	1st place, gold medalist(s)	United States	2243
2nd place, silver medalist(s)	Gary Anderson (USA)	565	2nd place, silver medalist(s)	Soviet Union	2215
3rd place, bronze medalist(s)	Hartmut Sommer (GDR)	562	3rd place, bronze medalist(s)	East Germany	2215

=== Women ===
Individual			Teams		
50 metre rifle three positions
1st place, gold medalist(s)	Margaret Thompson (USA)	558	No championship		
2nd place, silver medalist(s)	Anneliese Goth (FRG)	545	No championship		
3rd place, bronze medalist(s)	Tatiana Ryabinskaya (URS)	544	No championship		
50 metre rifle prone
1st place, gold medalist(s)	Eulalia Zakrzewska (POL)	591	1st place, gold medalist(s)	Poland	1747
2nd place, silver medalist(s)	Margaret Thompson (USA)	589	2nd place, silver medalist(s)	United States	1743
3rd place, bronze medalist(s)	Ferenene Kun (HUN)	585	3rd place, bronze medalist(s)	Hungary	1732

== Pistol events ==
=== Men ===
Individual			Teams		
50 metre pistol
1st place, gold medalist(s)	Vladimir Stolypin (URS)	556	1st place, gold medalist(s)	Soviet Union	2203
2nd place, silver medalist(s)	Dentcho Todorov Denev (BUL)	555	2nd place, silver medalist(s)	Switzerland	2186
3rd place, bronze medalist(s)	Hynek Hromada (TCH)	553	3rd place, bronze medalist(s)	Poland	2183
25 metre rapid fire pistol
1st place, gold medalist(s)	Virgil Atanasiu (ROU)	596	1st place, gold medalist(s)	Soviet Union	2354
2nd place, silver medalist(s)	Józef Zapędzki (POL)	594	2nd place, silver medalist(s)	Romania	2354
3rd place, bronze medalist(s)	Renart Suleimanov (URS)	593	3rd place, bronze medalist(s)	East Germany	2346
25 metre center-fire pistol
1st place, gold medalist(s)	William Blankenship (USA)	595	1st place, gold medalist(s)	United States	2341
2nd place, silver medalist(s)	Lubomír Nácovský (TCH)	589	2nd place, silver medalist(s)	Soviet Union	2340
3rd place, bronze medalist(s)	Renart Suleimanov (URS)	587	3rd place, bronze medalist(s)	Czechoslovakia	2313

=== Women ===
Individual
25 metre pistol
1st place, gold medalist(s)	Nina Raskazova (URS)	582
2nd place, silver medalist(s)	Alexandra Sarina (URS)	581
3rd place, bronze medalist(s)	Susan Swallow (GBR)	575

== Shotgun events ==
=== Men ===
Individual			Teams		
Trap
1st place, gold medalist(s)	Ken Jones (USA)	297	1st place, gold medalist(s)	United States	768
2nd place, silver medalist(s)	Gheorghe Enache (ROU)	292	2nd place, silver medalist(s)	Romania	764
3rd place, bronze medalist(s)	Pavel Senichev (URS)	292	3rd place, bronze medalist(s)	Soviet Union	757
Skeet
1st place, gold medalist(s)	Jorge Jottar (CHI)	197	1st place, gold medalist(s)	United States	383
2nd place, silver medalist(s)	Hans Suppli (FRG)	196	2nd place, silver medalist(s)	Soviet Union	381
3rd place, bronze medalist(s)	Artur Rogowski (POL)	195	3rd place, bronze medalist(s)	West Germany	380

=== Women ===
Individual
Trap
1st place, gold medalist(s)	Elisabeth von Soden (FRG)	95
2nd place, silver medalist(s)	Charlotte Berkenkamp (USA)	90
3rd place, bronze medalist(s)	Valentina Gerasina (URS)	89
Skeet
1st place, gold medalist(s)	Claudia Smirnova (URS)	91
2nd place, silver medalist(s)	Mercedes Garcia (VEN)	88
3rd place, bronze medalist(s)	Michele Valery (FRA)	83

== Running target events ==
Individual			Teams		
50 metre running target
1st place, gold medalist(s)	Vladimir Veselov (URS)	164	1st place, gold medalist(s)	Soviet Union	637
2nd place, silver medalist(s)	Iogan Nikitin (URS)	164	2nd place, silver medalist(s)	United States	604
3rd place, bronze medalist(s)	John Kingeter (USA)	161	3rd place, bronze medalist(s)	Sweden	586
