= 1959 European 300 m Rifle Championships =

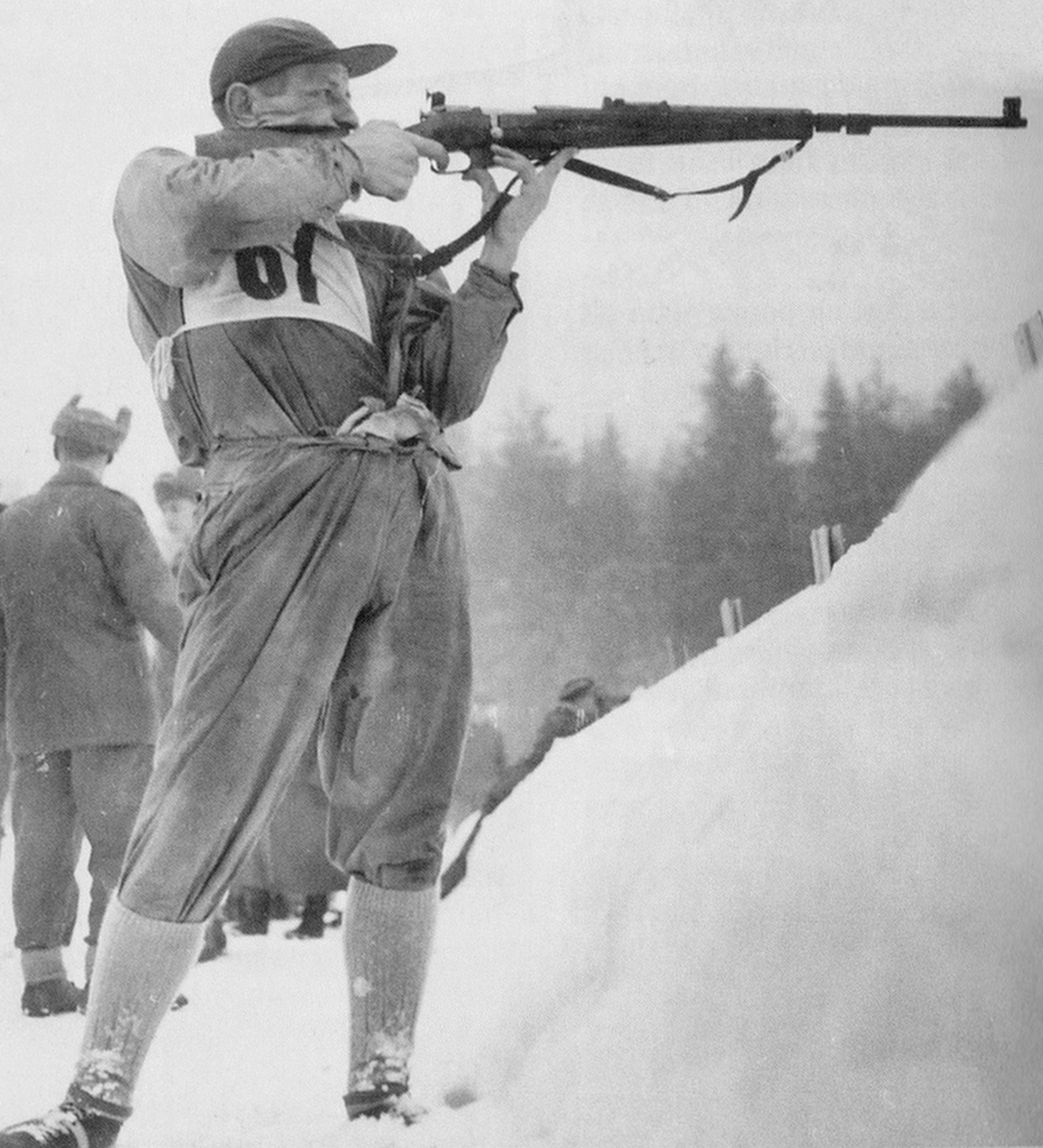
- The Finnish Vilho Ylönen, who won the silver medal in 300 m rifle prone.
- Dates: 25 - 26 August
- Host city: Winterthur, Switzerland
- Level: Senior
- Events: 6 men (5 individual + 1 team)

The 1959 European 300 m Rifle Championships was the 1st edition of the European 300 m Rifle Championships, organised by the International Shooting Sport Federation.

== Results ==
=== Men ===
Event	Gold		Silver		Bronze	
Event	Athletes	Pts	Athletes	Pts	Athletes	Pts
300 m rifle 3 positions	(Soviet Union) Anatoly Bogdanov	1145	(Soviet Union) Moisei Itkis	1141	(Finland) Esa Kervinen	1129
300 m rifle 3 positions, team	Soviet Union; Anatoly Bogdanov; Vasily Borisov; Moisei Itkis; Igor Sasulin		Finland; Pauli Janhonen; Esa Kervinen; Jorma Taitto; Vilho Ylönen		SUI; August Hollenstein; Kurt Müller; Ernst Schmid; Erwin Vogt	
300 m rifle standard	(Soviet Union) Boris Pereberin	542	(Soviet Union) Moisei Itkis	538	(Soviet Union) Anatoly Tilik	537
300 m rifle kneeling	(Soviet Union) Anatoly Bogdanov	384	(Soviet Union) Moisei Itkis	383	(Denmark) Ole Hviid Jensen	379
300 m rifle standing	(Soviet Union) Anatoly Bogdanov	367	(Soviet Union) Moisei Itkis	365	(Finland) Pauli Janhonen	365
300 m rifle prone	(Soviet Union) Anatoly Bogdanov	394	(Finland) Vilho Ylönen	394	(Soviet Union) Moisei Itkis	393

== Medal table ==
Host country

#	Country	1st place, gold medalist(s)	2nd place, silver medalist(s)	3rd place, bronze medalist(s)	Tot.
1	Soviet Union	6	4	2	12
2	Finland	0	2	2	4
3	Switzerland	0	0	1	1
3	Denmark	0	0	1	1
Total		6	6	6	18

== See also ==
- European Shooting Confederation
- International Shooting Sport Federation
- ISSF shooting events
- List of medalists at the European Shooting Championships
- List of medalists at the European Shotgun Championships
