= Switzerland at the 1964 Summer Olympics =

- IOC code: SUI (SWI used at these Games)
- NOC: Swiss Olympic Association

in Tokyo, Japan 10 October 1964 – 24 October 1964
- Competitors: 66 in 13 sports
- Flag bearer: Peter Laeng
- Medals Ranked 22nd: Gold 1 Silver 2 Bronze 1 Total 4

Summer Olympics appearances (overview)
- 1896; 1900; 1904; 1908; 1912; 1920; 1924; 1928; 1932; 1936; 1948; 1952; 1956; 1960; 1964; 1968; 1972; 1976; 1980; 1984; 1988; 1992; 1996; 2000; 2004; 2008; 2012; 2016; 2020; 2024

Other related appearances
- 1906 Intercalated Games

Switzerland competed at the 1964 Summer Olympics in Tokyo, Japan. 66 competitors, 65 men and 1 woman, took part in 51 events in 13 sports.

== Medalists ==
=== Gold ===
- Henri Chammartin – Equestrian, Dressage Individual Competition

=== Silver ===
- Henri Chammartin, Gustav Fischer and Marianne Gossweiler – Equestrian, Dressage Team Competition
- Eric Hänni – Judo, Men's Lightweight (68 kg)

=== Bronze ===
- Gottfried Kottmann – Rowing, Men's Single Sculls

== Cycling ==
Five cyclists represented Switzerland in 1964.

Individual road race

- Hans Lüthi
- Erwin Jaisli
- Louis Pfenninger
- Hans Heinemann

Team time trial

- Erwin Jaisli
- Hans Lüthi
- Louis Pfenninger
- René Rutschmann

== Fencing ==
Five fencers, all men, represented Switzerland in 1964.

Men's épée

- Walter Bar
- Michel Steininger
- Claudio Polledri

Men's team épée

- Claudio Polledri, Paul Meister, Walter Bar, Jean Gontier, Michel Steininger

== Shooting ==
Eight shooters represented Switzerland in 1964.

25 m pistol

- Hans Albrecht
- Hansruedi Schneider

50 m pistol

- Ludwig Hemauer
- Ernst Stoll

300 m rifle, three positions

- August Hollenstein
- Kurt Müller

50 m rifle, three positions

- Kurt Müller
- Erwin Vogt

50 m rifle, prone

- Erwin Vogt
- Hans Simonet

== Swimming ==
Men

Athlete	Event	Heat		Semifinal		Final	
Athlete	Event	Time	Rank	Time	Rank	Time	Rank
Pano Capéronis	100 m freestyle	58.9	56	Did not advance			
Pano Capéronis	400 m freestyle	4:43.8	41	—N/a		Did not advance	
Pano Capéronis	1500 m freestyle	19:10.5	30	—N/a		Did not advance	
Rudolf Brack	200 m breaststroke	2:46.0	26	Did not advance			
