= 1952 ISSF World Shooting Championships =

International sport shooting competition

The 35th UIT World Shooting Championships was the contemporary name of the ISSF World Shooting Championships in all ISSF shooting events held in Oslo, Norway, in 1952, only weeks before the 1952 Summer Olympics. It was the only World Shooting Championship between 1912 and 2008 to be conducted in an Olympic year.

== Medal count ==
Rank	Country	Gold	Silver	Bronze	Total
1	United States	8	3	7	18
2	Switzerland	7	6	4	17
3	Norway	6	4	4	14
4	Sweden	5	8	6	19
5	Finland	3	5	4	12
6	Argentina	1	0	2	3
7	Canada	0	1	0	1
7	Denmark	0	1	0	1
7	Egypt	0	1	0	1
7	Romania	0	1	0	1
11	Germany	0	0	1	1
11	Italy	0	0	1	1
11	Mexico	0	0	1	1

== Rifle events ==
Individual			Team		
300 m Rifle Three positions
Gold	August Hollenstein (SUI)	1123	Gold	Switzerland	5540
Silver	Jorma Taitto (FIN)	1121	Silver	Sweden	5489
Bronze	Robert Buerchler (SUI)	1121	Bronze	Finland	5481
300 m Rifle Prone position
Gold	Kullervo Leskinen (FIN)	392	No team competition		
Silver	Jorma Taitto (FIN)	391	No team competition		
Bronze	Robert Buerchler (SUI)	389	No team competition		
300 m Rifle Kneeling position
Gold	Vilho Ylönen (FIN)	381	No team competition		
Silver	Robert Buerchler (SUI)	378	No team competition		
Bronze	Otto Horber (SUI)	378	No team competition		
300 m Rifle Standing position
Gold	Isac Erben (SWE)	361	No team competition		
Silver	August Hollenstein (SUI)	359	No team competition		
Bronze	Jorma Taitto (FIN)	357	No team competition		
300 m Standard Rifle
Gold	August Hollenstein (SUI)	530	Gold	Switzerland	2601
Silver	Walther Fröstell (SWE)	528	Silver	Sweden	2591
Bronze	Arthur Jackson (USA)	527	Bronze	Norway	2579
50 m Rifle Three positions
Gold	Erling Asbjørn Kongshaug (NOR)	1164	Gold	Switzerland	5781
Silver	Robert Buerchler (SUI)	1162	Silver	Sweden	5737
Bronze	Johan Hunæs (NOR)	1160	Bronze	Norway	5722
50 m Rifle Prone position (60 shots)
Gold	Arthur Jackson (USA)	596	Gold	United States	2364
Silver	Verle Franklin Wright Jr. (USA)	595	Silver	Norway	2360
Bronze	Sven Dessle (SWE)	594	Bronze	Germany	2349
50 m Rifle Prone position (40 shots)
Gold	Arthur Jackson (USA)	400	Gold	Switzerland	1984
Silver	Uffe Schultz Larsen (DEN)	399	Silver	Norway	1979
Bronze	Arthur Edwin Cook (USA)	398	Bronze	United States	1979
50 m Rifle Kneeling position
Gold	Sven Halinoja (FIN)	393	Gold	Sweden	1937
Silver	Johan Hunæs (NOR)	392	Silver	Switzerland	1934
Bronze	Emmett Swanson (USA)	392	Bronze	Norway	1927
50 m Rifle Standing position
Gold	Erling Asbjørn Kongshaug (NOR)	382	Gold	Switzerland	1873
Silver	Max Lenz (SUI)	378	Silver	Finland	1836
Bronze	August Hollenstein (SUI)	378	Bronze	Sweden	1835

== Pistol events ==
Individual			Team		
50 m Pistol
Gold	Torsten Ullman (SWE)	558	Gold	Sweden	2718
Silver	Åke Lindblom (SWE)	555	Silver	Switzerland	2698
Bronze	Huelet Benner (USA)	555	Bronze	Finland	2671
25 m Rapid Fire Pistol
Gold	Huelet Benner (USA)	582	Gold	United States	2304
Silver	Penait Calcai (ROU)	581	Silver	Finland	2272
Bronze	Carlos Saenz Valiente (ARG)	581	Bronze	Argentina	2264
25 m Center-Fire Pistol
Gold	Harry Reeves (USA)	579	Gold	United States	2304
Silver	Walter Walsh (USA)	576	Silver	Sweden	2234
Bronze	Huelet Benner (USA)	576	Bronze	Mexico	2207

== Shotgun events ==
Individual			Team		
Trap
Gold	Pablo Grossi (ARG)	287	Gold	Sweden	754
Silver	George Genereux (CAN)	286	Silver	Egypt	746
Bronze	Knut Holmqvist (SWE)	286	Bronze	Italy	743
Skeet
Gold	C. T. Edwinson (USA)	150	No team competition		
Silver	Cecil Jones (USA)	149	No team competition		
Bronze	Charles Michaelis (USA)	148	No team competition		

== Running target events ==
Individual			Team		
100 m Running Deer Double Shot
Gold	John Larsen (NOR)	206	Gold	Norway	759
Silver	Bengt Austrin (SWE)	201	Silver	Finland	744
Bronze	Karl Bokman (SWE)	195	Bronze	Sweden	722
100 m Running Deer Single Shot
Gold	John Larsen (NOR)	210	Gold	Norway	805
Silver	Rolf Bergersen (NOR)	209	Silver	Sweden	797
Bronze	Karl Bokman (SWE)	209	Bronze	Finland	777
