= Seifollah Ghaleb =

Egyptian sports shooter

Personal information
- Born: 12 May 1916
- Died: 21 December 1984 (aged 68) Cairo, Egypt

Sport
- Sport: Sports shooting
Medal record
World Championships
Silver medal – second place	1947 Stockholm	Team trap
Silver medal – second place	1952 Oslo	Team trap
Bronze medal – third place	1947 Stockholm	Individual trap
Bronze medal – third place	1954 Caracas	Team trap
European Championships
Gold medal – first place	1955 Bucharest	Individual trap
Mediterranean Games
Silver medal – second place	1955 Barcelona	Individual trap

Seifollah Ghaleb (12 May 1916 – 21 December 1984) was an Egyptian sports shooter who competed in the Olympic Trap event from the mid-1940s through the mid-1950s and was the European Champion in 1955. He also won medals at the 1947, 1952, the 1954 World Championships, the 1954 and 1956 European Championships, the 1955 Mediterranean Games, and participated at the 1952 Summer Olympics.

== Biography ==
Ghaleb was a member of the Egyptian Shooting Club and competed in the Olympic Trap event. He earned his first international medals at the 1947 ISSF World Shooting Championships held in Stockholm, Sweden. Individually he won bronze, behind Hans Liljedahl and Klas Kleberg of Sweden, while in the team event he took silver alongside Farid Makarius, Mahmoud Labib, and Sharif Shahine. He won silver again in the team event at the 1952 World Championships in Oslo, Norway, with Shahine, Youssef Fares, and Michel Marabouti. He then participated in the individual trap event at the 1952 Summer Olympics in Helsinki, Finland, where he placed 12th. He made his final podium appearance at the World Championships in 1954, which was held in Caracas, Venezuela, by capturing bronze in the team event with Mohamed Ezzedine Badrawi, Rafie Senoussi, and Aly Riad. He also won a silver medal in the individual trap event at the 1955 Mediterranean Games, held in Barcelona, Spain, behind Italian Galliano Rossini, and was that year's European Champion in Bucharest, Romania. He was also a member of the bronze medal-winning Egyptian trap teams at the 1954 and 1956 editions of the tournament. Domestically, he won individual titles in trap in 1947 and 1951 and skeet in 1949.
