= Carlos Enrique Díaz Sáenz Valiente =

Argentine sport shooter (1917–1956)

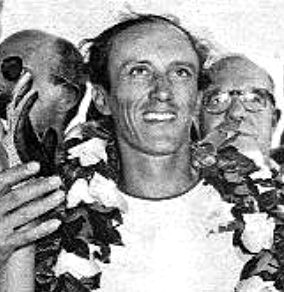
- Díaz Sáenz Valiente in 1955

Personal information
- Born: Carlos Enrique Díaz Sáenz Valiente Bachman; 25 January 1917 Mar del Plata, Argentina
- Died: 14 February 1956 (aged 39) Athos Pampa, Cordoba, Argentina

Sport
- Sport: Sports shooting Motor Racing
Medal record
Men's shooting
Representing Argentina
Olympic Games
Silver medal – second place	1948 London	25 m rapid fire pistol
World Championships
Gold medal – first place	1947 Stockholm	25 m rapid fire pistol
Bronze medal – third place	1952 Oslo	25 m rapid fire pistol
Pan American Games
Gold medal – first place	1955 Mexico	25 m rapid fire pistol

Carlos Enrique Díaz Sáenz Valiente Bachman (25 January 1917 – 14 February 1956) was an Argentine sport shooter and racing driver . He was born in Mar del Plata, Argentina. He won the silver medal in 25 metre rapid fire pistol at the 1948 Summer Olympics in London. He competed at the 1952 Summer Olympics in Helsinki, where he placed fourth. Valiente also won the World Championship in 1947. He won the 1955 Buenos Aires 1000 km sport cars race (co drove José María Ibañez) driving a Ferrari 375 plus. He was killed in a crash involving an airplane he was piloting in 1956.

== See also ==
- 1000 km Buenos Aires
