= Kurt Johansson (sport shooter) =

Swedish sport shooter

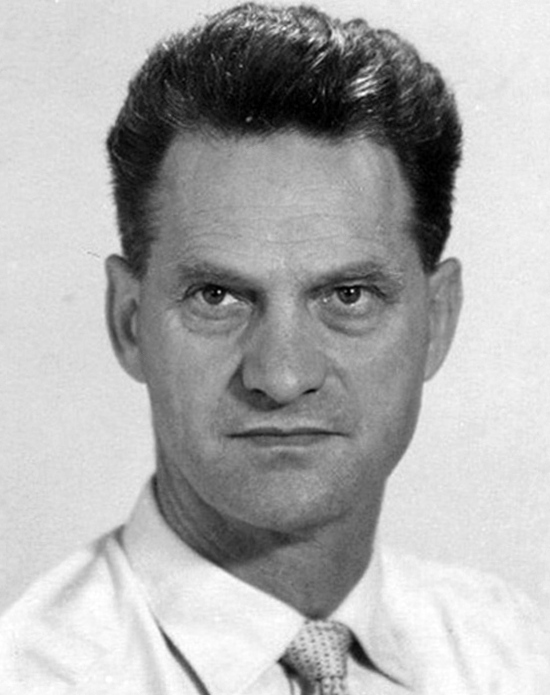
- Kurt Johansson, circa 1960

Personal information
- Born: 25 February 1914 Stockholm, Sweden
- Died: 8 August 2011 (aged 97) Strängnäs, Sweden
- Height: 178 cm (5 ft 10 in)
- Weight: 73 kg (161 lb)

Sport
- Sport: Sports shooting
- Club: Södermalm Liljeholmens Skf
Medal record
Representing Sweden
ISSF World Shooting Championships
Bronze medal – third place	1939 Lucerne	50 m rifle three positions Individual
Gold medal – first place	1947 Stockholm	300 m rifle standard Individual
Gold medal – first place	1947 Stockholm	300 m rifle standard Team
Silver medal – second place	1947 Stockholm	300 m rifle prone Individual
Silver medal – second place	1947 Stockholm	300 m rifle kneeling Individual
Bronze medal – third place	1947 Stockholm	50 m rifle prone Individual
Bronze medal – third place	1947 Stockholm	50 m rifle three positions Team
Gold medal – first place	1949 Buenos Aires	300 m rifle standard Team
Silver medal – second place	1949 Buenos Aires	300 m rifle prone Individual
Silver medal – second place	1949 Buenos Aires	50 m rifle three positions Team
Bronze medal – third place	1949 Buenos Aires	300 m rifle three positions Team
Silver medal – second place	1952 Oslo	300 m rifle standard Team
Silver medal – second place	1952 Oslo	300 m rifle three positions Team
Silver medal – second place	1952 Oslo	50 m rifle three positions Team
Bronze medal – third place	1954 Caracas	50+100 m rifle prone Individual
Bronze medal – third place	1954 Caracas	300 m rifle three positions Team
Gold medal – first place	1962 Cairo	50 m rifle prone Team
Bronze medal – third place	1962 Cairo	300 m rifle prone Individual
Gold medal – first place	1966 Wiesbaden	300 m rifle prone Individual
Bronze medal – third place	1966 Wiesbaden	300 m rifle kneeling Individual

Kurt Ivar Björn Johansson (25 February 1914 – 8 August 2011) was a Swedish shooter who competed at the 1948, 1960 and 1968 Olympics. In 1948 in London he placed fourth in the free rifle, three positions, 300 m event. In 1960 he finished 19th in the same event and 15th in the 50 m rifle prone competition. In 1968 he placed 17th, 20th and 26th in the mixed free rifle, three positions, 300 m, mixed small-bore rifle, three positions, 50 m, and mixed small-bore rifle, prone, 50 m, respectively.

Johansson was born in Stockholm and competed out of Södermalm Liljeholmens Skf. He was a successful international competitor outside of the Olympic Games and gained a reputation at the 1947 ISSF World Shooting Championships in his native Stockholm. There he captured individual silver in the 300 m prone and kneeling positions, gold in the 300 m standard position, and bronze in the 50 m prone position, as well as team gold in the 300 m standard position and bronze in the 300 m rifle three position competition. Prior to World War II he had won bronze in the 50 m rifle three positions tournament at the 1939 World Championships. At the 1949 edition he won individual silver in the 300 m prone position in addition to team gold in the 300 m standard rifle, silver in the 50 m rifle three positions tournament, and bronze in the 300 m rifle three position event. In 1952 he earned team silver medals in the 300 m standard and three position competitions, as well as the 50 three position event. He captured only two medals, an individual silver in the 50+100 m prone and a team bronze in the 300 m three positions tournament, in 1954, prior to breaking from the international scene.

Following his experiences at the 1960 Summer Olympics, Johansson captured individual bronze in the 300 m rifle prone and team gold in the 50 m rifle prone competitions at the 1962 ISSF World Shooting Championships. In 1966 he took his final individual gold medals — gold in the 300 m rifle prone and bronze in the 300 m rifle kneeling — and was awarded the Svenska Dagbladet Gold Medal for his sporting achievements that year, most notably being the oldest-ever ISSF World Championship gold medalist at the time. He died on 8 August 2011, at the age of 97, in Strängnäs, Sweden.
