= Shooting at the 1948 Summer Olympics =

Shooting at the Games of the XIV Olympiad
- Venue: Bisley Rifle Range
- Dates: 2–6 August 1948
- Competitors: 188 from 28 nations

The shooting at the 1948 Summer Olympics in London consisted of four events. The competitions were held from 2 to 6 August 1948.

== Medal summary ==
Event	Gold	Silver	Bronze
rapid fire pistol	Károly Takács; Hungary	Carlos Enrique Díaz Sáenz Valiente; Argentina	Sven Lundquist; Sweden
pistol	Edwin Vásquez; Peru	Rudolf Schnyder; Switzerland	Torsten Ullman; Sweden
300 metre rifle three positions	Emil Grünig; Switzerland	Pauli Janhonen; Finland	Willy Røgeberg; Norway
rifle prone	Art Cook; United States	Walter Tomsen; United States	Jonas Jonsson; Sweden

== Participating nations ==
A total of 188 shooters from 28 nations competed at the London Games:

- Argentina (12)
- Australia (6)
- Austria (3)
- Belgium (3)
- Brazil (7)
- Chile (4)
- Cuba (7)
- Denmark (7)
- Finland (12)
- France (12)
- Great Britain (12)
- Greece (7)
- Hungary (4)
- Iran (3)
- Italy (6)
- Lebanon (2)
- Mexico (9)
- Monaco (4)
- Netherlands (4)
- Norway (8)
- Peru (9)
- Philippines (3)
- Portugal (5)
- Puerto Rico (2)
- Spain (6)
- Sweden (11)
- Switzerland (7)
- United States (12)

== Medal count ==
Rank	Nation	Gold	Silver	Bronze	Total
1	Switzerland	1	1	0	2
1	United States	1	1	0	2
3	Hungary	1	0	0	1
3	Peru	1	0	0	1
5	Argentina	0	1	0	1
5	Finland	0	1	0	1
7	Sweden	0	0	3	3
8	Norway	0	0	1	1
Totals (8 entries)		4	4	4	12
