= Huelet Benner =

American sport shooter

Personal information
- Born: November 1, 1917 Paragould, Arkansas, United States
- Died: December 12, 1999 (aged 82) Tampa, Florida, United States

Sport
- Sport: Sports shooting
Medal record
Men's shooting
Representing the United States
Olympic Games
Gold medal – first place	1952 Helsinki	50 metre pistol
World Championships
Gold medal – first place	1949 Buenos Aires	25 m rapid fire pistol
Gold medal – first place	1952 Oslo	25 m rapid fire pistol
Gold medal – first place	1954 Caracas	50 m pistol
Silver medal – second place	1954 Caracas	25 m center-fire pistol
Bronze medal – third place	1949 Buenos Aires	25 m center-fire pistol
Bronze medal – third place	1952 Oslo	50 m pistol
Bronze medal – third place	1952 Oslo	25 m center-fire pistol

Sergeant Major Huelet Leo "Joe" Benner (November 1, 1917 – December 12, 1999) was an American multi-discipline pistol shooter during what many consider the golden era of international and national competition (post-World War II through the mid-1960s). He was a member of three U.S. Olympic teams (1948, 1952, and 1956).

== Career ==
At the 1949 World Championships at Buenos Aires, Argentina, he won the 25 meter Rapid Fire Pistol title. 1952 was particularly a banner year for Benner. In Oslo, Norway in July, he again won the World Championship in the 25 meter Rapid Fire match, setting a new world record in the process. Later that same month, he took Olympic Gold in the 50 metre pistol event (then known as Free Pistol) at Helsinki, Finland.

At the 1954 World Championships in Caracas, Venezuela, he won the 50 meter Free Pistol title, and also took the silver in the 25 meter Rapid Fire Pistol event. He competed in two Pan American Games (1951 and 1955) winning the Rapid Fire Pistol event in 1951 and the Center Fire Pistol event in 1955. Overall, during his 11 years of international competition, Benner won 13 gold, 6 silver, and 6 bronze medals and set two individual and two team world records.

He earned the U.S. Army Distinguished Pistol Badge in 1940, and was retroactively awarded the United States Distinguished International Shooter Badge for his 1949 World Shooting Championships gold medal performance. MSG Benner was All-Army Pistol Champion an astounding 15 times, and NRA National Pistol Champion 6 times. He also served from 1953 to 1963 as the Pistol Coach at the U.S. Military Academy, West Point, New York.

In 1975, Joe Benner testified before the House of Representatives, Subcommittee on Crime regarding firearms legislation.

He is a member of both the U.S. International Shooting Hall of Fame, and the U.S. Army Marksmanship Unit Hall of Fame.
