= Trond Kjøll =

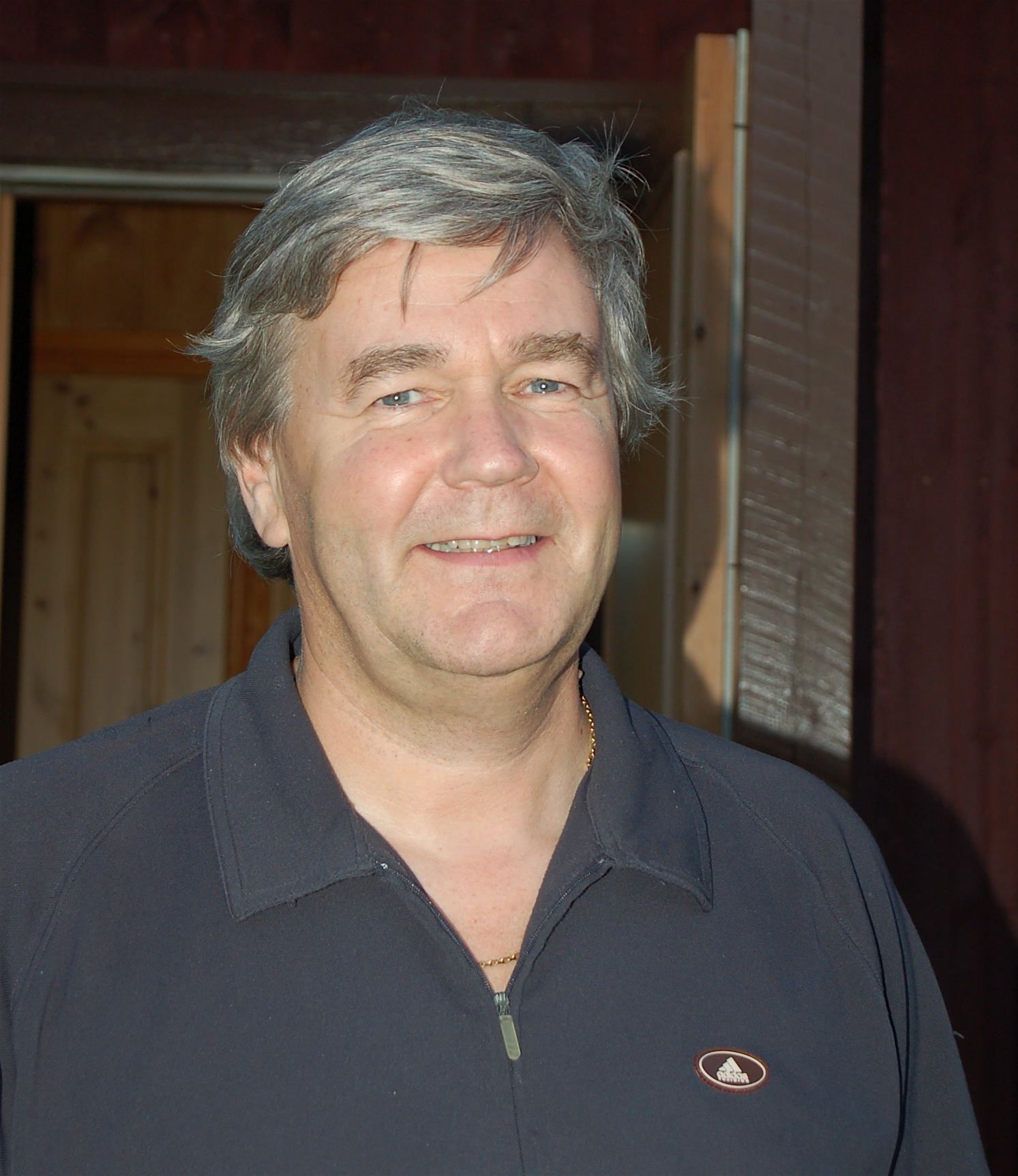
Trond Kjøll

Trond Kjøll (born 13 March 1953 in Modum Municipality, Norway), is a Norwegian rifle shooter and coach. Kjøll set the world record for the 300 m standard rifle in 1995. He became national champion and won the Kings Cup at the National Matches in Lesja Municipality in 1995. Before the 2004 Olympics in Athens he was coach for the Norwegian national team, and he has been shooting coach for the Norwegian national biathlon team several times, most recently from 2004 to 2006.
