= Józef Zapędzki =

Polish sport shooter (1929–2022)

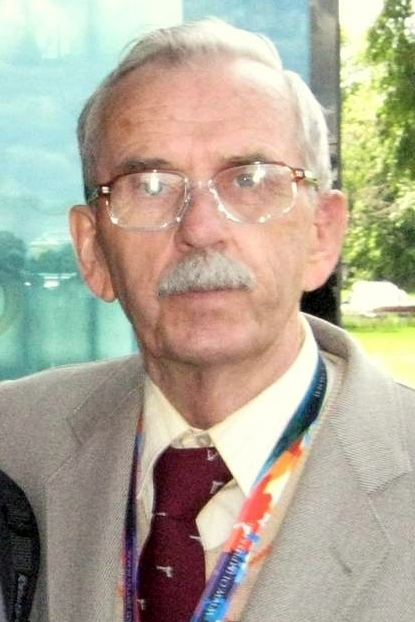
- Zapędzki in 2009

Personal information
- Nationality: Polish
- Born: 11 March 1929 Kazimierówka, Rokitno Szlacheckie, near Zawiercie, Poland
- Died: 15 February 2022 (aged 92) Wrocław, Poland
- Height: 1.74 m (5 ft 9 in)
- Weight: 71 kg (157 lb)

Sport
- Sport: Sport shooting
- Club: Śląsk Wrocław
Medal record
Representing Poland
Olympic Games
Gold medal – first place	1968 Mexico City	25 m rapid fire pistol
Gold medal – first place	1972 Munich	25 m rapid fire pistol
World Championships
Silver medal – second place	1966 Wiesbaden	25 m rapid fire pistol
Bronze medal – third place	1966 Wiesbaden	50 m pistol team
European Championships
Gold medal – first place	1965 Bucharest	25 m centre-fire pistol
Silver medal – second place	1962 Enschede	pistol team
Silver medal – second place	1967 Paris	pistol team
Bronze medal – third place	1971 Suhl	rapid fire pistol
Bronze medal – third place	1972 Belgrade	standard pistol
Bronze medal – third place	1973 Linz	pistol team
Bronze medal – third place	1975 London	pistol team

Józef Zapędzki (11 March 1929 – 15 February 2022) was a Polish sport shooter.

He competed at five consecutive Olympics from 1964 to 1980 in 25 m rapid fire pistol and won two gold medals, in 1968 and 1972. He is one of three shooters to have successfully defended the men's 25 m rapid fire pistol Olympic title. He is a 23-time Polish Champion. Throughout most of his sporting career, he represented the Śląsk Wrocław sports club. Zapędzki died in Wrocław on 15 February 2022, at the age of 92.
