= Halvor Kongsjorden =

Norwegian sport shooter (1911–1990)

Personal information
- Born: 5 November 1911 Veggli in Rollag, Buskerud, Norway
- Died: 15 June 1990 (aged 78) Veggli

Sport
- Sport: Sports shooting
- Club: Oslo Østre Skytterlag
Medal record
Men's shooting
Representing Norway
ISSF World Shooting Championships
Gold medal – first place	1939 Luzern	300 metres free rifle, prone positions
Gold medal – first place	1947 Stockholm	50 m rifle, standing, team
Bronze medal – third place	1935 Rome	300 metres free rifle, prone positions
Bronze medal – third place	1949 Buenos Aires	50 + 100 m rifle, prone positions
Bronze medal – third place	1952 Oslo	50 m rifle, three positions, team

Halvor Kongsjorden (5 November 1911 – 15 June 1990) was a Norwegian sport shooter, World Champion from 1939 and 1947, Olympic competitor from 1948, and a resistance member during the occupation of Norway by Nazi Germany in World War II.

== Sports career ==
Kongsjorden was born in Veggli in Buskerud, and was affiliated with the club Oslo Østre Skytterlag. He achieved a bronze medal in the 1935 World Championships, and became individual World Champion in free rifle in 1939, winning the ISSF World Shooting Championships in Luzern. He was team World Champion from 1947 and 1949. He competed at the 1948 Summer Olympics in London, placing fourth in the 50 metre rifle prone, and 7th in the 300 metre rifle three positions. In 1949 he also won a World Championships bronze medal. He was five times individual Norwegian Champion between 1937 and 1951.

== World War II ==
Towards the end of World War II he was one of the local Milorg leaders in Buskerud (second-in-command in the D16 north district 1612, and leader of the Veggli-Rollag group). Living in the village Veggli in Rollag, his home district became part of the anti-demolition operation Sunshine from 1944 to 1945. His Veggli/Rollag group consisted of around 100 troops, and was, along with other groups, prepared to prevent attempts of demolition by Germans of the Nore1 Power Station. The Nore1 Power Station was then the largest power station in Norway.

He died in Veggli in 1990.
