= Onni Hynninen =

Finnish sports shooter

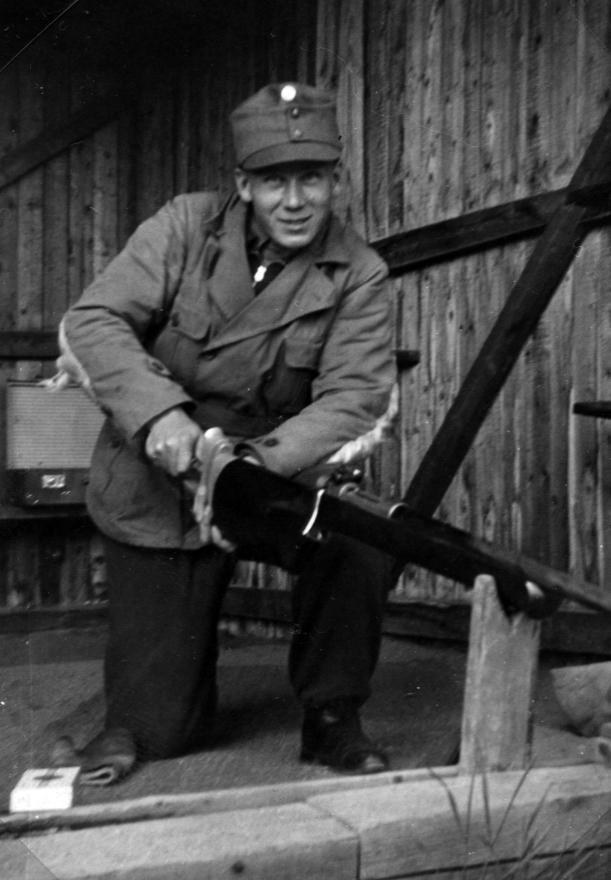
- Hynninen in 1938

Personal information
- Full name: Olavi Onni Albin Hynninen
- Born: 27 November 1910 Kirkkoranta, Grand Duchy of Finland
- Died: 24 June 2001 (aged 90) Valkeakoski, Finland
Medal record
Men's shooting
Representing Finland
World Championships
Bronze medal – third place	1947 Stockholm	50 and 100 m rifle prone
Silver medal – second place	1947 Stockholm	50 m rifle prone, team
Bronze medal – third place	1947 Stockholm	50 m rifle standing, team
Silver medal – second place	1947 Stockholm	300 m rifle 3-pos., team

Olavi Onni Albin Hynninen (27 November 1910 – 24 June 2001) was a Finnish sports shooter. He competed in the 50 m rifle event at the 1948 Summer Olympics. Hynninen also competed in the World Shooting Championships in 1937, 1939, 1947 and 1954.
