= Erling Kongshaug =

Norwegian sport shooter (1915–1993)

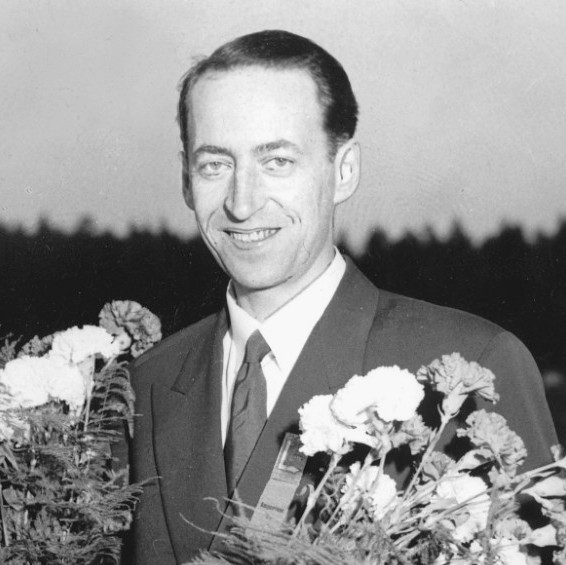
- Erling Kongshaug in 1952

Personal information
- Born: 22 March 1915 Oslo, Norway
- Died: 14 September 1993 (aged 78) Bærum, Norway

Sport
- Sport: Sports shooting
Medal record
Representing Norway
Olympic Games
Gold medal – first place	1952 Helsinki	50 m rifle, three positions
ISSF World Shooting Championships
Gold medal – first place	1947 Stockholm	50 m rifle, standing, team
Bronze medal – third place	1947 Stockholm	50 m rifle, standing
Silver medal – second place	1949 Buenos Aires	50 m rifle, standing
Bronze medal – third place	1949 Buenos Aires	50 m rifle, three positions
Bronze medal – third place	1949 Buenos Aires	50 m rifle, three positions, team
Gold medal – first place	1952 Oslo	50 m rifle, three positions
Gold medal – first place	1952 Oslo	50 m rifle, standing
Bronze medal – third place	1952 Oslo	50 m rifle, three positions, team
Bronze medal – third place	1952 Oslo	50 m rifle, kneeling, team
Silver medal – second place	1954 Caracas	50 m rifle, prone, team
Silver medal – second place	1954 Caracas	50 m rifle, standing, team
Bronze medal – third place	1954 Caracas	50 m rifle, three positions, team
Bronze medal – third place	1954 Caracas	50 m rifle, kneeling, team

Erling Asbjørn Kongshaug (22 March 1915 – 14 September 1993) was a Norwegian rifle shooter. He competed in the 1952, 1956 and 1960 Olympics in 50 meter rifle three positions and 50 meter rifle prone and won a gold medal in the three positions event in 1952. He also won 13 medals at the ISSF World Shooting Championships from 1947 to 1954.
