= Milan Bakeš =

Czech sport shooter (born 1963)

Milan Bakeš (born 26 January 1963 in Chrudim) is a Czech sport shooter. He competed in rifle shooting events in the Summer Olympics in 1992 and 1996.

== Olympic results ==
Event	1992	1996
50 metre rifle three positions (men)	T-21st	T-18th
50 metre rifle prone (men)	T-31st	—
10 metre air rifle (men)	—	8th
