= Pierre-Alain Dufaux =

Swiss sports shooter (born 1949)

Personal information
- Nationality: Swiss
- Born: 2 May 1949 (age 75)

Sport
- Sport: Sports shooting

Pierre-Alain Dufaux (born 2 May 1949) is a Swiss sports shooter. He competed at the 1984 Summer Olympics and the 1988 Summer Olympics.
