= Andrzej Trajda =

Polish sports shooter

Personal information
- Full name: Andrzej Zygmunt Trajda
- Born: 20 November 1942 (age 83) Otwock, Poland
- Height: 180 cm (5 ft 11 in)

Sport
- Sport: Sports shooting

Andrzej Zygmunt Trajda (born 20 November 1942) is a Polish former sport shooter who competed in the 1972 Summer Olympics and in the 1976 Summer Olympics.
