= Anitsa Valkova =

Bulgarian sports shooter

Personal information
- Nationality: Bulgarian
- Born: 12 February 1968 (age 57); Stara Zagora, Bulgaria

Sport
- Sport: Sports shooting

Anitsa Valkova (Bulgarian: Аница Вълкова) (born 12 February 1968) is a Bulgarian sports shooter. She competed in the women's 10 metre air rifle event at the 1992 Summer Olympics.
