= Thorleif Kockgård =

Swedish sports shooter

Personal information
- Born: 19 February 1899 Lidköping, Sweden
- Died: 26 August 1982 (aged 83) Stockholm, Sweden

Sport
- Sport: Sports shooting

Thorleif Kockgård (19 February 1899 – 26 August 1982) was a Swedish sports shooter. He competed in the 100 m running deer event at the 1952 Summer Olympics.
