= Glenn Dubis =

American sport shooter (born 1959)

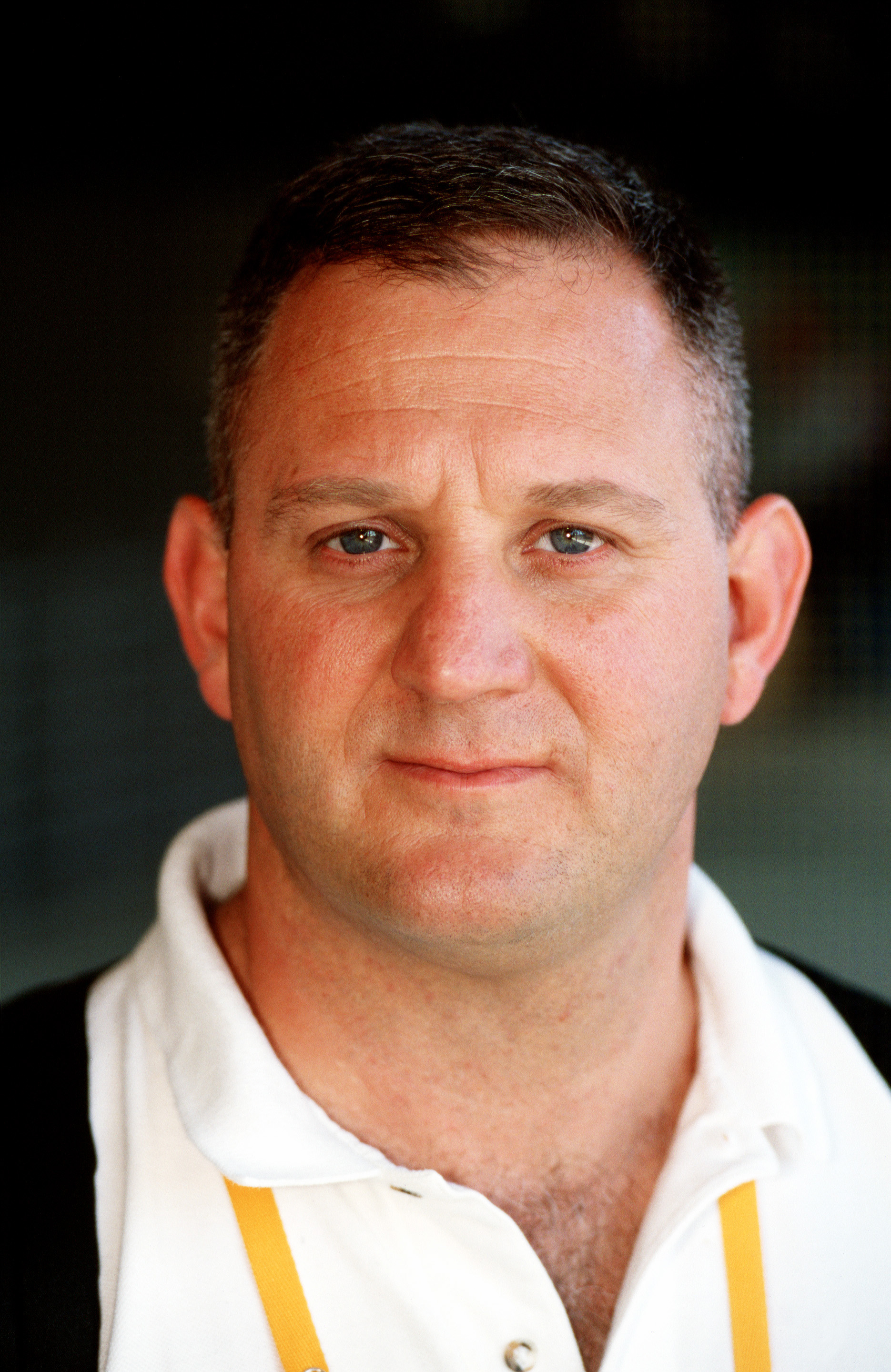
- Dubis in 2000

Personal information
- Born: February 5, 1959 (age 67) Lincoln County, Tennessee, United States

Sport
- Sport: Sport shooting
Medal record
Representing United States
Pan American Games
Gold medal – first place	1987 Indianapolis	50m rifle 3 positions
Gold medal – first place	1987 Indianapolis	50m rifle 3 positions team
Gold medal – first place	1995 Mar del Plata	10m air rifle team
Silver medal – second place	1987 Indianapolis	10m air rifle
Silver medal – second place	1987 Indianapolis	10m air rifle team
Silver medal – second place	1999 Winnipeg	10m air rifle
Bronze medal – third place	1995 Mar del Plata	10m air rifle team

Glenn Alan Dubis (born February 5, 1959) is an American sport shooter. He competed in rifle shooting events at the Summer Olympics in 1984, 1988, 1996, and 2000.

== Olympic results ==
Event	1984	1988	1996	2000
50 metre rifle three positions (men)	6th	5th	T-10th	T-18th
50 metre rifle prone (men)	—	T-15th	—	T-10th
10 metre air rifle (men)	T-15th	—	41st	—
