= Holger Erbén =

Swedish sports shooter (1915–1975)

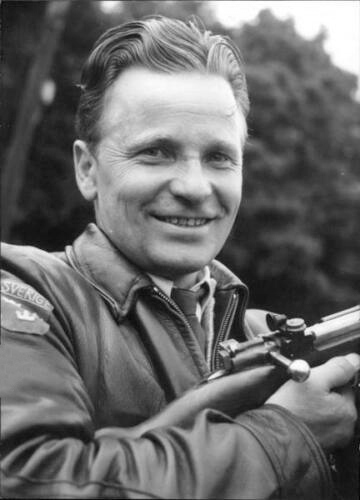
- Erbén in 1954

Personal information
- Born: 15 October 1915 Eskilstuna, Sweden
- Died: 19 August 1975 (aged 59) Örebro, Sweden

Sport
- Sport: Sports shooting
- Club: I3 IF, Örebro
Medal record
Representing Sweden
ISSF World Shooting Championships
Gold medal – first place	1947 Stockholm	50 m rifle standing
Gold medal – first place	1947 Stockholm	300 m rifle team
Gold medal – first place	1949 Buenos Aires	300 m rifle team
Gold medal – first place	1949 Buenos Aires	300 m rifle ind.
Silver medal – second place	1949 Buenos Aires	50 m rifle team
Bronze medal – third place	1949 Buenos Aires	50 m rifle standing
Silver medal – second place	1952 Oslo	300 m rifle team
Silver medal – second place	1952 Oslo	50 m rifle team
Gold medal – first place	1954 Caracas	300 m rifle team
Silver medal – second place	1954 Caracas	50 m rifle team

Isak Holger Erbén (15 October 1915 – 19 August 1975) was a Swedish sports shooter. He competed in the 300 m rifle, three positions, at the 1948 and 1952 Summer Olympics and placed eighth and seventh, respectively.
