= Johan Hunæs =

Norwegian sports shooter

Personal information
- Nationality: Norwegian
- Born: 1911
- Died: 1952 (aged 40–41)

Sport
- Sport: Sports shooting
Medal record
Men's shooting
Representing Norway
ISSF World Shooting Championships
Silver medal – second place	1952 Oslo	50 m Rifle Kneeling position
Bronze medal – third place	1952 Oslo	50 m rifle, three positions

Johan Hunæs (1911 – 1952) was a Norwegian sports shooter.

He won bronze medal in the 50 metre rifle three positions at the World Championships in 1952.
