= Jorma Taitto =

Finnish sports shooter

Personal information
- Born: 5 July 1917 Mäntsälä, Finland
- Died: 6 January 2003 (aged 85) Turku, Finland

Sport
- Sport: Sports shooting

Jorma Taitto (5 July 1917 – 6 January 2003) was a Finnish sports shooter. He competed in three events at the 1956 Summer Olympics.
