= Vladimir Agishev =

Soviet sport shooter

Personal information
- Born: 1 January 1945 (age 81)

Sport
- Sport: Sports shooting

Vladimir Agishev (born 1 January 1945) is a Soviet former sports shooter. He competed in the 50 metre rifle, three positions event at the 1972 Summer Olympics.
