= Aleksandrs Gerasimjonoks =

Soviet sports shooter (1933–2019)

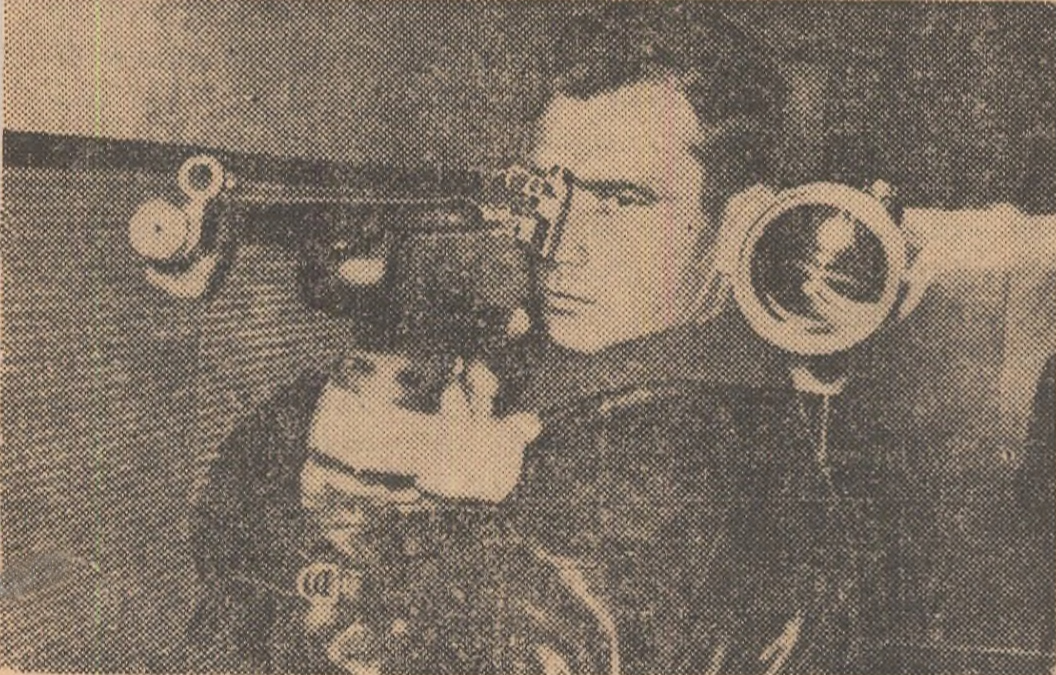

Personal information
- Born: 5 December 1933 Latvia (now Ludzas novads, Latvia)
- Died: 29 August 2019 (aged 85)

Sport
- Sport: Sports shooting

Aleksandrs Gerasimjonoks (5 December 1933 – 29 August 2019) was a Soviet sports shooter. He competed in the 300 metre rifle event at the 1964 Summer Olympics. Gerasimjonoks died on 29 August 2019, at the age of 85.
