= Marat Nyýazow =

Soviet and Turkmen sport shooter (1933–2009)

Personal information
- Full name: Marat Ataýeviç Nyýazow
- Born: 28 September 1933 Ashgabat, Turkmen SSR, Soviet Union
- Died: 8 April 2009 (aged 75) Ashgabat, Turkmenistan
- Height: 1.76 m (5 ft 9 in)
- Weight: 73 kg (161 lb)

Sport
- Sport: Shooting
Medal record
Representing the Soviet Union
Olympic Games
Silver medal – second place	1960 Rome	Rifle three positions
World championships
Gold medal – first place	1958 Moscow	300 m rifle team three positions
Gold medal – first place	1958 Moscow	50 m rifle team three positions
Gold medal – first place	1962 Cairo	50 m rifle team three positions
Silver medal – second place	1958 Moscow	50 m rifle three positions
Silver medal – second place	1962 Cairo	50 m rifle three positions
Silver medal – second place	1966 Wiesbaden	300 m rifle team three positions
Silver medal – second place	1966 Wiesbaden	50 m rifle team three positions
Silver medal – second place	1966 Wiesbaden	50 m rifle three positions
Bronze medal – third place	1966 Wiesbaden	50 m rifle team prone

Marat Ataýewiç Nyýazow (28 September 1933 – 8 April 2009) was a Soviet and Turkmen sport shooter. He won a silver medal at the 1960 Summer Olympics in the 50 metre rifle three positions event and finished in ninth place in the 50 metre rifle prone.

Between 1958 and 1966 he won six gold, 10 silver and three bronze medals at the world championships. He set a world record in 1958 and won a European title in rifle in 1959. Nationally, he won nine titles, in 1957, 1958, 1963, 1964, 1966 and 1968. After retirement he worked as a coach in his native Ashgabat. For his achievements he was awarded the Order of the Red Banner of Labour.
