= Anders Kvissberg =

Swedish sport shooter (1929–2018)

Personal information
- Born: 24 January 1929 Skänninge, Sweden
- Died: 24 April 2018 (aged 89)

Sport
- Sport: Sports shooting

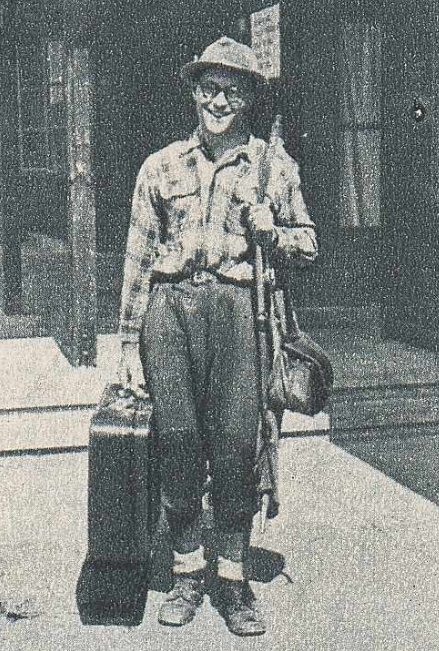
1955

Anders Kvissberg (24 January 1929 – 24 April 2018) was a Swedish sport shooter who competed in the 1956 Summer Olympics and in the 1960 Summer Olympics.
