= Viktor Vlasov (sport shooter) =

Soviet sport shooter

Medal record

Representing the Soviet Union

Men's Shooting

Olympic Games
Gold medal – first place	1980 Moscow	50 m rifle 3 pos

Viktor Alekseevich Vlasov (born 11 June 1951) is a former Soviet sport shooter and Olympic champion.

He received a gold medal in 50 m rifle 3 pos at the 1980 Summer Olympics in Moscow.
