= Henryk Górski =

Polish sport shooter

Personal information
- Born: 4 April 1938 (age 88) Gdynia, Poland

Sport
- Sport: Sports shooting

Henryk Franciszek Górski (born 4 April 1938) is a Polish former sport shooter who competed in the 1960 Summer Olympics and in the 1964 Summer Olympics.
