= Hartmut Sommer =

German sports shooter

Personal information
- Born: 16 September 1934 (age 91) Stendal, Germany

Sport
- Sport: Sports shooting

Hartmut Sommer (born 16 September 1934) is a German former sports shooter. He competed in three events at the 1968 Summer Olympics for East Germany.
