= Tommy Pool =

American sport shooter (1935–1990)

Personal information
- Born: February 10, 1935 Bowie, Texas, United States
- Died: July 7, 1990 (aged 55)

Sport
- Sport: Sports shooting
Medal record
Men's shooting
Representing United States
Olympic Games
Bronze medal – third place	1964 Tokyo	50 m rifle prone

Thomas Gayle Pool (February 10, 1935 – July 7, 1990) was an American sport shooter who competed in the 1964 Summer Olympics.

A multiple times world champion and Olympic medalist, Pool was inducted into the USA Shooting Hall of fame.
