= Harry Wendell Reeves =

American sports shooter

Personal information
- Born: December 3, 1910 Edwardsport, Indiana, United States
- Died: February 5, 2001 (aged 90) Andrews, North Carolina, United States

Sport
- Sport: Sports shooting

Harry Wendell Reeves (December 3, 1910 – February 5, 2001) was an American sports shooter. He competed in the 50 m pistol event at the 1952 Summer Olympics.
