= Gary Anderson (sport shooter) =

American sport shooter

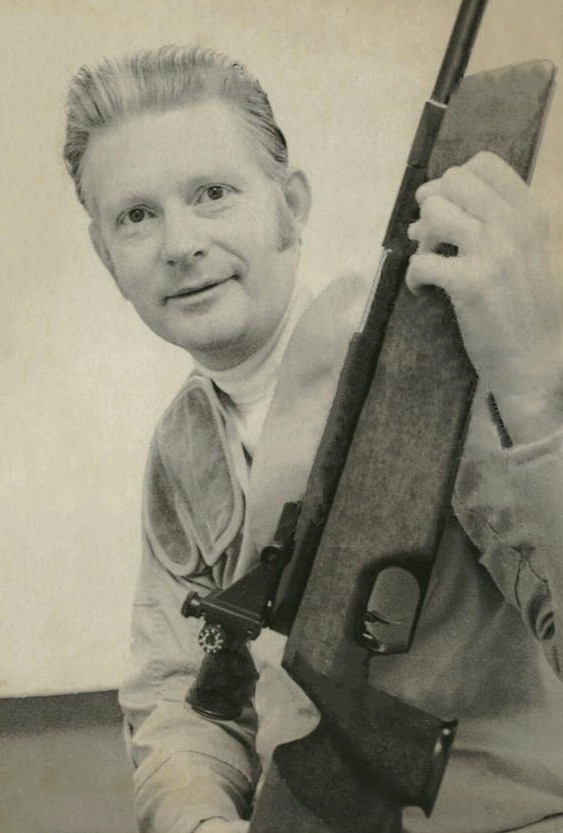
- Gary Anderson in 1976

Member of the Nebraska Legislature from the 37th district
- In office 1973–1977
- Preceded by: Wayne W. Ziebarth
- Succeeded by: Martin F. Kahle

Personal details
- Born: October 8, 1939 (age 87) Holdrege, Nebraska, U.S.
- Party: Republican (former); Democratic (current)
- Spouse: Ruth Ann Anderson (m. 1965)
- Sports career
- Height: 183 cm (6 ft 0 in)
- Weight: 77 kg (170 lb)
- Sport: Rifle shooting
- Club: U.S. Army
Medal record
Representing the United States
Olympic Games
Gold medal – first place	1964 Tokyo	300 m rifle 3 positions
Gold medal – first place	1968 Mexico City	300 m rifle 3 positions

Gary Lee Anderson (born October 8, 1939) is a former Nebraska state legislator and an American sport shooter. He was the only shooter to win two consecutive Olympic gold medals in the 300 m rifle event before it was discontinued. He also set six individual world records, and won seven world and 11 national titles, as well as 11 gold medals at the Pan American Games.

== Early life and education ==
Born in Holdrege, Nebraska, Anderson grew up on a farm near Axtell, Nebraska, and graduated from Axtell High School in 1957. He attended the University of Nebraska for one year and then enlisted in the army. He served in the army until 1962, attaining the rank of Lieutenant. After resigning from the army, Anderson served with the Nebraska Army National Guard from 1963 to 1965 and the California National Guard from 1965 to 1968. During this time he received degrees from Hastings College in Nebraska and the San Francisco Theological Seminary in California.

Gary married Ruth Ann Anderson in Cheyenne, WY, on June 13, 1965. They met while attending Hastings College together.

== Political career ==
Anderson was elected as a Republican to a four-year term in the Nebraska Legislature in 1972. During his term, Anderson felt that the Republican Party was too engaged in partisan politics, so he changed affiliation from the Republican to the Democratic Party. At the end of his term, Anderson did not seek re-election.

== Sport shooting career ==
From a very young age, hunting and shooting fascinated Anderson. Without benefit of a coach or proper equipment (including ammunition), he taught himself how to shoot by dry-firing his rifle for hours at a time. Dreams of becoming an Olympic gold medalist in shooting led Anderson to the United States Army. In 1959, after convincing skeptical army coaches that his implausibly high shooting scores were accurate, he was assigned to the elite United States Army Marksmanship Unit at Fort Benning, Georgia. His first international competition was the Pan American Games in 1959—only two years later, in 1961, he would win his first national championship.

At the 1962 World Shooting Championships in Cairo, Egypt, he stunned the shooting world, then completely dominated by Russian shooters, by winning four individual titles and setting three new world records. At the 1964 Olympics in Tokyo, Japan, Anderson confirmed his performance in Cairo was not a fluke, setting a new world record and winning the 300 meter free-rifle gold medal. At the 1966 World Shooting Championships in Wiesbaden, Germany, he won three additional titles. Anderson continued to demonstrate his dedication to shooting by besting his own world record and winning a second gold medal in the 300 meter free-rifle event at the 1968 Olympics in Mexico City.

In ten years, his two Olympic gold medals, seven World Championship gold medals, six world records, and 12 national titles were and continue to be the most major international shooting titles ever won by an American. Following retirement from active competition, he continued to devote his time and energy to shooting sports by coaching young shooters, teaching shooting clinics, speaking at numerous shooting sports functions, and authoring hundreds of magazine articles and three books about shooting. Even during his "retirement" from shooting competition, Anderson competed in the National Highpower Championships at Camp Perry, Ohio, winning the President's National Trophy in 1973, 1975 and 1976.

Anderson worked at the National Rifle Association of America (NRA) where he served as executive director of General Operations. He was responsible for the development of safety, training and competition programs. Among hundreds of other honors, Anderson was awarded the National Board for the Promotion of Rifle Practice (NBPRP) Distinguished International Shooting Badge (Serial number one) in April 1963 by President John F. Kennedy. While at the NRA, he served on the NBPRP board, and was one of the first people to advocate and pioneer a shift in priorities to youth and junior shooting. As a result of this shift, Anderson became the founding and administrative director of the USA Shooting Team Foundation and, in 1993, he moved to Atlanta to become the Shooting Competitions Manager for the 1996 Olympic Games. In 1996, Anderson accepted a position with Fulton County, Georgia, to manage the Wolf Creek Shooting Venue, a facility destined to become a premier national and international center for the shooting sports.

Anderson's influence on shooting sports extends well beyond the United States. He traveled extensively throughout his career in shooting, serving as a genuine ambassador for shooting sports, attending eleven Summer Olympic Games, three as a competitor and eight as technical delegate or a jury member. He is the first American ever elected to the position of Vice President of the International Shooting Union, and still serves in that capacity today. Anderson is also the recipient of one of only five prestigious honorary memberships to the historic and renowned shooting club, Hauptschutzengesellschaft, in Munich, Germany.

After his active career, Anderson has continued to work with shooting. He was Shooting Competition Manager at the 1996 Summer Olympics in Atlanta, Georgia, and served as Director of Civilian Marksmanship in the U.S. Civilian Marksmanship Program from 1999 to 2009 (now Director Emeritus). He is also one of the vice presidents of the International Shooting Sport Federation.

In June 2012, the International Olympic Committee awarded Anderson the IOC's highest honor, the Olympic Order for outstanding services to the Olympic Movement.

Preceded by Wayne W. Ziebarth	Nebraska state senator – district 37; 1973–1977	Succeeded by Martin F. Kahle
