= Vladimir Chuyan =

Soviet sports shooter

Personal information
- Born: 29 September 1940 Magnitogorsk, Soviet Union
- Died: 28 December 2002 (aged 62) Magnitogorsk, Russia

Sport
- Sport: Sports shooting

Vladimir Chuyan (29 September 1940 – 28 December 2002) was a Soviet sports shooter. He competed in two events at the 1964 Summer Olympics.
