= Mauritz Amundsen =

Norwegian sports shooter (1904–1982)

Personal information
- Born: 4 June 1904 Oslo, Norway
- Died: 8 March 1982 (aged 77) Oslo, Norway

Sport
- Sport: Sports shooting

Mauritz Amundsen (4 June 1904 – 8 March 1982) was a Norwegian Olympic sport shooter, and World Champion from 1931.

He became World Champion in 1931, and team champion in 1947. He competed at three Olympics, in 1936, 1948 and 1952 with 11th place as best result.
