= Hans Simonet =

Swiss sports shooter

Personal information
- Born: 24 June 1935 (age 91)

Sport
- Sport: Sports shooting

Hans Simonet (born 24 June 1935) is a Swiss former sports shooter. He competed in the 50 metre rifle, prone event at the 1964 Summer Olympics.
