= Vladimir Konyakhin =

Soviet sports shooter

Personal information
- Born: 5 August 1943 (age 82) Krasnoyarsk, Soviet Union

Sport
- Sport: Sports shooting

Vladimir Konyakhin (born 5 August 1943) is a Soviet former sports shooter. He competed in the 50 metre rifle three positions event at the 1968 Summer Olympics.
