= Verle Wright Jr. =

American sports shooter

Personal information
- Born: January 19, 1928 Muncie, Indiana, United States
- Died: November 4, 2012 (aged 84)

Sport
- Sport: Sports shooting

Verle Wright Jr. (January 19, 1928 – November 4, 2012) was an American sports shooter. He competed in the 50 metre rifle, three positions and the 50 metre rifle, prone events at the 1956 Summer Olympics.
