= Pablo Cagnasso =

Argentine sport shooter (1908–1988)

Personal information
- Born: 15 February 1908 Buenos Aires, Argentina
- Died: 29 July 1988 (aged 80)

Sport
- Sport: Sports shooting
Medal record
Men's shooting
Representing Argentina
Olympic Games
Pan American Games
Gold medal – first place	1951 Buenos Aires	High Power Rifle

Ing. Pablo Cagnasso Sr. (15 February 1908 – 29 July 1988) was an Argentine civil engineer and sport shooter who was a member of the Argentine Olympic team on several occasions as well as in many World Cups and Pan American Games. He was born in Buenos Aires, Argentina.

Cagnasso was a member of many World and Olympic shooting teams in the 1940s, 1950s, and 1960s. He was always an amateur shooter and served as president, several times, of the Argentine Shooting Federation (FAT), the Argentine Olympic Committee (1973–1977) and his sporting alma mater the Societa Italiana di Tiro a Segno (SITAS), a Buenos Aires-based shooting club. He participated in both Free Pistol and Rifle matches, of several World Cups, Olympic and Pan American Games representing Argentina and winning medals in many of them.

Some of his titles were:

- Gold Medal in 300 metre free rifle standing 40 shots men at Stockholm Sweden 1947.
- Gold Medal in 300 metre army rifle ARG-system men at Buenos Aires Argentina 1949.
- Bronze Medal in 300 metre army rifle ARG-system men team at Buenos Aires Argentina 1949.
