= Walther Fröstell =

Swedish sport shooter

Personal information
- Born: 15 February 1913 Blädinge, Sweden
- Died: 11 February 2010 (aged 96) Stockholm, Sweden

Sport
- Sport: Sports shooting

Walther Fröstell (15 February 1913 – 11 February 2010) was a Swedish sport shooter who competed in the 1948 Summer Olympics, in the 1952 Summer Olympics, and in the 1960 Summer Olympics.
