= Uno Berg =

Swedish sports shooter

Personal information
- Born: 20 February 1909 Borlänge, Sweden
- Died: 29 June 2001 (aged 92) Halmstad, Sweden

Sport
- Sport: Sports shooting

Uno Berg (20 February 1909 – 29 June 2001) was a Swedish sports shooter. He competed at the 1948 Summer Olympics and 1952 Summer Olympics.
