= Thore Skredegaard =

Norwegian sport shooter (1909–2002)

Personal information
- Born: 22 September 1909 Våle Municipality, Norway
- Died: 8 May 2002 (aged 92) Oslo, Norway

Sport
- Sport: Sports shooting

Thore Skredegaard (22 September 1909 – 8 May 2002) was a Norwegian sport shooter. He was born in Våle Municipality. He competed at the 1948 Summer Olympics in London, where he placed fifth in the 50 metre rifle prone.
