= Olavi Elo =

Finnish sports shooter

Personal information
- Born: 5 April 1913 Pori, Finland
- Died: 13 April 1979 (aged 66) Pori, Finland

Sport
- Sport: Sports shooting

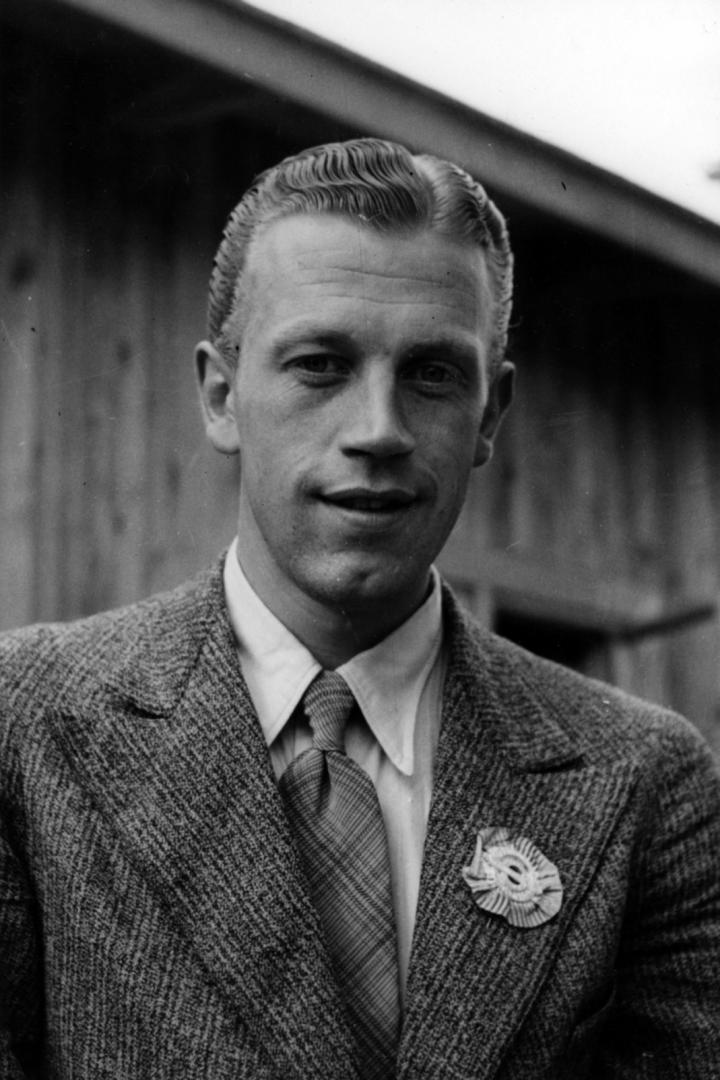
Olavi Elo

Olavi Elo (5 April 1913 – 13 April 1979) was a Finnish sports shooter. He competed at the 1936 Summer Olympics and 1948 Summer Olympics.
