= 300 meter army rifle =

300 meter army rifle is a discontinued ISSF shooting event, that was part of the ISSF World Shooting Championships programme between 1911 and 1962. All competitors were required to shoot this event with the army rifle of the host country.
