= John Foster (sport shooter) =

American sports shooter (born 1936)

Personal information
- Born: September 13, 1936 (age 90) Muskegon, Michigan, U.S.

Sport
- Sport: Sports shooting

John Foster (born September 13, 1936) is an American former sports shooter. He competed at the 1960 Summer Olympics and the 1968 Summer Olympics.
