= Jonas Jonsson (sport shooter) =

Swedish sport shooter

Personal information
- Born: 27 October 1903 Hanebo, Sweden
- Died: 12 January 1996 (aged 92) Norrköping, Sweden

Sport
- Sport: Sports shooting
Medal record
Men's shooting
Representing Sweden
Olympic Games
Bronze medal – third place	1948 London	50 m rifle

Jonas Jonsson (27 October 1903 – 12 January 1996) was a Swedish shooter who competed in the Olympic Games in 1948. He won the bronze medal in London in the 50 metre rifle, prone position category.
