= Robert Bürchler =

Swiss sport shooter (1915–1993)

Personal information
- Born: 28 May 1915
- Died: 23 April 1993 (aged 77)
Medal record
Men's shooting
Representing Switzerland
Olympic Games
| Silver medal – second place | 1952 Helsinki | 300 m free rifle, three positions |

Robert Bürchler (28 May 1915 – 23 April 1993) was a Swiss sport shooter. He won a silver medal in Men's 300 m Rifle, 3 positions at the 1952 Summer Olympics in Helsinki, behind Anatoli Ivanovich Bogdanov and ahead of Lev Vainshtein.
