= Otto Horber =

Swiss sports shooter (1912–2003)

Personal information
- Born: 7 May 1912
- Died: 14 March 2003 (aged 90) Zurich, Switzerland

Sport
- Sport: Sports shooting

Otto Horber (7 May 1912 – 14 March 2003) was a Swiss sports shooter. He competed at the 1948 Summer Olympics and 1952 Summer Olympics.
