= Erwin Vogt =

Swiss sports shooter

Personal information
- Born: 17 September 1931 Lauwil, Switzerland
- Died: 14 September 2022 (aged 90)

Sport
- Sport: Sports shooting

Erwin Vogt (17 September 1931 – 14 September 2022) was a Swiss sports shooter. He competed at the 1964, 1968 and the 1972 Summer Olympics.
