= Kurt Müller (sport shooter) =

Swiss sport shooter

Personal information
- Born: 4 April 1934 (age 92) Kriens, Switzerland

Sport
- Sport: Sport shooting
Medal record
Men's shooting
Representing Switzerland
Olympic Games
Bronze medal – third place	1968 Mexico City	300 m free rifle, three positions

Kurt Müller (born 4 April 1934) is a Swiss sport shooter. He won a bronze medal in the men's 300 m rifle, 3 positions at the 1968 Summer Olympics in Mexico City.
