= Pauli Janhonen =

Finnish sport shooter

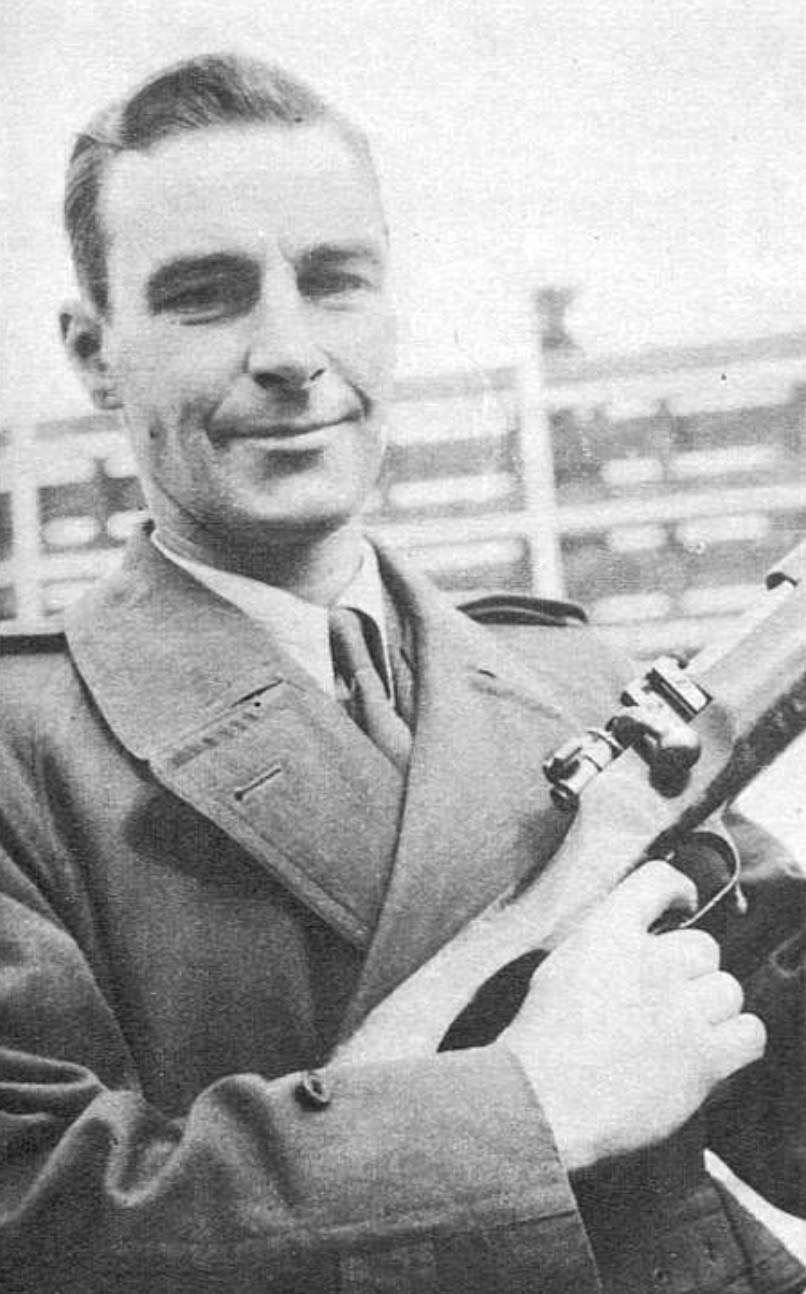

Personal information
- Born: 20 October 1914 Jyväskylä, Finland
- Died: 30 November 2007 (aged 93) Jyväskylä, Finland

Sport
- Sport: Sports shooting
Medal record
Men's shooting
Representing Finland
Olympic Games
Silver medal – second place	1948 London	300 m rifle

Pauli Janhonen (20 October 1914 – 30 November 2007) was a Finnish sport shooter. He was born in Jyväskylä. He won a silver medal in the 300 metre rifle three positions at the 1948 Summer Olympics in London. He also competed at the 1952 Summer Olympics in Helsinki and at the 1960 Summer Olympics in Rome.
