= August Hollenstein =

Swiss sports shooter (1920–2003)

Personal information
- Born: 28 March 1920 Bettwiesen, Switzerland
- Died: 31 October 2003 (aged 83)

Sport
- Sport: Sports shooting

August Hollenstein (28 March 1920 – 31 October 2003) was a Swiss sports shooter. He competed at the 1952 Summer Olympics, 1960 Summer Olympics and 1964 Summer Olympics.
