= Discontinued ISSF shooting events =

This article includes the ISSF World Shooting Championships medal tables of currently discontinued shooting events. The events that International Shooting Sport Federation presently includes in World Championships and Olympic Games are listed in ISSF shooting events article.

== 300 metres free rifle prone 40 shots, men ==
This event was held at World Championships in 1897–1986.

Year	Place	Gold	Silver	Bronze
1897	(France) Lyon	Frank Jullien (SUI)	Enrico Ghisler (ITA)	Ole Oestmo (NOR)
1898	(Italy) Turin	Léon Moreaux (FRA)	Achille Paroche (FRA)	Stefano Tirotti (ITA)
1899	(Netherlands) Loosduinen	Jesse Alfred Wallingford (GBR)	Cesare Valerio (ITA)	Léon Moreaux (FRA)
1900	(France) Paris	Achille Paroche (FRA)	Anders Peter Nielsen (DEN)	Ole Oestmo (NOR)
1901	(Switzerland) Lucerne	Emil Kellenberger (SUI)	Maurice Marie Lecoq (FRA)	Achille Paroche (FRA)
1902	(Italy) Rome	Attilio Conti (ITA)	Daniele Bonicelli (ITA)	Auguste Cavadini (FRA)
1903	(Argentina) Buenos Aires	Louis Richardet (SUI)	Emil Kellenberger (SUI)	Adolf Tobler (SUI)
1904	(France) Lyon	François Rysheuvels (BEL)	Achille Paroche (FRA)	Louis Richardet (SUI)
1905	(Belgium) Brussels	Charles Paumier du Verger (BEL)	Uylke Vuurman (NED)	Eugène Balme (FRA)
1906	(Italy) Milan	Eugène Balme (FRA)	Konrad Stäheli (SUI)	Maurice Marie Lecoq (FRA)
1907	(Switzerland) Zurich	Guillermo Ballmer (ARG)	Eugène Balme (FRA)	Konrad Stäheli (SUI)
1908	(Austria) Vienna	Raffaele Frasca (ITA)	Andre Parmentier (FRA)	Achille Paroche (FRA)
1909	(Germany) Hamburg	Konrad Stäheli (SUI)	Achille Paroche (FRA)	Attilio Conti (ITA)
1910	(Netherlands) Loosduinen	Achille Paroche (FRA)	Jean Reich (SUI)	Charles Paumier du Verger (BEL)
1911	(Italy) Rome	Konrad Stäheli (SUI)	Jakob Bryner (SUI)	Charles Scheirlinckx (BEL)
1912	(France) Bayonne, Biarritz	Konrad Stäheli (SUI)	Paul Rene Colas (FRA)	Husson (FRA)
1913	(United States) Camp Perry	Achille Paroche (FRA)	Konrad Stäheli (SUI)	John Kneubel (USA)
1914	(Denmark) Viborg	Konrad Stäheli (SUI)	Rene Georges (FRA)	Lars Jørgen Madsen (DEN)
1921	(France) Lyon	Walter Raymond Stokes (USA)	James Christian (USA)	Morris Fisher (USA)
1922	(Italy) Milan	Walter Lienhard (SUI)	Walter Raymond Stokes (USA)	Calvin Lloyd (USA)
1923	(United States) Camp Perry	Morris Fisher (USA)	John Keith Boles (USA)	Walter Raymond Stokes (USA)
1924	(France) Reims	Walter Raymond Stokes (USA)	Morris Fisher (USA)	Raymond Orville Coulter (USA)
1925	(Switzerland) St. Gallen	Walter Lienhard (SUI)	Georges Roes (FRA)	Josias Hartmann (SUI)
1927	(Italy) Rome	William Bruce (USA)	Mauritz Eriksson (SWE)	Ivar Wester K. (SWE)
1928	(Netherlands) Loosduinen	Mauritz Eriksson (SWE)	Olle Ericsson I. (SWE)	Reidar Muslie (NOR)
1929	(Sweden) Stockholm	Emrik Karlsson (SWE)	Olle Ericsson I. (SWE)	Josias Hartmann (SUI)
1930	(Belgium) Antwerp	Kullervo Leskinen (FIN)	Sven Oscar Lindgren (FIN)	Fernand Demierre (SUI)
1931	(Poland) Lwów	Sven Oscar Lindgren (FIN)	Kullervo Leskinen (FIN)	Johannes Siir (EST)
1933	(Spain) Granada	Einari Oksa (FIN)	Kullervo Leskinen (FIN)	Bertil Vilhelm Rönnmark (SWE)
1935	(Italy) Rome	Bertil Vilhelm Rönnmark (SWE)	Raymond Durand (FRA)	Halvor Kongsjorden (NOR)
1937	(Finland) Helsinki	Einari Oksa (FIN)	Elmar Kivistik (EST)	Olavi Elo (FIN)
1939	(Switzerland) Lucerne	Halvor Kongsjorden (NOR)	August Liivik (EST)	Evald Christensen (DEN)
1947	(Sweden) Stockholm	Robert Bürchler (SUI)	Kurt Johansson (SWE)	Otto Horber (SUI)
1949	(Argentina) Buenos Aires	Otto Horber (SUI)	Kurt Johansson (SWE)	Robert Bürchler (SUI)
1952	(Norway) Oslo	Kullervo Leskinen (FIN)	Jorma Tuomas Taitto (FIN)	Robert Bürchler (SUI)
1954	(Venezuela) Caracas	Anatoli Bogdanov (URS)	Vasily Borisov (URS)	Ernst Huber (SUI)
1958	(Soviet Union) Moscow	Verle Franklin Jun. Wright (USA)	Vilho Ilmari Ylönenen (FIN)	Daniel Bruce Puckel (USA)
1962	(Egypt) Cairo	Gary Anderson (USA)	Hans Rudolf Spillmann (SUI)	Kurt Johansson (SWE)
1966	(West Germany) Wiesbaden	Kurt Johansson (SWE)	Magne Landro (NOR)	Marat Niyazov (URS)
1970	(United States) Phoenix	Theo Ditzler (SUI)	Lones Wigger (USA)	Jaakko Minkkinen (FIN)
1974	(Switzerland) Thun	Lanny Bassham (USA)	Uto Wunderlich (GDR)	Lones Wigger (USA)
1978	(South Korea) Seoul	Walter Inderbitzin (SUI)	Lones Wigger (USA)	Tore Hartz (NOR)
1986	(Sweden) Skövde	Malcolm Cooper (GBR)	Harald Stenvaag (NOR)	Mauri Roeppaenen (FIN)

== 300 metres free rifle prone 40 shots, men team ==
This event was held at World Championships in 1937–1986.

Year	Place	Gold	Silver	Bronze
1937	(Finland) Helsinki	(Estonia) Estonia; Harald Kivioja; Elmar Kivistik; Gustav Lokotar; Vladimir Kukk; August Liivik	(Finland) Finland; Olavi Elo; Kullervo Leskinen; Viktor Miinalainen; Einari Oksa; Nisse Vasenius	(Sweden) Sweden; Sven Dessle; Kurt Johansson; Olle Ericsson I. Tage Eriksson; Bertil Vilhelm Rönnmark
1970	(United States) Phoenix	(Switzerland) Switzerland; Andreas Beyeler; Erich Burgin; Theo Ditzler; Emile Kohler	(Soviet Union) Soviet Union; Valentin Kornev; Boris Melnik; Vitali Parkhimovitch; Sergei Yermilov	(Finland) Finland; Osmo Ala-Honkola; Esa Einari Kervinen; Juhani Laakso; Jaakko Minkkinen
1974	(Switzerland) Thun	United States; Lanny Bassham; John Robert Foster; Lones Wigger; John Writer	(Soviet Union) Soviet Union; Vladimir Agishev; Valentin Kornev; Gennadi Lushikov; Boris Melnik	(Switzerland) Switzerland; Max Huerzeler; Charles Jermann; Martin Truttmann; Erwin Vogt
1978	(South Korea) Seoul	United States; Ray Carter; David Kimes; Lones Wigger; Webster Wright	(Finland) Finland; Osmo Ala-Honkola; Juhani Laakso; Jaakko Minkkinen; Mauri Roeppaenen	(Switzerland) Switzerland; Kuno Bertschy; Walter Inderbitzin; Charles Jermann; Ueli Sarbach
1986	(Sweden) Skövde	(Soviet Union) Soviet Union; Victor Daniltchenko; Gennadi Lushikov; Alexander Mitrofanov	(Norway) Norway; Geir Skirbekk; Harald Stenvaag; Kare Inge Viken	(Switzerland) Switzerland; Heinz Braem; Pierre-Alain Dufaux; Norbert Sturny

== 300 metre free rifle standing 40 shots, men ==
This event was held at World Championships in 1897–1990.

Year	Place	Gold	Silver	Bronze
1897	(France) Lyon	Ole Oestmo (NOR)	Frank Jullien (SUI)	Henrik Sillem (NED)
1898	(Italy) Turin	Achille Paroche (FRA)	Léon Moreaux (FRA)	Auguste Cavadini (FRA)
1899	(Netherlands) Loosduinen	Franz Boeckli (SUI)	Lars Jørgen Madsen (DEN)	Olaf Emil Frydenlund (NOR)
1900	(France) Paris	Lars Jørgen Madsen (DEN)	Ole Oestmo (NOR)	Charles Paumier du Verger (BEL)
1901	(Switzerland) Lucerne	Cesare Valerio (ITA)	Johann Prem (AUT)	Maxime Lardin (FRA)
1902	(Italy) Rome	Emil Kellenberger (SUI)	Hans Lechner (GER)	Maxime Lardin (FRA)
1903	(Argentina) Buenos Aires	Jose Masso (ARG)	Emil Kellenberger (SUI)	Cesare Valerio (ITA)
1904	(France) Lyon	Daniele Bonicelli (ITA)	Konrad Stäheli (SUI)	Paul Van Asbroeck (BEL)
1905	(Belgium) Brussels	Paul Van Asbroeck (BEL)	Charles Paumier du Verger (BEL)	van Den Branden (BEL)
1906	(Italy) Milan	Albert Courquin (FRA)	Charles Paumier du Verger (BEL)	Paul Van Asbroeck (BEL)
1907	(Switzerland) Zurich	Karl Wertgartner (AUT)	Jean Reich (SUI)	Paul Van Asbroeck (BEL)
1908	(Austria) Vienna	Lars Jørgen Madsen (DEN)	Albert Courquin (FRA)	Paul Van Asbroeck (BEL)
1909	(Germany) Hamburg	Emil Pachmayer (GER)	Andre Parmentier (FRA)	Marcel Meyer de Stadelhofen (SUI)
1910	(Netherlands) Loosduinen	Jean Reich (SUI)	Emil Pachmayer (GER)	Charles Paumier du Verger (BEL)
1911	(Italy) Rome	Konrad Stäheli (SUI)	Lars Jørgen Madsen (DEN)	Jakob Bryner (SUI)
1912	(France) Bayonne, Biarritz	Ricardo Ticchi (ITA)	Paul Van Asbroeck (BEL)	Konrad Stäheli (SUI)
1913	(United States) Camp Perry	Caspar Widmer (SUI)	Konrad Stäheli (SUI)	Albert Courquin (FRA)
1914	(Denmark) Viborg	Rene Georges (FRA)	Konrad Stäheli (SUI)	Gustaf Richard Nyman (FIN)
1921	(France) Lyon	Walter Raymond Stokes (USA)	Josias Hartmann (SUI)	Karl Zimmermann (SUI)
1922	(Italy) Milan	Karl Zimmermann (SUI)	Carl Townsend Osburn (USA)	Lars Jørgen Madsen (DEN)
1923	(United States) Camp Perry	Laurence Adam Nuesslein (USA)	Morris Fisher (USA)	John Keith Boles (USA)
1924	(France) Reims	Karl Zimmermann (SUI)	Walter Raymond Stokes (USA)	Antonio Rico (ARG)
1925	(Switzerland) St. Gallen	Josias Hartmann (SUI)	Walter Lienhard (SUI)	Manning Dodson (USA)
1927	(Italy) Rome	Josias Hartmann (SUI)	Karl Zimmermann (SUI)	Raymond Durand (FRA)
1928	(Netherlands) Loosduinen	Jakob Reich (SUI)	Einari Oksa (FIN)	Olle Ericsson I. (SWE)
1929	(Sweden) Stockholm	Karl Zimmermann (SUI)	Josias Hartmann (SUI)	Russell Seitzinger (USA)
1930	(Belgium) Antwerp	Einari Oksa (FIN)	Josias Hartmann (SUI)	Harry Renshaw (USA)
1931	(Poland) Lwów	Karl Zimmermann (SUI)	Olle Ericsson I. (SWE)	Jakob Reich (SUI)
1933	(Spain) Granada	Karl Zimmermann (SUI)	Olle Ericsson I. (SWE)	Josias Hartmann (SUI)
1935	(Italy) Rome	Sven Dessle (SWE)	August Liivik (EST)	Willy Røgeberg (NOR)
1937	(Finland) Helsinki	Olavi Elo (FIN)	Emil Gruenig (SUI)	Elmar Kivistik (EST)
1939	(Switzerland) Lucerne	Karl Zimmermann (SUI)	Toivo Maenttaeri (FIN)	Emil Gruenig (SUI)
1947	(Sweden) Stockholm	Pablo Cagnasso (ARG)	Olavi Elo (FIN)	Pauli Aapeli Janhonen (FIN)
1949	(Argentina) Buenos Aires	Olavi Elo (FIN)	Pauli Aapeli Janhonen (FIN)	Willy Røgeberg (NOR)
1952	(Norway) Oslo	Isac Holger Erben (SWE)	August Hollenstein (SUI)	Jorma Tuomas Taitto (FIN)
1954	(Venezuela) Caracas	Vasily Borisov (URS)	August Hollenstein (SUI)	Anatoli Bogdanov (URS)
1958	(Soviet Union) Moscow	Constantin Antonescu (ROM)	Vilho Ilmari Ylönenen (FIN)	Hans Werner Harbeck (FRG)
1962	(Egypt) Cairo	Tommy Pool (USA)	Jozsef Lacsny (HUN)	Daniel Bruce Puckel (USA)
1966	(West Germany) Wiesbaden	Kurt Mueller (SUI)	Gary Anderson (USA)	Alexander Gerasimenok (URS)
1970	(United States) Phoenix	Margaret Murdock (USA)	John Robert Foster (USA)	John Writer (USA)
1974	(Switzerland) Thun	Lanny Bassham (USA)	John Robert Foster (USA)	Vladimir Agishev (URS)
1978	(South Korea) Seoul	Malcolm Cooper (GBR)	Robert Cheyne (CAN)	Lones Wigger (USA)
1982	(Venezuela) Caracas	Gennadi Lushikov (URS)	Vladimir Lvov (URS)	Lones Wigger (USA)
1986	(Sweden) Skövde	Malcolm Cooper (GBR)	Glenn Dubis (USA)	Michel Bury (FRA)
1990	(Soviet Union) Moscow	Glenn Dubis (USA)	Roger Jansson (SWE)	Pascal Bessy (FRA)

== 300 metre free rifle standing 40 shots, men team ==
This event was held at World Championships in 1937–1990.

Year	Place	Gold	Silver	Bronze
1937	(Finland) Helsinki	(Estonia) Estonia; Harald Kivioja; Elmar Kivistik; Gustav Lokotar; August Liivik; Alfred Kukk	(Switzerland) Switzerland; Emil Gruenig; Otto Horber; Albert Salzmann; Mario Ciocco; Karl Zimmermann	(Finland) Finland; Olavi Elo; Kullervo Leskinen; Viktor Miinalainen; Einari Oksa; Nisse Vasenius
1970	(United States) Phoenix	United States; John Robert Foster; Margaret Murdock; John Writer; Lones Wigger	(Soviet Union) Soviet Union; Valentin Kornev; Boris Melnik; Vitali Parkhimovitch; Sergei Yermilov	(Czechoslovakia) Czechoslovakia; Karel Bulan; Petr Kovářík; Rudolf Pojer; Antonín Schwarz
1974	(Switzerland) Thun	United States; Lanny Bassham; John Robert Foster; Lones Wigger; John Writer	(Soviet Union) Soviet Union; Vladimir Agishev; Valentin Kornev; Gennadi Lushikov; Boris Melnik	(Czechoslovakia) Czechoslovakia; Karel Bulan; Petr Kovářík; Libor Kurka; Karel Skyba
1978	(South Korea) Seoul	United States; Ray Carter; David Kimes; Lones Wigger; Webster Wright	(Switzerland) Switzerland; Kuno Bertschy; Walter Inderbitzin; Charles Jermann; Ueli Sarbach	(Finland) Finland; Osmo Ala-Honkola; Juhani Laakso; Jaakko Minkkinen; Mauri Roeppaenen
1982	(Venezuela) Caracas	(Soviet Union) Soviet Union; Victor Daniltchenko; Gennadi Larin; Gennadi Lushikov; Vladimir Lvov	United States; Ray Carter; Glenn Dubis; David Kimes; Lones Wigger	(West Germany) Federal Republic of Germany; Hubert Bichler; Peter Heinz; Ulrich Lind; Rudolf Krenn
1986	(Sweden) Skövde	(Norway) Norway; Harald Stenvaag; Geir Skirbekk; Kare Inge Viken	United States; Robert Aylward; Glenn Dubis; Lones Wigger	(Soviet Union) Soviet Union; Victor Daniltchenko; Gennadi Lushikov; Alexander Mitrofanov
1990	(Soviet Union) Moscow	France; Pascal Bessy; Roger Chassat; Dominique Maquin	(Soviet Union) Soviet Union; Anatoli Klimenko; Igor Maksakov; Hrachya Petikyan	(Czechoslovakia) Czechoslovakia; Milan Bakeš; Petr Kůrka; Pavel Liskovec

== 300 metre free rifle kneeling 40 shots, men ==
This event was held at World Championships in 1897–1990.

Year	Place	Gold	Silver	Bronze
1897	(France) Lyon	Frank Jullien (SUI)	Alcide Hirschy (SUI)	Henrik Sillem (NED)
1898	(Italy) Turin	Konrad Stäheli (SUI)	Achille Paroche (FRA)	Léon Moreaux (FRA)
1899	(Netherlands) Loosduinen	Konrad Stäheli (SUI)	Emil Kellenberger (SUI)	Henrik Sillem (NED)
1900	(France) Paris	Konrad Stäheli (SUI)	Emil Kellenberger (SUI); Anders Peter Nielsen (DEN)	
1901	(Switzerland) Lucerne	Konrad Stäheli (SUI)	Emil Kellenberger (SUI)	Alfred Gruetter (SUI)
1902	(Italy) Rome	Konrad Stäheli (SUI)	Emil Kellenberger (SUI)	Gian Galeazzo Cantoni (ITA)
1903	(Argentina) Buenos Aires	Emil Kellenberger (SUI)	Attilio Conti (ITA)	Louis Richardet (SUI)
1904	(France) Lyon	Heinrich Schellenberg (SUI)	Konrad Stäheli (SUI)	Louis Richardet (SUI)
1905	(Belgium) Brussels	Louis Richardet (SUI)	Edouard Myin (BEL)	Charles Paumier du Verger (BEL)
1906	(Italy) Milan	Charles Paumier du Verger (BEL)	Ernst Stumpf (SUI)	Konrad Stäheli (SUI)
1907	(Switzerland) Zurich	Jean Reich (SUI)	Konrad Stäheli (SUI)	Ernst Stumpf (SUI)
1908	(Austria) Vienna	Charles Paumier du Verger (BEL)	Jean Reich (SUI)	Caspar Widmer (SUI)
1909	(Germany) Hamburg	Caspar Widmer (SUI)	Konrad Stäheli (SUI)	Attilio Conti (ITA)
1910	(Netherlands) Loosduinen	Konrad Stäheli (SUI)	Caspar Widmer (SUI)	Jean Reich (SUI)
1911	(Italy) Rome	Konrad Stäheli (SUI)	Jean Reich (SUI)	Jakob Bryner (SUI)
1912	(France) Bayonne, Biarritz	Konrad Stäheli (SUI)	Marcel Meyer de Stadelhofen (SUI)	Fritz Kuchen (SUI)
1913	(United States) Camp Perry	Konrad Stäheli (SUI)	Mathias Brunner (SUI)	Jean Reich (SUI)
1914	(Denmark) Viborg	Konrad Stäheli (SUI)	Rene Georges (FRA)	Mathias Brunner (SUI)
1921	(France) Lyon	Walter Raymond Stokes (USA)	Josias Hartmann (SUI)	Carl Townsend Osburn (USA)
1922	(Italy) Milan	Walter Raymond Stokes (USA)	Walter Lienhard (SUI)	Josias Hartmann (SUI)
1923	(United States) Camp Perry	Morris Fisher (USA)	Walter Raymond Stokes (USA)	Laurence Adam Nuesslein (USA)
1924	(France) Reims	Morris Fisher (USA)	Lars Jørgen Madsen (DEN)	Juan Martino (ARG)
1925	(Switzerland) St. Gallen	Josias Hartmann (SUI)	Walter Lienhard (SUI)	Jakob Reich (SUI)
1927	(Italy) Rome	Josias Hartmann (SUI)	Karl Zimmermann (SUI)	Walter Lienhard (SUI)
1928	(Netherlands) Loosduinen	Karl Zimmermann (SUI)	Josias Hartmann (SUI)	Olle Ericsson I. (SWE)
1929	(Sweden) Stockholm	Karl Zimmermann (SUI)	Josias Hartmann (SUI)	Harry Renshaw (USA)
1930	(Belgium) Antwerp	Russell Seitzinger (USA)	Jakob Reich (SUI)	Emmet Oscar Swanson (USA)
1931	(Poland) Lwów	Walter Lienhard (SUI)	Sven Oscar Lindgren (FIN)	Kullervo Leskinen (FIN)
1933	(Spain) Granada	Bertil Vilhelm Rönnmark (SWE)	Fernand Demierre (SUI)	Karl Zimmermann (SUI)
1935	(Italy) Rome	Jaak Kärner (EST)	Viktor Miinalainen (FIN)	Kullervo Leskinen (FIN)
1937	(Finland) Helsinki	Elmar Kivistik (EST)	Kullervo Leskinen (FIN)	Bertil Vilhelm Rönnmark (SWE)
1939	(Switzerland) Lucerne	Karl Kübar (EST)	Harald Kivioja (EST)	Elmar Kivistik (EST)
1947	(Sweden) Stockholm	Walther Sigfrid Fröstell (SWE)	Kurt Johansson (SWE)	Pauli Aapeli Janhonen (FIN)
1949	(Argentina) Buenos Aires	Kullervo Leskinen (FIN)	Otto Horber (SUI)	Ernst Kramer (SUI)
1952	(Norway) Oslo	Vilho Ilmari Ylönenen (FIN)	Robert Bürchler (SUI)	Otto Horber (SUI)
1954	(Venezuela) Caracas	Anatoli Bogdanov (URS)	Nils Johan Sundberg (SWE)	Vilho Ilmari Ylönenen (FIN)
1958	(Soviet Union) Moscow	Verle Franklin Jun. Wright (USA)	Daniel Bruce Puckel (USA)	Esa Einari Kervinen (FIN)
1962	(Egypt) Cairo	Erwin Vogt (SUI)	Kurt Mueller (SUI)	Vladimir Yevdokimov (URS)
1966	(West Germany) Wiesbaden	John Robert Foster (USA)	Alexander Gerasimenok (URS)	Kurt Johansson (SWE)
1970	(United States) Phoenix	Lajos Papp (HUN)	Vitali Parkhimovitch (URS)	Rudolf Pojer (TCH)
1974	(Switzerland) Thun	John Robert Foster (USA)	Max Huerzeler (SUI)	Eugeniusz Pędzisz (POL)
1978	(South Korea) Seoul	Kuno Bertschy (SUI)	Tore Hartz (NOR)	Juhani Laakso (FIN)
1982	(Venezuela) Caracas	Victor Daniltchenko (URS)	Kuno Bertschy (SUI)	Malcolm Cooper (GBR)
1986	(Sweden) Skövde	Glenn Dubis (USA)	Mauri Roeppaenen (FIN)	Robert Aylward (USA)
1990	(Soviet Union) Moscow	Malcolm Cooper (GBR)	Joergen Herlufsen (DEN)	Hubert Bichler (FRG)

== 300 metre free rifle kneeling 40 shots, men team ==
This event was held at World Championships in 1937–1990.

Year	Place	Gold	Silver	Bronze
1937	(Finland) Helsinki	(Estonia) Estonia; Harald Kivioja; Elmar Kivistik; August Liivik; Alfred Kukk; Gustav Lokotar	(Finland) Finland; Olavi Elo; Kullervo Leskinen; Viktor Miinalainen; Einari Oksa; Nisse Vasenius	(Switzerland) Switzerland; Marcio Ciocco; Emil Gruenig; Otto Horber; Albert Salzmann; Karl Zimmermann
1970	(United States) Phoenix	(Soviet Union) Soviet Union; Valentin Kornev; Boris Melnik; Vitali Parkhimovitch; Sergei Yermilov	United States; John Robert Foster; Margaret Murdock; Lones Wigger; John Writer	(Switzerland) Switzerland; Andreas Beyeler; Erich Burgin; Theo Ditzler; Emile Kohler
1974	(Switzerland) Thun	(Poland) Poland; Jozef Botwin; Henryk Górski; Eugeniusz Pędzisz; Andrzej Sieledcow	United States; Lanny Bassham; John Robert Foster; Lones Wigger; John Writer	(Switzerland) Switzerland; Max Huerzeler; Charles Hermann; Martin Truttmann; Erwin Vogt
1978	(South Korea) Seoul	(Switzerland) Switzerland; Kuno Bertschy; Walter Inderbitzin; Charles Jermann; Ueli Sarbach	United States; Ray Carter; David Kimes; Lones Wigger; Webster Wright	(Finland) Finland; Osmo Ala-Honkola; Juhani Laakso; Jaakko Minkkinen; Mauri Roeppaenen
1982	(Venezuela) Caracas	(Soviet Union) Soviet Union; Victor Daniltchenko; Gennadi Larin; Gennadi Lushikov; Vladimir Lvov	(Norway) Norway; Trond Kjoell; Geir Skirbekk; Harald Stenvaag; Kare Inge Viken	United States; Ray Carter; Glenn Dubis; David Kimes; Lones Wigger
1986	(Sweden) Skövde	(Soviet Union) Soviet Union; Victor Daniltchenko; Gennadi Lushikov; Alexander Mitrofanov	United States; Robert Aylward; Glenn Dubis; Lones Wigger	France; Pascal Bessy; Michel Bury; Dominique Maquin
1990	(Soviet Union) Moscow	(Sweden) Sweden; Goran Jansson; Roger Jansson; Michael Larsson	(Soviet Union) Soviet Union; Anatoli Klimenko; Igor Maksakov; Hrachya Petikyan	(Switzerland) Switzerland; Olivier Cottagnoud; Pierre-Alain Dufaux; Norbert Sturny

== 300 metre army rifle prone, men ==
This event was held at World Championships in 1911–1939.

Year	Place	Gold	Silver	Bronze
1911	(Italy) Rome	Carlo Ernesto Panza (ITA)	Gerard Anne van Den Bergh (NED)	Léon Moreaux (FRA)
1912	(France) Bayonne, Biarritz	Julio Castro Del Rosario (ESP)	Harry Simon (USA)	Alfredo Galli (ITA)
1913	(United States) Camp Perry	Pereyra (ARG)	Yanez (ARG)	Ernest Eddy (USA)
1914	(Denmark) Viborg	André Barbillat (FRA)	Albert Courquin (FRA)	Walter E. (FRA)
1921	(France) Lyon	Dupuis I. (FRA)	Karl Zimmermann (SUI)	Léon Johnson (FRA)
1922	(Italy) Milan	Erik Sætter-Lassen (DEN)	Gian Galeazzo Cantoni (ITA)	Carlo Riccetti (ITA)
1923	(United States) Camp Perry	Boa J. (CAN)	Ned Moor E. (USA)	van Spreekens B. (NED)
1924	(France) Reims	Antonio Rico (ARG)	Anders Vilhelm Andersson (SWE)	Mauritz Eriksson (SWE)
1925	(Switzerland) St. Gallen	Miard P. (FRA)	Roger Isenegger (SUI)	Walter Lienhard (SUI)
1927	(Italy) Rome	Franco Micheli (ITA)	Ricardo Ticchi (ITA)	Wladyslaw Borzemski (POL)
1928	(Netherlands) Loosduinen	Julio Castro Del Rosario (ESP)	Freminet (FRA)	Mauritz Eriksson (SWE)
1929	(Sweden) Stockholm	Ernst Malmgren (SWE)	Olle Ericsson I. (SWE)	František Čermák (TCH)
1930	(Belgium) Antwerp	Karl Zimmermann (SUI)	Camillo Isnardi (ITA)	Lucien Genot (FRA)
1931	(Poland) Lwów	Marcel Bonin (FRA)	Lucien Genot (FRA)	Uno Weckstroem (FIN)
1933	(Spain) Granada	Nils Persson (SWE)	Karl August Larsson (SWE)	Josias Hartmann (SUI)
1935	(Italy) Rome	Brion M. (FRA)	Albert Salzmann (SUI)	Sven Oscar Lindgren (FIN)
1937	(Finland) Helsinki	Kalle Liujala (FIN)	Elis Ekman (FIN)	Kullervo Leskinen (FIN)
1939	(Switzerland) Lucerne	Walter Gehmann (GER)	Gustav Eichelberger (SUI)	Johannes Vilberg (EST)

== 300 metre army rifle prone, men team ==
This event was held at World Championships in 1937.

Year	Place	Gold	Silver	Bronze
1937	(Finland) Helsinki	(Finland) Finland; Lauri Kaarto; Granbohm L. Viljo Leskinen; Elis Ekman; Kullervo Leskinen	(Sweden) Sweden; Olle Ericsson I. Kurt Johansson; Bertil Vilhelm Rönnmark; Trang E. Zachrisson B.	France; Marcel Bonin; Raymond Durand; Marcel Fitoussi; Lucien Genot; Jacques Louis Mazoyer

== 300 metre army rifle standing, men ==
This event was held at World Championships in 1911–1939.

Year	Place	Gold	Silver	Bronze
1911	(Italy) Rome	Auguste Marion (FRA)	Lommel V. L. (NED)	Attilio Conti (ITA)
1912	(France) Bayonne, Biarritz	Ernest Eddy (USA)	Gian Galeazzo Cantoni (ITA)	Julio Castro Del Rosario (ESP)
1913	(United States) Camp Perry	Mauritz Eriksson (SWE)	Pourquala (ARG)	Paul Rene Colas (FRA)
1914	(Denmark) Viborg	Aix Bouwens (NED)	Anders Martinus Petersen (DEN)	Niels Hansen Ditlev Larsen (DEN)
1921	(France) Lyon	Raffaele Frasca (ITA)	Achille Paroche (FRA)	Camillo Isnardi (ITA)
1922	(Italy) Milan	Carlo Ernesto Panza (ITA)	Albert Troendle (SUI)	Josias Hartmann (SUI)
1923	(United States) Camp Perry	Ned Moor E. (USA)	André Regaud (FRA)	Boa J. (CAN)
1924	(France) Reims	François Jacques Florentin Lafortune (BEL)	Josias Hartmann (SUI)	Aix Bouwens (NED)
1925	(Switzerland) St. Gallen	Karl Zimmermann (SUI)	Aix Bouwens (NED)	Vandesutte (FRA)
1927	(Italy) Rome	Louis Gouery (FRA)	Gian Galeazzo Cantoni (ITA)	Carlo Ernesto Panza (ITA)
1928	(Netherlands) Loosduinen	Walter Lienhard (SUI)	Mauritz Eriksson (SWE)	Karl Zimmermann (SUI)
1929	(Sweden) Stockholm	Josias Hartmann (SUI)	Olle Ericsson I. (SWE)	Lodovico Nulli (ITA)
1930	(Belgium) Antwerp	Christiaan Johannes Petrus Both (NED)	Rudolf Brachtl (TCH)	Wilhelm Schnyder (SUI)
1931	(Poland) Lwów	Andrzej Matuszak (POL)	Uno Weckstroem (FIN)	Karl Zimmermann (SUI)
1933	(Spain) Granada	Domingo Rodriguez Somoza (ESP)	Marcel Fitoussi (FRA)	Jose de Linos (ESP)
1935	(Italy) Rome	Olle Ericsson I. (SWE)	Christiaan Johannes Petrus Both (NED)	Karl Zimmermann (SUI)
1937	(Finland) Helsinki	Johannes Vilberg (EST)	Olavi Elo (FIN)	Lucien Genot (FRA)
1939	(Switzerland) Lucerne	Jakob Brod (GER)	Lauri Kaarto (FIN)	Albert Salzmann (SUI)

== 300 metre army rifle standing, men team ==
This event was held at World Championships in 1937.

Year	Place	Gold	Silver	Bronze
1937	(Finland) Helsinki	(Finland) Finland; Elis Ekman; Granbohm L. Lauri Kaarto; Kullervo Leskinen; Viljo Leskinen	(Estonia) Estonia; Villem Jaanson; Karl Juergens; Heinrich Silber; Gustav Lokotar; Leonhard Viljus	(Switzerland) Switzerland; Marcio Ciocco; Emil Gruenig; Otto Horber; Albert Salzmann; Karl Zimmermann

== 300 metre army rifle kneeling, men ==
This event was held at World Championships in 1911–1939.

Year	Place	Gold	Silver	Bronze
1911	(Italy) Rome	Caspar Widmer (SUI)	Uylke Vuurman (NED)	Burchell R. (NED)
1912	(France) Bayonne, Biarritz	Fritz Kuchen (SUI)	Ricardo Ticchi (ITA)	Lebet (FRA)
1913	(United States) Camp Perry	Toennes Bjoerkman (SWE)	John Nilsson (SWE)	Otto Christiansson (SWE)
1914	(Denmark) Viborg	Svend Tomsen (DEN)	Erik Gustaf Blomqvist (SWE)	André Barbillat (FRA)
1921	(France) Lyon	Camillo Isnardi (ITA)	Albert Regnier (FRA)	Carl Townsend Osburn (USA)
1922	(Italy) Milan	Wilhelm Schnyder (SUI)	Hans Pfeiderer (SUI)	Fritz Zulauf (SUI)
1923	(United States) Camp Perry	van Spreekens B. (NED)	Boa J. (CAN)	Ned Moor E. (USA)
1924	(France) Reims	Raymond Durand (FRA)	Walter Lienhard (SUI)	Josias Hartmann (SUI)
1925	(Switzerland) St. Gallen	Louis Gouery (FRA)	Pedersen P. J. (DEN)	Niels Hansen Ditlev Larsen (DEN)
1927	(Italy) Rome	Ricardo Ticchi (ITA)	Johannes Petrus Scheuter (NED)	Fritz Kuchen (SUI)
1928	(Netherlands) Loosduinen	Ernst Tellenbach (SUI)	Ugo Cantelli (ITA)	Walter Lienhard (SUI)
1929	(Sweden) Stockholm	Karl Zimmermann (SUI)	Camillo Isnardi (ITA)	Eduard Zumstein (SUI)
1930	(Belgium) Antwerp	Karl Zimmermann (SUI)	Wilhelm Schnyder (SUI)	François Jacques Florentin Lafortune (BEL)
1931	(Poland) Lwów	Wilhelm Schnyder (SUI)	Jan Wrzosek (POL)	Karl Zimmermann (SUI)
1933	(Spain) Granada	de Las Heras E. (ESP)	Cristobal Tauler Alos (ESP)	Ballesteros (ESP)
1935	(Italy) Rome	Sven Oscar Lindgren (FIN)	Osmo Rantala (FIN)	Giuseppe Goivanelli (ITA)
1937	(Finland) Helsinki	Karl Zimmermann (SUI)	Emil Gruenig (SUI)	Lauri Kaarto (FIN)
1939	(Switzerland) Lucerne	Karl Zimmermann (SUI)	Otto Horber (SUI)	Peeter Karu (EST)

== 300 metre army rifle kneeling, men team ==
This event was held at World Championships in 1937.

Year	Place	Gold	Silver	Bronze
1937	(Finland) Helsinki	(Switzerland) Switzerland; Marcio Ciocco; Emil Gruenig; Otto Horber; Albert Salzmann; Karl Zimmermann	(Estonia) Estonia; Karl Juergens; Villem Jaanson; Heinrich Silber; Gustav Lokotar; Leonhard Viljus	(Finland) Finland; Elis Ekman; Granbohm L. Lauri Kaarto; Kullervo Leskinen; Viljo Leskinen

== 300 metre army rifle 3X40 shots, men ==
This event was held at World Championships in 1939.

Year	Place	Gold	Silver	Bronze
1939	(Switzerland) Lucerne	Karl Zimmermann (SUI)	Peeter Karu (EST)	Albert Salzmann (SUI)

== 300 metre army rifle 3X30 shots, men ==
This event was held at World Championships in 1911.

Year	Place	Gold	Silver	Bronze
1911	(Italy) Rome	Louis Percy (FRA)	Maurice Marie Lecoq (FRA)	Aix Bouwens (NED)

== 300 metre army rifle 3X20 shots, men ==
This event was held at World Championships in 1912–1939.

Year	Place	Gold	Silver	Bronze
1912	(France) Bayonne, Biarritz	Julio Castro Del Rosario (ESP)	Fritz Kuchen (SUI)	Konrad Stäheli (SUI)
1913	(United States) Camp Perry	Mauritz Eriksson (SWE)	Benjamin Tealdi (ARG)	Mendez (ARG)
1914	(Denmark) Viborg	Aix Bouwens (NED)	Antonius Hubertus Maria Bouwens (NED)	Roberto Walfer (ITA)
1921	(France) Lyon	Camillo Isnardi (ITA)	Ricardo Ticchi (ITA)	Léon Johnson (FRA)
1922	(Italy) Milan	Emil Kellenberger (SUI)	Hans Pfeiderer (SUI)	Camillo Isnardi (ITA)
1923	(United States) Camp Perry	Ned Moor E. (USA)	Boa J. (CAN)	van Spreekens B. (NED)
1924	(France) Reims	Antonio Rico (ARG)	Walter Lienhard (SUI)	Carl Townsend Osburn (USA)
1925	(Switzerland) St. Gallen	Karl Zimmermann (SUI)	Walter Lienhard (SUI)	Wilhelm Schnyder (SUI)
1927	(Italy) Rome	Carlo Ernesto Panza (ITA)	Ricardo Ticchi (ITA)	Gian Galeazzo Cantoni (ITA)
1928	(Netherlands) Loosduinen	Walter Lienhard (SUI)	Mauritz Eriksson (SWE)	Karl Zimmermann (SUI)
1929	(Sweden) Stockholm	Olle Ericsson I. (SWE)	Josias Hartmann (SUI)	Karl Zimmermann (SUI)
1930	(Belgium) Antwerp	Karl Zimmermann (SUI)	Camillo Isnardi (ITA)	Georges Roes (FRA)
1931	(Poland) Lwów	Karl Zimmermann (SUI)	Uno Weckstroem (FIN)	Boleslaw Gosciewicz (POL)
1933	(Spain) Granada	Bertil Vilhelm Rönnmark (SWE)	Jose de Linos (ESP)	Karl Zimmermann (SUI)
1935	(Italy) Rome	Sven Oscar Lindgren (FIN)	Karl Zimmermann (SUI)	Olle Ericsson I. (SWE)
1937	(Finland) Helsinki	Olavi Elo (FIN)	Karl Zimmermann (SUI)	Lauri Kaarto (FIN)
1939	(Switzerland) Lucerne	Lucien Genot (FRA)	Walter Lienhard (SUI)	Karl Zimmermann (SUI)

== 300 metre army rifle 3X20 shots, men team ==
This event was held at World Championships in 1935–1939.

Year	Place	Gold	Silver	Bronze
1935	(Italy) Rome	(Hungary) Hungary; Zoltan Hradetzky Soos-Ruszka; Antal Simonfay; Tibor Tarits; Istvan Prepeliczay; Bertalan Zsoter	(Sweden) Sweden; Olle Ericsson I. Sven Dessle; Karl August Larsson; Rönnmark L. Bertil Vilhelm Rönnmark	(Switzerland) Switzerland; Burgdorfer E. Gustav Eichelberger; Albert Salzmann; Beat Rhyner; Karl Zimmermann
1937	(Finland) Helsinki	(Switzerland) Switzerland; Marcio Ciocco; Emil Gruenig; Otto Horber; Albert Salzmann; Karl Zimmermann	(Finland) Finland; Elis Ekman; Granbohm L. Lauri Kaarto; Kullervo Leskinen; Viljo Leskinen	(Estonia) Estonia; Karl Juergens; Villem Jaanson; Gustav Lokotar; Heinrich Silber; Leonhard Viljus
1939	(Switzerland) Lucerne	(Switzerland) Switzerland; Josias Hartmann; Otto Horber; Walter Lienhard; Ernst Tellenbach; Karl Zimmermann	(Finland) Finland; Elomaa V. Herranen O. Granbohm L. Lauri Kaarto; Tammi E.	(Estonia) Estonia; Peeter Karu; Karl Juergens; Vladimir Kukk; Johannes Vilberg; Leonhard Viljus

== 300 metre army rifle 30 fast shots, men ==
This event was held at World Championships in 1962.

Year	Place	Gold	Silver	Bronze
1962	(Egypt) Cairo	Hans Schoenenberger (SUI)	August Hollenstein (SUI)	Hans Simonet (SUI)

== 300 metre army rifle URS-system, men ==
This event was held at World Championships in 1958.

Year	Place	Gold	Silver	Bronze
1958	(Soviet Union) Moscow	Ivan Novozilov (URS)	Ladislav Cerveny (TCH)	Anatoly Pehtyerev (URS)

== 300 metre army rifle URS-system, men team ==
This event was held at World Championships in 1958.

Year	Place	Gold	Silver	Bronze
1958	(Soviet Union) Moscow	(Soviet Union) Soviet Union; Ivan Novozilov; Alexander Orlov; Anatoly Pehtyerev; Anatoly Tilik	(Czechoslovakia) Czechoslovakia; Ladislav Cerveny; Vladimir Stiborik; Jan Sivcak; Jaromir Vala	(North Korea) Democratic People's Republic of Korea; Ch. Hong; Kyung Ho Kim; Kim T. Kim P.

== 300 metre army rifle ARG-system, men ==
This event was held at World Championships in 1949.

Year	Place	Gold	Silver	Bronze
1949	(Argentina) Buenos Aires	Pablo Cagnasso (ARG)	Olavi Elo (FIN)	Emil Gruenig (SUI)

== 300 metre army rifle ARG-system, men team ==
This event was held at World Championships in 1949.

Year	Place	Gold	Silver	Bronze
1949	(Argentina) Buenos Aires	(Sweden) Sweden; Uno Hilding Berg; Sven Dessle; Isac Holger Erben; Kurt Johansson	(Finland) Finland; Olavi Elo; Pauli Aapeli Janhonen; Kullervo Leskinen; Mikko Johannes Nordquist	(Argentina) Argentina; Antonio Ando; Pablo Cagnasso; Cabrera C. Ramon Hagen

== 300 metre army rifle 50 rapid fire shots, men ==
This event was held at World Championships in 1947.

Year	Place	Gold	Silver	Bronze
1947	(Sweden) Stockholm	Otto Horber (SUI)	Karl Zimmermann (SUI)	Lennart Eriksson (SWE)

== 300 metre army rifle 50 rapid fire shots, men team ==
This event was held at World Championships in 1947.

Year	Place	Gold	Silver	Bronze
1947	(Sweden) Stockholm	(Switzerland) Switzerland; Emil Gruenig; Otto Horber; Ernst Tellenbach; Karl Zimmermann	(Sweden) Sweden; Lennart Eriksson; Follmark A. Kallin B. Malmberg H.	(Norway) Norway; Glomnes S. Fredbo J. Willy Røgeberg; Vik S.

== 100 metre and 200 metre free rifle prone 60 shots, men ==
This event was held at World Championships in 1931.

Year	Place	Gold	Silver	Bronze
1931	(Poland) Lwów	Jerzy Podoski (POL)	Bertil Vilhelm Rönnmark (SWE)	John Keith Boles (USA)

== 50 yards and 100 yards rifle prone 30+30 shots, men ==
This event was held at World Championships in 1947–1958.

Year	Place	Gold	Silver	Bronze
1947	(Sweden) Stockholm	Odd Sannes (NOR)	Erland Koch (SWE)	Olavi Onni Albin Hynninen (FIN)
1949	(Argentina) Buenos Aires	Arthur Charles Jackson (USA)	Thore Skredegaard (NOR)	Halvor Kongsjorden (NOR)
1952	(Norway) Oslo	Arthur Charles Jackson (USA)	Verle Franklin Jun. Wright (USA)	Sven Dessle (SWE)
1954	(Venezuela) Caracas	Gilmour Stuart Boa (CAN)	Kurt Johansson (SWE)	August Westergaard (USA)
1958	(Soviet Union) Moscow	Mikko Johannes Nordquist (FIN)	Velitchko Velitchkov Christov (BUL)	David Parish (GBR)

== 50 yards and 100 yards rifle prone 30+30 shots, men team ==
This event was held at World Championships in 1947–1958.

Year	Place	Gold	Silver	Bronze
1947	(Sweden) Stockholm	(Sweden) Sweden; Sven Dessle; Hulstroem O. Erland Koch; Oernstroem R.	(Norway) Norway; Mauritz Amundsen; Johan Hunæs; Willy Røgeberg; Odd Sannes	(United Kingdom) Great Britain; John Chandler; Victor Henry Gilbert; James Jones; Sonley C.
1949	(Argentina) Buenos Aires	(Norway) Norway; Mauritz Amundsen; Johan Hunæs; Halvor Kongsjorden; Willy Røgeberg; Thore Skredegaard	United States; Arthur Edwin Cook; Arthur Charles Jackson; Robert Sandager; Emmet Oscar Swanson; August Westergaard	(Switzerland) Switzerland; Bachofner A. Robert Bürchler; Clavadetscher G. Emil Gruenig; Otto Horber
1952	(Norway) Oslo	United States; Arthur Edwin Cook; Arthur Charles Jackson; Emmet Oscar Swanson; Verle Franklin Jun. Wright	(Norway) Norway; Mauritz Amundsen; Johan Hunæs; Thore Skredegaard; Odd Sannes	(Germany); Walter Gehmann; Erich Hotopf; Albert Sigl; Wagner J.
1954	(Venezuela) Caracas	United States; Arthur Edwin Cook; Arthur Charles Jackson; August Westergaard; Verle Franklin Jun. Wright	(Sweden) Sweden; Uno Hilding Berg; Isac Holger Erben; Kurt Johansson; Wiberg A.	(Soviet Union) Soviet Union; Anatoli Bogdanov; Vasily Borisov; Moysey Itkis; Boris Pereberin
1958	(Soviet Union) Moscow	(Soviet Union) Soviet Union; Vladimir Lukyanchuk; Marat Niyazov; Boris Pereberin; Enn Rusi	(Finland) Finland; Pauli Aapeli Janhonen; Mikko Johannes Nordquist; Jorma Tuomas Taitto; Vilho Ilmari Ylönen	(United Kingdom) Great Britain; Steffen Borries Olrik Cranmer; Fardon J. Nigel Oakley; David Parish

== 50 metre free rifle prone 40 shots, men ==
This event was held at World Championships in 1929–1970.

Year	Place	Gold	Silver	Bronze
1929	(Sweden) Stockholm	Karl August Larsson (SWE)	Einari Oksa (FIN)	Lars Klaerich (FIN)
1930	(Belgium) Antwerp	Sven Oscar Lindgren (FIN)	Kullervo Leskinen (FIN)	Erhard Kubstrup (DEN)
1931	(Poland) Lwów	Bertil Vilhelm Rönnmark (SWE)	Lucien Genot (FRA)	Karl August Larsson (SWE)
1933	(Spain) Granada	Longhurst H. S. (GBR)	Bertil Vilhelm Rönnmark (SWE)	Morse F. S. (GBR)
1935	(Italy) Rome	Raymond Durand (FRA)	Johannes Vilberg (EST)	Jacques Louis Mazoyer (FRA)
1937	(Finland) Helsinki	Johan Albert Ravila (FIN)	David Carlson (USA)	Eduard Seren (EST)
1939	(Switzerland) Lucerne	Toivo Maenttaeri (FIN)	Staks R. (LAT)	Kurt Johansson (SWE)
1947	(Sweden) Stockholm	Willy Røgeberg (NOR)	Jonas Jonsson (SWE)	Kurt Johansson (SWE)
1949	(Argentina) Buenos Aires	Arthur Edwin Cook (USA)	Toivo Maenttaeri (FIN)	Uno Hilding Berg (SWE)
1952	(Norway) Oslo	Arthur Charles Jackson (USA)	Uffe Schultz Larsen (DEN)	Arthur Edwin Cook (USA)
1954	(Venezuela) Caracas	Vasily Borisov (URS)	Anders Helge Kvissberg (SWE)	Iver Aas (NOR)
1958	(Soviet Union) Moscow	Nigel Oakley (GBR)	Vladimir Lukyanchuk (URS)	Gordon Taras (USA)
1970	(United States) Phoenix	Laszlo Dr. Hammerl (HUN)	Esa Einari Kervinen (FIN)	Klaus Zähringer (FRG)

== 50 metre free rifle prone 40 shots, men team ==
This event was held at World Championships in 1929–1958.

Year	Place	Gold	Silver	Bronze
1929	(Sweden) Stockholm	(Finland) Finland; Aro V. Lars Klaerich; Sven Oscar Lindgren; Einari Oksa; Johan Albert Ravila	(Sweden) Sweden; Olle Ericsson I. Karl August Larsson; Larsson N. Esbjoern Svensson; Ivar Wester K.	United States; Blakley J. Harry Renshaw; Thomas Sharpe J. Russell Seitzinger; Woods P.
1930	(Belgium) Antwerp	(Denmark) Denmark; Erhard Kubstrup; Soerensen K. Bjoern A. Pedersen P. J. Anders Peter Nielsen	(Finland) Finland; Kullervo Leskinen; Sven Oscar Lindgren; Einari Oksa; Niilo Talvenheimo; Toivonen E.	United States; William Bruce; Morris Fisher; Harry Renshaw; Russell Seitzinger; Emmet Oscar Swanson
1931	(Poland) Lwów	(Sweden) Sweden; Erland Koch; Karl August Larsson; Olle Ericsson I. Tage Eriksson; Bertil Vilhelm Rönnmark	(Norway) Norway; Mauritz Amundsen; Sverre Glomnes; Johannes Groenli; Willy Røgeberg; Larsen T	(Finland) Finland; Kullervo Leskinen; Sven Oscar Lindgren; Einari Oksa; Johan Albert Ravila; Uno Weckstroem
1933	(Spain) Granada	(Sweden) Sweden; Gustaf Emil Andersson; Olle Ericsson I. Karl August Larsson; Bertil Vilhelm Rönnmark; Ivar Wester K.	(Finland) Finland; Kullervo Leskinen; Viljo Leskinen; Viktor Miinalainen; Einari Oksa; Osmo Rantala	(United Kingdom) Great Britain; French; Foster; Langdon G. Longhurst H. S. Morse F. S.
1935	(Italy) Rome	(Estonia) Estonia; Villem Jaanson; Eduard Seren; Gustav Lokotar; Endel Rikand; Johannes Vilberg	(Sweden) Sweden; Olle Ericsson I. Eriksson T. Erland Koch; Karl August Larsson; Bertil Vilhelm Rönnmark	France; Marcel Bouchez; Raymond Durand; Marcel Fitoussi; Lucien Genot; Jacques Louis Mazoyer
1937	(Finland) Helsinki	United States; Adams J. David Carlson; Schweitzer W. William Woodring; Catherine Woodring	(Finland) Finland; Halonen S. Lausamo T. Viljo Leskinen; Toivo Maenttaeri; Johan Albert Ravila	(Estonia) Estonia; Villem Jaanson; Elmar Kivistik; Ernst Rull; Gustav Lokotar; Eduard Seren
1939	(Switzerland) Lucerne	(Estonia) Estonia; Elmar Kivistik; Villem Jaanson; Harald Kivioja; August Liivik; Ernst Rull	(Sweden) Sweden; Foennmark B. Olle Ericsson I. Jonas Jonsson; Kurt Johansson; Erland Koch	(Germany); Walter Gehmann; Albert Sigl; Erich Spoerer; Sturm R. Karl Steigelmann
1947	(Sweden) Stockholm	(Sweden) Sweden; Uno Hilding Berg; Isac Holger Erben; Jonas Jonsson; Kurt Johansson; Erland Koch	(Finland) Finland; Olavi Elo; Pauli Aapeli Janhonen; Olavi Onni Albin Hynninen; Toivo Maenttaeri; Osmo Rantala	(Norway) Norway; Johan Hunæs; Halvor Kongsjorden; Willy Røgeberg; Odd Sannes; Thore Skredegaard
1952	(Norway) Oslo	(Switzerland) Switzerland; Robert Bürchler; Emil Gruenig; Otto Horber; Ernst Huber; Schmid E.	(Norway) Norway; Mauritz Amundsen; Johan Hunæs; Halvor Kongsjorden; Odd Sannes; Thore Skredegaard	United States; Arthur Edwin Cook; Arthur Charles Jackson; Emmet Oscar Swanson; August Westergaard; Verle Franklin Jun. Wright
1954	(Venezuela) Caracas	(Sweden) Sweden; Uno Hilding Berg; Isac Holger Erben; Kurt Johansson; Anders Helge Kvissberg; Nils Johan Sundberg	(Norway) Norway; Mauritz Amundsen; Anker Hagen; Erling Asbjørn Kongshaug; Thore Skredegaard; Thorsrud A.	(Soviet Union) Soviet Union; Anatoli Bogdanov; Vasily Borisov; Moysey Itkis; Grigori Kupko; Boris Pereberin
1958	(Soviet Union) Moscow	(United Kingdom) Great Britain; Steffen Borries Olrik Cranmer; Fardon J. Nigel Oakley; David Parish; Powell J.	(Romania) Romania; Dumitrescu N. Iosif Sîrbu; Petre Șandor; Vidrascu D.	(Soviet Union) Soviet Union; Vasily Borisov; Moysey Itkis; Vladimir Lukyanchuk; Marat Niyazov; Viktor Shamburkin

== 50 metre free rifle standing 40 shots, men ==
This event was held at World Championships in 1929–1990.

Year	Place	Gold	Silver	Bronze
1929	(Sweden) Stockholm	Olle Ericsson I. (SWE)	Pedersen P. J. (DEN)	Einari Oksa (FIN)
1930	(Belgium) Antwerp	Pedersen P. J. (DEN)	Erhard Kubstrup (DEN)	Harry Renshaw (USA)
1931	(Poland) Lwów	Mauritz Amundsen (NOR)	Einari Oksa (FIN)	Kullervo Leskinen (FIN)
1933	(Spain) Granada	Charles Coquelin de Lisle (FRA)	Marcel Fitoussi (FRA)	Kullervo Leskinen (FIN)
1935	(Italy) Rome	Kullervo Leskinen (FIN)	Willy Røgeberg (NOR)	Olle Ericsson I. (SWE)
1937	(Finland) Helsinki	Jacques Louis Mazoyer (FRA)	Viljo Leskinen (FIN)	August Liivik (EST)
1939	(Switzerland) Lucerne	Karl Steigelmann (GER)	Endel Rikand (EST)	August Liivik (EST)
1947	(Sweden) Stockholm	Isac Holger Erben (SWE)	Mauritz Amundsen (NOR)	Erling Asbjørn Kongshaug (NOR)
1949	(Argentina) Buenos Aires	Pauli Aapeli Janhonen (FIN)	Erling Asbjørn Kongshaug (NOR)	Isac Holger Erben (SWE)
1952	(Norway) Oslo	Erling Asbjørn Kongshaug (NOR)	Max Lenz (SUI)	August Hollenstein (SUI)
1954	(Venezuela) Caracas	Anatoli Bogdanov (URS)	Vasily Borisov (URS)	Nils Johan Sundberg (SWE)
1958	(Soviet Union) Moscow	Moysey Itkis (URS)	Viktor Shamburkin (URS)	Verle Franklin Jun. Wright (USA)
1962	(Egypt) Cairo	Gary Anderson (USA)	Erwin Vogt (SUI)	Tommy Pool (USA)
1966	(West Germany) Wiesbaden	Gary Anderson (USA)	Werner Lippoldt (GDR)	Hartmut Sommer (GDR)
1970	(United States) Phoenix	Vitali Parkhimovitch (URS)	Petr Kovářík (TCH)	John Writer (USA)
1974	(Switzerland) Thun	Lones Wigger (USA)	Gerhard Krimbacher (AUT)	Lanny Bassham (USA)
1978	(South Korea) Seoul	Esbjoern Svensson (SWE)	Jang Woon Seo (KOR)	Lanny Bassham (USA)
1982	(Venezuela) Caracas	Kirill Ivanov (URS)	Harald Stenvaag (NOR)	Rod Fitz-Randolph (USA)
1986	(East Germany) Suhl	Peter Heinz (FRG)	Milan Bakeš (TCH)	Harald Stenvaag (NOR)
1990	(Soviet Union) Moscow	Eun Chul Lee (KOR)	Enrique Claverol (ESP)	Robert Foth (USA)

== 50 metre free rifle standing 40 shots, men team ==
This event was held at World Championships in 1929–1990.

Year	Place	Gold	Silver	Bronze
1929	(Sweden) Stockholm	(Switzerland) Switzerland; Josias Hartmann; Walter Lienhard; Fritz Kuchen; Jakob Reich; Karl Zimmermann	(Denmark) Denmark; Paul Gerlow; Moeller P. Christen Moeller; Anders Peter Nielsen; Pedersen P. J.	Norway
1930	(Belgium) Antwerp	United States; William Bruce; Thomas Sharpe J. Frank Parsons; Harry Renshaw; Russell Seitzinger	(Belgium) Belgium; Paul Van Asbroeck; Gheyssens M. Marcel Jean Josse Lafortune; François Jacques Florentin Lafortune; Sylva P.	(Denmark) Denmark; Erhard Kubstrup; Anders Peter Nielsen; Christen Moeller; Pedersen P. J. Soerensen K.
1931	(Poland) Lwów	(Finland) Finland; Einari Oksa; Sven Oscar Lindgren; Kullervo Leskinen; Niilo Talvenheimo; Viljo Leskinen	(Denmark) Denmark; Erhard Kubstrup; Krolykke G. Niels Hansen Ditlev Larsen; Pedersen P. J. Soerensen K.	(Sweden) Sweden; Gustaf Emil Andersson; Bostroem B. Eriksson T. Olle Ericsson I. Schullstroem
1933	(Spain) Granada	(Finland) Finland; Kullervo Leskinen; Viljo Leskinen; Viktor Miinalainen; Einari Oksa; Osmo Rantala	France; Charles Coquelin de Lisle; Marcel Fitoussi; Gleton; Lucien Genot; Leveugle	(Sweden) Sweden; Gustaf Emil Andersson; Olle Ericsson I. Eriksson T. Nils Persson; Bertil Vilhelm Rönnmark
1935	(Italy) Rome	(Finland) Finland; Kullervo Leskinen; Toivo Mänttäri; Einari Oksa; Osmo Rantala; Nisse Vasenius	France; Marcel Bonin; Marcel Bouchez; Marcel Fitoussi; Robert Mechet; Jacques Louis Mazoyer	(Sweden) Sweden; Sven Dessle; Olle Ericsson I. Tage Eriksson; Erland Koch; Bertil Vilhelm Rönnmark
1937	(Finland) Helsinki	(Estonia) Estonia; Elmar Kivistik; August Liivik; Ernst Rull; Vladimir Kukk; Gustav Lokotar	(Switzerland) Switzerland; Emil Gruenig; Otto Horber; Jakob Reich; Albert Salzmann; Karl Zimmermann	(Finland) Finland; Olavi Elo; Toivo Maenttaeri; Viljo Leskinen; Kullervo Leskinen; Vasenius N.
1939	(Switzerland) Lucerne	(Finland) Finland; Olavi Elo; Bruno Engelbrecht Frietsch; Pauli Aapeli Janhonen; Toivo Maenttaeri; Vasenius N.	(Germany); Jakob Brod; Albert Sigl; Erich Spoerer; Sturm R. Karl Steigelmann	(Switzerland) Switzerland; Emil Gruenig; Otto Horber; Jakob Reich; Albert Salzmann; Karl Zimmermann
1947	(Sweden) Stockholm	(Norway) Norway; Mauritz Amundsen; Halvor Kongsjorden; Erling Asbjørn Kongshaug; Willy Røgeberg; Thore Skredegaard	(Sweden) Sweden; Sven Dessle; Isac Holger Erben; Kurt Johansson; Jonas Jonsson; Naumburg N.	(Finland) Finland; Olavi Elo; Bruno Engelbrecht Frietsch; Olavi Onni Albin Hynninen; Pauli Aapeli Janhonen; Toivo Maenttaeri
1952	(Norway) Oslo	(Switzerland) Switzerland; Robert Bürchler; Ernst Huber; August Hollenstein; Max Lenz; Schmid E.	(Finland) Finland; Pauli Aapeli Janhonen; Kullervo Leskinen; Mikko Johannes Nordquist; Jorma Tuomas Taitto; Vilho Ilmari Ylönenen	(Sweden) Sweden; Uno Hilding Berg; Isac Holger Erben; Walther Sigfrid Fröstell; Kurt Johansson; Anders Helge Kvissberg
1954	(Venezuela) Caracas	(Soviet Union) Soviet Union; Anatoli Bogdanov; Vasily Borisov; Moysey Itkis; Gennadi Luzin; Boris Pereberin	(Norway) Norway; Mauritz Amundsen; Iver Aas; Anker Hagen; Erling Asbjørn Kongshaug; Thore Skredegaard	(Switzerland) Switzerland; Robert Bürchler; Ernst Huber; Lenz E. Ramseier E. Schmid E.
1958	(Soviet Union) Moscow	(Soviet Union) Soviet Union; Vasily Borisov; Moysey Itkis; Yuri Kudryashov; Marat Niyazov; Viktor Shamburkin	(Hungary) Hungary; Ambrus Balogh; Imre Agoston; János Dosztály; Janos Holup; Sandor Krebs	(Finland) Finland; Pauli Aapeli Janhonen; Esa Einari Kervinen; Mikko Johannes Nordquist; Jorma Tuomas Taitto; Vilho Ilmari Ylönenen
1962	(Egypt) Cairo	United States; Gary Anderson; Tommy Pool; Daniel Bruce Puckel; Verle Franklin Jun. Wright	(Switzerland) Switzerland; August Hollenstein; Kurt Mueller; Hans Schoenenberger; Erwin Vogt	(East Germany) German Democratic Republic; Herbert Golla; Werner Heyn; Manfred Kosert; Joachim Lehnert H.
1966	(West Germany) Wiesbaden	(East Germany) German Democratic Republic; Werner Lippoldt; Guenter Lange; Dieter Munzert; Hartmut Sommer	(Soviet Union) Soviet Union; Alexander Gerasimenok; Vladimir Konyakhin; Valentin Kornev; Marat Niyazov	United States; Gary Anderson; Tommy Pool; Margaret Thompson; Lones Wigger
1970	(United States) Phoenix	United States; David Boyd; John Robert Foster; John Writer; Lones Wigger	(Soviet Union) Soviet Union; Vladimir Agishev; Oleg Lapkin; Vitali Parkhimovitch; Sergei Yermilov	(East Germany) German Democratic Republic; Werner Lippoldt; Dieter Munzert; Hartmut Sommer; Uto Wunderlich
1974	(Switzerland) Thun	United States; Lanny Bassham; Margaret Murdock; Lones Wigger; John Writer	(Soviet Union) Soviet Union; Anatoli Bulgakov; Gennadi Lushikov; Alexander Mitrofanov; Vitali Parkhimovitch	(Hungary) Hungary; Laszlo Dr. Hammerl; Sandor Nagy; Lajos Papp; Ferenc Petrovacz
1978	(South Korea) Seoul	United States; Lanny Bassham; Rod Fitz-Randolph; Edward Etzel; Lones Wigger	(West Germany) Federal Republic of Germany; Gottfried Kustermann; Ulrich Lind; Werner Seibold; Karlheinz Smieszek	(Sweden) Sweden; Sven Johansson; Carl-Erik Oeberg; Esbjoern Svensson; Stefan Thynell
1982	(Venezuela) Caracas	(Soviet Union) Soviet Union; Kirill Ivanov; Vladimir Lvov; Alexander Mitrofanov; Viktor Vlasov	(Norway) Norway; Arnt-Olav Haugland; Terje Melbye-Hansen; Harald Stenvaag; Geir Skirbekk	(United Kingdom) Great Britain; Alister Allan; Malcolm Cooper; Barry Dagger; John Davis
1986	(East Germany) Suhl	(Czechoslovakia) Czechoslovakia; Milan Bakeš; Petr Kůrka; Pavel Soukeník	France; Jean-Pierre Amat; Pascal Bessy; Michel Bury	(Soviet Union) Soviet Union; Kirill Ivanov; Hrachya Petikyan; Viktor Vlasov
1990	(Soviet Union) Moscow	(Soviet Union) Soviet Union; Viatcheslav Botchkarev; Kirill Ivanov; Hrachya Petikyan	(Czechoslovakia) Czechoslovakia; Milan Bakeš; Petr Kůrka; Miroslav Varga	France; Jean-Pierre Amat; Pascal Bessy; Michel Bury

== 50 metre free rifle kneeling 40 shots, men ==
This event was held at World Championships in 1930–1990.

Year	Place	Gold	Silver	Bronze
1930	(Belgium) Antwerp	Emmet Oscar Swanson (USA)	Kullervo Leskinen (FIN)	Einari Oksa (FIN)
1931	(Poland) Lwów	Kullervo Leskinen (FIN)	Bertil Vilhelm Rönnmark (SWE)	Johannes Groenli (NOR)
1933	(Spain) Granada	Osmo Rantala (FIN)	Kullervo Leskinen (FIN)	Charles Coquelin de Lisle (FRA)
1935	(Italy) Rome	Gustav Lokotar (EST)	Ernst Rull (EST)	Willy Røgeberg (NOR)
1937	(Finland) Helsinki	Harald Kivioja (EST)	Jacques Louis Mazoyer (FRA)	Ernst Tellenbach (SUI)
1939	(Switzerland) Lucerne	Laszlo Buday (HUN)	Bertil Vilhelm Rönnmark (SWE)	Kurt Johansson (SWE)
1947	(Sweden) Stockholm	Johan Hunæs (NOR)	Otto Horber (SUI)	Thore Skredegaard (NOR)
1949	(Argentina) Buenos Aires	Robert Bürchler (SUI)	Werner Jakober (SUI)	Olavi Elo (FIN)
1952	(Norway) Oslo	Sven Halinoja (FIN)	Johan Hunæs (NOR)	Emmet Oscar Swanson (USA)
1954	(Venezuela) Caracas	Anatoli Bogdanov (URS)	Vasily Borisov (URS)	Moysey Itkis (URS)
1958	(Soviet Union) Moscow	Vilho Ilmari Ylönenen (FIN)	Marat Niyazov (URS)	François Jacques Florentin Lafortune (BEL)
1962	(Egypt) Cairo	Karl Wenk (FRG)	Marat Niyazov (URS)	Ole Christian Hviid Jensen (DEN)
1966	(West Germany) Wiesbaden	Vladimir Konyakhin (URS)	Marat Niyazov (URS)	Michiel Victor (RSA)
1970	(United States) Phoenix	Erich Burgin (SUI)	Wolfram Sen. Waibel (AUT)	Sven Johansson (SWE)
1974	(Switzerland) Thun	Vitali Parkhimovitch (URS)	Jaakko Minkkinen (FIN)	John Writer (USA)
1978	(South Korea) Seoul	John Churchill (GBR)	Charles Jermann (SUI)	Barry Dagger (GBR)
1982	(Venezuela) Caracas	Peter Heinz (FRG)	Vladimir Lvov (URS)	Alexander Mitrofanov (URS)
1986	(East Germany) Suhl	Pavel Soukeník (TCH)	Juha Hirvi (FIN)	Stefan Loevbom (SWE)
1990	(Soviet Union) Moscow	Hubert Bichler (FRG)	Viatcheslav Botchkarev (URS)	Hrachya Petikyan (URS)

== 50 metre free rifle kneeling 40 shots, men team ==
This event was held at World Championships in 1930–1990.

Year	Place	Gold	Silver	Bronze
1930	(Belgium) Antwerp	United States; William Bruce; Frank Parsons; Harry Renshaw; Russell Seitzinger; Emmet Oscar Swanson	(Finland) Finland; Lars Klaerich; Kullervo Leskinen; Sven Oscar Lindgren; Einari Oksa; Niilo Talvenheimo	(Denmark) Denmark; Niels Hansen Ditlev Larsen; Krolykke G. Erhard Kubstrup; Pedersen P. J. Mygard
1931	(Poland) Lwów	(Finland) Finland; Johan Albert Ravila; Sven Oscar Lindgren; Einari Oksa; Niilo Talvenheimo; Kullervo Leskinen	(Norway) Norway; Mauritz Amundsen; Sverre Glomnes; Johannes Groenli; Reidar Muslie; Willy Røgeberg	(Sweden) Sweden; Gustaf Emil Andersson; Olle Ericsson I. Tage Eriksson; Nils Persson; Bertil Vilhelm Rönnmark
1933	(Spain) Granada	(Finland) Finland; Kullervo Leskinen; Viljo Leskinen; Einari Oksa; Osmo Rantala; Sven Oscar Lindgren	(Sweden) Sweden; Gary Anderson; Olle Ericsson I. Bertil Vilhelm Rönnmark; Nils Persson; Ivar Wester K.	France; Charles Coquelin de Lisle; Raymond Durand; Marcel Fitoussi; Lucien Genot; Leveugle
1935	(Italy) Rome	(Estonia) Estonia; Villem Jaanson; Elmar Kivistik; Gustav Lokotar; Endel Rikand; Ernst Rull	France; Marcel Bouchez; Marcel Bonin; Raymond Durand; Lucien Genot; Jacques Louis Mazoyer	(Sweden) Sweden; Tage Eriksson; Olle Ericsson I. Erland Koch; Karl August Larsson; Bertil Vilhelm Rönnmark
1937	(Finland) Helsinki	(Estonia) Estonia; Elmar Kivistik; Harald Kivioja; Gustav Lokotar; August Liivik; Ernst Rull	(Switzerland) Switzerland; Marcio Ciocco; Gustav Eichelberger; Otto Horber; Ernst Tellenbach; Karl Zimmermann	France; Marcel Bonin; Raymond Durand; Marcel Fitoussi; Lucien Genot; Jacques Louis Mazoyer
1939	(Switzerland) Lucerne	(Estonia) Estonia; Elmar Kivistik; Harald Kivioja; August Liivik; Gustav Lokotar; Karl Kuebar	(Germany); Walter Gehmann; Erich Spoerer; Albert Sigl; Karl Steigelmann; Sturm R.	(Norway) Norway; Mauritz Amundsen; Johan Hunæs; Halvor Kongsjorden; Willy Røgeberg; Thore Skredegaard
1947	(Sweden) Stockholm	(Switzerland) Switzerland; Robert Bürchler; Marcio Ciocco; Guenig E. Otto Horber; Schlapbach L.	(Norway) Norway; Johan Hunæs; Halvor Kongsjorden; Willy Røgeberg; Thore Skredegaard; Odd Sannes	(Sweden) Sweden; Isac Holger Erben; Walther Sigfrid Fröstell; Jonas Jonsson; Harry Johansson; Kurt Johansson
1952	(Norway) Oslo	(Sweden) Sweden; Uno Hilding Berg; Walther Sigfrid Fröstell; Kurt Johansson; Lindquist T. Wiberg C.	(Switzerland) Switzerland; Robert Bürchler; Emil Gruenig; Otto Horber; August Hollenstein; Ernst Huber	(Norway) Norway; Mauritz Amundsen; Johan Hunæs; Erling Asbjørn Kongshaug; Thore Skredegaard; Odd Sannes
1954	(Venezuela) Caracas	(Soviet Union) Soviet Union; Anatoli Bogdanov; Vasily Borisov; Moysey Itkis; Grigori Kupko; Boris Pereberin	(Sweden) Sweden; Isac Holger Erben; Walther Sigfrid Fröstell; Kurt Johansson; Anders Helge Kvissberg; Nils Johan Sundberg	(Norway) Norway; Iver Aas; Mauritz Amundsen; Anker Hagen; Erling Asbjørn Kongshaug; Thore Skredegaard
1958	(Soviet Union) Moscow	(Soviet Union) Soviet Union; Vasily Borisov; Moysey Itkis; Yuri Kudryashov; Marat Niyazov; Boris Pereberin	United States; James Carter; Herr J. Daniel Bruce Puckel; Gordon Taras; Verle Franklin Jun. Wright	(Czechoslovakia) Czechoslovakia; Ladislav Cerveny; Otakar Hořínek; Karel Perman; Josef Sulovsky; Jaroslav Sulovsky
1962	(Egypt) Cairo	(Soviet Union) Soviet Union; Vladimir Chuian; Eduard Jarosh; Yevgeny Knyazev; Marat Niyazov	(West Germany) Federal Republic of Germany; Hans Werner Harbeck; Bernd Klingner; Karl Wenk; Klaus Zähringer	United States; Gary Anderson; James Enoch Hill; Daniel Bruce Puckel; Tommy Pool
1966	(West Germany) Wiesbaden	United States; Gary Anderson; Tommy Pool; Margaret Thompson; Lones Wigger	(Soviet Union) Soviet Union; Alexander Gerasimenok; Vladimir Konyakhin; Valentin Kornev; Marat Niyazov	(Poland) Poland; Henryk Górski; Janusz Kalmus; Jerzy Nowicki; Andrzej Trajda
1970	(United States) Phoenix	(Soviet Union) Soviet Union; Vladimir Agishev; Oleg Lapkin; Vitali Parkhimovitch; Sergei Yermilov	United States; David Boyd; John Robert Foster; Lones Wigger; John Writer	(West Germany) Federal Republic of Germany; Peter Kohnke; Bernd Klingner; Gottfried Kustermann; Klaus Zähringer
1974	(Switzerland) Thun	(Soviet Union) Soviet Union; Anatoli Bulgakov; Gennadi Lushikov; Alexander Mitrofanov; Vitali Parkhimovitch	United States; Lanny Bassham; Margaret Murdock; Lones Wigger; John Writer	(West Germany) Federal Republic of Germany; Bernd Klingner; Gottfried Kustermann; Wolfgang Ruehle; Klaus Zähringer
1978	(South Korea) Seoul	(United Kingdom) Great Britain; John Churchill; Malcolm Cooper; Barry Dagger; Alan Glasby	(West Germany) Federal Republic of Germany; Gottfried Kustermann; Ulrich Lind; Werner Seibold; Karlheinz Smieszek	(Austria) Austria; Gerhard Krimbacher; Kurt Rauner; Beat Stadler; Wolfram Sen. Waibel
1982	(Venezuela) Caracas	(United Kingdom) Great Britain; Alister Allan; Malcolm Cooper; Barry Dagger; John Davis	(Soviet Union) Soviet Union; Kirill Ivanov; Vladimir Lvov; Alexander Mitrofanov; Viktor Vlasov	United States; Michael Anti; Ray Carter; Rod Fitz-Randolph; Lones Wigger
1986	(East Germany) Suhl	(Soviet Union) Soviet Union; Kirill Ivanov; Hrachya Petikyan; Viktor Vlasov	(Czechoslovakia) Czechoslovakia; Milan Bakeš; Petr Kůrka; Pavel Soukeník	(East Germany) German Democratic Republic; Hellfried Heilfort; Frank Rettkowski; Andreas Wolfram
1990	(Soviet Union) Moscow	(West Germany) Federal Republic of Germany; Hubert Bichler; Thomas Brocher; Peter Heinz	(Soviet Union) Soviet Union; Viatcheslav Botchkarev; Kirill Ivanov; Hrachya Petikyan	(Socialist Federal Republic of Yugoslavia) Yugoslavia; Rajmond Debevec; Goran Maksimović; Nemanja Mirosavljev

== 50 metre standard rifle 3X20 shots, men ==
This event was held at World Championships in 1966–1974.

Year	Place	Gold	Silver	Bronze
1966	(West Germany) Wiesbaden	Donald Adams (USA)	Gary Anderson (USA)	Hartmut Sommer (GDR)
1970	(United States) Phoenix	John Writer (USA)	Andrzej Sieledcow (POL)	Uto Wunderlich (GDR)
1974	(Switzerland) Thun	Hermann Sauer (RSA)	Uto Wunderlich (GDR)	Helge Edvin Anshushaug (NOR)

== 50 metre standard rifle 3X20 shots, men team ==
This event was held at World Championships in 1966–1974.

Year	Place	Gold	Silver	Bronze
1966	(West Germany) Wiesbaden	United States; Donald Adams; Gary Anderson; John Robert Foster; Bill Krilling	(Soviet Union) Soviet Union; Alexander Gerasimenok; Vladimir Konyakhin; Yuri Kudryashov; Ludwig Lustberg	(East Germany) German Democratic Republic; Werner Lippoldt; Guenter Lange; Joachim Lehnert H. Hartmut Sommer
1970	(United States) Phoenix	(Soviet Union) Soviet Union; Vladimir Agishev; Oleg Lapkin; Boris Melnik; Vitali Parkhimovitch	United States; Lanny Bassham; David Boyd; John Writer; Lones Wigger	(Czechoslovakia) Czechoslovakia; Karel Bulan; Petr Kovářík; Rudolf Pojer; Antonín Schwarz
1974	(Switzerland) Thun	(Soviet Union) Soviet Union; Gennadi Lushikov; Vitali Parkhimovitch; Sergei Rainikov; Alexander Mitrofanov	United States; Lanny Bassham; David Cramer; David Kimes; John Writer	(Norway) Norway; Helge Edvin Anshushaug; Ole Oekdal; Harald Stenvaag; Svien Sotberg

== 100 metre running deer single shots, men ==
This event was held at World Championships in 1929–1962.

Year	Place	Gold	Silver	Bronze
1929	(Sweden) Stockholm	Otto Martin Olsen (NOR)	Bror Nilsson (SWE)	Martti Johannes Liuttula (FIN)
1931	(Poland) Lwów	John Keith Boles (USA)	Otto Martin Olsen (NOR)	Rolf Bergersen (NOR)
1937	(Finland) Helsinki	Rolf Bergersen (NOR)	Herman Pyk (SWE)	Hans Aasnæs (NOR)
1947	(Sweden) Stockholm	Per Olaf Skoeldberg (SWE)	Yrjoe Miettinen (FIN)	Birger Thorleif Kockgaard (SWE)
1949	(Argentina) Buenos Aires	John Harry Larsen (NOR)	Rolf Bergersen (NOR)	Birger Thorleif Kockgaard (SWE)
1952	(Norway) Oslo	John Harry Larsen (NOR)	Rolf Bergersen (NOR)	Karl Bokman (SWE)
1954	(Venezuela) Caracas	Vitaly Romanenko (URS)	Rolf Bergersen (NOR)	Nikolai Prosorovsky (URS)
1958	(Soviet Union) Moscow	Jogan Nikitin (URS)	Vitaly Romanenko (URS)	James Davis (USA)
1961	(Norway) Oslo	Loyd Crow (USA)	Vitaly Romanenko (URS)	Ludwig Lustberg (URS)
1962	(Egypt) Cairo	Oleg Zakurenov (URS)	John Robert Foster (USA)	Rune Flodmann (SWE)

== 100 metre running deer single shots, men team ==
This event was held at World Championships in 1929–1962.

Year	Place	Gold	Silver	Bronze
1929	(Sweden) Stockholm	(Sweden) Sweden; Otto Hultberg F. Fredric Landelius P. Bror Nilsson; Bill Modin	(Norway) Norway; Thorstein Arthur Johansen; Ole Andreas Lilloe-Olsen; Einar Liberg; Otto Martin Olsen	(Finland) Finland; Lennart Vilhelm Hannelius; Martti Johannes Liuttula; Magnus Wegelius
1931	(Poland) Lwów	(Poland) Poland; Tadeusz Baranski; Jerzy Podoski; Stanislaw Lewinski; Kazimierz Zaleski	(Norway) Norway; Hans Aasnæs; Rolf Bergersen; Otto Martin Olsen; Martin Stenersen	
1952	(Norway) Oslo	(Norway) Norway; Birger Bühring-Andersen; Rolf Bergersen; Hans Aasnæs; John Harry Larsen	(Sweden) Sweden; Birger Thorleif Kockgaard; Hans Liljedahl; Max Arvid Paul Olle Mirowsky; Per Olaf Skoeldberg	(Finland) Finland; Koskenmies M. Martti Johannes Liuttula; Tauno Maeki; Yrjoe Miettinen
1954	(Venezuela) Caracas	(Soviet Union) Soviet Union; Dmitriy Bobrun; Vasilij Onishchenko; Nikolai Prosorovsky; Vitaly Romanenko	(Norway) Norway; Birger Bühring-Andersen; Rolf Bergersen; Brude O. John Harry Larsen	(Sweden) Sweden; Bengt Austrin; Bohman A. Erdman G. Olle Skoeldberg
1958	(Soviet Union) Moscow	(Soviet Union) Soviet Union; Ludwig Lustberg; Jogan Nikitin; Vitaly Romanenko; Oleg Zakurenov	United States; James Davis; Joseph Deckert; Harry Lucker; Wentworth R.	(Sweden) Sweden; Bohman A. Rune Flodmann; Sven Johansson; Schullstroem B.
1961	(Norway) Oslo	(Soviet Union) Soviet Union; Vladimir Linnikov; Ludwig Lustberg; Jogan Nikitin; Vitaly Romanenko	United States; Loyd Crow; Joseph Deckert; John Robert Foster; Willis Powell	(Sweden) Sweden; Halvarsson H. Stig Johansson; Karl Karlsson; Schullstroem B.
1962	(Egypt) Cairo	(Soviet Union) Soviet Union; Vitaly Romanenko; Igor Nyesterov; Jogan Nikitin; Oleg Zakurenov	United States; John Robert Foster; Willis Powell; Skarpness N. Torbush J.	(Sweden) Sweden; Rune Flodmann; Halvarsson H. Stig Johansson; Karl Karlsson

== 100 metre running deer double shots, men ==
This event was held at World Championships in 1929–1962.

Year	Place	Gold	Silver	Bronze
1929	(Sweden) Stockholm	Otto Hultberg F. (SWE)	Otto Martin Olsen (NOR)	Bill Modin (SWE)
1931	(Poland) Lwów	John Keith Boles (USA)	Rolf Bergersen (NOR)	Martti Johannes Liuttula (FIN)
1937	(Finland) Helsinki	Olle Skoeldberg (SWE)	Hans Aasnæs (NOR)	Herman Pyk (SWE)
1947	(Sweden) Stockholm	Hans Aasnæs (NOR)	Hans Liljedahl (SWE)	Birger Thorleif Kockgaard (SWE)
1949	(Argentina) Buenos Aires	Hans Aasnæs (NOR)	Per Olaf Skoeldberg (SWE)	Birger Bühring-Andersen (NOR)
1952	(Norway) Oslo	John Harry Larsen (NOR)	Bengt Austrin (SWE)	Karl Bokman (SWE)
1954	(Venezuela) Caracas	Dmitriy Bobrun (URS)	Vitaly Romanenko (URS)	Vladimir Sevriugin (URS)
1958	(Soviet Union) Moscow	Joseph Deckert (USA)	Rune Flodmann (SWE)	Harry Lucker (USA)
1961	(Norway) Oslo	John Robert Foster (USA)	Vladimir Linnikov (URS)	Ludwig Lustberg (URS)
1962	(Egypt) Cairo	Oleg Zakurenov (URS)	Jogan Nikitin (URS)	Willis Powell (USA)

== 100 metre running deer double shots, men team ==
This event was held at World Championships in 1929–1962.

Year	Place	Gold	Silver	Bronze
1929	(Sweden) Stockholm	(Norway) Norway; Halvard Angaard; Thorstein Arthur Johansen; Einar Liberg; Otto Martin Olsen	(Sweden) Sweden; Otto Hultberg F. Fredric Landelius P. Bill Modin; Bror Nilsson	(Finland) Finland; Lennart Vilhelm Hannelius; Martti Johannes Liuttula; Magnus Wegelius
1931	(Poland) Lwów	(Norway) Norway; Rolf Bergersen; Hans Aasnæs; Otto Martin Olsen; Harald Natvig	(Poland) Poland; Tadeusz Baranski; Stanislaw Lewinski; Jerzy Podoski; Kazimierz Zaleski	
1952	(Norway) Oslo	(Norway) Norway; Birger Bühring-Andersen; Hans Aasnæs; Rolf Bergersen; John Harry Larsen	(Finland) Finland; Koskenmies M. Martti Johannes Liuttula; Tauno Maeki; Yrjoe Miettinen	(Sweden) Sweden; Bengt Austrin; Birger Thorleif Kockgaard; Max Arvid Paul Olle Mirowsky; Per Olaf Skoeldberg
1954	(Venezuela) Caracas	(Soviet Union) Soviet Union; Dmitriy Bobrun; Nikolai Prosorovsky; Vitaly Romanenko; Vladimir Sevriugin	(Sweden) Sweden; Bengt Austrin; Bohman A. Erdman G. Olle Skoeldberg	(Norway) Norway; Rolf Bergersen; Brude O. Birger Bühring-Andersen; John Harry Larsen
1958	(Soviet Union) Moscow	(Soviet Union) Soviet Union; Ludwig Lustberg; Jogan Nikitin; Vitaly Romanenko; Oleg Zakurenov	United States; Joseph Deckert; James Davis; Harry Lucker; Wentworth R.	(Sweden) Sweden; Bohman A. Rune Flodmann; Sven Johansson; Schullstroem B.
1961	(Norway) Oslo	(Soviet Union) Soviet Union; Vladimir Linnikov; Ludwig Lustberg; Jogan Nikitin; Vitaly Romanenko	United States; Loyd Crow; John Robert Foster; Willis Powell; Skarpness N.	(Sweden) Sweden; Rune Flodmann; Halvarsson H. Stig Johansson; Karl Karlsson
1962	(Egypt) Cairo	(Soviet Union) Soviet Union; Jogan Nikitin; Igor Nyesterov; Vitaly Romanenko; Oleg Zakurenov	United States; John Robert Foster; Willis Powell; Skarpness N. Torbush J.	(Finland) Finland; Kling P. Piskula M. Penkkimaeki S. Yrjoevuori H.

== 100 metre running deer single shots and double shots, men ==
This event was held at World Championships in 1949.

Year	Place	Gold	Silver	Bronze
1949	(Argentina) Buenos Aires	John Harry Larsen (NOR)	Rolf Bergersen (NOR)	Per Olaf Skoeldberg (SWE)

== 100 metre running deer single shots and double shots, men team ==
This event was held at World Championships in 1949.

Year	Place	Gold	Silver	Bronze
1949	(Argentina) Buenos Aires	(Norway) Norway; Hans Aasnæs; Birger Bühring-Andersen; Rolf Bergersen; Rasmus Lund; John Harry Larsen	(Sweden) Sweden; Birger Thorleif Kockgaard; Hans Liljedahl; Max Arvid Paul Olle Mirowsky; Per Olaf Skoeldberg; Bengt Austrin	(Argentina) Argentina; Durando J. Mella S. Peverelli A. Pereyra J. Schilling M.

== 50 yards and 100 yards rifle prone 30+30 shots, women ==
This event was held at World Championships in 1958.

Year	Place	Gold	Silver	Bronze
1958	(Soviet Union) Moscow	Jelena Donskaja (URS)	Rimma Zelenko (URS)	Iudit Moscu (ROM)

== 50 metre free rifle 3X30 shots, women ==
This event was held at World Championships in 1958–1962.

Year	Place	Gold	Silver	Bronze
1958	(Soviet Union) Moscow	Tamara Lomova (URS)	Jelena Donskaja (URS)	Lajosne Kisgyorgy (HUN)
1962	(Egypt) Cairo	Kira Dolgoborodova (URS)	Jelena Donskaja (URS)	Renate Wischnewski (GDR)

== 50 metre free rifle 3X30 shots, women team ==
This event was held at World Championships in 1958.

Year	Place	Gold	Silver	Bronze
1958	(Soviet Union) Moscow	(Soviet Union) Soviet Union; Jelena Donskaja; Tamara Lomova; Rimma Zelenko	(Hungary) Hungary; Lajosne Kisgyorgy; Oszkarne Kellner; Istvanne Veress	(Czechoslovakia) Czechoslovakia; Jarmila Horackova; Věra Růžičková; Eliska Stara

== 50 metre free rifle prone, women ==
This event was held at World Championships in 1962.

Year	Place	Gold	Silver	Bronze
1962	(Egypt) Cairo	Jelena Donskaja (URS)	Marjorie Dunt (RSA)	Anneliese Goth (FRG)

== 25 metre rapid fire pistol, women ==
Year	Place	Gold	Silver	Bronze
1962	(Egypt) Cairo	Sofia Tiagni (URS)	Nadezhda Yulina (URS)	Gertrude Schernitzauer (USA)

== 25 metre military pistol, women ==
Year	Place	Gold	Silver	Bronze
1962	(Egypt) Cairo	Nadezhda Yulina (URS)	Gail Liberty (USA)	Sofia Tiagni (URS)

== 25 metre standard pistol, women team ==
This event was held at World Championships in 1970.

Year	Place	Gold	Silver	Bronze
1970	(United States) Phoenix	(Australia) Australia; E. Newton; Judy Trim; Gloria Vause	(United States) United States; Sally Carroll; Lucile Chambliss; M. Norkauer	(West Germany) West Germany; Ortrud Feickert; Karin Fitzner; Ruth Kasten

== See also ==
- List of Olympic medalists in shooting
- ISSF Olympic skeet
- ISSF Olympic trap
- List of medalists at the European Shooting Championships
- List of medalists at the European Shotgun Championships
