= Leskinen (surname) =

Leskinen is a Finnish surname. Notable people with the surname include:

- August Leskinen (1876–1952), politician
- Veli Leskinen (1907–1989), footballer
- Viljo Leskinen (1908–1945), sports shooter
- Kullervo Leskinen (1908–1989), sports shooter
- Margit Leskinen (1915–2002), swimmer
- Väinö Leskinen (1917–1972), politician and swimmer
- Juice Leskinen (1950–2006), singer, songwriter and poet
- Pekka Leskinen (born 1954), figure skater
- Petri Leskinen (born 1966), sailor
- Janne Leskinen (born 1971), alpine skier
- Kristi Leskinen (born 1981), freestyle skier
- Ville-Valtteri Leskinen (born 1994), ice hockey player
- Ville Leskinen (born 1995), ice hockey winger
- Otto Leskinen (born 1997), ice hockey player
- Dana Leskinen (born 2001), footballer

Fictional characters

- Alexis Leskinen, a Finnish-American neuroscientist in the Steins;Gate universe.
