= Karu =

Karu may refer to:

Places

- Karu, Estonia
- Karu LGA, Nigeria
  - Karu Urban Area
- Karu Nadu, South West India
- Karu, Ladakh, North India

Languages

- Karu language

People

- Asko Karu (born 1992), Estonian powerlifter and strongman competitor
- Erkki Karu (1887–1935), Finnish film director, screenwriter and producer
- Esko Karu (1946–2003), Canadian skier
- Peeter Karu (1909–1942), Estonian sport shooter
- Karu Jain, Indian cricketer

Media

- Karu (film), a Tamil film directed by A. L. Vijay
- Karu süda (The Heart of the Bear), a 2001 Estonian film
- "Karu", a song by Sentenced from The Funeral Album

== See also ==
- Käru (disambiguation)
