= Erland Koch =

Erland Koch may refer to:

- Erland Koch (German sport shooter) (1867–1945)
- Erland Koch (Swedish sport shooter) (1913–1972)
