= Beyeler =

Beyeler is a surname. Notable people with the surname include:

- Andreas Beyeler (born 1942), Swiss former sports shooter
- Arnie Beyeler (born 1964), American professional baseball coach, former player and manager
- Ernst Beyeler (1921–2010), Swiss art dealer and collector
- Fred Beyeler (born 1965), New Zealand cricketer
- Irene Beyeler (born 1985), Swiss sport shooter
- Otto Beyeler (1926–2004), Swiss cross country skier
- Simon Beyeler (born 1982), Swiss sport shooter
