= Jon Larsen =

Jon Larsen may refer to:

- Jon Larsen (Norwegian musician) (born 1959), Norwegian gypsy jazz guitarist and painter
- Jon Larsen (Danish musician), drummer for the rock band Volbeat
- Jonathan Larsen, American journalist

== See also ==
- John Larsen (disambiguation)
- Jonathan Larson (1960–1996), American composer and playwright
