= Käru (disambiguation) =

Käru may refer to several places in Estonia:

- Käru, small borough in Türi Parish, Järva County
- Käru, Lääne-Viru County, village in Väike-Maarja Parish, Lääne-Viru County
- Käru, Pärnu County, village in Lääneranna Parish, Pärnu County
- Käru Parish, former municipality in Rapla County

== See also ==
- Karu (disambiguation)
