= John Larson (disambiguation) =

John Larson may refer to:

- John Augustus Larson, inventor of the polygraph
- John B. Larson, congressman from Connecticut
- John Larson (journalist), reporter for Dateline NBC

== See also ==
- John Larsson, Swedish Salvationist, and writer and composer of Christian music and hymns
- Jonathan Larson (1960–1996), American composer, lyricist, and playwright
- John Larsen (disambiguation)
