= John Writer =

American sport shooter

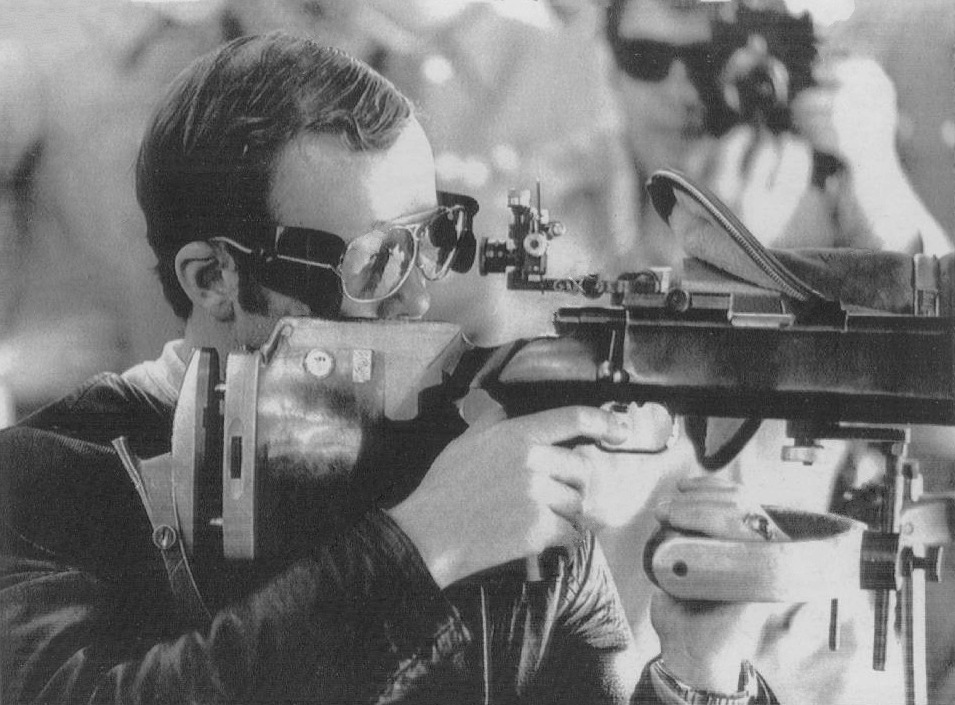
- Writer at the 1972 Olympics

Personal information
- Full name: John Henry Writer
- Born: September 17, 1944 (age 81) Chicago, Illinois, U.S.
- Height: 176 cm (5 ft 9 in)
- Weight: 68 kg (150 lb)

Sport
- Sport: Shooting
- Club: U.S. Army
Medal record
Representing United States
Olympic Games
Gold medal – first place	1972 Munich	50 m rifle 3 positions
Silver medal – second place	1968 Mexico City	50 m rifle 3 positions
Pan American Games
Gold medal – first place	1967 Winnipeg	3×40 3 positions, team
Gold medal – first place	1971 Cali	3×40 3 positions, team
Gold medal – first place	1975 Mexico City	3×40 3 positions, team
World championships
Gold medal – first place	1970 Phoenix	300 m free rifle standing 40 shots, team
Gold medal – first place	1970 Phoenix	50 m free rifle standing 40 shots, team
Gold medal – first place	1970 Phoenix	50 m standard rifle 3×20 shots, ind.
Silver medal – second place	1970 Phoenix	300 m free rifle kneeling 40 shots, team
Bronze medal – third place	1970 Phoenix	300 m free rifle standing 40 shots, ind.
Silver medal – second place	1970 Phoenix	50 m standard rifle 3×20 shots, team
Silver medal – second place	1970 Phoenix	50 m free rifle kneeling 40 shots, team
Bronze medal – third place	1970 Phoenix	50 m free rifle standing 40 shots, ind.
Gold medal – first place	1974 Thun	300 m free rifle standing 40 shots, team
Gold medal – first place	1974 Thun	300 m free rifle prone 40 shots, team
Gold medal – first place	1974 Thun	50 m free rifle standing 40 shots, team
Silver medal – second place	1974 Thun	300 m free rifle kneeling 40 shots, team
Silver medal – second place	1974 Thun	50 m standard rifle 3×20 shots, team
Silver medal – second place	1974 Thun	50 m free rifle kneeling 40 shots, team
Bronze medal – third place	1974 Thun	50 m free rifle kneeling 40 shots, ind.
Silver medal – second place	1974 Thun	10 m air rifle, team

John Henry Writer (born September 17, 1944) is a retired American rifle shooter. He competed in the 50 m three positions event at the 1968 and 1972 Olympics and won a silver and a gold medal, respectively.

Competing for West Virginia, Writer won the U.S. intercollegiate championships in 1964–1966 and the 1967 national title in smallbore rifle, three position. At the 1972 Olympics he set new world records in the total (1,166) and in the standing phase (381). Writer also won multiple medals at the Pan-American Games in 1967–1975 and at the world championships in 1970–1974.

Writer has been inducted into the USA Shooting Hall of fame.
