= Werner Seibold =

German sports shooter

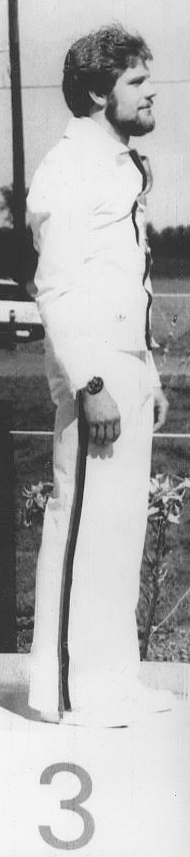
- Seibold at the 1976 Olympics

Personal information
- Born: 24 January 1948 Tegernsee, Germany
- Died: 29 November 2012 (aged 64) Bad Wiessee, Germany
- Height: 174 cm (5 ft 9 in)
- Weight: 78 kg (172 lb)

Sport
- Sport: Shooting
- Event: Small-bore rifle
- Club: SG Bad Wiessee
Medal record
Representing West Germany
Olympic Games
Bronze medal – third place	1976 Montreal	50 m rifle 3 positions
World Championships
Gold medal – first place	1978 Seoul	10 m air rifle, team
Silver medal – second place	1978 Seoul	50 m rifle 3 pos., team
Silver medal – second place	1978 Seoul	50 m rifle prone, team
Silver medal – second place	1978 Seoul	50 m rifle standing, team
Silver medal – second place	1978 Seoul	50 m rifle kneeling, team
Silver medal – second place	1982 Caracas	50 m rifle prone

Werner Seibold (24 January 1948 – 29 November 2012) was a German rifle shooter. He competed at the 1976 and 1984 Olympics and won a bronze medal in 1976, placing 25th in 1984. Seibold won one gold and four silver team medals at the 1978 World Championships.
