= Bob Churchill =

British sport shooter (1939–2015)

- Born: John Robert Churchill; 21 February 1939
- Died: 20 June 2015 (aged 76)
- Occupation: rifle shooter

John Robert Churchill (21 February 1939 – 20 June 2015) was a British three positional small bore rifle shooter, who shot for the Great Britain national team in the 1970s and 1980s. He competed in the 50 metre rifle, three positions event at the 1972 Summer Olympics. At the 1978 Seoul ISSF World Shooting Championships, he was gold medalist for both individual and — alongside Barry Dagger and Malcolm Cooper — the men's team events for the 50m free rifle kneeling 40 shots, kneeling position. For many years, he was a member of the Tunbridge Wells Target Shooting club as well as clubs in Somerset. In 1981, he co-wrote Modern Air Weapon Shooting with Granville Davies. Churchill died on 20 June 2015, aged 76.
