= Olle Ericsson (sport shooter) =

Swedish sport shooter

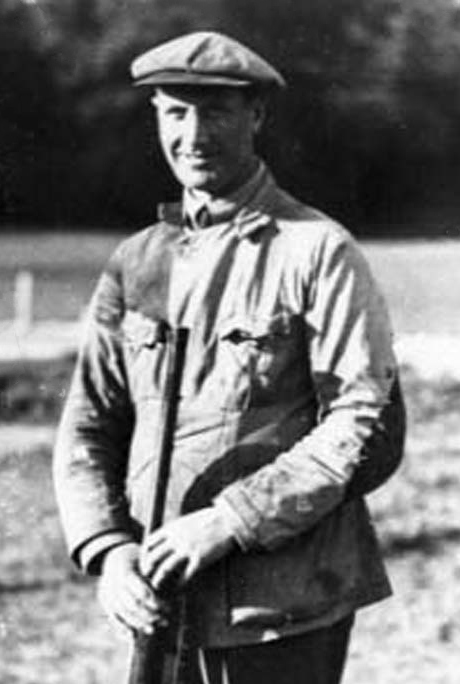

Personal information
- Born: 1 June 1890 Kumla, Sweden
- Died: 25 July 1950 (aged 60) Örebro, Sweden

Sport
- Sport: Sports shooting
- Event: Rifle
- Club: Örebro SF
Medal record
Representing Sweden
Olympic Games
Bronze medal – third place	1920 Antwerp	Team 300 m military rifle, standing
World championships 300 m rifle three positions
Gold medal – first place	1928 Loosduinen	Individual
Silver medal – second place	1927 Rome	Team
Silver medal – second place	1928 Loosduinen	Team
Bronze medal – third place	1927 Rome	Individual
Bronze medal – third place	1929 Stockholm	Team
Bronze medal – third place	1931 Lviv	Individual
Bronze medal – third place	1933 Granada	Team
World championships 300 m rifle
Gold medal – first place	1929 Stockholm	Army rifle, 3×20 shots, ind.
Gold medal – first place	1935 Rome	Army rifle, standing, ind.
Gold medal – first place	1935 Rome	Army rifle, 3×20 shots, team
Silver medal – second place	1928 Loosduinen	Prone 40 shots, ind.
Silver medal – second place	1929 Stockholm	Prone 40 shots, ind.
Silver medal – second place	1929 Stockholm	Army rifle, prone, ind.
Silver medal – second place	1929 Stockholm	Army rifle, standing, ind.
Silver medal – second place	1931 Lviv	Standing 40 shots, ind.
Silver medal – second place	1933 Granada	Standing 40 shots, ind.
Silver medal – second place	1937 Helsinki	Army rifle, prone, team
Bronze medal – third place	1928 Loosduinen	Standing 40 shots, ind.
Bronze medal – third place	1928 Loosduinen	Kneeling 40 shots, ind.
Bronze medal – third place	1935 Rome	Army rifle, 3×20 shots, ind.
Bronze medal – third place	1937 Helsinki	Prone 40 shots, team

Olof Charles "Olle" Ericsson (1 June 1890 – 25 July 1950) was a Swedish sport shooter who competed in the 1920 and 1924 Summer Olympics. In 1920 he won a bronze medal in the team 300 m military rifle, standing competition. In 1924, he also participated in the following events:

- Team free rifle – seventh place
- 600 m free rifle – 14th place
- 50 m rifle, prone – 26th place

Ericsson won several dozen medals in the discontinued 50 and 300 m rifle events at the world championships of 1927–1937.
