= Johannes Vilberg =

Estonian sport shooter

Johannes Vilberg (25 December 1903 – 26 October 1981) was an Estonian sport shooter.

== Life and career ==
He was born in Aleksandri Rural Municipality, Harju County.

He began his shooting career in 1927, coached by Johannes Siir. He won silver and gold medals at the 1935 ISSF World Shooting Championships. He was an 18-times Estonian champion in different shooting disciplines. In 1931–1939 and 1947–1950 he was a member of Estonian national sport shooting team.

== Death ==
He is buried at Tallinn Forest Cemetery.
