= Magne Landrø =

Norwegian sport shooter (1937–2022)

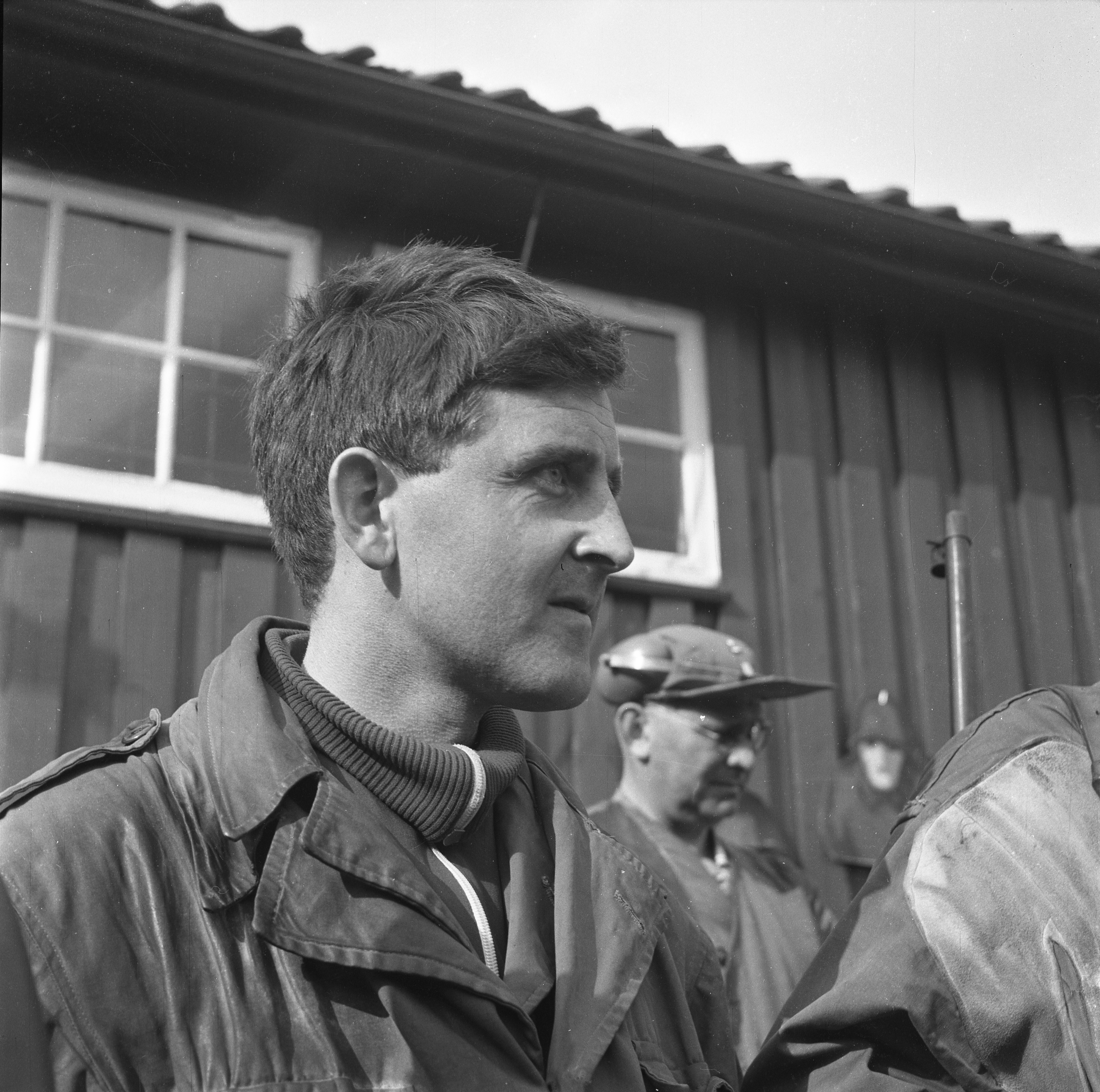
- Landrø in 1967

Personal information
- Born: 24 August 1937 Trondheim, Norway
- Died: 10 March 2022 (aged 84) Lillestrøm, Norway

Sport
- Sport: Sports shooting

Magne Landrø (24 August 1937 – 10 March 2022) was a Norwegian sport shooter. He was born in Trondheim. He competed at the 1960 Summer Olympics in Rome, and at the 1964 Summer Olympics in Tokyo.

His achievements include a gold medal in the 1963 European championships, a World championship silver medal in free rifle in 1966, and a silver medal in 10 m air rifle at the 1969 European Shooting Championships. He further won 26 national titles in various rifle shooting events. He was crowned "Shooting King" at Landsskytterstevnet three times, in 1961, 1976 and 1981.

Landrø died in Lillestrøm on 10 March 2022, at the age of 84.
