= Frank Parsons Jr. =

American sports shooter

Personal information
- Born: January 10, 1906 Baltimore, Maryland, United States
- Died: March 21, 1957 (aged 51)

Sport
- Sport: Sports shooting

Frank Parsons Jr. (January 10, 1906 – March 21, 1957) was an American sports shooter. He competed in the 300 m rifle event at the 1948 Summer Olympics.
