= Ernst-Eduard Rull =

Estonian sport shooter

Ernst-Eduard Rull (18 November 1894 Puhja Parish, Tartu County – 16 September 1986 Tallinn) was an Estonian sport shooter.

1931-1939 and 1945–1950, he was a member of Estonian national team. In total, he won 7 medals at World Shooting Championships: 4 gold, 2 silver and 1 bronze medal.

He died in 1986 in Tallinn. He is buried at Liiva Cemetery.

Since 2008 the Rull-named shooting competition is held annually in Elva.
