= Vladimir Kukk =

Estonian sport shooter

Vladimir Kukk (1 May 1911 – 11 January 1990) was an Estonian sport shooter.

He was born in Riga. In 1931 he graduated from Tondi military school in Tallinn.

He began his shooting career in 1938. He won a bronze medal at 1939 ISSF World Shooting Championships. 1939 he was a member of Estonian national sport shooting team.

During WW II, he was injured at the Battle of Narva front, and reached to Austria. Later he moved to Switzerland. 1953–1973 he was the chairman of Estonian Society in Switzerland (Estonian: Eesti Šveitsi Selts).
