= Webster Wright =

American sports shooter (born 1967)

Personal information
- Born: March 19, 1967 (age 59) Annapolis, Maryland, United States

Sport
- Sport: Sports shooting
Medal record
Representing United States
Pan American Games
Gold medal – first place	1987 Indianapolis	50m rifle 3 positions team
Gold medal – first place	1995 Mar del Plata	50m rifle prone
Bronze medal – third place	1987 Indianapolis	50m rifle prone team

Webster Wright (born March 19, 1967) is an American sports shooter. He competed in the men's 50 metre rifle prone event at the 1988 Summer Olympics.
