= August Liivik =

Estonian sport shooter (1903–1942)

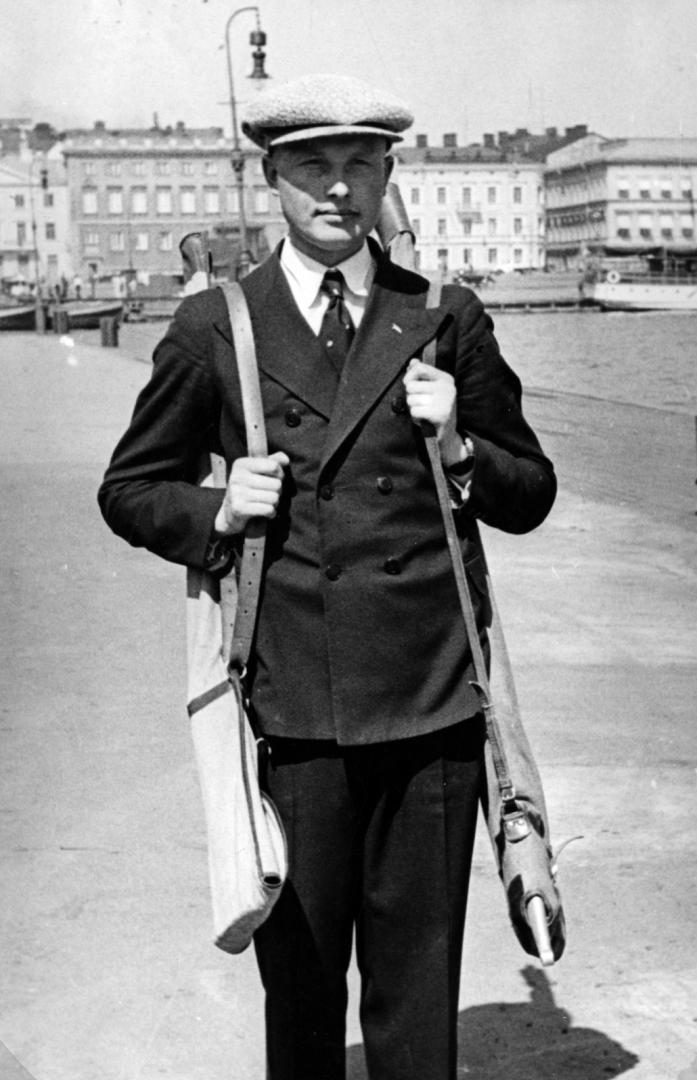
Liivik in Helsinki. 1 July 1936

August Liivik (until 1936 Liiver; 26 January 1903 – 3 May 1942) was an Estonian sport shooter.

== Life ==
He was born in Särevere Rural Municipality, Järva County. In 1927, he graduated from Tondi military school in Tallinn.

He began his shooting career in 1926. In total, he won 18 medals at ISSF World Shooting Championships.

From 1932 to 1939, he was a member of Estonian national shooting team.

Following the Soviet occupation of Estonia during World War II, Liivik was arrested by Soviet authorities on 12 August 1940. He was executed in 1942 in a prison camp in Kirov Oblast, Russian Soviet Federative Socialist Republic.
