= Gustav Lokotar =

Estonian sport shooter

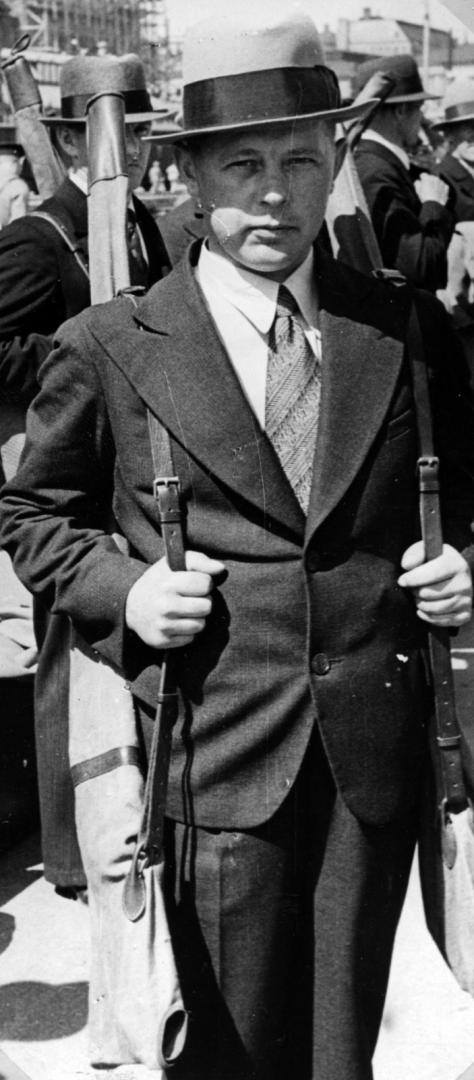
Gustav Lokotar

Gustav Lokotar (12 October 1899 – 12 October 1969) was an Estonian sport shooter. He was born in Kalvi Rural Municipality, Virumaa. In 1921 he graduated from a military school.

He began his shooting career in 1931 under the guidance of Johannes Siir. He won 19 medals at ISSF World Shooting Championships. He was a seven -time Estonian champion in different shooting disciplines. From 1934 to 1939 he was a member of the Estonian national sport shooting team.

He is buried at Pärnamäe Cemetery, Tallinn.
