= Ernst Huber (sport shooter) =

Swiss sports shooter

Personal information
- Nationality: Swiss
- Born: 18 August 1911
- Died: 2006/4/16 Altendorf, Switzerland

Sport
- Sport: Sports shooting

Ernst Huber (born 18 Aug 1911, date of death 16 April 2006) was a Swiss sports shooter. He competed in two events at the 1952 Summer Olympics.
