= Josias Hartmann =

Swiss sport shooter (1893–1982)

Personal information
- Born: 3 April 1893 Graubünden, Switzerland
- Died: 29 October 1982 (aged 89) Geneva, Switzerland

Sport
- Sport: Sports shooting
Medal record
Men's shooting
Representing Switzerland
Olympic Games
Bronze medal – third place	1924 Paris	50 m rifle, prone

Josias Hartmann (3 April 1893 – 29 October 1982) was a Swiss sport shooter who competed in the 1924 Summer Olympics. In 1924, he won the bronze medal in the 50 metre rifle, prone competition.
