= Harald Kivioja =

Estonian sport shooter

Harald Kivioja (born Harald Grünberg; 7 July 1908 – 7 March 1978) was an Estonian sport shooter.

He was born in Nursi Rural Municipality, Võru County.

He began his shooting career in 1928. He won 12 medals at ISSF World Shooting Championships. He was 6-times Estonian champion in different shooting disciplines. 1936–1939 he was a member of Estonian national sport shooting team.

In 1944, he fled the Soviet re-occupation of Estonia to Germany, and in 1946, he emigrated to Sweden. He died in Borås, Sweden in 1978.
