= Osmo Ala-Honkola =

Finnish sports shooter (1939–2020)

Personal information
- Full name: Osmo Juhani Ala-Honkola
- Born: 12 May 1939 Kuortane, Finland
- Died: 14 November 2020 (aged 81) Vaasa, Finland

Sport
- Sport: Sports shooting

Osmo Juhani Ala-Honkola (12 May 1939 – 14 November 2020) was a Finnish sports shooter. He competed at the 1968 Summer Olympics and the 1972 Summer Olympics.
