= Raymond Durand (sport shooter) =

French sports shooter

Personal information
- Born: 28 January 1894 Langres, France
- Died: 26 November 1977 (aged 83) Fontaine-lès-Dijon, France

Sport
- Sport: Sports shooting

Raymond Durand (28 January 1894 – 26 November 1977) was a French sports shooter. He competed in the 50 m rifle event at the 1936 Summer Olympics.
