= John Larsen =

John Larsen may refer to:

- John Larsen (sport shooter, born 1913) (1913–1989), Norwegian rifle shooter and Olympic gold medalist
- John H. Larsen Jr. (born 1943), Norwegian sports shooter, son of the Olympic medalist
- John Larsen (footballer) (born 1962), Danish former footballer
- John Larsen (rower) (born 1943), Canadian Olympic rower

== See also ==
- Jon Larsen (disambiguation)
- John Larson (disambiguation)
- Jack Larsen (disambiguation)
