= Theo Ditzler =

Swiss sports shooter

Personal information
- Born: 9 August 1936
- Died: 27 January 2014 (aged 77)

Sport
- Sport: Sports shooting

Theo Ditzler (9 August 1936 – 27 January 2014) was a Swiss sports shooter. He competed in the 50 metre rifle, prone event at the 1972 Summer Olympics.
