= Karl Zimmermann (sport shooter) =

Swiss sport shooter

Personal information
- Nationality: Swiss
- Born: 19 October 1894
- Died: 1 August 1986 (aged 91)

Sport
- Country: Switzerland
- Sport: Shooting
Medal record
Event	1st	2nd	3rd
World Championships (individual)	19	9	13
World Championships (team)	11	8	7
Total	30	17	20

Karl Zimmermannn (19 October 1894 – 1 August 1986) was a Swiss sports shooter who won 42 medals from 1921 to 1947, including 19 gold, at the World Shooting Championships.

== Biography ==
He never took part in the Olympic Games.

== See also ==
- World Shooting Championship Multiple Medallist
