= Ulrich Sarbach =

Swiss sports shooter

Personal information
- Nationality: Swiss
- Born: 21 April 1954 (age 70)

Sport
- Sport: Sports shooting

Ulrich Sarbach (born 21 April 1954) is a Swiss sports shooter. He competed in two events at the 1984 Summer Olympics.
