= Jacques Mazoyer =

French sports shooter

Personal information
- Born: 12 May 1910 Mahajanga, Madagascar
- Died: 11 October 2003 (aged 93)

Sport
- Country: France
- Sport: Sports shooting

Jacques Mazoyer (12 May 1910 – 11 October 2003) was a French sports shooter. He competed at the 1936, 1948, 1952 and 1956 Summer Olympics.
