= Ulrich Lind =

German sports shooter

Olympic medal record

Shooting

Representing West Germany
Silver medal – second place	1976 Montreal	50 m rifle prone

Ulrich Lind (born 4 November 1942 in Heilbronn) is a German former sport shooter who competed in the 1976 Summer Olympics, the 1984 Summer Olympics, and the 1988 Summer Olympics.
