= Jussi Nordqvist =

Finnish sport shooter

Personal information
- Born: 27 May 1917 Vyborg, Russia
- Died: 15 August 1989 (aged 72) Pori, Finland

Sport
- Sport: Sports shooting

Jussi Nordqvist (27 May 1917 – 15 August 1989) was a Finnish sports shooter. He competed in the 50 metre rifle, prone event at the 1960 Summer Olympics.
