= Rudolf Pojer =

Czech sport shooter

Personal information
- Born: 27 March 1947 (age 79) Znojmo, Czechoslovakia

Sport
- Sport: Sport shooting

Rudolf Pojer (born 27 March 1947) is a Czech former sport shooter. He competed at the 1968 Summer Olympics and the 1972 Summer Olympics.
