= Alfred Kukk =

Estonian sport shooter

Alfred Kukk (4 February 1906 – 31 October 1981) was an Estonian sport shooter.

He was born in Otepää. In 1928 he graduated from a war school.

He began his shooting career in 1929. He won three gold medals at 1937 ISSF World Shooting Championships. He was multiple-times Estonian champion in different shooting disciplines. 1931–1939 he was a member of Estonian national sport shooting team.

1944–1954 he was arrested because of its alleged anti-Soviet activity in Red Army.
