= Walter Lienhard =

Swiss sports shooter (1890–1973)

Personal information
- Born: 15 May 1890 Olten, Switzerland
- Died: 2 June 1973 (aged 83)

Sport
- Sport: Sports shooting

Walter Lienhard (15 May 1890 – 2 June 1973) was a Swiss sports shooter. He competed at the 1920, 1924 and the 1948 Summer Olympics. Lienhard died on 2 June 1973, at the sage of 83.
