= Uto Wunderlich =

German sports shooter

Personal information
- Born: 27 January 1946 (age 80) Leipzig, Germany

Sport
- Sport: Sports shooting

Uto Wunderlich (born 27 January 1946) is a German former sports shooter. He competed at the 1968 Summer Olympics and the 1972 Summer Olympics for East Germany.
