= Martin Truttmann =

Swiss sports shooter

Personal information
- Born: 16 January 1944 (age 82)

Sport
- Sport: Sports shooting

Martin Truttmann (born 16 January 1944) is a Swiss former sports shooter. He competed in two events at the 1972 Summer Olympics.
