= Enrique Claverol =

Spanish sports shooter

Personal information
- Nationality: Spanish
- Born: 3 June 1965 (age 59); Barcelona, Spain

Sport
- Sport: Sports shooting

Enrique Claverol (born 3 June 1965) is a Spanish sports shooter. He competed in two events at the 1992 Summer Olympics.
