= Petr Kovářík =

Czech sport shooter

Personal information
- Born: 21 May 1945 (age 81) Kolín, Czechoslovakia

Sport
- Sport: Sport shooting

Petr Kovářík (born 21 May 1945) is a Czech former sport shooter. He competed at the 1972 Summer Olympics and the 1976 Summer Olympics.
