= Karel Bulan =

Czech sport shooter

Personal information
- Born: 14 January 1940 (age 86) Dolní Staňkov, Protectorate of Bohemia and Moravia

Sport
- Sport: Sport shooting
Medal record
World Championships
Gold medal – first place	1974 Thun	50 m rifle prone
Bronze medal – third place	1970 Phoenix	300 m team rifle three positions
Bronze medal – third place	1974 Thun	50 m team rifle prone
Bronze medal – third place	1970 Phoenix	50 m team standard rifle 3X20 shots
Bronze medal – third place	1974 Thun	300 m team standard rifle
Bronze medal – third place	1974 Thun	300 m team free rifle standing 40 shots

Karel Bulan (born 14 January 1940) is a Czech former sport shooter. He competed at the 1972 Summer Olympics and the 1976 Summer Olympics.
