= Odd Sannes =

Norwegian sport shooter (1922–1999)

Personal information
- Born: 3 August 1922 Oslo, Norway
- Died: 24 March 1999 (aged 76) Oslo, Norway

Sport
- Sport: Sports shooting

Odd Sannes (3 August 1922 – 24 March 1999) was a Norwegian Olympic sport shooter and World Champion.

He became World Champion in 1947. He competed in the 300 m rifle event at the 1948 Summer Olympics in London, placing 15th.
