= Eduard Seren =

Estonian sport shooter

Eduard Seren (after 1937 Saarepere; 23 May 1900 – 25 July 1941) was an Estonian sport shooter.

He was born in Rae Rural Municipality. He participated in Estonian War of Independence. In 1927 he graduated from a military school.

He began his shooting career in 1929. In total, he won 3 medals at ISSF World Shooting Championships. In 1937 he won Estonian championships. 1934–1937 he was a member of Estonian national shooting team.

He died in 1941, being one of the leaders of Forest Brothers.
