= Birger Bühring-Andersen =

Norwegian sport shooter (1907–2001)

Personal information
- Born: 27 March 1907 Oslo, Norway
- Died: 21 January 2001 (aged 93) Oslo, Norway

Sport
- Sport: Sports shooting

Birger Bühring-Andersen (27 March 1907 – 21 January 2001) was a Norwegian sport shooter. He was born in Oslo. He competed at the 1948 Summer Olympics in London, where he placed 8th in the 25 metre rapid fire pistol.
