= Karl August Larsson =

Swedish sports shooter

Personal information
- Born: 10 June 1906 Stockholm, Sweden
- Died: 31 May 1971 (aged 64) Stockholm, Sweden

Sport
- Sport: Sports shooting

Karl August Larsson (10 June 1906 – 31 May 1971) was a Swedish sports shooter. He competed at the 1932 Summer Olympics and 1936 Summer Olympics.
