= Leonhard Viljus =

Estonian sport shooter

Leonhard Viljus (28 March 1904 – 17 January 1970) was an Estonian sport shooter.

He was born in Kokora Rural Municipality. In 1927 he graduated from a military school.

He won 4 medals at ISSF World Shooting Championships. He was 5-times Estonian champion in different shooting disciplines. 1933–1939 he was a member of Estonian national sport shooting team.

During WW II he fought in Wehrmacht. In 1942 he got severely injured at Stalingrad.

In 1943, when Otto Skorzeny began forming a squad in Germany to free the imprisoned Italian Prime Minister Benito Mussolini, Leonhard Viljus was selected to join the group, along with a few other Estonians.

1944 he returned to Estonia. Later he worked at Nõmmküla sovkhoz.
