= Endel Rikand =

Estonian sport shooter

Endel Rikand (9 April 1906 – 17 August 1944) was an Estonian sport shooter.

He was born in Riga. In 1926 he graduated from State Industry School (Estonian: Riigi Tööstuskool).

He began his shooting career in 1932. He won 4 medals at ISSF World Shooting Championships. He was two-times Estonian champion in different shooting disciplines. 1934–1939 he was a member of Estonian national sport shooting team.

1943–1944 he participated on Continuation War in Finland. He died in 1944 in a battle near Narva.
