= Marcel Fitoussi =

French sports shooter

Personal information
- Born: 31 October 1898 Tunis, Tunisia
- Died: 22 January 1992 (aged 93) Aix-en-Provence, France

Sport
- Sport: Sports shooting

Marcel Jean Elie Fitoussi (31 October 1898 – 22 January 1992) was a French sports shooter. He competed in the 50 m rifle event at the 1936 Summer Olympics.
