= Juhani Laakso =

Finnish sports shooter

Personal information
- Born: 27 April 1942 Sysmä, Finland
- Died: 1 June 2014 (aged 72) Hamina, Finland

Sport
- Sport: Sports shooting

Juhani Laakso (27 April 1942 – 1 June 2014) was a Finnish sports shooter. He competed in the 300 metre rifle event at the 1968 Summer Olympics.
