= Eugeniusz Pędzisz =

Polish sports shooter

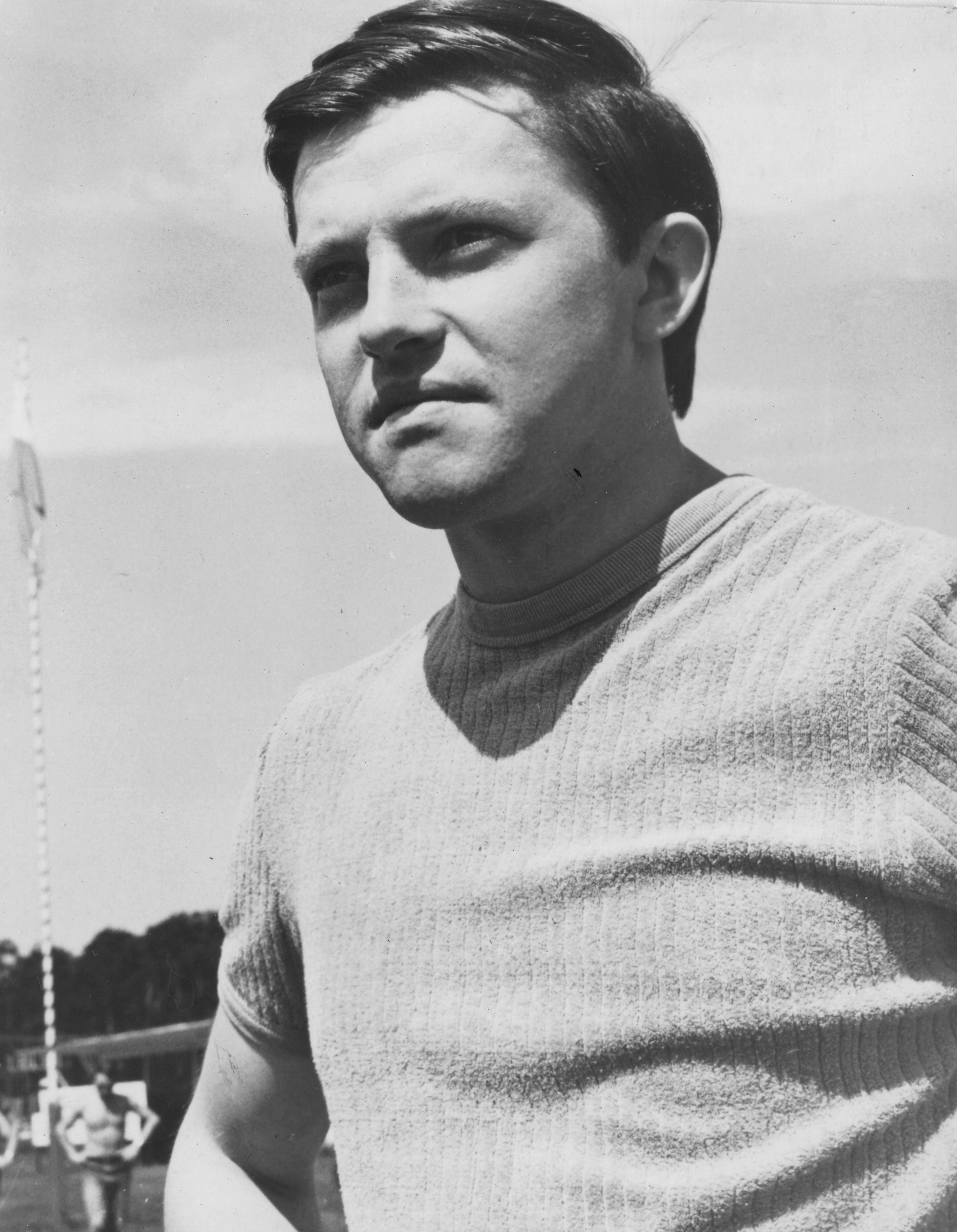
- Eugeniusz Pędzisz in 1974

Personal information
- Born: 21 February 1946 (age 80) Zielona Góra, Poland

Sport
- Sport: Sports shooting

Eugeniusz Pędzisz (born 21 February 1946) is a Polish former sports shooter. He competed at the 1968, 1972, 1976 and the 1980 Summer Olympics.
