= Heinrich Silber =

Estonian sport shooter

Heinrich Silber (1938–1947 Hendrik Sillapere; 8 October 1900 – 4 May 1959) was an Estonian sport shooter. He was born in Tallinn. He participated on Estonian War of Independence. From 1921 to 1926 he studied at the University of Tartu's Faculty of Economy.

He began his shooting career in 1924. He won two silver and a bronze medal at 1937 ISSF World Shooting Championships. From 1934 to 1937 he was a member of Estonian national sport shooting team.

During World War II he was in German military service. In 1944 he fled to Germany, and in 1947 to England.
