= Gerhard Krimbacher =

Austrian sports shooter (born 1953)

Personal information
- Nationality: Austrian
- Born: 6 January 1953 (age 73)

Sport
- Sport: Sports shooting
Medal record
Representing Austria
ISSF World Shooting Championships
Silver medal – second place	1974 Thun	50 m free rifle standing 40 shots
European Shooting Championships
Silver medal – second place	1981 Athens	10 m air rifle
Bronze medal – third place	1980 Oslo	10 m air rifle

Gerhard Krimbacher (born 6 January 1953) is an Austrian sports shooter. He competed at the 1976 Summer Olympics and the 1984 Summer Olympics.
