= Michel Bury =

French sport shooter (born 1952)

Olympic medal record

Men's shooting

Representing France
Silver medal – second place	1984 Los Angeles	50 m rifle prone

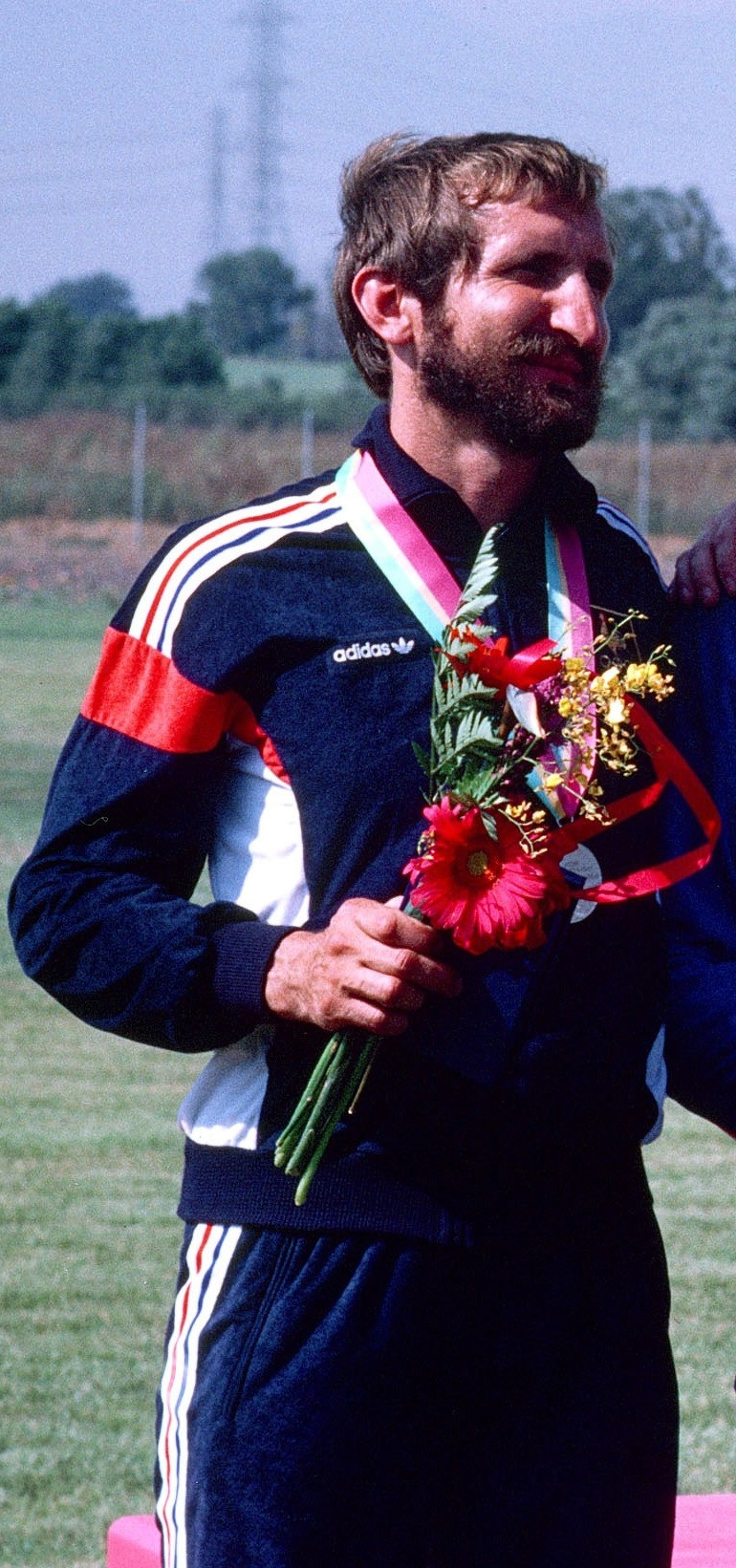
Michel Bury

Michel Bury (born 28 February 1952) is a French former sport shooter who competed in the 1984 Summer Olympics, in the 1992 Summer Olympics, and in the 1996 Summer Olympics.
