= Lucien Genot =

French sports shooter

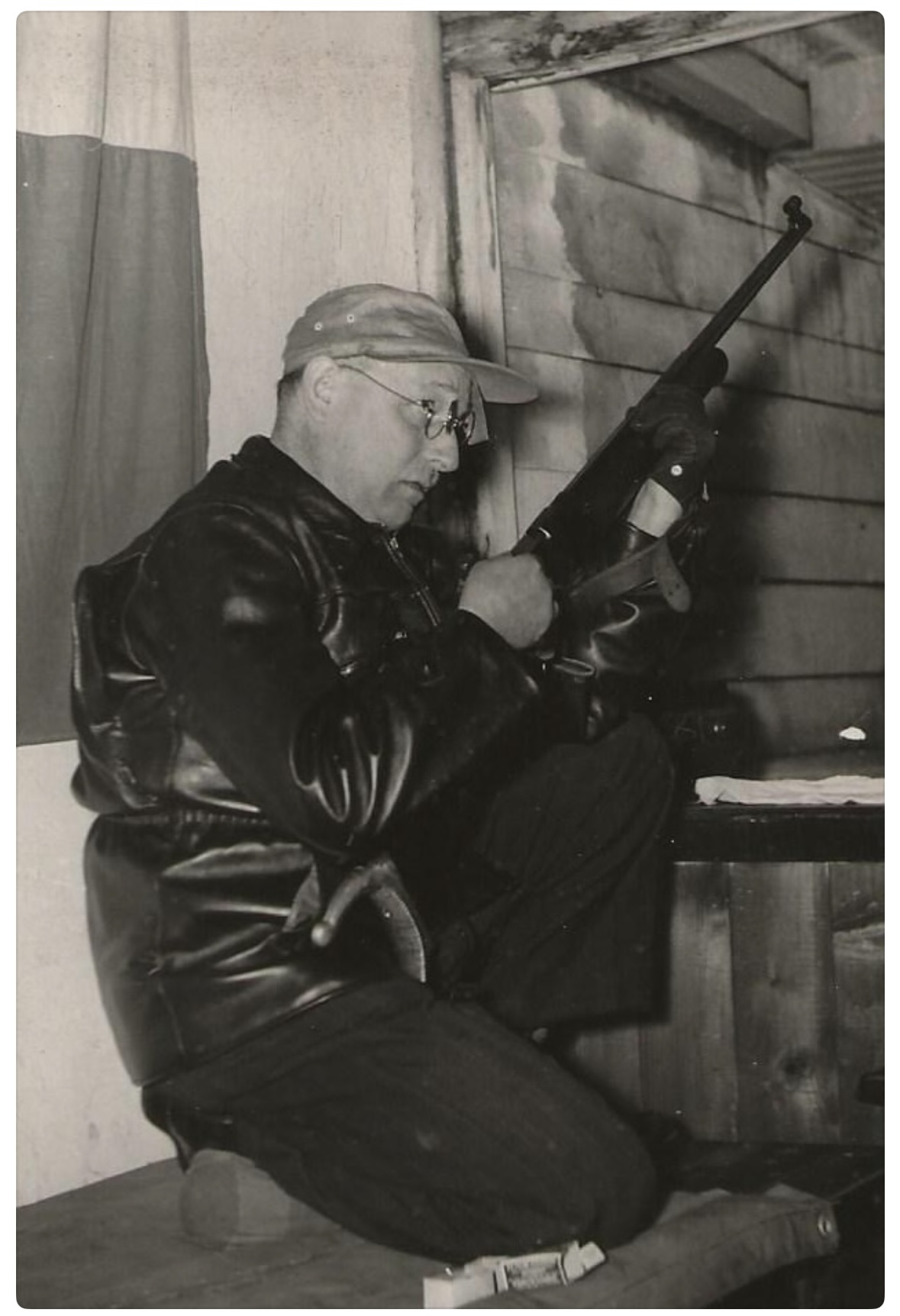

Personal information
- Born: 20 April 1901 Maidières, France
- Died: 10 December 1965 (aged 64)

Sport
- Sport: Sports shooting

Lucien Genot (20 April 1901 – 10 December 1965) was a French sports shooter. He competed in the 50 m rifle event at the 1948 Summer Olympics.
