= Antonín Schwarz =

Czech sports shooter

Personal information
- Nationality: Czech
- Born: 14 February 1940 (age 85); Plzeň, Protectorate of Bohemia and Moravia

Sport
- Sport: Sports shooting

Antonín Schwarz (born 14 February 1940) is a former Czechoslovak sports shooter. He competed in the men's 50 metre rifle three positions event at the 1976 Summer Olympics.
