= Elmar Kivistik =

Estonian sport shooter

Elmar Kivistik (13 November 1905 – 7 December 1973) was an Estonian sport shooter.

He was born in Elistvere Rural Municipality, Tartu County. In 1927 he graduated from a war school.

He began his shooting career in 1932. In total, he won 19 medals at ISSF World Shooting Championships. He was multiple-times Estonian champion in different shooting disciplines. 1934–1939 he was a member of Estonian national sport shooting team.

In 1949 he was arrested, and sent to a prison camp in Irkutsk Oblast.
