= Anker Hagen =

Norwegian sports shooter (1920–2017)

Personal information
- Born: 22 October 1920 Oslo, Norway
- Died: 19 September 2017 (aged 96)

Sport
- Sport: Sports shooting
Medal record
Men's shooting
Representing Norway
ISSF World Shooting Championships
| Silver medal – second place | 1954 Caracas | 50 metre free rifle prone 40 shots, men team |
| Silver medal – second place | 1954 Caracas | 50 metre free rifle standing 40 shots, men team |
| Bronze medal – third place | 1954 Caracas | 50 metre free rifle kneeling 40 shots, men team |
| Bronze medal – third place | 1954 Caracas | 50 metre rifle three positions, team |

Rolf Martin Anker Hagen (22 October 1920 – 19 September 2017) was a Norwegian sport shooter who competed in the 1956 Summer Olympics in Melbourne. Participating in two events, he finished 13th in a field of 44 shooters in the 50 metre rifle prone competition and 30th among 44 shooters in the 50 metre rifle three positions competition. A native of Oslo, he also attended the 1954 ISSF World Shooting Championships, where he brought home four medals from the team tournament: silver in the 50 metre free rifle prone and standing 40 shots events and bronze in the 50 metre free rifle kneeling 40 shots and 50 metre rifle three positions events.
