= Andrzej Sieledcow =

Polish sports shooter

Personal information
- Born: 16 July 1946 (age 79) Warsaw, Poland

Sport
- Sport: Sports shooting

Andrzej Sieledcow (born 16 July 1946) is a Polish former sports shooter. He competed in two events at the 1972 Summer Olympics.
