= Rolf Bergersen =

Norwegian sport shooter (1906–1966)

Personal information
- Born: 15 July 1906 Trøgstad, Norway
- Died: 29 April 1966 (aged 59) Oslo, Norway

Sport
- Sport: Sports shooting

Achievements and titles
- Olympic finals: 1952 Summer Olympics, 1956 Summer Olympics

Rolf Bergersen (15 July 1906 – 29 April 1966) was a Norwegian sport shooter, World Champion and Olympic competitor.

Bergersen became World Champion in running target in 1937, and again in 1949. He competed at the 1952 Summer Olympics in Helsinki, achieving a fourth place, and at the 1956 Summer Olympics in Melbourne, with a 6th placement.
