= Aleksandr Mitrofanov =

Soviet sports shooter

Personal information
- Nationality: Soviet
- Born: 16 May 1953 (age 71); Moscow, Russia

Sport
- Sport: Sports shooting

Aleksandr Mitrofanov (born 16 May 1953) is a Soviet sports shooter. He competed at the 1976 Summer Olympics and the 1980 Summer Olympics.
