= Johannes Siir =

Estonian sport shooter

Johannes Siir (11 May 1889 – 18 January 1941) was an Estonian military colonel and sport shooter.

He was born in Kolga Rural Municipality, Harju County. He participated in World War I and the Estonian War of Independence. In 1933 he graduated from Tondi military school.

He won bronze medal at 1931 ISSF World Shooting Championships; being the first Estonian sport shooter to get a medal at world shooting championships. 1931 he was a member of Estonian national sport shooting team. 1932–1939 he was the manager of Estonian team.
