= Peeter Karu =

Estonian sport shooter (1909–1942)

- Born: 21 September 1909; Võisiku Rural Municipality, Viljandi County, Estonia
- Died: 14 April 1942 (aged 32)
- Occupation: Sport shooter
- Known for: Winning medals at the 1939 ISSF World Shooting Championships
- Notable work: Estonian national champion in 1939

Peeter Karu (21 September 1909 – 14 April 1942) was an Estonian sport shooter. He was born in Võisiku Rural Municipality, Viljandi County.

He began his shooting career in 1937. He won three medals at 1939 ISSF World Shooting Championships. In 1939 he become Estonian champion. In 1939 he was a member of the Estonian national sport shooting team.
