= Andreas Beyeler =

Swiss sports shooter

Personal information
- Born: 25 June 1942 (age 84)

Sport
- Sport: Sports shooting

Andreas Beyeler (born 25 June 1942) is a Swiss former sports shooter. He competed in the 300 m rifle, three positions event at the 1972 Summer Olympics.
