= Viljo Leskinen =

Finnish sports shooter

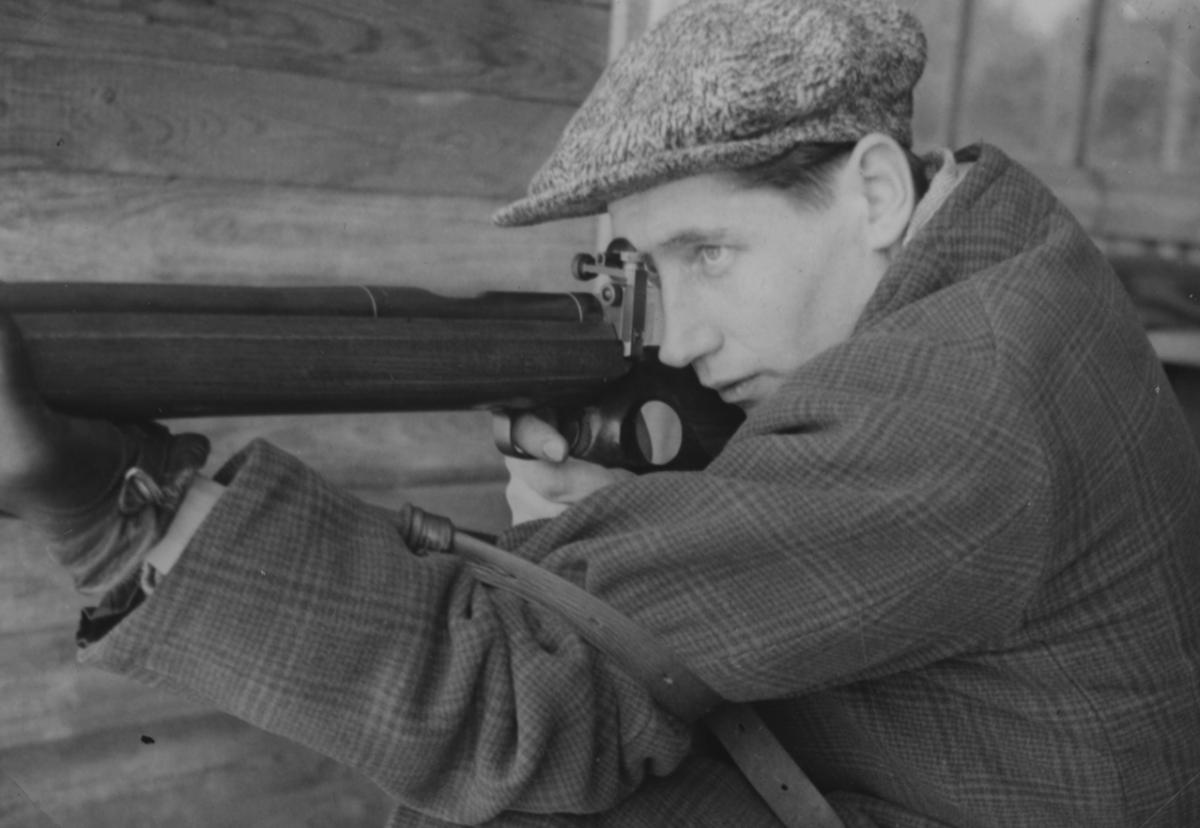

Personal information
- Full name: Viljo Armas Antero Leskinen
- Born: 16 December 1909 Toholampi, Grand Duchy of Finland
- Died: 16 November 1945 (aged 35) Helsinki, Finland

Sport
- Sport: Sports shooting

Viljo Armas Antero Leskinen (16 December 1909 – 16 November 1945) was a Finnish sports shooter. He competed in the 50 m rifle event at the 1936 Summer Olympics. In November 1945, Leskinen shot and killed a woman in a dispute and then committed suicide.
