= Kullervo Leskinen =

Finnish sports shooter

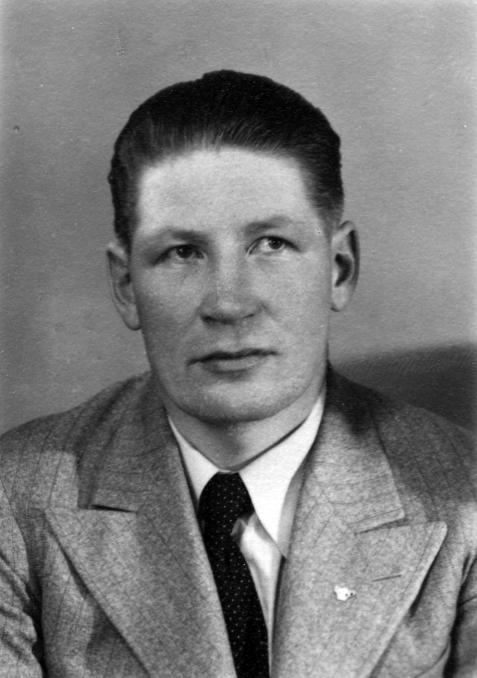

Personal information
- Born: 15 September 1908 Toholampi, Grand Duchy of Finland
- Died: 25 July 1989 (aged 80) Jyväskylä, Finland

Sport
- Sport: Sports shooting

Kullervo Leskinen (15 September 1908 – 25 July 1989) was a Finnish sports shooter. He competed at the 1948 Summer Olympics and 1952 Summer Olympics.
