= Erland Koch (Swedish sport shooter) =

Swedish sports shooter

Personal information
- Born: 4 July 1913 Munkedal, Sweden
- Died: 5 March 1972 (aged 58) Stockholm, Sweden

Sport
- Sport: Sports shooting

Erland Koch (4 July 1913 – 5 March 1972) was a Swedish sports shooter. He competed at the 1936 Summer Olympics and 1948 Summer Olympics.
