= Shooting at the 1964 Summer Olympics – Men's 50 metre rifle prone =

Men's 50 metre rifle, prone at the Games of the XVIII Olympiad
- Venue: Tokyo, Japan
- Date: 16 October 1964
- Competitors: 73 from 43 nations

Medalists
1st place, gold medalist(s)		László Hammerl	Hungary
2nd place, silver medalist(s)		Lones Wigger	United States
3rd place, bronze medalist(s)		Tommy Pool	United States

The men's 50 metre rifle, prone was a shooting sports event held as part of the Shooting at the 1964 Summer Olympics programme. It was the tenth appearance of the event. The competition was held on 16 October 1964 at the shooting ranges in Tokyo. 73 shooters from 43 nations competed.

== Results ==
Place	Shooter	Total
1	László Hammerl (HUN)	597
2	Lones Wigger (USA)	597
3	Tommy Pool (USA)	596
4	Gil Boa (CAN)	595
5	Nicolae Rotaru (ROU)	595
6	Akihiro Rinzaki (JPN)	594
7	Karl Wenk (EUA)	594
8	Traian Cogut (ROU)	593
9	Tibor Jakosits (HUN)	592
10	Velichko Velichkov (BUL)	592
11	Erwin Vogt (SUI)	592
12	Ole Hviid Jensen (DEN)	592
13	Hans Simonet (SUI)	591
14	Joop van Domselaar (NED)	591
15	Enrico Forcella (VEN)	591
16	Stanisław Marucha (POL)	591
17	Peter Morgan (GBR)	591
18	Jan Poignant (SWE)	591
19	Jesús Elizondo (MEX)	590
20	Vladimir Chuyan (URS)	590
21	Viktor Shamburkin (URS)	590
22	Norman Rule (AUS)	590
23	John Hall (GBR)	589
24	Rudolf Bortz (EUA)	589
25	Martsel Koen (BUL)	589
26	James Kirkwood (AUS)	589
27	Choomphol Chaiyanitr (THA)	589
28	Hubert Hammerer (AUT)	589
29	Niels Petersen (DEN)	588
30	Vladimír Stibořík (TCH)	588
31	George Marsh (CAN)	588
32	Lambis Manthos (GRE)	588
33	(Taiwan) Pan Kou-ang (TWN)	588
34	Adolfo Feliciano (PHI)	588
35	Mohamed Amin Fikry (EGY)	588
36	Thormod Næs (NOR)	587
37	Olegario Vázquez (MEX)	587
38	Roberto Huber (CHI)	586
39	Henry Souza (HKG)	586
40	Chu Hwa-il (KOR)	586
41	Antti Koskinen (FIN)	586
42	Frans Lafortune (BEL)	586
43	Vilho Ylönen (FIN)	585
44	Magne Landrø (NOR)	585
45	Victor Kremer (LUX)	584
46	Mohamed Sami El-Khatib (EGY)	584
47	Nehemia Sirkis (ISR)	584
48	Takao Ishii (JPN)	584
49	Oscar Caceres (PER)	584
50	Kyaw Shein (BIR)	584
51	John Sundberg (SWE)	584
52	Pacifico Salandanan (PHI)	583
53	Tang Peng Choi (MAS)	582
54	(Taiwan) Tai Chao-chih (TWN)	581
55	Kyaw Aye (BIR)	580
56	Pierre Guy (FRA)	580
57	Agustin Rangel (VEN)	580
58	Manuel da Costa (POR)	580
59	Melchor López (ARG)	579
60	Cirilo Nassiff (ARG)	579
61	Gholam Hossein Mobaser (IRI)	579
62	Pedro Medina (ESP)	579
63	Hannan Crystal (ISR)	579
64	Mohammad Jafar Kalani (IRI)	576
65	Heo Uk-bong (KOR)	574
66	Dennis Filmer (MAS)	574
67	Hongsa Purnaveja (THA)	574
68	Javier Caceres (PER)	572
69	Habarakadage Perera (CEY)	571
70	Peter Rull, Sr. (HKG)	571
71	Nigel Vernon-Roberts (KEN)	570
72	Ravi Jayewardene (CEY)	568
73	Aziz Ahmed Chaudhry (PAK)	567
