= Shooting at the 1960 Summer Olympics – Men's 50 metre rifle prone =

Shooting at the Games of the XVII Olympiad
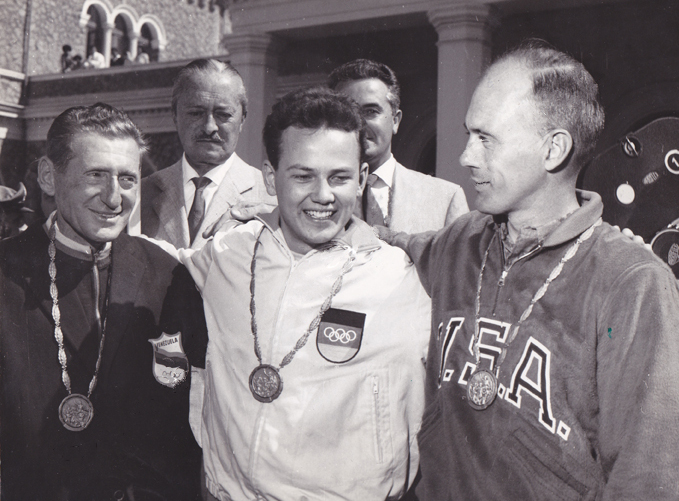
- Enrico Forcella, Peter Kohnke and James Enoch Hill
- Venue: Umberto I Shooting Range
- Dates: September 9 & 10, 1960

Medalists
1st place, gold medalist(s)		Peter Kohnke; United Team of Germany
2nd place, silver medalist(s)		Jim Hill; United States
3rd place, bronze medalist(s)		Enrico Forcella; Venezuela

The 50 metre rifle prone position rifle shooting event at the 1960 Olympic Games took place on September 9 & 10.

== Results ==
The top twenty-seven in each of the two qualifying groups advanced to the final round.

=== Qualifying round ===
Group one

Rank	Name	Nationality	Rd 1	Rd 2	Rd 3	Rd 4	Points
1	Nicolae Rotaru	Romania	99	96	98	98	391
2	William Godwin	Great Britain	97	97	98	99	391
3	Martsel Koen	Bulgaria	94	99	99	99	391
4	Johannes Human	South Africa	98	94	98	100	390
5	Carlos Lastarria	Peru	96	98	96	100	390
6	Hans Schönenberger	Switzerland	97	98	97	98	390
7	Bernd Klingner	United Team of Germany	95	99	97	98	389
8	Marat Nyýazow	Soviet Union	96	98	99	95	388
9	Kurt Johansson	Sweden	97	96	98	97	388
10	Daniel Puckel	United States	96	97	97	97	387
11	Egon Stephansen	Denmark	95	96	98	98	387
12	Gil Boa	Canada	97	96	94	99	386
13	Takao Ishii	Japan	98	95	98	94	385
14	Imre Simkó	Hungary	94	96	98	97	385
15	Peter Rull, Sr.	Hong Kong	93	97	97	97	384
16	Erling Kongshaug	Norway	96	96	95	97	384
17	Henryk Górski	Poland	97	94	95	98	384
18	Gholam Hossein Mobaser	Iran	94	99	96	95	384
19	Hernando Castelo	Philippines	94	94	97	98	383
20	Jacques Lafortune	Belgium	93	97	98	95	383
21	Petrus Visagie	Kenya	94	96	96	97	383
22	Vilho Ylönen	Finland	94	95	97	97	383
23	Pierre Guy	France	93	97	97	95	382
24	Norman Rule	Australia	93	96	96	97	382
25	Pierre Marsan	Monaco	92	97	95	97	381
26	Cirilo Nassiff	Argentina	95	94	95	96	380
27	José Cazorla	Venezuela	93	98	94	95	380
28	Josip Ćuk	Yugoslavia	96	95	92	96	379
29	José Llorens	Spain	97	95	94	92	378
30	César Batista	Portugal	91	98	94	95	378
31	Josef Fröwis	Austria	93	95	95	95	378
32	Rafael Peles	Israel	93	98	93	94	378
33	Ernesto Montemayor, Jr.	Mexico	94	93	94	96	377
34	Georgios Liveris	Greece	96	93	93	95	377
35	Abdullah Jaroudi, Jr.	Lebanon	95	95	91	96	377
36	Saroj Silpikul	Thailand	92	96	94	94	376
37	Dušan Houdek	Czechoslovakia	94	96	89	97	376
38	Gustav Kaufmann	Liechtenstein	94	94	91	95	374
39	Saifi Chaudhry	Pakistan	95	89	96	93	373
40	Chan Kooi Chye	Malaya	91	92	95	92	370
41	Habib Dallagi	Tunisia	86	90	88	89	353
42	Omar Anas	Sudan	86	85	92	88	351
43	Bouchaib Zeroual	Morocco	87	86	78	84	335

Group two

Rank	Name	Nationality	Rd 1	Rd 2	Rd 3	Rd 4	Points
1	Edson Warner	Canada	98	99	98	99	394
2	Iosif Sîrbu	Romania	98	98	99	98	393
3	Enrico Forcella	Venezuela	99	99	97	96	391
4	Jim Hill	United States	97	96	99	98	390
5	Jussi Nordqvist	Finland	98	97	99	95	389
6	Tor Richter	Norway	96	99	97	97	389
7	Hans Rudolf Spillmann	Switzerland	95	99	98	95	387
8	Peter Kohnke	United Team of Germany	98	98	96	95	387
9	Luiz Martins	Brazil	98	100	93	96	387
10	Vasily Borisov	Soviet Union	98	95	97	96	386
11	Arthur Skinner	Great Britain	96	97	94	98	385
12	Yukio Inokuma	Japan	96	97	92	99	384
13	Otakar Hořínek	Czechoslovakia	96	99	96	93	384
14	Frans Lafortune	Belgium	93	97	96	98	384
15	János Dosztály	Hungary	95	96	97	96	384
16	Don Tolhurst	Australia	97	95	97	94	383
17	César Jayme	Philippines	91	95	97	99	382
18	Mariano Antonelli	Italy	93	98	95	96	382
19	Wilhelm Sachsenmaier	Austria	95	97	96	94	382
20	Anders Kvissberg	Sweden	95	98	95	94	382
21	Georges Wahler	France	96	94	96	96	382
22	Niels Petersen	Denmark	96	93	96	97	382
23	Charles Trotter	Kenya	95	98	94	94	381
24	Jerzy Nowicki	Poland	98	96	93	94	381
25	Miroslav Stojanović	Yugoslavia	97	92	95	97	381
26	Henry Souza	Hong Kong	93	97	96	94	380
27	Paulino Díaz	Mexico	95	92	96	97	380
28	Melchor López	Argentina	95	93	94	97	379
29	José Luis Calvo	Spain	95	94	96	93	378
30	Carlos Cedron	Peru	92	97	94	95	378
31	Nikolaos Triantafyllopoulos	Greece	95	95	93	95	378
32	Velichko Velichkov	Bulgaria	94	92	95	96	377
33	David du Plessis	South Africa	97	94	86	99	376
34	Hannan Crystal	Israel	91	95	95	94	375
35	Albino da Silva	Portugal	92	94	94	95	375
36	Guido Wolf	Liechtenstein	92	96	92	94	374
37	Michel Ravarino	Monaco	91	93	97	86	367
38	Krisada Arunwong	Thailand	90	90	92	92	364
39	Victor Kremer	Luxembourg	88	92	88	96	364
40	Gibreel Ali	Sudan	92	86	90	89	357
41	Moustafa Chellouf	Tunisia	88	91	86	85	350
42	Mohamed Ben Boujemaa	Morocco	62	68	74	75	279

A total of 60 shots are taken from the prone position With the possibility of 600 overall points.

=== Final ===
Rank	Name	Nationality	Rd 1	Rd 2	Rd 3	Rd 4	Rd 5	Rd 6	Points
1st place, gold medalist(s)	Peter Kohnke	United Team of Germany	96	100	99	98	99	98	590
2nd place, silver medalist(s)	Jim Hill	United States	100	97	100	94	98	100	589
3rd place, bronze medalist(s)	Enrico Forcella	Venezuela	98	97	98	98	98	98	587
4	Vasily Borisov	Soviet Union	98	97	98	98	97	98	586
5	Arthur Skinner	Great Britain	98	98	96	98	97	99	586
6	Yukio Inokuma	Japan	97	99	98	97	97	98	586
7	Daniel Puckel	United States	97	95	99	97	98	99	585
8	Martsel Koen	Bulgaria	96	96	98	98	98	99	585
9	Marat Nyýazow	Soviet Union	95	97	98	99	99	97	585
10	Iosif Sîrbu	Romania	97	98	97	97	98	98	585
11	Anders Kvissberg	Sweden	97	98	97	98	98	96	584
12	Gil Boa	Canada	95	98	96	99	98	98	584
13	Henryk Górski	Poland	96	95	99	99	96	98	583
14	Pierre Guy	France	96	97	99	97	98	96	583
15	Kurt Johansson	Sweden	93	99	97	97	97	99	582
16	Egon Stephansen	Denmark	92	98	98	98	98	98	582
17	Vilho Ylönen	Finland	95	96	100	96	98	97	582
18	Jussi Nordqvist	Finland	95	97	98	98	98	96	582
19	Bernd Klingner	United Team of Germany	98	95	95	100	97	97	582
20	Takao Ishii	Japan	95	95	99	97	98	98	582
21	János Dosztály	Hungary	94	95	96	98	100	97	580
22	Erling Kongshaug	Norway	98	96	98	96	95	97	580
23	Niels Petersen	Denmark	98	95	97	96	98	96	580
24	Nicolae Rotaru	Romania	97	94	100	96	94	98	579
25	William Godwin	Great Britain	98	96	97	97	94	97	579
26	Jerzy Nowicki	Poland	95	97	97	98	98	94	579
27	Edson Warner	Canada	99	93	97	97	95	97	578
28	Otakar Hořínek	Czechoslovakia	98	95	93	98	98	96	578
29	Carlos Lastarria	Peru	94	97	97	98	96	96	578
30	Imre Simkó	Hungary	95	98	95	95	96	99	578
31	Johannes Human	South Africa	97	96	97	95	96	97	578
32	Hans Rudolf Spillmann	Switzerland	93	94	98	97	96	99	577
33	Luiz Martins	Brazil	97	96	97	96	96	95	577
34	Tor Richter	Norway	94	98	96	95	97	97	577
35	Mariano Antonelli	Italy	94	98	94	99	97	94	576
36	Peter Rull, Sr.	Hong Kong	96	97	98	94	96	95	576
37	Charles Trotter	Kenya	97	94	95	94	97	97	574
38	Don Tolhurst	Australia	94	93	99	94	96	98	574
39	Frans Lafortune	Belgium	95	94	96	96	96	97	574
40	Cirilo Nassiff	Argentina	95	96	95	95	95	97	573
41	Henry Souza	Hong Kong	97	95	93	98	96	93	572
42	Wilhelm Sachsenmaier	Austria	95	96	97	96	94	94	572
43	Petrus Visagie	Kenya	93	94	96	98	94	96	571
44	César Jayme	Philippines	94	94	99	93	94	97	571
45	Paulino Díaz	Mexico	89	93	99	98	95	96	570
46	José Cazorla	Venezuela	94	95	97	94	95	95	570
47	Norman Rule	Australia	92	94	95	94	95	99	569
48	Pierre Marsan	Monaco	94	94	94	97	97	93	569
49	Hans Schönenberger	Switzerland	94	92	96	97	95	95	569
50	Gholam Hossein Mobaser	Iran	98	94	94	93	94	94	567
51	Miroslav Stojanović	Yugoslavia	96	86	96	97	95	96	566
52	Hernando Castelo	Philippines	96	93	95	93	94	95	566
53	Georges Wahler	France	96	93	91	94	97	93	564
54	Jacques Lafortune	Belgium	90	94	94	95	93	89	555
