= Morocco at the 1960 Summer Olympics =

- IOC code: MAR
- NOC: Moroccan Olympic Committee

in Rome
- Competitors: 47 (all men) in 10 sports
- Medals Ranked 32nd: Gold 0 Silver 1 Bronze 0 Total 1

Summer Olympics appearances (overview)
- 1960; 1964; 1968; 1972; 1976; 1980; 1984; 1988; 1992; 1996; 2000; 2004; 2008; 2012; 2016; 2020; 2024; 2028

Morocco competed in the Summer Olympic Games for the first time at the 1960 Summer Olympics in Rome, Italy. 47 competitors, all men, took part in 45 events in 10 sports.

== Medalists ==
Medal	Name	Sport	Event	Date
Silver	Rhadi Ben Abdesselam	Athletics	Men's marathon	10 September

== Athletics ==
Morocco took 8 male athletes to the 1960 Olympic Games.

Key

- Note–Ranks given for track events are within the athlete's heat only
- Q = Qualified for the next round
- q = Qualified for the next round as a fastest loser or, in field events, by position without achieving the qualifying target
- N/A = Round not applicable for the event
- Bye = Athlete not required to compete in round

Men

Athlete	Event	Heat		Quarterfinal		Semifinal		Final	
Athlete	Event	Result	Rank	Result	Rank	Result	Rank	Result	Rank
Bouchaib El-Maachi	100 m	10.9	5	did not advance					
Bouchaib El-Maachi	200 m	22.3	5	did not advance					
Ahmed Lazreg	800 m	1:55.91	6	did not advance					
Mohamed Saïd	5000 m	14:53.6	10	—N/a				did not advance	
Rhadi Ben Abdesselam	10,000 m	—N/a						29:32.00	14
Rhadi Ben Abdesselam	Marathon	—N/a						2:15:41.6	2nd place, silver medalist(s)
Bakir Benaïssa	Marathon	—N/a						2:21:21.4	8
Allal Saoudi	Marathon	—N/a						2:59:41.0	61
Mohamed Zouaki	400 m hurdles	55.65	6	—N/a		did not advance			
Mohamed Lahcen	3000 m steeplechase	9:29.4	11	—N/a				did not advance	

== Boxing ==
Morocco took seven boxers to the 1960 Olympic Games, none of whom won a fight.

Athlete	Event	Round 1	Round of 32	Round of 16	Quarterfinals	Semifinals	Final
Athlete	Event	Opposition Result	Opposition Result	Opposition Result	Opposition Result	Opposition Result	Opposition Result
Abdel Kader Belghiti	Flyweight	Bye	Gattellari (AUS); L 0-5	did not advance			
Ahmed Bouazza	Bantamweight	Bye	Taylor (AUS); L 0-5	did not advance			
Mohamed Hassan	Featherweight	Kirsch (EUA); L 1-4	did not advance				
Abdel Kader Gangani	Lightweight	Bye	Ito (JPN); L 0-5	did not advance			
Mohamed Boubekeur	Light welterweight	Bye	Quartey (GHA); L 0-5	did not advance			
Mohamed Atmani	Welterweight	Bye	Aho (FIN); L 2-3	did not advance			
Moustafa Ben Lahbib	Middleweight	Napoleoni (ITA); L 0-5	did not advance				

== Cycling ==
Four cyclists represented Morocco in 1960.

=== Road ===
Athlete	Event	Time	Rank
Mohamed Ben Mohamed	Road race	4:21:58	45
Mohamed Ghandora (Note: otherwise Mohamed Gandoura Lachheb, Lachhab or Lachab)	Road race	4:21:58	46
Abdallah Lahoucine	Road race	4:25:44	57
Ahmed Omar	Road race	did not finish	

Time trial

Athlete	Event	Time	Rank
Mohamed Ben Mohamed; Mohamed Ghandora; Abdallah Lahoucine; Ahmed Omar	Time trial	2:27:41.35	19

== Fencing ==
Seven fencers represented Morocco in 1960.

=== Individual Foil ===
==== Round One ====
Three fencers from Morocco participated in Round One which was a group stage.

==== Pool 8 ====
Team	W	L	TG	TR
Jean Link (LUX)	5	0	25	8
László Kamuti (HUN)	5	1	27	17
Brian McCowage (AUS)	4	2	23	21
Heizaburo Okawa (JPN)	3	3	23	19
Orvar Lindwall (SWE)	2	3	15	21
Charles El-Gressy (MAR)	0	5	8	25
Trần Văn Xuân (VIE)	0	5	12	25

- Lindwall (SWE) — El-Gressy (MAR) 5-2
- Okawa (JPN) — El-Gressy (MAR) 5-0
- McCowage (AUS) — El-Gressy (MAR) 5-4
- Kamuti (HUN) — El-Gressy (MAR) 5-2
- Link (LUX) — El-Gressy (MAR) 5-0

==== Pool 10 ====
Team	W	L	TG	TR
Eberhard Mehl (EUA)	5	0	25	5
Ryszard Parulski (POL)	4	1	24	14
Albie Axelrod (USA)	3	2	17	16
Jaime Duque (COL)	1	3	12	17
Claudio Polledri (SUI)	1	3	13	17
Abderraouf El-Fassy (MAR)	0	5	7	25

- Polledri (SUI) — El-Fassy (MAR) 5-2
- Duque (COL) — El-Fassy (MAR) 5-2
- Axelrod (USA) — El-Fassy (MAR) 5-2
- Parulski (POL) — El-Fassy (MAR) 5-1
- Mehl (EUA) — El-Fassy (MAR) 5-0

==== Pool 12 ====
Team	W	L	TG	TR
Alberto Pellegrino (ITA)	4	0	20	7
Ion Drîmbă (ROU)	4	1	24	12
André Verhalle (BEL)	4	1	23	12
Carl Schwende (CAN)	2	3	18	16
Brian Hamilton (IRL)	1	3	9	19
Emilio Echeverry (COL)	1	3	8	18
Mohamed Ben Joullon (MAR)	0	5	7	25

- Hamilton (IRL) — Ben Joullon (MAR) 5-4
- Schwende (CAN) — Ben Joullon (MAR) 5-1
- Verhalle (BEL) — Ben Joullon (MAR) 5-0
- Drîmbă (ROU) — Ben Joullon (MAR) 5-2
- Pellegrino (ITA) — Ben Joullon (MAR) 5-0

=== Team Foil ===
==== Round One ====
Morocco participated in Round One which was a group stage. The six fencers representing Morocco were Charles El-Gressy, Abderraouf El-Fassy, Abderrahman Sebti, Abbes Harchi, Mohamed Ben Joullon, Jacques Ben Gualid. Four fencers were selected for each match. Each fencer had four bouts per match.

==== Pool 8 ====
Team	W	L	TG	TR
United States (USA)	2	0	25	4
Poland (POL)	1	1	20	9
Morocco (MAR)	0	2	0	32

- Poland (POL) — Morocco (MAR) 16-0
- United States (USA) — Morocco (MAR) 16-0

=== Individual Épée ===
==== Round One ====
Three fencers from Morocco participated in Round One which was a group stage.

==== Pool 1 ====
Team	W
Jack Guittet (FRA)	4
Brian Pickworth (NZL)	4
Bogdan Gonsior (POL)	3
Emilio Echeverry (COL)	3
Raoul Barouch (TUN)	1
Charles El-Gressy (MAR)	0

- Barouch (TUN) — El-Gressy (MAR) 5-3
- Echeverry (COL) — El-Gressy (MAR) 5-3
- Gonsior (POL) — El-Gressy (MAR) 5-3
- Pickworth (NZL) — El-Gressy (MAR) 5-1
- Guittet (FRA) — El-Gressy (MAR) 5-0

==== Pool 3 ====
Team	W
Kazuhiko Tabuchi (JPN)	5
Alberto Pellegrino (ITA)	4
David Micahnik (USA)	4
Raúl Martínez (ARG)	3
George Carpenter (IRL)	3
Claudio Polledri (SUI)	2
Abderrahman Sebti (MAR)	0

- Tabuchi (JPN) — Sebti (MAR) 5-4
- Pellegrino (ITA) — Sebti (MAR) 5-3
- Michanik (USA) — Sebti (MAR) 5-0
- Martínez (ARG) — Sebti (MAR) 5-1
- Carpenter (IRL) — Sebti (MAR) 5-2
- Polledri (SUI) — Sebti (MAR) 5-3

==== Pool 6 ====
Team	W
Bruno Habārovs (URS)	5
Janusz Kurczab (POL)	4
Jules Amez-Droz (SUI)	4
Robert Schiel (LUX)	2
Abbes Harchi (MAR)	2
Christopher Bland (IRL)	1
John Simpson (AUS)	0

- Habārovs (URS) — Sebti (MAR) 5-1
- Kurczab (POL) — Sebti (MAR) 5-2
- Amez-Droz (SUI) — Sebti (MAR) 5-2
- Harchi (MAR) — Bland (IRL) 5-4
- Harchi (MAR) — Simpson (AUS) 5-0

=== Team Épée ===
==== Round One ====
Morocco participated in Round One which was a group stage. The five fencers representing Morocco were Abderraouf El-Fassy, Abderrahman Sebti, Abbes Harchi, Mohamed Ben Joullon and Charles Bénitah. Four fencers were selected for each match. Each fencer had four bouts per match.

==== Pool 5 ====
Team	W	L	TG	TR
Great Britain (GBR)	2	0	23	8
Luxembourg (LUX)	1	1	19	12
Morocco (MAR)	0	2	5	27

- Great Britain (GBR) — Morocco (MAR) 15-1
- Luxembourg (LUX) — Morocco (MAR) 12-4

=== Individual Sabre ===
==== Round One ====
Three fencers from Morocco participated in Round One which was a group stage.

==== Pool 2 ====
Team	W	L	TG	TR
Wladimiro Calarese (ITA)	4	0	20	6
Nugzar Asatiani (EUA)	3	1	17	9
Günther Ulrich (AUT)	3	1	16	11
Michael Sichel (AUS)	1	3	11	16
Pablo Ordejón (ESP)	0	3	3	15
Abderrahman Sebti (MAR)	0	3	3	15

- Asatiani (EUA) — Sebti (MAR) 5-1
- Ulrich (AUT) — Sebti (MAR) 5-1
- Sichel (AUS) — Sebti (MAR) 5-1

==== Pool 3 ====
Team	W	L	TG	TR
Jürgen Theuerkauff (GER)	4	0	20	9
Ryszard Zub (POL)	3	1	19	13
Boris Stavrev (BUL)	2	2	15	12
Tsugeo Ozawa (JPN)	1	3	9	17
Jacques Ben Gualid (MAR)	0	5	8	20

- Theuerkauff (GER) — Ben Gualid (MAR) 5-2
- Zub (POL) — Ben Gualid (MAR) 5-2
- Stavrev (BUL) — Ben Gualid (MAR) 5-2
- Ozawa (JPN) — Ben Gualid (MAR) 5-2

==== Pool 9 ====
Team	W	L	TG	TR
Aladár Gerevich (HUN)	5	0	25	12
Michael D'Asaro Sr. (USA)	4	1	22	15
Emeric Arus (ROU)	3	2	23	16
Gustave Ballister (BEL)	2	3	18	18
Michael Ron (ISR)	1	4	13	22
Mohamed Ben Joullon (MAR)	0	5	7	25

- Gerevich (HUN) — Ben Joullon (MAR) 5-1
- D'Asaro Sr. (USA) — Ben Joullon (MAR) 5-3
- Arus (ROU) — Ben Joullon (MAR) 5-1
- Ballister (BEL) — Ben Joullon (MAR) 5-0
- Ron (ISR) — Ben Joullon (MAR) 5-2

=== Team Sabre ===
==== Round One ====
Morocco participated in Round One which was a group stage. The four fencers representing Morocco were Abderraouf El-Fassy, Abderrahman Sebti, Mohamed Ben Joullon and Jacques Ben Gualid.

==== Pool 6 ====
Team	W	L	TG	TR
United States (USA)	2	0	25	6
Germany (GER)	1	1	21	10
Morocco (MAR)	0	2	1	31

- United States (USA) — Morocco (MAR) 16-0
- Germany (GER) — Morocco (MAR) 15-1

== Gymnastics ==
=== Men's Individual ===
Six gymnasts from Morocco took part in the individual event.

Individual finals

Athlete	Event	Apparatus						Total	Rank
Athlete	Event	F	PH	R	V	PB	HB	Total	Rank
Mohamed Sekkat	All-around							78.85	123
Mohamed Sekkat	Floor	16.15	—N/a					16.15	119
Mohamed Sekkat	Pommel horse	—N/a	10.35	—N/a				10.35	122
Mohamed Sekkat	Rings	—N/a		13.35	—N/a			13.35	122
Mohamed Sekkat	Vault	—N/a			14.45	—N/a		14.45	126
Mohamed Sekkat	Parallel bars	—N/a				14.10	—N/a	14.10	122
Mohamed Sekkat	Horizontal bar	—N/a					10.45	10.45	124
Ahmed Fellat	All-around							70.70	124
Ahmed Fellat	Floor	15.60	—N/a					15.60	123
Ahmed Fellat	Pommel horse	—N/a	9.50	—N/a				9.50	123
Ahmed Fellat	Rings	—N/a		8.75	—N/a			8.75	125
Ahmed Fellat	Vault	—N/a			15.65	—N/a		15.65	120
Ahmed Fellat	Parallel bars	—N/a				10.40	—N/a	10.40	124
Ahmed Fellat	Horizontal bar	—N/a					10.45	10.45	124
Miloud M'Sellek	All-around							36.25	125
Miloud M'Sellek	Floor	12.15	—N/a					12.15	128
Miloud M'Sellek	Pommel horse	—N/a	7.00	—N/a				7.00	127
Miloud M'Sellek	Rings	—N/a		12.20	—N/a			12.20	123
Miloud M'Sellek	Vault	—N/a			16.80	—N/a		16.80	109
Miloud M'Sellek	Parallel bars	—N/a				9.50	—N/a	9.50	126
Miloud M'Sellek	Horizontal bar	—N/a					7.35	7.35	127
Abdesselem Regragui	All-around							62.50	126
Abdesselem Regragui	Floor	14.10	—N/a					14.10	126
Abdesselem Regragui	Pommel horse	—N/a	8.75	—N/a				8.75	125
Abdesselem Regragui	Rings	—N/a		7.50	—N/a			7.50	128
Abdesselem Regragui	Vault	—N/a			12.75	—N/a		12.75	127
Abdesselem Regragui	Parallel bars	—N/a				10.25	—N/a	10.25	125
Abdesselem Regragui	Horizontal bar	—N/a					9.15	9.15	125
Darif Tanjaoui	All-around							59.95	127
Darif Tanjaoui	Floor	15.95	—N/a					15.95	121
Darif Tanjaoui	Pommel horse	—N/a	9.05	—N/a				9.05	124
Darif Tanjaoui	Rings	—N/a		8.20	—N/a			8.20	127
Darif Tanjaoui	Vault	—N/a			11.50	—N/a		11.50	128
Darif Tanjaoui	Parallel bars	—N/a				9.25	—N/a	9.25	127
Darif Tanjaoui	Horizontal bar	—N/a					6.00	6.00	129
Kacem Klifa	All-around							6.50	130
Kacem Klifa	Parallel bars	—N/a				2.50	—N/a	2.50	129
Kacem Klifa	Horizontal bar	—N/a					4.00	4.00	130

=== Men's team ===
The same six gymnasts competed in the team event. Each gymnast to perform a compulsory and an optional exercise on all six apparatuses. Top five scores per team on each of the 12 exercises count towards the team score.

Apparatus
Apparatus	Compulsory	Optional	Total	Rank
Floor	36.25	37.70	73.95	20
Vault	35.10	36.05	71.15	20
Parallel bars	21.00	32.50	53.50	20
Horizontal bar	18.50	26.25	44.75	20
Rings	23.60	26.40	50.00	20
Pommel horse	19.15	25.50	44.65	20
Total	153.60	184.40	338.00	20

== Modern pentathlon ==
Two male pentathletes represented Morocco in 1960, but neither completed the event.

Individual

Athlete	Riding (show jumping)			Fencing (épée one touch)			Shooting (10 m air pistol)			Swimming (300 m freestyle)			Running (4000 m)			Total points	Final rank
Athlete	Penalties	Rank	MP points	Wins	Rank	MP points	Score	Rank	MP points	Time	Rank	MP Points	Time	Rank	MP Points	Total points	Final rank
Mohamed Ben Checkroun	80	52	671	did not finish													
Naji El-Mekki	did not finish																

== Sailing ==
Only one Moroccan sailor competed in the Olympic Regatta in Naples. El-Moustafa Haddad competed in the Finn class.

Athlete	Event	Race							Net points	Final rank
Athlete	Event	1	2	3	4	5	6	7	Net points	Final rank
El-Moustafa Haddad	Finn	30	19	28	30	~~33~~	28	20	1,442	31

== Shooting ==
Four shooters represented Morocco in 1960.

Athlete	Event	Qualification		Final	
Athlete	Event	Points	Rank	Points	Rank
Naji El-Mekki	25m rapid fire pistol	—N/a		501	54
Naji El-Mekki	50 m pistol	247	66	did not advance	
Bouchaib Zeroual	50m rifle 3 positions	360	74	did not advance	
Bouchaib Zeroual	50 m rifle prone	335	84	did not advance	
Abdesselem Lahmidi	50m rifle 3 positions	316	75	did not advance	
Mohamed Ben Boujemaa	50 m rifle prone	279	85	did not advance	

== Weightlifting ==
Athlete	Event	Military Press		Snatch		Clean & Jerk		Total	Rank
Athlete	Event	Result	Rank	Result	Rank	Result	Rank	Total	Rank
Abderrahim Tazi (Note: also competed at the 1964 Summer Olympics)	Men's −67.5 kg	90.0	27	92.5	=25	125.0	=20	307.5	23
Mustapha Adnane	Men's −75 kg	115.0	=9	110.0	=12	140.0	=12	365.0	13
Mohamed Miloud	Men's −75 kg	105.0	=18	97.5	20	125.0	=18	327.5	19
Abdel Kader Ben Kamel	Men's −82.5 kg	105.0	22	102.5	21	130.0	=20	337.5	20

== Wrestling ==
Scoring by negative points, with negative points given for any result short of a fall. Accumulation of 6 negative points eliminated the wrestler. Morocco had 5 wrestlers all competing in the Greco-Roman category.

Key:

- VT – Victory by Fall.
- DE – Decision by Points.
- DR – Draw.

Men's Greco-Roman Wrestling

Athlete	Event	Round 1	Round 2	Round 3	Round 4	Round 5	Round 6	Round 7	Final Round
Athlete	Event	Opposition Result	Opposition Result	Opposition Result	Opposition Result	Opposition Result	Opposition Result	Opposition Result	Opposition Result
Michel Ben Akoun	Bantamweight	Cernea (ROU); L 4-0 ^{VT}	Alflen (NED); L 4-0 ^{VT}	did not advance					
Rahal Mahassine	Featherweight	Bye	Allen (USA); L 3-1 ^{DE}	Polyák (HUN); L 4-0 ^{VT}	did not advance				
Mohamed Moukrim Ben Mansour	Lightweight	Kitamura (JPN); L 4-0 ^{VT}	Arawiki (LIB); L 3-1 ^{DE}	did not advance					
Sam Azoulay	Welterweight	Ali (UAR); L 3-1 ^{DE}	Bye	Schiermeyer (FRA); L 4-0 ^{VT}	did not advance				
Hammou Haddaoui Khadir	Middleweight	Hunt (AUS); D 2-2 ^{DR}	Dubicki (POL); L 4-0 ^{VT}	did not advance					
