= Shooting at the 1960 Summer Olympics – Men's 50 metre rifle three positions =

Men's shooting at the Games of the XVII Olympiad
- Venue: Umberto I Shooting Range
- Dates: 7-8 September 1960
- Competitors: 75 from 41 nations

Medalists
1st place, gold medalist(s)		Viktor Shamburkin; Soviet Union
2nd place, silver medalist(s)		Marat Nyýazow; Soviet Union
3rd place, bronze medalist(s)		Klaus Zähringer; United Team of Germany

The men's 50 metre rifle three positions rifle shooting event at the 1960 Olympic Games took place on 7–8 September 1960 with 75 shooters from 41 nations competing. The three positions consist of; prone position, kneeling position and standing position.

== Results ==
All shooters scoring 530 points are better, of the two qualifying groups, qualify for the final round.

=== Qualifying round ===
Group one

Rank	Name	Nationality	Prone	Kneeling	Standing	Total
1	Iosif Sîrbu	Romania	195	188	186	569
2	Otakar Hořínek	Czechoslovakia	190	191	185	566
3	Jerzy Nowicki	Poland	195	190	180	565
4	Jim Hill	United States	197	191	173	561
5	Marat Nyýazow	Soviet Union	196	193	171	560
6	Bernd Klingner	United Team of Germany	196	187	177	560
7	Esa Kervinen	Finland	194	188	178	560
8	Walther Fröstell	Sweden	193	188	173	554
9	Michiel Victor	South Africa	199	187	167	553
10	Imre Simkó	Hungary	194	181	178	553
11	Georges Wahler	France	190	190	172	552
12	Josef Fröwis	Austria	193	182	176	551
13	Magne Landrø	Norway	188	187	176	551
14	Norman Rule	Australia	192	188	169	549
15	Ivan Lazarov	Bulgaria	186	186	177	549
16	Steffen Cranmer	Great Britain	190	189	168	547
17	Miroslav Stojanović	Yugoslavia	190	182	175	547
18	Uffe Schultz Larsen	Denmark	187	184	173	544
19	Jorge di Giandoménico	Argentina	193	178	172	543
20	Evald Gering	Canada	195	179	168	542
21	Wu Tao-yan	Formosa	189	187	164	540
22	Georgios Liveris	Greece	191	182	164	537
23	Bernardo San Juan	Philippines	189	180	167	536
24	Hans Schönenberger	Switzerland	190	174	170	534
25	Sergio Rolandi	Italy	189	179	165	533
26	Hannan Crystal	Israel	191	167	174	532
27	Frans Lafortune	Belgium	191	180	159	530
28	Carlos Cedron	Peru	189	177	162	528
29	José María Vallsera	Colombia	189	181	157	527
30	Gilbert Scorsoglio	Monaco	184	174	158	516
31	José Llorens	Spain	177	182	157	516
32	Manoel da Silva	Portugal	192	162	154	508
33	Guido Wolf	Liechtenstein	179	170	144	493
34	Saroj Silpikul	Thailand	184	171	133	488
35	Gholam Hossein Mobaser	Iran	190	155	126	471
36	Gibreel Ali	Sudan	181	161	112	454
37	Abdesselem Lahmidi	Morocco	158	97	61	316

Group two

Rank	Name	Nationality	Prone	Kneeling	Standing	Total
1	János Holup	Hungary	197	190	175	562
2	Viktor Shamburkin	Soviet Union	197	189	176	562
3	Hubert Hammerer	Austria	195	189	178	562
4	Pauli Janhonen	Finland	189	190	182	561
5	Daniel Puckel	United States	190	192	178	560
6	Anders Kvissberg	Sweden	196	181	182	559
7	Branislav Lončar	Yugoslavia	193	185	180	558
8	Dušan Houdek	Czechoslovakia	192	191	175	558
9	Nicolae Rotaru	Romania	192	189	176	557
10	Niels Petersen	Denmark	191	182	183	556
11	Velichko Velichkov	Bulgaria	191	184	180	555
12	Klaus Zähringer	United Team of Germany	188	189	178	555
13	Pedro Armella	Argentina	198	182	174	554
14	Henryk Górski	Poland	183	192	179	554
15	Kurt Müller	Switzerland	189	189	174	552
16	Johannes Human	South Africa	196	182	167	545
17	Pierre Guy	France	192	181	172	545
18	Erling Kongshaug	Norway	188	182	175	545
19	Jacques Lafortune	Belgium	193	185	165	543
20	Rafael Peles	Israel	194	180	167	541
21	Vincenzo Biava	Italy	189	179	173	541
22	Don Tolhurst	Australia	194	189	157	540
23	Gil Boa	Canada	195	190	153	538
24	Takao Ishii	Japan	187	180	171	538
25	Adolfo Feliciano	Philippines	190	178	165	533
26	Derek Robinson	Great Britain	190	182	159	531
27	Nikolaos Triantafyllopoulos	Greece	189	180	162	531
28	Luiz Martins	Brazil	193	171	161	525
29	António Tavares	Portugal	188	172	165	525
30	Carlos Lastarria	Peru	187	170	167	524
31	José Manuel Andoin	Spain	182	176	161	519
32	Krisada Arunwong	Thailand	185	171	160	516
33	Gustav Kaufmann	Liechtenstein	182	166	159	507
34	Saifi Chaudhry	Pakistan	185	160	161	506
35	Francis Boisson	Monaco	189	164	151	504
36	Victor Kremer	Luxembourg	178	160	150	488
37	Omar Anas	Sudan	153	133	95	381
38	Bouchaib Zeroual	Morocco	155	97	108	360

A total of 120 shots are taken 40 from each position, for a total of 400 points at each position. With the possibility of 1,200 overall points.

=== Final ===
Rank	Name	Nationality	Prone	Kneeling	Standing	Total	Notes
1st place, gold medalist(s)	Viktor Shamburkin	Soviet Union	394	386	369	1149	=WR
2nd place, silver medalist(s)	Marat Nyýazow	Soviet Union	384	388	373	1145	
3rd place, bronze medalist(s)	Klaus Zähringer	United Team of Germany	394	381	364	1139	
4	Dušan Houdek	Czechoslovakia	387	386	366	1139	
5	Jerzy Nowicki	Poland	394	378	365	1137	
6	Esa Kervinen	Finland	392	381	364	1137	
7	Daniel Puckel	United States	390	385	361	1136	
8	János Holup	Hungary	394	384	356	1134	
9	Josef Fröwis	Austria	389	381	364	1134	
10	Otakar Hořínek	Czechoslovakia	393	373	367	1133	
11	Hubert Hammerer	Austria	391	382	359	1132	
12	Iosif Sîrbu	Romania	390	384	357	1131	
13	Pauli Janhonen	Finland	392	377	361	1130	
14	Velichko Velichkov	Bulgaria	391	382	355	1128	
15	Imre Simkó	Hungary	389	380	359	1128	
16	Anders Kvissberg	Sweden	390	375	362	1127	
17	Kurt Müller	Switzerland	384	370	372	1126	
18	Bernd Klingner	United Team of Germany	391	380	352	1123	
19	Henryk Górski	Poland	382	388	352	1122	
20	Ivan Lazarov	Bulgaria	382	378	360	1120	
21	Miroslav Stojanović	Yugoslavia	392	369	356	1117	
22	Hans Schönenberger	Switzerland	391	370	356	1117	
23	Niels Petersen	Denmark	386	369	361	1116	
24	Jim Hill	United States	392	378	345	1115	
25	Nicolae Rotaru	Romania	394	373	347	1114	
26	Walther Fröstell	Sweden	389	376	348	1113	
27	Don Tolhurst	Australia	388	376	349	1113	
28	Georges Wahler	France	385	371	356	1112	
29	Derek Robinson	Great Britain	385	373	353	1111	
30	Takao Ishii	Japan	386	377	347	1110	
31	Jacques Lafortune	Belgium	386	375	347	1108	
32	Pierre Guy	France	385	374	349	1108	
33	Jorge di Giandoménico	Argentina	386	370	351	1107	
34	Pedro Armella	Argentina	388	380	338	1106	
35	Johannes Human	South Africa	391	367	347	1105	
36	Wu Tao-yan	Formosa	392	377	335	1104	
37	Branislav Lončar	Yugoslavia	384	379	341	1104	
38	Erling Kongshaug	Norway	384	370	350	1104	
39	Magne Landrø	Norway	389	364	350	1103	
40	Adolfo Feliciano	Philippines	387	365	351	1103	
41	Vincenzo Biava	Italy	383	372	372	1099	
42	Frans Lafortune	Belgium	383	367	349	1099	
43	Steffen Cranmer	Great Britain	387	373	338	1098	
44	Michiel Victor	South Africa	392	377	328	1097	
45	Norman Rule	Australia	386	366	366	1095	
46	Sergio Rolandi	Italy	388	369	369	1091	
47	Evald Gering	Canada	385	372	334	1091	
48	Hannan Crystal	Israel	388	356	343	1087	
49	Georgios Liveris	Greece	384	371	332	1087	
50	Rafael Peles	Israel	388	370	326	1084	
51	Bernardo San Juan	Philippines	382	367	334	1083	
52	Gil Boa	Canada	388	358	331	1077	
53	Uffe Schultz Larsen	Denmark	376	359	342	1077	
54	Nikolaos Triantafyllopoulos	Greece	377	358	321	1056	

Key: =WR = equalled world record
