= ISSF 50 meter rifle prone =

Sports shooting event

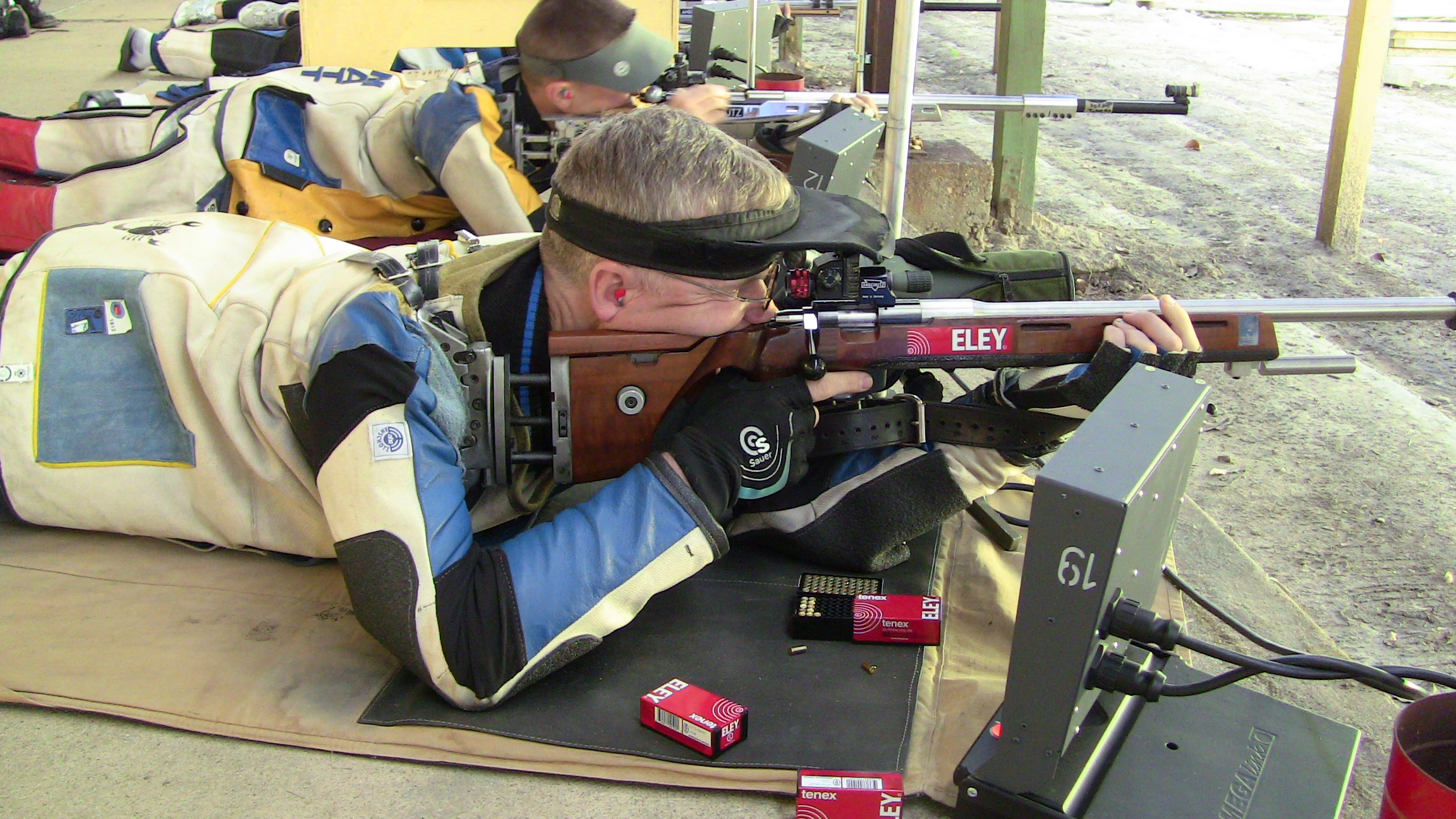

Men
- Number of shots: 60
- Olympic Games: 1908–2016
- World Championships: Since 1929
- Abbreviation: FR60PR

Women
- Number of shots: 60
- Olympic Games: –
- World Championships: Since 1966
- Abbreviation: STR60PR

The target: total Ø = 154.4 mm. 4 ring Ø = 106.4 mm. 9 ring Ø = 26.4 mm. 10 ring Ø = 10.4 mm, height 0.75 m above the floor

50 meter rifle prone (formerly known as one of four free rifle disciplines) is an International Shooting Sport Federation event consisting of 60 shots from the prone position with a .22 Long Rifle (5.6 mm) caliber rifle.

The sport is based on the traditional "English Match" that also consisted of 60 shots in the prone position with a .22 rifle, but had varying distances between 45.7 meters (50.0 yd) and 100 meters (110 yd).

Since 2013 the time limit is 50 minutes for the match, preceded by 15 minutes of sighting and preparation time. If shooting on paper rather than electronic targets, 60 minutes is allowed for match firing.

Before 2017, the men's event was included in the Olympic program but starting with the 2020 Olympics this event has been removed to promote equal gender in Olympic shooting sports. Mixed gender doubles events were introduced to replace this event and two other individual shooting events. Now this event is contested in World Championships only. This includes a final for the top eight competitors. Beginning with the 2013 season, a new finals format was instituted, in which the qualification score is discarded, and the standings among the top eight shooters are determined by their finals scores alone. The course of fire was also changed significantly with the new rules, from the previous 10-shot and then 20-shots program into a 24-shot elimination format, with the lowest ranking shooter eliminated every two shots, starting from the completion of 12th shot.

The women's event has never been included in the Olympic program. It is included in both the ISSF and the CISM World Championships. Since the use of Olympic-style finals was discontinued in 2018, shooters with the same score are separated by a number of tie-breaking criteria, the first being the number of inner tens. Women's rifles may weigh up to 6.5 kilograms (14 lb), as opposed to 8.0 kilograms (17.6 lb) for men, but after the switch from standard rifles to sport rifles this is now the only difference in equipment.

== World Championships, Men ==
Year	Place	Gold	Silver	Bronze
1962	(Egypt) Cairo	Karl Wenk (FRG)	Vladimir Chuian (URS)	James Enoch Hill (USA)
1966	(West Germany) Wiesbaden	David Boyd (USA)	Jerzy Nowicki (POL)	Bill Krilling (USA)
1970	(United States) Phoenix	Manfred Fiess (RSA)	Esa Einari Kervinen (FIN)	Klaus Zähringer (FRG)
1974	(Switzerland) Thun	Karel Bulan (TCH)	Helge Edvin Anshushaug (NOR)	Wolfram Waibel Sr. (AUT)
1978	(South Korea) Seoul	Alister Allan (GBR)	Lones Wigger (USA)	Lanny Bassham (USA)
1982	(Venezuela) Caracas	Victor Daniltchenko (URS)	William Beard (USA)	Viktor Vlasov (URS)
1986	(East Germany) Suhl	Sandor Bereczky (HUN)	Gale Stewart (CAN)	Michael Heine (FRG)
1990	(Soviet Union) Moscow	Viatcheslav Botchkarev (URS)	Harald Stenvaag (NOR)	Tadeusz Czerwinski (POL)
1994	(Italy) Milan	Wenjie Li (CHN)	(Federal Republic of Yugoslavia) Stevan Pletikosic (IOP)	Michel Bury (FRA)
1998	(Spain) Barcelona	Thomas Tamas (USA)	Juha Hirvi (FIN)	Sergei Kovalenko (RUS)
2002	(Finland) Lahti	Matthew Emmons (USA)	Rajmond Debevec (SLO)	Espen Berg-Knutsen (NOR)
2006	(Croatia) Zagreb	Sergei Martynov (BLR)	Jury Sukhorukov (UKR)	Marco de Nicolo (ITA)
2010	(Germany) Munich	Sergei Martynov (BLR)	Valérian Sauveplane (FRA)	Matthew Emmons (USA)
2014	(Spain) Granada	Warren Potent (AUS)	Daniel Brodmeier (GER)	Yury Shcherbatsevich (BLR)
2018	(South Korea) Changwon	Steffen Olsen (DEN)	Stian Bogar (NOR)	Thomas Mathis (AUT)
2022	(Egypt) New Administrative Capital	Jan Lochbihler (SUI)	Liu Yukun (CHN)	Zhao Zhonghao (CHN)

== World Championships, Men Team ==
Year	Place	Gold	Silver	Bronze
1962	(Egypt) Cairo	(Sweden) Sweden; Christer Gustafsson; Kurt Johansson; Jan Emil Poignant; Nils Johan Sundberg	United States; Gary Anderson; James Enoch Hill; Presley Kendall; Verle Franklin Jun. Wright	(West Germany) West Germany; Rudolf Bortz; Peter Kohnke; Karl Wenk; Klaus Zähringer
1966	(West Germany) Wiesbaden	United States; Donald Adams; David Boyd; Bill Krilling; Lones Wigger	(Poland) Poland; Janusz Kalmus; Stanislaw Marucha; Jerzy Nowicki; Andrzej Trajda	(Soviet Union) Soviet Union; Vasily Borisov; Alexander Gerasimenok; Yuri Kudryashov; Marat Niyazov
1970	(United States) Phoenix	(Italy) Italy; Giuseppe de Chirico; Franco Donna; Walter Frescura; Luigi Testarmata	(Romania) Romania; Marin Ferecatu; Ștefan Kaban; Gheorghe Vasilescu; Stefan Tamas	(Socialist Federal Republic of Yugoslavia) Yugoslavia; Dusan Epifanic; Branislav Loncar; Zdravko Milutinovic; Miroslav Sipek
1974	(Switzerland) Thun	(Finland) Finland; Jouko Ilmari Hietalahti; Pauli Aapeli Janhonen; Esa Einari Kervinen; Leif Lajunen	United States; Victor Auer; Presley Kendall; Margaret Murdock; Lones Wigger	(Czechoslovakia) Czechoslovakia; Karel Bulan; Petr Kovářík; Karel Skyba; Jiri Vogler
1978	(South Korea) Seoul	United States; Lanny Bassham; John Comley; Boyd Goldsby; Lones Wigger	(West Germany) West Germany; Kurt Hillenbrand; Ulrich Lind; Karlheinz Smieszek; Werner Seibold	(Switzerland) Switzerland; Hans Braem; Pierre-Alain Dufaux; Anton Mueller; Robert Weilenmann
1982	(Venezuela) Caracas	(Soviet Union) Soviet Union; Victor Daniltchenko; Gennadi Lushikov; Alexander Mitrofanov; Viktor Vlasov	(West Germany) West Germany; Hubert Bichler; Peter Heinz; Ulrich Lind; Werner Seibold	(Austria) Austria; Albert Deuring; Lothar Heinrich; Hannes Rainer; Wolfram Waibel Sr.
1986	(East Germany) Suhl	(Australia) Australia; Donald Brook; Warren Potent; Alan Smith	(East Germany) East Germany; Bernd Hartstein; Mario Gonsierowski; Hellfried Heilfort	(Sweden) Sweden; Christian Heller; Stefan Lövbom; Hans Strand
1990	(Soviet Union) Moscow	(Soviet Union) Soviet Union; Viatcheslav Botchkarev; Gennadi Lushikov; Sergei Martynov	(Czechoslovakia) Czechoslovakia; Jaromir Bures; Vaclav Becvar; Miroslav Varga	(Socialist Federal Republic of Yugoslavia) Yugoslavia; Rajmond Debevec; Goran Maksimović; Nemanja Mirosavljev
1994	(Italy) Milan	(Ukraine) Ukraine; Artur Ayvazyan; Oleg Dementyev; Andriy Sheykin	France; Jean-Pierre Amat; Michel Bury; Dominique Maquin	(Russia) Russia; Viatcheslav Botchkarev; Artem Khadjibekov; Sergei Schedrin
1998	(Spain) Barcelona	United States; Thomas Tamas; Glenn Dubis; Lance Hopper	(Slovakia) Slovakia; Peter Bubernik; Miroslav Svorada; Jozef Gönci	(Italy) Italy; Roberto Vitobello; Marco de Nicolo; Roberto Facheris
2002	(Finland) Lahti	(Norway) Norway; Espen Berg-Knutsen; Vebjørn Berg; Harald Stenvaag	(Ukraine) Ukraine; Oleg Mykhaylov; Artur Ayvazyan; Jury Sukhorukov	(Russia) Russia; Konstantin Prikhodtchenko; Sergei Kovalenko; Artem Khadjibekov
2006	(Croatia) Zagreb	United States; Michael McPhail; Eric Uptagrafft; Matthew Emmons	(Austria) Austria; Mario Knögler; Christian Planer; Alexander Uhl	(Hungary) Hungary; Péter Sidi; Tibor Gabor Mlinkovics; Szabolcs Herczegh
2010	(Germany) Munich	United States; Michael McPhail; Eric Uptagrafft; Matthew Emmons	(South Korea) South Korea; Han Jinseop; Kim Jonghyun; Kim Hakman	(Russia) Russia; Artem Khadjibekov; Konstantin Prikhodtchenko; Dmitry Ponomarev
2014	(Spain) Granada	(China); Zhao Shengbo; Lan Xing; Liu Gang	(Belarus) Belarus; Sergei Martynov; Yuri Shcherbatsevich; Vitali Bubnovich	(Serbia) Serbia; Stevan Pletikosić; Milenko Sebić; Nemanja Mirosavljev
2018	(South Korea) Changwon	(Germany); Daniel Brodmeier; Christoph Kaulich; Maximilian Dallinger	United States; Michael McPhail; Matthew Emmons; Lucas Kozeniesky	(China); Zhao Zhonghao; Sun Jian; Liu Gang

== World Championships, Women ==
Year	Place	Gold	Silver	Bronze
1966	(West Germany) Wiesbaden	Eulalia Zakrzewska (POL)	Margaret Thompson (USA)	Ferencne Kun (HUN)
1970	(United States) Phoenix	Desanka Perović (YUG)	Ann de Vos (RSA)	Margareta Gustafsson (SWE)
1974	(Switzerland) Thun	Margaret Murdock (USA)	Christina Gustafsson (SWE)	Nonka Shatarova (BUL)
1978	(South Korea) Seoul	Sue Ann Sandusky (USA)	Dominique Esnault (FRA)	Karen Monez (USA)
1982	(Venezuela) Caracas	Sirpa Ylönen (FIN)	Yvonne Hill (AUS)	Svetlana Komaristova (URS)
1986	(East Germany) Suhl	Eva Forian (HUN)	Nonka Matova (BUL)	Roxana Lamasanu (ROM)
1990	(Soviet Union) Moscow	Iryna Shylava (URS)	Valentina Cherkasova (URS)	Lessia Leskiv (URS)
1994	(Italy) Milan	Petra Horneber (GER)	Beth Herzman (USA)	Nieves Fernandez (ESP)
1998	(Spain) Barcelona	Marina Bobkova (RUS)	Xian Wang (CHN)	Elizabeth Bourland (USA)
2002	(Finland) Lahti	Olga Dovgun (KAZ)	Xian Wang (CHN)	Natallia Kalnysh (UKR)
2006	(Croatia) Zagreb	Olga Dovgun (KAZ)	Hanne Skarpodde (NOR)	Varvara Kovalenko (KAZ)
2010	(Germany) Munich	Tejaswini Sawant (IND)	Joanna Nowakowska (POL)	Olga Dovgun (KAZ)
2014	(Spain) Granada	Beate Gauss (GER)	Chen Dongqi (CHN)	Esmari Van Reenen (RSA)
2018	(South Korea) Changwon	Seonaid McIntosh (GBR)	Isabella Straub (GER)	Daniela Demjen Peskova (SVK)
2022	(Egypt) New Administrative Capital	Jolyn Beer (GER)	Sarina Hitz (SUI)	Mary Carolynn Tucker (USA)

== World Championships, Women Team ==
Year	Place	Gold	Silver	Bronze
1966	(West Germany) Wiesbaden	(Poland) Poland; Barbara Kopyt; Bozena Wzietek; Eulalia Zakrzewska	United States; Marianne Jensen; Patricia Kinsella; Margaret Thompson	(Hungary) Hungary; Oszkarne Kellner; Lajosne Kisgyorgy; Ferencne Kun
1970	(United States) Phoenix	(Socialist Federal Republic of Yugoslavia) Yugoslavia; Magdalena Herold; Mirjana Masic; Desanka Perovic	(West Germany) West Germany; Ingrid Kappes; Gerlinde Popp; Anneliese Rhomberg	(Soviet Union) Soviet Union; Tamara Cherkasova; Lucia Fagereva; Tatiana Ratnikova
1974	(Switzerland) Thun	United States; Schuyler Helbing; Margaret Murdock; Diana Zimmermann	(Socialist Federal Republic of Yugoslavia) Yugoslavia; Mirjana Masic; Desanka Pesut; Valeria Sabatka	(Sweden) Sweden; Margareta Gustafsson; Christina Gustafsson; Brita Raning
1978	(South Korea) Seoul	United States; Karen Monez; Wanda Oliver; Sue Ann Sandusky	France; Yvette Courault; Dominique Esnault; Elisabeth Lesou	(Australia) Australia; Tricia van Nus; Sylvia Muehlberg; Tracey Smith
1982	(Venezuela) Caracas	(Australia) Australia; Yvonne Gowland; Yvonne Hill; Sylvia Muehlberg	(Soviet Union) Soviet Union; Svetlana Komaristova; Lessia Leskiv; Tatiana Sytcheva	France; Yvette Courault; Dominique Esnault; Isabelle Heberle
1986	(East Germany) Suhl	(Socialist Federal Republic of Yugoslavia) Yugoslavia; Vesna Domazet; Mirjana Jovovic; Biserka Vrbek	(Bulgaria) Bulgaria; Petja Doudekova; Vesela Letcheva; Nonka Matova	(Sweden) Sweden; Anette Andersson; Margareta Gustafsson; Christina Gustafsson
1990	(Soviet Union) Moscow	(Soviet Union) Soviet Union; Valentina Cherkasova; Lessia Leskiv; Iryna Shylava	(Bulgaria) Bulgaria; Vesela Letcheva; Nonka Matova; Milena Spasova	United States; Tammie Deangles; Launi Meili; Kristen Peterson
1994	(Italy) Milan	(Russia) Russia; Valentina Cherkasova; Irina Gerasimenok; Anna Maloukhina	(Norway) Norway; Lindy Hansen; Grethe Martinsen; Hanne Vataker	(Ukraine) Ukraine; Lessia Leskiv; Tatiana Nesterova; Olga Cheremska
1998	(Spain) Barcelona	(Russia) Russia; Marina Bobkova; Irina Gerasimenok; Tatiana Goldobina	(China); Xian Wang; Yinghui Zhao; Hong Shan	(Ukraine) Ukraine; Lessia Leskiv; Olga Larina; Olena Davydova
2002	(Finland) Lahti	(Finland) Finland; Viivi Villa; Jenni Ranta; Helena Juppala	(Denmark) Denmark; Pia Jakobsen; Anni Bissoe; Charlotte Jakobsen	(Germany); Britta Grossecappenberg; Petra Horneber; Sonja Pfeilschifter
2006	(Croatia) Zagreb	(Germany); Sonja Pfeilschifter; Dorothee Bauer; Claudia Keck	(Kazakhstan) Kazakhstan; Galina Korchma; Olga Dovgun; Varvara Kovalenko	(Ukraine) Ukraine; Natallia Kalnysh; Olena Davydova; Lessia Leskiv
2010	(Germany) Munich	(Switzerland) Switzerland; Aurelie Grangier; Annik Marguet; Irene Beyeler	(Germany); Eva Friedel; Sonja Pfeilschifter; Nicole Stenzenberger	(South Korea) South Korea; Kim Yooyeon; Jeong Mira; Kwon Nara
2014	(Spain) Granada	(Germany); Beate Gauss; Barbara Engleder; Isabella Straub	(China); Chen Dongqi; Chang Jing; Yi Siling	(Ukraine) Ukraine; Lessia Leskiv; Natallia Kalnysh; Olga Golubchenko
2018	(South Korea) Changwon	(Germany); Jaqueline Orth; Isabella Straub; Amelie Kleinmanns	(Denmark) Denmark; Stine Nielsen; Rikki Maeng Ibsen; Stephanie Laura Scurrah Grundsoee	(United Kingdom) Great Britain; Seonaid McIntosh; Jennifer McIntosh; Zoe Anne Bruce

== World Championships, Mixed Team ==
Year	Place	Gold	Silver	Bronze
2022	(Egypt) New Administrative Capital	United States; Sagen Maddalena; Ivan Roe	Ukraine; Daria Tykhova; Serhiy Kulish	Germany; Jolyn Beer; Maximilian Dallinger

== World Championships, total medals ==
Rank	Nation	Gold	Silver	Bronze	Total
1	United States	11	7	6	24
2	Soviet Union	6	3	5	14
3	Yugoslavia	3	2	2	7
4	Finland	3	2	0	5
5	Russia	3	0	3	6
6	Poland	2	2	1	5
7	Australia	2	1	1	4
7	Kazakhstan	2	1	1	4
9	Hungary	2	0	3	5
10	Germany	2	0	1	3
11	Norway	1	4	1	6
12	West Germany	1	3	3	7
13	China	1	3	0	4
14	Ukraine	1	2	4	7
15	Sweden	1	1	4	6
16	Czechoslovakia	1	1	1	3
17	South Africa	1	1	0	2
18	Italy	1	0	2	3
19	Belarus	1	0	0	1
19	Great Britain	1	0	0	1
21	France	0	3	2	5
22	Bulgaria	0	3	1	4
23	Austria	0	1	2	3
24	Romania	0	1	1	2
25	Canada	0	1	0	1
25	Denmark	0	1	0	1
25	East Germany	0	1	0	1
25	Slovakia	0	1	0	1
25	Slovenia	0	1	0	1
30	Spain	0	0	1	1
30	Switzerland	0	0	1	1
Totals (31 entries)		46	46	46	138

== Current world records ==
=== Pre 2013 World Records ===
Pre 2013 world records in 50 meter rifle prone
Men
Men	Individual	705.5	Sergei Martynov (BLR) (600+105.5)	3 August 2012	London (UK)
Men	Teams	1793	Austria (Knögler, Planer, Waibel)	July 19, 2003	Plzeň (CZE)
Junior Men	Individual	600	Stevan Pletikosić (YUG)	August 29, 1991	Munich (GER)
Junior Men	Teams	1770	United Kingdom (Thomson, Parr, Phillips)	July, 10 2006	Zagreb (CRO) Zagreb
Junior Men	Teams	1778	Germany (Boschenrieder, Hahn, Junghaenel)	July 9, 2008	Plzeň (CZE)
Women	Individual	597	Marina Bobkova (RUS); Olga Dovgun (KAZ); Olga Dovgun (KAZ); Olga Dovgun (KAZ)	July 19, 1998; July 4, 2002; October 4, 2002; July 29, 2006	Barcelona (ESP); Lahti (FIN); Busan (KOR); Zagreb (CRO)
Women	Teams	1786	Soviet Union (Cherkasova, Leskiv, Shylava)	August 15, 1990	Moscow (URS)
Junior Women	Individual	598	Katja Böttinger (GER)	August 3, 2000	Plzeň (CZE)
Junior Women	Teams	1771	Sweden (Bengtsson, Karlsson, Säker)	July 14, 2009	Osijek (CRO)

=== Current World Records ===
Current world records in 50 meter rifle prone
Men	Individual	633.0	Sergey Kamenskiy (RUS)	July 21, 2015	Maribor (SLO)
Men	Teams	1878.3	Poland (Majka, Bartnik, Romańczyk)	September 16, 2019	Bologna (ITA)
Junior Men	Individual	629.3	Christoph Kaulich (GER)	September 16, 2014	Granada (ESP)
Junior Men	Teams	1865.6	Austria (Thum, Wadlegger, Diem)	June 24, 2017	Suhl (GER)
Women (ISSF)	Individual	628.5	Beate Gauss (GER)	September 14, 2014	Granada (ESP)
Women (ISSF)	Teams	1871.6	Russia (Zykova, Ivanova, Khorosheva)	September 16, 2019	Bologna (ITA)
Women (CISM)	Individual	625.5	Bae So-hee (KOR)	14 November 2016	Doha (QAT)
Women (CISM)	Teams	1861.0	China (Wan, Yin, Gao); Germany (Müller, Beer, Rachl)	14 November 2016; 14 November 2016	Doha (QAT); Doha (QAT)
Junior Women	Individual	627.9	Jeanette Hegg Duestad (NOR)	July 14, 2019	Suhl (GER)
Junior Women	Teams	1865.5	Norway (Duestad, Stette, Engevik)	July 14, 2019	Suhl (GER)
