= Shooting at the 1968 Summer Olympics – Mixed 50 metre rifle prone =

Mixed 50 metre rifle, prone at the Games of the XIX Olympiad
- Venue: Mexico City, Mexico
- Date: 19 October 1968
- Competitors: 86 from 46 nations

Medalists
1st place, gold medalist(s)		Jan Kůrka	Czechoslovakia
2nd place, silver medalist(s)		László Hammerl	Hungary
3rd place, bronze medalist(s)		Ian Ballinger	New Zealand

The mixed 50 metre rifle, prone was a shooting sports event held as part of the Shooting at the 1968 Summer Olympics programme. It was the eleventh appearance of the event. The competition was held on 19 October 1968 at the shooting ranges in Mexico City. 86 shooters from 46 nations competed.

== Results ==
Place	Shooter	Total
1	Jan Kůrka (TCH)	598
2	László Hammerl (HUN)	598
3	Ian Ballinger (NZL)	597
4	Nicolae Rotaru (ROU)	597
5	John Palin (GBR)	596
6	Jean-Luc Loret (FRA)	596
7	Bjørn Bakken (NOR)	595
8	Gary Anderson (USA)	595
9	Alister Allan (GBR)	595
10	Frans Lafortune (BEL)	595
11	Silvio Delgado (CUB)	594
12	Stew Nairn (NZL)	594
13	Karl Wenk (FRG)	594
14	Rudolf Pojer (TCH)	594
15	Ole Hviid Jensen (DEN)	594
16	Valentin Kornev (URS)	594
17	Sven Johansson (SWE)	594
18	Olegario Vázquez (MEX)	594
19	Elling Øvergård (NOR)	593
20	Gerry Ouellette (CAN)	593
21	Jerzy Nowicki (POL)	593
22	Eulalia Rolińska (POL)	593
23	Hansruedi Schafroth (SUI)	593
24	Martsel Koen (BUL)	592
25	Lones Wigger (USA)	592
26	Kurt Johansson (SWE)	592
27	Marin Ferecatu (ROU)	592
28	Nehemia Sirkis (ISR)	591
29	Jesús Elizondo (MEX)	591
30	Lambis Manthos (GRE)	591
31	Gladys Baldwin (PER)	591
32	André Noël (FRA)	591
33	Klaus Zähringer (FRG)	591
34	Edmar de Salles (BRA)	590
35	Friedrich Schattleitner (AUT)	590
36	Vitaly Parkhimovich (URS)	590
37	José Luis Calvo (ESP)	590
38	Rudy Schulze (CAN)	590
39	Durval Guimarães (BRA)	589
40	Jaakko Minkkinen (FIN)	589
41	Branislav Lončar (YUG)	589
42	Per Weichel (DEN)	589
43	Giuseppe De Chirico (ITA)	589
44	Enrico Forcella (VEN)	588
45	Henry Herscovici (ISR)	588
46	Lajos Papp (HUN)	588
47	Ralph Rodríguez (PUR)	588
48	Jaime Villafuerte (PHI)	587
49	Ioannis Skarafingas (GRE)	587
50	Simo Morri (FIN)	587
51	Mehmet Dursun (TUR)	587
52	Carlos Pacheco (CRC)	587
53	Wolfram Waibel, Sr. (AUT)	587
54	Hartmut Sommer (GDR)	587
55	Boris Loginow (VEN)	586
56	Werner Heyn (GDR)	586
57	Udomsak Theinthong (THA)	586
58	Hans Sinniger (SUI)	586
59	Wu Tao-yan (ROC)	585
60	Hiromu Sekine (JPN)	585
61	Enrique Guedes (CUB)	585
62	Dušan Epifanić (YUG)	585
63	Robert Hulse (HBR)	584
64	Velichko Velichkov (BUL)	584
65	Hugh Homer (TTO)	583
66	Hugo Chamberlain (CRC)	583
67	Adolfo Feliciano (PHI)	583
68	Dismus Onyiego (KEN)	583
69	Yondonjamtsyn Batsükh (MGL)	582
70	Alberto Santiago (PUR)	582
71	Peter Rull, Sr. (HKG)	582
72	Milton Tucker (BAR)	581
73	Mendbayaryn Jantsankhorloo (MGL)	581
74	Tomás Vilanova (ESA)	581
75	Choomphol Chaiyanitr (THA)	580
76	John Harun (KEN)	580
77	José Lei (HKG)	580
78	Otto Brolo (GUA)	580
79	Pablo Sittler (GUA)	579
80	Tai Chao-chih (ROC)	578
81	Ricardo Menéndez (ESA)	578
82	José del Villar (ESP)	577
83	Joe Barral (MON)	577
84	Shigemi Saito (JPN)	576
85	Gilbert Scorsoglio (MON)	573
86	Edward Anderson (HBR)	562
