= Yugoslavia at the 1959 Mediterranean Games =

- IOC code: YUG
- NOC: Yugoslav Olympic Committee

in Beirut
- Medals Ranked 5th: Gold 11 Silver 9 Bronze 8 Total 28

Mediterranean Games appearances (overview)
- 1951; 1955; 1959; 1963; 1967; 1971; 1975; 1979; 1983; 1987; 1991

Other related appearances
- Bosnia and Herzegovina (1993–); Croatia (1993–); Slovenia (1993–); Serbia and Montenegro (1997–2005); Montenegro (2009–); Serbia (2009–); North Macedonia (2013–); Kosovo (2018–)

Yugoslavia competed at the 1959 Mediterranean Games held in Beirut, Lebanon.

== Medalists ==
Medal	Name	Sport	Event
Gold	Viktor Šnajder	Athletics	400m
Gold	Krešimir Račić	Athletics	Hammer throw
Gold	Janez Brodnik	Athletics	Decathlon
Gold	Water polo team: Đuro Radan Pero Katušić Hrvoje Kačić Boris Čukvas Božidar Stanišić Ante Nardeli Zlatko Šimenc Zdravko Ježić Ivo Cipci Gojko Arneri Lovro Radonjić (Team coached by Božo Grkinić)	Water polo	Men's tournament
Gold	Basketball team: Slobodan Gordić Ivo Daneu Sreten Dragojlović Nemanja Đurić Marjan Kandus Miodrag Nikolić Branko Radović Radovan Radović Milutin Minja Željko Troskot Bogdan Müller (Team coached by Aleksandar Nikolić)	Basketball	Men's tournament
Gold	Vlado Brinovec	Swimming	400m Freestyle
Gold	Stevan Horvat	Wrestling	Greco-Roman 78 kg
Gold	Josip Ćuk	Shooting	trap
Gold	Josip Ćuk	Shooting	50 metre rifle standing
Gold	Branislav Lončar	Shooting	50 metre rifle kneeling
Gold	Branislav Lončar	Shooting	50 metre rifle prone
Silver	Božidar Miletić	Athletics	Javelin throw
Silver	Dako Radošević	Athletics	Discus throw
Silver	Janez Kocmur	Swimming	100m Freestyle
Silver	Milan Jeger	Swimming	400m Freestyle
Silver	Vlado Brinovec	Swimming	1500m Freestyle
Silver	Mihovil Dorčić	Swimming	100m Backstroke
Silver	Ante Nardeli, Vlado Brinovec, Janez Kocmur, Milan Jeger	Swimming	4x200m Freestyle
Silver	Borivoje Vukov	Wrestling	Greco-Roman 52 kg
Silver	Branislav Lončar	Shooting	50 metre rifle three positions
Bronze	Franc Hafner	Athletics	3000m Steeplechase
Bronze	Mihovil Doričić, Đuro Radan, Ante Nardeli, Janez Kocmur	Swimming	4x100m Medley
Bronze	Edo Delorenco	Shooting	50 metre pistol
Bronze	Miroslav Stojanović	Shooting	50 metre rifle three positions
Bronze	Miroslav Stojanović	Shooting	50 metre rifle standing
Bronze	Miroslav Stojanović	Shooting	50 metre rifle kneeling
Bronze	Josip Ćuk	Shooting	50 metre rifle prone
Bronze	Branislav Lončar	Shooting	trap

== Medals by sport ==
Sport	Gold	Silver	Bronze	Total
Shooting	4	1	6	11
Athletics	3	2	1	6
Swimming	1	5	1	7
Wrestling	1	1	0	2
Basketball	1	0	0	1
Water polo	1	0	0	1
Totals (6 entries)	11	9	8	28
