= Peter Rull =

Peter Rull may refer to:

- Peter Rull Sr. (1922–2014), Hong Kong sports shooter
- Peter Rull Jr. (1945–2026), Hong Kong sports shooter
