= Rull (disambiguation) =

Rull is a municipality in the southern part of the island Yap, Federated States of Micronesia.

Rull may also refer to:

== People ==
- Bartolomé Rull (1691–1769), bishop of Malta
- Ernst-Eduard Rull (1894–1986), Estonian sport shooter
- Johann Baptist Ruel (also called de Ruel or de Rull; 1634–1685), Flemish painter
- Josep Rull (born 1968), Spanish politician from Catalonia
- Peter Rull Sr. (1922–2014), Olympian sport shooter
- Peter Rull Jr. (born 1945), Olympian sport shooter

== Other ==
- Rudl or rull, a Norwegian folk dance
