= Rolandi =

Rolandi is a surname. Notable people with the surname include:

- Carlo Rolandi (1926–2020), Italian sailor
- Gianna Rolandi (1952–2021), American soprano
- Sergio Rolandi (1927–1995), Italian sport shooter
