= Yvonne Hill =

Australian sport shooter (born 1937)

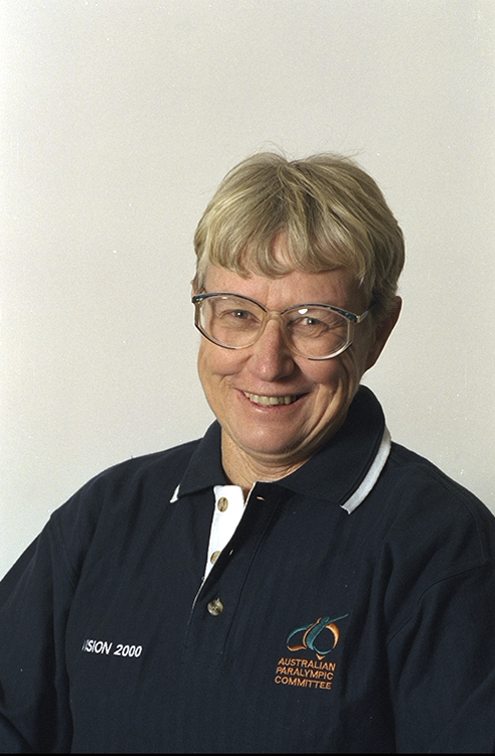

Personal information
- Nationality: Australian
- Born: 24 July 1937 (age 88) Stirling, South Australia

Sport
- Country: Australia
- Sport: Sport shooting

Yvonne Avis Hill OAM (born 24 July 1937) is an Australian sport shooter and coach.

== Personal ==
She was born in Stirling, South Australia. She was Deputy Principal at Morialta High School and Nailsworth Girls High and principal at Balaklava High School, where she was the first female principal.

In 2015, she was awarded Order of Australia Medal (OAM) for service to competitive rifle and pistol shooting, and to the community.

Besides her shooting career, Hill is a photographer and volunteer with South Australia Sea Rescue Squadron.

In 2025, Hill published her autobiography Bullseye.

== Major Competitions ==
=== Olympic Games ===
She competed at the 1980 Summer Olympics in Moscow, in mixed 50 metre rifle prone and finished eleventh with 596 points. Hill competed after successfully being granted an injunction in the Supreme Court of South Australia preventing the Australian Shooting Association's (ASA) from withdrawing her name from the Australian team. The ASA decision to withdraw selected athletes was a result of pressure from the Fraser governmernt for Australia to boycott the 1980 Games. Hill at the time was described as a "forty-three year old widowed mother of three, and one of Australia's finest shooters". Hill stated that "The ASA has no moral right to withdraw any individual . I took a big risk, I know that. Undoubtably I will antagonise a lot of people. I only hope I do not cause more divisiness than the Australian Government has done by calling an Olympic boycott." Her decision led to the Adelaide Advertiser attacking her in an editorial.

Hill was the oldest Australian Olympian to attend the 2025 event at Federal Parliament to recognise the 1980 Australian Olympic Team.

=== Commonwealth Games ===
She competed in two events at the 1982 Commonwealth Games in Brisbane, she finished seventh in 50m Prone with 1173 points and fourth in the 50m Prone Pair with 1179 points.

=== World Championships ===
Hill won a gold medal in the Women's standard English rifle match with Sylvia Muehlberg and Yvonne Gowland and a silver medal in the Women's 50 meter rifle prone at the 1982 World Championships.

== Coaching career ==
Coaching career appointments included:

- Paralympic athletes - coached Barbara Caspers to four gold medals at 1984 New York/Stoke Mandeville Games,1994 World Disabled Games, 1996 Paralympic Games and 2000 Paralympic Games
- 1994 Comnmonwealth Games Smallbore team
