= Manuel da Costa =

Manuel da Costa may refer to:

- Manuel da Costa (bibliographer), Portuguese Jesuit and bibliographer
- Manuel da Costa (equestrian) (1946–2014), Portuguese Olympic equestrian
- Manuel da Costa (footballer, born 1986), Moroccan footballer
- Manuel da Costa (sport shooter) (1926–2020), Portuguese Olympic shooter
- Manuel da Costa (footballer, born 1916), Portuguese footballer
