= Inokuma =

Inokuma (written: 猪熊) is a Japanese surname. Notable people with the surname include:

- Genichiro Inokuma (1902–1993), Japanese painter
- Isao Inokuma (猪熊 功, 1938–2001), Japanese judoka
- Yukio Inokuma (born 1920), Japanese sport shooter

== Fictional characters ==
- Youko Inokuma (猪熊 陽子), character in the anime/manga series Kin-iro Mosaic
- Kota Inokuma (猪熊 空太), character in the anime/manga series Kin-iro Mosaic
- Mitsuki Inokuma (猪熊 美月), character in the anime/manga series Kin-iro Mosaic
