= Pedro Medina =

Pedro Medina is the name of:

- Pedro Medina (baseball)
- Pedro Medina (murderer)
- Pedro Medina (sport shooter)
- Pedro Medina Avendaño
- Pedro Medina Romero
