= Triantafyllopoulos =

Triantafilopoulos or Triantafyllopoulos (Greek: Τριανταφυλλόπουλος, lit. 'son of Triantafyllos') is a Greek surname. The feminine form is Triantafyllopoulou. It can refer to:

- Effie Triantafilopoulos, Canadian politician
- Konstantinos Triantafyllopoulos (born 1983), Greek footballer
- Kostas Triantafyllopoulos (1956–2021), Greek actor
- Makis Triantafyllopoulos (born 1954), Greek journalist
- Nikolaos Triantafyllopoulos (1918–1998), Greek sports shooter
