= Tang Peng Choi =

Malaysian sports shooter

Personal information
- Born: 14 June 1924

Chinese name
- Traditional Chinese: 鄧炳才
- Simplified Chinese: 邓炳才
- Hanyu Pinyin: Dèng Bǐngcái
- Yale Romanization: Dahng Bíngchòih
- Jyutping: Dang6 Bing2choi4

Sport
- Sport: Sports shooting

Tang Peng Choi (鄧炳才; born 14 June 1924) is a Malaysian former sports shooter. He competed in the 50 metre rifle, prone event at the 1964 Summer Olympics.

Tang is from Selangor. He represented the Federation of Malaya at the 1959 and 1961 Southeast Asian Peninsular Games, winning bronze at the latter in the three positions event. He ranked first in the Malaysian domestic selection trials for shooting at the 1966 Asian Games, and was assigned to the prone rifle team along with Tan Seng Keat, Wong Foo Wah, and Chan Kooi Chye. He later represented Malaysia at the first Asian Shooting Championships in 1967.
