= José Cazorla =

José Cazorla may refer to:

- José Cazorla Maure (1903–1940), Spanish communist leader during the Spanish Civil War (1936–39)
- José Cazorla (sport shooter) (born 1914), Venezuelan sports shooter
