= Javier Caceres =

Javier Caceres may refer to:

- Javier Cáceres (footballer) (born 1939), Peruvian footballer
- Javier Caceres (sport shooter) (1925–2021), Peruvian sport shooter
