= Mariano Antonelli =

Italian sports shooter

Personal information
- Born: 24 June 1933 Campotosto, Italy
- Died: 29 September 2006 (aged 73)

Sport
- Sport: Sports shooting

Mariano Antonelli (24 June 1933 – 29 September 2006) was an Italian sports shooter. He competed in the 50 metre rifle, prone event at the 1960 Summer Olympics.
