= Tor Richter =

Norwegian sports shooter (1938–2010)

Personal information
- Born: 20 April 1938 Stjørdal Municipality, Norway
- Died: 30 September 2010 (aged 72) Stjørdal, Norway

Sport
- Sport: Sports shooting

Tor Richter (20 April 1938 – 30 September 2010) was a Norwegian sports shooter. He competed in the 50 metre rifle, prone event at the 1960 Summer Olympics.
