= Rudolf Bortz =

German sports shooter

Personal information
- Born: 22 June 1938 (age 87) Yushny, Soviet Union

Sport
- Sport: Sports shooting
- Event: 50 metre rifle prone

Rudolf Bortz (born 22 June 1938) is a German former sports shooter. He competed in the 50 metre rifle, prone event at the 1964 Summer Olympics.
