= Moustafa Chellouf =

Tunisian sports shooter

Personal information
- Born: 21 March 1935 (age 91) Sfax, Tunisia

Sport
- Sport: Sports shooting

Moustafa Chellouf (born 21 March 1935) is a Tunisian former sports shooter. He competed in the 50 metre rifle, prone event at the 1960 Summer Olympics.
