= Michael Ron =

Israeli fencer

Personal information
- Native name: מיכאל רון
- Born: 15 August 1932 (age 93)

Sport
- Sport: Fencing

Michael Ron (Hebrew: מיכאל רון; born 15 August 1932) is a retired Israeli fencer. He competed in the individual sabre event at the 1960 Summer Olympics at the age of 28. He was eliminated in Round One after he won one bout (defeating Mohamed Ben Joullon of Morocco) and lost four.
