= Enrique Guedes =

Cuban sports shooter

Personal information
- Born: 17 July 1932 (age 93) Las Villas, Cuba

Sport
- Sport: Sports shooting

Enrique Guedes (born 17 July 1932) is a Cuban former sports shooter. He competed in the 50 metre rifle, prone event at the 1968 Summer Olympics.
