= Traian Cogut =

Romanian sports shooter

Personal information
- Born: 7 May 1948 (age 78) Iași, Romania

Sport
- Sport: Sports shooting

Traian Cogut (born 7 May 1948) is a Romanian former sports shooter. He competed in the 50 metre rifle, prone event at the 1964 Summer Olympics.
