= Paulino Díaz =

Mexican sports shooter

Personal information
- Born: 12 January 1935 Guadalajara, Mexico
- Died: 26 June 2006 (aged 71)

Sport
- Sport: Sports shooting

Paulino Díaz (12 January 1935 – 26 June 2006) was a Mexican sports shooter. He competed in the 50 metre rifle, prone event at the 1960 Summer Olympics.
