= Hugh Homer =

Trinidad sports shooter

Personal information
- Born: 23 November 1935 (age 90) Port of Spain, Trinidad and Tobago

Sport
- Sport: Sports shooting

Hugh Homer (born 23 November 1935) is a Trinidad and Tobago former sports shooter. He competed in the 50 metre rifle, prone event at the 1968 Summer Olympics.
