= Karl Wenk =

German sports shooter

Personal information
- Born: 20 December 1934 (age 91) Lörrach, Germany

Sport
- Sport: Sports shooting
- Event: 50 metre rifle prone

Karl Wenk (born 20 December 1934) is a German former sports shooter. He competed in the 50 metre rifle prone events at the 1964 Summer Olympics and the 1968 Summer Olympics.

== Olympic Games ==
1964 Summer Olympics in Tokyo, competing for the United Team of Germany:

- Shooting – Men's 50 metre rifle, prone – 7th place

1968 Summer Olympics in Mexico City, competing for the West Germany:

- Shooting – Mixed 50 metre rifle, prone – 13th place
