= Albino da Silva =

Portuguese sports shooter

Personal information
- Full name: Albino Roque da Silva
- Born: 9 January 1925 Porto, Portugal

Sport
- Sport: Sports shooting

Albino da Silva (born 9 January 1925) is a Portuguese former sports shooter. He competed in the 50 metre rifle, prone event at the 1960 Summer Olympics.
