= Alberto Santiago =

Puerto Rican sports shooter

Personal information
- Born: 4 June 1933 (age 93) Ponce, Puerto Rico

Sport
- Sport: Sports shooting

Alberto Santiago (born 4 June 1933) is a Puerto Rican former sports shooter. He competed in the 50 metre rifle, prone event at the 1968 Summer Olympics.
