= Tai Chao-chih =

Taiwanese sports shooter (born 1930)

Personal information
- Born: 13 March 1930 Muyang, Taiwan

Sport
- Sport: Sports shooting

Tai Chao-chih (Chinese: 戴兆智; pinyin: Dài Zhàozhì; born 13 March 1930) is a Taiwanese former sports shooter. He competed at the 1964 Summer Olympics and the 1968 Summer Olympics. He also competed at the 1966 Asian Games and won a bronze medal in the team event.

== Olympic results ==
Games	Competition	Result	Place	Source
1964 Summer Olympics	Shooting at the 1964 Summer Olympics – Men's 50 metre rifle prone	581 points (97-94-97-97-98-98)	54	
1968 Summer Olympics	Shooting at the 1968 Summer Olympics – Mixed 50 metre rifle prone	578 points (97-96-97-96-95-97)	80	
