= António Tavares (sport shooter) =

Portuguese sports shooter

Personal information
- Born: 31 May 1932 (age 94) Torres Vedras, Portugal

Sport
- Sport: Sports shooting

António Tavares (born 31 May 1932) is a Portuguese former sports shooter. He competed in the 50 metre rifle, three positions event at the 1960 Summer Olympics.
