= Hongsa Purnaveja =

Thai sports shooter

Personal information
- Born: 28 March 1928

Sport
- Sport: Sports shooting

Hongsa Purnaveja (born 28 March 1928) is a Thai former sports shooter. He competed in the 50 metre rifle, prone event at the 1964 Summer Olympics.
