= John Hall (sport shooter) =

British sports shooter

Personal information
- Born: 12 November 1906
- Died: 1978 (aged 71–72) Leeds, England

Sport
- Sport: Sports shooting

John Hall (12 November 1906 – 1978) was a British sports shooter. He competed in the 50 metre rifle, prone event at the 1964 Summer Olympics. He won a silver medal in the 50 metre prone rifle event at the 1963 European Shooting Championships in Oslo.
