= Franco Donna =

Italian sport shooter

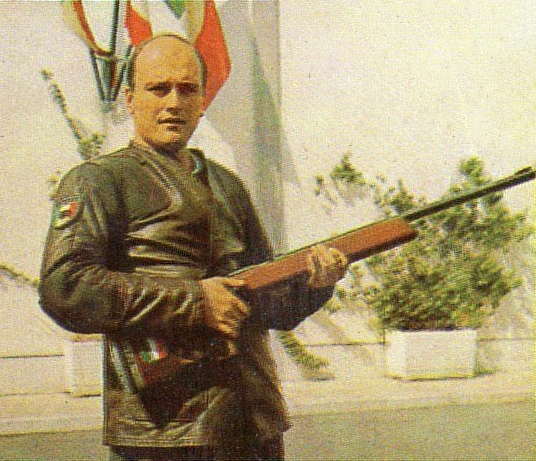
- Franco Donna c. 1972

Personal information
- Born: Italy

Sport
- Sport: Shooting
- Event: Rifle
Medal record
Representing Italy
ISSF World Shooting Championships
Gold medal – first place	1970 Phoenix	50 meter rifle prone, team
European Shooting Championships
Gold medal – first place	1969 Plzeň	Rifle, three positions

Franco Donna is a retired Italian rifle shooter. He won the individual European title in three positions in 1969 and the team world title in the 50 meter rifle prone in 1970.
