= Rafael Peles =

Israeli sports shooter

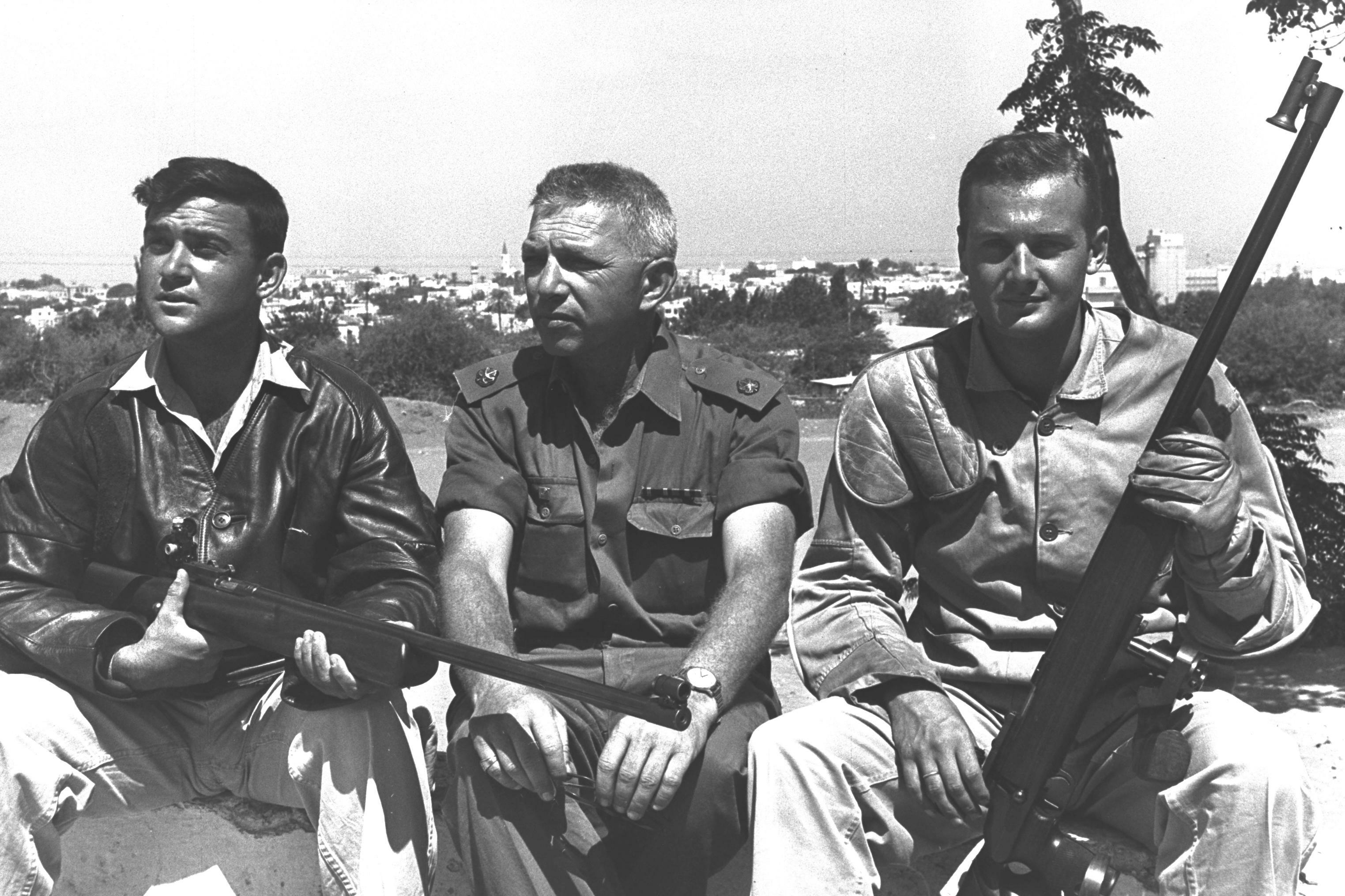
- L-R, Hannan Crystal, trainer Izzy Gilam, and Rafael Peles

Personal information
- Native name: רפאל פלס
- Born: 1936 (age 89–90) Netherlands

Sport
- Sport: Sports shooting

Rafael Peles (Hebrew: רפאל פלס; (1936 - July 2026) was an Israeli former sports shooter. He competed in the 50 metre rifle, three positions and 50 metre rifle, prone events at the 1960 Summer Olympics.
