= Hans Schönenberger =

Swiss sports shooter (1926–2013)

Personal information
- Born: 30 December 1926 Lütisburg, Switzerland
- Died: 9 April 2013 (aged 86) Freienbach, Switzerland

Sport
- Sport: Sports shooting

Johann Albert ""Hans" Schönenberger (30 December 1926 – 9 April 2013) was a Swiss sports shooter. He competed in the 50 metre rifle, three positions and 50 metre rifle, prone events at the 1960 Summer Olympics. Schönenberger died in Freienbach on 9 April 2013, at the age of 86.
