= Manoel da Silva =

Portuguese sports shooter (born 1919)

Personal information
- Full name: Manoel Pereira da Silva
- Born: 1 June 1919 Braga, Portugal

Sport
- Sport: Sports shooting

Manoel Pereira da Silva (born 1 June 1919, date of death unknown) was a Portuguese sports shooter. He competed in the 50 metre rifle, three positions event at the 1960 Summer Olympics. Silva is deceased.
