= Pablo Sittler =

Guatemalan sports shooter

Personal information
- Born: 18 February 1925 France
- Died: 22 February 2008 (aged 83)

Sport
- Sport: Sports shooting

Pablo Sittler (18 February 1925 – 22 February 2008) was a Guatemalan sports shooter. He competed in the 50 metre rifle, prone event at the 1968 Summer Olympics.
