= Dušan Epifanić =

Yugoslav sports shooter

Personal information
- Born: 12 August 1945 (age 81) Farkaždin, Yugoslavia

Sport
- Sport: Sports shooting

Dušan Epifanić (born 12 August 1945) is a Yugoslav former sports shooter. He competed in the 50 metre rifle, prone event at the 1968 Summer Olympics.
