= Arthur Skinner (sport shooter) =

British sports shooter

Personal information
- Born: 24 May 1919 Ampthill, England
- Died: 18 February 1993 (aged 73) Lincoln, England

Sport
- Sport: Sports shooting

Arthur Skinner (24 May 1919 – 18 February 1993) was a British sports shooter. He competed in the 50 metre rifle, prone event at the 1960 Summer Olympics.
