= Derek Robinson (sport shooter) =

British sports shooter (born 1931)

Personal information
- Born: 31 July 1931 Gravesend, Kent, England

Sport
- Sport: Sports shooting

Derek J. Robinson (born 31 July 1931) is a British former sports shooter. He competed in the 50 metre rifle, three positions event at the 1960 Summer Olympics.
