= Ivan Lazarov =

Bulgarian sports shooter

Personal information
- Born: 27 December 1929 Sofia, Bulgaria

Sport
- Sport: Sports shooting

Ivan Lazarov (Bulgarian: Иван Лазаров, born 27 December 1929) is a Bulgarian former sports shooter. He competed in the 50 metre rifle, three positions event at the 1960 Summer Olympics.
