= Werner Heyn =

German sports shooter

Personal information
- Born: 24 May 1934 (age 92) Zwickau, Germany

Sport
- Sport: Sports shooting

Werner Heyn (born 24 May 1934) is a German former sports shooter. He competed in the 50 metre rifle, prone event at the 1968 Summer Olympics for East Germany.
