= Georgios Liveris =

Greek sports shooter (1932–2026)

Personal information
- Born: 10 May 1932 Athens, Greece
- Died: 20 October 2026 (aged 94) Athens, Greece

Sport
- Sport: Sports shooting

Georgios Liveris (10 May 1932 – 20 October 2026) was a Greek sports shooter. He competed in the 50 metre rifle, three positions and 50 metre rifle, prone events at the 1960 Summer Olympics.

Liveris died in Athens on 20 October 2026, at the age of 94.
