= Vincenzo Biava =

Italian sports shooter

Personal information
- Born: 18 April 1916 Zerbolò, Italy
- Died: March 2004 (aged 87)

Sport
- Sport: Sports shooting

Vincenzo Biava (18 April 1916 – March 2004) was an Italian sport shooter who competed in the 50 metre rifle, three positions event at the 1960 Summer Olympics.
