= Jean-Luc Loret =

French sports shooter

Personal information
- Born: 2 February 1944 (age 82) Attigny, France

Sport
- Sport: Sports shooting

Jean-Luc Loret (born 2 February 1944) is a French former sports shooter. He competed in the 50 metre rifle, prone event at the 1968 Summer Olympics.
