= Dennis Filmer =

Malaysian sports shooter (1916–1981)

Personal information
- Born: 26 June 1916 Singapore
- Died: 22 March 1981 (aged 64) Kuala Lumpur, Malaysia

Sport
- Sport: Sports shooting

Dennis Walter Filmer (26 June 1916 – 22 March 1981) was a Malaysian sports shooter. He competed in the 50 metre rifle, prone event at the 1964 Summer Olympics.
