= Hans Sinniger =

Swiss sports shooter

Personal information
- Born: 9 July 1929 (age 96) Erlinsbach, Aargau, Switzerland

Sport
- Sport: Sports shooting

Hans Sinniger (born 9 July 1929) is a Swiss former sports shooter. He competed in the 50 metre rifle, prone event at the 1968 Summer Olympics.
