= Hiromu Sekine =

Japanese sports shooter

Personal information
- Born: 10 May 1943 (age 83) Tokyo, Japan

Sport
- Sport: Sports shooting

Hiromu Sekine (関根 弘, Sekine Hiromu; born 10 May 1943) is a Japanese former sports shooter. He competed in the 50 metre rifle, prone event at the 1968 Summer Olympics.
