= José Llorens =

Spanish sports shooter

Personal information
- Born: 2 February 1938 (age 88) Barcelona, Spain

Sport
- Sport: Sports shooting

José Llorens (born 2 February 1938) is a Spanish former sports shooter. He competed in the 50 metre rifle, three positions and 50 metre rifle, prone events at the 1960 Summer Olympics.
