= Habarakadage Perera =

Sri Lankan sports shooter

Personal information
- Born: 14 May 1932
- Died: 1976 (aged 43–44)

Sport
- Sport: Sports shooting

Habarakadage R. Perera (14 May 1932 – 1976) was a Sri Lankan sports shooter. He competed in the 50 metre rifle, prone event at the 1964 Summer Olympics.
