= Silvio Delgado =

Cuban sports shooter (born 1940)

Personal information
- Born: 13 December 1940 (age 85) Matanzas, Cuba

Sport
- Sport: Sports shooting

Silvio Delgado (born 13 December 1940) is a Cuban former sports shooter. He competed in the 50 metre rifle, prone event at the 1968 Summer Olympics.
