= Boris Loginow =

Venezuelan sports shooter

Personal information
- Born: 9 February 1935 Lesco, Yugoslavia
- Died: 17 October 2016 (aged 81)

Sport
- Sport: Sports shooting

Boris Loginow (9 February 1935 – 17 October 2016) was a Venezuelan sports shooter. He competed in the 50 metre rifle, prone event at the 1968 Summer Olympics.
