= Antti Koskinen (sport shooter) =

Finnish sports shooter

Personal information
- Born: 21 April 1929 Helsinki, Finland
- Died: 31 August 1988 (aged 59)

Sport
- Sport: Sports shooting

Antti Koskinen (21 April 1929 – 31 August 1988) was a Finnish sports shooter. He competed in the 50 metre rifle, prone event at the 1964 Summer Olympics.
