= Robert Hulse (sport shooter) =

Belizean sport shooter

Personal information
- Born: 10 November 1946 (age 79) Belize City, Belize

Sport
- Sport: Sports shooting

Robert Lester Hulse (born 10 November 1946) is a Belizean former sports shooter. He competed in the 50 metre rifle, prone event at the 1968 Summer Olympics.
