= Gibreel Ali =

Sudanese sport shooter (born 1924)

Personal information
- Born: 1924 Daiong, Anglo-Egyptian Sudan

Sport
- Sport: Sports shooting

Gibreel Ali (born 1924) is a Sudanese former sports shooter. He competed in the 50 metre rifle, three positions and 50 metre rifle, prone events at the 1960 Summer Olympics.
