= Pacifico Salandanan =

Filipino sports shooter

Personal information
- Born: 22 September 1929

Sport
- Sport: Sports shooting

Pacifico Salandanan (born 22 September 1929) is a Filipino former sports shooter. He competed in the 50 metre rifle, prone event at the 1964 Summer Olympics.
