= Roberto Huber =

Chilean sports shooter

Personal information
- Born: 21 February 1927 Santiago, Chile
- Died: 1 March 2008 (aged 81) Santiago, Chile

Sport
- Sport: Sports shooting

Roberto Huber (21 February 1927 – 1 March 2008) was a Chilean sports shooter. He competed in the 50 metre rifle, prone event at the 1964 Summer Olympics.
