= Rudy Schulze =

Canadian sports shooter

Personal information
- Full name: Rudolph Schulze
- Born: 31 October 1928 Berlin, Germany
- Died: 12 July 2011 (aged 82) Waterloo, Ontario, Canada

Sport
- Sport: Sports shooting

Rudy Schulze (31 October 1928 – 12 July 2011) was a Canadian sports shooter. He competed in the 50 metre rifle, prone event at the 1968 Summer Olympics.
