= José María Vallsera =

Colombian sports shooter (born 1919)

Personal information
- Full name: José María Vallsera Cadavid
- Born: 24 June 1919 Bogotá, Colombia
- Died: 19 September 2001 (aged 82)

Sport
- Sport: Sports shooting

José María Vallsera (24 June 1919 – 19 September 2001) was a Colombian sports shooter. He competed in the 50 metre rifle, three positions event at the 1960 Summer Olympics. Vallsera is deceased.
