= David du Plessis (sport shooter) =

South African sports shooter

Personal information
- Born: 12 June 1926 Rustenburg, South Africa
- Died: 26 March 1996 (aged 69) Alberton, Gauteng, South Africa

Sport
- Sport: Sports shooting

David du Plessis (12 June 1926 – 26 March 1996) was a South African sports shooter. He competed in the 50 metre rifle, prone event at the 1960 Summer Olympics.
