= Luiz Martins =

Brazilian sports shooter 1914–1998

Luiz Artigas Martins
Personal information
- Born: 29 July 1914 São Paulo, Brazil
- Died: 3 May 1998 (aged 83) São Paulo, Brazil

Sport
- Sport: Sports shooting

Luiz Artigas Martins (29 July 1914 – 3 May 1998) was a Brazilian sports shooter. He competed in the 50 metre rifle, three positions and 50 metre rifle, prone events at the 1960 Summer Olympics.
