= Dušan Houdek =

Czech sport shooter (born 1931)

Personal information
- Born: 2 April 1931 (age 95) Bratislava, Czechoslovakia

Sport
- Sport: Sport shooting

Dušan Houdek (born 2 April 1931) is a Czech former sport shooter. He competed in the 50 metre rifle, three positions and 50 metre rifle, prone events at the 1960 Summer Olympics.
