= Kyaw Aye =

Burmese sports shooter

Personal information
- Born: 28 February 1939 (age 87)

Sport
- Sport: Sports shooting

Kyaw Aye (born 28 February 1939) is a Burmese former sports shooter. He competed in the 50 metre rifle, prone event at the 1964 Summer Olympics. He also competed at the 1966 Asian Games.
