= Mohamed Sami El-Khatib =

Egyptian sports shooter

Personal information
- Born: 1 February 1936 (age 90)

Sport
- Sport: Sports shooting

Mohamed Sami El-Khatib (born 1 February 1936) is an Egyptian former sports shooter. He competed in the 50 metre rifle, prone event at the 1964 Summer Olympics.
