= Georges Wahler =

French sports shooter

Personal information
- Born: 30 August 1933 Colmar, France
- Died: 19 January 2008 (aged 74) Colmar, France

Sport
- Sport: Sports shooting

Georges Wahler (30 August 1933 – 19 January 2008) was a French sports shooter. He competed in the 50 metre rifle, three positions and 50 metre rifle, prone events at the 1960 Summer Olympics.
