= Habib Dallagi =

Tunisian sports shooter

Personal information
- Born: 15 January 1941 (age 85) Sousse, Tunisia

Sport
- Sport: Sports shooting

Habib Dallagi (born 15 January 1941) is a Tunisian former sports shooter. He competed in the 50 metre rifle, prone event at the 1960 Summer Olympics.
