= Stew Nairn =

New Zealand sport shooter

Personal information
- Full name: Stewart Gordon Nairn
- Born: 5 September 1931 Wellington, New Zealand
- Died: 6 July 1991 (aged 59)

Sport
- Sport: Sports shooting

Stewart Gordon Nairn (5 September 1931 – 6 July 1991) was a New Zealand sports shooter. He competed in the 50 metre rifle, prone event at the 1968 Summer Olympics.
