= Petrus Visagie =

Kenyan sports shooter

Personal information
- Born: 25 April 1922
- Died: 19 November 1967 (aged 45) Kingston-upon-Thames, England

Sport
- Sport: Sports shooting

Petrus Visagie (25 April 1922 – 19 November 1967) was a Kenyan sports shooter. He competed in the 50 metre rifle, prone event at the 1960 Summer Olympics.
