= Akihiro Rinzaki =

Japanese sports shooter

Personal information
- Born: 27 May 1942 (age 84)

Sport
- Sport: Sports shooting

Akihiro Rinzaki (林崎 昭裕, Rinzaki Akihiro; born 27 May 1942) is a Japanese former sports shooter. He competed in the 50 metre rifle, prone event at the 1964 Summer Olympics.
