= Peter Kohnke =

German sport shooter (1941–1975)

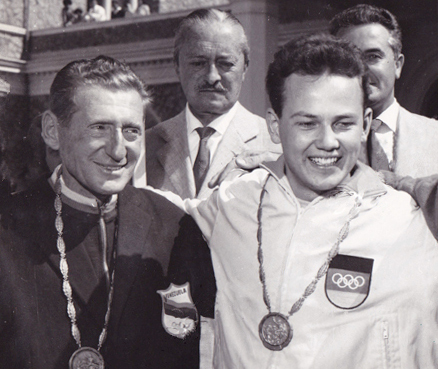
- Enrico Forcella (bronze, aged 52) and Peter Kohnke (gold, aged 18) at the 1960 Olympics

Personal information
- Nickname: Pompon
- Born: 9 October 1941 Königsberg, East Prussia, Nazi Germany
- Died: 3 April 1975 (aged 33) Bremervörde, West Germany
- Height: 1.78 m (5 ft 10 in)
- Weight: 72 kg (159 lb)

Sport
- Sport: Shooting
- Club: SG Bremervörde
Medal record
Representing Germany
Olympic Games
Gold medal – first place	1960 Rome	50 metre rifle prone

Peter Kohnke (9 October 1941 – 3 April 1975) was a German sports shooter. He won a gold medal in the 50 metre rifle prone event at the 1960 Summer Olympics in Rome. He also competed at the 1968 Summer Olympics. He died in a traffic accident, aged 33.
