= Friedrich Schattleitner =

Austrian sport shooter

Personal information
- Born: 28 September 1923 Kalwang, Austria
- Died: 4 May 2016 (aged 92)

Sport
- Sport: Sports shooting

Friedrich Schattleitner (28 September 1923 – 4 May 2016) was an Austrian sport shooter who competed at the 1968 Summer Olympics, where he finished 35th among a field of 86 competitors in the 50 m rifle - prone position event. He was born in Kalwang.
