= James Kirkwood (sport shooter) =

Australian sports shooter

Personal information
- Born: 24 November 1930
- Died: 4 November 1970 (aged 39)

Sport
- Sport: Sports shooting

James Kirkwood (24 November 1930 – 4 November 1970) was an Australian sports shooter. He competed in the 50 metre rifle, prone event at the 1964 Summer Olympics.
