= William Godwin (sport shooter) =

British sports shooter

Personal information
- Born: 8 August 1912 Birmingham, England
- Died: 3 February 2000 (aged 87) Ludlow, Shropshire, England

Sport
- Sport: Sports shooting

William Godwin (8 August 1912 – 3 February 2000) was a British sports shooter. He competed in the 50 metre rifle, prone event at the 1960 Summer Olympics.
