= Neil Vernon-Roberts =

Kenyan sports shooter

Personal information
- Born: 20 June 1933 (age 93)

Sport
- Sport: Sports shooting

Neil Vernon-Roberts (born 20 June 1933) is a Kenyan former sports shooter. He competed at the 1964 Summer Olympics in the men's 50 metre rifle prone event.
