= Yvette Courault =

French sports shooter

Personal information
- Nationality: French
- Born: 10 April 1951 (age 73)

Sport
- Sport: Sports shooting

Yvette Courault (born 10 April 1951) is a French sports shooter. She competed in two events at the 1984 Summer Olympics.
