= Farkaždin =

Farkaždin Фаркаждин
- Village (Selo)
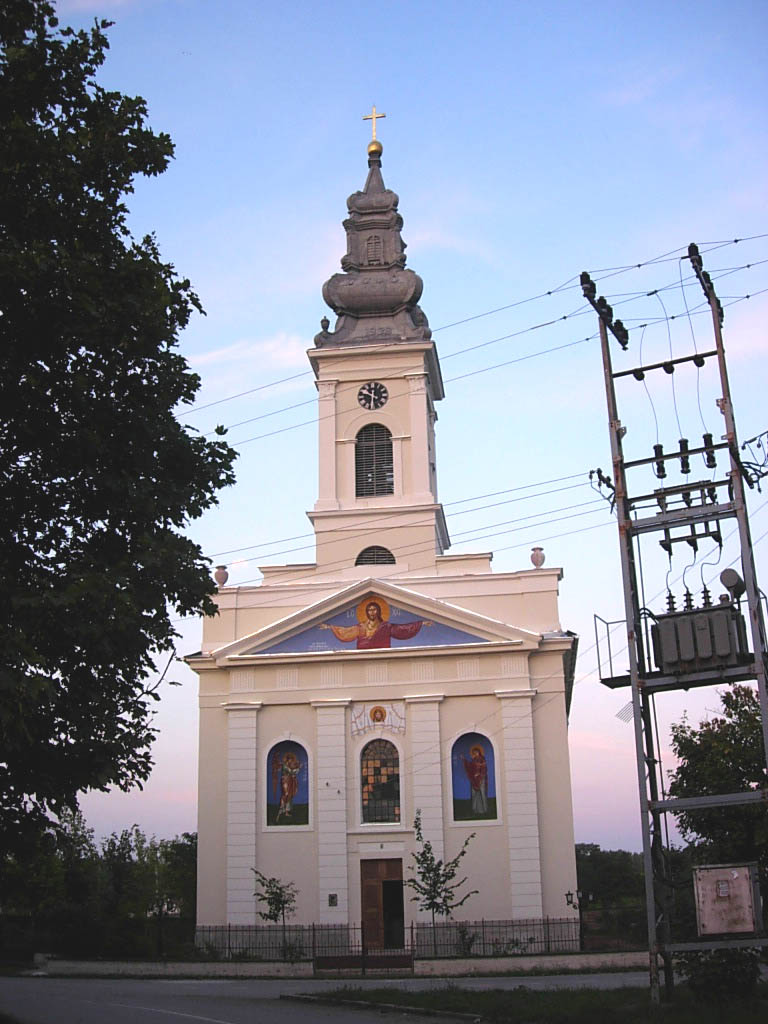
- The Orthodox Church

- Location within Serbia Farkaždin (Serbia) Farkaždin (Europe)
- Coordinates: 45°11′18″N 20°28′11″E
- Country: Serbia
- Province: Vojvodina
- District: Central Banat
- Municipalities: Zrenjanin
- Elevation: 63 m (207 ft)

Population (2002)
  - Farkaždin: 1,386
- Time zone: UTC+1 (CET)
  - Summer (DST): UTC+2 (CEST)
- Postal code: 23264
- Area code: +381(0)23
- Car plates: ZR

Farkaždin (Serbian Cyrillic: Фаркаждин; Hungarian: Farkasd) is a village in Serbia. It is located in the Zrenjanin municipality, in the Central Banat District, Vojvodina province. The village has a Serb ethnic majority (94.94%) and a population numbering 1,386 people (2002 census).

== Name ==
Names in other languages: German: Farkasdhin, Hungarian: Farkasd.

== Historical population ==
- 1961: 1,778
- 1971: 1,743
- 1981: 1,662
- 1991: 1,586

== See also ==
- List of places in Serbia
- List of cities, towns and villages in Vojvodina
- Undiscovered locations in Serbia / Neotkrivene lokacije u Srbiji
