= Nikolaos Triantafyllopoulos =

Greek sports shooter

Personal information
- Born: 10 January 1918 Messenia, Greece
- Died: 1998 (aged 79–80)

Sport
- Sport: Sports shooting

Nikolaos Triantafyllopoulos (10 January 1918 – 1998) was a Greek sports shooter. He competed in the 50 metre rifle, three positions and 50 metre rifle, prone events at the 1960 Summer Olympics.
