= James Enoch Hill =

American sport shooter (1929–2018)

James Enoch Hil
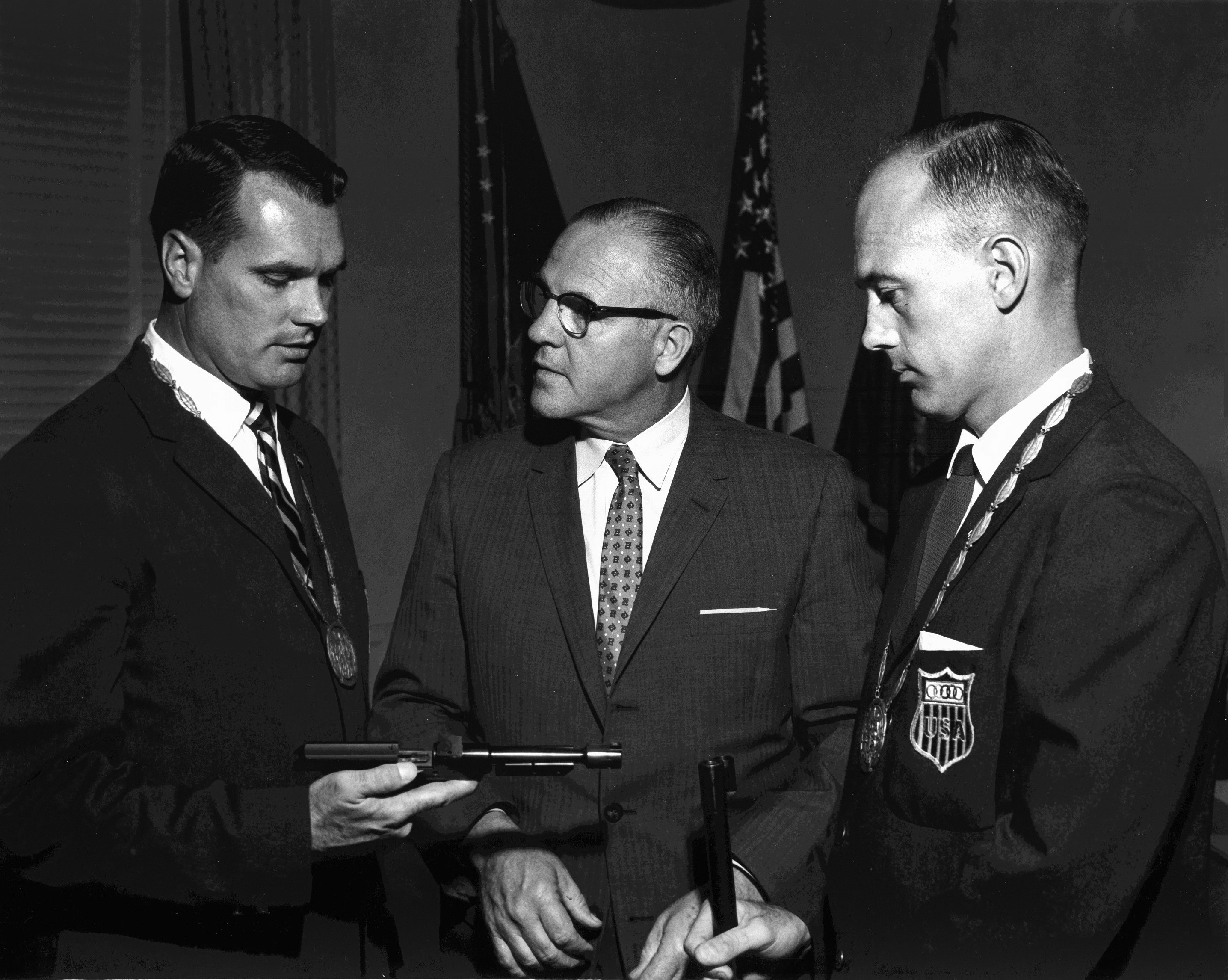
- William McMillan (left) and Hill (right) are commended by David M. Shoup, Commandant of the Marine Corps. Hill holds the rifle he used at the 1960 Olympics.

Personal information
- Born: October 30, 1929 Chicago, Illinois, U.S.
- Died: August 8, 2018 (aged 88) Carlinville, Illinois, U.S.
- Height: 1.83 m (6 ft 0 in)
- Weight: 84 kg (185 lb)

Sport
- Sport: Shooting
- Club: US Marine Corps
Medal record
Representing the United States
Olympic Games
Silver medal – second place	1960 Rome	50 metre rifle prone

James Enoch Hill (October 30, 1929 – August 8, 2018) was a sport shooter from the United States. He won a silver medal in the 50 metre rifle prone event at the 1960 Summer Olympics in Rome.

Hill was a gunnery sergeant with the United States Marine Corps serving 30 years with two tours in Vietnam as an advisor. Retired at rank of captain. In 1956 he won the National Service Rifle Championship, and in 1957 the Pershing Trophy at the NRA Championships in the free rifle team event. At one time one of the few triple distinguished shooters in the United States Hill died on August 8, 2018, in Carlinville, Illinois.
