= Manuel da Costa (sport shooter) =

Portuguese sports shooter (1926–2020)

Personal information
- Born: 10 June 1926
- Died: 20 April 2020 (aged 93)

Sport
- Sport: Sports shooting

Manuel da Costa (10 June 1926 – 20 April 2020) was a Portuguese sports shooter. He competed in the 50 metre rifle, prone event at the 1964 Summer Olympics.
