= Janez Kocmur =

Yugoslav swimmer (1937–2022)

Personal information
- Born: 2 September 1937 Maribor, Yugoslavia
- Died: April 2022 (aged 84)

Sport
- Sport: Swimming
Medal record
Representing Yugoslavia
Mediterranean Games
Silver medal – second place	1959 Beirut	100m freestyle

Janez Kocmur (2 September 1937 – April 2022) was a Yugoslav swimmer. He competed in two events at the 1960 Summer Olympics.
