= Mohamed Ben Boujemaa =

Moroccan sports shooter (born 1922)

Personal information
- Born: 1922 Rabat, French Morocco

Sport
- Sport: Sports shooting

Mohamed Ben Boujemaa (born 1922) is a Moroccan former sports shooter. He competed in the 50 metre rifle, prone event at the 1960 Summer Olympics.
