= Jacques Ben Gualid =

Moroccan fencer (1918–1976)

Personal information
- Born: 3 May 1918 Casablanca, Morocco
- Died: 3 May 1976 (aged 58) Toronto, Canada

Sport
- Sport: Fencing

Jacques Ben Gualid (3 May 1918 – 3 May 1976) was a Moroccan foil and sabre fencer. He competed in three events at the 1960 Summer Olympics. He died on 3 May 1976 on his 58th birthday.
