= José Cazorla (sport shooter) =

Venezuelan sports shooter

Personal information
- Born: 26 February 1914 Barcelona, Venezuela

Sport
- Sport: Sports shooting

José Cazorla (born 26 February 1914, date of death unknown) was a Venezuelan sports shooter. He competed in the 50 metre rifle, prone event at the 1960 Summer Olympics.
