= Milan Jeger =

Yugoslav swimmer

Personal information
- Born: 27 July 1931 Sarajevo, Yugoslavia
- Died: 29 October 2007 (aged 76) Zagreb
- Height: 190 cm (6 ft 3 in)
- Weight: 92 kg (203 lb)

Sport
- Sport: Swimming

Milan Jeger (27 July 1931 – 29 October 2007) was a Yugoslav swimmer. He competed in two events at the 1960 Summer Olympics.
