= Peter Rull Jr. =

Hong Kong sports shooter (1945–2026)

Personal information
- Full name: Peter Augustus Rull Jr.
- Nationality: Hong Kong
- Born: 23 November 1945 Hong Kong Island, Hong Kong
- Died: 8 April 2026 (aged 80) Las Vegas, Nevada, U.S.

Sport
- Sport: Sports shooting

Peter Augustus Rull Jr. (23 November 1945 – 8 April 2026) was a Hong Kong sports shooter. He competed in the men's 50 metre rifle, prone event at the 1984 Summer Olympics. Rull also competed at the ISSF World Cup in 1994 and the 1998 South East Asian Shooting Championships.

== Biography ==
Peter Augustus Rull Jr. was born on Hong Kong Island, Hong Kong on 23 November 1945. He was the son of Peter Rull Sr. and Marie Bull. His father was also a Hong Kong sports shooter, who had competed at five Olympic Games between 1960 and 1976. He attended Kowloon Junior School and King George V School, before enlisting at the Imperial Forestry Institute in Oxford, England. Rull went on to serve with the Royal Hong Kong Regiment Volunteers in 1963, and remained in active service until its abolition in 1995, retiring as a Major.

He was awarded a Member of the Most Excellent Order of the British Empire (MBE) from Queen Elizabeth II for "distinguished service and contribution to the British empire".

On 13 March 1973, Rull married Sheila Remedios in Hong Kong. The couple had two sons, Stephen and Paul. Following his retirement, he moved to San Mateo, California, then to Las Vegas, Nevada to be closer to their sons.

Rull died in Las Vegas on 8 April 2026, at the age of 80. His wife, Sheila, predeceased him in 2023.
