= Sergio Rolandi =

Italian sport shooter

Personal information
- Born: 9 August 1927 Vigevano, Italy
- Died: 24 January 1995 (aged 67)

Sport
- Sport: Sports shooting

Sergio Rolandi (9 August 1927 – 24 January 1995) was an Italian sport shooter who competed in 50 metre rifle, three positions event at the 1960 Summer Olympics.
