= Stefan Lövbom =

Swedish sports shooter

Personal information
- Nationality: Swedish
- Born: 26 July 1963 (age 61); Gävle, Sweden

Sport
- Sport: Sports shooting

Stefan Lövbom (born 26 July 1963) is a Swedish sports shooter. He competed in two events at the 1988 Summer Olympics.
