= Dominique Esnault =

French sport shooter (born 1959)

Personal information
- Nationality: French
- Born: 18 January 1959 (age 66); Versailles, France

Sport
- Sport: Sports shooting

Dominique Esnault (born 18 January 1959) is a French sport shooter. She competed in rifle shooting events at the 1984 Summer Olympics, the 1988 Summer Olympics and the 1992 Summer Olympics.

== Olympic results ==
| Event | 1984 | 1988 | 1992 |
|---|---|---|---|
| 50 metre rifle three positions (women) | 16th | T-23rd | T-30th |
