= Viktor Shamburkin =

Soviet sport shooter (1931–2018)

Personal information
- Born: 12 October 1931 Leningrad, Soviet Union
- Died: 11 May 2018 (aged 86) Moscow, Russia

Sport
- Sport: Sports shooting
Medal record
Men's shooting
Representing Soviet Union
Olympic Games
Gold medal – first place	1960 Rome	50m rifle, three positions

Viktor Nikolayevich Shamburkin (Виктор Николаевич Шамбуркин; 12 October 1931 – 11 May 2018) was a Soviet sport shooter and Olympic champion.

He won a gold medal in 50 m rifle 3 positions event at the 1960 Summer Olympics in Rome.
