= José del Villar =

Spanish sports shooter

Personal information
- Born: 28 June 1943 (age 83) Castellón, Spain

Sport
- Sport: Sports shooting

José del Villar (born 28 June 1943) is a Spanish former sports shooter. He competed at the 1968 Summer Olympics and the 1976 Summer Olympics.
