= Abderrahman Sebti =

Moroccan fencer (born 1916)

Personal information
- Born: 9 January 1916 Fez, Morocco

Sport
- Sport: Fencing

Abderrahman Sebti (Arabic: عبد الرحمن سبتي; born 9 January 1916, date of death unknown) was a Moroccan épée, foil and sabre fencer. He competed in five events at the 1960 Summer Olympics.
