= Josip Ćuk =

Yugoslav sports shooter (1936–2019)

Personal information
- Born: 19 March 1936 Donja Stubica, Kingdom of Yugoslavia
- Died: 25 April 2019 (aged 83) Zagreb, Croatia

Sport
- Sport: Sports shooting

Josip Ćuk (19 March 1936 – 25 April 2019) was a Yugoslav sports shooter. He competed in the 300 metre rifle, three positions and 50 metre rifle, prone events at the 1960 Summer Olympics.
