= Sándor Bereczky =

Hungarian sports shooter

Personal information
- Nationality: Hungarian
- Born: 10 March 1965 (age 60); Debrecen, Hungary

Sport
- Sport: Sports shooting

Sándor Bereczky (born 10 March 1965) is a Hungarian sports shooter. He competed in two events at the 1988 Summer Olympics.
