= Pedro Medina (sport shooter) =

Spanish sports shooter

Personal information
- Born: 25 June 1941 (age 85) Lopera, Spain

Sport
- Sport: Sports shooting

Pedro Medina (born 25 June 1941) is a Spanish former sports shooter. He competed in the 50 metre rifle, prone event at the 1964 Summer Olympics.
