= Abderraouf El-Fassy =

Moroccan fencer

Personal information
- Born: 11 April 1940 (age 86) Salé, Morocco
- Died: 24 January 2020

Sport
- Sport: Fencing

Abderraouf El-Fassy (Arabic: عبد الرؤوف الفاسي; 11 April 1940 – 24 January 2020) was a Moroccan fencer. He competed in the individual and team foil and épée events at the 1960 Summer Olympics.
