= Chan Kooi Chye =

Malaysian sports shooter

Personal information
- Born: 20 June 1921 Kuala Lumpur, Malaysia

Sport
- Sport: Sports shooting

Chan Kooi Chye (born 20 June 1921) is a Malaysian former sports shooter. He competed in the 50 metre rifle, prone event at the 1960 Summer Olympics.
