= Javier Caceres (sport shooter) =

Peruvian sports shooter

Personal information
- Full name: Javier Jorge Cáceres López
- Born: 19 April 1925 Huaraz, Peru
- Died: 26 December 2021 (aged 96) Peru

Sport
- Sport: Sports shooting

Javier Caceres (19 April 1925 – 26 December 2021) was a Peruvian sports shooter. He competed in the 50 metre rifle, prone event at the 1964 Summer Olympics.
