= El-Moustafa Haddad =

Moroccan sailor

Personal information
- Nationality: Moroccan
- Born: 1940 (age 84–85); El Jadida, Morocco

Sport
- Sport: Sailing

El-Moustafa Haddad (born 1940) is a Moroccan sailor. He competed in the Finn event at the 1960 Summer Olympics.
