= Margareta Gustafsson =

Swedish sports shooter

Personal information
- Nationality: Swedish
- Born: 14 April 1951 (age 73); Eskilstuna, Sweden

Sport
- Sport: Sports shooting

Margareta Gustafsson (born 14 April 1951) is a Swedish sports shooter. She competed in two events at the 1984 Summer Olympics.
