= Christoph Kaulich =

German sport shooter (born 1994)

Personal information
- Nationality: German
- Born: 11 October 1994 (age 31)

Sport
- Country: Germany
- Sport: Shooting
- Event: Rifle
- Club: HSG Regensburg
Medal record
World Championships
Gold medal – first place	2018 Changwon	50 m team rifle prone

Christoph Kaulich (born 11 October 1994) is a German sport shooter.

He participated at the 2018 ISSF World Shooting Championships, winning a medal.
