= Christina Gustafsson =

Swedish sports shooter

Personal information
- Nationality: Swedish
- Born: 14 April 1951; Eskilstuna, Sweden
- Died: 13 January 2016 (aged 64)

Sport
- Sport: Sports shooting

Christina Gustafsson (14 April 1951 – 13 January 2016) was a Swedish sports shooter. She competed in two events at the 1984 Summer Olympics.
