= Bouchaib Zeroual =

Moroccan sports shooter (born 1917)

Personal information
- Born: 1917 Rabat, Morocco

Sport
- Sport: Sports shooting

Bouchaib Zeroual (born 1917, date of death unknown) was a Moroccan sports shooter. He competed in the 50 metre rifle, three positions and 50 metre rifle, prone events at the 1960 Summer Olympics. Zeroual is deceased.
