= Abdesselem Lahmidi =

Moroccan sports shooter

Personal information
- Born: 1926 Rabat, French Morocco

Sport
- Sport: Sports shooting

Abdesselem Lahmidi (born 1926) is a Moroccan former sports shooter. He competed in the 50 metre rifle, three positions event at the 1960 Summer Olympics.
