= Walter Frescura =

Italian sports shooter

Personal information
- Born: 12 May 1940 (age 86) Calalzo di Cadore, Italy

Sport
- Sport: Sports shooting

Walter Frescura (born 12 May 1940) is an Italian former sport shooter who competed in the 1972 Summer Olympics, in the 1976 Summer Olympics, and in the 1980 Summer Olympics.
