= Choomphol Chaiyanitr =

Thai sport shooter

Personal information
- Born: 22 March 1922 Lampang, Thailand

Sport
- Sport: Sports shooting

Choomphol Chaiyanitr (born 22 March 1922) is a Thai former sports shooter. He competed at the 1964 Summer Olympics and the 1968 Summer Olympics.
