= Cirilo Nassiff =

Argentine sports shooter (1905–1990)

Personal information
- Born: 4 November 1905 Buenos Aires, Argentina
- Died: 1990 (aged 84–85)

Sport
- Sport: Sports shooting

Cirilo Nassiff (4 November 1905 – 1990) was an Argentine sports shooter. He competed at the 1960 Summer Olympics and the 1964 Summer Olympics.
