= Sylvia Muehlberg =

Australian sports shooter

Personal information
- Nationality: Australian
- Born: 31 July 1947 (age 78)

Sport
- Sport: Sports shooting

Sylvia Muehlberg (born 31 July 1947) is an Australian sports shooter. She competed in two events at the 1984 Summer Olympics.
