= Johannes Human =

South African sports shooter (1930–1997)

Personal information
- Born: 6 September 1930 Bloemfontein, South Africa
- Died: 20 January 1997 (aged 66) Bloemfontein, South Africa

Sport
- Sport: Sports shooting

Johannes Human (6 September 1930 – 20 January 1997) was a South African sports shooter. He competed at the 1956 Summer Olympics and the 1960 Summer Olympics.
