= Klaus Zähringer =

German sport shooter

Personal information
- Born: 17 October 1939 Königsberg, Germany
- Died: 9 June 2024 (aged 84)

Sport
- Sport: Sports shooting
Medal record
Men's shooting
Representing Germany
Olympic Games
Bronze medal – third place	1960 Rome	50m rifle, three positions

Klaus Zähringer (17 October 1939 – 9 June 2024) was a German sport shooter. He was born in Königsberg. He won a bronze medal in 50 metre rifle three positions event at the 1960 Summer Olympics in Rome.
