= Enrico Forcella =

Venezuelan sport shooter (1907–1989)

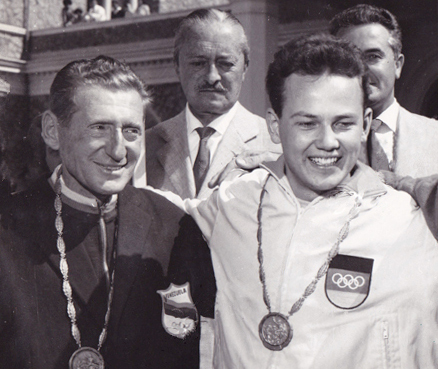
- Enrico Forcella (left) and Peter Kohnke at the 1960 Olympics

Personal information
- Nickname: Pompon
- Born: October 18, 1907 Monaco
- Died: October 25, 1989 (aged 82)
- Height: 1.71 m (5 ft 7 in)
- Weight: 60 kg (132 lb)

Sport
- Sport: Shooting
Medal record
Representing Venezuela
Olympic Games
Bronze medal – third place	1960 Rome	Small-bore rifle, prone
Pan American Games
Gold medal – first place	1963 São Paulo	Small-bore rifle, prone

Enrico Forcella Pelliccioni (October 18, 1907 – October 25, 1989) was a Venezuelan shooter. He competed at the 1960, 1964 and 1968 Olympics in the small-bore rifle, prone position, 50 m and finished in 3rd, 15th and 44th place, respectively.
