= Josef Fröwis =

Austrian sport shooter

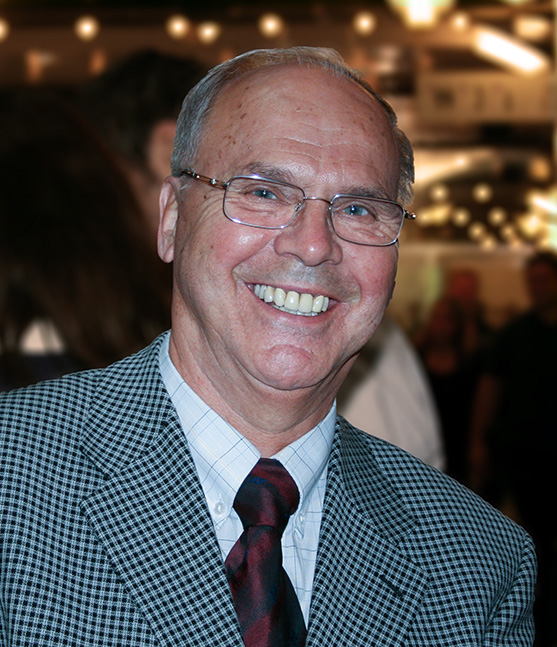

Personal information
- Born: 17 March 1937 Feldkirch, Austria
- Died: 3 May 2022 (aged 85) Frastanz, Austria

Sport
- Country: Austria
- Sport: Sports shooting

Josef Fröwis (17 March 1937 – 3 May 2022) was an Austrian sport shooter who competed in the 1960 Summer Olympics.
