= Mohamed Ben Joullon =

Moroccan fencer

Personal information
- Born: 23 September 1925 Casablanca, Morocco

Sport
- Sport: Fencing

Mohamed Ben Joullon (Arabic: محمد بن جولون; born 23 September 1925) is a Moroccan épée, foil and sabre fencer. He competed in five events at the 1960 Summer Olympics.
