= Yukio Inokuma =

Japanese sports shooter (born 1920)

Personal information
- Born: 猪熊幸夫 (Inokuma Yukio); 2 January 1920

Sport
- Sport: Sports shooting

Yukio Inokuma (born 2 January 1920, date of death unknown) was a Japanese sports shooter. He competed at the 1952 Summer Olympics, 1956 Summer Olympics and 1960 Summer Olympics. Inokuma is deceased.
