= Peter Rull Sr. =

Hong Kong sports shooter

- Born: 17 November 1922; Estonia
- Died: 5 January 2014 (aged 91)
- Sports career
- Sport: Sports shooting
- Military career
- Allegiance: British Empire
- Branch: Royal Hong Kong Regiment

Peter Augustus Rull Sr. (17 November 1922 – 5 January 2014) was a sport shooter who represented Hong Kong at five editions of the Summer Olympic Games. He competed in the 50 metre rifle prone event each time, finishing 36th in 1960, 70th in 1964, 71st in 1968, 83rd in 1972, and joint-41st (with five other participants) in 1976. He also took part in the 50 metre rifle three positions tournament in 1964, where he placed 49th. He was born in Estonia. He also took part in six editions of the Commonwealth Games, the last of which was in 1994, after which he retired from international competition. By career he was a shooting coach for the police and a land bailiff. His son, Peter Rull Jr., competed for Hong Kong as a sport shooter at the 1984 Summer Olympics.
