= Gholam Hossein Mobaser =

Iranian sports shooter

Personal information
- Born: 9 March 1929 Zarand, Iran

Sport
- Sport: Sports shooting

Gholam Hossein Mobaser (born 9 March 1929) is an Iranian former sports shooter. He competed at the 1960 Summer Olympics and the 1964 Summer Olympics.
