= Miroslav Stojanović =

Serbian sport shooter

Personal information
- Born: 21 November 1939 (age 86) Niš, Kingdom of Yugoslavia

Sport
- Sport: Sports shooting
Medal record
Men's shooting
Representing Yugoslavia
European Championships
Silver medal – second place	1963 Oslo	STR3X30

Miroslav Stojanović (Serbian Cyrillic: Мирослав Стојановић; born 21 November 1939), is a Serbian sport shooter who competed for Yugoslavia at the 1960 Olympic Games.
