= Martsel Koen =

Bulgarian sports shooter

Personal information
- Full name: Martsel Yossif Koen
- Born: 5 July 1933 (age 92) Plovdiv, Bulgaria

Sport
- Sport: Sports shooting

Martsel Koen (Bulgarian: Марцел Коен; born 5 July 1933) is a Bulgarian former sports shooter. He competed at the 1960, 1964 and the 1968 Summer Olympics.
