= Hannan Crystal =

Israeli sports shooter

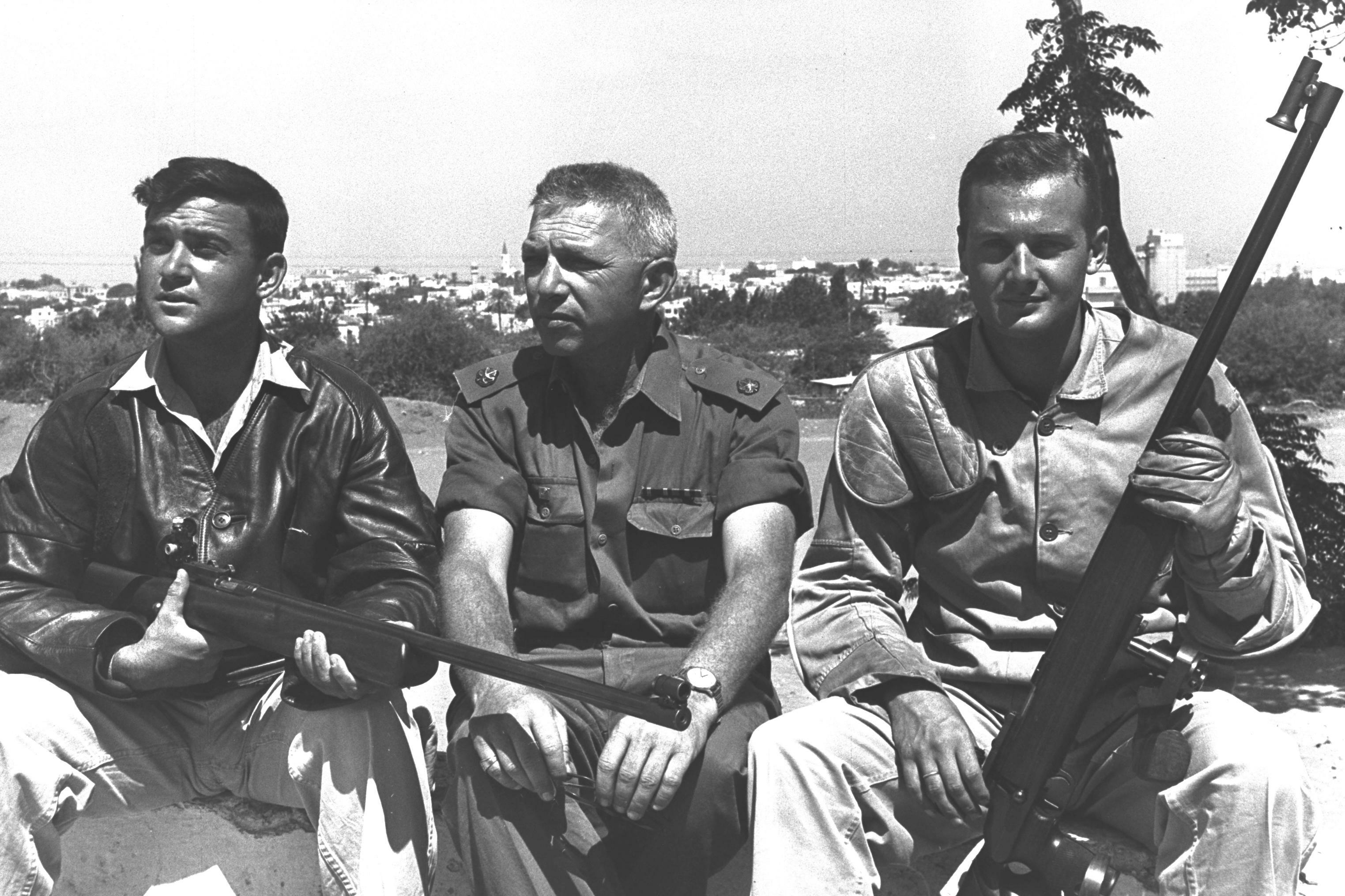
- L-R, Hannan Crystal, trainer Izzy Gilam, and Rafael Peles

Personal information
- Native name: חנן קריסטל
- Nationality: Israeli
- Born: 15 January 1938 (age 88) Tel Aviv, Israel

Sport
- Country: Israel
- Sport: Sports shooting

Hannan Crystal (Hebrew: חנן קריסטל; born 15 January 1938) is an Israeli former sports shooter. He competed at the 1960 Summer Olympics and the 1964 Summer Olympics.
