= Norman Rule =

Australian sports shooter

Personal information
- Born: 28 January 1928 (age 98) Adelaide, Australia

Sport
- Sport: Sports shooting

Norman Rule (born 28 January 1928) is an Australian former sports shooter. He competed at the 1956, 1960 and the 1964 Summer Olympics.
