= Jerzy Nowicki =

Polish sport shooter

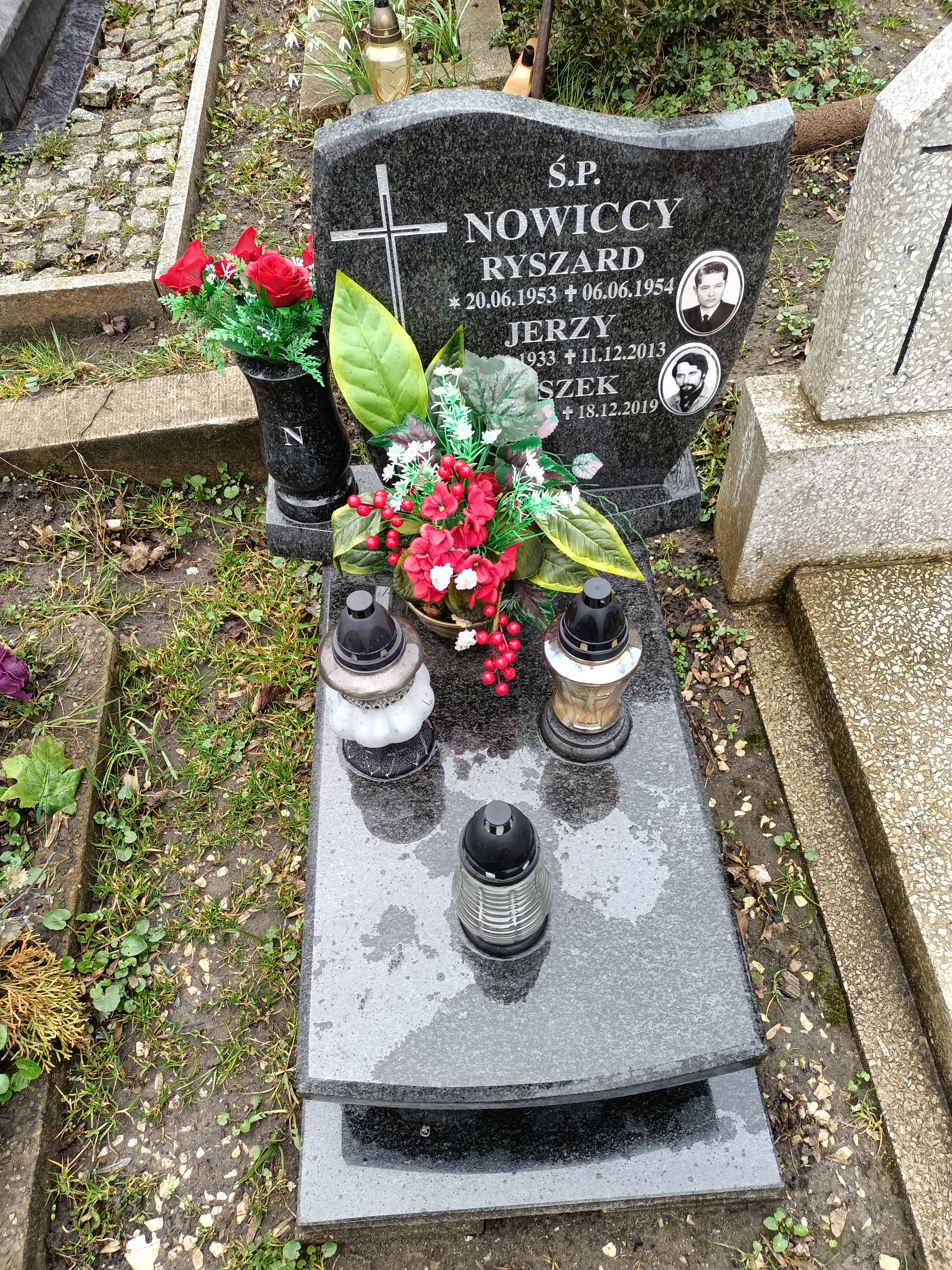
- Grave of Jerzy Nowicki

Personal information
- Born: 2 January 1933 Brześć, Poland
- Died: December 2013 (aged 80)

Sport
- Sport: Sports shooting

Jerzy Nowicki (2 January 1933 – December 2013) was a Polish sport shooter who competed in the 1960 Summer Olympics, in the 1964 Summer Olympics, and in the 1968 Summer Olympics.
