= Shooting at the 1952 Summer Olympics – Men's 50 metre rifle prone =

Men's 50 metre rifle, prone at the Games of the XV Olympiad
- Venue: Helsinki, Finland
- Date: 29 July 1952
- Competitors: 58 from 32 nations

Medalists
1st place, gold medalist(s)		Iosif Sîrbu	Romania
2nd place, silver medalist(s)		Boris Andreyev	Soviet Union
3rd place, bronze medalist(s)		Art Jackson	United States

The men's 50 metre rifle, prone was a shooting sports event held as part of the Shooting at the 1952 Summer Olympics programme. It was the seventh appearance of the event. The competition was held on 29 July 1952 at the shooting ranges in Helsinki. 58 shooters from 32 nations competed.

== Medalists ==
Gold	Silver	Bronze
Iosif Sîrbu; Romania	Boris Andreyev; Soviet Union	Art Jackson; United States

== Results ==
Place	Shooter	Total
1	Iosif Sîrbu (ROU)	400
2	Boris Andreyev (URS)	400
3	Art Jackson (USA)	399
4	Gil Boa (CAN)	399
5	Erich Spörer (GER)	399
6	Otto Horber (SUI)	398
7	Kullervo Leskinen (FIN)	398
8	Severino Moreira (BRA)	398
9	Walther Fröstell (SWE)	397
10	Ernst Huber (SUI)	397
11	Vilho Ylönen (FIN)	397
12	Charles Hyde (GBR)	397
13	Martin Gison (PHI)	397
14	Erling Kongshaug (NOR)	397
15	Cesar Jayme (PHI)	397
16	Uno Berg (SWE)	396
17	Yukio Inokuma (JPN)	396
18	Siegfried Gurschler (AUT)	396
19	Steffen Cranmer (GBR)	396
20	Petre Cișmigiu (ROU)	396
21	Emmett Swanson (USA)	396
22	Jacques Mazoyer (FRA)	396
23	Wilhelm Sachsenmaier (AUT)	396
24	Pyotr Avilov (URS)	395
25	Juan Bizama (CHI)	395
26	Edson Warner (CAN)	394
27	Imre Ágoston (HUN)	394
28	Uffe Schultz Larsen (DEN)	394
29	Harihar Banerjee (IND)	394
30	José Gómez (GUA)	394
31	Albert Sigl (GER)	394
32	Mauritz Amundsen (NOR)	394
33	Paul Konsler (FRA)	393
34	William Murless (RSA)	393
35	Humberto Briceño (VEN)	393
36	Antoine Shousha (EGY)	393
37	Luís Howorth (POR)	393
38	Jørgen Hare (DEN)	392
39	Souren Choudhury (IND)	391
40	Ludwig Gräf (SAA)	391
41	Zvi Pinkas (ISR)	388
42	Frans Lafortune (BEL)	388
43	Nemanja Marković (YUG)	387
44	Jacques Lafortune (BEL)	387
45	Alfredo Mury (GUA)	387
46	Pierre Marsan (MON)	387
47	Zlatko Mašek (YUG)	386
48	Harvey Dias Villela (BRA)	385
49	Athanasios Aravositas (GRE)	384
50	Abdullah Jaroudi Sr. (LIB)	384
51	Roger Abel (MON)	384
52	Hans Eschenbrenner (SAA)	384
53	Ahmed Hamdi (EGY)	383
54	János Dosztály (HUN)	382
55	Joaquim Sampaio (POR)	381
56	Alexander Eliraz (ISR)	381
57	Rafael Arnal (VEN)	380
58	Jan Azam (PAK)	366
