= Shooting at the 1952 Summer Olympics – Men's 50 metre rifle three positions =

Sports shooting at the Olympics

Men's 50 metre rifle three positions at the Games of the XV Olympiad
- Venue: Helsinki, Finland
- Date: 29 July 1952
- Competitors: 44 from 25 nations

Medalists
1st place, gold medalist(s)		Erling Kongshaug	Norway
2nd place, silver medalist(s)		Vilho Ylönen	Finland
3rd place, bronze medalist(s)		Boris Andreyev	Soviet Union

The Men's 50 metre rifle three positions event was a shooting sports event held as part of the Shooting at the 1952 Summer Olympics programme. It was the first appearance of the event. The competition was held on 29 July 1952 at the shooting ranges in Helsinki. 44 shooters from 25 nations competed.

== Medalists ==
Gold	Silver	Bronze
Erling Kongshaug; Norway	Vilho Ylönen; Finland	Boris Andreyev; Soviet Union

== Results ==
Place	Shooter	Total
1	Erling Kongshaug (NOR)	1164
2	Vilho Ylönen (FIN)	1164
3	Boris Andreyev (URS)	1163
4	Ernst Huber (SUI)	1162
5	Pyotr Avilov (URS)	1162
6	Iosif Sîrbu (ROU)	1161
7	Uno Berg (SWE)	1158
8	Kullervo Leskinen (FIN)	1157
9	Jacques Mazoyer (FRA)	1157
10	Otto Horber (SUI)	1156
11	Mauritz Amundsen (NOR)	1156
12	Art Jackson (USA)	1155
13	Emmett Swanson (USA)	1155
14	Walther Fröstell (SWE)	1154
15	Uffe Schultz Larsen (DEN)	1152
16	Imre Ágoston (HUN)	1150
17	Siegfried Gurschler (AUT)	1145
18	Erich Spörer (GER)	1143
19	Wilhelm Sachsenmaier (AUT)	1140
20	Albert Sigl (GER)	1134
21	Gil Boa (CAN)	1133
22	Steffen Cranmer (GBR)	1132
23	Frans Lafortune (BEL)	1131
24	Jacques Lafortune (BEL)	1131
25	Zlatko Mašek (YUG)	1129
26	Nemanja Marković (YUG)	1127
27	Severino Moreira (BRA)	1122
28	Juan Bizama (CHI)	1120
29	János Dosztály (HUN)	1117
30	Paul Konsler (FRA)	1114
31	Luís Howorth (POR)	1114
32	Harvey Dias Villela (BRA)	1113
33	Humberto Briceño (VEN)	1104
34	Charles Hyde (GBR)	1100
35	Edson Warner (CAN)	1096
36	Harihar Banerjee (IND)	1095
37	Joaquim Sampaio (POR)	1095
38	Ludwig Gräf (SAA)	1089
39	Rafael Arnal (VEN)	1083
40	Ahmed Hamdi (EGY)	1079
41	Zvi Pinkas (ISR)	1077
42	Roger Abel (MON)	1061
43	Antoine Shousha (EGY)	1060
44	Alexander Eliraz (ISR)	1059
