= Shooting at the 1952 Summer Olympics – Men's 300 metre free rifle, three positions =

Olympic shooting event

Men's 300 metre free rifle, three positions at the Games of the XV Olympiad
- Shooting pictogram
- Venue: Helsinki, Finland
- Date: 27 July 1952
- Competitors: 32 from 18 nations
- Winning score: 1123 OR

Medalists
1st place, gold medalist(s)		Anatoli Bogdanov; Soviet Union
2nd place, silver medalist(s)		Robert Bürchler; Switzerland
3rd place, bronze medalist(s)		Lev Vainshtein; Soviet Union

The men's 300 m rifle three positions was a shooting sports event held as part of the Shooting at the 1952 Summer Olympics programme. It was the sixth appearance of the event at an Olympic Games. The competition was held on 27 July 1952, with 32 shooters from 18 nations competing. Each nation was limited to two shooters. The event was won by Anatoli Bogdanov with Lev Vainshtein in third, as the Soviet Union took both gold and bronze in its debut. Between the Soviets was Robert Bürchler of Switzerland, earning silver.

== Background ==
This was the sixth appearance of the men's 300 metre three-positions rifle event, which was held 11 times between 1900 and 1972. Three of the top 10 shooters from 1948 returned: silver medalist Pauli Janhonen of Finland, eighth-place finisher Holger Erbén of Sweden, and tenth-place finisher Emmett Swanson of the United States. August Hollenstein of Switzerland was the 1952 world champion, with his countryman Robert Bürchler finishing third.

Brazil, Canada, Egypt, Guatemala, India, Israel, the Soviet Union, Venezuela, and Yugoslavia each made their debut in the event. Denmark and Norway each made their sixth appearance, the only nations to have competed at every appearance of the event to date; France missed the event for the first time.

== Competition format ==
The competition had each shooter fire 120 shots, 40 shots in each of three positions: prone, kneeling, and standing. Shots were fired in series of 10. The target was 1 metre in diameter, with 10 scoring rings; targets were set at a distance of 300 metres. Thus, the maximum score possible was 1200 points. Any rifle could be used.

== Records ==
Prior to the competition, the existing world and Olympic records were as follows.

World record	Elmar Kivistik (EST)	1124	Helsinki, Finland	1937
Olympic record	Emil Grünig (SUI)	1120	London, United Kingdom	5–6 August 1948

Anatoli Bogdanov broke the Olympic record with 1123 points to win. The second-place finisher, Robert Bürchler, equalled the old record. Bürchler set a world record in the kneeling position, with 381 points.

== Schedule ==
All times are Eastern European Summer Time (UTC+3)

Date	Time	Round
Sunday, 27 July 1952	9:00	Final

== Results ==
Rank	Shooter	Nation	Score				Notes
Rank	Shooter	Nation	Standing	Kneeling	Prone	Total	Notes
1st place, gold medalist(s)	Anatoli Bogdanov	Soviet Union	359	376	388	1123	OR
2nd place, silver medalist(s)	Robert Bürchler	Switzerland	350	381 WR	389	1120	
3rd place, bronze medalist(s)	Lev Vainshtein	Soviet Union	355	376	378	1109	
4	August Hollenstein	Switzerland	354	370	384	1108	
5	Vilho Ylönen	Finland	351	377	379	1107	
6	Robert Sandager	United States	349	371	384	1104	
7	Holger Erbén	Sweden	347	376	379	1102	
8	Walther Fröstell	Sweden	335	375	389	1099	
9	Pablo Cagnasso	Argentina	342	369	381	1092	
10	Ambrus Balogh	Hungary	349	359	374	1082	
11	Erling Kongshaug	Norway	342	358	377	1077	
12	Pauli Janhonen	Finland	348	351	378	1077	
13	David Schiaffino	Argentina	340	359	375	1074	
14	Jovan Kratohvil	Yugoslavia	346	352	375	1073	
15	Uffe Schultz Larsen	Denmark	324	359	384	1067	
16	Stjepan Prauhardt	Yugoslavia	326	362	377	1065	
17	Mauritz Amundsen	Norway	330	355	372	1057	
18	Emmett Swanson	United States	317	371	367	1055	
19	Gil Boa	Canada	322	359	372	1053	
20	Ferenc Décsey	Hungary	336	347	353	1036	
21	Dov Ben-Dov	Israel	314	349	370	1033	
22	Rigoberto Rivero	Venezuela	330	333	365	1028	
23	Ahmed Hamdi	Egypt	303	332	373	1008	
24	Harihar Banerjee	India	299	336	359	994	
25	Humberto Briceño	Venezuela	270	343	371	984	
26	Shmuel Laviv-Lubin	Israel	291	315	367	973	
27	Alberto Braga	Brazil	288	323	351	962	
28	John Pearson	Great Britain	279	318	358	955	
29	Jocelyn Barlow	Great Britain	266	316	362	944	
30	Saad El-Din El-Shorbagui	Egypt	251	321	369	941	
31	Antônio Guimarães	Brazil	281	309	342	932	
32	Alfredo Mury	Guatemala	245	277	363	885	
