= Dov =

Dov (דב or דוב) is a Hebrew male given name meaning "bear", akin to the Yiddish name "Ber" (בער). Notable people with the name include:

- Dov Ber Abramowitz (1860–1926), American Orthodox rabbi and author
- Dov Albukrek (born 1966), Israeli physician
- Dov Alfon (born 1961), Israeli journalist and author
- Dov Alpert (1930–1963), Israeli writer
- Dov Atzmon (1941–2020), Israeli footballer
- Dov ben Samuel Baer, author of Shivhe ha-Besht
- Dov Bar-Nir (1911–2000), Israeli politician
- Dov Ben-Dov (1927–2020), Israeli sports shooter
- Dov Ben-Meir (1927–2020), Israeli politician
- Dov Ber Birkenthal (1723–1805), 18th century Hebrew memoirist
- Dov Cariño (born 2003), Filipino footballer
- Dov Carmel (born 1932), Israeli composer and music arranger
- Dov Charney (born 1969), Canadian entrepreneur
- Dov Davidoff (born 1973), American comedian
- Dov Dori (born 1953), Israeli-American computer scientist
- Dov Eichenwald (born 1955), Israeli publisher
- Dov Berish Einhorn (1877–1942), Polish rabbi
- Dov Elbaum (born 1970), Israeli writer, journalist, and philosopher
- Dov J. Elkabas (born 1968), Dutch DJ, musician and producer
- Dov Feigin (1907–2000), Israeli sculptor
- Dov Forman (born 2003), British author and social media creator
- Dov Freiberg (1927–2008), Polish Holocaust survivor, writer
- Dov Frohman (born 1939), Israeli electrical engineer and business executive
- Dov Gabbay (born 1945), Israeli logician
- Dov Gazit (1908–1986), Israeli Air Force commander
- Dov Glickman (born 1949), Israeli actor
- Dov Gottesman (1929–2011), Israeli art collector
- Dov Groverman (born 1965), Israeli wrestler
- Dov Grumet-Morris (born 1982), American ice hockey player
- Dov Gruner (1912–1947), Zionist activist
- Dov Tzvi Heller (1862–1935), Lithuanian Haredi rabbi
- Dov Hikind (born 1950), American politician and activist
- Dov Hoenig (born 1932), American film editor and novelist
- Dov Hoz (1894–1940), Israeli aviation pioneer
- Dov Jaron (1935–2024), American engineer
- Dov Kalmanovich (born 1956), Israeli municipal politician and social activist
- Dov Karmi (1905–1962), Israeli architect
- Dov Khenin (born 1958), Israeli politician
- Dov Kleiman, American sports media personality
- Dov Koppelman (1909–2011), Swiss rabbi
- Otto Dov Kulka (1933–2021), Israeli historian, writer, and university teacher
- Dov Lando (born 1930), Israeli rabbi
- Dov Levin (1925–2001), Israeli Supreme Court justice
- Dov Levine (born 1958), American physicist
- Dov Linzer (born 1966), New York rabbi
- Dov Lior (born 1933), Israeli Orthodox rabbi
- Dov Lipman (born 1971), Israeli politician
- Dov Lupi (born 1948), Israeli artistic gymnast
- Dov Behr Manischewitz (1858–1914), Lithuanian-American rabbi and businessman
- Dov Markus (born 1946), Israeli-American soccer player
- Dov Ber of Mezeritch (1704–1772), Hasidic rabbi
- Dov Milman (1919–2007), Israeli diplomat
- Dov Moran (born 1955), Israeli entrepreneur, inventor and investor
- Dov Navon (born 1959), Israeli comedian and actor
- Dov Nisman (born 1954), Israeli swimmer
- Dov Noy (1920–2013), Israeli folklorist
- Dov Raviv (born 1937), Israeli engineer
- Dov Reiser (born 1947), Israeli actor
- Dov Rosenblatt (born 1981), American singer-songwriter
- Dov Sadan (1902–1989), Israeli literary critic and politician
- Dov Schperling (1937–2014), Zionist pioneer
- Dov Schwartz (born 1961), Israeli professor of Jewish thought
- Dov Schwartzman (1921–2011), Russian-born American Haredi rabbi
- Dov Segev-Steinberg (born 1956), Israeli diplomat
- Dov Seidman (born 1964), American author, columnist and businessman
- Dov Seltzer (born 1932), Romanian-born Israeli composer and conductor
- Dov Shilansky (1924–2010), Israeli politician
- Dov Shmotkin (born 1949), Israeli psychologist
- Dov Shurin (born 1949), Israeli singer-songwriter
- Dov Sternberg, American karateka
- Dov Tamari (mathematician) (1911–2006), German mathematician
- Dov Tamari (brigadier general) (born 1936), Israeli military leader
- Dov Tiefenbach (born 1981), Canadian actor and musician
- Dov Waxman (born 1974), American political scientist
- Dov Berish Weidenfeld (1881–1965), Chief Rabbi of Tshebin
- Dov Weissglas (born 1946), Israeli lawyer and businessman
- Dov Yaffe (1928–2017), Lithuanian-born Israeli rabbi
- Dov Yermiya (1914–2016), Israeli writer
- Dov Yosef (1899–1980), Israeli statesman
- Dov S. Zakheim (born 1948), United States Department of Defense official
- Dov Zakin (1922–1986), Israeli politician
- Dov Zur (born 1955), Israeli politician

== Surname ==
- Aleksandr Dov (born 1954), Soviet-Israeli singer

== Fictional characters ==
- Dov Epstein, in the Canadian TV show Rookie Blue

== See also ==
- Ben-Dov
- Dov-Ber
