= Guatemala at the 1952 Summer Olympics =

- IOC code: GUA
- NOC: Guatemalan Olympic Committee

in Helsinki
- Competitors: 21 in 6 sports
- Flag bearer: Doroteo Flores
- Medals: Gold 0 Silver 0 Bronze 0 Total 0

Summer Olympics appearances (overview)
- 1952; 1956–1964; 1968; 1972; 1976; 1980; 1984; 1988; 1992; 1996; 2000; 2004; 2008; 2012; 2016; 2020; 2024

Guatemala competed in the Summer Olympic Games for the first time at the 1952 Summer Olympics in Helsinki, Finland. 21 competitors, 20 men and 1 woman, took part in 26 events in 6 sports.

== Cycling ==
Track Competition

Men's 1.000m Time Trial

- Gustavo Martínez

- Final – 1:18.9 (→ 24th place)

Men's 1.000m Sprint Scratch Race

- Gustavo Martínez – 26th place

== Fencing ==
Three fencers, all men, represented Guatemala in 1952.

Men's foil

- Rubén Soberón
- Eduardo López

Men's épée

- Rubén Soberón
- Antonio Chocano
- Eduardo López

Men's sabre

- Eduardo López

== Shooting ==
Three shooters represented Guatemala in 1952.

25 m pistol

- José Gómez
- Francisco Sandoval

50 m pistol

- Francisco Sandoval

300 m rifle, three positions

- Alfredo Mury

50 m rifle, prone

- José Gómez
- Alfredo Mury

== Swimming ==
Men

Ranks given are within the heat.

Athlete	Event	Heat		Semifinal		Final	
Athlete	Event	Time	Rank	Time	Rank	Time	Rank
José Valdes	100 m freestyle	1:04.5	6	Did not advance			
