= Petre Cișmigiu =

Romanian athlete and engineer (1915–2006)

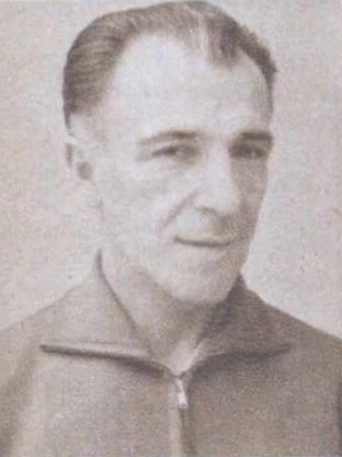
- Cișmigiu in 1966

Personal information
- Born: 12 June 1915 Bolgrad, Bessarabia Governorate, Russian Empire (now Ukraine)
- Died: 2006 (aged 90–91)
- Education: Bucharest Polytechnic
- Occupations: Civil engineer; coach; civil servant; sports writer
- Years active: 1942–c. 2002
- Spouse: Lala Malvina

Sport
- Sport: Sports shooting
- Club: Telefon Club (1940s); National Bank of Romania; CS Dinamo; Metalul Energia

Petre or Petru Cișmigiu, also credited as Cișmigu (Russian: Петре Чишмиджиу; 12 June 1915 – 2006), was a Romanian sports shooter, coach, sports expert, and civil engineer. A native of Bessarabia and graduate of the Bucharest Polytechnic, he worked for a while in designing telephone exchanges, and debuted as a shooter during World War II, with Telefon Club. After obtaining significant results in internal competitions, he qualified for the national shooting team during the first years of the Romanian communist regime. From early 1948, Cișmigiu was an official of the Romanian Shooting Sport Federation (FRT), emerging as a player-coach of the national squad in the early 1950s; his club affiliations were with the National Bank of Romania (BNR), CS Dinamo, and finally Metalul Energia. He competed in several international matches, appearing at the 50 m rifle, prone event of the 1952 Summer Olympics. Though he retired from playing shortly after, he was called up as a coach at subsequent Olympic events, with contributions that were initially criticized as unsatisfactory. He also began publishing guides to shooting and works of history on the sports, as well as inventing a scoring gauge.

In the 1960s, Cișmigiu became an expert and referee for the International Shooting Sport Federation, which awarded him honorary gold and silver medals. His involvement with the international body and its various affiliates also led him to become a technical adviser and designer of several shooting ranges, from Phoenix, Arizona, to Tokyo. Caught up in a simmering conflict with the FRT, he was coach of several other national federations and squads, and received special honors from the Mexican Federation of Shooting and Hunting. After the Romanian Revolution of 1989, Cișmigiu tried to revive sport shooting in Romania, but concluded that the regional authorities were ignoring him. As an octogenarian, he tried to obtain increased pension rights for himself and other non-Olympic champions. He died in 2006, some four years after publishing a final textbook on pistol-shooting.

== Early life and playing career ==
In a 1999 article, sports journalist Andrei Dicu noted that Cișmigiu's native area was "somewhere in the present-day Republic of Moldova." According to standardized records, he was born on 12 June 1915 at Bolgrad, in the Russian Empire's Bessarabia Governorate (currently in Ukraine). He lived his youth in Greater Romania, graduating from the Bucharest Polytechnic's Civil Engineering Department. He was thereafter employed by the Romanian Telephone Company, including throughout World War II. He was involved with designing telephone exchanges in Bucharest (Banu Manta), Cluj and Sibiu. Cișmigiu was inducted into the company sports squad, the Telefon Club, during 1942, and, by November 1945, was announced in Gazeta Sporturilor as a "revelation of these latest competitions." He took eleventh place at the national rifle, standing championship in December (a competition won by Sorin Cantili). He won his first national competition, the General Confederation of Labor Cup 1946, with Telefon Club—also setting a national record.

After the proclamation of the Romanian People's Republic on 30 December 1947, Cișmigiu joined the team of engineers at the Ministry of Electrical Power, and transferred to the sports club formed at the BNR. He was selected for the Romanian national team after tryouts in March 1948. In May, he was voted in as secretary of the FRT, and also designated to represent Romania in Budapest, at the centennial cup of the Hungarian Shooting Federation. In March 1949, he represented BNR at a club competition which doubled as training for the national squad, as well as a celebration of the Communist Youth; he took second place, after Penait Călcâi. By May 1950 he was Romania's player-coach, preparing the squad for an international face-off against the Hungarian team. Cișmigiu was sent to the 1952 ISSF World Shooting Championships in Oslo and that year's Summer Olympics in Helsinki (placing 20th in the men's 50 m rifle, prone). That edition, which also had him as a coach, marked the first of his seven appearances as an Olympic referee.

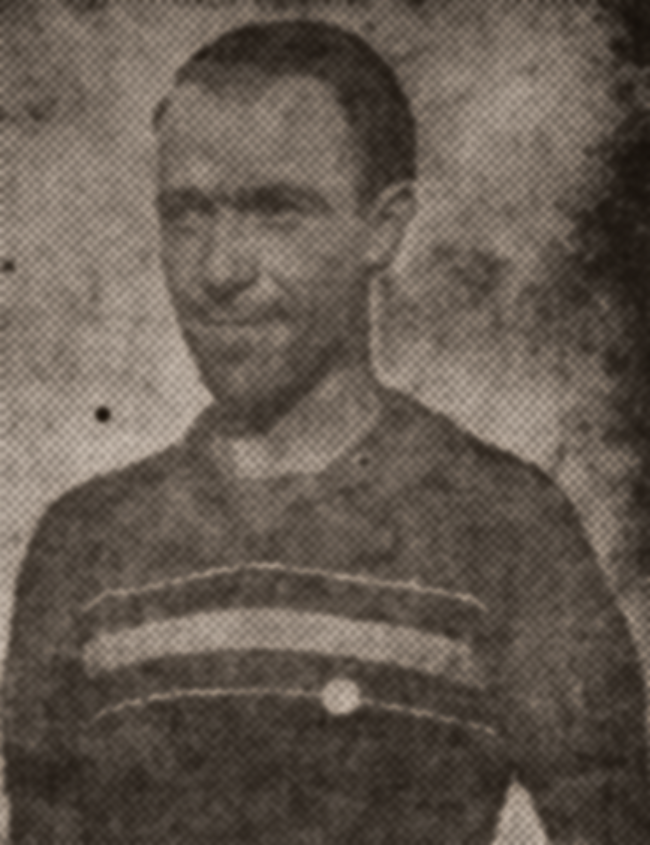
Cișmigiu in 1953

Cișmigiu's affiliation was with CS Dinamo, where he personally founded a shooting department. His final club was Metalul Energia, with which he won four national titles in 1952–1954. During July 1954, he appeared in the combined competition at an exhibition match against France, whose star player was Jacques Mazoyer. Mazoyer met the then-standing world record, scoring 596 points and first place; Cișmigiu outscored Paul Konsler to come in second, with a one-point difference against Mazoyer, which was also the new national scoring record. In October of the same year, he appeared at international championships organized by the Romanian state. His performance was judged as underwhelming in the local sports press: while his colleague Henry Herscovici had taken 400 out of a possible 400 points in his trial, Cișmigiu had taken third place in his. He was however the republican champion in individual, supine and individual, combined competitions, both in June 1955. At the 1955 European Shooting Championships, held at Tunari near Bucharest, Cișmigiu placed seventh in the supine position, with 597 points.

Cișmigiu maintained the office of national coach after retiring from the playing squad; as such, he coached at Melbourne 1956 and Rome 1960. His contribution during the latter was formally censured by Romanian officials, who argued that he had been too lenient toward shooters under his supervision. He reportedly underwent a session of criticism, upon the end of which he recognized his faults. Cișmigiu had by then authored a specialty work, the 1954 Tirul cu arma sport ("Shooting Weapons for Sport"), which included detailed technical instructions. In 1962–1963, he publicized his invention of a "measuring rod"-type of gauge, which helped reduce fluctuations in score-keeping. He helped organize the 1965 European Shooting Championships, for which he supervised expansions to the Tunari range.

== International expert ==
Upon retiring from competitions, Cișmigiu had become an expert of the International Shooting Sport Federation (ISSF). It awarded him honorary silver and gold medals, which he treasured alongside a diploma of merit from the International Olympic Committee. In mid-1969, he was invited to a shooting competition in Phoenix, Arizona, and provided technical guidance for the National Rifle Association of India. He worked on designing shooting ranges in Phoenix, Thun, Munich and Tokyo. At home, he worked for the Union for Physical Education and Sports, helping to design its Conta Street headquarters, as well its sporting arenas in Floreasca and Poiana Brașov. He edited several new expert works on shooting, and was a regular contributor to ISSF bulletins. In 1970, Editura Stadion published his book Tineretul și tirul sportiv ("Youth and Sports Shooting"), which featured a history of the sport, as well as advice for beginners.

In 1966, Cișmigiu was credited by the journalists at Sportul Popular with instilling "seriousness" in the Olympic team, including in top-performing newcomers such as Virgil Atanasiu and Marcel Roșca. He appeared as a coach for Tokyo 1964, Mexico City 1968, Munich 1972, and finally Montreal 1976. At the end of his Olympic career, his players had won nine Olympic medals, including three gold ones. From March 1968, he had been proclaimed a coach-emeritus by an assembly of Romanian sporting association, including the Romanian Olympic and Sports Committee and the Council for Physical Education and Sports. His performance in Mexico was recognized by the communist state, which awarded him the Meritul Sportiv medal, 3rd class, in November 1968. As an FRT trainer, in May 1972 he joined the official delegation at the continental skeet shooting championship, held in Francoist Spain (at Eurovillas). He also appeared at the 1975 European 10 m Events Championships, as both Romania's coach and an international referee.

Between 1969 and 1975, the Mexican Federation of Shooting and Hunting ran a "Romanian Tournament", which awarded the Petre Cișmigiu Challenger Cup. As Cișmigiu reported, this created tensions between him and the Romanian communist establishment, which insisted that the cup needed to be validated by the FRT. He retired from his Romanian career in 1976, after a pronged dispute with the communist-backed FRT. He noted having been shunned by the sporting community, except for Alexandru Șiperco, who remained his supporter. Cișmigiu had stints coaching a succession of national teams: Italy, Spain, Sweden, and Japan, managing three Olympic medals with the latter, and had temporary advisory roles in both Mexico and Puerto Rico, as well as in Brazil and Colombia. In the latter country, he published the Spanish-language guide Tiro con pistola ("Shooting with Pistols").

== Old age and death ==
Following the Romanian Revolution of 1989, Cișmigiu was again heard by the FRT, participating in its first post-communist session of 1992. There and in a summary for Libertatea, he reported on the sport's apparently terminal decline, especially after the trade unions had refused to sponsor their respective clubs and rosters. He asked that the federation be directly sponsored by the Ministry of Sports, and proposed that it receive ownership over the forested park outside Tunari. He continued to submit projects for the revival of sports shooting in Romania, but complained that the FRT was ignoring him. In an interview with Dicu, he provided details on the 1964 death of his colleague Iosif Sîrbu, revealing that Sîrbu had been pressured by the communist apparatus into committing suicide, and reading out a final note that had been retrieved from the Securitate archives.

Cișmigiu's wife, Lala Malvina, died as a result of "medical negligence" in July 2000. He was reportedly depressed, having seen her die "before my eyes" at Bucharest's Elias Hospital, and was living on his own in an apartment near Victory Square. His main focus was on writing his memoirs and a minute history of Romanian sports shooting. In 2001, he supported increased pension rights for athletes such as Constantin Antonescu, Gheorghe Fiat, and Mihai Nedef, who, like him, had never won an Olympic title—despite their record as European or world champions; he described the pension gap between the two categories as a form of state-enforced discrimination. Cișmigiu eventually returned to publishing with a 2002 work, Tirul sportiv cu pistolul ("The Pistol in Shooting Sports"). He is known to have died in 2006.
