= Ben-Dov =

Ben-Dov or Ben Dov (Hebrew: בן דב) is a Jewish patronymic surname meaning "son of Dov. Notable people with the surname include:

- Dov Ben-Dov (1927–2020), Israeli sports shooter
- Hanna Ben Dov (1919–2008), Israeli abstract painter
- Ilan Ben-Dov (businessman) (born 1957), Israeli businessman and investor
- Nitza Ben-Dov (born 1950), Professor of Hebrew and Comparative Literature at the University of Haifa
- Shabtai Ben-Dov (1924–1978), Israeli philosopher
- Tova Ben-Dov, President of the Women's International Zionist Organization
- Ya'acov Ben-Dov (1882–1968), Israeli photographer and a pioneer of Jewish cinematography in Palestine
- Yaron Ben-Dov (1970–2017), Israeli football player
- Yosi Ben-Dov (born 1950), Israeli educator
