= Medvedenko =

Medvedenko is a patronymic surname derived with the Ukrainian patronymic suffix -enko from the Russian work medved for "bear" (the Ukrainian word is vedmid). Notable people with the surname include:

- Aleksandr Medvedenko, birth name of Aleksandr Dov, Soviet Ukrainian and Israeli singer-songwriter
- Andriy Medvedenko (born 1951), Ukrainian poet, Merited Culture Worker of Ukraine
- Slava Medvedenko, Ukrainian basketballer
- Valentyna Medvedenko (1941–2014), Ukrainian actress, People's Artist of Ukraine

== Fictional characters ==
- Semyon Medvedenko in Anton Chekhov's play The Seagull and its adaptations
