= Batun =

Batun باتون
- Village
- Location within Iran
- Coordinates: 30°14′13″N 51°20′04″E
- Country: Iran
- Province: Fars
- County: Mamasani
- Bakhsh: Central
- Rural District: Bakesh-e Do

Population (2006)
  - Total: 197
- Time zone: UTC+3:30 (IRST)
  - Summer (DST): UTC+4:30 (IRDT)

Batun (Persian: باتون, also Romanized as Bātūn and Bāţūn) is a village in Bakesh-e Do Rural District, in the Central District of Mamasani County, Fars province, Iran. At the 2006 census, its population was 197, in 44 families.

== See also ==
- Arieh Batun-Kleinstub (born 1933), Israeli Olympic high jumper
