= Eliraz =

Eliraz is a surname. Notable people with the surname include:

- Alexander Eliraz (1914–2004), Israeli sports shooter
- Israel Eliraz (1936–2016), Israeli poet
