= Israel at the 1952 Summer Olympics =

- IOC code: ISR
- NOC: Olympic Committee of Israel

in Helsinki
- Competitors: 25 (22 men, 3 women) in 5 sports
- Flag bearer: Abraham Shneior
- Medals: Gold 0 Silver 0 Bronze 0 Total 0

Summer Olympics appearances (overview)
- 1952; 1956; 1960; 1964; 1968; 1972; 1976; 1980; 1984; 1988; 1992; 1996; 2000; 2004; 2008; 2012; 2016; 2020; 2024

Israel competed in the Summer Olympic Games for the first time at the 1952 Summer Olympics in Helsinki, Finland. 25 competitors, 22 men and 3 women, took part in 17 events in 5 sports.

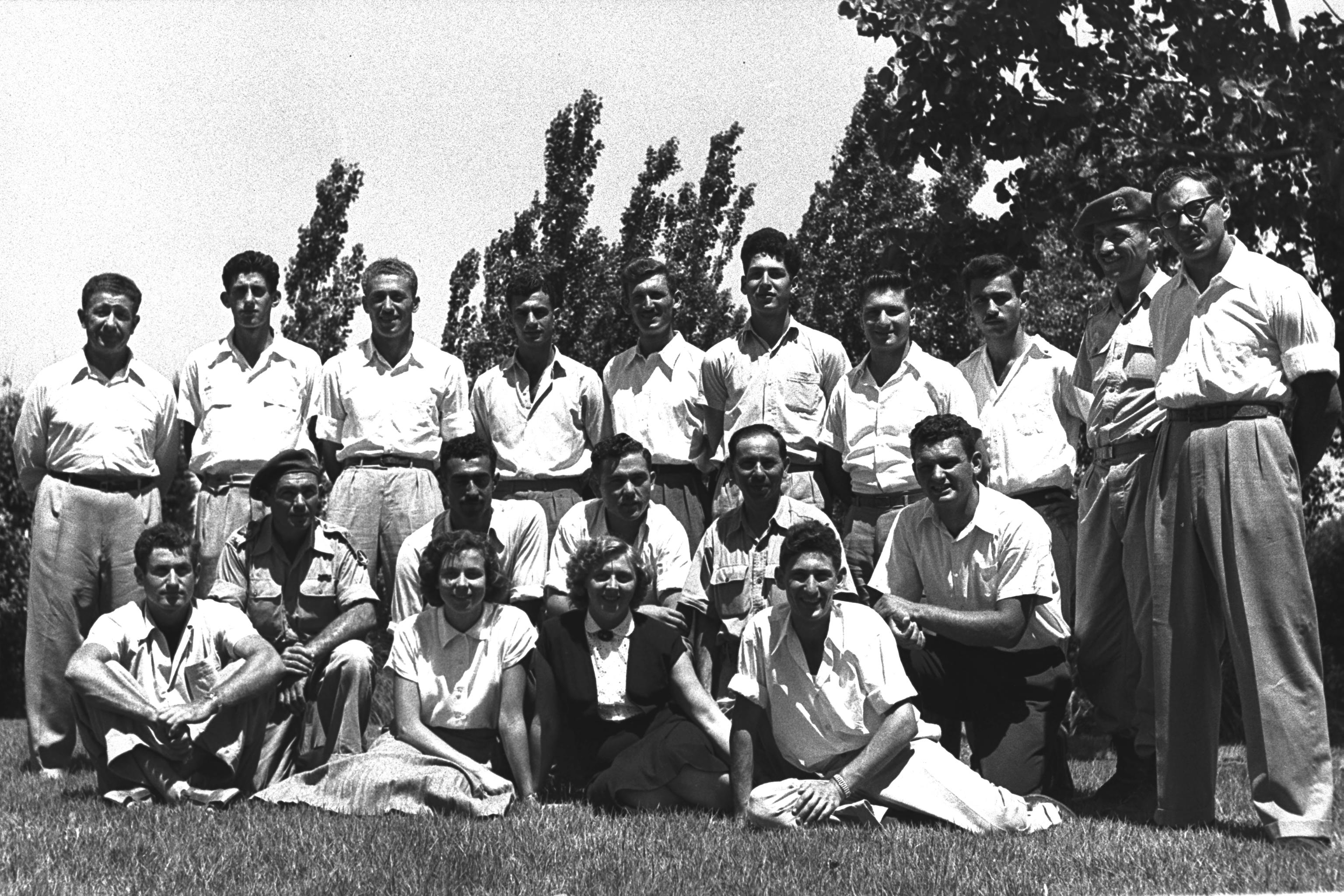
First Israeli Olympic Team, 1952

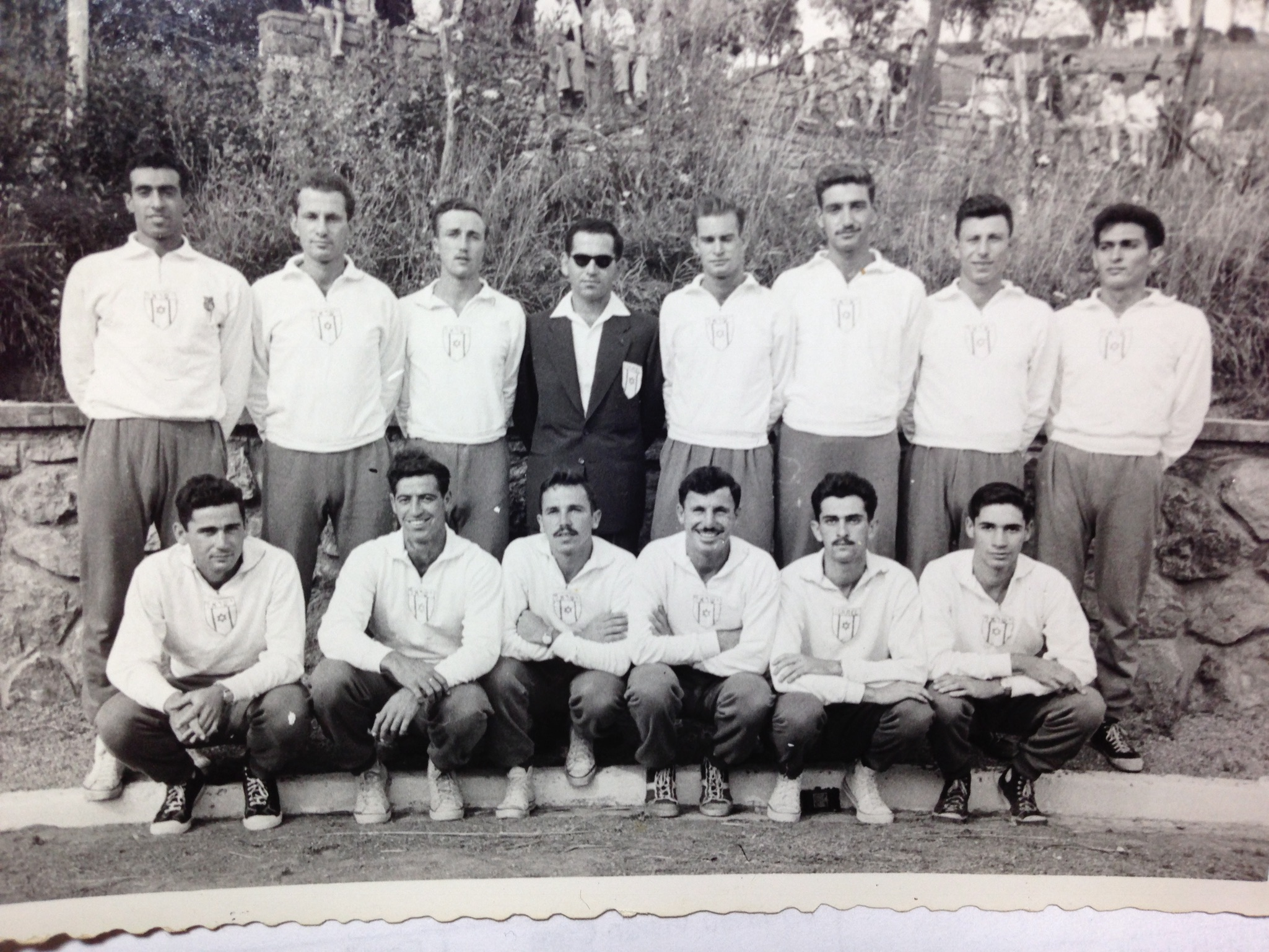
Israeli Olympic Basketball team 1952

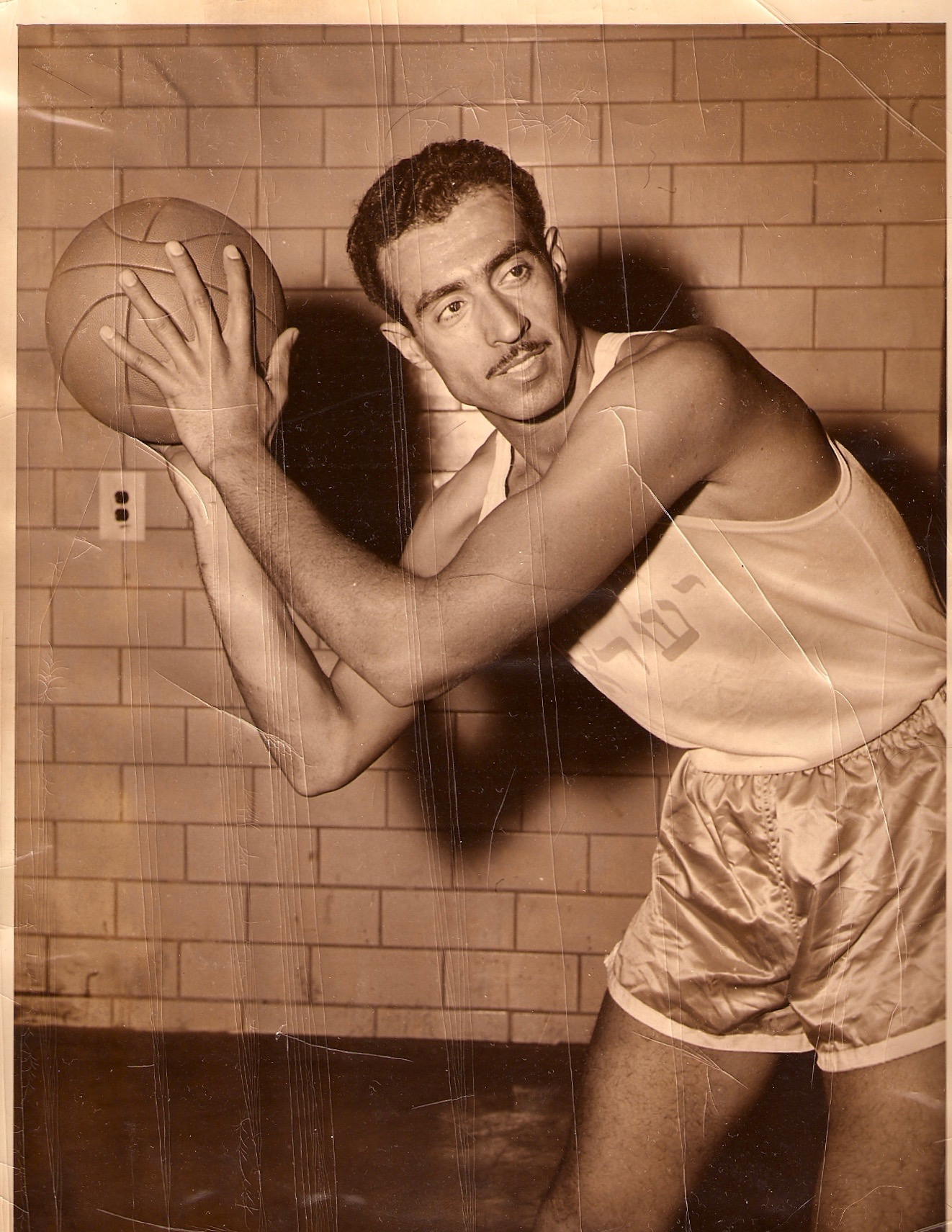
Zacharia Ofri (captain of Israeli Olympic basketball team). 1952

== Results by event ==
=== Athletics ===
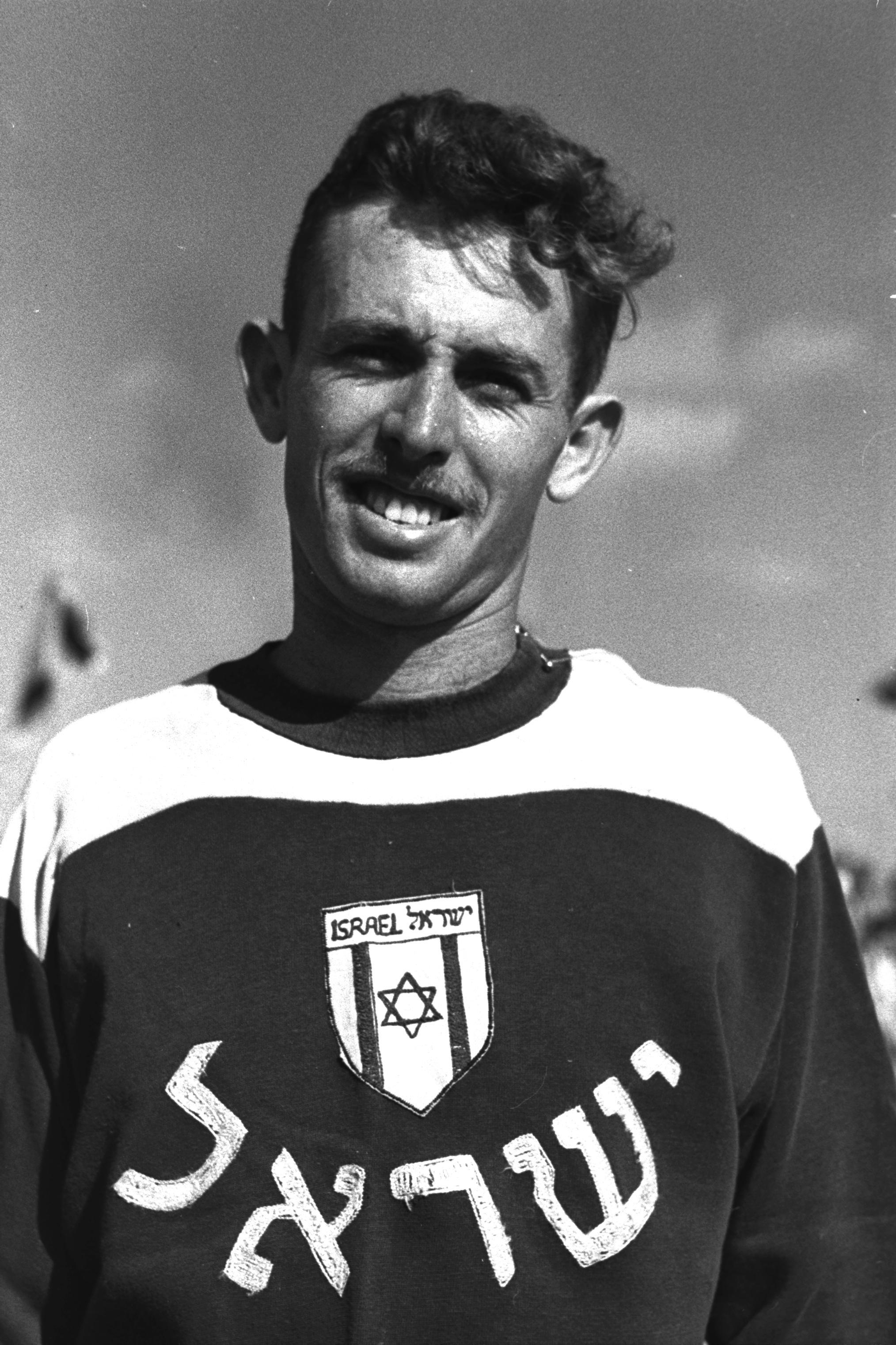
Arieh Batun-Kleinstub

Event	Participant	Result	Ref
Men's 100 metres	David Tabak	First round, heat 6 – 10.9 seconds (1st place); Second round, heat 3 – 10.9 seconds (6th place)	
Men's 200 metres	David Tabak	First round, heat 6 – 22.4 seconds (1st place); Second round, heat 4 – 21.8 seconds (5th place)	
Men's 400 metres	Aryeh Glick-Gill	First round, heat 5 – 50.2 seconds (5th place)	
Men's 800 metres	Aryeh Glick-Gill	First round, heat 7 – 2:00.9 minutes (6th place)	
Men's high jump	Arieh Batun-Kleinstub	Qualifying – 1.70 metres (did not qualify)	
Men's discus	Orion Gallin	Qualifying – 40.76 metres (32nd; did not qualify)	
Women's 80 metres hurdles	Leah Horovitz-Ravid	First round – 12.4 seconds (6th place)	
Women's high jump	Tamar Mettal-Schumacher	1.40 metres (17th place)	
Women's long jump	Tamar Mettal-Schumacher	Qualifying – 5.16 metres (29th; did not qualify)	
Women's discus	Olga Winterberg	Qualifying – 35.79 metres (did not qualify)	

=== Basketball ===
Event	Participants	Result	Ref
Men's team competition	Coach: Tubby Raskin: Dan Erez-Buxenbaum; Moshe Daniel-Levy; Yehuda Wiener-Gafni; Mordechai-Marcel Hefez; Fredi Cohen; Amos Lin-Linkovski; Zekarya Ofri; Eliahu Amiel; Reuben Fecher-Perach; Menahem Kurman-Degani; Ralph Klein; Shimon Shelah-Schmuckler; Abraham Shneior	Qualification round (Group B) – Did not advance Lost to Philippines (47-57); Lost to Greece (52-54)	

=== Diving ===
Event	Participant	Result	Ref
Men's 3m springboard	Yoav Raanan	Preliminary round – 67.70 points (9th place)	
Men's 10m platform	Yoav Raanan	Preliminary round – 58.15 points (30th place)	

=== Shooting ===
Four shooters represented Israel in 1952.

Event	Participant	Result	Ref
300 m rifle, three positions	Dov Ben-Dov	1033 points (21st place)	
300 m rifle, three positions	Shmuel Laviv-Lubin	973 points (26th place)	
50 m rifle, prone	Zvi Pinkas	388 points (41st place)	
50 m rifle, prone	Alexander Eliraz	381 points (56th place)	
50 m rifle, three positions	Zvi Pinkas	1077 points (41st place)	
50 m rifle, three positions	Alexander Eliraz	1059 points (44th place)	

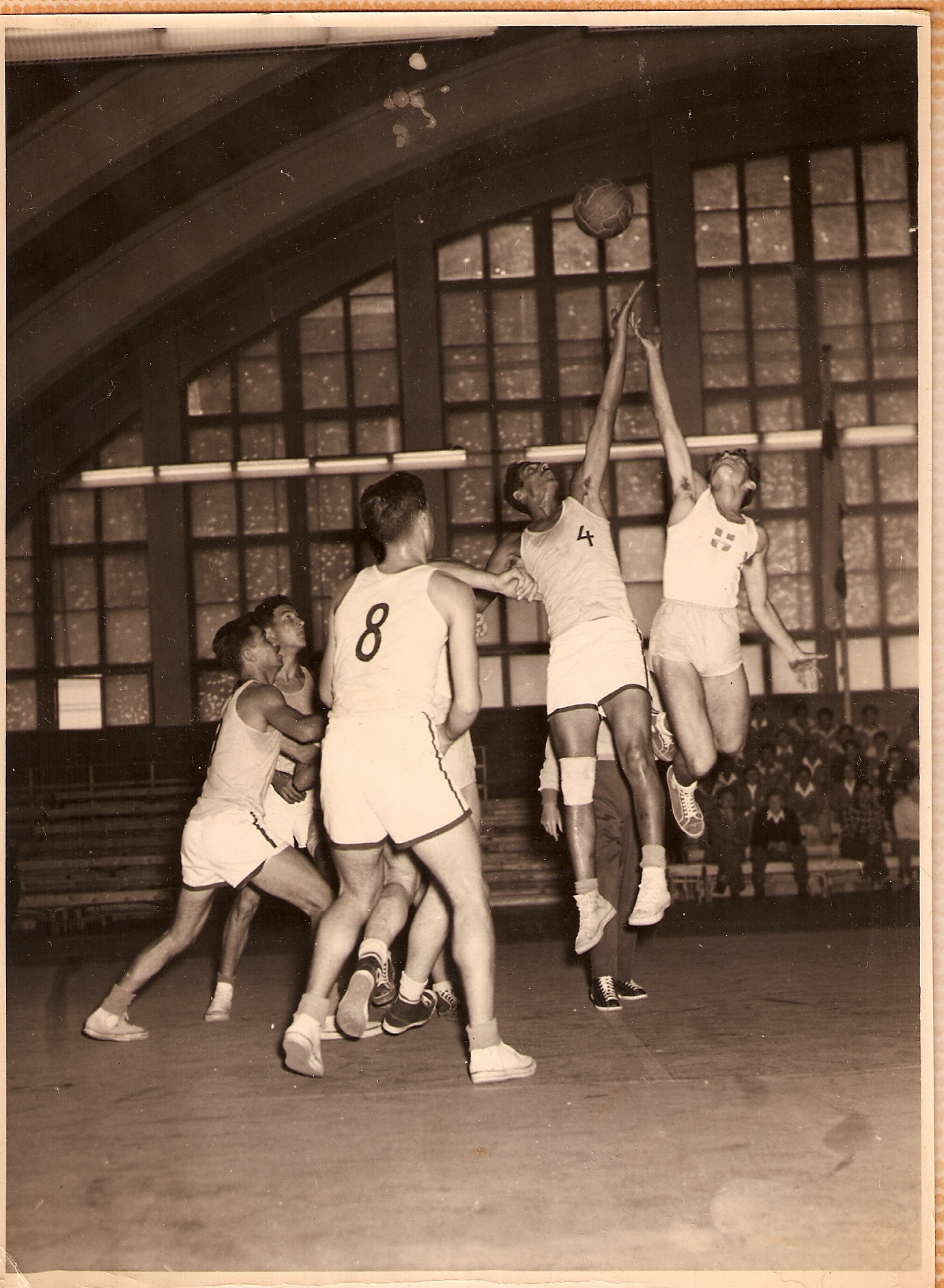
Israel vs Philippines, 1952 Olympics. Zacharia Ofri (#4) tipping off the ball.

=== Swimming ===
Event	Participant	Result	Ref
Men's 100 metres freestyle	David-Norbert Buch	First round, heat 1 – 1:05.6 (7th place)	
