= Souren =

Souren is both a given name and a surname.

Notable people with the given name include:

- Souren Barseghyan (born 1959), Armenian association football manager
- Souren Bose (1924–1997), Indian communist
- Souren Choudhury (1918-?), Indian sports shooter
- Souren Melikian (born 1936), French-Iranian art historian, art critic, and curator

Notable people with the surname include:

- Nicky Souren (born 1999), Dutch footballer
- Scarlett Souren (born 2003), Dutch racing cyclist
