= Jovan Kratohvil =

Yugoslav sports shooter

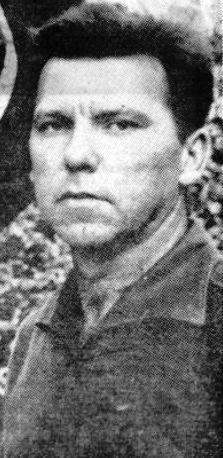

Personal information
- Born: 17 April 1924 Belgrade, Yugoslavia
- Died: 22 February 1998 (aged 73) Belgrade, Serbia

Sport
- Sport: Sports shooting

Jovan Kratohvil (17 April 1924 – 22 February 1998) was a Yugoslav sports shooter. He competed in the 300 m rifle, three positions event at the 1952 Summer Olympics.
