= Stjepan Prauhardt =

Personal information
- Born: 5 December 1904
- Died: 1 October 1983 (aged 78)

Sport
- Sport: Sports shooting

Stjepan Prauhardt (5 December 1904 – 1 October 1983) was a Yugoslav sports shooter. He competed in the 300 m rifle, three positions event at the 1952 Summer Olympics.
