= John Pearson (sport shooter) =

British sports shooter

Personal information
- Born: 31 March 1926; Preston, England
- Died: 2 November 1994 (aged 68); Preston, England

Sport
- Sport: Sports shooting

John Pearson (31 March 1926 – 2 November 1994) was a British sports shooter. He competed in the 300 m rifle, three positions event at the 1952 Summer Olympics.
