= Jan Azam =

Pakistani sports shooter

Personal information
- Born: 1 July 1924

Sport
- Sport: Sports shooting

Jan Azam (born 1 July 1924) was a Pakistani sports shooter. He competed in the 50 m rifle, prone event at the 1952 Summer Olympics.
