= Albert Sigl =

German sports shooter

Personal information
- Born: 15 October 1911 Reisbach, German Empire
- Died: 6 November 1969 (aged 58) Karlsruhe, West Germany

Sport
- Sport: Sports shooting
- Events: 50 metre rifle prone 50 metre rifle three positions

Albert Sigl (15 October 1911 – 6 November 1969) was a German sports shooter. He competed at the 1952 Summer Olympics in the 50 metre rifle, prone and 50 metre rifle three positions events. He also completed at 1956 Summer Olympics in the 50 metre rifle, prone and 50 metre rifle three positions events.
