= Tamara Metal =

Israeli athlete (1933–2022)

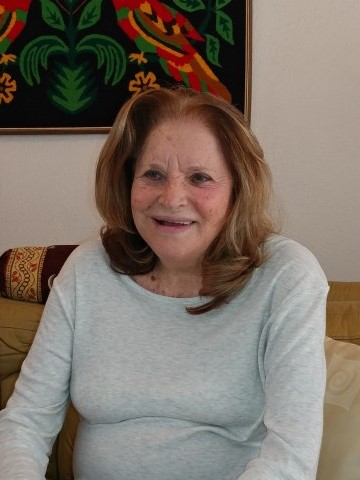

Personal information
- Nationality: Israeli
- Born: תמר מיטל-שומכר; 26 December 1933 Poland
- Died: 15 July 2022 (aged 88) Israel

Sport
- Sport: Basketball; Track & field
- Events: High jump; Long jump

Achievements and titles
- Personal bests: high jump: 1.50 (1952); long jump: 5.34 (1952)

Tamara Metal (-Shumacher; also "Matal"; Hebrew: תמר מיטל-שומכר; 26 December 1933 – 15 July 2022) was an Israeli former Olympic high jumper and long jumper, and former captain of the Israel women's national basketball team.

== Early and personal life ==
Metal was born in Poland to a Jewish family who immigrated to Mandatory Palestine in 1935, when she was two years old. She married "Shumi" Shumacher, who organized the third through seventh Maccabiah Games.

== Sports career ==
Her personal bests were 1.50 in the high jump, and 5.34 in the long jump (both in 1952).

In 1950, Metal was captain of the Israel women's national basketball team, and also competed in the high jump and the long jump.

Metal competed for Israel at the 1952 Summer Olympics in Helsinki at the age of 18. She was Israel's flag-bearer at the Games, and captained Israel's track and field team. In the Women's High Jump she came in 17th with a height of 1.40, and in the Women's Long Jump she came in 29th with a distance of 5.16.

She was chosen as torch bearer at the 1973 Maccabiah Games, but Metal recited the Vow of the Maccabiah Games instead because she was pregnant. In 1976, she was chosen by the International Olympic Committee to travel to Greece and participate in the lighting of the Olympic Torch which would be carried to Montreal, for the Olympic Games. After she stopped competing herself, she coached women's basketball.
