= Kóka =

- Coat of arms

- Location of Kóka in Hungary
- Coordinates: 47.48650°N 19.57883°E
- Country: Hungary
- Region: Central Hungary
- County: Pest
- Subregion: Nagykátai
- Rank: Village

Area
  - Total: 44.36 km^{2} (17.13 sq mi)

Population (1 January 2008)
  - Total: 4,508
  - Density: 101.6/km^{2} (263.2/sq mi)
- Time zone: UTC+1 (CET)
  - Summer (DST): UTC+2 (CEST)
- Postal code: 2243
- Area code: +36 29
- KSH code: 31361
- Website: www.koka.hu

Kóka is a village in Pest county, Hungary. Olympian János Dosztály was born here.
