= Saad El-Din El-Shorbagui =

Egyptian sports shooter

Personal information
- Born: 21 July 1920
- Died: 9 October 1992 (aged 72)

Sport
- Sport: Sports shooting

Saad El-Din El-Shorbagui (21 July 1920 – 9 October 1992) was an Egyptian sports shooter. He competed in the 300 m rifle, three positions event at the 1952 Summer Olympics.
