= Lily Ebert =

Hungarian-born Holocaust survivor (1923–2024)

Lily Ebert MBE BEM
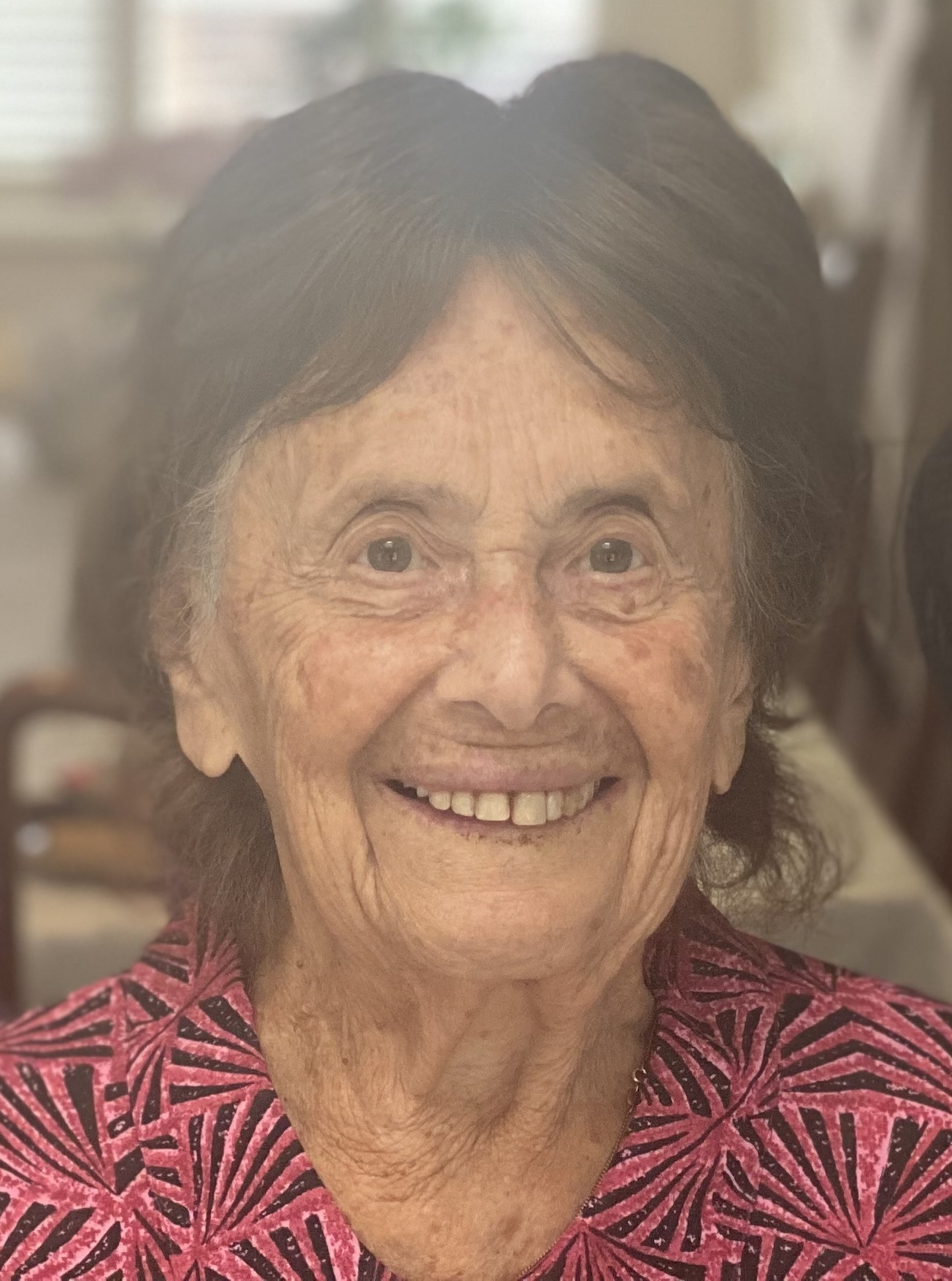
- Ebert in 2021
- Born: Engelman Lívia; 29 December 1923; Bonyhád, Hungary
- Died: 9 October 2024 (aged 100); London, England
- Known for: Holocaust survivor; Lily's Promise: How I Survived Auschwitz and Found the Strength to Live published with Dov Forman; Media appearances and social media videos
- Relatives: Dov Forman (great-grandson)

Lily Ebert MBE BEM (born Engelman Lívia, 29 December 1923 – 9 October 2024) was a Hungarian-born British writer and Holocaust survivor, who in her later life became notable for her memoir, and social media videos and media appearances documenting her life as a survivor of the genocide.

== Early life ==
Ebert was born in Bonyhád, Hungary. She was the eldest daughter in a Jewish family of six children and lived in London, England from 1967 onwards.

== World War II years and the Holocaust ==
Nazi Germany invaded Hungary in March 1944, and, in July 1944, when Ebert was 20 years old, she along with her mother, younger brother and three sisters were deported to Auschwitz-Birkenau. Ebert's mother Nina, younger brother Bela, and younger sister Berta were immediately sent to the gas chambers, whilst she and her two other sisters, Renee and Piri, were spared, as they were selected for work in the camp.

Four months after arriving in the camp, Ebert and her two sisters were transferred to a munitions factory near Leipzig, where they worked until liberation by Allied forces from the death march in 1945.

After she was liberated, Ebert travelled with her surviving sisters to Switzerland in order to start rebuilding their life. In 1953 Ebert was reunited with her other brother, who had also survived the Nazi camp and slave-labour system. The family emigrated to Israel where she married and had three children, before settling in London in 1967. Ebert had 10 grandchildren, 38 great-grandchildren and one great-great-grandchild.

== Memoirs ==
In 2021, during the COVID-19 pandemic, with her great-grandson Dov Forman, Ebert co-authored Lily's Promise: How I Survived Auschwitz and Found the Strength to Live, which includes a foreword by Prince Charles. It is a five-time Sunday Times bestseller and was Waterstones best history book of 2021. Lily's Promise is also a three-time New York Times bestseller, debuting at number 2, and was chosen as the Costco US buyers' pick for May 2022.

Also in 2021, Ebert and Forman used the video platform TikTok, gaining more than a million followers for clips in which Ebert answered people's questions about surviving the Holocaust, when she was a prisoner at Auschwitz concentration camp. Ebert and Forman's account has over 1.7 million followers; has received over 25 million 'likes' and their top 5 most popular videos have collectively been viewed by over 50 million people.

Ebert and Forman collaborated with various departments of the UK Government (including the Department for Education, the Foreign Office, the Home Office and the Department for Levelling Up, Housing and Communities), and in November 2020, they spoke at the UK Parliament in favour of the UK Holocaust Memorial and Learning Centre. Ebert and Forman also appeared on international radio and television, giving interviews to over 180 news outlets in more than 35 countries.

Ebert's portrait was one of Seven Portraits: Surviving the Holocaust commissioned by former Prince Charles for the Royal Collection to remember survivors of the Holocaust and as a tribute for the survivors who made their life in Britain. When the portraits were released in the Queen's Gallery at Buckingham Palace in 2022. Ebert told Charles "Meeting you, it is for everyone who lost their lives." Charles touched her shoulder and replied: "But it is a greater privilege for me."

When Ebert was liberated in 1945, she met U.S. soldier Hayman Shulman. With no paper to hand, he scribbled a message of hope onto a German banknote and gave it to Lily. In 2022, after a viral social media campaign, the family of Private Shulman were located, resulting in the meeting between Lily and the children of the soldier who liberated her.

In 2023, a volume of Shemot (the Hebrew name for the Book of Exodus), signed by Ebert's younger brother Bela, who was murdered in Auschwitz, was discovered. The book had remained in Ebert's hometown of Bonyhád for decades. Recognizing the surname, a person whose father owned an antique shop purchased the book and contacted Lily's great-grandson, Dov Forman. Forman then traveled to Bonyhád to retrieve the book and brought it to London.

== Centenary and death ==
On her 100th birthday on 29 December 2023, King Charles III sent her a personal letter congratulating her, praising her "extraordinary strength of spirit, resilience, and courage".

Ebert died at home in London on 9 October 2024, at the age of 100. King Charles III stated that Ebert was "an integral part of the fabric of our nation", and Prime Minister Keir Starmer stated that "we must now keep our promise to her" to sustain her message.

== Honours and awards ==
Ebert was awarded the British Empire Medal (BEM) in the 2016 New Year Honours for services to Holocaust education and awareness. She was appointed Member of the Order of the British Empire (MBE) in the 2023 New Year Honours for services to Holocaust education. On 31 January 2023, in an investiture ceremony at Windsor Castle, she received the award from King Charles III.

Ebert's great-grandson Dov Forman received the Points of Light award from Boris Johnson, the UK Prime Minister at 10 Downing Street, in November 2021, in recognition of exceptional services to Holocaust education.

Ebert and Forman were awarded the community award by broadcaster Andrew Neil at the Jewish Care and Topland business lunch in March 2022, at the Grosvenor House Hotel.

In April 2022, Ebert was awarded the Knight's Cross of the Order of Merit of Hungary, one of Hungary's highest national honours, by Ambassador Ferenc Kumin of Hungary to the United Kingdom, on behalf of the President and the Hungarian government.

In May 2022, Ebert was the winner of the inaugural Simon Wiesenthal Prize. At a ceremony in the Austrian parliament, Ebert was given the award for civic engagement against antisemitism and for education about the Holocaust. The award was presented by the European Commission's coordinator on combating antisemitism. The commissioner praised Ebert for her decades-long engagement as a witness to the Holocaust and her recent turn to TikTok, a platform on which she and her great-grandson Dov Forman amassed over 1.9 million followers and brought her life story to a whole new audience.

Country	Date	Appointment	Ribbon	Post-nominal letters	Notes
United Kingdom	31 December 2015	British Empire Medal		BEM	
Hungary	April 2022	Knight's Cross of the Order of Merit of Hungary			
United Kingdom	30 December 2022	Member of the Order of the British Empire		MBE	
