= Alberto Braga =

Brazilian sports shooter

Personal information
- Born: 7 February 1929 Rio de Janeiro, Brazil
- Died: 29 April 2004 (aged 75) Rio de Janeiro, Brazil

Sport
- Sport: Sports shooting

Alberto Braga (7 February 1929 – 29 April 2004) was a Brazilian sports shooter. He competed in the 300 m rifle, three positions event at the 1952 Summer Olympics.
