= Robert Sandager =

American sports shooter

Personal information
- Born: December 24, 1914 Lisbon, North Dakota, United States
- Died: March 25, 2010 (aged 95) Minneapolis, Minnesota, United States

Sport
- Sport: Sports shooting

Robert Sandager (December 24, 1914 – March 25, 2010) was an American sports shooter. He competed in the 300 m rifle, three positions event at the 1952 Summer Olympics.
