= Hans Eschenbrenner =

German sports shooter

Personal information
- Born: 7 November 1910 Bexbach, Germany
- Died: 9 July 2007 (aged 96) Bexbach, Germany

Sport
- Sport: Sports shooting

Hans Eschenbrenner (7 November 1910 – 9 July 2007) was a German sports shooter who represented Saar. He competed in the 50 m rifle, prone event at the 1952 Summer Olympics.
