= David Tabak =

Israeli sprinter

David Tabak (Hebrew: דוד טבק; August 5, 1927 – July 21, 2012) was an Israeli Olympic runner who specialized in sprinting.

== Early and personal life ==
Tabak was born in Moshav Beit Oved, Mandatory Palestine. He studied in Mikve Israel, outside of Tel Aviv, and became a school teacher.

His son Benny Tabak was a striker for Maccabi Tel Aviv and the Israel national football team, and his daughter Eti was a sprinter.

Tabak died at age 85, and was buried in Ramat Hasharon, Israel.

== Running career ==
Tabak competed for Israel at the 1952 Summer Olympics when he was 24 years old, in Helsinki. He ran in the Men's 100 metres, and after winning his first heat came in 6th in the quarterfinals with an Israeli record time of 10.6, which stood for over 14 years. He also ran in the Men's 200 metres, and after winning his first heat came in 5th in the quarterfinals with a time of 21.8, which stood as an Israeli record for 26 years.

== Competition record ==
| Year | Competition | Venue | Position | Event | Notes |
Representing Israel
| 1952 | Olympics | Helsinki, Finland | 6th, Qtr 3 | 100 m | 11.10/10.9 |
