= Erich Spörer =

German sports shooter

Personal information
- Born: 23 April 1911
- Died: 11 November 1977 (aged 66)

Sport
- Sport: Sports shooting

Erich Spörer (23 April 1911 – 11 November 1977) was a German sports shooter. He competed in two events at the 1952 Summer Olympics.
