= Arthur Jackson (American sport shooter) =

American sport shooter

- Jackson with the 1955 Winchester Trophy

Personal information
- Born: May 15, 1918 Brooklyn, New York, U.S.
- Died: January 6, 2015 (aged 96) Concord, New Hampshire, U.S.
- Height: 6 ft 0.5 in (184 cm)
- Weight: 185 lb (84 kg)

Sport
- Sport: Sports shooting
Medal record
Representing United States
Olympic Games
Bronze medal – third place	1952 Helsinki	50 m rifle prone
ISSF World Shooting Championships
Gold medal – first place	1949 Buenos Aires	50+100 m rifle prone position, individual
Gold medal – first place	1952 Oslo	50 m rifle prone position (60 shots), individual
Gold medal – first place	1952 Oslo	50 m rifle prone position (60 shots), team
Gold medal – first place	1952 Oslo	50 m rifle prone position (40 shots), individual
Gold medal – first place	1954 Caracas	50+100 m rifle prone position, team
Silver medal – second place	1949 Buenos Aires	50+100 m rifle prone position, team
Bronze medal – third place	1952 Oslo	300 m standard rifle, individual
Bronze medal – third place	1952 Oslo	50 m rifle prone position (40 shots), team
Pan American Games
Gold medal – first place	1951 Buenos Aires	50 m rifle, three positions, individual
Gold medal – first place	1951 Buenos Aires	50 m rifle, prone, individual
Gold medal – first place	1955 Mexico City	50 m rifle, three positions, individual
Gold medal – first place	1955 Mexico City	50 m rifle, three positions, team
Gold medal – first place	1955 Mexico City	50 m rifle, prone, individual
Gold medal – first place	1955 Mexico City	50 m rifle, prone, team
Gold medal – first place	1955 Mexico City	50 m high power rifle, three positions, team
Silver medal – second place	1951 Buenos Aires	50 m high power rifle, three positions, ind.

Lieutenant Colonel Arthur Charles Jackson (May 15, 1918 – January 6, 2015) was an American competitive sport shooter. In his international career, he won numerous medals across three Summer Olympic Games, three ISSF World Shooting Championships, and two editions of the Pan American Games. He began shooting in the seventh grade and joined the rifle team at Brooklyn Technical High School in 1934. He competed in local and regional tournaments prior to World War II, during which he worked at the Sperry Corporation and later served as a bombardier in the Pacific Theater of Operations. His first international tournament was the 1948 Summer Olympics and his last was the 1956 edition, at which point he began a career in public service with the Central Intelligence Agency in Europe, Asia, and Latin America. He stopped competing at the international level in 1957 and retired from the CIA at the end of 1974. After several years as an instructor and coach, he continued participating in smaller tournaments through the 1990s.

== Early life ==
Jackson was born on May 15, 1918, in Brooklyn. He started shooting during the seventh grade, when his hobby of shooting marbles cost him his job at a dry cleaning and tailoring shop. He attended Brooklyn Technical High School, where he joined the rifle team after saving for a year to afford the fifteen cent ammunition fee for the tryouts. He won his first team event in 1934 at a tournament in New Haven, Connecticut, obtaining individual honors in the process, and followed it up in 1936 with a group trophy and another individual accolade at a competition held at his high school and sponsored by the New York Stock Exchange. Following graduation, he briefly worked at General Motors prior to taking up a position at an engineering firm that specialized in diesel engines.

Jackson also followed his sporting pursuits after graduation and soon joined the Woodhaven American Legion Auxiliary Rifle Club, where his coach was Morris Fisher, a five-time Olympic gold medalist. After taking part in several regional tournaments, with varying degrees of success, he enrolled in the Polytechnic Institute of Brooklyn (now the Polytechnic Institute of New York University) in 1939 and began competing in the collegiate league. His success in local and state events grew and he continued participating in these and regional tournaments prior to the United States' entry into World War II.

== World War II and competitive career ==
By 1942 Jackson had held a job at the Sperry Corporation for several years and his work was considered essential to the war effort. With a brother serving overseas, he was not permitted to train for combat until June 1944, at which point he signed up for the Air Corps branch of the United States Army. He trained to be a bombardier at what is now Webb Air Force Base in Big Spring, Texas, and graduated with the rank of second lieutenant. He served briefly as an instructor and then a combatant in the Pacific Theater of Operations until the surrender of Japan. He left the army in 1946 with the rank of First Lieutenant.

Upon his return to New York, Jackson joined the Long Island Antlers Club and resumed competitive sport shooting, as well as his career at Sperry's. He was admitted into St. John's University on a shooting scholarship, but declined, and instead entered the Clarence H. White School of Modern Photography. During his studies he earned a spot on the United States' delegation to shooting at the 1948 Summer Olympics, where he finished 16th in a field of 36 competitors in the 300 metre rifle three positions event. He then took up a job at the Pratt Institute in the photography department and began training for the 1949 ISSF World Shooting Championships, where he won gold in the 50+100 m rifle prone position individual event and silver in the team version. In 1950 he turned down a position as head of promotions at the Winchester Repeating Arms Company so that he could continue competing, with his next international stop being the 1951 Pan American Games. Here he captured the only two gold medals not won by the Argentinians in individual events, the three positions and prone rifle competitions at 50 meters, as well as silver in the high power rifle, three positions at 50 meters tournament. Upon his return, he was ordered to Lowry Air Force Base in Denver, Colorado, to join the Radar Photo Interpreters' School. Following graduation, he reported to Strategic Air Command in Roswell, New Mexico.

Jackson was eventually sent to Selfridge Air National Guard Base in Michigan to help form the first Air Force Rifle Team and trained at Palm Beach Air Force Base in West Palm Beach, Florida, during the winter months. His next international stop was the 1952 ISSF World Shooting Championships, where he took home gold in the 50 m rifle prone position with 60 (individual and team) and 40 shots (individual) and the bronze in the 300 m standard rifle (individual) and 50 m rifle prone position with 40 shots (team). He then traveled to the 1952 Summer Olympics, where he won a bronze medal in the 50 m rifle prone event and finished 12th in a field of 44 competitors in the 50 m rifle three positions tournament. Upon his return to the United States, he discovered that he had been promoted to the rank of Captain.

The 1954 ISSF World Shooting Championships were dominated by the Soviet Union, but Jackson still managed to take home a gold medal as a member of the United States' 50+100 m rifle prone position team. He fared better at the 1955 Pan American Games, taking home gold medals in both the individual and team versions of the rifle, three positions and prone at 50 meters, as well as the team high power rifle, three positions at 50 meters. He married Nancy Ord in 1956 and began training for that year's Summer Olympics, where he again finished 12th in a field of 44 competitors in the 50 m rifle three positions event and 31st in among 44 participants in the 50 m rifle prone tournament.

== Later life ==
Following the 1956 Games Jackson began working overseas with the Central Intelligence Agency, first in Germany where he joined the Rhein-Main Gun Club. He participated in the 1957 Swiss National Championships and temporarily retired shortly thereafter. He was soon offered a chance to be a judge at the 1958 ISSF World Shooting Championships, but was forced to decline due to his obligations with the CIA. Following his activities in Europe, he settled down in Annandale, Virginia, resumed his CIA duties in Washington, D.C., and became a member of the Fairfax Gun Club. He was sent to the Republic of China in 1962, and then Japan the following year, before he was able to return to Virginia in 1965, but by 1968 he was back in Japan for a four-year stint. He next spent two years in the Panama Canal Zone before retiring from the CIA and the Air Force with the rank of Lieutenant colonel at the end of 1974 and soon moved to Wolfeboro, New Hampshire. From 1978 through 1983 he took up work as a shooting instructor and coach around New England and continued competing in tournaments through the 1990s. In 2011 he was the presenter of the Fulton Trophy, awarded by the National Rifle Association of America (NRA) to the highest individual scorer in the Palma Team Match. He was made a member of the Connecticut State Rifle and Revolver Association Shooters Hall of Fame in 1985 and the United States International Shooting Hall of Fame in 1999. The Arthur C. Jackson Trophy, awarded by the NRA to the highest scorer at the World Black Powder Long Range International Championships, is named in his honor. He died at the age of 96 on January 6, 2015, in Concord, New Hampshire.
