= Ludwig Gräf =

German sports shooter

Personal information
- Born: 25 August 1908 Homburg, Germany
- Died: 18 September 1978 (aged 70) Homburg, Germany

Sport
- Sport: Sports shooting

Ludwig Gräf (25 August 1908 – 18 September 1978) was a German sports shooter who competed for Saar in two events at the 1952 Summer Olympics.

== See also ==
- Saar at the 1952 Summer Olympics
