= Shmuel Laviv-Lubin =

Israeli sports shooter (1923–2012)

Personal information
- Native name: שמואל לביב-לובין
- Born: 13 July 1923 Rishon LeZion, Israel
- Died: 17 July 2012 (aged 89)

Sport
- Sport: Sports shooting

Shmuel Laviv-Lubin (Hebrew: שמואל לביב-לובין; 13 July 1923 – 17 July 2012) was an Israeli sports shooter. He competed in the 300 m rifle, three positions event at the 1952 Summer Olympics. Laviv-Lubin died on 17 July 2012, at the age of 89.
