= Eduardo López (fencer) =

Guatemalan fencer

Personal information
- Full name: Eduardo Carlos López Paniagua
- Born: 5 September 1926

Sport
- Sport: Fencing

Eduardo López (born 5 September 1926, date of death unknown) was a Guatemalan fencer. He competed in the individual foil, sabre and épée events at the 1952 Summer Olympics.
