= Francisco Sandoval =

Guatemalan sport shooter

Personal information
- Full name: Francisco Hermenegildo Sandoval Guzmán
- Born: 31 January 1924 Quezaltepeque, Guatemala

Sport
- Sport: Sports shooting

Francisco Sandoval (born 31 January 1924, date of death unknown) was a Guatemalan sports shooter. He competed at the 1952 Summer Olympics and 1968 Summer Olympics.
