= Aleksandr Dov =

Soviet-Israeli singer (born 1954)

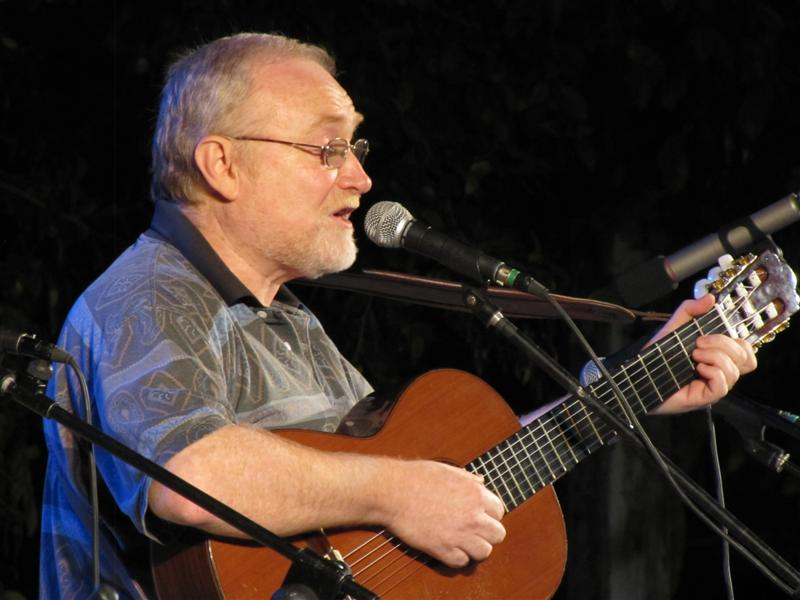
A. Dov, 2011

Aleksandr Dov (Hebrew: אלכסנדר דב) (Note: He selected his stage name Dov, because in means "bear", and "Medvedenko" is derived from the Russian word медведь, medved, also "bear"), birth name Aleksandr Arkadyevich Medvedenko, (Russian: Медведенко, Александр Аркадьевич; born October 26, 1954) is a Ukrainian Soviet and Israeli singer-songwriter and radio broadcaster with Israel Radio International (Kan REKA). He immigrated to Israel in 1990.

A. Dov condemned the Russian intervention in Ukraine and wrote a number of songs to this end ("Сто дней войны", "Ты выбор свой сделал", "Буча" ["One Hundred Days of War", "You Made Your Choice", "Bucha" (about Bucha, Ukraine) ], etc.).
