= Dov Albukrek =

Israeli physician (born 1966)

- דב אלבוקרק
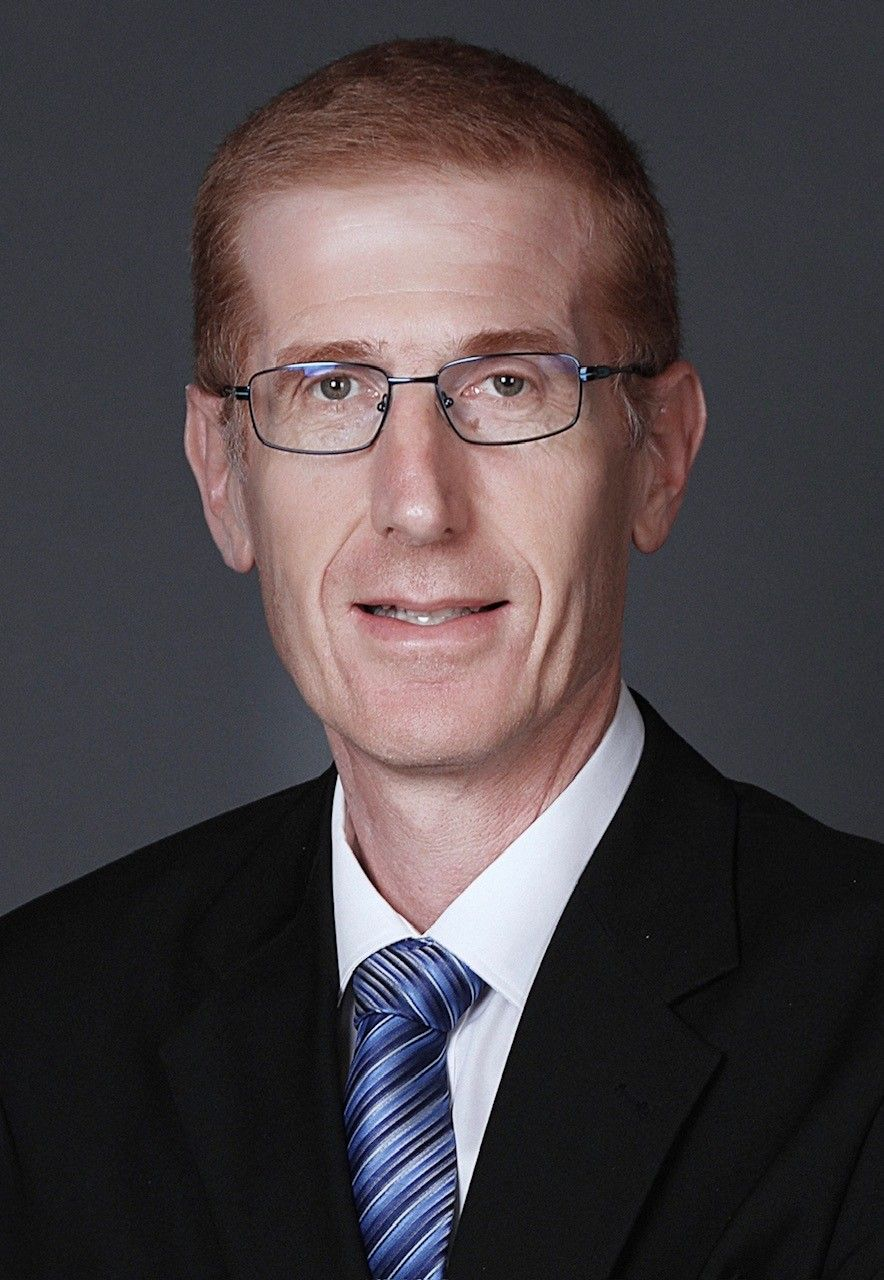
- Born: December 11, 1966 (age 59); Istanbul, Turkey
- Occupation: Doctor

Dov Albukrek (Hebrew: דב אלבוקרק; born December 11, 1966) is an Israeli physician who has served as Deputy CEO and Head of the Medical Division at Meuhedet Health Services since 2022. He is also a member of the Israeli Health Basket Committee. Previously, he served as the Director of the Reuth Medical Rehabilitation Center in Tel Aviv, Chief Medical Officer of the Central Command in the Israel Defense Forces (IDF) with the rank of Colonel, deputy director of Rabin Medical Center, and Medical Advisor to the Director-General of the Israeli Ministry of Health.

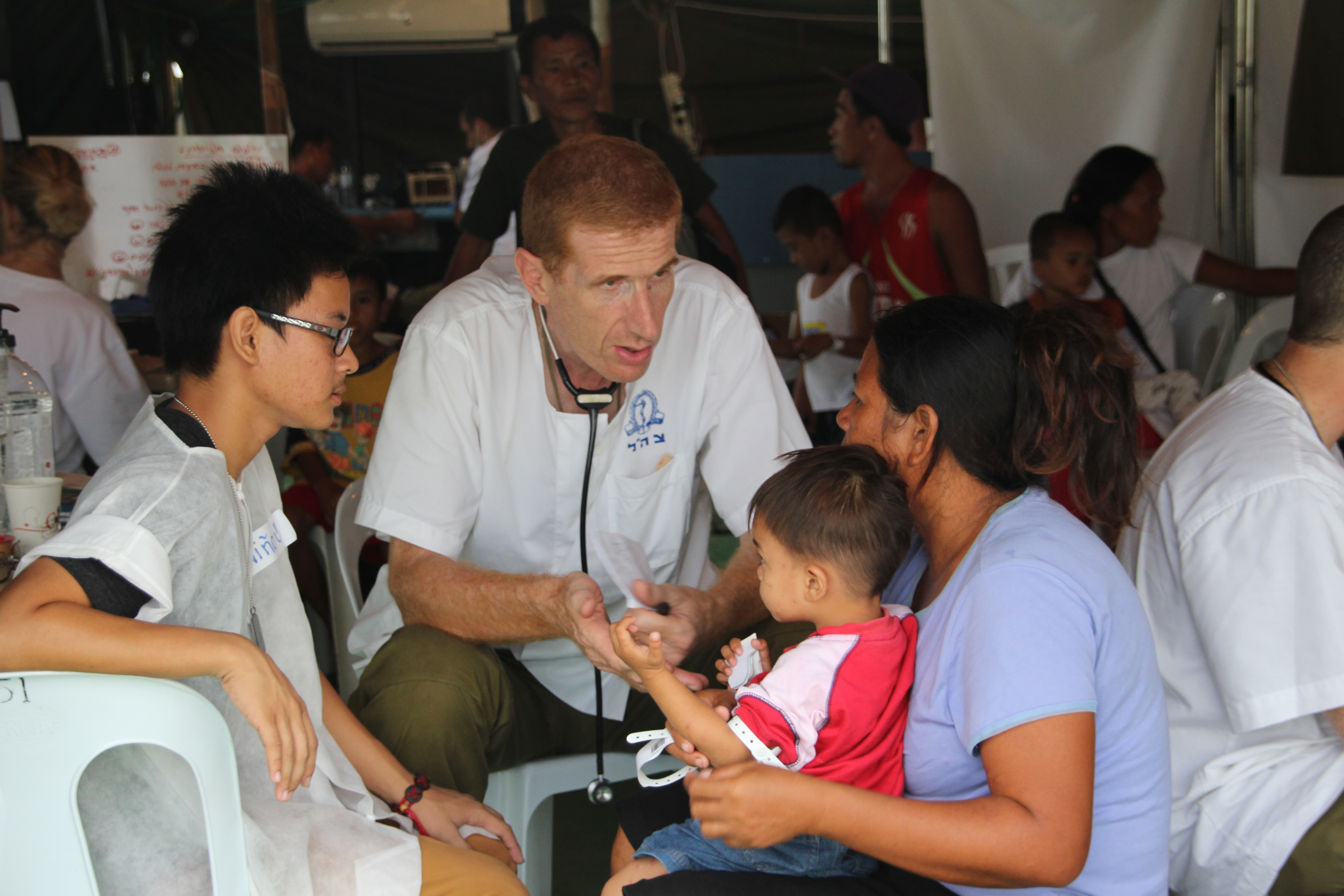
Philippines 2013

== Early life and education ==
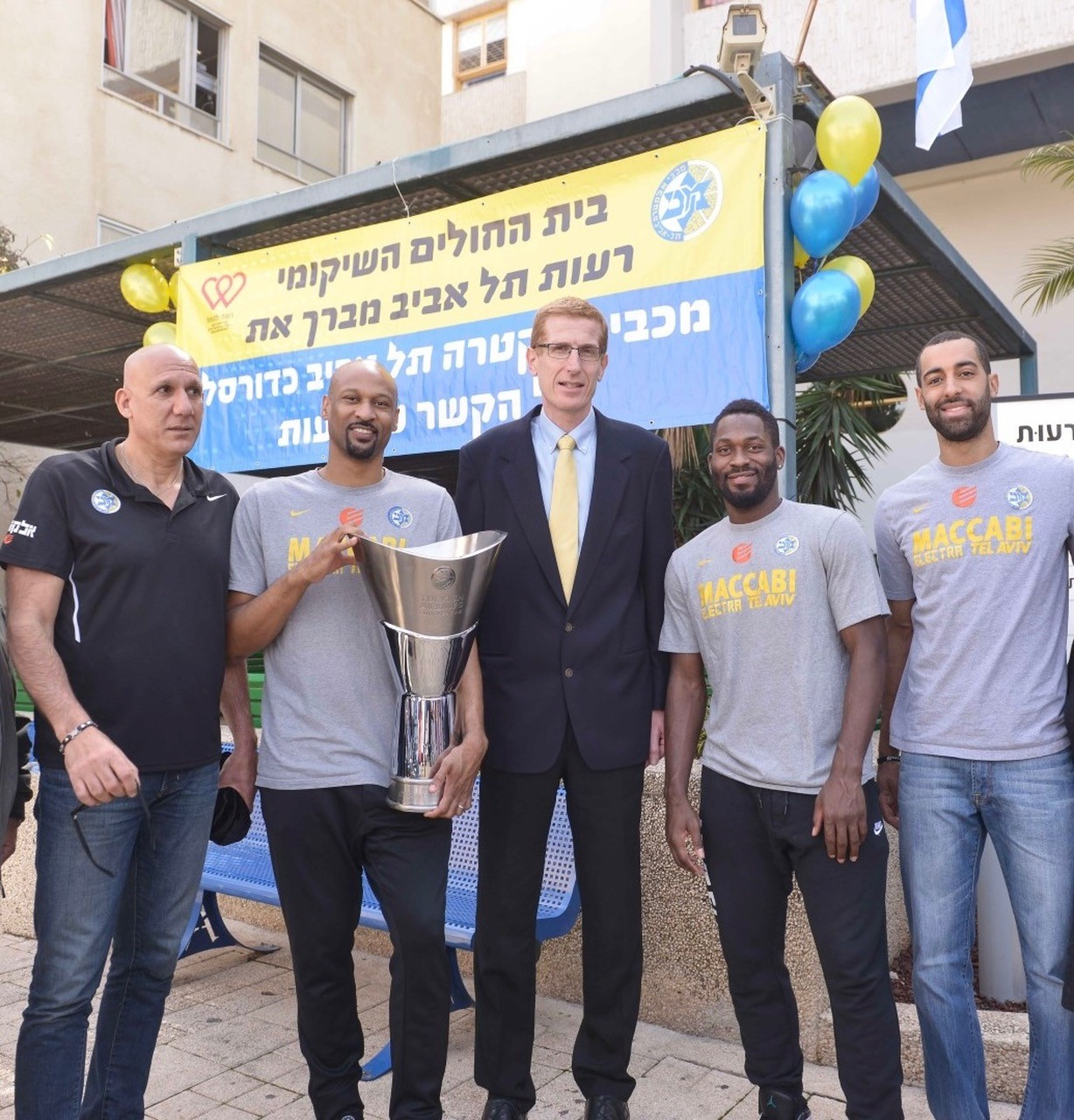
Maccabi Tel Aviv

Dov Albukrek was born in Istanbul, Turkey, to Moïse Albukrek, a family physician, and Suzy Albukrek, a medical secretary. He immigrated to Israel in 1970.

Between 1980 and 1984, during his high school years, Albukrek played basketball in the youth teams of Maccabi Tel Aviv.

In 1984, he began medical studies as part of the Academic Reserve Program at the Faculty of Medicine at Tel Aviv University. He completed his internship at the Assaf Harofeh Medical Center. From 2010 to 2011, he pursued a master's degree in Health Systems Management (MHA) at Ben-Gurion University of the Negev.

== Career ==
In 2003, Albukrek specialized in pediatrics at Schneider Children's Medical Center of Israel, where he later served as a senior pediatrician. He subsequently became deputy director of Beilinson Hospital and, in 2007, began subspecialty training in Medical Administration at Beilinson.

From 2013 to 2014, he served as Medical Advisor to the Director-General of the Ministry of Health, coordinating the regulation of the "Ofek" information-sharing project and leading initiatives in medical rehabilitation. He also chaired a committee to assess the deployment of bulletproof ambulances in the West Bank.

Between 2014 and 2020, Albukrek was the Director of Reuth Rehabilitation Hospital in Tel Aviv. Under his leadership, the hospital became affiliated with Tel Aviv University.

From 2020 to 2021, he was deputy director of Rabin Medical Center, chairing the hospital's Ethics Committee and the Organ Transplantation Committee.

Since January 2022, Albukrek has served as Deputy CEO and Head of the Medical Division at Meuhedet Health Services. In this role, he oversees the organization's core medical services.

== Military service ==
Albukrek served in the IDF Medical Corps, achieving the rank of Colonel. His roles included:

- 2004–2006: Divisional Medical Officer for the Judea and Samaria Division.
- 2007–2010: Head of the Medical Screening and Occupational Medicine Branch. He spearheaded the digitization of medical profiles and initiated data-sharing processes between health maintenance organizations (HMOs) and the IDF.
- 2010–2013: Command Medical Officer for the Central Command.

In 2013, Albukrek participated in the IDF's humanitarian mission to the Philippines following Typhoon Haiyan. He managed the pediatric department of the field hospital, treating approximately 850 children. He later co-authored a peer-reviewed account of pediatric field-hospital care during the response, published in the Emergency Medicine Journal in 2014.
