= Rafael Arnal =

Venezuelan sports shooter

Personal information
- Born: 9 May 1915 Caracas, Venezuela
- Died: 6 June 2011 (aged 96) Caracas, Venezuela

Sport
- Sport: Sports shooting

Rafael Arnal (9 May 1915 – 6 June 2011) was a Venezuelan sports shooter. He competed in two events at the 1952 Summer Olympics.
