= Antoine Shousha =

Egyptian sports shooter

Personal information
- Born: 4 March 1927
- Died: 18 December 2002 (aged 75)

Sport
- Sport: Sports shooting

Antoine Shousha (4 March 1927 – 18 December 2002) was an Egyptian sports shooter. He competed in three events at the 1952 Summer Olympics.
