= Souren Choudhury =

Indian sports shooter (born 1918)

Personal information
- Born: 25 July 1918

Sport
- Sport: Sports shooting
- Club: South Calcutta Rifle Club, Kolkata

Souren Choudhury (born 25 July 1918, date of death unknown) was an Indian sports shooter. He competed in the 50 m rifle, prone event at the 1952 Summer Olympics. Choudhury is deceased.
