= Dov Forman =

British author and social media creator (born 2003)

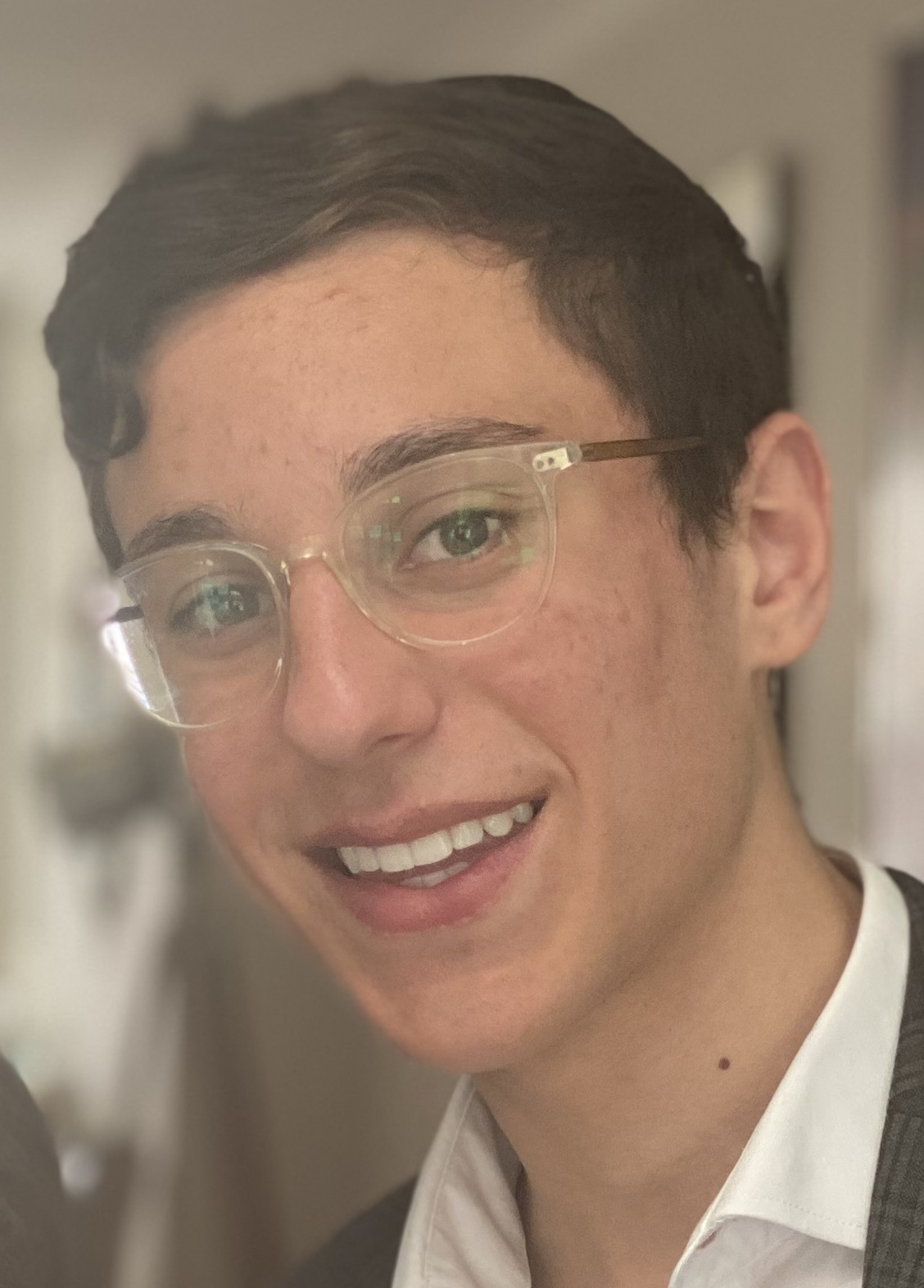
- Forman in 2021
- Born: London, England
- Known for: Lily's Promise: How I Survived Auschwitz and Found the Strength to Live published with Lily Ebert; Media appearances and social media videos
- Relatives: Lily Ebert (great-grandmother)

Dov Forman (born December 2003) is a British author and social media creator. His great-grandmother was Holocaust survivor Lily Ebert and from 2020 they began using social media to educate people about the Holocaust and Judaism, and to advocate against antisemitism, reaching over one billion views. He also co-authored Lily’s Promise, a book documenting Ebert's experience during the Holocaust.

== Early life ==
Born in London, Forman is a religious Jew of Ashkenazi descent. He is the youngest of three siblings, one of Holocaust survivor Lily Ebert's 38 great-grandchildren, and lives in northwest London.

As of 2025, Forman was studying Central and East European History and Jewish Studies at University College London.

== Career ==
=== Social media ===
Using Twitter, Forman found the name of a Jewish-American soldier who had helped his great-grandmother after she was liberated from a death march, and shared the story of how she survived. In February 2021, Forman started a TikTok account with Ebert to raise awareness about the Holocaust among younger generations, with videos of Ebert answering questions about the Holocaust and Judaism. The account also includes videos of Ebert's daily life. As of January 2022, Forman and Ebert had 1.6 million TikTok followers.

In 2025, Forman also worked for Conservative MP Robert Jenrick producing social media content.

=== Co-authorship ===
Forman and Ebert co-authored the memoir Lily's Promise published by Pan Macmillan in the UK on 2 September 2021 and by HarperCollins in the US on 10 May 2022. It became a New York Times bestseller.

=== Awards ===
- In November 2021, Forman received the Points of Light award for services to Holocaust education.
- In March 2022, Forman and Ebert were presented with the Jewish Care community award.
- In July 2025, Forman was included in the inaugural TIME100 Creators list.
- Also in 2025, Forman was selected for the inaugural Masa Changemakers List, honouring 18 global leaders from Masa's 200,000+ alumni. Forman was a Masa participant during his time in Israel as a Nitzavim Fellow, studying at the Hebrew University of Jerusalem and a Talmudic college in Jerusalem.
