= Boris Andreyev (shooter) =

Soviet sport shooter

Personal information
- Born: 21 January 1906 Moscow, Russian Empire
- Died: 9 March 1987 (aged 81)

Sport
- Sport: Shooting
- Club: Dynamo Moscow (1929–1932); Spartak Moscow (1940–1945); CSKA Moscow (1945–1956)
Medal record
Representing the Soviet Union
Olympic Games
Silver medal – second place	1952 Helsinki	Rifle prone
Bronze medal – third place	1952 Helsinki	Rifle three positions

Boris Vasilyevich Andreyev (Russian: Борис Васильевич Андреев; 21 January 1906 – 9 March 1987) was a Soviet shooter. He won a silver and a bronze medal at the 1952 Summer Olympics, aged 46, in the 50 metre rifle prone and 50 metre rifle three positions, respectively. In the former event, both he and Iosif Sîrbu broke the world record by executing 40 ideal 10-point shots, but Sîrbu outscored Andreyev 33:28 by the number of hits into the central area of the 10-point black circle.

Andreev won national titles in 1929, 1930, 1933, 1946–1948 and 1951–1953. He graduated from a military academy of chemical defense and held a rank of lieutenant colonel. He was awarded the Order of Lenin, Order of the Red Banner and Order of the Red Star.
