= Juan Bizama =

Chilean sports shooter

Personal information
- Full name: Juan Bizama Leyton
- Born: 15 August 1908 (age 117)

Sport
- Sport: Sports shooting

Juan Bizama (born 15 August 1908, date of death unknown) was a Chilean sports shooter. He competed in two events at the 1952 Summer Olympics.
