= Pyotr Avilov =

Soviet sports shooter

Personal information
- Full name: Pyotr Semyonovich Avilov
- Born: 10 June 1910 Lebedi village, Starooskolsky District, Kursk Governorate, Russian Empire
- Died: 2004 (aged 93–94)

Sport
- Sport: Shooting sports

Pyotr Semyonovich Avilov (Russian: Пётр Семёнович Авилов; 10 June 1910 – 2004) was a Soviet sports shooter. He competed in two events at the 1952 Summer Olympics, 50 m rifle prone and 50 m rifle three positions.

His granddaughter, Natalya, was the wife of Boris Kokorev, another sports shooter.
