= Luís Howorth =

Portuguese sports shooter

Personal information
- Born: 11 March 1909 Lisbon, Portugal
- Died: 10 February 1977 (aged 67) Santa Maria de Belém, Portugal

Sport
- Sport: Sports shooting

Luís Howorth (11 March 1909 – 10 February 1977) was a Portuguese sports shooter. He competed in two events at the 1952 Summer Olympics.
