= Charles Hyde (sport shooter) =

British sports shooter

Personal information
- Born: 29 November 1904 Farnham, Surrey, England
- Died: 29 November 1982 (aged 78) Salisbury, Wiltshire, England

Sport
- Sport: Sports shooting

Charles Hyde (29 November 1904 – 11 November 1982) was a British sports shooter. He competed in two events at the 1952 Summer Olympics.
