= Arieh Batun-Kleinstub =

Israeli high jumper (born 1933)

Arieh Batun-Kleinstub אריה קלינשטוב-נווה
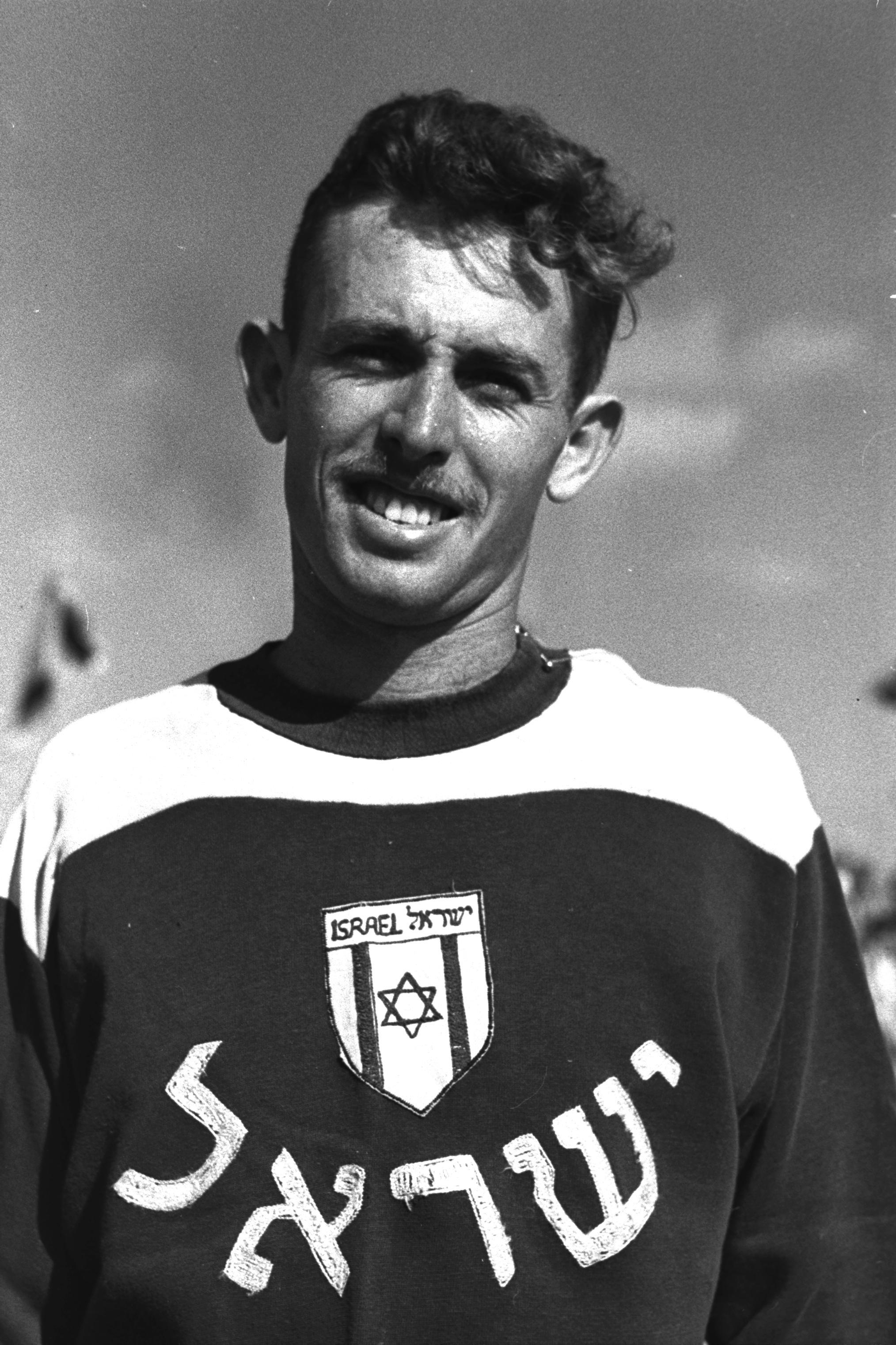

Personal information
- Nationality: Israeli
- Born: 26 January 1933 (age 93)

Sport
- Sport: Track and field
- Event: High jump

Achievements and titles
- Personal best: High jump - 1.88 m

Arieh Batun-Kleinstub (also "-Naveh"; Hebrew: אריה קלינשטוב-נווה; born 26 January 1933) is an Israeli former Olympic high jumper.

== High jump career ==
He competed for Israel at the 1952 Summer Olympics in Helsinki, at the age of 19. He came in 35th in the Men's High Jump with a jump of 1.70 metres.

His personal best in the high jump was 1.88 metres in 1953.

He competed for Israel and won gold medals in both the 1953 Maccabiah Games and the 1957 Maccabiah Games in the high jump.
