= José Gómez (sport shooter) =

Guatemalan sports shooter

Personal information
- Born: José Ángel Gómez Paz; 14 September 1916 Guatemala City, Guatemala
- Died: 20 February 2005 (aged 88) Guatemala City, Guatemala

Sport
- Sport: Sports shooting

José Gómez (14 September 1916 – 20 February 2005) was a Guatemalan sports shooter. He competed at the 1952 Summer Olympics, finishing 30th in Men's 50 metre rifle, prone, and 32nd in Men's 25 metre rapid fire pistol.
