= Dov Carmel =

Israeli composer and music arranger (1932–2024)

Dov Carmel (1932–2024) was an Israeli composer and arranger, who began producing compositions during the 1960s.

== Life and career ==
Carmel was born in Budapest in 1932. His education began with Ilona Feher whom he studied violin with at the age of nine. His studies were interrupted by the Holocaust between 1944 and 1945, but he was able to resume them afterwards. He won a competition in Debrecen for young musicians.

Later, his parents moved to Kibbutz Dalia in Israel. A Youth Aliyah scholarship enabled him to continue his studies in the vicinity of Haifa. Living here he continued with studies at the Music Institute of Oranim Teachers' College under the direction of professors Abel Ehrlich and Yizhak Sadai.

Between 1954 and 1971 he taught at schools in Israel, including 1971-1992 at Oranim. He won the ACUM Prize in 1969 for orchestral composition and the Kibbutz Movement Competition Prize in 1972.

Carmel began composing music during his thirties, with a debut performance in Tel Aviv. He died in 2024.

== See also ==
- Counterpoint
- Orchestration
- Ear training
