= Paul Konsler =

French sports shooter

Personal information
- Born: 15 January 1913 Nancy, France
- Died: 21 September 2007 (aged 94) Nancy, France

Sport
- Sport: Sports shooting

Paul Konsler (15 January 1913 – 21 September 2007) was a French sports shooter. He competed in two events at the 1952 Summer Olympics in Helsinki.
