= Zlatko Mašek =

Yugoslav sports shooter

Personal information
- Born: 31 October 1928
- Died: 20 September 1993 (aged 64)

Sport
- Sport: Sports shooting

Zlatko Mašek (31 October 1928 – 20 September 1993) was a Yugoslav sports shooter. He competed at the 1952 Summer Olympics and 1956 Summer Olympics.
