= Zvi Pinkas =

Israeli sports shooter

Personal information
- Native name: צבי פנקס
- Born: 1 September 1910

Sport
- Sport: Sports shooting

Zvi Pinkas (Hebrew: צבי פנקס; born 1 September 1910, date of death unknown) was an Israeli sports shooter. He competed in two events at the 1952 Summer Olympics.
