= Alexander Eliraz =

Israeli sports shooter

Alexander Eliraz אלכס אלירז
Personal information
- Born: 14 October 1914 Ukraine
- Died: 16 January 2004 (aged 89) Israel

Sport
- Country: Israel
- Sport: Sports shooting

Alexander Eliraz (Hebrew: אלכס אלירז; 14 October 1914 – 16 January 2004) was an Israeli sports shooter. He competed in two events for Israel at the 1952 Summer Olympics.
