= Harvey Dias Villela =

Brazilian sports shooter

Personal information
- Born: 5 August 1898 Rio de Janeiro, Brazil
- Died: 1974 (aged 75–76) Rio de Janeiro, Brazil

Sport
- Sport: Sports shooting

Harvey Dias Villela (5 August 1898 – 1974) was a Brazilian sports shooter. He competed at the 1936 Summer Olympics and 1952 Summer Olympics.
