= Severino Moreira =

Brazilian sports shooter

Personal information
- Born: 29 September 1913 São Paulo, Brazil

Sport
- Sport: Sports shooting

Severino Moreira (born 29 September 1913, date of death unknown) was a Brazilian sports shooter. He competed at the 1952 Summer Olympics and 1956 Summer Olympics.
