= Humberto Briceño =

Venezuelan sports shooter (born 1928)

Personal information
- Full name: Humberto Segundo Briceño Martínez
- Born: 1 June 1928

Sport
- Sport: Sports shooting

Humberto Briceño (born 1 June 1928) is a Venezuelan former sports shooter. He competed in three events at the 1952 Summer Olympics.

Briceño is the brother of fellow Venezuelan shooter Germán Briceño.
