= Wilhelm Sachsenmaier =

Austrian sports shooter (1927–2017)

Personal information
- Born: 24 February 1927 Kufstein, Austria
- Died: 14 April 2017 (aged 90)

Sport
- Sport: Sports shooting

Wilhelm Sachsenmaier (24 February 1927 – 14 April 2017) was an Austrian sports shooter. He competed at the 1952 Summer Olympics and 1960 Summer Olympics. He also was a biochemist, a cancer researcher, and a professor at the University of Innsbruck from 1970 until his retirement.
