= Alfredo Mury =

Guatemalan sports shooter (1908–1997)

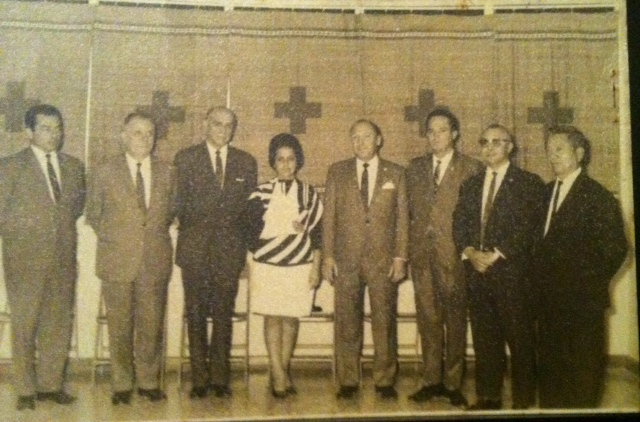
- Alfredo Mury (second from left to right)

Personal information
- Full name: Alfredo Charles Mury Benz
- Born: 3 December 1908 Bex, Switzerland
- Died: 14 July 1997 (aged 88) Guatemala City, Guatemala

Sport
- Sport: Sports shooting

Alfredo Mury (3 December 1908 – 14 July 1997) was a Guatemalan sports shooter. He competed in two events at the 1952 Summer Olympics.
