= János Dosztály =

Hungarian sport shooter

Personal information
- Born: 18 February 1920 Kóka, Hungary
- Died: 22 March 1998 (aged 78)

Sport
- Sport: Sports shooting

János Dosztály (18 February 1920 – 22 March 1998) was a Hungarian sports shooter. He competed at the 1952 Summer Olympics and 1960 Summer Olympics.
