= Dov Ben-Dov =

Israeli sports shooter (1927–2020)

Personal information
- Born: דב בן דב; 2 March 1927 Jerusalem, Palestine Mandate
- Died: 10 April 2020 (aged 93)

Sport
- Country: Israel
- Sport: Sports shooting
Medal record
Men's shooting
Representing Israel
Asian Games
Bronze medal – third place	1954 Manila	300 m rifle 3 positions

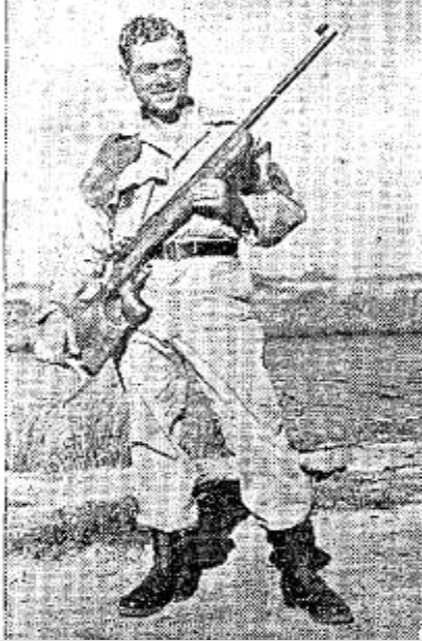
Ben-Dov in 1954

Dov Ben-Dov (Hebrew: דב בן דב; 2 March 1927 – April 2020) was an Israeli sports shooter. He competed in the 300 m rifle, three positions event for Israel at the 1952 Summer Olympics.

== Biography ==
Dov Ben-Dov was born in 1927 in the Bukharan neighborhood of Jerusalem to Zvi Ben-Dov (formerly Anshilovsky) and his wife, who were immigrants from Poland. He trained at the "Tir" shooting club, which operated on the beach Tel Aviv.

Ben-Dov joined the Haganah before the establishment of the State of Israel and in 1948, after Israel declared its independence, he enlisted in the Israel Defense Forces (IDF) and participated in the first sniper course in the IDF, continuing his military service as a sniper instructor.

In 1952 he was part of the Israeli delegation to the Helsinki Olympics in 1952. He competed in the 300 meter freestyle, scoring 1,033 points, and finishing 21st out of 32.

In 1954, he was a member of the Israeli delegation to the Asian Games and came in third place in the 300-meter freestyle, and in fourth place in the three-position rifle shooting. Later that year he won the Israeli shooting championship.

In 1957 he competed in the Fifth Maccabiah Games in the three-meter freestyle 300 meters and won a bronze medal. In 1958 he was part of the Israeli delegation to the World Shooting Championships held in Moscow. Ben-Dov competed as a member of Maccabi Ramat Gan.

In 1960 he was selected to participate in the Israeli delegation to the Rome Olympics, but later his participation was canceled. In August 1960, he won second place in the Israeli championship, and retired from competitive activity. He returned to competition in 1967 as a member of Maccabi Ramat Gan.

Ben-Dov was married and had three children. He died on 10 April 2020.
