= Vilho Ylönen =

Finnish cross-country skier and rifle shooter (1918–2000)

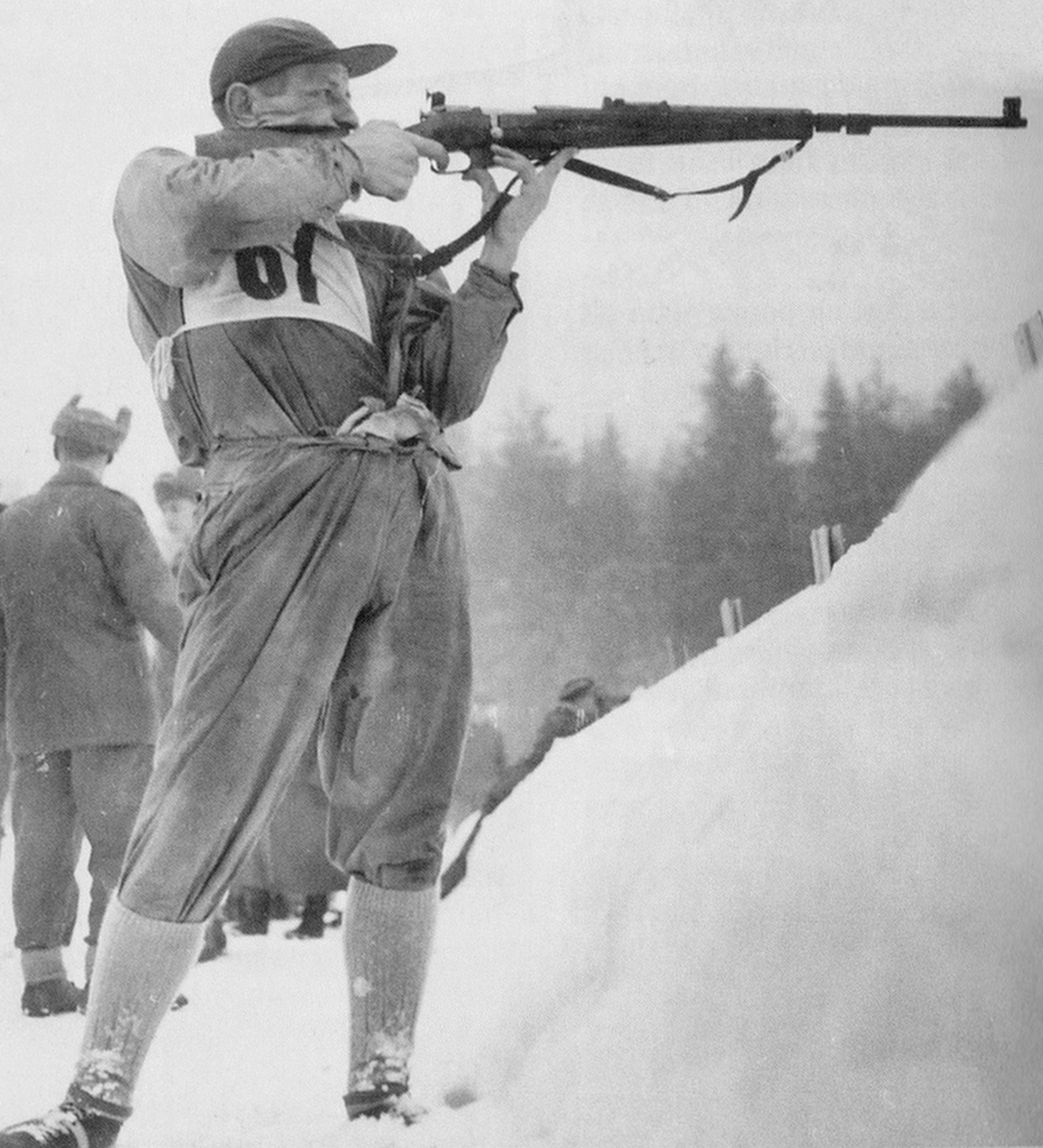

Personal information
- Full name: Vilho Ilmari Ylönen
- Born: 31 May 1918 Hankasalmi, Finland
- Died: 8 March 2000 (aged 81) Konnevesi, Finland
- Height: 169 cm (5 ft 7 in)
- Weight: 67 kg (148 lb)

Sport
- Sport: Shooting
Medal record
Representing Finland
Olympic Games
Silver medal – second place	1952 Helsinki	50 metre rifle three positions
Bronze medal – third place	1956 Melbourne	300 m rifle three positions

Vilho Ilmari Ylönen (31 May 1918 – 8 March 2000) was a Finnish cross-country skier and rifle shooter who competed in the 1948, 1952, 1956, 1960 and 1964 Winter Olympics.

Ylönen was a career military officer serving as a non-commissioned officer at the Finnish Air Force base in Tikkakoski; at the time of 1948 Winter Olympics held the rank of kersantti (sergeant). He was a member of the Finnish team that placed second in the military patrol demonstration event (precursor to biathlon). In other Olympics he competed in several rifle events and had best results in the 50 m small-bore rifle three positions and 300 m free rifle three positions. In the former event he won a silver medal in 1952 and finished fifth in 1956, while in the latter discipline he won a bronze medal in 1956 and placed fourth in 1960.

Ylönen won 14 medals at the world championships in the 1950s, including four gold medals. At the European Championships, he collected one gold, six silver and two bronze medals. Ylönen was also a three-time Nordic champion and 44 times national champion. In 1958 he was voted as Finnish Sportspersonality of the year.

After retiring from the military service, Ylönen worked as a factory representative for the Tikkakoski Arms Factory.
