= Iosif Sîrbu =

Romanian sport shooter

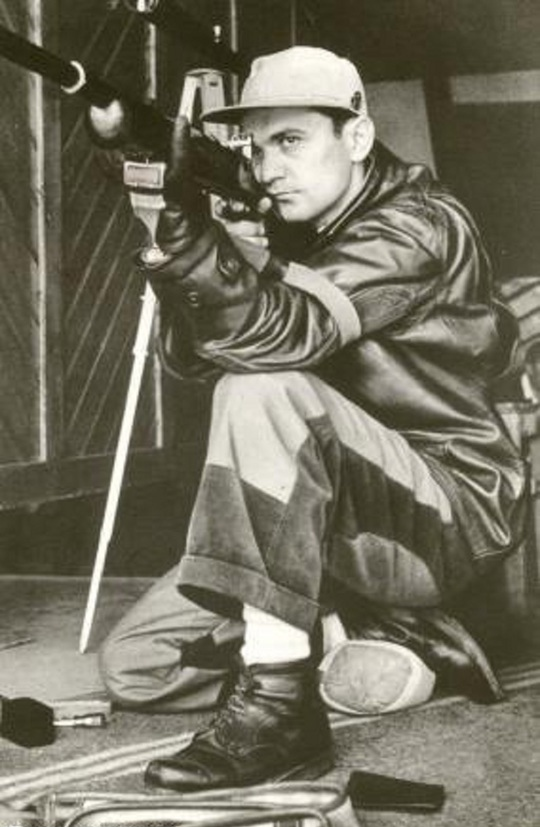
- Sîrbu, c. 1950s-60s

Personal information
- Born: 21 September 1925 Șibot, Kingdom of Romania
- Died: 6 September 1964 (aged 38) Bucharest, Romanian People's Republic
- Height: 179 cm (5 ft 10 in)
- Weight: 79 kg (174 lb)

Sport
- Sport: Sport shooting
- Event: 50 m rifle
- Club: CSA Steaua București
Medal record
Representing Romania
Olympic Games
Gold medal – first place	1952 Helsinki	50 m rifle prone

Iosif Sârbu (25 September 1925 – c. 6 September 1964) was a Romanian sport shooter and Romania’s first ever Olympic champion. He competed in six 50 m rifle events in total at the 1952, 1956, and 1960 Olympics and won a gold medal in the 50 m rifle prone in 1952, setting a world record. He served as the flag bearer for Romania at the 1956 Olympics.

== Sporting career ==
He was born in Șibot, Alba County, Romania. His family moved to the Romanian capital of Bucharest when Iosif was 7 years old. His father, Dănilă Sârbu, soon got a job at the Tunari Sports Shooting Range, whose manager he became just after World War II. This provided an opportunity for young Iosif to take up sports shooting in 1937, at the age of 12. He won his first national level competition (Bucharest Cup) in 1939.

In the first national championship after the war (1946) he became Romanian champion in the free rifle, standing event, scoring 358 points. His first international victory came in the Balkan championships in Belgrade (1948) where he won the free rifle, prone event. At the 1952 Olympics he won the small-bore rifle 50 metres, prone event, setting a new world record at 400 points. This means he scored a maximum 10 points at every shot (there were 40 shots in total). The same was achieved by Soviet Boris Andreyev. However, according to the regulations in force at the time, Sârbu was awarded the gold medal, on grounds of his hitting the very center of the target 33 times, compared to Andreyev’s 28. The very center is in fact a small dot inside the 10-point area. Sârbu thus became Romania’s first Olympic champion in history, regardless of discipline.

Despite his declining eyesight, Iosif Sârbu took part in another two Olympics, finishing 5th in Melbourne, 1956 and 12th in Rome, 1960. On 6 September 1964 he was found dead in his Bucharest home. The circumstances of his death were never officially explained or confirmed, but it is widely believed that he committed suicide, after a medical verdict not only denied him participation in the 1964 Olympic games in Tokyo, but stated he would never be able to compete again, because of his eye condition. He was buried in Bucharest's Ghencea Cemetery.
