= Shooting at the 1952 Summer Olympics =

Shooting at the Games of the XV Olympiad
- Dates: 25-29 July 1952

With the competitions in shooting at the 1952 Summer Olympics in Helsinki, the Olympic shooting program began its expansion. Three new events were added: 100 metre running deer, 50 metre rifle three positions and trap. In total there were seven events held between 25 and 29 July 1952. No women participated in the 1952 shooting events. This was the first year that a new format was introduced as well: the sights on the guns were now located on the left side of the barrel.

== Medal summary ==
| Event | Gold | | Silver | | Bronze | |
|---|---|---|---|---|---|---|
| rapid fire pistol | Károly Takács; Hungary | 579 | Szilárd Kun; Hungary | 578 | Gheorghe Lichiardopol; Romania | 578 |
| pistol | Huelet Benner; United States | 553 | Angel Leon de Gozalo; Spain | 550 | Ambrus Balogh; Hungary | 549 |
| rifle prone | Iosif Sîrbu; Romania | 400 | Boris Andreyev; Soviet Union | 400 | Arthur Jackson; United States | 399 |
| rifle three positions | Erling Asbjørn Kongshaug; Norway | 1164 | Vilho Ylönen; Finland | 1164 | Boris Andreyev; Soviet Union | 1163 |
| running deer (single and double shot) | John Larsen; Norway | 413 | Per Olof Sköldberg; Sweden | 409 | Tauno Mäki; Finland | 407 |
| 300 metre rifle three positions | Anatoli Bogdanov; Soviet Union | 1123 | Robert Bürchler; Switzerland | 1120 | Lev Weinstein; Soviet Union | 1109 |
| trap | George Genereux; Canada | 192 | Knut Holmqvist; Sweden | 191 | Hans Liljedahl; Sweden | 190 |

Károly Takács stunned the world after winning the 25-metre rapid fire pistol event. In 1940, he was known as the most skilled shooter in the Hungarian armed forces and was thought to be a favorite in the event. Unfortunately, Takács lost a portion of his hand in an accident involving a hand grenade during an operation simulation. Despite his full recovery, he was no longer able to shoot with his dominant hand. Takács trained for 12 years, making his weak hand shooting ability as skilled as his dominant hand once was. Eventually, he went on to win gold in this sport, shocking the world in the process and motivating people around the world to overcome adversity.

== Participating nations ==
A total of 218 shooters from 41 nations competed at the Helsinki Games:

- Argentina (7)
- Austria (3)
- Belgium (4)
- Brazil (8)
- Bulgaria (6)
- Canada (4)
- Chile (2)
- Cuba (2)
- Czechoslovakia (6)
- Denmark (5)
- Egypt (6)
- Finland (11)
- France (9)
- Germany (6)
- Great Britain (12)
- Greece (6)
- Guatemala (3)
- Hungary (6)
- India (2)
- Israel (4)
- Italy (8)
- Japan (1)
- Lebanon (3)
- Mexico (4)
- Monaco (6)
- Norway (9)
- Pakistan (1)
- Philippines (3)
- Poland (2)
- Portugal (4)
- Puerto Rico (5)
- Romania (4)
- Saar (2)
- South Africa (1)
- Soviet Union (11)
- Spain (4)
- Sweden (10)
- Switzerland (9)
- United States (6)
- Venezuela (7)
- Yugoslavia (6)

== Medal table ==
| Rank | Nation | Gold | Silver | Bronze | Total |
|---|---|---|---|---|---|
| 1 | Norway | 2 | 0 | 0 | 2 |
| 2 | Soviet Union | 1 | 1 | 2 | 4 |
| 3 | Hungary | 1 | 1 | 1 | 3 |
| 4 | Romania | 1 | 0 | 1 | 2 |
| 4 | United States | 1 | 0 | 1 | 2 |
| 6 | Canada | 1 | 0 | 0 | 1 |
| 7 | Sweden | 0 | 2 | 1 | 3 |
| 8 | Finland | 0 | 1 | 1 | 2 |
| 9 | Spain | 0 | 1 | 0 | 1 |
| 9 | Switzerland | 0 | 1 | 0 | 1 |
| Totals (10 entries) | | 7 | 7 | 7 | 21 |
