= Water polo at the 1968 Summer Olympics – Men's team squads =

The following is the list of squads that took part in the men's water polo tournament at the 1968 Summer Olympics.

== Brazil ==
The following players represented Brazil:

- Ivo Carotini
- Marc de Vicoso
- Henrique Filellini
- João Gonçalves Filho
- Cláudio Lima
- Aluísio Marsili
- Arnaldo Marsili
- Pedro Pinciroli Júnior
- Alvaro Pires
- Fernando Sandoval

== Cuba ==
The following players represented Cuba:

- Oscar Periche
- Waldimiro Arcos
- Miguel García
- Rolando Valdés
- Rubén Junco
- Guillermo Martínez Ginoris
- Chepe Rodríguez
- Osvaldo García
- Roberto Rodríguez
- Guillermo Cañete
- Jesús Pérez

== East Germany ==
The following players represented East Germany:

- Hans-Georg Fehn
- Klaus Schlenkrich
- Jürgen Thiel
- Siegfried Ballerstedt
- Peter Rund
- Hans-Jürgen Schüler
- Jürgen Kluge
- Veit Herrmanns
- Manfred Herzog
- Hans-Ulrich Lange
- Peter Schmidt

== Egypt ==
The following players represented Egypt:

- Mohamed Abid Soliman
- Salah El-Din Shalabi
- Mohamed El-Bassiouni
- Sameh Soliman
- Galal Touny
- Adel El-Moalem
- Alaa El-Din El-Shafei
- Khaled El-Kashef
- Hossam El-Baroudi
- Haroun Touny
- Ashraf Gamil

== Greece ==
The following players represented Greece:

- Ioannis Thymaras
- Georgios Theodorakopoulos
- Kyriakos Iosifidis
- Andreas Garyfallos
- Dimitrios Kougevetopoulos
- Panagiotis Mathioudakis
- Ioannis Palios
- Georgios Palikaris
- Nikolaos Tsangas
- Thomas Karalogos
- Panagiotis Mikhalos

== Hungary ==
The following players represented Hungary:

- Endre Molnár
- Mihály Mayer
- István Szivós Jr.
- János Konrád
- László Sárosi
- László Felkai
- Ferenc Konrád
- Dénes Pócsik
- András Bodnár
- Zoltán Dömötör
- János Steinmetz

== Italy ==
The following players represented Italy:

- Alberto Alberani Samaritani
- Eraldo Pizzo
- Mario Cevasco
- Gianni Lonzi
- Enzo Barlocco
- Franco Lavoratori
- Gianni De Magistris
- Alessandro Ghibellini
- Giancarlo Guerrini
- Paolo Ferrando
- Eugenio Merello

== Japan ==
The following players represented Japan:

- Tetsunosuke Ishii
- Hirokatsu Kuwayama
- Koji Nakano
- Shuzo Yajima
- Shigeharu Kuwabara
- Haruo Sato
- Kazuya Takeuchi
- Kunio Yonehara
- Seiya Sakamoto

== Mexico ==
The following players represented Mexico:

- Oscar Familiar
- Rolando Chávez
- Francisco García
- Germán Chávez
- Carlos Morfín
- Luis Guzmán
- Virgilio Botella
- Juan Manuel García
- José Luis Vásquez
- Sergio Ramos
- Daniel Gómez

== Netherlands ==
The following players represented the Netherlands:

- Feike de Vries
- Hans Wouda
- Loet Geutjes
- Hans Hoogveld
- Fred van Dorp
- Hans Parrel
- Nico van der Voet
- Ad Moolhuijzen
- Bart Bongers
- André Hermsen
- Evert Kroon

== Soviet Union ==
The following players represented the Soviet Union:

- Vadim Gulyayev
- Givi Chikvanaia
- Boris Grishin
- Aleksandr Dolgushin
- Oleksiy Barkalov
- Yury Grigorovsky
- Vladimir Semyonov
- Aleksandr Shidlovsky
- Vyacheslav Skok
- Leonid Osipov
- Oleg Bovin

== Spain ==
The following players represented Spain:

- Luis Bestit
- Jorge Borell
- Juan Rubio
- José Padrós
- Agustín Codera
- Fermín Más
- Lolo Ibern
- Santiago Zubicoa
- Luis Meya
- Juan Jané
- Vicente Brugat

== United States ==
The following players represented the United States:

- Tony van Dorp
- Dave Ashleigh
- Russ Webb
- Ron Crawford
- Stan Cole
- Bruce Bradley
- Dean Willeford
- Barry Weitzenberg
- Gary Sheerer
- John Parker
- Steve Barnett

== West Germany ==
The following players represented West Germany:

- Hans Hoffmeister
- Hermann Haverkamp
- Peter Teicher
- Lajos Nagy
- Wolf-Rüdiger Schulz
- Ludger Weeke
- Dietmar Seiz
- Kurt Schuhmann
- Heinz Kleimeier
- Ludwig Ott
- Günter Kilian

== Yugoslavia ==
The following players represented Yugoslavia:

- Ivo Trumbić
- Karlo Stipanić
- Ozren Bonačić
- Zoran Janković
- Uroš Marović
- Ronald Lopatni
- Miroslav Poljak
- Dejan Dabović
- Đorđe Perišić
- Mirko Sandić
- Zdravko Hebel
