= East Germany at the 1968 Summer Olympics =

- Flag of Germany superimposed with the Olympic rings
- IOC code: GDR (ODE used at these Games)
- NOC: National Olympic Committee of the German Democratic Republic

in Mexico City, Mexico 12–27 October 1968
- Competitors: 226 in 18 sports
- Flag bearer: Karin Balzer
- Medals Ranked 5th: Gold 9 Silver 9 Bronze 7 Total 25

Summer Olympics appearances (overview)
- 1968; 1972; 1976; 1980; 1984; 1988

Other related appearances
- Germany (1896–1936, 1992–pres.); United Team of Germany (1956–1964)

Athletes from East Germany (German Democratic Republic) competed at the 1968 Summer Olympics in Mexico City, Mexico. 226 competitors, 186 men and 40 women, took part in 124 events in 18 sports. It was the first time that West Germany (Federal Republic of Germany) and East Germany had sent separate teams to the Summer Olympic Games.

== Medalists ==
=== Gold ===
- Christoph Höhne — Athletics, Men's 50 km Walk
- Margitta Gummel — Athletics, Women's Shot Put
- Manfred Wolke — Boxing, Men's Welterweight
- Heinz-Jürgen Bothe and Jörg Lucke — Rowing, Men's Coxless Pairs
- Dieter Schubert, Frank Forberger, Dieter Grahn, and Frank Rühle — Rowing, Men's Coxless Fours
- Roland Matthes — Swimming, Men's 100m Backstroke
- Roland Matthes — Swimming, Men's 200m Backstroke
- Rudolf Vesper — Wrestling, Men's Greco-Roman Welterweight
- Lothar Metz — Wrestling, Men's Greco-Roman Middleweight

=== Silver ===
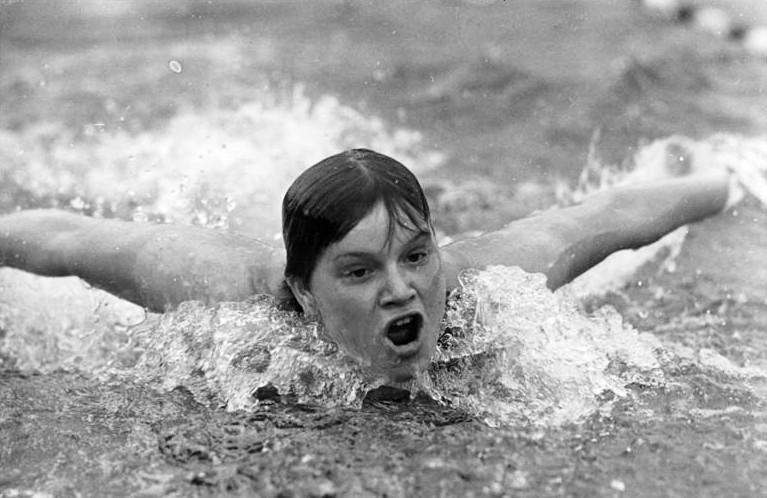
Helga Lindner, silver medallist in the women's 200m butterfly

- Klaus Beer — Athletics, Men's Long Jump
- Lothar Milde — Athletics, Men's Discus Throw
- Marita Lange — Athletics, Women's Shot Put
- Erika Zuchold — Gymnastics, Women's Side Horse Vault
- Karin Janz — Gymnastics, Women's Asymmetrical Bars
- Peter Kremtz, Dieter Semetzky, Manfred Gelpke, Roland Göhler and Klaus Jacob — Rowing, Men's Coxed Fours
- Frank Wiegand, Horst-Günter Gregor, Egon Henninger, and Roland Matthes — Swimming, Men's 4 × 100 m Medley Relay
- Helga Lindner — Swimming, Women's 200m Butterfly
- Gabriele Wetzko, Gabriele Perthes, Roswitha Krause, and Uta Schmuck — Swimming, Women's 4 × 100 m Freestyle Relay

=== Bronze ===
- Wolfgang Nordwig — Athletics, Men's Pole Vault
- Siegfried Fülle, Klaus Köste, Peter Weber, Günter Beier, Matthias Brehme, and Gerhard Dietrich — Gymnastics, Men's Team Combined Exercises
- Magdalena Schmidt, Ute Starke, Erika Zuchold, Maritta Bauerschmidt, Karin Janz, and Marianne Noack — Gymnastics, Women's Team Combined Exercises
- Harald Vollmar — Shooting, Men's Free Pistol
- Kurt Czekalla — Shooting, Men's Trap Shooting
- Sabine Steinbach — Swimming, Women's 400m Individual Medley
- Paul Borowski, Karl-Heinz Thun, and Konrad Weichert — Sailing, Men's Dragon

== Cycling ==
Ten cyclists represented East Germany in 1968.

Team time trial

- Klaus Ampler
- Günter Hoffmann
- Dieter Grabe
- Axel Peschel

1000m time trial

- Heinz Richter

Tandem

- Werner Otto
- Jürgen Geschke

Team pursuit

- Heinz Richter
- Wolfgang Schmelzer
- Rudolf Franz
- Manfred Ulbricht

== Diving ==
Men

Athlete	Event	Preliminary		Final			
Athlete	Event	Points	Rank	Points	Rank	Total	Rank
Lothar Matthes	10 m platform	92.19	7 Q	49.56	6	141.75	6
Rolf Sperling	10 m platform	85.51	20	Did not advance			

Women

Athlete	Event	Preliminary		Final			
Athlete	Event	Points	Rank	Points	Rank	Total	Rank
Ingrid Gulbin-Krämer	3 m springboard	90.56	6 Q	45.26	4	135.82	5
Sylvia Fiedler	10 m platform	43.35	19	Did not advance			
Claudia Reiche	10 m platform	41.02	23	Did not advance			

== Fencing ==
Four fencers, all men, represented East Germany in 1968.

Men's épée

- Hans-Peter Schulze
- Klaus Dumke
- Harry Fiedler

Men's team épée

- Bernd Uhlig, Klaus Dumke, Harry Fiedler, Hans-Peter Schulze

== Field hockey ==
Fourteen male field hockey players competed in 1968, when the East German team finished in 11th place.

- Rainer Stephan
- Axel Thieme
- Eckhard Wallossek
- Klaus Bahner
- Horst Brennecke
- Dieter Klauß
- Lothar Lippert
- Dieter Ehrlich
- Karlheinz Freiberger
- Reinhart Sasse
- Hans-Dietrich Sasse
- Rolf Thieme
- Klaus Träumer
- Helmut Rabis

== Modern pentathlon ==
Three male pentathlete represented East Germany in 1968.

Individual

- Karl-Heinz Kutschke
- Jörg Tscherner
- Wolfgang Lüderitz

Team

- Karl-Heinz Kutschke
- Jörg Tscherner
- Wolfgang Lüderitz

== Rowing ==
East Germany had 26 male rowers participate in all seven rowing events in 1968.

Men's single sculls

- Achim Hill

Men's double sculls

- Uli Schmied
- Manfred Haake

Men's coxless pair – 1st place ( gold medal)

- Jörg Lucke
- Heinz-Jürgen Bothe

Men's coxed pair

- Helmut Wollmann
- Wolfgang Gunkel
- Klaus-Dieter Neubert

Men's coxless four – 1st place ( gold medal)

- Frank Forberger
- Dieter Grahn
- Frank Rühle
- Dieter Schubert

Men's coxed four – 2nd place ( silver medal)

- Peter Kremtz
- Roland Göhler
- Manfred Gelpke
- Klaus Jacob
- Dieter Semetzky

Men's eight

- Günter Bergau
- Klaus-Dieter Bähr
- Claus Wilke
- Peter Gorny
- Reinhard Zerfowski
- Peter Hein
- Manfred Schneider
- Peter Prompe
- Karl-Heinz Danielowski

== Shooting ==
Nine shooters, all men, represented East Germany in 1968. Harald Vollmar won bronze in the 50 m pistol and Kurt Czekalla won bronze in the trap.

25 m pistol

- Christian Düring
- Gerhard Dommrich

50 m pistol

- Harald Vollmar
- Helmut Artelt

300 m rifle, three positions

- Hartmut Sommer
- Uto Wunderlich

50 m rifle, three positions

- Uto Wunderlich
- Hartmut Sommer

50 m rifle, prone

- Hartmut Sommer
- Werner Heyn

Trap

- Kurt Czekalla
- Rudolf Hager

== Volleyball ==
Men's team competition

- Round robin
  - Lost to Czechoslovakia (2-3)
  - Lost to Japan (0-3)
  - Defeated Mexico (3-0)
  - Defeated Belgium (3-0)
  - Lost to Soviet Union (2-3)
  - Defeated United States (3-0)
  - Defeated Brazil (3-1)
  - Defeated Bulgaria (3-2)
  - Defeated Poland (3-0) → Fourth place
- Team roster
  - Horst Peter
  - Eckhardt Tielscher
  - Siegfried Schneider
  - Manfred Heine
  - Rainer Tscharke
  - Eckehard Pietzsch
  - Arnold Schulz
  - Rudi Schumann
  - Jürgen Kessel
  - Walter Toissant
  - Jürgen Freiwald
  - Wolfgang Webner

== Water polo ==
Men's Team Competition

- Preliminary Round (Group B)
  - Defeated Mexico (12:4)
  - Tied with Yugoslavia (4:4)
  - Lost to Italy (4:5)
  - Defeated Greece (11:4)
  - Defeated Japan (8:0)
  - Defeated United Arab Republic (19:2)
  - Defeated Netherlands (8:3)
- Classification Matches
  - 5th/8th place: Defeated Cuba (8:2)
  - 5th/6th place: Lost to United States (4:6) → Sixth place
- Team Roster
  - Hans-Georg Fehn
  - Hans-Ulrich Lange
  - Hans-Jürgen Schüler
  - Manfred Herzog
  - Peter Rund
  - Veit Herrmanns
  - Jürgen Kluge
  - Jürgen Thiel
  - Klaus Schlenkrich
  - Peter Schmidt
  - Siegfried Ballerstedt
