= Salah ad-Din (name) =

Salah ad-Din (Arabic: صلاح الدين) is a masculine given name and surname of Arabic origin that means The Righteousness of the Faith. It commonly refers to An-Nasir Salah ad-Din Yusuf ibn Ayyub (Arabic: صلاح الدين يوسف بن أيوب), better known as Saladin, the first sultan of Egypt and Syria and the founder of the Ayyubid dynasty. Notable people with the name include:

== Given name ==
=== Salah al-Deen ===
- Salah al-Deen Hafez (1938–2008), Egyptian writer and journalist
- Salah Al-Deen Siamand (born 1981), Iraqi footballer

=== Salah al-Din ===
- Salah al-Din al-Ala'i (1295–1359), Mamluk Islamic scholar
- Salah al-Din al-Bitar (1912–1980), Syrian politician
- Salah al-Din al-Sabbagh (1889–1945), Iraqi Army officer and Arab nationalist

=== Salah El-Din ===
- Salah El-Din Fatih (1924–??), Egyptian boxer
- Salah El-Dine Nessim, Egyptian basketball player
- Salah El-Din El-Sahrawi (1925–2008), Egyptian water polo player
- Salah El-Din Shalabi (born 1949), Egyptian water polo player
- Salah el-Dine Tarazi (1917–1980), Syrian lawyer and diplomat
- Salah El-Din al-Tijani (born 1958), Egyptian Islamic scholar and writer

=== Salah Ud Din ===
- Salah ud Din Khan (born 1963), Pakistani politician
- Salah Ud Din Khan, Pakistani politician

=== Salah Eddine ===
- Salah-Eddine Bounasr (born 1990), Moroccan long-distance runner
- Salah Eddine Dahmoune (born 1964), Algerian politician
- Salah Eddin Zaimeche Al-Djazair, British academic and author
- Salah-Eddine Oulad M'Hand (born 2003), Dutch footballer
- Salah Eddine Mraouni (born 1992), Moroccan cyclist

=== Salah Edin ===
- Salah Edin (born 1980), Dutch-Moroccan rapper and actor

=== Salah Uddin ===
- Salah Uddin Ahmed (1945–2026), Bangladeshi politician
- Salah Uddin Kamran, Bangladeshi politician

=== Saleh Uddin ===
- Saleh Uddin Ahmed, Bangladeshi politician

=== Saladin ===
- Saladin (1137–1193), Ayyubid sultan
- Saladin Ahmed (born 1975), American comic book and fantasy writer
- Saladin Ambar, American political scientist
- Saladin Bargicho (born 1994), Ethiopian footballer
- Saladin Martin (born 1956), American football player
- Saladin McCullough (born 1975), American football player
- Saladin K. Patterson, American television writer and producer
- Saladin Said (born 1988), Ethiopian footballer
- Saladin Schmitt (1883–1951), German theatre director

=== Salahaddin ===
- Salahaddin Bahaaddin (born 1950), Iraqi politician
- Salahaddin Kazimov (1920–1978), Azerbaijani war hero
- Salahaddin Khalilov (born 1952), Azerbaijani philosopher

=== Salahaldeen ===
- Salahaldeen Farash (born 2006), Jordanian footballer

=== Salahdine ===
- Salahdine Hmied (born 1961), Moroccan footballer
- Salahdine Parnasse (born 1997), French mixed martial artist and boxer

=== Salaheddine ===
- Salaheddine Aqqal (born 1984), Moroccan footballer
- Salaheddine Bassir (born 1972), Moroccan footballer
- Salaheddin Bayani (1938–??), Iranian politician
- Salaheddine Benyachou (born 1999), Moroccan footballer
- Salaheddine Bouziani (born 2006), Algerian footballer
- Salaheddine Chihab (born 1993), Moroccan footballer
- Salaheddine Icharane (born 1997), Moroccan footballer
- Salaheddine Mezouar (born 1953), Moroccan politician
- Salaheddine Al-Safi (born 1980), Qatari sprinter
- Salaheddine Saidi (born 1987), Moroccan footballer
- Salaheddine Sbaï (born 1985), Moroccan footballer
- Salaheddine Ben Yazide (born 2003), Moroccan steeplechaser

=== Salahiddine ===
- Salahiddine Khlifi (born 1979), Moroccan footballer

=== Salahuddin ===
- Salahuddin of Aceh (died 1548), Indonesian sultan
- Salahuddin of Selangor (1926–2001), Malaysian sultan
- Salahuddin (cricketer) (born 1947), Pakistani cricketer
- Salahuddin (cricketer, born 1998) (born 1998), Pakistani cricketer
- Salahuddin (film director) (1926–2003), Bangladeshi film director
- Salahuddin (Hyderabad politician), Pakistani politician
- Salahuddin (wrestler) (born 1948), Pakistani wrestler
- Salahuddin Ahmad (1947/48–2025), Bangladeshi lawyer and politician
- Salahuddin Ahmed (Chapai Nawabganj politician), Bangladeshi politician
- Salahuddin Ahmed (Cox's Bazar politician) (born 1962), Bangladeshi politician and lawyer
- Salahuddin Ahmed (judge) (1912–??), Pakistani judge
- Salahuddin Aiyubi, Bangladeshi politician
- Salahuddin Ayub (1961–2023), Malaysian politician
- Salahud-Din Bakhtiar (died 1680), Sultan of the Sulu Sultanate
- Salahuddin Noman Chowdhury (born 1969), Bangladeshi diplomat
- Salahuddin Quader Chowdhury (1949–2015), Bangladeshi politician
- Salahuddin Junejo, Pakistani politician
- Salahuddin Khan, Pakistani politician
- Salahuddin Lavlu (born 1962), Bangladeshi television film director, actor, and screenwriter
- Salahuddin Khan Mehsud, Pakistani police officer
- Salahuddin Miaji (born 1962), Bangladeshi Army general
- Salahuddin Mian (1938–2006), Pakistani ceramic artist
- Salahuddin Mustafa Muhammad, American imam
- Salahuddin Ahmed Mukti (born 1973), Bangladeshi politician
- Salahuddin Panhwar (born 1966), Pakistani judge
- Salahuddin Parvez (1954–2011), Indian poet, novelist, editor, and literary critic
- Salahuddin Rabbani (born 1971), politician
- Salahuddin Sardar, Bangladeshi politician
- Salahuddin Satti (born 1951), Pakistan Army general
- Salahuddin Shishani (died 2017), Georgian jihadist
- Salahuddin Sumon (born 1984), Bangladeshi journalist and content creator
- Salahuddin Tirmizi (born 1943), Pakistani politician
- Salahuddin Tunio (born 1949), Pakistani actor
- Salahuddin Wahid (1942–2020), Indonesian Islamic scholar and politician
- Salahuddin Yusuf (died 2000), Bangladeshi politician

=== Salahudin ===
- Salahudin (footballer, born 1970) (born 1970), Indonesian football player and manager
- Salahudin Awae (born 1983), Thai footballer

=== Salauddin ===
- Salauddin Ahmed (born 1967), Bangladeshi contemporary architect
- Salauddin Mahmud (born 1960), Bangladeshi politician
- Salauddin Mumtaz (1945–1971), Bangladeshi military officer
- Salauddin Pappu (born 1980), Bangladeshi cricketer
- Salauddin Sakil (born 1989), Bangladeshi cricketer

=== Salehuddin ===
- Salehuddin of Perak (died 1636), Sultan of Perak
- Salehuddin of Selangor (1705–1782), Sultan of Selangor
- Salehuddin Ahmed (economist) (born 1949), Bangladeshi economist

=== Sallehuddin ===
- Sallehuddin of Kedah (born 1942), Malaysian sultan
- Sallehuddin Damit (born 1973), Bruneian footballer
- Sallehuddin Mohamed (born 1932), Malaysian civil servant

== Surname ==
=== Salah al-Din ===
- Al-Nasir Muhammad Salah al-Din (1338–1391), Yemeni imam

=== Salah El-Din ===
- Walid Salah El-Din (born 1971), Egyptian footballer

=== Saleh Uddin ===
- Md Saleh Uddin (born 1952), Bangladeshi professor

=== Saladin ===
- Lorenz Saladin (1896–1936), Swiss mountain-climber, journalist, photographer, and traveler
- Louis Saladin, French composer
- Olivier Saladin (born 1952), French actor

=== Salahuddin ===
- Abang Muhammad Salahuddin (1921–2022), Malaysian politician
- Abubakr Ben Ishmael Salahuddin, American religious writer
- Adil Salahuddin (born 1939), Pakistani stamp designer
- Bashir Salahuddin (born 1976), American actor, writer, and comedian
- Dawud Salahuddin (born 1950), American assassin
- Gazi Salahuddin (born 1984), Bangladeshi cricketer
- Ghazi Salahuddin (born 1939), Pakistani journalist and scholar
- Husain Salahuddin (1881–1948), writer and scholar
- Izuan Salahuddin (born 1991), Malaysian footballer
- Kazi Salahuddin (born 1953), Bangladeshi footballer
- Masood Salahuddin (1915–2006), Pakistani cricket umpire
- Mohammad Salahuddin (born 1973/74), Bangladeshi cricket coach
- Nawabzada Farid Salahuddin, Pakistani politician
- Qazi Salahuddin (born 1942), Pakistani field hockey player
- Shaikh Salahuddin (Hyderabad politician), Pakistani politician
- Sheikh Salahuddin (cricketer) (1969–2013), Bangladeshi cricketer
- Sheikh Salahuddin (Karachi politician) (born 1956), Pakistani politician
- Usman Salahuddin (born 1990), Pakistani cricketer
- Yousuf Salahuddin (born 1951), Pakistani philanthropist and politician

=== Salahudeen ===
- Sayeed Salahudeen (born 1946), Indian militant

== See also ==
- Saladin (disambiguation), for other uses including fictional characters
- Selahattin, the Turkish version of the name
- Salahuddin Ahmed (disambiguation)
