= Jalal =

Masculine name

- Gender: male

Origin
- Word/name: Arabic
- Meaning: Majesty, lordliness, loftiness, greatness, splendor, solemnity, glory.

Jalal or Galal (Arabic: جلال) is a masculine given and surname of Arabic origin. The name or word Jalal means majesty and is used to honor and venerate. When the Arabic language spread across non-Arabic regions, Jalal has also become a name for some Arabic-speaking Christians, non-Arab Muslims, and non-Arabs and has been added to other language dictionaries with the majestic meaning. Another form is Galal (typically seen in the Egyptian Dialect), where the first letter "ج" is pronounced like hard g /g/ in English. Galal might have other meanings in different languages. Notable people with the name include:

== Examples ==
The word Jalal could be found in many history, art, religious, and poetry books. For example:

- Jalal is used as a characteristic when addressing royals like kings and lords in history, myth, and formal occasion.
- Jalál the second month and the Saturday as a first day of the week in the Bahá’í calendar.
- In the Bible, Jalal is used as a veneration for God in Psalms (111:3), (145:5), etc., Isaiah (26:10), (30:30), etc., and the Great Doxology, written and read in Churches in Arabic.

== Given name ==
=== Galal ===
- Galal Amer (1952–2012), Egyptian journalist
- Galal Amin (1935–2018), Egyptian economist and academic
- Galal El-Behairy (born 1990), Egyptian poet, songwriter, and political prisoner
- Galal Ibrahim (1942–2021), Egyptian football club president
- Galal Keraitam (1913–1961), Egyptian footballer
- Galal al-Morra, Egyptian politician
- Galal Saeed, Egyptian engineer and politician
- Galal Touny (born 1950), Egyptian water polo player
- Galal Walker (born 1943), American academic
- Galal Yafai (born 1992), British boxer

=== Jalal ===
- Jalal Abdi (born 1993), Iranian footballer
- Jalal Abdoh (1909–1996), Iranian diplomat, lawyer, and politician
- Jalal Abdul-Rahman (1944–2026), Iraqi footballer
- Jalal Abdullai (born 2005), Ghanaian footballer
- Jalal Afshar (1894–1975), Iranian scientist, phytopathologist, entomologist, and academic
- Jalal Agha (1945–1995), Indian actor and director
- Jalal Ahmad (born 1959), Bangladeshi architect
- Jalal Al-e-Ahmad (1923–1969), Iranian writer, thinker, and critic
- Jalal Ahmed (bureaucrat) (born 1961), Bangladeshi civil servant
- Jalal Ahmed (politician) (1921–2009), Bangladeshi politician
- Jalal Akbari (born 1983), Iranian footballer
- Jalal Alamgir (1971–2011), Bangladeshi-American academic
- Jalal Aliyev (1928–2016), Azerbaijani scientist, statesman, and academic
- Jalal Allakhverdiyev (1929–2017), Azerbaijani mathematician
- Jalal Baba (1901–1981), Pakistani politician
- Jalal Baleedi (1981/82–2016), Yemeni Islamist militant
- Jalal Barjas (born 1970), Jordanian author and journalist
- Jalal Barzanji (born 1953), Iraqi poet, writer, and activist
- Jalal Bazargan (born 1939), Iranian gymnast
- Jalal Bazzaz, Lebanese rugby league footballer
- Jalal Chafai (born 1980), Moroccan tennis player
- Jalal Chandio (1944–2001), Pakistani folk singer
- Jalal Cheraghpour (born 1950), Iranian football manager and player
- Jalal Dabagh (born 1939), Iraqi politician and writer
- Jalal Damja (born 1966), Libyan football coach
- Jalal Daoudi (born 1988), Moroccan footballer
- jalal Dashti (born 1983) Kuwait Geologists
- Jalal al-Dawla (994–1044), Buyid Emir of Iraq
- Jalal Dhiyab (died 2013), Iraqi civil rights activist and politician
- Jalal Faqira (born 1967), Yemeni politician and diplomat
- Jalal Garyaghdi (1914–2001), Azerbaijani sculptor
- Jalal Harutyunyan (born 1974), Armenian Army general
- Jalal Shamshuddin bin Hasan (died 1568), Indian Islamic religious leader
- Jalal Hassan (born 1991), Iraqi footballer
- Jalal Hosseini (born 1982), Iranian footballer
- Jalal Jalalizadeh (born 1960), Iranian politician
- Jalal Jayed (born 1987), Moroccan football referee
- Jalal Keshmiri (1938–1999), Iranian shot putter and discus thrower
- Jalal Khan, Legendary Iranian person
- Jalal Khan (athlete) (1927–??), Pakistani javelin thrower
- Jalal Khan (politician), Pakistani politician
- Jalal Khoury (1933–2017), Lebanese playwright, theater director, and comedian
- Jalal Kiani (born 1989), Iranian handball player
- Jalal Lakhnavi (died 1909), Indian poet, writer, and scholar
- Jalal Leach (born 1969), American baseball player
- Jalal Maghami (1941–2022), Iranian voice actor and announcer
- Jalal Malaksha (1951–2020), Iranian poet, writer, political activist, translator, and journalist
- Jalal Mammadov (1918–1983), Azerbaijani writer and translator
- Jalal Mansouri (1930–2012), Iranian weightlifter
- Jalal Matini (1928–2025), Iranian writer
- Jalal Merhi (born 1957), Canadian action film producer
- Jalal Kameli Mofrad (born 1981), Iranian footballer
- Jalal Moghadam (1929–1996), Iranian film director, screenwriter, film critic, and actor
- Jalal Sheikh Naji (born 1968), Iraqi politician
- Jalal Mansur Nuriddin (1944–2018), American poet
- Jalal Omidian (born 1978), Iranian football coach and player
- Jalal Khan Orakzai (died 1717), Afghan-Mughal soldier
- Jalal Pishvaian (1930–2021), Iranian actor
- Jalal Qanuni (1900–??), Iranian musician
- Jalal Rafkhaei (born 1984), Iranian footballer
- Jalal Abdul Carim Sahib (1865–1939), Indian businessman
- Jalal Sattari (1931–2021), Iranian Iranologist, mythologist, writer, and translator
- Jalal Shaker (born 1963), Iraqi footballer
- Jalal Tabib Shirazi, Iranian poet and physician
- Jalal Jalal Shokouhi (born 1950), Iranian radiologist, writer, and researcher
- Jalal Al-Sinani (born 1986), Omani footballer
- Jalal Talabani (1933–2017), Iraqi politician
- Jalal Talebi (born 1942), Iranian football player and manager
- Jalal Tehrani (born 1968), Iranian playwright, theatre director, and educator
- Jalal Jamal Bin Thaneya (born 1986), Emirati activist
- Jalal Toufic (born 1962), Lebanese artist, filmmaker, and author
- Jalal Yousef (1979–2021), Venezuelan pool player
- Jalal Haji Zawar (died 2019), Iranian spy
- Jalal Zolfonun (1937–2012), Iranian composer and setar player

== Surname ==
=== Galal ===
- Ahmed Galal (disambiguation), multiple people
- Nader Galal (1941–2014), Egyptian television and film director
- Ramez Galal (born 1973), Egyptian comic, actor, and singer

=== Jalal ===
- Ayesha Jalal (born 1956), Pakistani-American historian
- Aziza Jalal (born 1958), Moroccan Arabic pop singer
- Farida Jalal (born 1950), Iranian actor
- Imrana Jalal, Indian-Fijian lawyer and activist
- Massouda Jalal (born 1964), Afghan politician
- Sayed Mahmood Jalal (born 1980), Bahraini footballer
- Shah Jalal (1271–1346), Bengali Sufi saint
- Shwan Jalal (born 1983), Iraqi-English footballer

== Fictional characters ==
- Galal, main character of the Galal trilogy by Egyptian author Kamal Ruhayyim

== See also ==
- Galal Studios, a film studio in Cairo, Egypt
- Djalal, Indonesian form of the name
- Jalil (disambiguation)
- Jalal-ud-din Muhammad Akbar (born 1542), Mughal sultan
