= United Arab Republic at the 1968 Summer Olympics =

- Flag of the United Arab Republic
- IOC code: RAU
- NOC: United Arab Republic

in Mexico City
- Competitors: 30 in 7 sports
- Medals: Gold 0 Silver 0 Bronze 0 Total 0

Summer Olympics appearances (overview)
- 1960; 1964

Other related appearances
- Egypt (1912–pres.); Syria (1948–pres.)

Egypt, as the United Arab Republic, competed at the 1968 Summer Olympics in Mexico City, Mexico. 30 competitors, all men, took part in 18 events in 7 sports.

== Diving ==
Men

Athlete	Event	Preliminary		Final			
Athlete	Event	Points	Rank	Points	Rank	Total	Rank
Waguih Aboul Seoud	3 m springboard	85.89	19	Did not advance			

== Fencing ==
Four fencers, all men, represented Egypt in 1968.

Men's foil

- Ahmed El-Hamy El-Husseini
- Mohamed Gamil El-Kalyoubi
- Moustafa Soheim

Men's team foil

- Ahmed El-Hamy El-Husseini, Mohamed Gamil El-Kalyoubi, Moustafa Soheim, Ahmed Zein El-Abidin

Men's épée

- Ahmed Zein El-Abidin

== Shooting ==
Two shooters represented Egypt in 1968.

Trap

- Mohamed Mehrez
- Badir Shoukri

== Water polo ==
Men's Team Competition

- Preliminary Round (Group B)
  - Lost to Yugoslavia (2:13)
  - Lost to Italy (1:10)
  - Lost to Greece (6:7)
  - Lost to Japan (4:7)
  - Lost to Netherlands (3:6)
  - Lost to East Germany (2:19)
  - Tied with Mexico (3:3)
- Classification Matches
  - 13th/15th place: Lost to Brazil (3:5) → Fifteenth place
- Team Roster
  - Adel El-Moalem
  - Alaa El-Shafei
  - Ashraf Gamil
  - Galal Touny
  - Haroun Touny
  - Hossam El-Baroudi
  - Khaled El-Kashef
  - Mohamed El-Bassiouni
  - Sameh Soliman
  - Salah Shalaby
  - Sameh Soliman
