= Spain at the 1968 Summer Olympics =

- IOC code: ESP
- NOC: Spanish Olympic Committee

in Mexico City
- Competitors: 122 (120 men, 2 women) in 12 sports
- Flag bearer: Gonzalo Fernández
- Medals: Gold 0 Silver 0 Bronze 0 Total 0

Summer Olympics appearances (overview)
- 1900; 1904–1912; 1920; 1924; 1928; 1932; 1936; 1948; 1952; 1956; 1960; 1964; 1968; 1972; 1976; 1980; 1984; 1988; 1992; 1996; 2000; 2004; 2008; 2012; 2016; 2020; 2024; 2028

Spain competed at the 1968 Summer Olympics in Mexico City, Mexico. 122 competitors, 120 men and 2 women, took part in 50 events in 12 sports.

== Canoeing ==
Men's K-4 1000 metres

- José Perurena, Ángel Villar, Gerardo López, Pedro Cuesta - eliminated in the repechages

== Cycling ==
Seven cyclists represented Spain in 1968.

Individual road race

- José Gómez
- Luis Zubero
- Miguel Lasa
- Agustín Tamames

Team time trial

- Nemesio Jiménez
- José Gómez
- José González
- Miguel Lasa

Individual pursuit

- Daniel Yuste

== Shooting ==
Twelve shooters, all men, represented Spain in 1968.

Open

Athlete	Event	Final	
Athlete	Event	Points	Rank
José Álava	25 m rapid fire pistol	570	45
José Amedo	50 m free pistol	542	33
Jaime Bladas	Trap	194	9
José Luis Calvo	50 m rifle prone	590	37
Luis del Cerro	50 m rifle three positions	1123	42
José Cusí	Trap	192	14
Juan García	50 m free pistol	534	41
Jaime González	25 m rapid fire pistol	579	31
Miguel Marina	Skeet	191	12
José Luis Martínez	Skeet	183	36
José María Pigrau	50 m rifle three positions	1117	46
José del Villar	50 m rifle prone	577	82

== Water polo ==
=== Men's team competition ===
- Preliminary Round (Group A)

- Lost to West Germany (3:5)
- Lost to United States (7:10)
- Lost to Hungary (1:7)
- Lost to Soviet Union (0:5)
- Tied with Brazil (6:6)
- Lost to Cuba (3:4)

- Classification Matches

- 9th/12th place: Defeated Japan (5:0)
- 9th/10th place: Defeated West Germany (7:5) → Ninth place

- Team Roster

- Agustin Codera
- Fermin Mas
- Jorge Borell
- José Padros
- Juan Jane
- Juan Rubio
- Luis Bestit
- Luis Meya
- Manuel Ibern
- Santiago Zubicoa
- Vicente Brugat
