= El-Shafei =

El-Shafei, El Shafei or ElShafei (Arabic: الشافعي), also seen with different capitalisations, is an Egyptian surname. Notable people with this surname include:

- Abdel Aziz El-Shafei (born 1931), Egyptian swimmer
- Adli El Shafei
- Adli El Shafei II (born 1973), Egyptian tennis player
- Alaa El-Din El-Shafei (born 1950), Egyptian water polo player
- Aly El-Shafei, Egyptian engineer
- Emad El-Shafei (born 1966), Egyptian swimmer
- Hassan El Shafei (born 1982), Egyptian artist
- Hussein el-Shafei
- Ismail El Shafei (born 1947), Egyptian tennis player
- Yassin ElShafei (born 2001), Egyptian squash player

== See also ==
- Al-Shafi'i
