= Saladin (disambiguation) =

Saladin (An-Nasir Salah ad-Din Yusuf ibn Ayyub, 1137–1193), was the first sultan of Egypt and Syria and founder of the Ayyubid dynasty.

Saladin, Salah el-Din, Salah ad-Din, Salah ed-Din and other variations (Arabic: صلاح الدين) may also refer to:

== Arts, entertainment and media ==
- Kudüs Fatihi Selahaddin Eyyubi, a TV series produced by Turkey's Akli Films and Pakistan’s Ansari and Shah Films
- Salladin the Victorious, or Al Nasser Salah Ad-Din, a 1963 epic Egyptian film
- Saladin: The Animated Series, a TV series
- Statue of Saladin, in Damascus, Syria
- Saladin Chamcha, a protagonist in The Satanic Verses
- Saladin Paracelsus de Lambertine Evagne von Smith, full name of the fictional character Button-Bright
- Ghazi Salahuddin, 1939 Indian film by I. A. Hafesjee, starring Ghulam Mohammed as the sultan
- Kingdom of Heaven a 2005 epic historical drama

== People ==
- Salah ad-Din (name), including a list of all people with variants of the name
- William Stewart Ross (1844–1906), a Scottish writer and publisher, pseudonym Saladin
- Salahuddin Aiyubi, Bangladeshi politician

== Places ==
- Salaheddine District, in Aleppo, Syria
- Saladin Governorate, in Iraq
- Citadel of Salah Ed-Din, northwest Syria
- Salah al-Din Road, in the Gaza Strip

== Other uses ==
- Alvis Saladin, an armoured car
- Saladin (barque), a 19th century British ship
- Salahaddin FC, an Iraqi football team
- Salahaddin University-Erbil in Kurdistan, Iraq
- MV Salahuddin-2, a ferry, sank in Bangladesh 2002
- SS Salah el-Din, a ship launched as SS Atchison Victory
- Al-Nasser Salah al-Deen Brigades

== See also ==
- Selahattin, a related Turkish given name
