= Sergio Ramos (disambiguation) =

Sergio Ramos (born 1986) is a Spanish professional footballer.

Sergio Ramos may also refer to:

- Sérgio Ramos (basketball) (born 1975), Portuguese basketball coach and former player
- Sergio Ramos (water polo) (born 1941), Mexican water polo player
