= 1992 Summer Olympics opening ceremony =

- Part of 1992 Summer Olympics
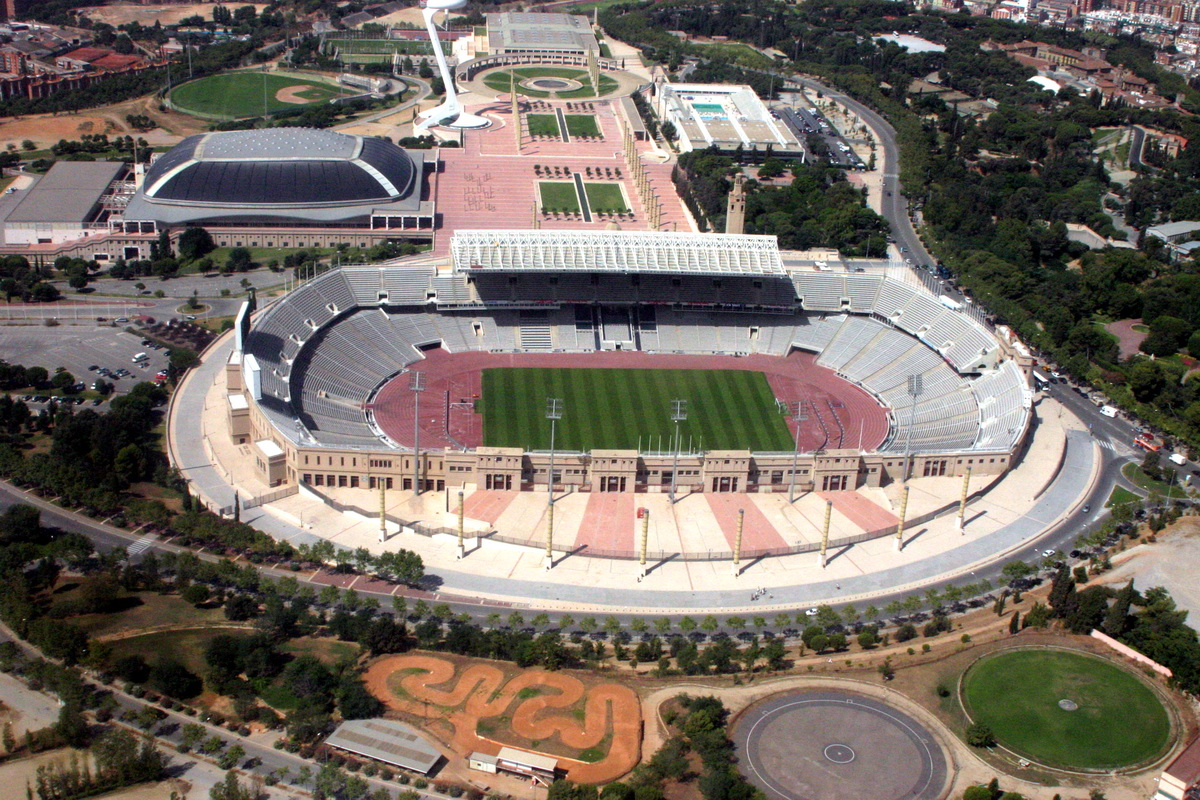
- The Estadi Olímpic de Montjuïc, the venue of the opening ceremony.
- Date: 25 July 1992; 34 years ago
- Time: 20:00 – 23:08 CEST (UTC+2)
- Venue: Estadi Olímpic de Montjuïc
- Location: Barcelona, Catalonia, Spain; 41°21′53.14″N 2°9′20.37″E
- Filmed by: Ràdio Televisió Olímpica '92 (RTO'92)
- Footage: Barcelona 1992 Opening Ceremony on YouTube

The opening ceremony of the 1992 Summer Olympics took place on the evening of Saturday 25 July 1992 at Estadi Olímpic de Montjuïc, Barcelona, Catalonia, Spain, during which the Games were formally opened by King Juan Carlos I. As mandated by the Olympic Charter, the proceedings combined the formal and ceremonial opening of this international sporting event, including welcoming speeches, hoisting of the flags and the parade of athletes, with an artistic spectacle to showcase the host nation's culture and history.

The ceremony began at 20:00 CEST and lasted just over three hours. By a purely creative decision, this was the first Summer Olympics opening ceremony since Los Angeles 1984 to be held at dusk in the host city. This revolutionized the production of various shows around the world, since during the cultural segment's natural light was the protagonist and during the protocol it was artificial light that stood out give it more spectacularity, something that has become a standard since then. It was watched by an estimated worldwide television audience of 3.5 billion and had a total cost of 2.8 billion pesetas (€16.8 million). It was the largest gathering of international dignitaries for an Olympic –and sporting– event until then.

The ceremony was conceived by publicists Luis Bassat and Pepo Sol. Raising certain controversies was up to the group La Fura dels Baus, the performance of an allegory about of the greek myth who led creation of the Mediterranean Sea and resulted on the founding of the city of Barcelona. Greek mezzo-soprano Agnes Baltsa sang "Hellenism" as the Olympic flag was taken around the stadium. Alfredo Kraus sang the Olympic Hymn as the flag was hoisted. The Olympic flame cauldron was lit by a flaming arrow, shot by Paralympic archer Antonio Rebollo. which was the original design of the lighting scheme.

== Preparations ==
The ideas of the opening ceremony were conceived by publicists Luis Bassat and Pepo Sol, who came together for the occasion creating the production company Ovideo-Bassat-Sport. The artistic director of the ceremony was Manuel Huerga, the executive musical director was Josep Pons, its executive director was the Australian Ric Birch and its production director Cuqui Pons. Judich Chabola, an expert in moving masses of people, was hired for the choreographies, with the help of the Gran Teatre del Liceu stage manager Xesca Llabrés.

The ceremony was attended by 65,000 people at the stadium. Approximately 60,000 tickets were sold to the general public while another 5,000 were distributed to the Olympic family, in addition to courtesies and quotas for sponsors and partners. . Tickets for the general public had three price categories: 46,000 pesetas (€276.47) for the grandstand tickets, 18,000 pesetas (€108.18) for preferential tickets, and 9,000 pesetas (€54.09) for general tickets. The ceremony had a total cost of 2.8 billion pesetas (€16.8 million).

=== Music ===
The opening ceremony featured incidental music composed specifically for the occasion by Ryuichi Sakamoto, Angelo Badalamenti and Carlos Miranda. The Olympic Fanfarre who was used in all Olympic announcements was composed by Carles Santos. There were two additional main songs composed for the Games. One was "Barcelona", composed five years earlier by Freddie Mercury and sung as a duet with Montserrat Caballé. Due to Mercury's death eight months earlier, the duo was unable to perform the song during the opening ceremony. A recording of the song instead played over a travelogue until the start of the live broadcast. The second song was "Amigos Para Siempre", composed by Andrew Lloyd Webber and Don Black. In the opening ceremony, it was performed by a choir while an Olympic flag covered the athletes.

== Proceedings ==
=== Countdown ===
A fifty-second countdown with twenty-five bangs, one for each Olympics, preceded the ceremony, with the audience present at the stadium doing the final countdown in the four official languages of the event: French, Catalan, English and Spanish. (Note: The final countdown was: Vingt, dix-neuf, dix-huit, dix-sept, seize, quinze, catorze, tretze, dotze, onze, ten, nine, eight, seven, six, cinco, cuatro, tres, dos, uno.)

=== ¡Hola! ===
At 20:00 CEST, the stadium speakers, Constantino Romero and Inka Martí, welcomed the audience in the four official languages while 800 artists simulating flowers and birds, remembering Las Ramblas, began to move on the blue rug that covered the central field of the stadium accompanied by the "Olympic fanfare" composed by Carles Santos and played by seventy-four musicians with drums, trumpets and tenoras. The cast of this segment walked together to form the word ¡Hola!, while the audience present shouted the greeting several times to welcome the world. Subsequently, they transformed the word into the winking logo of the city of Barcelona first and into the logo of the 1992 Summer Olympic Games later.

=== Anthems ===
At 20:05 CEST, the flags of Spain, Catalonia, and Barcelona were taken in front the Royal Box. King Juan Carlos I and Queen Sofía entered the stadium while the Anthem of Catalonia was playing. Once in their seats, the Anthem of Spain was played and after which the Patrulla Águila aerobatic planes flew over the stadium right on cue, leaving trails of smoke in the sky in the colors of the Olympic flag.

=== Sou benvinguts (Welcome) ===
At 20:07 CEST, Montserrat Caballé and José Carreras, accompanied by cobla La Principal de la Bisbal, sang "Sou benvinguts", a welcoming Olympic sardana composed by Josep Lluís Moraleda and Lluís Serrahima, while a giant circle dance was formed by 600 dancers dressed in white in the center of the stadium in the shape of the five Olympic rings. The same cobla then played the "Cant de la Senyera", a Catalan popular song composed by Lluís Millet in 1896, while the dancers took the shape of a heart after which 1,500 doves were released.

=== España: tierra de pasión (Spain: Land of passion) ===
At 20:12 CEST, 360 drummers from Bajo Aragón descended through the stadium stands playing their drums followed by 300 musicians from Levante playing the passacaglia from Night Music of the Streets of Madrid composed by Luigi Boccherini in 1780. Plácido Domingo sang "Te quiero morena", a jota from the zarzuela El trust de los tenorios composed by José Serrano in 1910, while Cristina Hoyos crossed the central ground on horseback among 200 dancers. Once on stage, Hoyos joined twelve couples who were dancing a sevillana and then she did a flamenco routine, after which he got back on her horse and left. Then, Alfredo Kraus sang "Del cabello más sutil", a Spanish song composed by Fernando Obradors in 1921.

=== El mar Mediterráneo/El mar Mediterrani (The Mediterranean Sea) ===
At 20:30 CEST, La Fura dels Baus performed the segment called "El Mar Mediterráneo" accompanied with incidental music composed and conducted by Ryuichi Sakamoto. Hercules, who appeared in the form of a giant competing in the first Olympic Games, opened the Pillars of Hercules, separating Africa from Europe, and creating the Mediterranean Sea. A boat appeared among the waves, which unfurled its sails and prepared to fight against a series of sea monsters which it defeated thanks to divine intervention and allegorically founding the city of Barcelona, as a symbol of civilization. Finally, the Catalan traditional song "Virolai", composed by Josep Rodoreda in 1880 and adapted by Sakamoto himself, is performed.

=== Parade of Nations ===
At 20:53 CEST, following eighty gymnasts waving ribbons with the Olympic colors, the parade of nations began, starting with the Greek team, accompanied by the beat of a special tracklist composed and conducted by Carlos Miranda. Due to political tensions surrounding the use of Spanish or Catalan, the organizing committee determined that the protocol for the Games would be based on articles 27 and 64 of the then-current version of the Olympic Charter, adopting French as the standard language for the Olympic protocol. Brunei participated in the parade, but its delegation consisted of only one official. (Note: This also occurred in the 1988 Games.) The Afghan delegation did not arrive in time to participate in the opening ceremony, but its flag was paraded by a volunteer. Liberia and Somalia also participated in the parade, but its accredited athletes (five and two, respectively) also didn't arrive in time for the ceremony.

At 22:02 CEST, the last and host team, the Spanish team, entered the stadium marching behind its flag bearer Felipe, then Prince of Asturias. After going around the stadium, they took their place next to the rest of the athletes, covering the entire field.

=== Official speeches and Opening Declaration ===
At 22:10 CEST, the Mayor of Barcelona Pasqual Maragall and the President of the International Olympic Committee Juan Antonio Samaranch made their speeches in the four official languages.

At 22:21 CEST, King Juan Carlos I declared the Games open, reciting the opening declaration with the following words:

"Benvinguts tots a Barcelona. Hoy, 25 de julio del año 1992, declaro abiertos los Juegos Olímpicos de Barcelona que celebran la XXV Olimpiada de la era moderna" – "Welcome everyone to Barcelona. Today, 25 July 1992, I declare open the Barcelona Olympic Games that celebrate the XXV Olympiad of the modern era"

— King Juan Carlos I

The King's first sentence was in Catalan, while the second sentence was in Spanish. An applause was heard in the audience when the King spoke Catalan.

=== Olympic flag ===
At 22:22 CEST, six Spanish Olympic medalists –José Manuel Abascal, Blanca Fernández Ochoa, Jorge Llopart, Lolo Ibern, José Luis Doreste and Eladio Vallduvi–, as well as two volunteers chosen by the Organizing Committee carried the Olympic flag around the stadium, while Agnes Baltsa accompanied by ninety-six musicians sang "Tha simánoun i kambánes", song composed and conducted by Mikis Theodorakis. Alfredo Kraus sang the Olympic Hymn in Catalan, Spanish and French while the Olympic flag was raised.

At 22:30 CEST, twenty-five top models, including Judit Mascó and Inés Sastre, exhibited dresses designed by thirteen Spanish couturiers representing the twenty-five host cities of the Games. While, through the central corridor created by the volunteers behind the athletes, twenty-five Olympic flags carried by twenty-five teenagers entered, each one representing each edition of the games. For the editions of 1916, canceled due to World War I, and for the 1940 and 1944 editions, canceled due to World War II, a dove of peace designed by Pablo Picasso replaced the Olympic rings.

=== Olympic flame ===
At 22:36 CEST, the Olympic flame entered the stadium, accompanied by music composed by Angelo Badalamenti and carried by Herminio Menéndez, who passed it to the last reliever Juan Antonio San Epifanio. The Paralympic archer Antonio Rebollo, who was waiting for him on stage, lit an arrow with the Olympic flame upon his arrival and shot it towards the cauldron. The arrow passed over the cauldron, which was emitting gas, which ignited, causing the entire audience to rejoice.

=== Olympic oath ===
At 22:42 CEST, Luis Doreste and Eugeni Asensio, representing the athletes and judges, took the Olympic oath.

=== Friends for life ===
At 22:43 CEST, sixty-two youth volunteers entered the central strip of the field holding the largest flag ever made until then, a 114 by 74 metres (374 ft × 243 ft) Olympic flag that had the same size of the stadium field. It was unfolded over the athletes accompanied by the symphonic version of "Amigos Para Siempre", composed by Andrew Lloyd Webber and Don Black, sang by a choir in English, Spanish and Catalan. Shortly after the ceremony, the flag was cut into 267,560 small pieces that were numbered and sold as a form of souvenir and funding for the Games.

At 22:47 CEST, 2,174 castellers built twelve castells representing the twelve countries of the European Economic Community.

=== Lyrical gala ===
At 22:53 CEST, Montserrat Caballé, Josep Carreras, Plácido Domingo, Jaume Aragall, Teresa Berganza and Juan Pons gave a seventeen arias recital accompanied by the Ciutat de Barcelona Orchestra conducted by Luis Antonio García.

At 23:08 CEST, Eleazar Colomé, a thirteen year old boy, performed Beethoven's "Ode to Joy" alongside the six opera singers and the choirs Orfeó Català, Coral Sant Jordi and Coral Càrmina while a large fireworks display closed the opening ceremony.

== Officials and guests ==
Presiding the Royal Box were King Juan Carlos I and Queen Sofía, accompanied by the President of the International Olympic Committee Juan Antonio Samaranch and his wife María Teresa Salisachs; the Prime Minister of Spain Felipe González and his wife Carmen Romero; the President of the Government of Catalonia Jordi Pujol and his wife Marta Ferrusola; and the Mayor of Barcelona Pasqual Maragall and his wife Diana Garrigosa.

The ceremony was the largest gathering of international dignitaries for an Olympic and sporting event until then, with many heads of state or government and representatives of foreign governments seated at the presidential box, and with almost all of the Ibero-American leaders present, due to the celebration of the 2nd Ibero-American Summit in Madrid the previous days. Foreign dignitaries present included British princess Anne, French president François Mitterrand, German chancellor Helmut Kohl, South African anti-apartheid activist Nelson Mandela, Cuban president Fidel Castro, Argentinian president Carlos Menem, American first lady Barbara Bush, South Korean first daughter Roh Soh-yeong and Thai crown prince Vajiralongkorn.

== Anthems ==
- National Anthem of Catalonia
- National Anthem of Spain
- (International Olympic Committee) Olympic Hymn – Alfredo Kraus

== TV coverage ==
The ceremony was reported to have an audience of 3.5 billion viewers worldwide. In Spain itself it had an audience of 5,957,000 viewers on average, which represented a 62.4% share, making it, to date, the most viewed opening ceremony of the Olympic Games ever. In the US, it had an estimated audience of 52 million viewers, with a Nielsen rating of 13.8 and an audience share of 29%.

== Legacy ==
The opening ceremony of the 1992 Summer Olympics was a turning point in the implementation of Olympic ceremonies and influenced those that followed. It was the first to be carried out at dusk, taking advantage of the darkness as a dramatic effect and playing with artificial lighting to give it more spectacularity, something that has become a standard since then. A large flag covering the athletes was a concept reused during the 2000 and 2004 opening ceremonies. The song "Hellenism", composed by Mikis Theodorakis,was also used again during the 2004 Summer Olympics Opening Ceremonies.
