= Shalabi (surname) =

Shalabi is a surname. Notable people with the surname include:

- Abdul Rahman Shalabi, Saudi detainee in Guantanamo Bay
- Ali Shalabi, Libyan weightlifter
- Hana Shalabi (born 1982), Palestinian prisoner
- Iyad Shalabi (born 1987), Israeli Paralympic swimmer
- Menna Shalabi (born 1981), Egyptian actress
- Mustafa Shalabi (died 1991), Egyptian charity founder and alleged terrorist
- Salah El-Din Shalabi (born 1949), Egyptian water polo player
