= Teicher =

Teicher is a surname. Notable people with the surname include:

- Craig Morgan Teicher (born 1979), American author
- Howard Teicher, former US National Security Council aide
- Louis Teicher (1924–2008), American pianist
- Mina Teicher, Israeli mathematician
- Peter Teicher (born 1944), German Olympic water polo player
- Victor Teicher, American investor and convicted felon
