= Selahattin =

Selahattin is the Turkish spelling of the Arabic Muslim masculine given name Salah ad-Din (Arabic: صَلَاح الدِّيْن ṣalāḥ ad-dīn). Notable people with the name include:

== People ==
- Selâhattin Âdil (1882–1961), Ottoman Army officer
- Selahattin Baki, Turkish businessman
- Selahattin Beyazıt (1931–2022), Turkish businessman
- Selahattin Çolak, Turkish politician
- Selahattin Demirtaş (born 1972), Kurdish-Turkish politician
- Selâhattin Kantar (1878–1949), Turkish archaeologist
- Selahattin Kınalı (born 1978), Turkish football player
- Selâhattin Köseoğlu (1882–1949), Turkish politician
- Selahattin Özmen, Turkish surgeon
- Selahattin Paşalı (born 1990), Turkish actor
- Selahattin Sağan (born 1961), Turkish wrestler
- Selahattin Seyhun (born 1999), Turkish football player
- Selahattin Taşdöğen (born 1951), Turkish actor
- Selahattin Ülkümen (1914–2003), Turkish diplomat who assisted Jews in WW2
- Selahattin Yiğit (born 1968), Turkish wrestler

== See also ==
- Dr. Selahattin Akçiçek Cultural Center
