= Carlos Miranda =

Spanish composer, pianist, conductor, and actor (1945–2016)

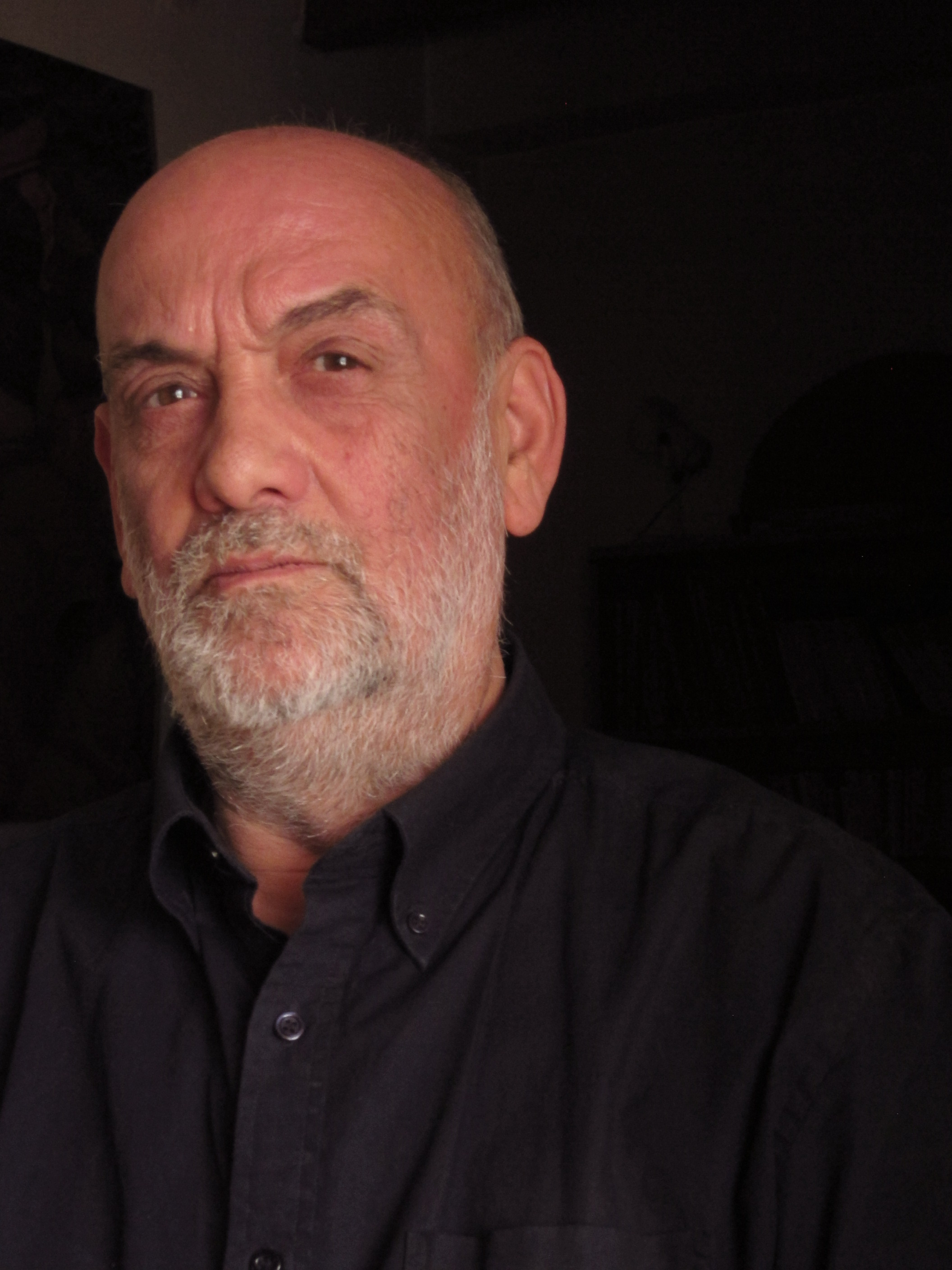
- Carlos Miranda in 2013
- Born: 17 January 1945; Santiago, Chile
- Education: The Royal College of Music, London
- Occupations: Music composer, pianist, conductor and actor

Luis Carlos Miranda Cordal (born Santiago, Chile, 17 July 1945), also known as Carlos Miranda, is a Spanish composer, pianist, conductor and actor.

== Life and career ==
He was born in Chile, where he studied at the Conservatorio Nacional de Música composition with Gustavo Becerra-Schmidt and piano with Flora Guerra. He moved to Italy and worked as apprentice in films by Franco Zeffirelli (Romeo and Juliet) and Pier Paolo Pasolini (Teorema). He then settled in London, initially working nights as accompanist to American cabaret singer Militia Battlefield (portrayed in Jana Bokova's 1975 documentary film of the same name, and days as pianist repetiteur at The Dance Centre (Covent Garden) for various dance teachers among which: Errol Addison, Matt Mattox, Brigitte Kelly and John O'Brien.

He won a British Council Scholarship to the Royal College of Music in London studying piano with Harry Platts, composition with John Lambert and conducting with Vernon Handley. After graduating, he joined the Rambert Dance Company (1974–78) as pianist and resident composer, playing and writing scores for both dance performances and concerts with the Mercury Ensemble.

In 1977 he wrote the music for the full-length dance-theatre work "Cruel Garden", choreographed by Christopher Bruce, scenario and direction by Lindsay Kemp. The piece, based on the life and death of Federico García Lorca, has since been staged by various dance companies in the UK, Germany and the USA. The BBC television adaptation, directed by Colin Nears, won the Prix Italia Music-1982.

His association with Lindsay Kemp began with his earliest creation for Rambert Dance Co., the recently revived ballet "The Parades Gone By". He then joined the Lindsay Kemp Company writing the music and collaborating in the creation of various dance-theatre productions that toured Europe, the Americas, Israel, Singapore, Japan and Australia: "A Midsummer Night's Dream", "Mr. Punch's Pantomime", "Duende, Poema Fantastico per F. Garcia Lorca", "The Big Parade" (Producciones Julio Alvarez), "Nijinsky il Matto" (Teatro Alla Scala, Milano), "Cinderella, a Gothic Operetta" (Cenicienta S.L), "Variété" (Susumu Matahira-Tate Corporation), "Dreamdances" (Italian tour 2001) and "Elizabeth I, the last dance"

Carlos Miranda has produced scores for movies directed by independent Spanish film-makers, among which: Celestino Coronado’s "Hamlet" (1977) and "A Midsummer Night's Dream" (1984), Manuel Huerga's "Gaudì" (1988), Félix Rotaeta's "The Pleasure of Killing" (1988) and "Chatarra" (1991).

In 1992, Miranda composed the music, and conducted the Ciutat de Barcelona Orchestra, for the Parade of Nations during the opening ceremony of the 1992 Summer Olympics. He also created the soundtrack for the official video of the Seville Expo '92.

In 1993 he conducted the Orquestra de Cambra Teatre Lliure in performances of his score for the full-length ballet "El Jardiner" for Compañía de Danza Gelabert Azzopardi. In 1997 he wrote the piece "Quell Inocente Figlio" for the BBC Radio 3 series "The Schubert Songbook". In 2004 he composed and recorded the music for multimedia dance spectacle "Glimpse" (Barcelona FORUM) collaborating with choreographer/dancer Cesc Gelabert and American media-dance filmmaker Charles Atlas. That year he also wrote the instrumental piece "Del Amor Insomne Noche" (City of London Festival) later recorded for BBC Radio 3 by the Galliard Ensemble Wind Quintet, with Lucy Wakeford (harp) and Colin Currie (marimba).

== Films as an actor ==
Among the films he has acted in: Velvet Goldmine (Todd Haynes – 1998), Mauvais Esprit (Patrick Alessandrin – 2003), The Feast of the Goat (Luis Llosa – 2005), Goya's Ghosts (Miloš Forman – 2006), Karol: The Pope, The Man (made for TV, Giacomo Battiato – 2006) and The Promise, (Terry George – 2016).

- The Assassination of Trotsky (1972) – Sheldon Harte
- Chronicle of a Death Foretold (1987)
- A Show of Force (1990) – Thug
- Havana (1990) – Inspector No. 1
- Captain Ron (1992) – Pirate
- Velvet Goldmine (1998) – Pianist
- Duplo Exilio (2001) – INS Agent 1
- The Feast of the Goat (2005) – Antonio Imbert Barrera
- Los Reyes: La verdadera historia de Buster y El Camaleón (2014) – Coronel

== Discography ==
- Carlos Miranda "A Midsummer Night's Dream", The Lindsay Kemp Co. CD- Fonè Records
- Carlos Miranda "The Big Parade", The Lindsay Kemp Co. CD- Fonè Records
- Carlos Miranda "Cinderella, a gothic operetta" CD- Miranda Records
- "Chilean Music of the 20th Century, Volumes VII and VIII", Luis Carlos Miranda, pianist

== Awards ==
- "Cruel Garden" Special Award 1979, Belgrade International Theatre Festival – BITEF
- "Dancers" (film directed by John Chesworth, Derek Hart) Special Prize for Music, Krakow Film Festival 1979
- "A Midsumer night's Dream" Special Award 1981, Belgrade International Theatre Festival – BITEF
- "Cruel Garden" Prix Italia Music 1982

== See also ==
- Carlos Miranda Interview, BBC Radio 3
- "Sogno di una notte di mezza estate" – archivio di 393 diapositive (Pino Addante, photographer)
- "Cruel Garden" in 50 Years in Dance
- René Amengual – Sonatina (1939), played by Luis Carlos Miranda, piano
- "Elizabeth I, the last dance" in Lorenzo Cutùli's sketches for the set
- "Glimpse" Portfolio
- Barcelona 1992 Olympic Ceremonies
- Barcelona 1992 Olympics, Spanish Team Parade
- Carlos Miranda portrait of the Chilean composer. Prato, 1983
