= Sheherezade Alam =

Pakistani-Canadian ceramist (1948–2022)

Sheherezade Alam (19 June 1948 – 19 May 2022) was a Pakistani-Canadian ceramist.

== Early life and education ==
Alam was born in 1948 in Lahore, Pakistan to Mahmoud Alam, a Pakistani former tennis player and his wife, Surayya. She had two brothers, Asad and Shaban. Brought up in Lahore, she completed her FA from its Kinnaird College. She went on to obtain her Bachelor of Fine Arts (BFA) in Design with a distinction in ceramics from Lahore's National College of Arts (NCA), where she studied under the country's first ceramist, Salahuddin Mian. She later became an artist-in-residence at Yale University. She taught at the NCA, as well as at Bilkent University (Ankara, Turkey).

== Personal life ==
In 1971, she married Zahoor ul Akhlaq (1941–1999), a painter, and the couple had two daughters, Jahanara (1974–1999) and Nurjahan (b. 1979). Zahoor and Jahanara were murdered in their home in Lahore in 1999 by a visiting acquaintance, Shahzad Butt, a roti merchant of the city. The killer was awarded death sentence by a court and the sentence was upheld by the Lahore High Court. An appeal is pending in the Supreme Court.

== Career ==
=== Shows ===
==== Group ====
- 1980: Sultan Art Gallery, Kuwait
- 1983: Group Show, British Council, Islamabad
- 1983: Group Show, Rohtas Gallery, Islamabad
- 1988: Joint exhibition, Yale University, New Haven, USA
- 1995 to 1999: Toronto Outdoor Art Exhibition (yearly)
- 2009: Group Show, Vogue Art Gallery, Islamabad.

==== Solo ====
- 1990: Chawkandi Arts, Karachi
- 1993: Ish Gallery, Ankara, Turkey
- 1994: Bismillah, Arcadia Art Gallery, Toronto, Ontario, Canada
- 1996: Clay Continuum, Gardiner Museum of Ceramic Art, Toronto, Ontario, Canada
- 2004: Offering Bowls, Arcadia Art Gallery, Toronto, Ontario, Canada
- 2005: Laali, Ceramic Installation, Private Residence, Lahore
- 2006: Laali, The garden of Imran Mir, Karachi
