= Djalal =

Djalal (Arabic: جلال) is a surname, especially an Indonesian form of Jalal. Notable people with the surname include:

- Dino Patti Djalal (born 1965), Indonesian diplomat and politician;
- Ghaffar Djalal (1882–1948), Iranian diplomat;
- Hasjim Djalal (1934–2025), Indonesian diplomat.
