= Jalal Haji Zawar =

Iranian Defence Ministry contractor (died 2019)

- Born: Iran
- Occupation: Employee of Iranian Defense ministry contractor

Jalal Haji Zawar was a former Iranian Defence Ministry contractor. He was executed for spying for the United States.

== Controversy ==
Zawar was condemned by Tehran’s military court after several meetings and was sentenced to death. He was executed at the Rajayi Shahr prison in Karaj, west of Iran's capital, Tehran.

Zawar's employment was terminated in 2010. He had been detained on account of espionage against the Ministry of Defense's intelligence unit. During the investigation, detectives found espionage tools in his home. Zawar confessed to his crime during his court meeting and claimed to have received money from the CIA in exchange for spying and transferring data and classified information from the Iranian military system to the CIA.

== Personal life ==
Zawar's ex-wife was convicted of "involvement in espionage" and was sentenced to 15-years in prison.

== See also ==
- Military intelligence
- Espionage
- Murtaja Qureiris
- Iran's 2018 prisoner swap proposal to the United States
- Walid Fitaihi
