= Salahuddin Ahmed =

Salahuddin Ahmed may refer to:

- A. F. Salahuddin Ahmed (1924–2014), Bangladeshi historian
- Salahuddin Ahmed (Cox's Bazar politician) (born 1962), Bangladesh Nationalist Party politician from Cox's Bazar
- Salauddin Ahmed (born 1967), Bangladeshi architect.
- Sheikh Salahuddin (cricketer) (1969–2013), Bangladeshi international cricketer
- Salahuddin Ahmed Mukti (born 1973), Bangladeshi politician
- Salahuddin Ahmad (1947/1948–2025), Bangladeshi jurist and Attorney General 2008–2009
- Salehuddin Ahmed (economist) (born 1949), governor of the Bangladesh Bank 2005–2009
- Salah Uddin Ahmed (1945/46–2026), Bangladesh Nationalist Party politician from Dhaka
- Salahuddin Ahmed (judge) (1912–?), Pakistani judge
- Salahuddin Ahmed (Chapai Nawabganj politician)
