= Jalal Jalal Shokouhi =

Iranian radiologist, writer and researcher (born 1950)

Jalal Jalal Shokouhi جلال جلال شکوهی
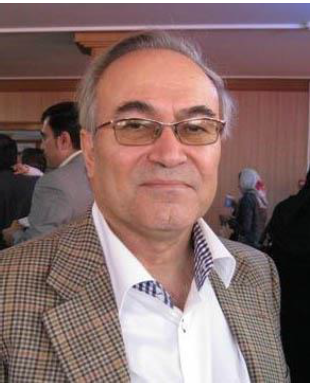
- Jalal Jalal Shokouhi
- Born: 1950 (age 75–76); Miandoab, Iran
- Known for: Chief of Iranian Society of Radiology, Studies on Saltman
- Medical career
- Profession: Radiology
- Awards: Top Doctor of Iranian Medical Council from ISR

Jalal Jalal Shokouhi (Persian: جلال جلال شکوهی; born 1950, Miandoab, West Azerbaijan) is an Iranian radiologist, writer and historical and cultural researcher. He is the chief of Iranian Society of Radiology and also the first person who made polymer samples of Saltman. He was one of the candidates for president election of Iranian Medical Council.

== Biography ==
Jalal Jalal Shokouhi was born in 1950 in Miandoab a city in West Azerbaijan province of Iran. He attended elementary school and high school there and then traveled to Mashhad to study as a general practitioner. In 1977 he graduated from Mashhad University of Medical Sciences and then continued his studies to his doctorate degree from Shahid Beheshti University of Medical Sciences.

After completing his academic educations in Iran, he also attended many courses such as Advanced Radiology, Ultrasound, MRI and intervention in Germany. He also earned his PhD degree in "Head and Neck" field.

Through his working years he taught as a professor in Shahid Chamran Hospital, Shahid Beheshti University of Medical Sciences, Islamic Azad University of Medical Science and also he cooperated with Loghman Hakim Hospital.

Jalal Shokouhi is now the chief of the Iranian Society of Radiology and years of activity in this field has made him a well-known figure in radiology science.

== Scientific and cultural activities ==
Activities of Jalal Jalal Shokouhi contain a wide range of medical to cultural ones. Besides decades in medical science and radiology, which is his special field, he also wrote a number of books in history and culture.

One of the most well-known activities of Jalal Shokouhi is his project in partnership with the Iranian Cultural Heritage, Handcrafts and Tourism Organization, National Museum of Iran and Zanjan Museum about Radiology and CT Scan of Saltman and also some crafts and Pottery, determining their antiquity and properties. This project started in 2005 and resulted in building polymer samples of Saltman's skull.

In this case he presented many articles in different conferences and made interviews in many TV programs as a science, anthropology and sociology expert in Iran and Japan, like "Saltman Documentary" directed by "Hassan Dehghan". Today, he also cooperates with Iran's Heritage Organization as an adviser in radiography.

Shokouhi also had done completed many projects as a radiologist. He is the chief of Iranian Society of Radiology and presented many papers in journals like "Ettelaat Elmi", "Biomedical Engineering" and "Radiology Management". He also cooperates with Iranian Medical jurisprudence in its commissions.

He founded Iranian Radiologists cooperative and has written a number of special journals and articles for IJR and Journal of Tehran University of Medical Sciences. he also published many articles on different applications of radiology.

Jalal Shokouhi also wrote a number of books in Radiology and Culture. "Radiography Made Simple" and "Orthopedic surgery and MRI" are two of his books which are also referred to by academics.

He was the manager of Iran Radiology Conference for several years and Middle East and Europe Conference on spinal cord, in 2007 and 2009 at Abu Dhabi and Kish Island. He was also selected as the premier doctor of Iranian Medical Council.

In terms of cultural activities, he published some books in history and travel literature. Moreover, he is the chief of Shokouhi's Foundation which publishes and revives old books and manuscripts.

Objection to Arresting Radiologists

At the end of January 2016, many radiologists demonstrated near the Iranian Ministry of Health to enquire about their rights as those active in this field. But the Iranian Ministry of Health did not answer to their demands and the police broke the demonstration apart and arrested some of them.

After that incident, Jalal Jalal Shokouhi as the chief of Iranian Society of Radiology, wrote a letter to the Iranian Ministry of Health and expressed his willingness to solve the problem using reason and conversation.

== Publications ==
- Context and Imagery of Neurosurgery by Armin Nowroozi, Printed in England
- Paradolia in Radiology
- Orthopedic Surgery and MRI
- Pathology in Radiology
- Radiology Instruments in IRAN
- Culture and Hygiene of Restrooms
- Non-Medical Usages of X-ray
- Review of "Fundamentals of Radiography"
- Textbook of Clinical Radiology
- Mirza Hassan Shokouhi
- Index of Turkish Handwrites in the World
- Sonography
- Dyes in Radiology
- Traffic Culture
- Write and Revive Maraghe's Old Notes
- Articles in French Annual Radiology magazine
- Pain Control in Interventional Radiology
- Cyst hydatid of heart and MRI, Talasemi in spinal cord; Shiraz Medical Magazine, ECR conference
- The history of Radiology in Iran; AIM
