= Salah El-Din El-Sahrawi =

Egyptian water polo player (1925–2008)

Personal information
- Nationality: Egyptian
- Born: 7 November 1925
- Died: 18 December 2008 (aged 83)

Sport
- Sport: Water polo

Salah El-Din El-Sahrawi (7 November 1925 – 18 December 2008) was an Egyptian water polo player. He competed in the men's tournament at the 1952 Summer Olympics.
