= Salahuddin Mian =

Pakistani artist

Salahuddin Mian (1938 – 28 February 2006) was Pakistan's first ceramic or pottery artist.

He was born Mian Salahuddin. According to Mian, his inspiration to become a ceramicist was because he was "born in the locality of potters in the town of Kasur."

== Early life ==
Mian was born in Kasur, Punjab, British India to an upper-middle-class Arain family of 10 children. His father, Mian Mohammad Rafi, was a landowner, farmer and member of the local council.

== Education ==
He graduated from Government School in Kasur. In 1958, he was enrolled at the National College of Arts (NCA), Lahore, graduating four years later in 1962. While there, he studied under the Japanese ceramist, Koichi Takita Sensei.

He was awarded a Fulbright Scholarship in 1965.

== Personality ==
He reportedly "had a complex personality, respected among his peers but [was] a loner". His father's murder deeply affected him. Shakir Ali, principal at the National College of Arts, Lahore, who used to take deep interest in his students, was delighted at the news that Mian Salahuddin had received the Fulbright Scholarship for a Ph.D degree in the United States. But when he suggested to Mian Salahuddin that he leave his artwork behind at NCA, Lahore, as he leaves for the United States, "Mian went berserk, smashing his pots in a rage until Shakir Ali and Adil [Salahuddin] stopped him". Shakir Ali then said, "Do what you like". Mian used to be very possessive of his artwork and used to get very nervous as the artwork was moved from one venue to the other.

== His work ==
Mian Salahuddin was a talented artist and produced pieces of art liked by many people. He referred to groups of similar pieces as "the families". His contemporary painters in Pakistan included Bashir Mirza and Adil Salahuddin.

== Teaching ==
He started his teaching career at National College of Arts (NCA) in 1963. Reportedly, as a teacher, he was a strict disciplinarian. He retired in 1998 as the head of the department.

=== Students ===
Amongst his students was Sheherezade Alam, Pakistan's first female ceramicist.

== Death ==
He died as a result of brain cancer on 28 February 2006.

== Exhibitions ==
- 1970: First solo exhibition, The Gallery, Karachi.
- 2008: Pottery Exhibition at the Indus Valley School of Art and Architecture, Karachi
