= Jörg Tscherner =

German modern pentathlete

Personal information
- Born: 14 August 1947 (age 78) Bad Düben, Germany

Sport
- Sport: Modern pentathlon

Jörg Tscherner (born 14 August 1947) is a German modern pentathlete. He competed for East Germany at the 1968 Summer Olympics.
