= Salah El-Din al-Tijani =

Egyptian Islamic Scholar

- Born: June 12, 1958 (age 68); Cairo, Egypt
- Education: Faculty of Medicine, Cairo University
- Occupations: Shaykh, Muhaddith, Mujtahid
- Title: Imam

Salah El-Din al-Tijani (born 12 June 1958) is an Egyptian hadith scholar and writer.

== Early life and career ==
Salah El-Din al-Tijani lives in Cairo, Egypt, where he operates a zawiya in the Embaba neighborhood.

Al-Tijani is a master of Sunni jurisprudence across the Maliki, Hanafi, Shafi'i, and Hanbali madhhabs.

He is a professor of medicine at Cairo's Faculty of Medicine Kasr Al Ainy as well as an orthopedic surgeon.

Some sources present genealogical information tracing his lineage to the Ahl al-Bayt, the family of the Islamic prophet Muhammad, through Imam al-Husayn ibn Ali. It also connects his lineage to Sidi Ahmad al-Tijani, the founder of the Tijaniyya Sufi order.

At-Tijani's official website lists chains of transmission (asanid), scholars, and religious authorizations (ijazat) associated with Islamic scholarship. These include fields such as hadith, Islamic jurisprudence, Quranic exegesis, and Quran recitatio.

Al-Tijani is the leader of International Tijaniya Association.

== Books ==
=== His official website lists more than 100 publications ===
Sources:

- Al-Kanz fi al-Masa'il al-Sufiyya (1998; second edition, 2008).
- Jawami' al-Kalim min Ahadith Sayyid al-'Arab wa-l-'Ajam (1999; second edition, 2000).
- An-Nujum as-Sa'ira fi al-Qira'at al-'Ashr al-Mutawatira (2000).
- Al-Maharib (2002).
- At-Tanzilat al-Ilahiyya.
- Taysir al-Wusul li-Anfas ar-Rasul.
- Al-Anfas min Kalam Sayyid an-Nas.
- Mawakib al-Hubb.
- The Fountain of Life (2021)
- An Outpouring of Love Paperback (2022)
- The Book of Tijani Litanies
- Kashf al-Ghuyum 'an Ba'd Asrar al-Qutb al-Maktum
