= Walter Toussaint =

German volleyball player (born 1938)

Personal information
- Nationality: German
- Born: 3 March 1938 (age 87); Leipzig, Germany

Sport
- Sport: Volleyball

Walter Toussaint (born 3 March 1938) is a German volleyball player. He competed in the men's tournament at the 1968 Summer Olympics.
