= Jalal Jamal Bin Thaneya =

Emirati activist

Jalal Jamal Majid Bin Thaneya Al Marri
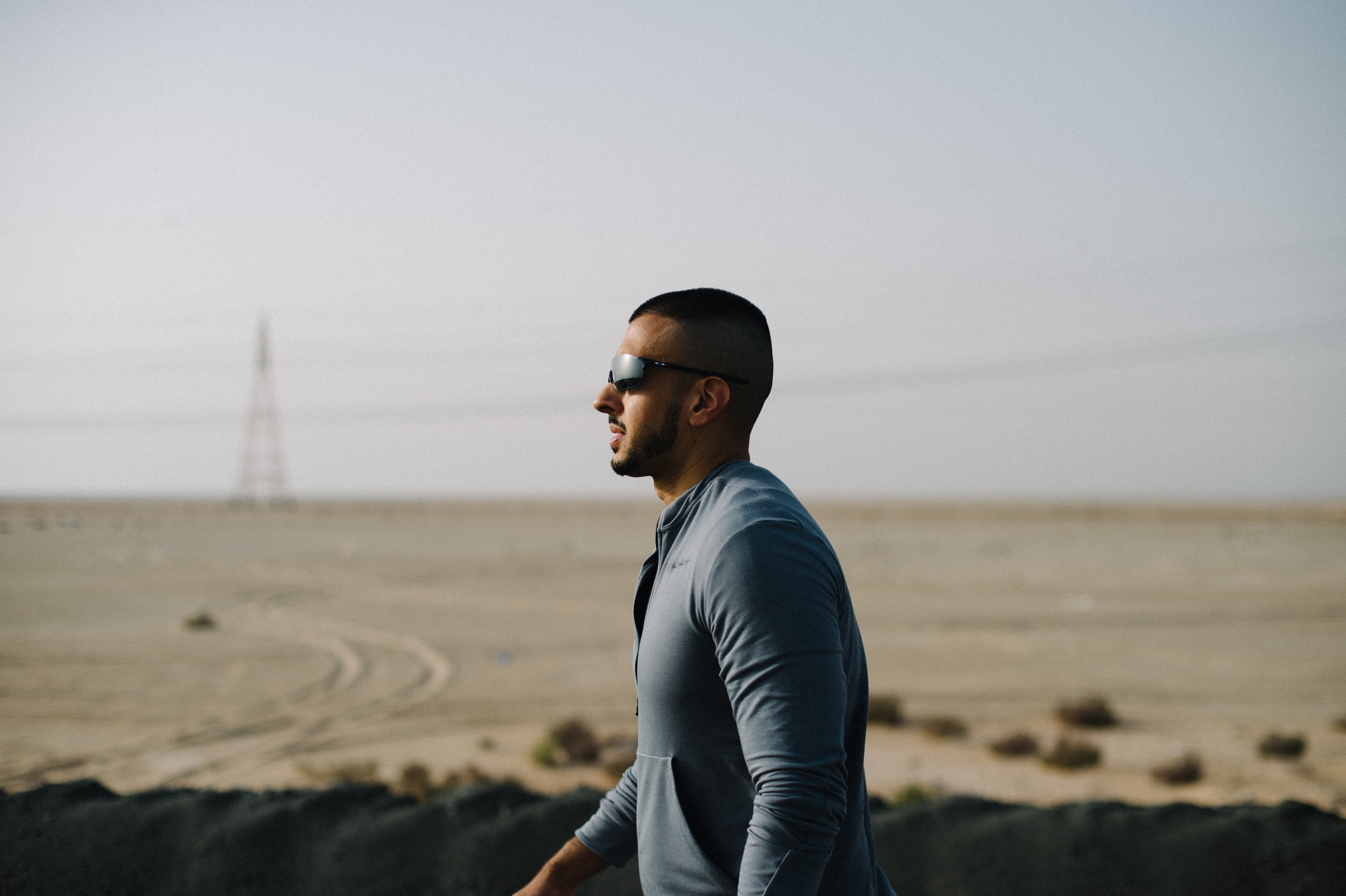
- Jalal Jamal Majid Bin Thaneya Al Marri
- Born: Jalal Jamal Majid Bin Thaneya Al Marri (جلال جمال بن ثنية المري); February 26, 1986 (age 40)
- Years active: 2007–present
- Known for: Charity, Campaign for Autism
- Notable work: Walk to Makkah, Cycling across Persian Gulf region
- Website: binthaneya.ae

Jalal Jamal Majid Bin Thaneya Al Marri (جلال جمال بن ثنية المري) (born February 26, 1986) is an Emirati activist from Dubai, United Arab Emirates. He is known for his movements and campaigns towards children and adults with special needs. Since 2006, he has been publicly fund-raising and campaigning to increase the awareness for people with special needs.

He has been involved in a number of long-distance walks, marathons and bicycle challenges throughout the Persian Gulf region, from 2011 onwards. Each challenge has focused generally on the topic of raising awareness and funds for children with special needs in the region.

Bin Thaneya's philanthropic work has received widespread praise across the region, in both United Arab Emirates and also Saudi Arabia. In 2012, he was notably praised on Twitter for his efforts by the Ruler of Dubai, Sheikh Mohammed bin Rashid Al Maktoum.

== Early life ==
Bin Thaneya studied at Middlesex University, where he gained a Bachelor of Arts degree in Human Resources and Business Studies.

== Campaigns for special needs ==
For the past 10 years he has trekked, cycled and climbed his way through a variety of challenges to raise funds for charitable organisations across the UAE. He is committed to supporting groups such as the Dubai Autism Centre and the Rashid Centre for the Disabled, and also encourages the rest of the UAE to support them.

You don't have to be challenged to represent or highlight circumstances and the challenges that society faces.

=== Walking across the Seven Emirates ===
In 2006, he travelled 500 km across the desert, mountain and urban landscape of the United Arab Emirates to raise awareness and funds for the Dubai Autism Centre. At the time, this centre for children and young people with autism was in desperate need of publicity and funding. Today, the centre is a large, thriving facility that is well known within the region.

=== Stair climbing 100 towers ===
In 2008, he stepped up to the vertical challenge of climbing the stairs of 100 skyscrapers in Dubai in aid of the Rashid Centre for the Disabled. Bin Thaneya completed the stairway in each building twice, totalling 100 stairways in some of Dubai's tallest towers, including Burj Al Arab and Shangri La Hotel and the Dubai World Trade Centre. Inspired by the Emirates Towers stair-climbing marathon, he tackled the stairs of buildings such as the Sheikh Rashid Tower over a 12-day period. During the 13-day gruelling derring-do, from January 20 to February 1, he scaled 8 to 10 tall buildings every day, on some days going up and down the towers from 9am, until midnight. Finally he had trotted up and down a staggering 85,000 steps.

=== Walking to the empty quarter ===
In 2009, he embarked in his next movement which saw him crossing the Empty Quarter (Rub’ Al Khali). This walk was in support of Dubai's Senses Centre, which treats children with disabilities. This tough walk spanned over 20 days averaging up to 60 km per day, enduring the vast expanse of sand between Oman and the UAE. His journey began from the Senses Centre in Jumeirah on December 26 at 8:30 am. From Dubai to Abu Dhabi along Sheikh Zayed Road, before heading down the long Hameem road to Liwa, trekking through the harsh terrain of the Empty Quarter to the Aradah Fort Umm Hism in the Empty Quarter.

=== The journey to Makkah ===
In December 2011, he decided to go on a pilgrimage to Mecca to perform Umrah and the annual Haj, following the foot steps of his ancestors. He started his pilgrimage walk from Al Ghuwaifat in Abu Dhabi to the city of Makkah in Saudi Arabia in aid of the Dubai Centre for Special Needs. This tough and enduring walk of 2000 kilometres took him 47 days to complete. He stopped halfway through his journey on the outskirts of Riyadh, Saudi Arabia, to be welcomed by the court of the governor, Sattam bin Abdulaziz Al Saud. He considers this walk to be his journey of a lifetime, which he had to walk the long, empty highways of Saudi Arabia, and cross the mountains wearing Ihram.

=== Cycling across the Persian Gulf region ===
In 2013, he undertook his longest distance challenge to date, when he began campaigning for a 5,000 km cycle challenge across the Persian Gulf countries. He cycled more than 5000 kilometres to raise awareness of the Al Jalila Foundation, a philanthropic organisation promoting medical education and research in the UAE. Bin Thaneya cycled the complete distance, starting in Oman's capital, Muscat. During his expedition, he crossed six separate countries, Oman, UAE, Qatar, Bahrain, Kuwait and Saudi Arabia. He finished the challenge in Saudi Arabia's capital, Jeddah.

=== Walking across the Seven Emirates ===
After a decade of his first walk on 2006, Bin Thaneya embarked on his next walk across the Seven Emirates through a new route. The aim of this mission was to bridge the gap between special needs and the rest of the community. Hampered by scorching heat, breakdown of support vehicles, scarce food, and dusty unpaved roads, over 14 days, he covered roughly 810 km.

== Burj Khalifa Vertical Marathon ==
Bin Thaneya applied to carry out a vertical marathon at the world's tallest building, the Burj Khalifa in 2008. The event would have taken place prior to his 2,000 km empty quarter walk. The plan was for him to climb the entire stairway of the Burj Khalifa from the base of the building up to the spire. When he reached the top, he would place the UAE flag on top of it upon completion of the tower.

He was unable to gain permission for the challenge.

== Personal life ==
Jalal is also an artist represented by the Empty quarter gallery located at the Dubai International financial center which hosts well-renowned artists. He has participated in local as well as international events. At the later half of 2011, Bin Thaneya was chosen to participate in London 2012 Olympics as a torch bearer.
