= Salahuddin Sumon =

Bangladeshi journalist and YouTuber

- সালাহউদ্দিন সুমন
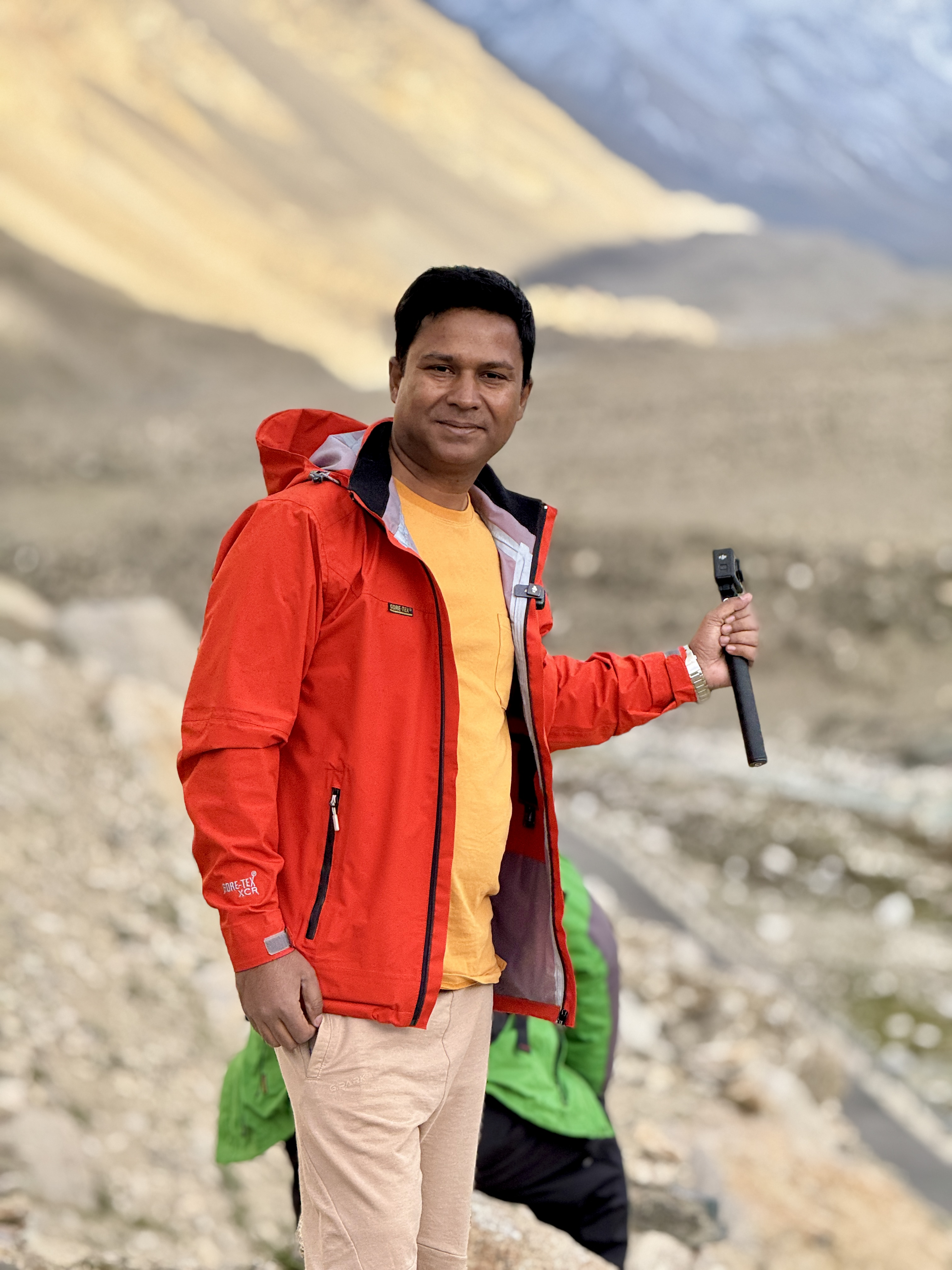
- Sumon in front of Everest Base Camp in Tibet 2025
- Born: 28 December 1984 (age 41); Bogra, Bangladesh
- Education: University of Rajshahi
- Occupations: Journalist; YouTuber; Influencer; Entrepreneur
- Years active: 2011–present
- Known for: YouTubing

YouTube information
- Channel: Salahuddin Sumon
- Genres: Travel; Digital Storytelling
- Subscribers: 3.3 million
- Views: 726 million
- Last updated: 13 August 2026

Abu Mohammad Salah uddin (better known as Salahuddin Sumon) (born 28 December 1984) is a Bangladeshi journalist and YouTube content creator known for his travel documentaries and digital storytelling. His work focuses on culture, history, and social life in different countries.

== Early life and education ==
Sumon was born on 28 December 1984 in Bogra District. His father is Md. Sekendar Ali and his mother is Meherun Nesa. He studied Mass Communication and Journalism at University of Rajshahi, where he completed both his bachelor's and master's degrees. He became involved in journalism during his university years and began reporting for national newspapers.

== Career ==
He began his professional career as a university correspondent for Daily Bhorer Kagoj. Later he worked as a divisional correspondent for Desh TV, covering news from Rajshahi Division. In 2011, he joined Somoy Television, where he worked for more than a decade as a special correspondent. During this period, he covered major national and international events. He also worked as a freelance broadcast journalist for BBC News Bangla.

In 2021, Sumon left television journalism and began working full-time as a digital content creator. He started publishing travel documentaries on YouTube and Facebook under his own name. His content combines journalistic research with travel stories, with a focus on cultural heritage and social issues. His travel videos have gained popularity among Bangla-speaking audiences in Bangladesh and abroad.

== Published book ==
- Bhagirothi Theke Burigonga, 2022

== Awards and achievements ==
- Best Travel Vlogger by The Bangladesh Monitor
- Best Travel Vlogger of the Year 2025 by Marvel Be With You – Marvel of Tomorrow.

== See also ==
- Nadir Nibras
