= Selahattin Baki =

Turkish businessman

- Born: Selahattin Baki; Istanbul, Turkey
- Occupation: Businessman

Selahattin Baki is a Turkish businessman.

== Business career ==
Baki is an advisor to Saudi Prince, Businessman and Billionaire Abdullah bin Musa'ed bin Abdulaziz Al Saud. From May 2001 to May 2005, Baki worked in Sales and Marketing for 'Antoine Makzume', an international sea transportation company. In March 2007 he was made an advisor to Prince Abdullah and in March 2009, Baki took on the role of Sales and Marketing in Nanotechnology for 'Saudi Environmental Projects Company'. In September 2013, Baki joined the board of Directors at Blades Leisure Ltd after Prince Abdullah bought at 50% share in Sheffield United; Baki soon revealed plans for Sheffield United to establish business ties with Saudi club Al-Hilal FC and Turkish club Fenerbahçe. In Summer 2014, Baki helped arrange a charity friendly match with Fenerbahçe to celebrate the 125th Anniversary of Sheffield United with money from the match going to help the victims of the Soma mine disaster in Turkey. On 10 November 2014, Sheffield United announced that Baki had been appointed the club's International Football Co-ordinator with the duty to "utilise global contacts, assist in identifying overseas football talent opportunities and to bring in international sponsorships for the attention of the Club's management".

== Hooliganism accusations ==
Baki is a lifelong Fenerbahçe fan. In Baki's early life, he was a football ultra and a senior member of the notorious football firm associated with Fenerbahçe called 'Kill For You'. In November 2013, Sheffield United defended Baki's past with Sheffield United PLC Director James Phipps stating "The prince is aware that Mr Baki is a fervent supporter of Fenerbahce and that, in younger days, the fervency of his support may have overcome his better judgement... Indeed, Mr Baki has built a reputation as a well-regarded, law-abiding businessman and has earned his place as a trusted advisor to His Royal Highness".
