= Eckhard Wallossek =

German field hockey player (born 1944)

Personal information
- Nationality: German
- Born: 25 September 1944 (age 81) Nimptsch, Germany (now Niemcza, Poland)

Sport
- Sport: Field hockey

Eckhard Wallossek (born 25 September 1944) is a German field hockey player. He competed in the men's tournament at the 1968 Summer Olympics.
