= Jalal Sheikh Naji =

Iraqi Kurdish Politician

Head of the Ajansi Zanyari
- Incumbent
- Assumed office March 2022

Personal details
- Born: 1968 (age 57–58) Kirkuk, Iraq
- Party: Patriotic Union of Kurdistan

Military service
- Battles/wars: Iraq War; ISIS

Jalal Sheikh Naji (Kurdish: جەلال شێخ ناجی), (Arabic: جلال شيخ ناجي) known as Sheikh Jalal (Kurdish: شێخ جەلال) (born 1968 in Kirkuk Governorate, Iraq), is an Iraqi Kurdish politician and current Head of the Ajansi Zanyari (Parastin u Zanyari), and Member of Leadership Council Patriotic Union of Kurdistan (PUK). Sheikh Jalal was a leading figure in the fight against terror especially in the fight against ISIS.

== Political and Military career ==
from 2010 the General Director of intelligence Ministry of Peshmarga (KRG), and a member of Kurdistan Region Security Council, in 2014 Director of intelligence Peshmerga agency (PIA) (Forces 70, Ministry of Peshmerga), and a member of the Supreme Command Council of the Kurdistan Peshmerga Forces, 2019 Member of Leadership Council Patriotic Union of Kurdistan (PUK), in 2021 Commander of the Secretariat Forces Command of President Mam Jalal. In 2022 Head of the Parastin and Zanyari / Zanyari Agency.

== Personal life ==
Sheikh Jalal is married and a father of two sons, He lives in Sulaymaniyah Governorate, Iraq. and Iraqi nationality.
