= Dietmar Seiz =

German water polo player

Personal information
- Nationality: German
- Born: 6 December 1942 (age 82); Stuttgart, Germany

Sport
- Sport: Water polo

Dietmar Seiz (born 6 December 1942) is a German water polo player. He competed for the West German team in the men's tournament at the 1968 Summer Olympics, placing 10th.
