= Helmut Rabis =

German field hockey player

Personal information
- Nationality: German
- Born: 14 March 1949 (age 77) Braunsbedra, Soviet occupation zone of Germany

Sport
- Sport: Field hockey

Helmut Rabis (born 14 March 1949) is a German former field hockey player. He competed in the men's tournament at the 1968 Summer Olympics.
