= Hans-Dietrich Sasse =

German field hockey player (born 1940)

Personal information
- Nationality: German
- Born: 21 July 1940 (age 86) Marienberg, Germany

Sport
- Sport: Field hockey

Hans-Dietrich Sasse (born 21 July 1940) is a German former field hockey player. He competed in the men's tournament at the 1968 Summer Olympics.
