= Jürgen Kessel =

German volleyball player (born 1937)

Personal information
- Nationality: German
- Born: 5 September 1937 (age 87); Berlin, Germany

Sport
- Sport: Volleyball

Jürgen Kessel (born 5 September 1937) is a German volleyball player. He competed in the men's tournament at the 1968 Summer Olympics.
