= Maritta Bauerschmidt =

East German gymnast

- Bauerschmidt in 1966

Personal information
- Born: 23 March 1950 (age 76) Waldheim, East Germany
- Height: 1.58 m (5 ft 2 in)
- Weight: 43 kg (95 lb)

Sport
- Sport: Artistic gymnastics
- Club: SC Leipzig
Medal record
Representing East Germany
Olympic Games
Bronze medal – third place	1968 Mexico City	Team

Maritta Bauerschmidt (later Grießig, born 23 March 1950) is a retired German artistic gymnast. She competed at the 1968 Summer Olympics and won a bronze medal with the East German team. Her best individual achievement was eighth place on the balance beam.

After 1970 she also competed nationally in rhythmic gymnastics. A trained chemist she had a second degree in physical education from the Deutsche Hochschule für Körperkultur, and worked as a coach first in Budapest and then in Berlin.

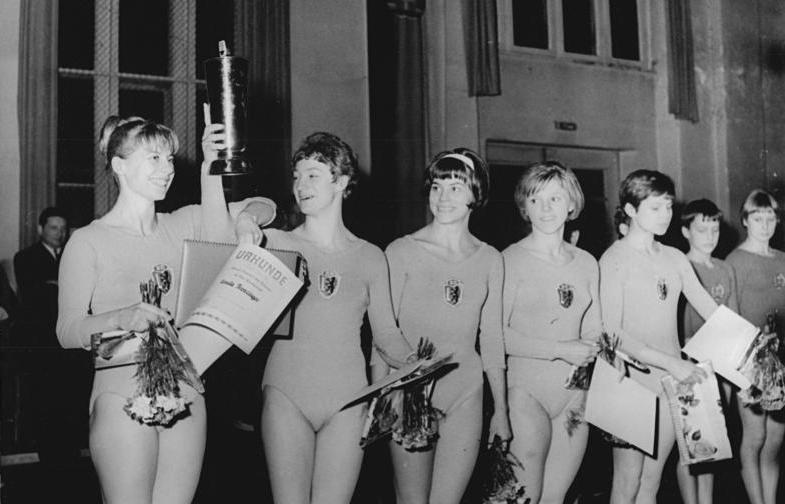
Bauerschmidt (far right) in 1966
