= Ahmed Galal =

Ahmed Galal or Ahmad Galal may refer to:

== People ==
- Ahmed Galal (politician) (born 1948), Egyptian politician
- Ahmed Galal (director) (1897–1947), Egyptian film director
