= Abubakr Ben Ishmael Salahuddin =

American religious writer

Abubakr Ben Ishmael Salahuddin is an American religious writer.

He was formerly an Ahmadi and wrote many articles for the Ahmadi magazine Review of Religions, as well as two books promoting Ahmadi beliefs. The Afrocentric Myth or Islam, an appeal to Ahmadi beliefs from the perspective of a former "Black Cultural Nationalist" and Black Muslim, and Saving the Savior around the Ahmadi conception of Jesus and related teachings on the Roza Bal tomb in Kashmir. In 2003, he repudiated Islam and converted to the Baháʼí Faith.

Publications

- The Afrocentric Myth or Islam: The Liberator of the American People, 1995
- Saving the Savior - Did Christ Survive the Crucifixion?, 2001
