= Aly El-Shafei =

Egyptian academic

Aly El-Shafei is an Egyptian academic. He is professor for Mechanical Engineering at Cairo University in Egypt. He is an expert on rotordynamics, machinery diagnostics and vibration analysis.

== Education ==
El-Shafei holds a bachelor's and master's degree in mechanical engineering from Cairo University. He earned a Ph.D. from the Massachusetts Institute of Technology (M.I.T.) in mechanical engineering.

== Career ==
From 1988 until 1990 he was assistant professor at the University of South Florida in Tampa, USA. From 1994 until 1997 he was the technical director of Ezz Group, a steel manufacturer. From 1998 until 2008 he was chairman for RITEC. From 2006 until 2008 he was assistant minister for technology development at the Ministry of Scientific Research. From 2008 until 2011 he was executive director of the Science and Technology Development Fund. From 2011 until 2014 he was chairman of the Mechanical Design and Production department at Cairo University.

El-Shafei also is a consultant to industry. He worked with companies like Assix International (USA), MTU (Germany), Mannesmann Demag (Germany), General Electric (USA), BAPETCO, SUCO and AOI (Egypt).

El-Shafei is known for his work on Squeeze Film Dampers. He is also known for his technology for the control of rotating machinery vibration and has three US patents in his name. In July 2017 El-Shafei won the Innovation Prize for Africa for his invention SEMAJIB (Smart Electro-Mechanical Actuator Journal Integrated Bearing). His invention boosts the performance of energy-generating turbines so the costs to produce power are reduced. The invention also reduces the need for regular maintenance. Siemens and General Electric (GE) both expressed interest in the invention.

He has written more than 80 papers on machinery diagnostics and rotordynamics. They were published in international journals and conferences.

== Awards ==
- 2009: European Union's Research, Development and Innovation Programme
- 2013: Egypt's Science and Technology Development Fund
- 2017: Innovation Prize for Africa
