= Adil Salahuddin =

Pakistani stamp designer

Aadil Salahuddin (born 1944 in Delhi) is Pakistan's foremost stamp designer, with over 2,000 stamp designs to his name. Of these, 400 have been printed including nearly 50 for other countries of the world.

== Early life and education ==
Adil Salahuddin was born in 1944 at Delhi, British India. His parents moved to Lahore, Pakistan when he was two years old. He joined the National College of Arts (NCA), Lahore in 1962, graduating in 1965 in miniature painting. He was a contemporary of, amongst others, Bashir Mirza, Salahuddin Mian and Ahmed Khan. He attended this art college in Lahore without telling his parents. At that time, he let them think that he was studying to be an engineer. He was guided and taught by the so-called 'father of modern painting in Pakistan', Shakir Ali, the principal of NCA at that time, and Haji Mohammad Sharif, another miniaturist and well-known artist of Pakistan.

== Career ==
Adil Salahuddin used to collect and study postage stamps as a hobby, when he was a child. In 1965, he was invited by fellow artist Bashir Mirza to move to Karachi where that artist had already opened up a new art gallery.

=== Designer ===
He was employed between 1967 and 2002, by Pakistan Security Printing Corporation in its design department in Karachi. It was during this period that he designed these stamps. This corporation was responsible for designing Pakistan's currency notes, postage stamps and cheque books for banks. He retired from this job in 2002 after 35 years of service.

During his career, Adil Salahuddin has done sculptures, portraits, paintings and calligraphy besides doing miniature art. He is best known for designing hundreds of postage stamps for the Pakistan Post.

Salahuddin believes that art must be protected and preserved. So he has donated his collection of 200 albums of postage stamps from 116 countries to the State Bank of Pakistan Museum & Art Gallery.

== Awards and recognition ==
- Pride of Performance Award by the President of Pakistan in 1987
- In 1986, he was declared the best designer in the Economic Cooperation Organization (ECO) countries – (Iran, Pakistan and Turkey) and awarded a gold medal at the exhibition, ECOPHILEX '86
- Sitara-i-Imtiaz (Star of Excellence) Award by the President of Pakistan (2010)
