= Jalal Abdul Carim Sahib =

Jalal Haji Abdul Carim Sahib (1865-1939) was an Indian Businessman. He started his career with a humble beginning and went on to become a tycoon of the leather industry managing an industrial empire which is unparalleled till date. He played a key role in the Transformation of Leather Industry in South India and is popularly known as the "Leather King"

== Career ==
He was the founding senior partner of M/s. Roshan N.M.A Carim Omer & Co., a large company in the tanning process.

Known as the "Leather king", he owned and managed 27 tanneries in India and over 100 Raw Skin purchasing centers throughout India, Tanning bark and Myrobalam. There were branches at Rangoon, Mandalay, Singapore, Surabaya and sales branches as far as Japan and England.

He started the Roshan Motor Company importing cars in lieu of the balance of payment and made huge profits.

The book "Madras Tercentenary Commemoration Volume" issued by Madras to celebrate 300 years of Madras City provides a mention of the company M/s. Roshan N.M.A Carim Oomer & Co along with the founder Jalal Abdul Carim Sahib and their expertise and domination in the leather field.

Jalal Abdul Carim Sahib was one of the first founding member of the Committee of Southern India Skin and Hide Merchants Association from 1917 to 1929 and became Honorary Treasurer in 1929.

== Philanthropy ==
Being Endowed with a charitable disposition created a trust for helping the poor without any distinction of caste and creed. The Trust is active till date.

He also founded the Jalalia Madarsa to impart religious education, Jalalia Elementary School for secular education and Jalalia Dawakhana for Free supply of medicine to the poor/needy in and around Ambur. He also built housing colonies with Marginal Rents for people in and around Ambur.

He evinced keen interest in Education and was the President of Bakiyathus Salihath, Arabic college, Vellore meeting the total expense of the college. He was a patron of Madrasah as-Sawlatiyah in Mecca. He was the first General Secretary of Ambur Muslim Educational Society, and donated land on which stands the Mazhar Uloom Higher Secondary School for boys besides an extensive playground was also endowed by him. He has also donated vast land for the Jamia Mosque, Idd-Ga, Nilkekolli Mosque and Chowk Mosque at Ambur. Most of the institutions at Ambur are beneficiaries of his philanthropy.

Jalal Abdul Carim Sahib had a pivotal hand towards development of Periament Mosque in Chennai.

He continues to be evergreen in the minds of people for his selfless behavior and his many contributions remain etched in memories of people not only in Ambur but everywhere till date.

== Personal life ==
He was born in 1865 at Ambur, son of Jalal Mohammed Ibrahim Sahib and died in October 1939. An eminent benefactor of the leather industry and an illustrious leather King.
