= Jalal Khoury =

- جلال خوري
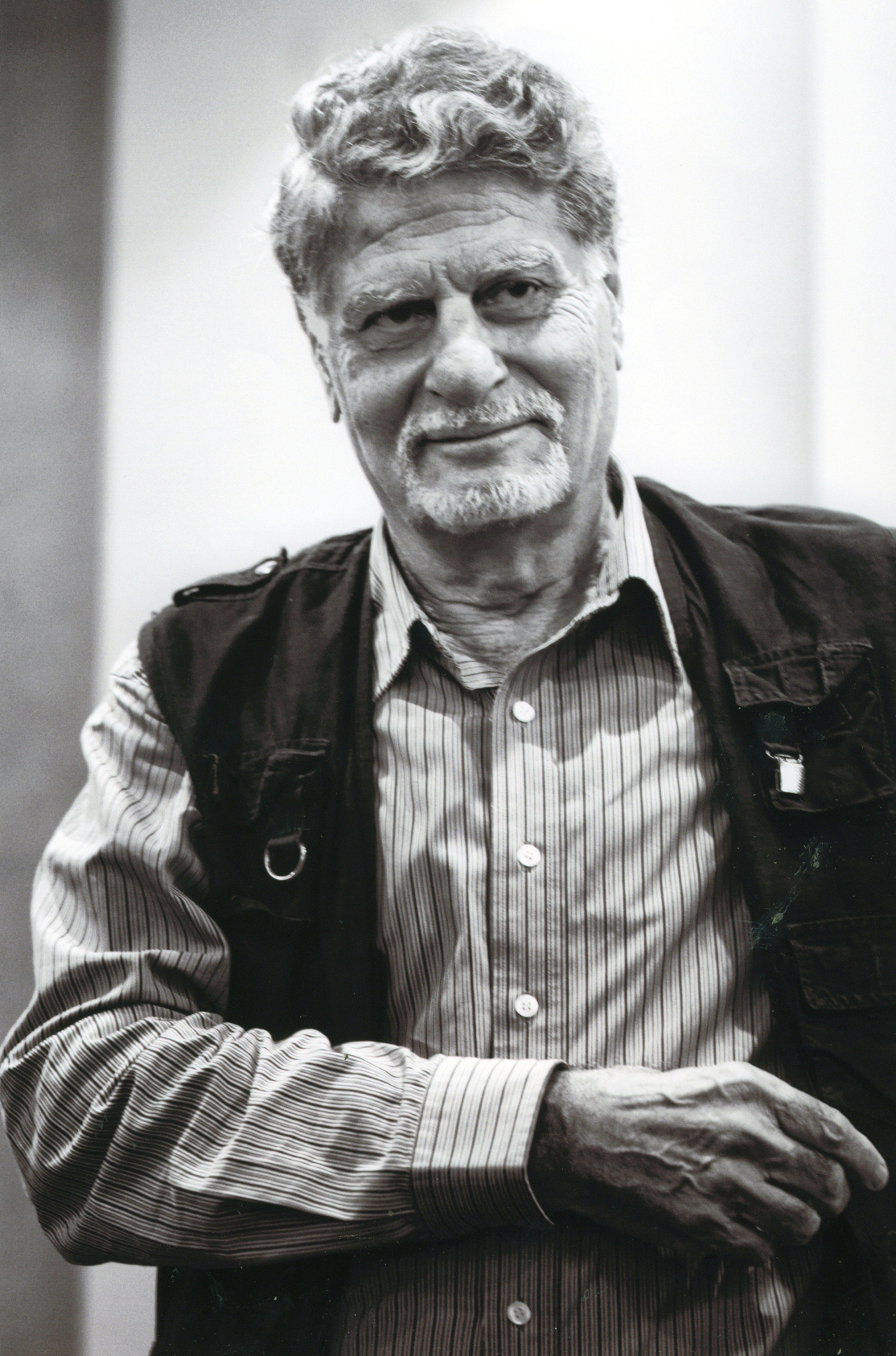
- Khoury in 2010.
- Born: 28 May 1933
- Died: 02 December 2017 (aged 84); Beirut
- Occupations: Playwright, Theatre Director
- Years active: 1956 - 2017
- Awards: Chevalier des Arts et des Lettres Order of the Cedar and Order of Merit on the 4th of December 2017 by the president of the Republic of Lebanon

Jalal Khoury (born in Beirut on 28 May 1933 – died on 3 December 2017) was a Lebanese playwright, theatre director, comedian and artistic editor.

== Career ==
Khoury is the first Lebanese playwright to be translated and performed internationally, his works are translated into German, English, Armenian, Iranian and French. His play "Al Rafiq Segean" ran for two consecutive seasons at the Volkstheater Rostock. Known for being the political theatre promoter in the 1960s Lebanon, Khoury is also an ethnoscenologist. He participated in several colloquiums in Paris and Mexico about Ethnoscenology, a new discipline that he represented in Lebanon. Khoury is also the author of several papers on theatre and arts, in French and Arabic, published in Lebanon and abroad, as well as an amount of scenic adaptations and theory critical writings in French and Arabic, featured in several periodicals and catalogues.

== Death ==
Jalal Khoury died in his home on December 2, 2017 because of a sudden heart attack.

== Biographical entries ==
- Artistic French editor (Le soir, L'Orient Littéraire, Magazine...) in the 1960s.
- Starts his theatre career in 1962 at the francophone college theater in the frame of the École supérieure des lettres (Centre universitaire d'études dramatiques - C.U.E.D.).
- Starts his directing career in 1964 with Bertolt Brecht "The Visions of Simone Machard".
- Teaches theatre at the Lebanese University (The Fine Arts Faculty) from 1968 until 1975.
- Founder and president of the Lebanese center of the International Theatre Institute (Unesco annex) from 1969 until 1984.
- President of the International Theatre Institute Permanent Committee of the Third-World from 1973 until 1977.
- Teaches theatre (theory and practice) and script writing at the Saint Joseph University (Institut d'Etudes scéniques, audiovisuelles et cinématographiques) from 1988 until 2012.
- Chairman of the Theatre Department of the Saint Joseph University (Institut d'Etudes scéniques, audiovisuelles et cinématographiques) from 1988 until 1999.
- Taught Scenic-arts for the Masters Students of the Saint Joseph University (Event planning Masters) until 2017
