= Salah Eddin Zaimeche Al-Djazair =

Dr. Salah Eddin Zaimeche Al-Djazairi
- Occupation: Historian

Academic background
- Education: University of Manchester

Academic work
- Discipline: History of Civilization, Science and Islam

Salah Eddin Zaimeche Al-Djazairi, commonly referred to as Dr. Salah Zaimeche or S. E. Al-Djazairi, is an academic and author specializing in the history of civilization, science, and Islam.

== Career and research ==
Zaimeche is currently an independent researcher and writer. Zaimeche was previously a researcher in the Department of Geography at the University of Manchester, and before that, a lecturer and researcher at the University of Constantine in Algeria for ten years. Zaimeche has also worked at the University of Manchester Institute of Science and Technology.

Zaimeche has been published in many academic journals, on topics including environmental degradation and North Africa. Zaimeche is a contributor to encyclopedias including Encyclopædia Britannica. Zaimeche is the author of six books, all of them about the history of Islam.

Journals that Zaimeche has been published in include Middle Eastern Studies, The Journal of North African Studies, and The Geographical Journal, among others.

== Published books ==
- The Hidden Debt to Islamic Civilisation (Bayt Al-Hikma Press; Manchester, 2005)
- The Golden Age and Decline of Islamic Civilisation (Bayt Al-Hikma Press; Manchester, 2006)
- A Short History of Islam (The Institute of Islamic History; Manchester, 2006)
- The Crusades (The Institute of Islamic History; Manchester, 2007)
- The Myth of Muslim Barbarism and its Aims (Bayt Al-Hikma Press; Manchester, 2007)
- The History of Islam (MSBN Books, 2015)
- The Great Turks (MSBN Books, 2015)
- The Long War (MSBN Books, 2015)
- Decisive Victories: Gallipoli, Skarya, Dumlupinar (MSBN Books, 2015)
- The Golden Age and Decline of Islamic Civilisation (MSBN Books, 2015)
- The Crusades, new Edition in 2 volumes (MSBN Books, 2015)
- Libya War of Independence (1911–1932) (MSBN Books, 2015)
- Barbary Pirates: Myths, Lies, Propaganda (MSBN Books, 2015)
- Muslim Decisive Victories (MSBN Books, 2015)
- French Invasion – Algerian Resistance (MSBN Books, 2015)
- Great Muslim Army Commanders (MSBN Books, 2016)
- The First Caliphs (MSBN Books, 2016)
- The Myths of Islamic Barbarism And Its Aims (MSBN Books, 2016)
- The West, Islam, Barbarism, and Civilisation (MSBN Books, 2018)
- Our Civilisation (MSBN Books, 2019)
- Islam in China (MSBN Books, 2019)
- The Destruction of the Environment in/of the Muslim World (MSBN Books, 2019)
- French Colonisation of Algeria: 1830–1962 — Lies, Myths and Historians (MSBN Books, 2022)
- Algerian War of Liberation 1954–1962 — Wilaya 2, El Milia Region, by Some Participants (MSBN Books, 2023)
- Algerian War of Liberation 1954–1962 — Myths and Lies (MSBN Books, 2024)
- The Destruction of the Environment in/of the Muslim World, new Edition (MSBN Books, 2024)
- The Ottomans: Their Rise, Accomplishments, Decline, And Their Historians (MSBN Books, 2024)
