= Klaus Träumer =

German hockey player

Personal information
- Nationality: German
- Born: 27 January 1940 (age 86) Dresden, Germany

Sport
- Sport: Field hockey

Klaus Träumer (born 27 January 1940) is a German field hockey player. He competed in the men's tournament at the 1968 Summer Olympics.
