= Salahud-Din Bakhtiar =

Sultan Salahud-Din Bakhtiar
- Sultan of Sulu
- Reign: c. 1649/50 – 1680
- Predecessor: Sultan Muwallil Wasit I
- Successor: Sultan 'Amir Shah
- Born: Unknown; Sulu Sultanate
- Died: 1680; Sulu Sultanate
- House: Maharajah Adinda
- Father: Sultan Muwallil Wasit I
- Mother: Pg Tuan Baloca
- Religion: Sunni Islam

Sultan Salahud-Din Bakhtiar (also spelled Salah ud-Din Bakhtiar) was the 11th Sultan of the Sulu Sultanate, reigning from approximately 1649 or 1650 until his death in 1680. He was known to Spanish authorities as Pangiran Bactial and to Dutch officials as Pangiran Batticale.

== Early life ==
Salahud-Din Bakhtiar was the son of Sultan Muwallil Wasit I. Due to his father's advanced age and the number of his father's followers, he did not ascend to the throne until around 1650, even though his father had effectively stepped down earlier.

== Reign ==
During his reign, Sultan Salahud-Din Bakhtiar was involved in regional politics, including interactions with neighboring sultanates and colonial powers. He was a contemporary of Sultan Kudarat of Maguindanao, and their reigns overlapped during a period of significant political activity in the region.

== Succession and legacy ==
Upon his death in 1680, Sultan Salahud-Din Bakhtiar appointed three temporary sultans to govern due to the young age of his heir. These were Sultan 'Amir Shah, Sultan Nûr ul-'Azam, and Sultan Al Haqunu Ibn Wali ul-Ahad, who ruled successively from 1680 to 1685.
