= Ahmed Zein El-Abidin =

Egyptian fencer

Personal information
- Full name: Ahmed Hazem Zein El Abedin
- Nickname: Hazem
- Nationality: Egyptian
- Born: 17 June 1943 (age 83) Cairo, Egypt

Sport
- Sport: Fencing
- Club: Egyptian Fencing Club
- Team: Egyptian National Team

Ahmed Zein El-Abidin (Arabic: احمد زين العابدين; born 17 June 1943) is an Egyptian former épée and foil fencer. He competed at the 1960 and 1968 Summer Olympics. At the 1960 Games, he represented the United Arab Republic.
