= Murtaja Qureiris =

Saudi Arabian activist

- Born: 24 October 2000 (age 26); Qatif, Eastern Province, Saudi Arabia
- Years active: 2014–present

Murtaja Qureiris (Arabic: مرتجى قريريص Murtajā Qurayrīṣ; born 24 October 2000) is a Saudi Arabian activist and member of the minority Shia. Qureiris was accused by the Saudi Government of joining a "terror group" and "sowing sedition", and was arrested in September 2014, when he was 13. According to The Guardian, he has been periodically held in solitary confinement. The Saudi authorities have not publicly commented on any details about his case, although in 2018, Saudi prosecutors suggested that they would pursue the death penalty. In June 2019, Amnesty International asked Saudi Arabia to rule out the death penalty for Qureiris and other teenagers who were arrested in 2014.

== Background ==
According to Amnesty International, Saudi Arabia is among the top five countries in the world in executions. At least 139 people were executed by the Saudi government in 2018. In April 2019, 37 people accused of terrorism were executed in Riyadh, central Qasim Province, and Eastern Province, the latter being home to a significant Shia minority.

In response to a 2017 inquiry from the United Nations High Commissioner for Human Rights, the Saudi government stated that the death penalty "can only be imposed for the most serious offenses and subject to the strictest controls." Saudi executions have been condemned by the United Nations and human rights groups. Reprieve has argued that Crown Prince Mohammed bin Salman should be held accountable.

The European Saudi Organisation for Human Rights found that Qureiris is a member of Shia minority. CNN reported that if Qureiris is executed, he would be the fourth minor prisoner to be executed in 2019 for crimes allegedly committed before age 18. Among the 37 executed in April 2019, two were executed for crimes committed as a minor.

Amnesty International has claimed that Saudi authorities are using the death penalty "as a weapon to crush political dissent." Amnesty International has followed Qureiris's case over his five-year imprisonment, and found that Qureiris was jailed in solitary confinement and was tortured for a month near the beginning of his captivity.

The Saudi government executed at least 110 people since the beginning of 2019, and the 37 killed in April constituted the largest mass execution in Saudi Arabia since 2016. According to the World Report from Human Rights Watch in 2019, Saudi Arabia executed 139 people in 2018, with most of the accused killed for alleged murder or drug crimes, with 54 being killed for other crimes.

== Arrest ==
Qureiris was arrested at age 13 for a crime committed when he was 10. He was accused of taking part in anti-Saudi government protests during 2011, and also of throwing Molotov cocktails at a police station after his brother was killed by Saudi forces in a protest in 2011. CNN published a video that showed Qureiris leading a group of children at a bike protest in 2011. According to the CNN report, Qureiris denied the charges and said he was forced to confess under torture. When he was arrested by the Saudi government, he became the youngest recorded political prisoner in Saudi Arabia. Amnesty International claimed that Qureiris was moved to a Mabahith prison in al-Dammam, which meant that he was 16 when sent to an adult prison.

Qureiris was born to a family of political activists in Qatif. His older brother, Ali Qureiris, was killed during a protest in 2011. The Saudi border police arrested Qureiris while he was traveling with his family to Bahrain in 2014. Amnesty International claimed that Qureiris was denied access to a lawyer until his first court session in August 2018. His first court session was held at Saudi Arabia's Specialized Criminal Court, a court that is only used for political charges.

According to international law, the death penalty is forbidden for persons under age 18. Lynn Maalouf, Amnesty International's Middle East research director, has claimed that Saudi Arabia actively uses the death penalty for minors. Human rights groups also take issue with Saudi Arabia's use of beheading as a means for punishment.

The European Saudi Organisation for Human Rights said that the Saudi public prosecutor's office charged Qureiris for participating in anti-Saudi government protests and sentenced him to death.

== Reactions ==
The Embassy of Saudi Arabia in Washington, D.C. has not commented on Qureiris's case.

Lynn Maalouf, Amnesty International's Middle East research director, said that "The international community [...] must take a public stand on these cases and demand that the Saudi authorities end their use of the death penalty".

Maya Foa, director of Reprieve, said "the execution of children is forbidden in international law, but the Saudi government is trying to show its impunity to the world by beheading prisoners and people."

== See also ==
- Mustafa al-Darwish
- Walid Fitaihi
