= Reinhart Sasse =

German field hockey player (born 1943)

Personal information
- Nationality: German
- Born: 23 September 1943 (age 82) Marienberg, Germany

Sport
- Sport: Field hockey

Reinhart Sasse (born 23 September 1943) is a German former field hockey player. He competed in the men's tournament at the 1968 Summer Olympics.
