= Ludger Weeke =

German water polo player

Personal information
- Nationality: German
- Born: 25 April 1949 (age 77) Hamm, Germany

Sport
- Sport: Water polo

Ludger Weeke (born 25 April 1949) is a German water polo player. He competed at the 1968 Summer Olympics, the 1972 Summer Olympics and the 1976 Summer Olympics.
