= Jalal Qanuni =

Jalal Qanuni (Persian: جلال قانونی) was a prominent Iranian musician and master of the Persian classical music and Dashtestani folkloric music.

== Life ==
He was born in Shiraz in 1900. His father, Rahim Qanuni was a master qanun (trapezoidal zither) player who re-introduced this instrument into Persia. After his death Jalal replaced him as the most renowned qanun player in Iran. He became master performer of the Persian modal system Dastgah. He created his own group and led an ensemble with three other musicians, namely Jalal Aqabala, Latif Pejman, and Manuchehr Shirazi. Their musical work was much appreciated by the late Shah of Iran when he routinely visited Shiraz.
