= Heinz Kleimeier =

German water polo player

Personal information
- Nationality: German
- Born: 1 October 1941 (age 84) Hamm, Germany

Sport
- Sport: Water polo

Heinz Kleimeier (born 1 October 1941) is a German water polo player. He competed in the men's tournament at the 1968 Summer Olympics.
