= Karl-Heinz Kutschke =

East German modern pentathlete

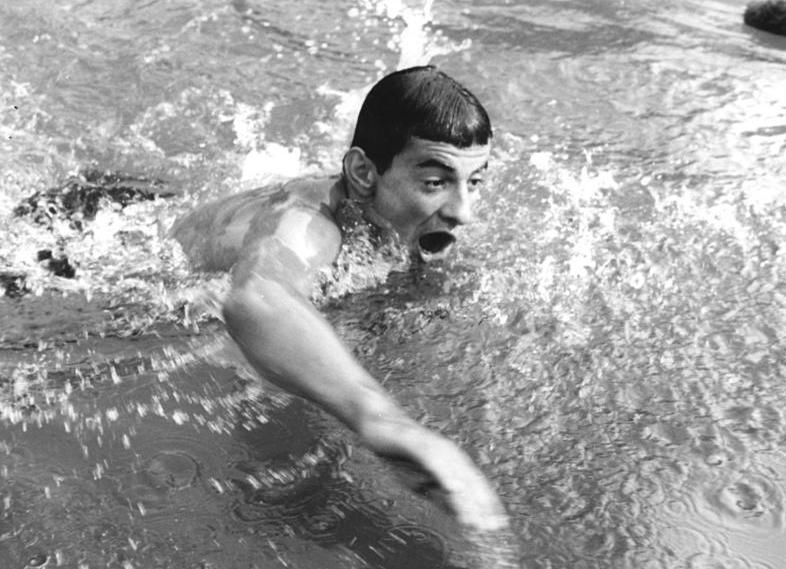
- Karl-Heinz Kutschke in 1958

Personal information
- Born: 18 March 1940 (age 86) Berlin, Germany
- Height: 1.69 m (5 ft 7 in)
- Weight: 64 kg (141 lb)

Sport
- Sport: Modern pentathlon, swimming
- Club: SC Dynamo Berlin

Karl-Heinz Kutschke (born 18 March 1940) is a retired East German modern pentathlete and swimmer. He started his career as a swimmer, winning three national titles in the 1500 m and 4 × 200 m freestyle events and being selected as a reserve for the 1960 Summer Olympics. He then changed to pentathlon and won three national titles in 1965, 1967 and 1968. He competed in pentathlon at the 1968 Summer Olympics and finished fourth individually and sixth with the East German team.
