= Eckhard Tielscher =

German volleyball player (born 1942)

Personal information
- Nationality: German
- Born: 1 September 1942 (age 82); Leipzig, Germany

Sport
- Sport: Volleyball

Eckhard Tielscher (born 1 September 1942) is a German volleyball player. He competed in the men's tournament at the 1968 Summer Olympics.
