= Jalal Lakhnavi =

Urdu poet, writer

- Born: Syed Zamin Ali (or Syed Zaamin Ali); 1834 or 1832; Lucknow, United Provinces (British India)
- Died: 20 October 1909; Lucknow, United Provinces (British India)
- Other name: Jalal (pen name)
- Occupations: Urdu poet, writer, scholar
- Known for: Ghazals, nazms, dictionaries (Gulshan-e-Faiz & Tanqih-ul-Lughaat)

Hakim Syed Zaamin Ali (1832/1834 - 20 Oct 1909), better known as Jalal Lakhnavi, was an Urdu poet, writer and scholar from Rampur state. He wrote Urdu ghazals and nazms under the pen name "Jalal".

== Early life ==
Syed Zamin Ali Jalal Lakhnavi was born in 1834 in Lucknow, the capital of Uttar Pradesh. He received his initially schooling of Persian and Urdu from his father at his home. Lakhnavi later went to Lucknow and studied at Nawab Asaf-ud-Daula school where he learnt Arabic languages.

== Career ==
Apart from Urdu poetry and two dictionaries, Gulshan-e-Faiz & Tanqih-ul-Lughaat, Lakhnavi wrote books on Urdu proverbs, grammar poetics and history-writing.

== Death ==
Jalal Lakhnavi died on 20 Oct 1909 in Lucknow.
