= Meditsinskaya Tekhnika =

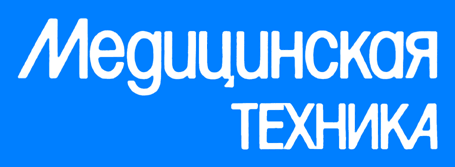
- Discipline: Biomedical engineering
- Language: Russian (original); English (translation)
- Edited by: Sergey V. Selishchev

Publication details
- History: 1967-present
- Publisher: The International Science and Technology Society for Instrumentation and Metrology Engineers (original, Russia); Springer Science+Business Media (translation, USA)
- Frequency: Bimonthly

Standard abbreviations
- ISO 4: Med. Tekh.

Indexing
- ISSN: 0025-8075
- OCLC no.: 1536451
- ISSN: 0006-3398 (print); 1573-8256 (web)

Meditsinskaya Tekhnika (Russian: Медицинская техника, English: Medical Engineering) is a bimonthly Russian peer-reviewed scientific journal established in 1967 and covering the field of biomedical engineering. The self-stated main aim of the journal is to "promptly provide information on the most striking, advanced Russian research in the field of development, production and application of medical equipment."

The journal covers the fields of biomedical technology and administration, and their development. This includes the development of technology for diagnosis and therapy, information storage and retrieval, and hospitals and patient care. An English translation is published by Springer Science+Business Media (Springer New York) under the title Biomedical Engineering (since 1967).

== Abstracting and indexing ==
The journal is abstracted and indexed in:

- Gale Academic OneFile
- Inspec
- Scopus
