= Aluísio Marsili =

Brazilian water polo player (born 1947)

Personal information
- Born: 30 August 1947 (age 77); Rio de Janeiro, Brazil

Sport
- Sport: Water polo

Aluísio Marsili (born 30 August 1947) is a Brazilian water polo player. He competed in the men's tournament at the 1968 Summer Olympics.
