= Marc de Vicoso =

Brazilian water polo player

Personal information
- Born: 1 May 1940 (age 84); Rio de Janeiro, Brazil

Sport
- Sport: Water polo

Marc de Vicoso (born 1 May 1940) is a Brazilian water polo player. He competed in the men's tournament at the 1968 Summer Olympics.
