= Kurt Schuhmann =

German water polo player

Personal information
- Nationality: German
- Born: 12 September 1948 (age 76); Würzburg, Germany

Sport
- Sport: Water polo

Kurt Schuhmann (born 12 September 1948) is a German water polo player. He competed at the 1968 Summer Olympics and the 1972 Summer Olympics.
