= Siegfried Ballerstedt =

German water polo player

Personal information
- Nationality: German
- Born: 5 December 1937 (age 87); Aschersleben, Germany

Sport
- Sport: Water polo

Siegfried Ballerstedt (born 5 December 1937) is a German former water polo player. He competed at the 1964 Summer Olympics and the 1968 Summer Olympics.
