= Jürgen Kluge =

German water polo player

Personal information
- Nationality: German
- Born: 29 December 1939 (age 86) Aschersleben, Germany

Sport
- Sport: Water polo

Jürgen Kluge (born 29 December 1939) is a German water polo player. He competed at the 1964 Summer Olympics and the 1968 Summer Olympics.
