= Santiago Zubicoa =

Spanish water polo player (born 1947)

Personal information
- Nationality: Spanish
- Born: 3 March 1947 (age 78); Barcelona, Spain

Sport
- Sport: Water polo

Santiago Zubicoa (born 3 March 1947) is a Spanish water polo player. He competed in the men's tournament at the 1968 Summer Olympics.
