= Sameh Soliman =

Egyptian water polo player (born 1941)

Personal information
- Nationality: Egyptian
- Born: 7 December 1941 (age 83); Cairo, Egypt

Sport
- Sport: Water polo

Sameh Soliman (born 7 December 1941) is an Egyptian water polo player. He competed in the men's tournament at the 1968 Summer Olympics.
