= Peter Rund =

German water polo player

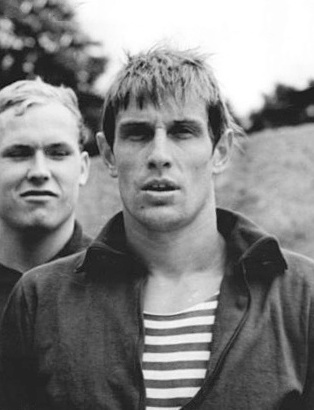
- Rund in 1970

Personal information
- Born: 21 February 1943 Gotha, Germany
- Height: 1.84 m (6 ft 0 in)
- Weight: 77 kg (170 lb)

Sport
- Sport: Water polo, swimming
- Club: SC Dynamo Berlin

Peter Rund (born 21 February 1943) is a retired German water polo player and swimmer. He competed at the 1968 Summer Olympics, and finished in sixth place with the East German team, contributing 13 goals in 9 matches. He also competed in swimming at the national level, winning the East German championships in the 4×100 m freestyle relay in 1970.

He married Evelyn Stolze, a German Olympic swimmer; their daughter Cathleen Rund also became an Olympic swimmer.
