= Hans-Ulrich Lange =

German water polo player

Personal information
- Nationality: German
- Born: 26 April 1946 (age 80) Magdeburg, Germany

Sport
- Sport: Water polo

Hans-Ulrich Lange (born 26 April 1946) is a German water polo player. He competed in the men's tournament at the 1968 Summer Olympics.
