= Jürgen Thiel =

German water polo player

Personal information
- Nationality: German
- Born: 27 March 1937 (age 88); Yasnoye, Russian SFSR, Soviet Union

Sport
- Sport: Water polo

Jürgen Thiel (born 27 March 1937) is a German water polo player. He competed at the 1964 Summer Olympics and the 1968 Summer Olympics.
