= Fermín Más =

Spanish water polo player (born 1946)

Personal information
- Nationality: Spanish
- Born: 9 July 1946 (age 78); Barcelona, Spain

Sport
- Sport: Water polo

Fermín Más (born 9 July 1946) is a Spanish water polo player. He competed in the men's tournament at the 1968 Summer Olympics.
