= Peter Teicher =

German water polo player

Personal information
- Nationality: German
- Born: 24 May 1944 (age 80); Bad Cannstatt, Germany

Sport
- Sport: Water polo

Peter Teicher (born 24 May 1944) is a German water polo player. He competed at the 1968 Summer Olympics and the 1972 Summer Olympics.
