= Veit Herrmanns =

German water polo player

Personal information
- Nationality: German
- Born: 25 May 1946 (age 80) Stendal, Germany

Sport
- Sport: Water polo

Veit Herrmanns (born 25 May 1946) is a German water polo player. He competed in the men's tournament at the 1968 Summer Olympics.
