= Khaled El-Kashef =

Egyptian water polo player (born 1946)

Personal information
- Nationality: Egyptian
- Born: 1 October 1946 (age 79) Cairo, Egypt

Sport
- Sport: Water polo

Khaled El-Kashef (born 1 October 1946) is an Egyptian water polo player. He competed in the men's tournament at the 1968 Summer Olympics.
