= Klaus Schlenkrich =

German water polo player

Personal information
- Nationality: German
- Born: 26 April 1939 (age 85); Leipzig, Germany

Sport
- Sport: Water polo

Klaus Schlenkrich (born 26 April 1939) is a German water polo player. He competed at the 1964 Summer Olympics and the 1968 Summer Olympics.
