= Jorge Borell =

Spanish water polo player (born 1943)

Personal information
- Nationality: Spanish
- Born: 20 September 1943 (age 81); Barcelona, Spain

Sport
- Sport: Water polo

Jorge Borell (born 20 September 1943) is a Spanish water polo player. He competed in the men's tournament at the 1968 Summer Olympics.
