= Hans-Georg Fehn =

German water polo player

Personal information
- Nationality: German
- Born: 16 September 1943; Dessau, Germany
- Died: 6 June 1999 (aged 55); Magdeburg, Germany

Sport
- Sport: Water polo

Hans-Georg Fehn (16 September 1943 – 6 June 1999) was a German water polo player. He competed in the men's tournament at the 1968 Summer Olympics.

== See also ==
- List of men's Olympic water polo tournament goalkeepers
