= Manfred Herzog =

German water polo player

Personal information
- Nationality: German
- Born: 22 October 1946 (age 78); Schwanebeck, Germany

Sport
- Sport: Water polo

Manfred Herzog (born 22 October 1946) is a German former water polo player. He competed in the men's tournament at the 1968 Summer Olympics.
