= Salauddin Ahmed =

Bangladeshi architect

- সালাউদ্দিন আহমদ
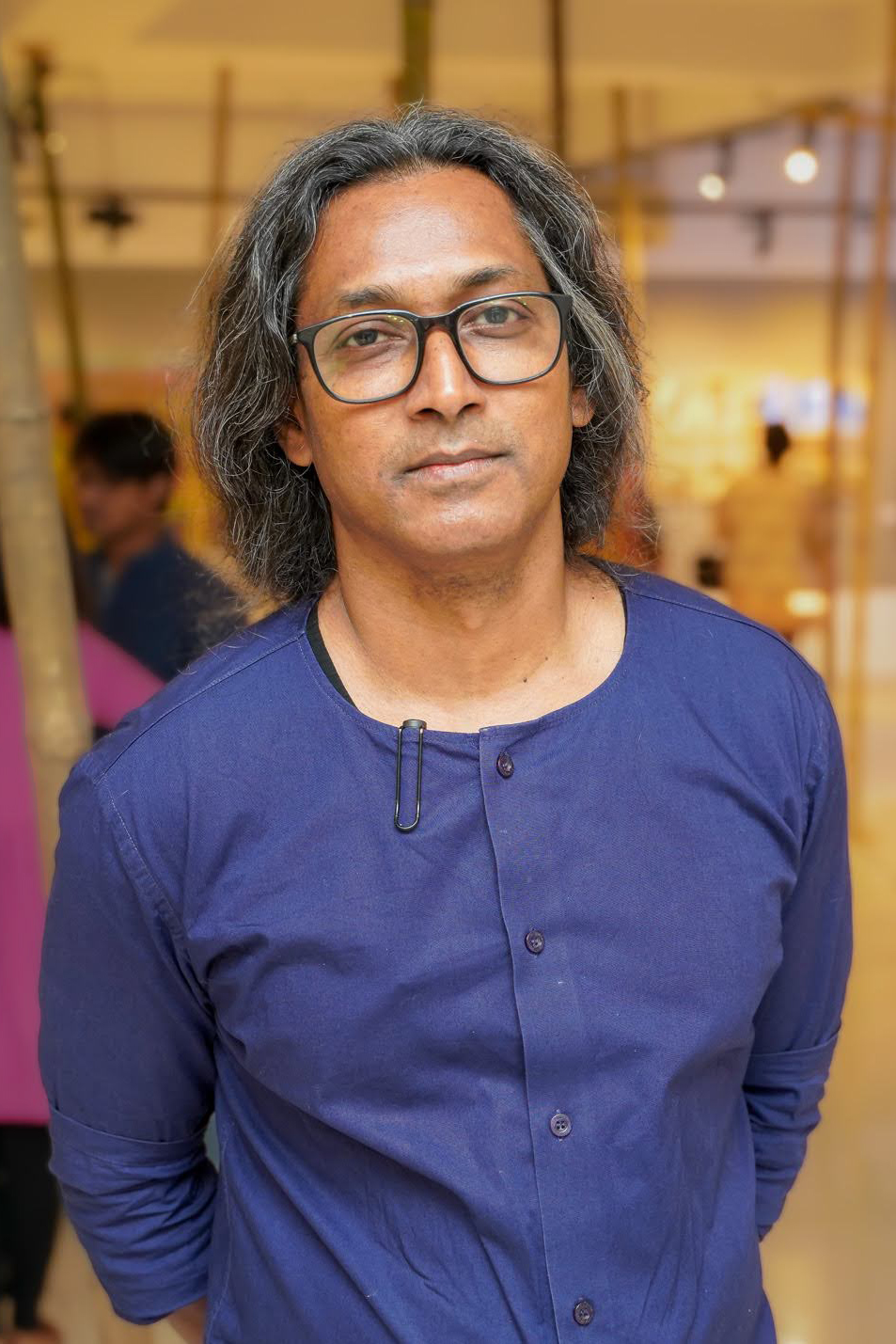
- Born: 1967 (age 58–59); Dhaka, Bangladesh
- Education: Portland State University; University of Pennsylvania
- Occupation: Architect
- Practice: Atelier Robin Architects
- Buildings: Cafe Mango, Karim Residence, bKash (Head office Interior)

Salauddin Ahmed (born 1967 in Dhaka, Bangladesh) is a contemporary Bangladeshi architect. His projects included the Karim Residence in Bashundhara. He is the lead architect at Atelier Robin Architects that he founded in 2001.

== Biography ==
Ahmed received his Bachelor of Fine Arts in 1992 from Portland State University, and an Architecture degree in 1997 from the University of Pennsylvania. After graduation, he worked in the office of Robert Venturi and Denise Scott Brown, as well as the Urban Planning Department of the City of Portland, Oregon. Between 1999 and 2000, he worked for the firm Saiful Hoque Sthapati. In 2001, he founded his own architect firm, Atelier Robin Architects, based in Dhaka.

== Style ==
Salauddin Ahmed described his work as an intent to grasp the vastness of architecture while remaining within the fundamentals of the discipline. He doesn't view architecture as a creative field, but rather as a technical one that requires creativity to produce solutions.

== Notable works ==
- Karim Residence
- Cafe Mango

== Awards ==
- ICE Today-Aqua Paints, for Non Residential design (other category); 2009
- Berger Award for Excellence in Architecture in the Residential category; 2011.
- Institute of Architect Bangladesh Design Award in Residential Building category; 2012.
