= Hans-Jürgen Schüler =

German water polo player

Personal information
- Nationality: German
- Born: 15 September 1945 (age 79); Eckartsberga, Germany

Sport
- Sport: Water polo

Hans-Jürgen Schüler (born 15 August 1945) is a German water polo player. He competed in the men's tournament at the 1968 Summer Olympics.
