= Hossam El-Baroudi =

Egyptian water polo player (born 1950)

Personal information
- Nationality: Egyptian
- Born: 8 September 1950 (age 74); Cairo, Egypt

Sport
- Sport: Water polo

Hossam El-Baroudi (born 8 September 1950) is an Egyptian water polo player. He competed in the men's tournament at the 1968 Summer Olympics.
