= Lolo Ibern =

Spanish water polo player (born 1946)

Personal information
- Full name: Manuel Ibern Alcalde
- Nationality: Spanish
- Born: 21 August 1946 (age 78); Barcelona, Spain

Sport
- Sport: Water polo

Manuel Ibern Alcalde (born 21 August 1946), nicknamed Lolo, is a Spanish water polo player. He competed in the men's tournament at the 1968 Summer Olympics.
