= Alaa El-Din El-Shafei =

Egyptian water polo player (born 1950)

Personal information
- Nationality: Egyptian
- Born: 18 May 1950 (age 74); Cairo, Egypt

Sport
- Sport: Water polo

Alaa El-Din El-Shafei (born 18 May 1950) is an Egyptian water polo player. He competed in the men's tournament at the 1968 Summer Olympics.
