= Salah El-Din Shalabi =

Egyptian water polo player (born 1949)

Salah El-Din Shalaby
Personal information
- Nationality: Egyptian
- Born: 1 August 1949 (age 76); Cairo, Egypt

Sport
- Sport: Water polo

Salah El-Din Shalaby (born 1 August 1949) is an Egyptian water polo player. He competed in the men's tournament at the 1968 Summer Olympics.
