= Shooting at the 1964 Summer Olympics – Men's trap =

Olympic sport shooting event

Men's trap at the Games of the XVIII Olympiad
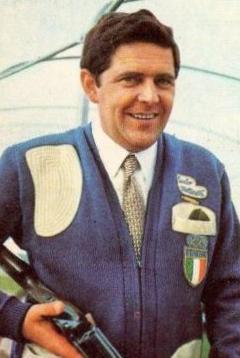
- Gold medalist Ennio Mattarelli
- Venue: Tokorozawa Clay Pigeon Shooting Range, Tokorozawa, Saitama
- Date: 15–17 October 1964
- Competitors: 51 from 28 nations
- Winning score: 198 OR

Medalists
| 1st place, gold medalist(s) | | Ennio Mattarelli | Italy |
| 2nd place, silver medalist(s) | | Pāvels Seničevs | Soviet Union |
| 3rd place, bronze medalist(s) | | William Morris | United States |

The men's trap was a shooting sports event held as part of the Shooting at the 1960 Summer Olympics programme. The competition was held from 15 to 17 October 1964 at the Tokorozawa Clay Pigeon Shooting Range in Tokorozawa, Saitama. 51 shooters from 28 nations competed. Each nation could send up to two shooters. The event was won by Ennio Mattarelli of Italy, the nation's second victory in three Games in the event. Pāvels Seničevs of the Soviet Union took silver. William Morris earned the United States' first medal in the trap since 1924 with his bronze. Seničevs and Morris defeated Galliano Rossini of Italy in a three-way shoot-off for second; Rossini (who had won gold in the event in 1956 and silver in 1960) thus just missed earning a third medal in the trap. Defending champion Ion Dumitrescu of Romania finished fifth.

== Background ==
This was the ninth appearance of the men's ISSF Olympic trap event. The event was held at every Summer Olympics from 1896 to 1924 (except 1904, when no shooting events were held) and from 1952 to 2016. As with most shooting events, it was nominally open to women from 1968 to 1980; the trap remained open to women through 1992. Very few women participated these years. The event returned to being men-only for 1996, though the new double trap had separate events for men and women that year. In 2000, a separate women's event was added and it has been contested at every Games since. There was also a men's team trap event held four times from 1908 to 1924.

Eight of the top 11 (including a tie for 10th) shooters from the 1960 Games returned, including all three medalists: gold medalist Ion Dumitrescu of Romania, silver medalist Galliano Rossini of Italy, bronze medalist Sergei Kalinin of the Soviet Union, sixth-place finisher Joe Wheater of Great Britain, seventh-place finisher Adam Smelczyński of Poland, eighth-place finishers Claude Foussier of France and Karni Singh of India, and tenth-place finisher Laszlo Szapáry of Austria. Rossini was also a former champion (gold in 1956) and was competing in the event for the fourth time. Smelczyński had been the silver medalist to Rossini in 1956. In the two World Championships since 1960, Dumitrescu had taken a bronze (1961) and Singh had taken silver (1962). The 1961 World Champion, Ennio Mattarelli, joined Rossini for a formidable Italian pair.

Israel, Pakistan, and Rhodesia each made their debut in the event. Great Britain made its ninth appearance, the only nation to have competed at each edition of the event to that point.

== Competition format ==
The competition used the 200-target format introduced with the return of trap to the Olympics in 1952. The 1964 event dropped the two-round competition that had been used in 1960; only a single round of shooting was done, with all shooters facing 200 targets. Shooting was done in 8 series of 25 targets.

== Records ==
Prior to this competition, the existing world and Olympic records were as follows.

| World record | | | | |
| Olympic record | Galliano Rossini (ITA) | 195 | Melbourne, Australia | 29 November – 1 December 1956 |

Ennio Mattarelli of Italy set a new Olympic record at 198.

== Schedule ==
| Date | Time | Round |
|---|---|---|
| Thursday, 15 October 1964; Friday, 16 October 1964; Saturday, 17 October 1964 | 9:30 | Final |

== Results ==
| Rank | Shooter | Nation | Score | Notes |
|---|---|---|---|---|
| 1st place, gold medalist(s) | Ennio Mattarelli | Italy | 198 | OR |
| 2nd place, silver medalist(s) | Pāvels Seničevs | Soviet Union | 194 | Shoot-off: 25 |
| 3rd place, bronze medalist(s) | William Morris | United States | 194 | Shoot-off: 24 |
| 4 | Galliano Rossini | Italy | 194 | Shoot-off: 23 |
| 5 | Ion Dumitrescu | Romania | 193 | |
| 6 | Juan Enrique Lira | Chile | 193 | |
| 7 | Bob Braithwaite | Great Britain | 192 | |
| 8 | Joachim Marscheider | United Team of Germany | 191 | |
| 9 | Josef Meixner | Austria | 190 | |
| 10 | Mohamed Mehrez | Egypt | 190 | |
| 11 | Joe Wheater | Great Britain | 190 | |
| 12 | Floyd Nattrass | Canada | 190 | |
| 13 | Juan Ángel Martini, Sr. | Argentina | 189 | |
| 14 | Heinz Rehder | United Team of Germany | 189 | |
| 15 | Mitsuo Sanami | Japan | 189 | |
| 16 | Lennart Ahlin | Sweden | 189 | |
| 17 | Gilberto Navarro | Chile | 188 | |
| 18 | Armando Marques | Portugal | 188 | |
| 19 | Georgios Pangalos | Greece | 187 | |
| 20 | Rune Flodman | Sweden | 187 | |
| 21 | Frank Little | United States | 187 | |
| 22 | Sergei Kalinin | Soviet Union | 187 | |
| 23 | An Jeong-geun | South Korea | 186 | |
| 24 | Claude Foussier | France | 186 | |
| 25 | Jaime Bladas | Spain | 186 | |
| 26 | Karni Singh | India | 186 | |
| 27 | Johannes Lamprecht | Rhodesia | 186 | |
| 28 | Guy de Valle Flor | Portugal | 186 | |
| 29 | Michel Prévost | France | 184 | |
| 30 | Toshiyasu Ishige | Japan | 184 | |
| 31 | José Luis Alonso Berbegal | Spain | 184 | |
| 32 | Adam Smelczyński | Poland | 183 | |
| 33 | Gheorghe Enache | Romania | 182 | |
| 34 | Eduard de Atzel | Peru | 182 | |
| 35 | Park Sam-gyu | South Korea | 181 | |
| 36 | Goh Tai Yong | Malaysia | 178 | |
| 37 | Enrique Dibos | Peru | 178 | |
| 38 | Ahmed Kadry Genena | Egypt | 178 | |
| 39 | Harry Willsie | Canada | 177 | |
| 40 | Joseph Aoun | Lebanon | 176 | |
| 41 | Lin Ho-ming | Taiwan | 175 | |
| 42 | Jack Rickards | Rhodesia | 174 | |
| 43 | Laszlo Szapáry | Austria | 173 | |
| 44 | José Passera | Argentina | 173 | |
| 45 | Fotios Isaakidis | Greece | 172 | |
| 46 | Jaime Loyola | Puerto Rico | 171 | |
| 47 | Maksim Kahan | Israel | 170 | |
| 48 | Lin Wen-chu | Taiwan | 170 | |
| 49 | Devi Singh | India | 168 | |
| 50 | Yap Pow Thong | Malaysia | 140 | |
| 51 | Moihuddin Khawja | Pakistan | 91 | |
| — | Miguel Torres | Puerto Rico | DNS | |
| — | Antonios Saad | Lebanon | DNS | |
