= Shooting at the 1968 Summer Olympics – Mixed trap =

Mixed trap at the Games of the XIX Olympiad
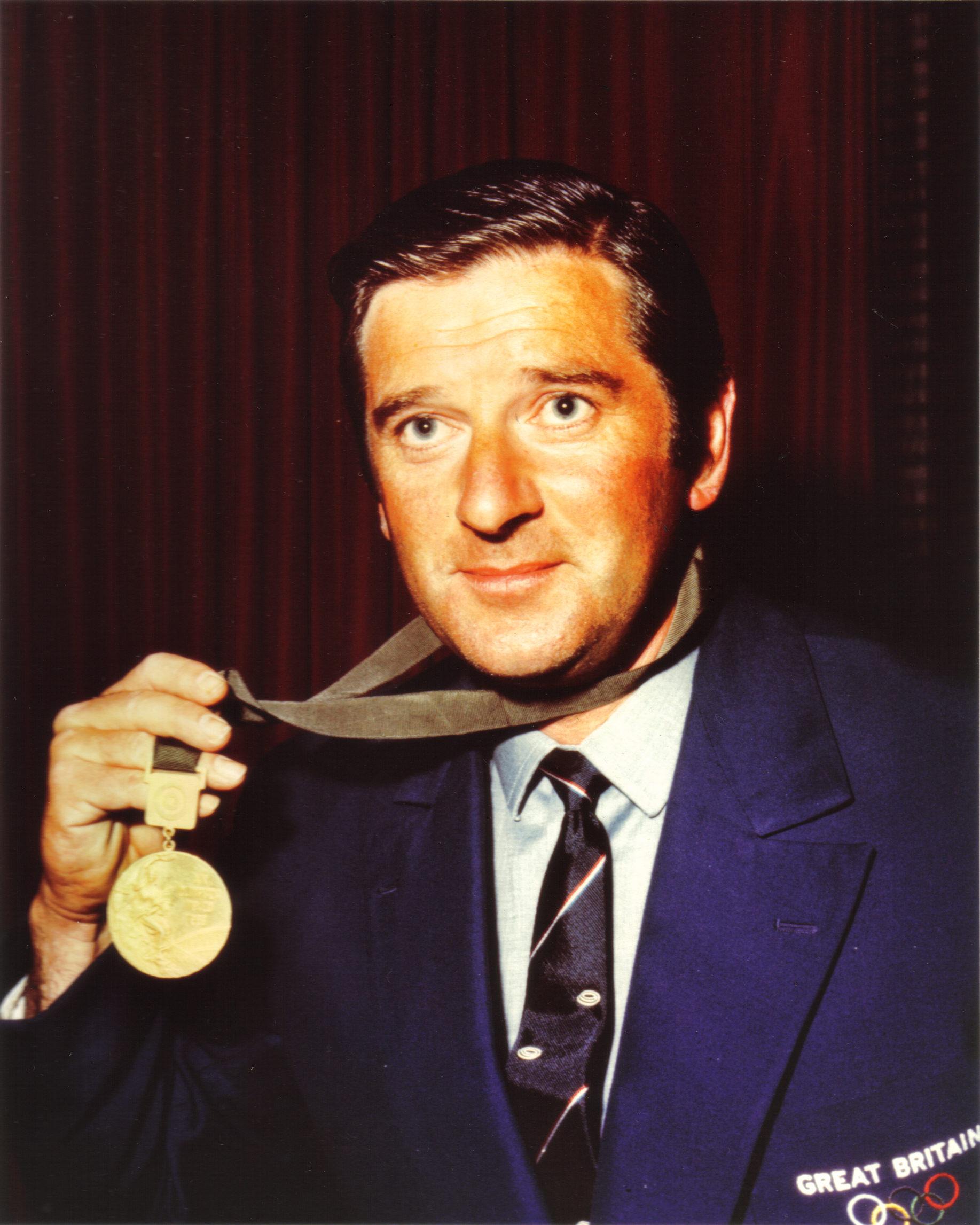
- Gold medalist Bob Braithwaite
- Venue: Vicente Suárez Shooting Range
- Dates: 18–19 October 1968
- Competitors: 55 from 34 nations
- Winning score: 198 =OR

Medalists
1st place, gold medalist(s)		Bob Braithwaite	Great Britain
2nd place, silver medalist(s)		Thomas Garrigus	United States
3rd place, bronze medalist(s)		Kurt Czekalla	East Germany

The trap was a shooting sports event held as part of the Shooting at the 1968 Summer Olympics programme. The competition was held on 18 and 19 October 1968 at the shooting ranges in Mexico City. 55 shooters from 34 nations competed. For the first time, the event was open to women as well as men (though none competed). Nations were limited to two shooters each. The event was won by Bob Braithwaite of Great Britain, the nation's first victory in the event and first medal of any color in the trap since 1908. Silver went to Thomas Garrigus of the United States. Kurt Czekalla of East Germany took bronze; it was the first medal in the event for East Germany as a separate nation, and the first medal for any German trap shooter since 1912.

== Background ==
This was the 10th appearance of the men's ISSF Olympic trap event. The event was held at every Summer Olympics from 1896 to 1924 (except 1904, when no shooting events were held) and from 1952 to 2016. As with most shooting events, it was nominally open to women from 1968 to 1980; the trap remained open to women through 1992. Very few women participated these years. The event returned to being men-only for 1996, though the new double trap had separate events for men and women that year. In 2000, a separate women's event was added and it has been contested at every Games since. There was also a men's team trap event held four times from 1908 to 1924.

Eight of the top 10 shooters from the 1964 Games returned: gold medalist Ennio Mattarelli of Italy, silver medalist Pāvels Seničevs of the Soviet Union, fourth-place finisher Galliano Rossini of Italy, fifth-place finisher Ion Dumitrescu of Romania, sixth-place finisher Juan Enrique Lira of Chile, seventh-place finisher Bob Braithwaite of Great Britain, ninth-place finisher Josef Meixner of Austria, and tenth-place finisher Mohamed Mehrez of Egypt. Rossini was competing for the fifth time in the event, with a 1956 gold medal and a 1960 silver medal under his belt. Two of the three World Champions since the last Games competed: Lira (1965) and Guy Rénard of Belgium (1967); Seničevs had taken bronze in 1966.

The Browning shotgun was the most popular armament for the event.

Bolivia, the Dominican Republic, El Salvador, Ireland, Mexico, Thailand, Turkey, and Uruguay each made their debut in the event; East and West Germany competed separately for the first time. Great Britain made its 10th appearance, the only nation to have competed at each edition of the event to that point.

== Competition format ==
The competition used the 200-target format introduced with the return of trap to the Olympics in 1952. Only a single round of shooting was done, with all shooters facing 200 targets. Shooting was done in 8 series of 25 targets. Shoot-offs of 25 targets each were shot as necessary to resolve ties for medals.

== Records ==
Prior to this competition, the existing world and Olympic records were as follows.

World record				
Olympic record	Ennio Mattarelli (ITA)	198	Tokyo, Japan	15–17 October 1964

Bob Braithwaite of Great Britain tied the Olympic record at 198.

== Schedule ==
Date	Time	Round
Friday, 18 October 1968	8:30	Course 1
Saturday, 19 October 1968	8:30	Course 2

== Results ==
Braithwaite started his first series at 11 of 13, but then finished that series and each of the next seven perfectly (hitting 187 consecutive targets).

A three-way tie for second place at 196 points required a shoot-off. Defending silver medalist Seničevs hit 22 on the shoot-off, while Garrigus and Czekalla both were perfect. The latter two advanced to a second shoot-off. Czekalla missed the first target, enough to put Garrigus on top for silver when the American was perfect again; Czekalla finished the second shoot-off at 23 and a bronze medal.

Rank	Shooter	Nation	Score	Notes
1st place, gold medalist(s)	Bob Braithwaite	Great Britain	198	=OR
2nd place, silver medalist(s)	Thomas Garrigus	United States	196	Shoot-off 1: 25; Shoot-off 2: 25
3rd place, bronze medalist(s)	Kurt Czekalla	East Germany	196	Shoot-off 1: 25; Shoot-off 2: 23
4	Pāvels Seničevs	Soviet Union	196	Shoot-off 1: 22
5	Pierre Candelo	France	195	
6	Adam Smelczyński	Poland	195	
7	Aleksandr Alipov	Soviet Union	195	
8	John Primrose	Canada	194	
9	Jaime Bladas	Spain	194	
10	Karni Singh	India	194	
11	Ion Dumitrescu	Romania	193	
12	Michel Carrega	France	193	
13	Galliano Rossini	Italy	193	
14	José Cusí	Spain	192	
15	Juan Enrique Lira	Chile	192	
16	Edward Shaske	Canada	192	
17	Randhir Singh	India	192	
18	Elias Salhab	Lebanon	191	
19	Mohamed Mehrez	Egypt	191	
20	Pedro Estay	Chile	191	
21	Gheorghe Florescu	Romania	191	
22	Rodolfo Guarnieri	Argentina	190	
23	Rudolf Hager	East Germany	190	
24	Juan Ángel Martini Jr.	Argentina	190	
25	Georgios Pangalos	Greece	190	
26	Ray Stafford	United States	189	
27	Ennio Mattarelli	Italy	189	
28	Sten Karlsson	Sweden	189	
29	Werner Bühse	West Germany	189	
30	Metin Salihoğlu	Turkey	188	
31	George Silvernail	Puerto Rico	188	
32	Ivo Orlandi	Venezuela	187	
33	Miguel Barrenechea	Mexico	187	
34	Eric Grantham	Great Britain	187	
35	Markos Tzoumaras	Greece	187	
36	Guy Rénard	Belgium	187	
37	Josef Meixner	Austria	187	
38	Erich Gehmann	West Germany	187	
39	Kjell Sørensen	Norway	185	
40	Pavitr Kachasanee	Thailand	183	
41	Gustavo Zepeda	Mexico	181	
42	Leo Franciosi	San Marino	181	
43	Lin Ho-ming	Taiwan	181	
44	Badir Shoukri	Egypt	177	
45	Salvatore Pelliccioni	San Marino	177	
46	Cheng Sung-gun	Taiwan	175	
47	Dermot Kelly	Ireland	175	
48	Walter Perón	Peru	175	
49	Dipya Mongkollugsana	Thailand	175	
50	Arturo Porro	Uruguay	171	
51	Carlos Asbun	Bolivia	163	
52	Ricardo Roberts	Bolivia	161	
53	Ángel Marchand	Puerto Rico	156	
54	Roberto Soundy	El Salvador	125	
55	Domingo Lorenzo	Dominican Republic	124	
