= Lebanon at the 1960 Summer Olympics =

- IOC code: LIB
- NOC: Lebanese Olympic Committee

in Rome
- Competitors: 19 in 6 sports
- Medals: Gold 0 Silver 0 Bronze 0 Total 0

Summer Olympics appearances (overview)
- 1948; 1952; 1956; 1960; 1964; 1968; 1972; 1976; 1980; 1984; 1988; 1992; 1996; 2000; 2004; 2008; 2012; 2016; 2020; 2024

Lebanon competed at the 1960 Summer Olympics in Rome, Italy. The nation returned to the Olympic Games after boycotting the 1956 Summer Olympics because of British and French involvement in the Suez Crisis. 19 competitors, all men, took part in 15 events in 6 sports.

== Fencing ==
Four fencers, represented Lebanon in 1960.

Men's épée

- Ibrahim Osman
- Michel Saykali
- Mohamed Ramadan

Men's team épée

- Ibrahim Osman, Mohamed Ramadan, Michel Saykali, Hassan El-Said

== Shooting ==
Three shooters represented Lebanon in 1960.

50 m rifle, prone

- Abdullah Jaroudi, Jr.

Trap

- Elias Salhab
- Maurice Tabet

== Wrestling ==
Nazem Amine
