= Lebanon at the 1984 Summer Olympics =

- IOC code: LIB
- NOC: Lebanese Olympic Committee

in Los Angeles
- Competitors: 22 in 9 sports
- Flag bearer: Toni Khoury
- Medals: Gold 0 Silver 0 Bronze 0 Total 0

Summer Olympics appearances (overview)
- 1948; 1952; 1956; 1960; 1964; 1968; 1972; 1976; 1980; 1984; 1988; 1992; 1996; 2000; 2004; 2008; 2012; 2016; 2020; 2024

Lebanon competed at the 1984 Summer Olympics in Los Angeles, United States. 22 competitors, 21 men and 1 woman, took part in 20 events in 9 sports.

== Athletics ==
Men's Long Jump

- Ghabi Issa Khouri

- Qualification — 6.80m (→ did not advance, 27th place)

== Cycling ==
One cyclist represented Lebanon in 1984.

Individual road race

- Sirop Arslanian — did not finish (→ no ranking)

== Fencing ==
Four fencers, all men, represented Lebanon in 1984.

Men's foil

- Henri Darricau
- Dany Haddad
- Yves Daniel Darricau

Men's team foil

- Henri Darricau, Yves Daniel Darricau, Dany Haddad, Michel Youssef

== Judo ==
Men

Athlete	Event	Round of 32	Round of 16	Quarterfinals	Semifinals	First Repechage Round	Repechage Quarterfinals	Repechage Semifinals	Final
Athlete	Event	Opposition Result	Opposition Result	Opposition Result	Opposition Result	Opposition Result	Opposition Result	Opposition Result	Opposition Result
Roni Khawam	−71kg	Garma (TUN); L 0000-1001	Did not advance						

== Shooting ==
Mixed trap

Jean Gemayel (=51); Elia Nasrallah (=57)

Mixed skeet

Elias Harb (57); Gebrael Haoui (=58)

== Swimming ==
Men's 100m Freestyle

- Percy Sayegh

- Heat — 1:01.88 (→ did not advance, 66th place)

- Rami Kantari

- Heat — 1:01.96 (→ did not advance, 67th place)

Men's 200m Freestyle

- Percy Sayegh

- Heat — 2:20.76 (→ did not advance, 55th place)

- Rami Kantari

- Heat — 2:25.43 (→ did not advance, 56th place)

Men's 100m Backstroke

- Ibrahim El-Baba

- Heat — 1:13.76 (→ did not advance, 44th place)

- Rami Kantari

- Heat — DSQ (→ did not advance, no ranking)

Men's 100m Breaststroke

- Amine El-Domyati

- Heat — 1:19.10 (→ did not advance, 50th place)

Men's 200m Breaststroke

- Amine El-Domyati

- Heat — DNS (→ did not advance, no ranking)

Men's 100m Butterfly

- Ibrahim El-Baba

- Heat — 1:04.48 (→ did not advance, 46th place)
