= Shooting at the 1968 Summer Olympics =

Shooting at the Games of the XIX Olympiad
- Dates: 18–23 October 1968

Shooting at the 1968 Summer Olympics in Mexico City comprised seven events. A second shotgun event, Skeet, was introduced. They were held between 18 and 23 October 1968. For the first time, women competed alongside men.

== Medal summary ==
Event	Gold		Silver		Bronze	
rapid fire pistol	Józef Zapędzki; Poland	593	Marcel Roșca; Romania	591	Renart Suleymanov; Soviet Union	591
pistol	Grigory Kosykh; Soviet Union	562	Heinz Mertel; West Germany	562	Harald Vollmar; East Germany	560
300 metre rifle, three positions	Gary Anderson; United States	1157	Valentin Kornev; Soviet Union	1151	Kurt Müller; Switzerland	1148
rifle, three positions	Bernd Klingner; West Germany	1157	John Writer; United States	1156	Vitali Parkhimovitch; Soviet Union	1154
rifle, prone	Jan Kůrka; Czechoslovakia	598	László Hammerl; Hungary	598	Ian Ballinger; New Zealand	597
skeet	Yevgeni Petrov; Soviet Union	198	Romano Garagnani; Italy	198	Konrad Wirnhier; West Germany	198
trap	Bob Braithwaite; Great Britain	198	Thomas Garrigus; United States	196	Kurt Czekalla; East Germany	196

== Participating nations ==
A total of 351 shooters, 348 men and 3 women, from 62 nations competed at the Mexico City Games:

- Argentina (4)
- Australia (3)
- Austria (5)
- Barbados (1)
- Belgium (3)
- Bolivia (2)
- British Honduras (2)
- Brazil (2)
- Bulgaria (6)
- Canada (10)
- Chile (4)
- Taiwan (8)
- Costa Rica (5)
- Cuba (8)
- Czechoslovakia (8)
- Denmark (6)

- Dominican Republic (3)
- East Germany (9)
- El Salvador (8)
- Egypt (2)
- Finland (9)
- France (8)
- Great Britain (10)
- Greece (7)
- Guatemala (9)
- Hong Kong (3)
- Hungary (6)
- India (2)
- Ireland (3)
- Israel (4)
- Italy (7)
- Japan (6)

- Kenya (3)
- Lebanon (3)
- Luxembourg (1)
- Malta (1)
- Mexico (11)
- Monaco (2)
- Mongolia (3)
- New Zealand (2)
- Norway (4)
- Peru (5)
- Philippines (8)
- Poland (11)
- Puerto Rico (9)
- Romania (12)
- San Marino (2)
- Singapore (1)

- South Korea (2)
- Soviet Union (12)
- Spain (12)
- Sweden (9)
- Switzerland (10)
- Thailand (11)
- Trinidad and Tobago (2)
- Turkey (3)
- United States (12)
- Uruguay (3)
- Venezuela (5)
- Vietnam (3)
- West Germany (12)
- Yugoslavia (4)

== Medal count ==
Rank	Nation	Gold	Silver	Bronze	Total
1	Soviet Union	2	1	2	5
2	United States	1	2	0	3
3	West Germany	1	1	1	3
4	Czechoslovakia	1	0	0	1
4	Great Britain	1	0	0	1
4	Poland	1	0	0	1
7	Hungary	0	1	0	1
7	Italy	0	1	0	1
7	Romania	0	1	0	1
10	East Germany	0	0	2	2
11	New Zealand	0	0	1	1
11	Switzerland	0	0	1	1
Totals (12 entries)		7	7	7	21
