= Lebanon at the 1964 Summer Olympics =

- IOC code: LIB (LEB used at these Games)
- NOC: Lebanese Olympic Committee

in Tokyo
- Competitors: 5 in 2 sports
- Medals: Gold 0 Silver 0 Bronze 0 Total 0

Summer Olympics appearances (overview)
- 1948; 1952; 1956; 1960; 1964; 1968; 1972; 1976; 1980; 1984; 1988; 1992; 1996; 2000; 2004; 2008; 2012; 2016; 2020; 2024

Lebanon competed at the 1964 Summer Olympics in Tokyo, Japan. Five competitors, all men, took part in three events in two sports.

== Fencing ==
Four fencers represented Lebanon in 1964.

Men's épée

- Hassan El-Said
- Michel Saykali
- Joseph Gemayel

Men's team épée

- Michel Saykali, Joseph Gemayel, Hassan El-Said, Ibrahim Osman

== Shooting ==
- Joseph Aoun
