= Lebanon at the 1988 Summer Olympics =

- IOC code: LIB
- NOC: Lebanese Olympic Committee

in Seoul
- Competitors: 21 (19 men, 2 women) in 8 sports
- Medals: Gold 0 Silver 0 Bronze 0 Total 0

Summer Olympics appearances (overview)
- 1948; 1952; 1956; 1960; 1964; 1968; 1972; 1976; 1980; 1984; 1988; 1992; 1996; 2000; 2004; 2008; 2012; 2016; 2020; 2024

Lebanon competed at the 1988 Summer Olympics in Seoul, South Korea. 21 competitors, 19 men and 2 women, took part in 28 events in 8 sports.

== Competitors ==
The following is the list of number of competitors in the Games.

Sport	Men	Women	Total
Athletics	2	1	3
Boxing	3	–	3
Cycling	2	0	2
Fencing	2	0	2
Judo	3	–	3
Swimming	3	1	4
Weightlifting	3	–	3
Wrestling	1	–	1
Total	19	2	21

== Athletics ==
=== Men ===
==== Track events ====
Athlete	Events	Heat		Semifinal		Final	
Athlete	Events	Time	Position	Time	Position	Time	Position
Jihad Salame	100 m	11.49	95	Did not advance			
Maher Abbas	400 m	51.29	70	Did not advance			
Maher Abbas	800 m	1:53.76	58	Did not advance			

=== Women ===
==== Track events ====
Athlete	Events	Heat		Semifinal		Final	
Athlete	Events	Time	Position	Time	Position	Time	Position
May Sardouk	400 m	60.01	45	Did not advance			

== Boxing ==
Athlete	Event	Round of 64	Round of 32	Round of 16	Quarterfinals	Semifinals	Final
Athlete	Event	Opposition Result	Opposition Result	Opposition Result	Opposition Result	Opposition Result	Opposition Result
Bilal El-Masri	Light Welterweight	Adrian Carew (GUY); L 5:0	Did not advance				
Mirwan Kassouf	Middleweight	Michele Mastrodonato (ITA); L RSCH	Did not advance				
Ahmed El-Masri	Light Heavyweight		Brent Kosolofski (CAN); L RSCH	Did not advance			

== Cycling ==
=== Road ===
Men

Athlete	Event	Time	Rank
Georges Honein	Road race	DNF	-
Hratch Zadorian	Road race	DNF	-

== Fencing ==
Men

Athlete	Event	Preliminary round	Round of 32	Round of 16	Quarterfinal	Semifinal	Final	Final rank
Zahi El-Khoury	Foil		Did not advance					68
Zahi El-Khoury	Épée		Did not advance					74
Michel Youssef	Foil		Did not advance					52
Michel Youssef	Épée		Did not advance					78

== Judo ==
Men

Athlete	Event	Round of 32	Round of 16	Quarterfinals	Semifinals	First Repechage Round	Repechage Quarterfinals	Repechage Semifinals	Final
Athlete	Event	Opposition Result	Opposition Result	Opposition Result	Opposition Result	Opposition Result	Opposition Result	Opposition Result	Opposition Result
Roni Khawam	−71kg	Brown (GBR); L 0000-1001	Did not advance						
Kamil Sabali	−65kg	Elmamoun (MAR); L 0000-1101	Did not advance						
Fadi Saikali	−78kg	Tayot (FRA); L 0000-0200	Did not advance						

== Swimming ==
Men

Athlete	Events	Heat		Semifinal		Final	
Athlete	Events	Time	Rank	Time	Rank	Time	Rank
Amine El-Domyati	50 m freestyle	27.34	67	Did not advance			
Amine El-Domyati	100 m breastroke	1:14.40	57	Did not advance			
Amine El-Domyati	200 m breastroke	2:44.34	51	Did not advance			
Rami Kantari	100 m backstroke	1:09.35	50	Did not advance			
Rami Kantari	200 m backstroke	2:40.29	41	Did not advance			
Rami Kantari	200 m individual medley	2:34.53	56	Did not advance			
Emile Lahoud	100 m freestyle	1:02.40	75	Did not advance			
Emile Lahoud	200 m freestyle	2:16.39	63	Did not advance			
Emile Lahoud	400 m freestyle	4:47.09	48	Did not advance			

Women

Athlete	Events	Heat		Semifinal		Final	
Athlete	Events	Time	Rank	Time	Rank	Time	Rank
Nancy Khalaf	50 m freestyle	30.77	50	Did not advance			
Nancy Khalaf	100 m freestyle	1:06.73	56	Did not advance			
Nancy Khalaf	200 m freestyle	DNS	-	Did not advance			

== Weightlifting ==
Men

Athlete	Event	Snatch		Clean & jerk		Total	Rank
Athlete	Event	Result	Rank	Result	Rank	Total	Rank
Mohamadamine Alaywan	Lightweight	95 kg	21	122.5 kg	21	217.5 kg	20
Hassan El-Kaissi	Middle-heavyweight	135 kg	19	172.5 kg	17	307.5 kg	19
Khodr Olaywan	Flyweight	85 kg	23	100 kg	22	185 kg	21

== Wrestling ==
=== Men's Greco-Roman ===
Athlete	Event	Preliminary round	Standing	Final
Athlete	Event	Opposition Score	Standing	Opposition Score
Khodr Bechara	130 kg	Lubomir David (TCH); L 0-4 Duane Koslowski (USA); L 0-7	8th in group 12th overall	Did not advance
