= Lebanon at the 1972 Summer Olympics =

- IOC code: LIB
- NOC: Lebanese Olympic Committee

in Munich
- Competitors: 19 in 9 sports
- Medals Ranked 33rd: Gold 0 Silver 1 Bronze 0 Total 1

Summer Olympics appearances (overview)
- 1948; 1952; 1956; 1960; 1964; 1968; 1972; 1976; 1980; 1984; 1988; 1992; 1996; 2000; 2004; 2008; 2012; 2016; 2020; 2024

Lebanon competed at the 1972 Summer Olympics in Munich, West Germany and won one silver medal. 19 competitors, 17 men and 2 women, took part in 23 events in 9 sports.

== Medalists ==
=== Silver ===
- Mohamed Traboulsi — Weightlifting, middleweight

== Athletics ==
Men's 800 metres

- Hamze Kassem

- Heat — 1:52.5 (→ did not advance)

Men's 1500 metres

- Kassem Hamze

- Heat — DNS (→ did not advance)

== Boxing ==
Men's Light Middleweight (– 71 kg)

- Farouk Kesrouan otherwise Kesrouani

- First Round — Bye
- Second Round — Lost to Christopher Elliott (IRL), 0:5

== Cycling ==
One cyclist represented Lebanon in 1972.

Individual road race

- Tarek Abou Al Dahab — did not finish (→ no ranking)

Individual pursuit

- Tarek Abou Al Dahab

== Fencing ==
Four fencers, all men, represented Lebanon in 1972.

Men's foil

- Yves Daniel Darricau
- Fawzi Merhi
- Ali Sleiman

Men's team foil

- Ali Chekr, Yves Daniel Darricau, Fawzi Merhi, Ali Sleiman

Men's épée

- Ali Chekr
- Ali Sleiman
- Yves Daniel Darricau

Men's team épée

- Ali Chekr, Yves Daniel Darricau, Fawzi Merhi, Ali Sleiman

Men's sabre

- Fawzi Merhi
- Yves Daniel Darricau

== Shooting ==
Four shooters, all men, represented Lebanon in 1972.

Trap

- Elias Salhab
- Assaad Andraos

Skeet

- Antoine Saade
- Maurice Tabet

== Swimming ==
Men's 100m Freestyle

- Bruno Bassoul

- Heat — 1:00.08 (→ did not advance)

Men's 200m Freestyle

- Bruno Bassoul

- Heat — DNS (→ did not advance)

== Weightlifting ==
Middleweight

- Mohamed Traboulsi — Silver medal
