= Lebanon at the 1980 Summer Olympics =

- IOC code: LIB
- NOC: Lebanese Olympic Committee

in Moscow
- Competitors: 15 in 8 sports
- Medals Ranked 35th: Gold 0 Silver 0 Bronze 1 Total 1

Summer Olympics appearances (overview)
- 1948; 1952; 1956; 1960; 1964; 1968; 1972; 1976; 1980; 1984; 1988; 1992; 1996; 2000; 2004; 2008; 2012; 2016; 2020; 2024

Lebanon competed at the 1980 Summer Olympics in Moscow, USSR. They entered 15 competitors, all men, who took part in 16 events in 8 sports.

== Medalists ==
=== Bronze ===
- Hassan Bchara — Wrestling, Men's Greco-Roman Super Heavyweight

== Athletics ==
Men's 100 metres

- Roland Dagher

- Heat — 11.01 (→ did not advance)

Men's 200 metres

- Roland Dagher

- Heat — 22.27 (→ did not advance)

Men's Marathon

- Nabil Choueiri (Note: also transliteated as Choueiry and Chouéry)

- Final — did not finish (→ no ranking)

== Cycling ==
Two cyclists represented Lebanon in 1980.

Individual road race

- Salloum Kaysar
- Kamal Ghalayni

== Fencing ==
Two fencers represented Lebanon in 1980.

Men's foil

- Dany Haddad
- Hassan Hamze

Men's épée

- Dany Haddad
- Hassan Hamze

== Swimming ==
Men's 100m Freestyle

- Bilall Yamouth

- Heats — 1.03,48 (→ did not advance)

Men's 200m Freestyle

- Bilall Yamouth

- Heats — 2.27,94 (→ did not advance)
