= Ahlin =

Ahlin (also Åhlin) is a Swedish surname. People with the name include:

- Cvetka Ahlin (1927–1985), Slovenian opera singer
- Harry Ahlin (1900–1969), Swedish film actor
- Karin Åhlin (1830–1899), Swedish educator
- Lars Ahlin (1915–1997), Swedish author and aesthetician
- Lennart Ahlin (1916–1995), Swedish sports shooter
- Per Åhlin (1931–2023), Swedish artist and director of animated films
- Rudy Ahlin (1914–1976), American ice hockey player
- Tina Ahlin (born 1967), Swedish composer, pianist and singer
- Urban Ahlin (born 1964), Swedish Social Democratic Party politician
