= Aoun =

Aoun is a surname. Notable people with the surname include:

- Ahmed Oun (also spelled Aoun; born 1946), Libyan military officer
- Ali Aoun, Algerian politician
- Alain Aoun (born 1971), Lebanese politician
- Christopher Aoun (born 1989), Lebanese-German cinematographer
- Ghada Aoun, Lebanese judge
- Joseph Aoun, multiple people
- Laetitia Aoun (born 2001), Lebanese taekwondo practitioner
- Mario Aoun (born 1951), Lebanese politician
- Michel Aoun (born 1933), Lebanese politician and former president of Lebanon
- Michel Aoun (bishop) (born 1959), Eparch in the Maronite Catholic Church
- Osama Al-Aoun (born 1986), Qatari football player
- Samar Aoun, Australian palliative care researcher
- Tobia Aoun (1803–1871), Lebanese Maronite Catholic bishop
