= List of Lebanese sprinters =

Lebanon has been represented internationally in track and field sprint competitions by multiple men and women. Gretta Taslakian is the sprinter to have competed most for Lebanon at the Olympics, representing the country three times.

== Men ==
Athlete	Born	Event(s)	Olympics	World	Notes	Ref
Christophe Boulos	20 August 1996	60 metres	No	No	Competed at 2018 World Indoor	
Roland Dagher	?	100 metres	1980	No		
Noureddine Hadid	28 January 1993	60, 100, 200, 400 metres	2020	2019	200 m bronze at 2021 Arab Athletics Championships; Competed at 2018 Asian Games	
Kassem Hamzé	2 January 1950	400 metres	1972	No		
Jean-Yves Mallat	31 August 1962	100, 200 metres	1984	1983		
Jihad Salame	7 August 1962	100 metres	1988	No		
Mohamad Siraj Tamim	2 June 1985	200 metres	2008	No		

== Women ==
Athlete	Born	Event(s)	Olympics	World	Notes	Ref
Lina Bejjani	29 August 1984	100 metres	2000	No		
Arda Kalpakian	11 April 1944	400 metres	1972	No		
Zeina Mina	1 January 1963	400 metres	1984	1983, 1987		
Ghiya Mtairek	9 January 2000	400 metres	No	No	Competed at 2016 West Asian Junior Championships	
May Sardouk	4 June 1963	400 metres	1988	No	Five appearances at the Universiade	
Aziza Sbaity	17 November 1991	60, 100, 200 metres	No	2015	Competed at 2014, 2016 and 2022 World Indoors	
Gretta Taslakian	16 August 1985	100, 200, 400 metres	2004, 2008, 2012	2001, 2007, 2013	Participant 2002, 2006, 2010 Asian Games	
