= Barrenechea =

Barrenechea is a surname. Notable people with the surname include:

- Agustín Barrenechea (born 1979), Argentine-born American football linebacker
- Alejandro Barrenechea (born 1976), Spanish gymnast
- Ana María Barrenechea (1913–2010), Argentine writer, linguist and literary critic
- Claudia Barrenechea (born 1977), Chilean biathlete
- Enzo Barrenechea (born 2001), Argentine professional footballer
- Julio Barrenechea (1910–1979), Chilean writer, politician and diplomat
- Miguel Barrenechea (born 1947), Mexican sports shooter
- Raúl Porras Barrenechea (1897–1960), Peruvian diplomat, historian and politician
