= Greece at the 1964 Summer Olympics =

- IOC code: GRE
- NOC: Committee of the Olympic Games

in Tokyo Japan
- Competitors: 18 (18 men and 0 women) in 4 sports
- Flag bearer: Georgios Marsellos
- Medals: Gold 0 Silver 0 Bronze 0 Total 0

Summer Olympics appearances (overview)
- 1896; 1900; 1904; 1908; 1912; 1920; 1924; 1928; 1932; 1936; 1948; 1952; 1956; 1960; 1964; 1968; 1972; 1976; 1980; 1984; 1988; 1992; 1996; 2000; 2004; 2008; 2012; 2016; 2020; 2024

Other related appearances
- 1906 Intercalated Games

Greece competed at the 1964 Summer Olympics in Tokyo, Japan. 18 competitors, all men, took part in 16 events in 4 sports. Greek athletes have competed in every Summer Olympic Games.

== Shooting ==
Four shooters represented Greece in 1964.

25 m pistol

- Alkiviadis Papageorgopoulos

50 m pistol

- Lambis Manthos

Trap

- Georgios Pangalos
- Fotios Isaakidis
