= Arturo Porro =

Arturo Porro may refer to:

- Arturo Porro (athlete) (1889–1967), Italian middle-distance runner
- Arturo Porro (sport shooter) (1919–1990), Uruguayan sports shooter
