= Chile at the 1968 Summer Olympics =

- IOC code: CHI
- NOC: Chilean Olympic Committee

in Mexico City
- Competitors: 21 (19 men, 2 women) in 4 sports
- Flag bearer: Rolf Hoppe
- Medals: Gold 0 Silver 0 Bronze 0 Total 0

Summer Olympics appearances (overview)
- ~~1896~~; 1900–1908; 1912; 1920; 1924; 1928; 1932; 1936; 1948; 1952; 1956; 1960; 1964; 1968; 1972; 1976; 1980; 1984; 1988; 1992; 1996; 2000; 2004; 2008; 2012; 2016; 2020; 2024; 2028

Chile competed at the 1968 Summer Olympics in Mexico City, Mexico. 21 competitors, 19 men and 2 women, took part in 19 events in 4 sports.

== Boxing ==
Men's Middleweight (– 75 kg)

- Miguel Villugron
  1. First Round – Lost to Jan van Ispelen (HOL), TKO-2

== Shooting ==
Four shooters, all men, represented Chile in 1968.

Trap

- Juan Enrique Lira
- Pedro Estay

Skeet

- Nicolas Atalah
- Jorge Jottar
