= Lebanon at the 2000 Summer Olympics =

- IOC code: LIB
- NOC: Lebanese Olympic Committee
- Website: www.lebolymp.org

in Sydney
- Competitors: 6 in 4 sports
- Flag bearer: Jean-Claude Rabbath
- Medals: Gold 0 Silver 0 Bronze 0 Total 0

Summer Olympics appearances (overview)
- 1948; 1952; 1956; 1960; 1964; 1968; 1972; 1976; 1980; 1984; 1988; 1992; 1996; 2000; 2004; 2008; 2012; 2016; 2020; 2024

Lebanon competed at the 2000 Summer Olympics in Sydney, Australia.

Sydney 2000 marked the first time the Lebanese Olympic team competed in Australia as Lebanon and other nations boycotted the 1956 Summer Olympics in Melbourne due to the Suez Crisis.

== Athletics ==
Men

Athlete	Event	Qualification		Final	
Athlete	Event	Distance	Position	Distance	Position
Jean Claude Rabbath	High jump	2.15	33	did not advance	

Women

Athlete	Event	Heat		Quarterfinal		Semifinal		Final	
Athlete	Event	Result	Rank	Result	Rank	Result	Rank	Result	Rank
Lina Bejjani	100 m	12.98	7	did not advance					

== Shooting ==
Athlete	Event	Qualification		Final		Total	
Athlete	Event	Points	Rank	Points	Rank	Points	Rank
Joe Salem	Men's Trap	101	39	Did not advance			

== Swimming ==
Men

Athlete	Event	Heat		Semifinal		Final	
Athlete	Event	Time	Rank	Time	Rank	Time	Rank
Ragi Edde	100 m freestyle	59.26	68	did not advance			

Women

Athlete	Event	Heat		Semifinal		Final	
Athlete	Event	Time	Rank	Time	Rank	Time	Rank
Rola El Haress	100 m freestyle	01:03.26	48	did not advance			

== Weightlifting ==
Men

Athlete	Event	Snatch			Clean & Jerk			Total	Rank
Athlete	Event	1	2	3	1	2	3	Total	Rank
Khodor Alaywan	– 85 kg	130.0	~~135.0~~	~~135.0~~	150.0	160.0	~~165.0~~	290.0	19
