= Passera (surname) =

Passera is a surname. Notable people with the surname include:

- Camillo Passera (1965), Italian racing cyclist
- Corrado Passera (1954), Italian manager and banker
- José Passera (1915–1990), Argentine sport shooter
