= Turkey at the 1968 Summer Olympics =

- IOC code: TUR
- NOC: Turkish National Olympic Committee

in Mexico City
- Competitors: 29 (29 men) in 4 sports
- Flag bearer: Gürbüz Lü
- Medals Ranked 21st: Gold 2 Silver 0 Bronze 0 Total 2

Summer Olympics appearances (overview)
- 1908; 1912; 1920; 1924; 1928; 1932; 1936; 1948; 1952; 1956; 1960; 1964; 1968; 1972; 1976; 1980; 1984; 1988; 1992; 1996; 2000; 2004; 2008; 2012; 2016; 2020; 2024

Other related appearances
- 1906 Intercalated Games

Turkey competed at the 1968 Summer Olympics in Mexico City, Mexico. 29 competitors, all men, took part in 29 events in 4 sports.

== Medalists ==
Medal	Name	Sport	Event
Gold	Mahmut Atalay	Wrestling	Men's Freestyle Welterweight
Gold	Ahmet Ayik	Wrestling	Men's Freestyle Light Heavyweight

== Shooting ==
Three shooters, all men, represented Turkey in 1968.

50 m pistol

- Türker Özenbaş

50 m rifle, three positions

- Mehmet Dursun

50 m rifle, prone

- Mehmet Dursun

Trap

- Metin Salihoğlu
