= Lebanon at the 1996 Summer Olympics =

- IOC code: LIB
- NOC: Lebanese Olympic Committee
- Website: www.lebolymp.org

in Atlanta
- Competitors: 1 in 1 sport
- Flag bearer: Mohamed Al-Aywan
- Medals: Gold 0 Silver 0 Bronze 0 Total 0

Summer Olympics appearances (overview)
- 1948; 1952; 1956; 1960; 1964; 1968; 1972; 1976; 1980; 1984; 1988; 1992; 1996; 2000; 2004; 2008; 2012; 2016; 2020; 2024

The West Asian country of Lebanon competed at the 1996 Summer Olympics in Atlanta, United States, which were held from 19 July to 4 August 1996. This appearance marked Lebanon's twelfth appearance in a Summer Games since their debut in 1948. The delegation consisted of one athlete, table tennis player Larissa Chouaib, who finished fourth in her group, failing to win a medal.

== Background ==
The Lebanese Olympic Committee was founded in 1946 and officially recognised by the International Olympic Committee on 22 November 1947. A few months later, the nation made its debut in the 1948 Winter Olympics in St. Moritz, Switzerland. Their debut in a Summer Olympics also came at the 1948 edition in London. Leading up to the 1996 Games, Lebanon had not missed a Summer Games since the 1956 Summer Olympics in Melbourne, Australia, which they boycotted along with Egypt and Iraq in protest of the Suez Crisis. Due to a shortage of athletes at the time, Lebanon did not participate in the 1994 Winter Olympics in Lillehammer, meaning the last time they participated in the Games was the 1992 Summer Games in Barcelona.

The 1996 Summer Olympics were held in Atlanta, United States, from 19 July to 4 August 1996. The Games in Atlanta hosted 10,318 athletes from 197 nations competing in 271 different events. Lebanon's participation in the Games marked their twelfth appearance at a Summer Games. The Lebanese delegation to Atlanta consisted of one athlete: table tennis player Larissa Chouaib. At the opening ceremony, Lebanon's flagbearer was Mohamed Al-Aywan, a weightlifter who competed for the nation at the 1988 Summer Games in the men's 67.5 kg weightlifting event.

== Table tennis ==
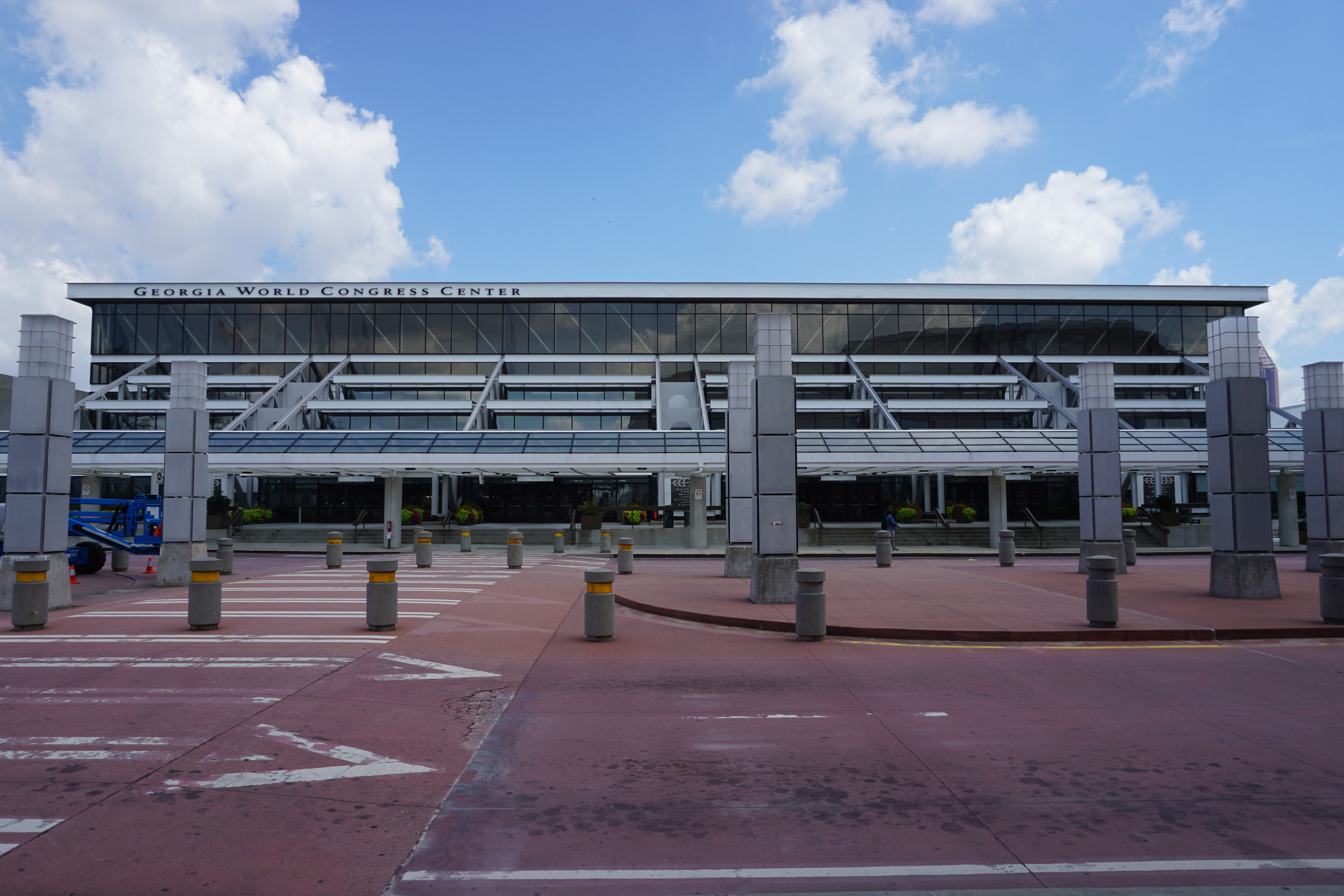
Table tennis events were held at the Georgia World Congress Center in Atlanta

Larissa Chouaib competed in Group C of the women's singles event. Pitted with three other competitors, the player atop the standings after a round-robin tournament would advance to the knockout stage. Her first match was against Chen Jing of Chinese Taipei on 24 July. Chouaib dropped her first game 5–21 and her second 6–21, giving Chen the match win. The following day, Chouaib competed against Chunli Li of New Zealand. Chouaib was again defeated in two games: the first by a score of 7–21 and the second by a score of 5–21. Mathematically eliminated from knockout competition, Chouaib played her final match of the Games on 26 July against Alessia Arisi of Italy. Chouaib dropped the first game 4–21 and the second 13–21. With an 0–3 record, Chouaib placed last in the group. The winner of the group, Chen from Chinese Taipei, went on to win the silver medal in the event after falling to Deng Yaping of China in the gold medal match.

Athlete	Event	Group stage				Round of 16	Quarterfinal	Semifinal	Final / BM	
Athlete	Event	Opposition Result	Opposition Result	Opposition Result	Rank	Opposition Result	Opposition Result	Opposition Result	Opposition Result	Rank
Larissa Chouaib	Women's singles	Chen (TPE); L 0–2	Li (NZL); L 0–2	Arisi (ITA); L 0–2	4	Did not advance				
