= Lebanon at the 1968 Summer Olympics =

- IOC code: LIB
- NOC: Lebanese Olympic Committee

in Mexico City
- Competitors: 11 in 6 sports
- Medals: Gold 0 Silver 0 Bronze 0 Total 0

Summer Olympics appearances (overview)
- 1948; 1952; 1956; 1960; 1964; 1968; 1972; 1976; 1980; 1984; 1988; 1992; 1996; 2000; 2004; 2008; 2012; 2016; 2020; 2024; 2028

Lebanon competed at the 1968 Summer Olympics in Mexico City, Mexico. Eleven competitors, all men, took part in 13 events in 6 sports.

== Cycling ==
1000m time trial

- Tarek Abou Al Dahab — 1:16.18 min (→ 32nd place)

Sprint

- Tarek Abou Al Dahab

- Round 1 — eliminated (→ did not advance)

Individual pursuit

- Tarek Abou Al Dahab

- Heats — 5:35.42 min (→ did not advance)

Individual road race

- Tarek Abou Al Dahab — DNF

== Fencing ==
Three fencers represented Lebanon in 1968.

Men's foil

- Souheil Ayoub — defeated in first round

Men's épée

- Ali Chekr — defeated in first round
- Khalil Kallas — defeated in first round

== Shooting ==
Three shooters represented Lebanon in 1968.

Trap

- Elias Salhab — 191 pts (→ 18th place)

Skeet

- Spiro Hayek — 180 pts (→ 39th place)
- Tanios Harb — 179 pts (→ 41st place)

== Swimming ==
Men

Athlete	Event	Heat		Semifinal		Final	
Athlete	Event	Time	Rank	Time	Rank	Time	Rank
Yacoub Masboungi	100 m freestyle	1:00.5	58	Did not advance			
Yacoub Masboungi	100 m backstroke	1:11.6	34	Did not advance			

== Wrestling ==
Men's Greco-Roman bantamweight (57 kg)

- Jean Nakouzi

- Round 1 — fought Herbert Singerman of Canada
- Round 2 — fought Rodolfo Guerra of Mexico
- Round 3 — fought Arthur Spaenhoven of the Netherlands

Men's Greco-Roman heavyweight (97 kg)

- Hasan Bechara

- Round 1 — fought Petr Kment of Czechoslovakia
- Round 2 — fought Constantin Busoi of Romania
