= Lebanon at the 1992 Summer Olympics =

- IOC code: LIB
- NOC: Lebanese Olympic Committee

in Barcelona
- Competitors: 12 in 7 sports
- Medals: Gold 0 Silver 0 Bronze 0 Total 0

Summer Olympics appearances (overview)
- 1948; 1952; 1956; 1960; 1964; 1968; 1972; 1976; 1980; 1984; 1988; 1992; 1996; 2000; 2004; 2008; 2012; 2016; 2020; 2024

Lebanon competed at the 1992 Summer Olympics in Barcelona, Spain. Twelve competitors, all men, took part in 15 events in 7 sports.

== Competitors ==
The following is the list of number of competitors in the Games.

Sport	Men	Women	Total
Athletics	1	0	1
Cycling	2	0	2
Fencing	2	0	2
Judo	4	0	4
Rowing	1	0	1
Swimming	1	0	1
Weightlifting	1	–	1
Total	12	0	12

== Athletics ==
One athlete represented Lebanon in two events.

- 800 metres – Bassam Kawas (7th place in heat 2 of round 1)
- 1500 metres – Bassam Kawas (11th place in heat 3 of round 1)

== Cycling ==
Two cyclists represented Lebanon in 1992.

Men's road race

- Vatche Zadourian
- Armen Arslanian

== Fencing ==
Two fencers represented Lebanon in 1992.

Men's foil

- Zahi El-Khoury
- Michel Youssef

Men's épée

- Zahi El-Khoury
- Michel Youssef

== Judo ==
Lebanon was represented by four competitors.

- Extra-lightweight – Charbel Chrabie (=35th place)
- Half-lightweight – Assaf El-Murr (=17th place)
- Lightweight – Haji Kahy (=22nd place)
- Half-middleweight – Fadi Saikali (=9th place)

== Rowing ==
One competitor represented Lebanon in two events.

- Single Sculls – Christian Francis (22nd place)

== Swimming ==
One swimmer represented Lebanon in four events.

- 50 metres freestyle – Émile Lahoud (61st place)
- 100 metres freestyle – Émile Lahoud (63rd place)
- 200 metres freestyle – Émile Lahoud (47th place)
- 200 metres individual medley – Émile Lahoud (47th place)

== Weightlifting ==
One competitor represented Lebanon.

- Middle-heavyweight – Hassan El-Kaissi (eliminated)
