= 1910 in Austria-Hungary =

- Decades: 1890s; 1900s; 1910s
- See also: Other events of 1910; Timeline of Austrian history; Timeline of Hungarian history

The following lists events that happened during 1910 in the Austro-Hungarian Empire.

== Events ==
=== February ===
- February 26 - Austria-Hungary grants "most favored nation" status to the United States.

=== March ===
- March 18 - Austria-Hungary signs an agreement with Russia to restore full diplomatic relations.
- March 27 - A fire starts during a barn-dance in Ököritófülpös kills 312 people.

== Births ==
- January 21 – Károly Takács, Hungarian Olympic shooter (d. 1976)
- March 16 – Aladár Gerevich, Hungarian fencer (d. 1991)
- July 12 – Laszlo Szapáry, Austrian sports shooter (d. 1998)
- August 7 – Lucien Hervé, Hungarian-born French photographer (d. 2007)
