= Rudolf Hager =

German sports shooter

Personal information
- Born: 28 April 1941 (age 85) Marzdorf, Germany (now Marcinkowice, Poland)

Sport
- Sport: Sports shooting

Rudolf Hager (born 28 April 1941) is a German former sports shooter. He competed in the trap event at the 1968 Summer Olympics for East Germany.
