= Sten Karlsson =

Swedish sports shooter

Personal information
- Born: 1 January 1936 (age 90) Skepplanda, Sweden

Sport
- Sport: Sports shooting

Sten Karlsson (born 1 January 1936) is a Swedish former sports shooter. He competed in the trap event at the 1968 Summer Olympics.
