= Ahmed Kadry Genena =

Egyptian sport shooter

Personal information
- Born: 17 July 1935 (age 90)

Sport
- Sport: Sports shooting

Ahmed Kadry Genena (born 17 July 1935) is an Egyptian former sports shooter. He competed in the trap event at the 1964 Summer Olympics. He also won a bronze medal at the 1963 Mediterranean Games.
