= Johannes Lamprecht =

Zimbabwean sports shooter (1922–2008)

Personal information
- Born: 22 August 1922
- Died: 25 August 2008 (aged 86)

Sport
- Sport: Sports shooting

Johannes Lamprecht (surname also spelled Lambrecht) (22 August 1922 – 25 August 2008) was a Zimbabwean sports shooter. He competed for Rhodesia in the trap event at the 1964 Summer Olympics.
