= Salvatore Pelliccioni =

Sammarinese sports shooter

Personal information
- Born: 25 January 1933 (age 93) Coriano, Kingdom of Italy

Sport
- Sport: Sports shooting

Salvatore Pelliccioni (born 25 January 1933) is an Italian–born Sammarinese former sports shooter. He competed in the trap event at the 1968 Summer Olympics.
