= José Cusí =

Spanish sports shooter (1934–2026)

- Cusí (left) with Juan Carlos I in 2002

Personal information
- Born: 12 January 1934 Barcelona, Spain
- Died: 19 August 2026 (aged 92) Barcelona, Spain

Sport
- Sport: Sports shooting

José Cusí (12 January 1934 – 19 August 2026) was a Spanish sports shooter. He competed in the trap event at the 1968 Summer Olympics. He was a close friend to King Juan Carlos I of Spain.

Cusí died on 19 August 2026, at the age of 92.
