= Badir Shoukri =

Personal information
- Born: 20 August 1926 Cairo, Egypt

Sport
- Sport: Sports shooting

Badir Shoukri (born 20 August 1926) is an Egyptian former sports shooter. He competed in the trap event at the 1968 Summer Olympics.
