= Jack Rickards =

Zimbabwean sports shooter (1928–1986)

Personal information
- Born: 12 October 1928
- Died: 6 May 1986 (aged 57)

Sport
- Sport: Sports shooting

John Rickards (12 October 1928 – 6 May 1986) was a Zimbabwean sports shooter. He competed for Rhodesia in the trap event at the 1964 Summer Olympics.
