= Lin Wen-chu =

Taiwanese sports shooter

Personal information
- Born: 林 文秀, Pinyin: Lín Wén-xiù; 22 May 1929

Sport
- Sport: Sports shooting

Lin Wen-chu (born 22 May 1929) is a Taiwanese former sports shooter. He competed in the trap event at the 1964 Summer Olympics.
