= Lebanon at the 2020 Summer Olympics =

- IOC code: LBN
- NOC: Lebanese Olympic Committee
- Website: www.lebolymp.org

in Tokyo, Japan July 23, 2021 – August 8, 2021
- Competitors: 6 in 5 sports
- Flag bearers (opening): Ray Bassil; Nacif Elias
- Flag bearer (closing): N/A
- Medals: Gold 0 Silver 0 Bronze 0 Total 0

Summer Olympics appearances (overview)
- 1948; 1952; 1956; 1960; 1964; 1968; 1972; 1976; 1980; 1984; 1988; 1992; 1996; 2000; 2004; 2008; 2012; 2016; 2020; 2024

Lebanon competed at the 2020 Summer Olympics in Tokyo. Originally scheduled to take place from 24 July to 9 August 2020, the Games were postponed to 23 July to 8 August 2021, because of the COVID-19 pandemic.

It was the nation's eighteenth appearance at the Summer Olympics. Lebanon did not attend the 1956 Summer Olympics in Melbourne as a response to the Suez Crisis. During the opening ceremony countries marched in the order of traditional Japanese characters using Gojūon script and Russia was removed from the standard list due to doping sanctions, Lebanon was placed last in the parade of nations before 2028 host nation United States and 2024 host nation France, and as well as the host nation Japan.

== Competitors ==
The following is the list of number of competitors in the Games.

Sport	Men	Women	Total
Athletics	1	0	1
Judo	1	0	1
Shooting	0	1	1
Swimming	1	1	2
Weightlifting	0	1	1
Total	3	3	6

== Athletics ==
Lebanon received a universality slot from the World Athletics to send a male track and field athlete to the Olympics.

Key

- Note–Ranks given for track events are within the athlete's heat only
- Q = Qualified for the next round
- q = Qualified for the next round as a fastest loser or, in field events, by position without achieving the qualifying target
- NR = National record
- N/A = Round not applicable for the event
- Bye = Athlete not required to compete in round

Track & road events

Athlete	Event	Heat		Semifinal		Final	
Athlete	Event	Result	Rank	Result	Rank	Result	Rank
Noureddine Hadid	Men's 200 m	21.12	8	Did not advance			

== Judo ==
Lebanon entered one male judoka into the Olympic tournament based on the International Judo Federation Olympics Individual Ranking.

Athlete	Event	Round of 64	Round of 32	Round of 16	Quarterfinals	Semifinals	Repechage	Final / BM	
Athlete	Event	Opposition Result	Opposition Result	Opposition Result	Opposition Result	Opposition Result	Opposition Result	Opposition Result	Rank
Nacif Elias	Men's −81 kg	Bye	Lee S-h (KOR); L 00–10	Did not advance					

== Shooting ==
Lebanese shooters achieved a quota place for the following event by virtue of her best finish at the 2018 ISSF World Championships, the 2019 ISSF World Cup series, and Asian Championships, as long as they obtained a minimum qualifying score (MQS) by May 31, 2020.

Athlete	Event	Qualification		Final	
Athlete	Event	Points	Rank	Points	Rank
Ray Bassil	Women's trap	114	21	Did not advance	

== Swimming ==
Lebanon received a universality invitation from FINA to send two top-ranked swimmers (one per gender) in their respective individual events to the Olympics, based on the FINA Points System of June 28, 2021.

Athlete	Event	Heat		Semifinal		Final	
Athlete	Event	Time	Rank	Time	Rank	Time	Rank
Munzer Kabbara	Men's 200 m individual medley	2:03.08	41	Did not advance			
Gabriella Doueihy	Women's 200 m freestyle	2:11.29	29	Did not advance			

== Weightlifting ==
Lebanon entered one female weightlifter into the Olympic competition, signifying the nation's return to the sport for the first time since Sydney 2000. Mahassen Fattouh topped the list of weightlifters from Asia in the women's 76 kg category based on the IWF Absolute Continental Rankings.

Athlete	Event	Snatch		Clean & Jerk		Total	Rank
Athlete	Event	Result	Rank	Result	Rank	Total	Rank
Mahassen Fattouh	Women's –76 kg	93	11	124	7	217	9
