= Dipya Mongkollugsana =

Thai sports shooter (1918–1984)

Personal information
- Born: 12 October 1918 Nakhon Pathom, Thailand
- Died: 14 January 1984 (aged 65)

Sport
- Sport: Sports shooting

Dipya Mongkollugsana (Thai: ทิพย์ มงคลลักษณ์, 12 October 1918 – 14 January 1984) was a Thai oral surgeon, naval commander (as of 1969) and former sports shooter. He attended a Fulbright fellowship at the Ohio State University in 1952. He is a founding member of the Skeet & Trap Shooting Association of Thailand, and competed in the trap event at the 1968 Summer Olympics.
