= José Luis Alonso Berbegal =

Spanish sports shooter (1927–1993)

Personal information
- Born: 25 February 1927 Zaragoza, Spain
- Died: 30 March 1993 (aged 66)

Sport
- Sport: Sports shooting

José Luis Alonso Berbegal (25 February 1927 – 30 March 1993) was a Spanish sports shooter. He competed in the trap event at the 1964 Summer Olympics. Berbegal died on 30 March 1993, at the age of 66.
