= Heinz Rehder =

German sports shooter

Personal information
- Born: 19 March 1916 Magdeburg, Germany

Sport
- Sport: Sports shooting
- Event: Trap shooting

Heinz Rehder (born 19 March 1916) was a German sports shooter. He competed in the trap event at the 1964 Summer Olympics.
