= George Silvernail =

Puerto Rican sports shooter

Personal information
- Born: 16 January 1928 Florida, Buenos Aires, Argentina
- Died: 6 March 2015 (aged 87)

Sport
- Sport: Sports shooting

George Silvernail (16 January 1928 – 6 March 2015) was a Puerto Rican sports shooter. He competed in the trap event at the 1968 Summer Olympics.
