= William Morris (American sport shooter) =

American sport shooter (born 1939)

Personal information
- Born: June 27, 1939 (age 87) Fairfax, Oklahoma, United States

Sport
- Sport: Sports shooting
- Event: Trap Shooting
Medal record
Men's shooting
Representing United States
Olympic Games
Bronze medal – third place	1964 Tokyo	Trap

William Morris (born June 27, 1939) is an American sports shooter and was an officer in the United States Army when he won the bronze medal in the 1964 Summer Olympics. This was the first medal won in this sport for the US in 40 years. He is a graduate of the University of Oklahoma.
