= Fencing at the 1963 Mediterranean Games =

Fencing competition

- Location: Naples, Italy
- Dates: September 1963

The fencing competition at the 1963 Mediterranean Games was held in Naples, Italy.

Unlike the first three editions of the Mediterranean Games, there were no team events this time.

== Medalists ==
Event	Gold	Silver	Bronze
Individual épée	Yves Dreyfus (FRA)	Claude Bourquard (FRA)	Giovanni Battista Breda (ITA)
Individual foil	Jean-Claude Magnan (FRA)	Pasquale La Ragione (ITA)	Jacky Courtillat (FRA)
Individual sabre	Wladimiro Calarese (ITA)	Jean-Ernest Ramez (FRA)	Claude Arabo (FRA)

== Medal table ==
Rank	Nation	Gold	Silver	Bronze	Total
1	France (FRA)	2	2	2	6
2	Italy (ITA)	1	1	1	3
Totals (2 entries)		3	3	3	9
