= Lebanon at the 2012 Summer Olympics =

- IOC code: LIB
- NOC: Lebanese Olympic Committee
- Website: www.lebolymp.org

in London
- Competitors: 10 in 7 sports
- Flag bearer: Andrea Paoli
- Medals: Gold 0 Silver 0 Bronze 0 Total 0

Summer Olympics appearances (overview)
- 1948; 1952; 1956; 1960; 1964; 1968; 1972; 1976; 1980; 1984; 1988; 1992; 1996; 2000; 2004; 2008; 2012; 2016; 2020; 2024

Lebanon competed at the 2012 Summer Olympics in London, from 27 July to 12 August 2012. This was the nation's sixteenth appearance at the Olympics, except the 1956 Summer Olympics in Melbourne as a response to the Suez Crisis.

The Lebanese Olympic Committee sent the nation's largest delegation to the Games, after the 1992 Summer Olympics in Barcelona. A total of 10 athletes, 3 men and 7 women, competed in 7 different sports. For the first time in its Olympic history, Lebanon was represented by more female than male athletes. Three of its athletes were born in the United States: foil fencers and siblings Zain and Mona Shaito, and freestyle swimmer Katya Bachrouche. Two other athletes had competed in Beijing, including sprinter Gretta Taslakian, who was at her third consecutive Olympics. Asian Games silver medalist Andrea Paoli, who became the first Lebanese taekwondo jin to participate in the Olympics, was the nation's flag bearer at the opening ceremony.

Lebanon, however, failed to win an Olympic medal in London since the 1980 Summer Olympics in Moscow, where Hassan Bchara won the bronze for Greco-Roman wrestling.

== Athletics ==
Lebanon has qualified 2 athletes.

Key
- Note–Ranks given for track events are within the athlete's heat only
- Q = Qualified for the next round
- q = Qualified for the next round as a fastest loser or, in field events, by position without achieving the qualifying target
- NR = National record
- N/A = Round not applicable for the event
- Bye = Athlete not required to compete in round

Men

Athlete	Event	Heat		Semifinal		Final	
Athlete	Event	Result	Rank	Result	Rank	Result	Rank
Ahmad Hazer	110 m hurdles	14.82	9	Did not advance			

Women

Athlete	Event	Heat		Semifinal		Final	
Athlete	Event	Result	Rank	Result	Rank	Result	Rank
Gretta Taslakian	200 m	24.49	8	Did not advance			

== Fencing ==
Lebanon has qualified 2 fencers.

Men

Athlete	Event	Round of 64	Round of 32	Round of 16	Quarterfinal	Semifinal	Final / BM	
Athlete	Event	Opposition Score	Opposition Score	Opposition Score	Opposition Score	Opposition Score	Opposition Score	Rank
Zain Shaito	Individual foil	Zhu J (CHN); L 2–15	Did not advance					

Women

Athlete	Event	Round of 64	Round of 32	Round of 16	Quarterfinal	Semifinal	Final / BM	
Athlete	Event	Opposition Score	Opposition Score	Opposition Score	Opposition Score	Opposition Score	Opposition Score	Rank
Mona Shaito	Individual foil	El-Gammal (EGY); W 7–6	Di Francisca (ITA); L 2–15	Did not advance				

== Judo ==
Lebanon has had 1 judoka invited.

Athlete	Event	Round of 32	Round of 16	Quarterfinals	Semifinals	Repechage	Final / BM	
Athlete	Event	Opposition Result	Opposition Result	Opposition Result	Opposition Result	Opposition Result	Opposition Result	Rank
Caren Chammas	Women's −63 kg	Willeboordse (NED); L 1100–0000	Did not advance					

== Shooting ==
Women

Athlete	Event	Qualification		Final	
Athlete	Event	Points	Rank	Points	Rank
Ray Bassil	Trap	64	18	Did not advance	

== Swimming ==
Lebanese swimmers have so far achieved qualifying standards in the following events (up to a maximum of 2 swimmers in each event at the Olympic Qualifying Time (OQT), and potentially 1 at the Olympic Selection Time (OST)):

Men

Athlete	Event	Heat		Semifinal		Final	
Athlete	Event	Time	Rank	Time	Rank	Time	Rank
Wael Koubrousli	100 m breaststroke	1:07.06	44	Did not advance			

Women

Athlete	Event	Heat		Final	
Athlete	Event	Time	Rank	Time	Rank
Katya Bachrouche	800 m freestyle	8:35.88	19	Did not advance	

== Table tennis ==
Lebanon qualified one woman.

Athlete	Event	Preliminary round	Round 1	Round 2	Round 3	Round 4	Quarterfinals	Semifinals	Final / BM	
Athlete	Event	Opposition Result	Opposition Result	Opposition Result	Opposition Result	Opposition Result	Opposition Result	Opposition Result	Opposition Result	Rank
Tvin Carole Moumjoghlian	Women's singles	Hanffou (CMR); L 0–4	Did not advance							

== Taekwondo ==
Lebanon has qualified the following quota place.

Athlete	Event	Round of 16	Quarterfinals	Semifinals	Repechage	Bronze Medal	Final	
Athlete	Event	Opposition Result	Opposition Result	Opposition Result	Opposition Result	Opposition Result	Opposition Result	Rank
Andrea Paoli	Women's −57 kg	Munoz (CUB); W 4–2	Tseng L-C (TPE); L 2–5	Did not advance				

== See also ==
- Lebanon at the 2012 Summer Paralympics
