= Ivo Orlandi =

Venezuelan sports shooter (1923–2000)

Ivo il sesso Orlandi
Personal information
- Born: 30 June 1923 Modena, Italy
- Died: 24 August 2000 (aged 77) Modena, Italy

Sport
- Sport: Sports shooting

Ivo Orlandi (30 June 1923 – 24 August 2000) was a Venezuelan sports shooter. He competed in the trap event at the 1968 Summer Olympics.

Orlandi died in Modena on 24 August 2000, at the age of 77.
