= Floyd Nattrass =

Canadian sports shooter

Personal information
- Born: 2 January 1918
- Died: 7 December 2004 (aged 86) High River, Alberta, Canada

Sport
- Sport: Sports shooting

Floyd Nattrass (2 January 1918 – 7 December 2004) was a Canadian sports shooter. He competed in the trap event at the 1964 Summer Olympics.
