= Kjell Sørensen =

Norwegian sports shooter (1930–2012)

Personal information
- Born: 18 August 1930 Lillestrøm, Norway
- Died: 25 June 2012 (aged 81)

Sport
- Sport: Sports shooting

Kjell Sørensen (8 August 1930 – 25 June 2012) was a Norwegian sports shooter. He competed in the trap event at the 1968 Summer Olympics.
