= Juan Ángel Martini Jr. =

Argentine sports shooter

Juan Angel Martini Jr.
Personal information
- Born: 5 August 1945 (age 80) Buenos Aires, Argentina

Sport
- Sport: Sports shooting

Juan Angel Martini Jr. (born 5 August 1945) is an Argentine former sports shooter. He competed in the trap event at the 1968 Summer Olympics. His father also competed at the Olympics as a sports shooter.
