= Jean-Ernest Ramez =

French fencer (1932–2020)

Personal information
- Born: 15 May 1932 Prisches, France
- Died: 17 November 2020 (aged 88) Crolles, France

Sport
- Sport: Fencing
Medal record
Representing France
World Championships
Bronze medal – third place	1965 Paris	Team sabre
Bronze medal – third place	1967 Montreal	Team sabre
Summer Universiade
Bronze medal – third place	1959 Turin	Individual sabre
Mediterranean Games
Gold medal – first place	1959 Beirut	Individual sabre
Gold medal – first place	1959 Beirut	Team sabre
Silver medal – second place	1963 Naples	Individual sabre

Jean-Ernest Hippolyte Ramez (15 May 1932 – 17 November 2020) was a French fencer. He competed in the team sabre events at the 1964 and 1968 Summer Olympics.

He also competed at the Mediterranean Games in 1959, where he won gold medals in the individual and team sabre events, and in 1963, where he won a silver medal in the individual sabre event.
