= Lebanon at the 2024 Summer Olympics =

- IOC code: LBN
- NOC: Lebanese Olympic Committee
- Website: www.lebolymp.org

in Paris, France 26 July 2024 – 11 August 2024
- Competitors: 10 (6 men and 4 women) in 8 sports
- Flag bearers: Simon Doueihy; Laetitia Aoun
- Medals: Gold 0 Silver 0 Bronze 0 Total 0

Summer Olympics appearances (overview)
- 1948; 1952; 1956; 1960; 1964; 1968; 1972; 1976; 1980; 1984; 1988; 1992; 1996; 2000; 2004; 2008; 2012; 2016; 2020; 2024

Lebanon competed at the 2024 Summer Olympics in Paris, France from 26 July to 11 August 2024. It signified the nation's nineteenth participation at the Summer Olympics.

== Competitors ==
The following is the list of number of competitors in the Games.

Sport	Men	Women	Total
Athletics	1	0	1
Fencing	1	0	1
Judo	1	0	1
Shooting	0	1	1
Swimming	1	1	2
Table tennis	0	1	1
Taekwondo	0	1	1
Tennis	2	0	2
Total	6	4	10

== Athletics ==
Lebanon had been due to send one sprinter to compete at the 2024 Summer Olympics. However, Noureddine Hadid was arrested at Beirut Airport on 4 July 2024 as he was considered a deserter from the Lebanese Army. Despite appeals from the Lebanese Athletics Federation the army insisted that Hadid would not be allowed to compete, meaning that Lebanon had no competitors in Olympic athletics events for the first time since the 1996 Summer Olympics.

== Fencing ==
For the first time since 2016, Lebanon entered one fencer into the Olympic competition. Philippe Wakim secured his spot after receiving the tripartite invitation quotas for men's individual foil event.

Athlete	Event	Round of 64	Round of 32	Round of 16	Quarterfinal	Semifinal	Final / BM	
Athlete	Event	Opposition Score	Opposition Score	Opposition Score	Opposition Score	Opposition Score	Opposition Score	Rank
Philippe Wakim	Men's foil	Chen Y-t (TPE); L 13–15	Did not advance					

== Judo ==
Lebanon qualified one judoka for the following weight class at the Games. Caramnob Sagaipov (men's middleweight, 90 kg) got qualified via continental quota based on Olympic point rankings.

Athlete	Event	Round of 32	Round of 16	Quarterfinals	Semifinals	Repechage	Final / BM	
Athlete	Event	Opposition Result	Opposition Result	Opposition Result	Opposition Result	Opposition Result	Opposition Result	Rank
Caramnob Sagaipov	Men's −90 kg	Ivanov (BUL); L 00–01	Did not advance					

== Shooting ==
Lebanese trap shooter Ray Bassil achieved a quota place for the following event by virtue of her best finish at the 2023 Asian Shooting Championships.

Athlete	Event	Qualification		Final	
Athlete	Event	Points	Rank	Points	Rank
Ray Bassil	Women's trap	114	21	Did not advance	

== Swimming ==
Lebanon received a universality invitation from World Aquatics to send two top-ranked swimmers (one per gender) in their respective individual events to the Olympics, based on the FINA Points System of June 23, 2024.

Athlete	Event	Heat		Semifinal		Final	
Athlete	Event	Time	Rank	Time	Rank	Time	Rank
Simon Doueihy	Men's 100 m freestyle	50.10	42	Did not advance			
Lynn El Hajj	Women's 100 m breaststroke	1:10.27	31	Did not advance			

== Table tennis ==
For the first time since 2016, Lebanon entered one athlete into the games. Mariana Sahakian secured her spot at the Games via winning the gold medal for women's single event, through the 2024 Western Asia Qualification Tournament in Sulaymaniyah, Iraq.

Athlete	Event	Preliminary	Round of 64	Round of 32	Round of 16	Quarterfinals	Semifinals	Final / BM	
Athlete	Event	Opposition Result	Opposition Result	Opposition Result	Opposition Result	Opposition Result	Opposition Result	Opposition Result	Rank
Mariana Sahakian	Women's singles	Zeng (CHI); W 4–1	Zhang (USA); L 0–4	Did not advance					

== Taekwondo ==
For the first time since 2012, Lebanon qualified one athlete to compete at the games. Laetitia Aoun qualified for the games, following the triumph of her victory in the semifinal rounds in her class, at the 2024 Asian Qualification Tournament in Tai'an, China.

Athlete	Event	Round of 16	Quarterfinals	Semifinals	Repechage	Final / BM	
Athlete	Event	Opposition Result	Opposition Result	Opposition Result	Opposition Result	Opposition Result	Rank
Laetitia Aoun	Women's −57 kg	Chia-ling (TPE); W 2–0 (4–2, 3–2)	Reljiḱ (MKD); W 2–0 (9–8, 6–6)	Kiani (IRI); L 0–2 (3–10, 0–9)	Bye	Park (CAN); L 0–2 (3–0, 2–4)	5

== Tennis ==
Lebanon entered two tennis players into the games. Benjamin Hassan will represent the nations at the games by virtue of the universality spots allocations results; marking the nations debut at these sports.

Athlete	Event	Round of 64	Round of 32	Round of 16	Quarterfinals	Semifinals	Final / BM	
Athlete	Event	Opposition Score	Opposition Score	Opposition Score	Opposition Score	Opposition Score	Opposition Score	Rank
Benjamin Hassan	Singles	Eubanks (USA); W 6–4, 6–2	Báez (ARG); L 2–6, 6–3, 6–7^{(3–7)}	Did not advance				
Hady Habib	Singles	Alcaraz (ESP); L 3–6, 1–6	Did not advance					
Benjamin Hassan; Hady Habib	Doubles	—N/a	Ebden / Peers (AUS); L 6–7^{(5–7)}, 2–6	Did not advance				
