= Lebanon at the 1976 Summer Olympics =

- IOC code: LIB
- NOC: Lebanese Olympic Committee

in Montreal
- Competitors: 2
- Medals: Gold 0 Silver 0 Bronze 0 Total 0

Summer Olympics appearances (overview)
- 1948; 1952; 1956; 1960; 1964; 1968; 1972; 1976; 1980; 1984; 1988; 1992; 1996; 2000; 2004; 2008; 2012; 2016; 2020; 2024

Lebanon competed at the 1976 Summer Olympics in Montreal, Quebec, Canada.

== Results by event ==
=== Athletics ===
Men's Long Jump

- Ghassan Faddoul

- Qualification — NM (→ did not advance)

=== Judo ===
Men's Lightweight - 63kg

- David Saad

- Qualification — Pool B (→ did not advance)
