= Goh Tai Yong =

Malaysian sports shooter

Personal information
- Born: 24 December 1939 (age 86)

Sport
- Sport: Sports shooting

Goh Tai Yong (born 24 December 1939) is a Malaysian former sports shooter. He competed in the trap event at the 1964 Summer Olympics.
