= Rodolfo Guarnieri =

Argentine sports shooter (1927–2019)

Personal information
- Born: 29 October 1927 Córdoba, Argentina
- Died: 22 September 2019 (aged 91)

Sport
- Sport: Sports shooting

Rodolfo Guarnieri (29 October 1927 – 22 September 2019) was an Argentine sports shooter. He competed in the trap event at the 1968 Summer Olympics.
