= Eric Grantham =

British sports shooter

Personal information
- Born: 7 September 1913 Yorkshire, England
- Died: 19 July 1989 (aged 75) Beverley, Yorkshire, England

Sport
- Sport: Sports shooting

Eric Grantham (7 September 1913 – 19 July 1989) was a British sports shooter. He competed in the trap event at the 1968 Summer Olympics.
