= Guy Barrabino =

French fencer (1934–2017)

Personal information
- Born: 17 January 1934 Alexandria, Egypt
- Died: 10 November 2017 (aged 83) Monaco

Sport
- Sport: Fencing
Medal record
Representing France
Mediterranean Games
Gold medal – first place	1959 Beirut	Team foil
Bronze medal – third place	1959 Beirut	Individual foil
World Championships
Bronze medal – third place	1963 Gdansk	Team foil
Summer Universiade
Gold medal – first place	1959 Turin	Individual foil
Bronze medal – third place	1959 Turin	Team foil

Guy Barrabino (17 January 1934 – 10 November 2017) was a French fencer. He competed in the team foil event at the 1960 Summer Olympics. He also competed at the 1959 Mediterranean Games where he won a gold medal in the team foil event and a bronze medal in the individual foil event.
