= Jaime Loyola =

Puerto Rican sports shooter

Personal information
- Born: 27 May 1931 Santurce, Puerto Rico
- Died: 23 May 1993 (aged 61) Guaynabo, Puerto Rico

Sport
- Sport: Sports shooting

Jaime Loyola (27 May 1931 – 23 May 1993) was a Puerto Rican sports shooter. He competed in the trap event at the 1964 Summer Olympics. He was also a bronze medalist at the 1955 Pan American Games in trap shooting.

Loyola was also a top skeet shooter. He competed at the Central American and Caribbean Games several times, being a gold medalist in the event in 1954, a silver in 1959, a bronze in 1962 and a bronze in 1966. He won the Puerto Rican Governor's Cup championship at least five times and also won multiple competitions competing in the U.S.
