= Erich Gehmann =

German sports shooter (born 1922)

Personal information
- Born: 15 May 1922 Müllheim, Germany

Sport
- Sport: Sports shooting

Erich Gehmann (born 15 May 1922) is a German former sports shooter. He competed in the trap event at the 1968 Summer Olympics for West Germany.
