= Park Sam-gyu =

South Korean sport shooter

Personal information
- Born: 6 February 1932

Sport
- Sport: Sports shooting

Korean name
- Hangul: 박삼규
- Hanja: 朴三奎
- RR: Bak Samgyu
- MR: Pak Samgyu

Park Sam-gyu (Korean: 박삼규; born 6 February 1932) is a former South Korean sports shooter. He competed in the trap event at the 1964 Summer Olympics.
