= Armen Arslanian =

Lebanese cyclist (1960–2015)

Personal information
- Born: 9 July 1960
- Died: 18 April 2015 (aged 54) Antwerp, Belgium

Cycling career
- Sport: Cycling

Armen Arslanian (Arabic: أرمين أرسلانيان) (9 July 1960 – 18 May 2015) was a Lebanese cyclist. Arslanian represented his nation at the highest international competitions during the 1990s including at the 1992 Summer Olympics and UCI Road World Championships.

== Biography ==
Arslanian was born on 9 July 1960. From the early 1980s he lived in exile in Antwerp, Belgium.

He represented Lebanon at the 1992 Summer Olympics in Barcelona in the men's individual road race. The following years he also competed at the 1993 UCI Road World Championships and 1994 UCI Road World Championships.

Arslanian died on 18 April 2025 in Antwerp at the age of 54. He was buried in Antwerp.
