= Lebanon at the 2016 Summer Olympics =

- IOC code: LIB
- NOC: Lebanese Olympic Committee
- Website: www.lebolymp.org

in Rio de Janeiro
- Competitors: 9 in 7 sports
- Flag bearer: Nacif Elias
- Medals: Gold 0 Silver 0 Bronze 0 Total 0

Summer Olympics appearances (overview)
- 1948; 1952; 1956; 1960; 1964; 1968; 1972; 1976; 1980; 1984; 1988; 1992; 1996; 2000; 2004; 2008; 2012; 2016; 2020; 2024

Lebanon competed at the 2016 Summer Olympics in Rio de Janeiro, Brazil, from 5 to 21 August 2016. This was the nation's 17th appearance at the Summer Olympics. Lebanon did not attend the 1956 Summer Olympics in Melbourne, as a response to the Suez Crisis.

The Lebanese Olympic Committee sent a total of nine athletes, four men and five women, to compete in seven sports at the Games. The Lebanese team featured two returning Olympians from London 2012: American-born foil fencer Mona Shaito and world's top-ranked shooter Ray Bassil in the women's trap. Almost half of the roster, including Bassil and slalom canoeist Richard Merjan, were granted invitations by the Tripartite Commission to the Games, due to their recent achievements. Meanwhile, half-middleweight judoka and Brazil-raised athlete Nacif Elias, who was later disqualified for an allegedly illegal joint lock on Argentina's Emmanuel Lucenti in his opening bout, led the Lebanese squad as the nation's flag bearer in the opening ceremony.

Lebanon, however, failed to win its first Olympic medal, since the 1980 Summer Olympics in Moscow, where Greco-Roman wrestler Hassan Bchara took the bronze in the super heavyweight category.

== Athletics ==
Lebanese athletes have so far achieved qualifying standards in the following athletics events (up to a maximum of 3 athletes in each event):

Key

- Note–Ranks given for track events are within the athlete's heat only
- Q = Qualified for the next round
- q = Qualified for the next round as a fastest loser or, in field events, by position without achieving the qualifying target
- NR = National record
- N/A = Round not applicable for the event
- Bye = Athlete not required to compete in round

Track & road events

Athlete	Event	Heat		Semifinal		Final	
Athlete	Event	Result	Rank	Result	Rank	Result	Rank
Ahmad Hazer	Men's 110 m hurdles	15.50	7	Did not advance			
Chirine Njeim	Women's marathon	—N/a				2:51:08	109

== Canoeing ==
=== Slalom ===
Lebanon received an invitation from the Tripartite Commission to send Richard Merjan in the men's C-1 race, signifying the nation's Olympic debut in the sport.

Athlete	Event	Preliminary						Semifinal		Final	
Athlete	Event	Run 1	Rank	Run 2	Rank	Best	Rank	Time	Rank	Time	Rank
Richard Merjan	Men's C-1	120.20	18	121.67	16	120.20	19	Did not advance			

== Fencing ==
Lebanon entered one fencer into the Olympic competition. London 2012 Olympian Mona Shaito secured a spot in the women's foil as one of the two highest-ranked fencers from Asia outside the world's top 14 in the FIE Adjusted Official Rankings. She lost in her first bout.

Athlete	Event	Round of 64	Round of 32	Round of 16	Quarterfinal	Semifinal	Final / BM	
Athlete	Event	Opposition Score	Opposition Score	Opposition Score	Opposition Score	Opposition Score	Opposition Score	Rank
Mona Shaito	Women's foil	Bye	Kiefer (USA); L 3–15	Did not advance				

== Judo ==
Lebanon qualified one judoka for the men's half-middleweight category (81 kg) at the Games. Nacif Elias was ranked among the top 22 eligible judokas for men in the IJF World Ranking List of 30 May 2016. He lost in his first match.

Athlete	Event	Round of 64	Round of 32	Round of 16	Quarterfinals	Semifinals	Repechage	Final / BM	
Athlete	Event	Opposition Result	Opposition Result	Opposition Result	Opposition Result	Opposition Result	Opposition Result	Opposition Result	Rank
Nacif Elias	Men's −81 kg	Bye	Lucenti (ARG); L 000–100	Did not advance					

== Shooting ==
Lebanon received an invitation from the Tripartite Commission to send London 2012 Olympian Ray Bassil in the women's trap, as long as the minimum qualifying score (MQS) was met by March 31, 2016. She failed to advance past the preliminary round.

Athlete	Event	Qualification		Semifinal		Final	
Athlete	Event	Points	Rank	Points	Rank	Points	Rank
Ray Bassil	Women's trap	65	14	Did not advance			

Qualification Legend: Q = Qualify for the next round; q = Qualify for the bronze medal (shotgun)

== Swimming ==
Lebanon received a Universality invitation from FINA to send two swimmers (one male and one female) to the Olympics. Both swimmers failed to advance past the preliminary round.

Athlete	Event	Heat		Semifinal		Final	
Athlete	Event	Time	Rank	Time	Rank	Time	Rank
Anthony Barbar	Men's 50 m freestyle	23.77	50	Did not advance			
Gabrielle Doueihy	Women's 400 m freestyle	4:31.21	31	—N/a		Did not advance	

== Table tennis ==
Lebanon entered one athlete into the table tennis competition at the Games. Mariana Sahakian secured the Olympic spot in the women's singles as the highest-ranked table tennis player coming from the West Asia zone at the Asian Qualification Tournament in Hong Kong. She lost and was eliminated in her first match.

Athlete	Event	Preliminary	Round 1	Round 2	Round 3	Round of 16	Quarterfinals	Semifinals	Final / BM	
Athlete	Event	Opposition Result	Opposition Result	Opposition Result	Opposition Result	Opposition Result	Opposition Result	Opposition Result	Opposition Result	Rank
Mariana Sahakian	Women's singles	Oshonaike (NGR); L 3–4	Did not advance							
