= Gustavo Zepeda =

Mexican sport shooter

Personal information
- Born: 12 June 1923 Mexico City, Mexico
- Died: 29 October 2010 (aged 87)

Sport
- Sport: Sports shooting

Gustavo Zepeda Carranza (12 June 1923 – 29 October 2010) was a Mexican sport shooter. He competed in the trap event at the 1968 Summer Olympics.
