= Cheng Sung-gun =

Taiwanese sports shooter

Personal information
- Full name: 鄭 松根, Pinyin: Zhèng Sōng-gēn
- Born: 20 December 1929 Pingtung, Taiwan

Sport
- Sport: Sports shooting

Cheng Sung-gun (born 20 December 1929) is a Taiwanese former sports shooter. He competed in the trap event at the 1968 Summer Olympics.
