= Edward Shaske =

Canadian sports shooter (1927–2021)

Personal information
- Born: 20 December 1927 Edmonton, Alberta, Canada
- Died: 28 December 2021 (aged 94) Edmonton, Alberta, Canada

Sport
- Sport: Sports shooting

Edward Shaske (20 December 1927 – 28 December 2021) was a Canadian sports shooter. He competed in the trap event at the 1968 Summer Olympics. Shaske died on 28 December 2021, at the age of 94.
