= St. Francis, Kansas =

City in Cheyenne County, Kansas

- City and County seat
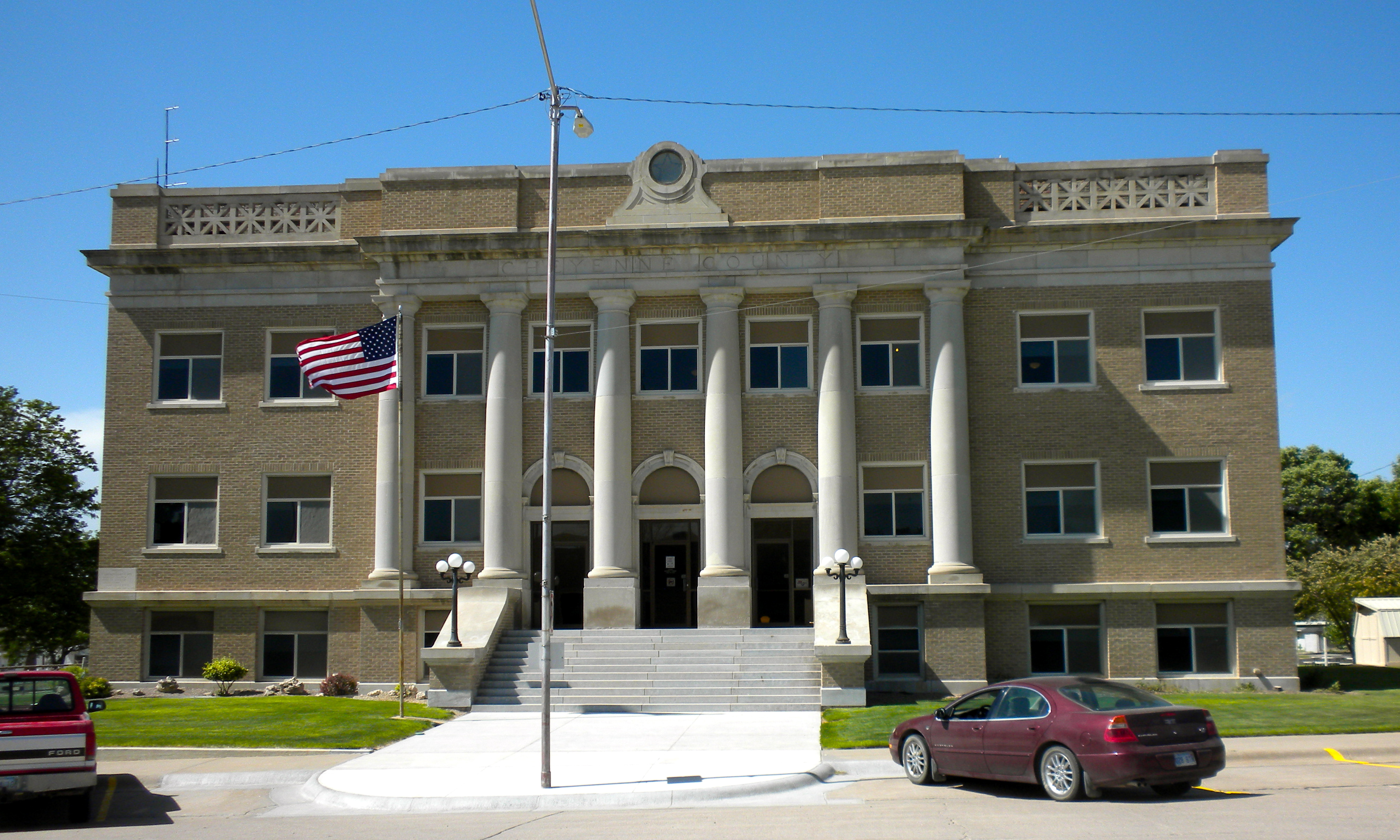
- Cheyenne County Courthouse (2010)

- Location within Cheyenne County and Kansas

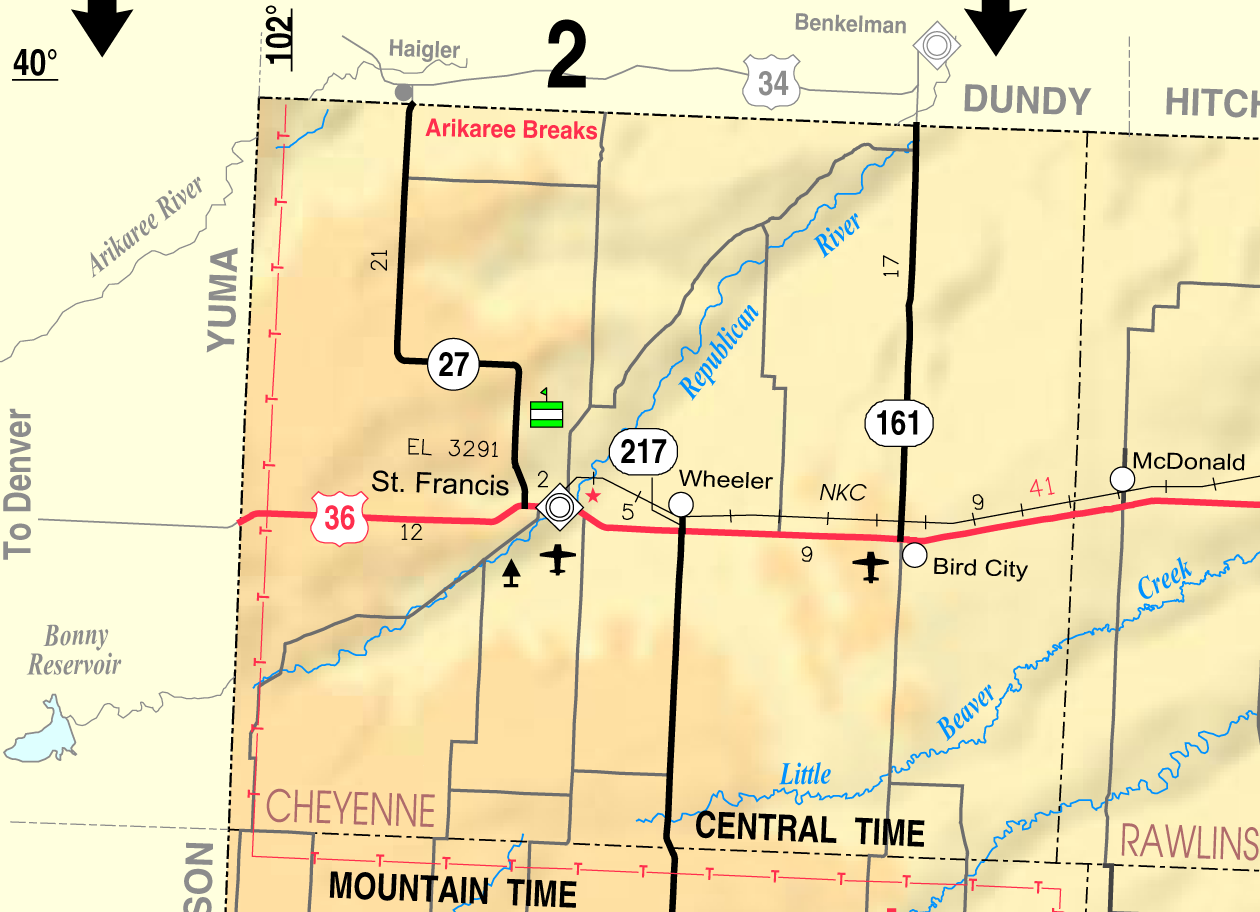
- KDOT map of Cheyenne County (legend)
- Coordinates: 39°46′17″N 101°48′05″W
- Country: United States
- State: Kansas
- County: Cheyenne
- Founded: 1887
- Incorporated: 1903

Area
  - Total: 0.86 sq mi (2.22 km^{2})
  - Land: 0.86 sq mi (2.22 km^{2})
  - Water: 0 sq mi (0.00 km^{2})
- Elevation: 3,320 ft (1,010 m)

Population (2020)
  - Total: 1,263
  - Density: 1,470/sq mi (569/km^{2})
- Time zone: UTC-6 (CST)
  - Summer (DST): UTC-5 (CDT)
- ZIP Code: 67756
- Area code: 785
- FIPS code: 20-62175
- GNIS ID: 2396488
- Website: stfranciskansas.com

St. Francis is a city in and the county seat of Cheyenne County, Kansas, United States. As of the 2020 census, the population of the city was 1,263.

== History ==
St. Francis was founded in 1887. The city may have been named for the wife of its founder.

In June 1903, a total of eight people were killed near St. Francis in a conflict over a cattle fence. The Berry family had taken to cutting the fence to gain access to the road to town. Cattlemen employed by the Dewar Cattle Company came across the family while they were cutting the fence. They attacked, pursuing the settlers to their home. In total, five members of the Berry family were killed along with three cowboys.

== Geography ==
According to the United States Census Bureau, the city has a total area of 0.87 square miles (2.25 km^{2}), all land.

=== Climate ===
St. Francis experiences a semi-arid climate (Köppen BSk) with cold, dry winters and hot, wetter summers.

Climate data for St. Francis, Kansas, 1991–2020 normals, extremes 1908–present
| Month | Jan | Feb | Mar | Apr | May | Jun | Jul | Aug | Sep | Oct | Nov | Dec | Year |
|---|---|---|---|---|---|---|---|---|---|---|---|---|---|
| Record high °F (°C) | 81 (27) | 83 (28) | 92 (33) | 97 (36) | 103 (39) | 110 (43) | 111 (44) | 110 (43) | 105 (41) | 104 (40) | 89 (32) | 80 (27) | 111 (44) |
| Mean maximum °F (°C) | 66.4 (19.1) | 70.4 (21.3) | 80.9 (27.2) | 87.1 (30.6) | 94.1 (34.5) | 102.2 (39.0) | 103.8 (39.9) | 101.5 (38.6) | 97.6 (36.4) | 90.1 (32.3) | 78.4 (25.8) | 68.4 (20.2) | 105.2 (40.7) |
| Mean daily maximum °F (°C) | 43.4 (6.3) | 46.1 (7.8) | 56.5 (13.6) | 64.5 (18.1) | 74.1 (23.4) | 86.2 (30.1) | 91.7 (33.2) | 89.3 (31.8) | 81.5 (27.5) | 67.9 (19.9) | 54.5 (12.5) | 44.5 (6.9) | 66.7 (19.3) |
| Daily mean °F (°C) | 29.4 (−1.4) | 31.8 (−0.1) | 41.4 (5.2) | 49.6 (9.8) | 60.0 (15.6) | 71.6 (22.0) | 77.1 (25.1) | 74.8 (23.8) | 65.9 (18.8) | 51.9 (11.1) | 39.4 (4.1) | 30.4 (−0.9) | 51.9 (11.1) |
| Mean daily minimum °F (°C) | 15.3 (−9.3) | 17.6 (−8.0) | 26.3 (−3.2) | 34.8 (1.6) | 45.9 (7.7) | 57.1 (13.9) | 62.6 (17.0) | 60.3 (15.7) | 50.3 (10.2) | 35.9 (2.2) | 24.4 (−4.2) | 16.2 (−8.8) | 37.2 (2.9) |
| Mean minimum °F (°C) | −4.3 (−20.2) | 0.0 (−17.8) | 8.5 (−13.1) | 21.3 (−5.9) | 31.2 (−0.4) | 44.9 (7.2) | 53.5 (11.9) | 50.2 (10.1) | 36.4 (2.4) | 19.8 (−6.8) | 8.8 (−12.9) | −2.1 (−18.9) | −9.9 (−23.3) |
| Record low °F (°C) | −28 (−33) | −28 (−33) | −20 (−29) | 0 (−18) | 17 (−8) | 33 (1) | 41 (5) | 33 (1) | 18 (−8) | 0 (−18) | −9 (−23) | −31 (−35) | −31 (−35) |
| Average precipitation inches (mm) | 0.38 (9.7) | 0.44 (11) | 0.72 (18) | 1.63 (41) | 2.43 (62) | 2.42 (61) | 2.89 (73) | 2.92 (74) | 1.49 (38) | 1.29 (33) | 0.50 (13) | 0.45 (11) | 17.56 (444.7) |
| Average snowfall inches (cm) | 4.6 (12) | 4.5 (11) | 2.9 (7.4) | 1.7 (4.3) | 0.0 (0.0) | 0.0 (0.0) | 0.0 (0.0) | 0.0 (0.0) | 0.3 (0.76) | 0.9 (2.3) | 2.0 (5.1) | 2.9 (7.4) | 19.8 (50.26) |
| Average precipitation days (≥ 0.01 in) | 2.7 | 3.1 | 3.8 | 6.1 | 7.6 | 7.9 | 8.1 | 6.8 | 4.1 | 4.4 | 3.0 | 2.4 | 60.0 |
| Average snowy days (≥ 0.1 in) | 1.8 | 1.6 | 1.3 | 0.7 | 0.1 | 0.0 | 0.0 | 0.0 | 0.0 | 0.3 | 1.0 | 1.7 | 8.5 |
Source 1: NOAA
Source 2: National Weather Service

== Demographics ==
Historical population
| Census | Pop. | Note | %± |
|---|---|---|---|
| 1910 | 492 | | — |
| 1920 | 733 | | 49.0% |
| 1930 | 944 | | 28.8% |
| 1940 | 1,041 | | 10.3% |
| 1950 | 1,892 | | 81.7% |
| 1960 | 1,594 | | −15.8% |
| 1970 | 1,725 | | 8.2% |
| 1980 | 1,610 | | −6.7% |
| 1990 | 1,495 | | −7.1% |
| 2000 | 1,497 | | 0.1% |
| 2010 | 1,329 | | −11.2% |
| 2020 | 1,263 | | −5.0% |
U.S. Decennial Census

=== 2010 census ===
As of the 2010 census, there were 1,329 people, 650 households and 357 families residing in the city. The population density was 1,527.6 per square mile (589.8/km^{2}). There were 768 housing units at an average density of 882.8 per square mile (340.9/km^{2}). The racial make-up of the city was 98.2% White, 0.1% African American, 0.2% Native American, 1.1% Asian, 0.2% from other races and 0.2% from two or more races. Hispanic or Latino of any race were 3.8% of the population.

There were 650 households, of which 21.1% had children under the age of 18 living with them, 44.8% were married couples living together, 6.6% had a female householder with no husband present, 3.5% had a male householder with no wife present and 45.1% were non-families. 42.5% of all households were made up of individuals and 24.7% had someone living alone who was 65 years of age or older. The average household size was 1.97 and the average family size was 2.67.

The median age was 51.7 years. 18.7% of residents were under the age of 18, 5.1% were between the ages of 18 and 24, 17.8% were from 25 to 44, 26.8% were from 45 to 64 and 31.8% were 65 years of age or older. The sex ratio was 48.9% male and 51.1% female.

=== 2000 census ===
As of the 2000 census, there were 1,497 people, 669 households and 426 families residing in the city. The population density was 1,771.2 per square mile (683.9/km^{2}). There were 766 housing units at an average density of 906.3 per square mile (349.9/km^{2}). The racial make-up of the city was 97.80% White, 0.20% African American, 0.07% Native American, 0.47% Asian, 0.07% Pacific Islander, 0.53% from other races and 0.87% from two or more races. Hispanic or Latino of any race were 2.27% of the population.

There were 669 households, of which 25.3% had children under the age of 18 living with them, 54.7% were married couples living together, 6.7% had a female householder with no husband present and 36.2% were non-families. 34.8% of all households were made up of individuals and 20.8% had someone living alone who was 65 years of age or older. The average household size was 2.16 and the average family size was 2.76.

21.7% of the population were under the age of 18, 6.1% from 18 to 24, 21.9% from 25 to 44, 18.9% from 45 to 64 and 31.4% were 65 years of age or older. The median age was 45 years. For every 100 females, there were 91.2 males. For every 100 females age 18 and over, there were 83.4 males.

The median household income was $30,842 and the median family income was $36,250. Males had a median income of $25,484 and females $19,167. The per capita income was $16,714. About 8.9% of families and 11.8% of the population were below the poverty line, including 18.3% of those under age 18 and 8.4% of those age 65 or over.

== Education ==
The community is served by St. Francis USD 297 public school district.

== Notable people ==
- Ron Evans, astronaut and, as a member of Apollo 17, one of 24 people to have orbited the Moon
- Ray Stafford, Olympian

== See also ==
- Burns, Kansas, was originally named St. Francis
