= Larissa Chouaib =

Lebanese table tennis player (born 1966)

Personal information
- Native name: لاريسا شعيب
- Full name: Larissa Shaib
- Nationality: Ukrainian-Lebanese
- Born: Лариса Гунченко; November 1, 1966 (age 59) Ukraine
- Education: National University of Ukraine on Physical Education and Sport

Sport
- Country: Ukraine Lebanon
- Sport: Table tennis
- Updated on 23 July 2017

Larissa Chouaib (Arabic: لاريسا شعيب; born November 1, 1966) is a Ukrainian-Lebanese Olympic table tennis player and Arab World Table Tennis Champion. She represented Lebanon in 1996 Summer Olympics in Atlanta, where she lost all three of her matches. She studied Sport Education in Kyiv from 1984 to 1989 when she had a Master's degree in the same field. In 2001, she started her coaching career in Table tennis in Lebanon.

== Olympic participation ==
=== Atlanta 1996 ===
Chouaib was the only participant for Lebanon in that tournament.

Table tennis – Women's Singles – Preliminary Round

Group C
Rank	Athlete	W	L	GW	GL	PW	PL	TPE	NZL	ITA	LIB
1	Chen Jing (TPE)	3	0	6	1	145	88	X	2–0	2–1	2–0
2	Chunli Li (NZL)	2	1	4	2	109	76	0–2	X	2–0	2–0
3	Alessia Arisi (ITA)	1	2	3	4	116	120	1–2	0–2	X	2–0
4	Larissa Chouaib (LIB)	0	3	0	6	40	126	0–2	0–2	0–2	X

== Personal life ==
Larissa Chouaib married her college classmate Yahia, and they have a son.
