= Robert Fraisse (fencer) =

French fencer

Personal information
- Born: 12 April 1934
- Died: 22 August 2022 (aged 88)

Sport
- Sport: Fencing
Medal record
Mediterranean Games
Gold medal – first place	1959 Beirut	Team sabre
Bronze medal – third place	1959 Beirut	Individual sabre

Robert Fraisse (12 April 1934 – 22 August 2022) was a French fencer. He competed in the team sabre event at the 1964 Summer Olympics. He also competed at the 1959 Mediterranean Games where he won a gold medal in the team sabre event and a bronze medal in the individual sabre event.
