= Markos Tzoumaras =

Greek sports shooter

Personal information
- Born: 6 November 1939 (age 86) Athens, Greece

Sport
- Sport: Sports shooting

Markos Tzoumaras (born 6 November 1939) is a Greek former sports shooter. He competed in the trap event at the 1968 Summer Olympics.
