= An Jeong-geun =

South Korean sport shooter (born 1924)

Personal information
- Born: 20 November 1924 Keijō, Korea, Empire of Japan

Sport
- Sport: Sports shooting

Korean name
- Hangul: 안정근
- Hanja: 安定根
- RR: An Jeonggeun
- MR: An Chŏnggŭn

An Jeong-geun (Korean: 안정근; born 20 November 1924) is a South Korean former sports shooter. He competed in the trap event at the 1964 Summer Olympics.
