= Joseph Aoun (disambiguation) =

Joseph Aoun (born 1964) is the 14th president of Lebanon and former commander of the Lebanese Armed Forces.

Joseph Aoun may also refer to:

- Joseph Aoun (sport shooter) (born 1933), Lebanese sports shooter
- Joseph E. Aoun (born 1953), Lebanese-born American theoretical syntactician and academic
