= Werner Bühse =

German sports shooter (born 1951)

Personal information
- Born: 27 November 1951 (age 74) Neumünster, West Germany

Sport
- Sport: Sports shooting

Werner Bühse (born 27 November 1951) is a German former sports shooter. He competed in the trap event at the 1968 Summer Olympics for West Germany. Two years later, he won the European Championships.
