= Ray Stafford =

American sports shooter

Personal information
- Born: April 18, 1947 (age 79) St. Francis, Kansas, United States

Sport
- Sport: Sports shooting

Ray Stafford (born April 18, 1947) is an American former sports shooter. He competed in the trap event at the 1968 Summer Olympics. He was part of a team that earned a silver medal at the 1969 World Championships in Spain and was part of the winning team at the 1970 World Championships in Phoenix. He has also served on the ATA Board of Directors since 1983.

== Awards and achievements ==
Ray Stafford was inducted into the Amateur Trapshooting Association’s Hall of Fame in 1988. Throughout his career, he has held 35 state zone titles and 4 ATA zone titles, along with winning 59 Grand American trophies. He has also won 6 Golden West Grand Crowns and 8 Trap & Field All-Around Average Awards. In addition, he secured 4 championships at the Spring Grand and Midwestern Grand and led the ATA singles average 5 times, the handicap average 4 times, and the ATA doubles average once.
