= Fencing at the 1959 Mediterranean Games =

Fencing competition

- Location: Beirut, Lebanon
- Dates: October 1959

The fencing competition at the 1959 Mediterranean Games was held in Beirut, Lebanon.

== Medalists ==
| Event | Gold | Silver | Bronze |
|---|---|---|---|
| Individual épée | Jack Guittet (FRA) | René Queyroux (FRA) | Norbert Brami (TUN) |
| Team épée | France (FRA); Claude Bourquard; Michel Dordé; Jack Guittet; René Queyroux | Lebanon (LBN); Ibrahim Osman; Mohamed Ramadan; Hassan El-Said; Michel Saykali | Spain (ESP); Pedro Cabrera; Jesús Díez; Manuel Martínez; Joaquín Moya |
| Individual foil | Mohamed Gamil El-Kalyoubi (UAR) | Cazaban (FRA) | Guy Barrabino (FRA) |
| Team foil | France (FRA); Guy Barrabino; Cazaban; Michel Dordé; Jack Guittet | United Arab Republic (UAR); Farid El-Ashmawi; Ahmed El-Hamy El-Husseini; Mohamed Gamil El-Kalyoubi; Moustafa Soheim | Lebanon (LBN); Ibrahim Osman; Mohamed Ramadan; Hassan El-Said; Michel Saykali |
| Individual sabre | Jean-Ernest Ramez (FRA) | Jacques Roulot (FRA) | Robert Fraisse (FRA) |
| Team sabre | France (FRA); Guy Barrabino; Robert Fraisse; Jean-Ernest Ramez; Jacques Roulot | Spain (ESP); César de Diego; Enrique González; Ramón Martínez; Pablo Ordejón | United Arab Republic (UAR) |

== Medal table ==
| Rank | Nation | Gold | Silver | Bronze | Total |
|---|---|---|---|---|---|
| 1 | France (FRA) | 5 | 3 | 2 | 10 |
| 2 | United Arab Republic (UAR) | 1 | 1 | 1 | 3 |
| 3 | Lebanon (LBN) | 0 | 1 | 1 | 2 |
| 3 | Spain (ESP) | 0 | 1 | 1 | 2 |
| 5 | Tunisia (TUN) | 0 | 0 | 1 | 1 |
| Totals (5 entries) | | 6 | 6 | 6 | 18 |
