= Lennart Ahlin =

Swedish sports shooter

Personal information
- Born: 26 July 1916 Grästorp, Sweden
- Died: 12 July 1995 (aged 78) Vänersborg, Sweden

Sport
- Sport: Sports shooting

Erik Lennart Ahlin (26 July 1916 – 12 July 1995) was a Swedish sports shooter. He competed in the trap event at the 1964 Summer Olympics.

He won the Swedish Championship in skeet shooting in 1959 and in trap shooting in 1964, 1965, and 1966. He also won the Nordic Championship in 1956.

He lived in Vänersborg, where he managed a driving school.
