= José Passera =

Argentine sports shooter

Personal information
- Born: 21 February 1915
- Died: 23 April 1990 (aged 75)

Sport
- Sport: Sports shooting

José Passera (21 February 1915 – 23 April 1990) was an Argentine sports shooter. He competed in the trap event during the 1964 Summer Olympics.
