= Ana María Barrenechea =

Argentinian writer

- Born: 6 March 1913; Buenos Aires
- Died: 4 October 2010 (aged 97); Buenos Aires
- Occupations: Writer, linguist, critic

Ana María Barrenechea (6 March 1913 – 4 October 2010) was an Argentine writer, linguist, and literary critic.

== Biography ==
Barrenechea completed her studies in philology at the Higher Institute of Teachers of Buenos Aires, being taught by Amado Alonso and Pedro Henríquez Ureña, both of whom pushed Barrenechea towards research and literary criticism. In 1953, she was awarded the Guggenheim Fellowship (which she would receive again in 1968 to study linguistics) by El Colegio de México to study abroad in the United States at the Bryn Mawr College, where she completed her doctorate three years later. She returned to Buenos Aires and began to study Spanish grammar in Argentina and abroad in Mexico, Puerto Rico, and the United States, at one point teaching at Harvard University. From 1958 to 1966, Barrenechea taught at the University of Buenos Aires, was a member of the Coordinated Study Project of the Language of the Primary Iberian Cities and Peninsula (PILEI), and CONICET's Advisory Commission on Philology between 1964 and 1966 and 1984 to 1987.
