= Kurt Czekalla =

German sport shooter (1930–2002)

Personal information
- Born: 30 September 1930 Schönebeck, Germany
- Died: 19 March 2002 (aged 71)

Sport
- Sport: Sports shooting
Medal record
Men's shooting
Representing East Germany
Olympic Games
Bronze medal – third place	1968 Mexico City	Trap

Kurt Czekalla (30 September 1930 – 19 March 2002) was a German sport shooter who competed in the 1968 Summer Olympics winning a bronze medal in the trap event.
