= Osama Al-Aoun =

Qatari footballer (born 1986)

Osama Al-Aoun أسامه العون
Personal information
- Full name: Osama Musa Sanad Al-Aoun
- Date of birth: 8 December 1986 (age 39)
- Place of birth: Qatar
- Height: 1.73 m (5 ft 8 in)
- Position: Midfielder

Senior career*
Years	Team	Apps	(Gls)
2008–2009	Al-Kharaitiyat		
2009–2012	El Jaish		
2012–2013	Al-Khor		
2013–2015	Al-Shamal		
2015–2018	Mesaimeer		
2018–2019	Al-Markhiya		
2019–2020	Mesaimeer		
2020	Muaither		
2020–2022	Al Bidda		
- * Club domestic league appearances and goals

Osama Musa Al-Aoun (Arabic:أسامه موسى العون ; born 8 December 1986) is a Qatari footballer. He currently plays as a midfielder.

== Career ==
He formerly played for Al-Kharaitiyat, El Jaish, Al-Khor, Al-Shamal, Mesaimeer, Al-Markhiya, Muaither, and Al Bidda.
