= Cvetka Ahlin =

Slovenian opera singer and mezzo-sopranist

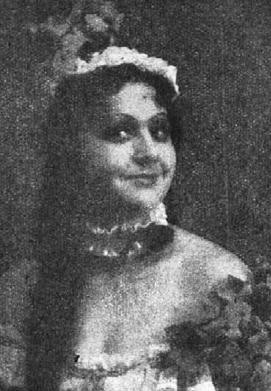
Cvetka Ahlin

Cvetka Ahlin (28 November 1927, in Cologne – 30 July 1985, in Hamburg) was a Slovenian opera singer and mezzo-sopranist. Since 1951, she was the main singer of the Ljubljana Opera. From 1956 she was a singer in the Hamburg national opera, where a.o. she sang second lady to the Queen of the Night in The Magic Flute under Karl Böhm (recorded by Deutsche Grammophon). She sang in the works of Jules Massenet and Richard Strauss. In 1967, she sang as a contralto in Smetana's Battered Bride with the German Opera Orchestra Berlin conducted by Heinrich Hollreiser.

== Notable roles ==
- Charlotte in the opera Werther by Jules Massenet
- Octavian in the opera Der Rosenkavalier by Richard Strauss
