= Thomas Garrigus =

American sport shooter

- Born: November 9, 1946; Hillsboro, Oregon
- Died: December 29, 2006 (aged 60); Plains, Montana
- Education: Hillsboro High School
- Known for: 1968 Olympic Silver Medal
- Children: Robert Garrigus

Thomas Irvin Garrigus (November 9, 1946 – December 29, 2006) was an American Olympic athlete who competed in shooting sports. A native of Oregon, he competed at the 1968 Summer Games where he won a silver medal, and later served as a coach.

== Early life ==
Garrigus was born in Hillsboro, Oregon, to Donald and Wanda (née Williams) Garrigus. He was raised in Hillsboro, a western suburb of Portland, and began skeet shooting at the age of three. There he graduated from Hillsboro High School before joining the United States Air Force, serving from 1965 to 1969.

== Olympics ==
Olympic medal record

Men's shooting

Representing United States
Silver medal – second place	1968 Mexico City	Trap

In 1968, Garrigus won a spot on the United States Olympic Team to compete at the Summer Games held in Mexico City, and was still a member of the U.S. Air Force Shooting Team. He was the youngest member of the U.S. shooting team at the Games. Competing in shooting for Men's Trap, he won the silver medal for this shotgun event. Garrigus tied for second place in the event, with John Braithwaite of the United Kingdom winning the gold medal with a world record score of 198.

Held on October 19, the event had a three-way tie for second place between Garrigus, Kurt Czekalla of East Germany, and Pavel Senichev of the Soviet Union all with a score of 196. In the first shoot-off between the three competitors, Czekalla and Garrigus had scores of 25 in this event where clay pigeons are shot, while Senichev was eliminated with a score of 22. Garrigus then defeated the East German in the second shoot-off with a score of 25 to 23. This was the highest finish for an American in the event since Mark Arie won the gold medal in 1920.

== Later life and family ==
After leaving the Air Force, Garrigus returned to Oregon and enrolled at Western Business College (now Everest College) and went on to work primarily as a salesperson. He also served as a coach with the U.S. Shooting Team from 1992 to 2002. Garrigus lived in Oregon, where he served as the director for the Hillsboro Trap & Skeet Club before moving to Idaho where he was the director of the Boise Gun Club. In 1993 he married his wife Jackie, and they moved to Montana in 2006 to retire. From two previous marriages, he had two sons, Thomas Bradley and Robert. Son Robert Garrigus is a professional golfer. In 1996, he worked as a referee for the shooting events at the Summer Games in Atlanta and was a torch bearer on the route through Salem, Oregon. Garrigus died in Plains, Montana, at the age of 60.
