= Percy Sayegh =

Lebanese swimmer (born 1965)

Personal information
- Born: March 27, 1965 (age 61)

Sport
- Sport: Swimming

Percy Sayegh (born 27 March 1965) is a former Lebanese swimmer who competed in the 1984 Summer Olympics.
