= Arturo Porro (sport shooter) =

Uruguayan sport shooter

Personal information
- Full name: Arturo I. Porro Canavero
- Born: 13 November 1919 Montevideo, Uruguay
- Died: 28 November 1990 (aged 71)

Sport
- Sport: Sports shooting

Arturo I. Porro Canavero (13 November 1919 – 28 November 1990) was a Uruguayan sports shooter. He competed in the trap event at the 1968 Summer Olympics.
