= Ziad Richa =

Lebanese sport shooter (born 1967)

Personal information
- Nationality: Lebanese
- Born: September 25, 1967 (age 57)
- Height: 1.83 m (6 ft 0 in)
- Weight: 82 kg (181 lb)

Sport
- Country: Lebanon
- Sport: Shooting
- Event: Skeet
- Club: Dbaye Shooting Club

Ziad Richa (born September 25, 1967) is a Lebanese skeet shooter who has represented his nation at the 2008 Summer Olympics in Beijing, where he finished twenty-ninth out of forty-one shooters in the men's skeet event. Richa was also the flag bearer at the opening ceremony.

Richa served as the secretary general of the Lebanese Shooting Association.
