= Fotios Isaakidis =

Greek sports shooter

Personal information
- Born: 29 May 1908

Sport
- Sport: Sports shooting

Fotios Isaakidis (born 29 May 1908, date of death unknown) was a Greek sports shooter. He competed in the trap event at the 1964 Summer Olympics.
