= Juan Ángel Martini Sr. =

Argentine sports shooter

Personal information
- Born: 28 December 1915 Buenos Aires, Argentina
- Died: 30 January 2005 (aged 89)

Sport
- Sport: Sports shooting

Juan Ángel Martini Sr. (28 December 1915 – 30 January 2005) was an Argentine sports shooter. He competed at the 1960 Summer Olympics and the 1964 Summer Olympics. His son also competed at the Olympics as a sports shooter.
