= Mehmet Dursun =

Turkish sports shooter

Personal information
- Born: 16 July 1928 Diyarbakır, Turkey

Sport
- Sport: Sports shooting

Mehmet Dursun (born 16 July 1928) is a Turkish former sports shooter. He competed at the 1968, 1972 and 1976 Summer Olympics.
