= Mohamed Ramadan (fencer) =

Lebanese fencer (born 1931)

Personal information
- Born: 6 July 1931 Marjayoun, Lebanon

Sport
- Sport: Fencing
Medal record
Mediterranean Games
Silver medal – second place	1959 Beirut	Team épée
Bronze medal – third place	1959 Beirut	Team foil

Mohamed Ramadan (born 6 July 1931) is a Lebanese fencer. He competed in the individual and team épée events at the 1960 Summer Olympics. He also competed at the 1959 Mediterranean Games where he won a silver medal in the team épée event and team foil event.
