= Pedro Estay =

Chilean sports shooter

Personal information
- Born: 29 May 1929 Santiago, Chile
- Died: 17 September 2011 (aged 82) Scottsdale, Arizona, United States

Sport
- Sport: Sports shooting

Pedro Estay (29 May 1929 – 17 September 2011) was a Chilean sports shooter. He competed in the trap event at the 1968 Summer Olympics.
