= Bob Braithwaite =

British sport shooter (1925–2015)

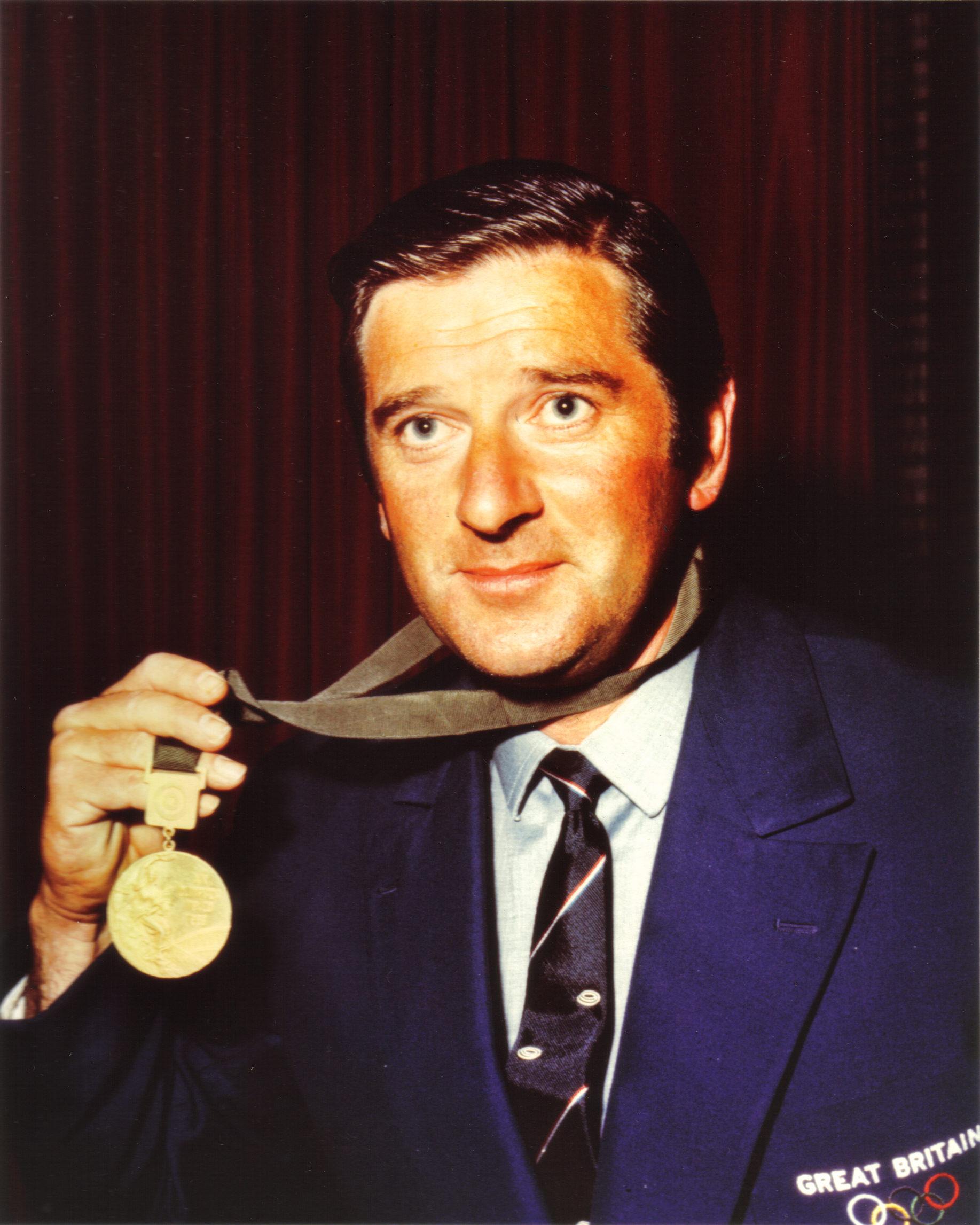
- Bob Braithwaite MBE

Personal information
- Born: 28 September 1925 Arnside, Cumbria, England
- Died: 26 February 2015 (aged 89)

Sport
- Sport: Sports shooting
Medal record
Men's shooting
Representing United Kingdom
Olympic Games
Gold medal – first place	1968 Mexico City	Trap

John Robert (Bob) Braithwaite MBE (28 September 1925 – 26 February 2015) was a British trap shooter who represented his country at the 1964 Summer Olympics and the 1968 Summer Olympics, winning a gold medal at the latter.

== Biography ==
Born at Arnside, Cumbria, and educated at the Friends School Lancaster and the University of Edinburgh, Braithwaite qualified as a Veterinary Surgeon in 1947.

Already a notable game shot, in 1956 he began competing in trap shooting events and within a short time he had become one of the country's leading target shooters. In 1964 he gained a place in the British Shooting Team for the Tokyo Olympic Games where he was placed 7th in the Trap Event.

Qualifying again for the 1968 Games in Mexico City his busy veterinary practice provided him with little time to travel to the few training grounds available. Instead he installed a powerful oscillating trap on a piece of ground known as Rough Lot, adjacent to the Braithwaites' old family farm. With the help of the local priest, who volunteered to operate the trap, Braithwaite would shoot 50 targets twice a week.

At the Mexico Games the trap event consisted of 200 targets in eight stages shot over two days. In the first stage Braithwaite missed two targets. He then proceeded to break every one of the subsequent 175 targets equalling the Olympic record and earning for himself the gold medal. He shot alongside fellow GB and friend, Eric Grantham from East Yorkshire.

Though he won many other events during his career, it is for his Olympic victory that he is best remembered. Braithwaite's achievement represents one of the last occasions in the history of the Olympic Games in which an amateur won over a field consisting predominantly of commercially sponsored and government-funded professionals.

== Olympic results ==
Event	1968	1964
Trap (men)	(gold) gold198x200	7th
