= Miguel Barrenechea =

Mexican sports shooter

Personal information
- Born: 17 October 1947 (age 78) Matamoros, Mexico

Sport
- Sport: Sports shooting

Miguel Barrenechea (born 17 October 1947) is a Mexican former sports shooter. He competed in the trap event at the 1968 Summer Olympics.
