= Alessia Arisi =

Italian table tennis player (born 1971)

Personal information
- Nationality: Italian
- Born: 10 December 1971 (age 53) Parma, Italy

Sport
- Sport: Table tennis

Alessia Arisi (born 10 December 1971) is an Italian table tennis player. She competed at the 1992 Summer Olympics and the 1996 Summer Olympics.
