= Guy Rénard =

Belgian sports shooter

Personal information
- Born: 16 March 1934 (age 92) Châtelet, Belgium

Sport
- Sport: Sports shooting

Guy Rénard (born 16 March 1934) is a Belgian former sports shooter. He competed at the 1968 Summer Olympics and the 1972 Summer Olympics.
