= Metin Salihoğlu =

Turkish sports shooter (born 1928)

Personal information
- Born: 1928 Istanbul, Turkey

Sport
- Sport: Sports shooting

Metin Salihoğlu (born 1928) is a Turkish former sports shooter. He competed in the trap event at the 1968 Summer Olympics.
