= Yves Daniel Darricau =

Lebanese fencer

Personal information
- Born: 2 August 1953 (age 72)

Sport
- Sport: Fencing

Yves Daniel Darricau (Arabic: إيف دانيال داريكو; born 2 August 1953) is a Lebanese épée, foil and sabre fencer. He competed at the 1972 and 1984 Summer Olympics.
