= Laszlo Szapáry =

Austrian sports shooter

Personal information
- Born: 12 July 1910 Altmünster, Austria-Hungary
- Died: 22 July 1998 (aged 88) Dobersberg, Austria

Sport
- Sport: Sports shooting

Laszlo Szapáry (12 July 1910 – 22 July 1998) was an Austrian sports shooter. He competed at the 1952 Summer Olympics, 1960 Summer Olympics and 1964 Summer Olympics.
