= Mohamed Mehrez =

Egyptian sports shooter

Personal information
- Born: 17 July 1935 Cairo, Egypt
- Died: 17 June 2008 (aged 72)

Sport
- Sport: Sports shooting

Mohamed Mehrez (17 July 1935 – 17 June 2008) was an Egyptian sports shooter. He competed at the 1964 Summer Olympics and the 1968 Summer Olympics.
