= Joseph Aoun (sport shooter) =

Lebanese sports shooter (born 1933)

Personal information
- Born: 18 November 1933 (age 92)

Sport
- Sport: Sports shooting

Joseph Aoun (born 18 November 1933) is a Lebanese former sports shooter. He competed in the trap event at the 1964 Summer Olympics.
