= Tarek Abou Al Dahab =

Lebanese cyclist (born 1939)

Personal information
- Born: 25 December 1939 (age 86) Beirut, Lebanon
- Height: 1.7 m (5 ft 7 in)
- Weight: 64 kg (141 lb)

Cycling career
- Sport: Cycling
- Disciplines: Road; Track
- Role: Rider

Tarek Abou Al Dahab (born 25 December 1939) is a Lebanese former cyclist. He competed at the 1968 Summer Olympics and the 1972 Summer Olympics.

Al Dahab took an interest in cycling from a young age. He participated in his first races in approximately 1956. In 1959, he finished sixth in the road race at the Mediterranean Games behind five Spaniards. After this performance, he was noticed by cyclists from the French team, who urged him to come and race in France. He raced for several seasons as an amateur in Paris while holding a job at a post office. He won the Prix de Clermont-Ferrand in 1961, and a race held in Évreux in 1963. He also finished 34th in the UCI amateur world road race championships in 1962, and eighth in a stage of the Peace Race in 1964. At the end of 1965, he returned to Lebanon, where he opened his own bicycle shop and was crowned national champion five times on both the road and track. He then took part in the 1968 and 1972 Olympic Games, where he competed on the road and track.
