= Michel Saykali =

Lebanese fencer (1932–2015)

Personal information
- Born: 12 June 1932 Sidon, Lebanon
- Died: 7 May 2015 (aged 82)

Sport
- Sport: Fencing
Medal record
Mediterranean Games
Silver medal – second place	1959 Beirut	Team épée
Bronze medal – third place	1959 Beirut	Team foil

Michel Saykali (12 June 1932 – 7 May 2015) was a Lebanese fencer. He competed in the individual and team épée events at the 1960 and 1964 Summer Olympics. He also competed at the 1959 Mediterranean Games where he won a silver medal in the team épée event and team foil event.
