= Hassan El-Said =

Lebanese fencer (born 1924)

Personal information
- Born: 1 January 1924 Tripoli, Lebanon

Sport
- Sport: Fencing
Medal record
Mediterranean Games
Silver medal – second place	1959 Beirut	Team épée
Bronze medal – third place	1959 Beirut	Team foil

Hassan El-Said (born 1 January 1924) is a Lebanese fencer. He competed at the 1960 and 1964 Summer Olympics. He also competed at the 1959 Mediterranean Games where he won a silver medal in the team épée event and team foil event.
