= Rami Kantari =

Lebanese swimmer (born 1963)

Personal information
- Born: 8 February 1963 (age 63)

Sport
- Sport: Swimming

Rami Kantari (born 8 February 1963) is a Lebanese swimmer. He competed at the 1984 Summer Olympics and the 1988 Summer Olympics.
