= Ibrahim Osman (fencer) =

Lebanese fencer (born 1927)

Personal information
- Born: 2 March 1927 Akkar District, Lebanon

Sport
- Sport: Fencing
Medal record
Mediterranean Games
Silver medal – second place	1959 Beirut	Team épée
Bronze medal – third place	1959 Beirut	Team foil

Ibrahim Osman (born 2 March 1927) is a Lebanese fencer. He competed at the 1960 and 1964 Summer Olympics. He also competed at the 1959 Mediterranean Games where he won a silver medal in the team épée event and team foil event.
