= Lin Ho-ming =

Taiwanese sports shooter

Personal information
- Born: 林 鶴鳴, Pinyin: Lín Hè-míng; 27 June 1928 Pingtung, Taiwan

Sport
- Sport: Sports shooting

Lin Ho-ming (born 27 June 1928) is a Taiwanese former sports shooter. He competed at the 1964 Summer Olympics and the 1968 Summer Olympics.
