= Khodor Alaywan =

Lebanese weightlifter (born 1973)

Personal information
- Full name: Khodor Munir Alaywan
- Born: 17 September 1973 (age 52)
- Height: 165 cm (5 ft 5 in)
- Weight: 76.44 kg (168.5 lb)

Sport
- Country: Lebanon
- Sport: Weightlifting
- Weight class: 77 kg
- Team: National team
- Updated on 2 October 2016

Khodor Munir Alaywan (خضر منير عليوان, born 17 September 1973) is a Lebanese male weightlifter, competing in the 77 kg category and representing Lebanon at international competitions. He participated at the 1988 Summer Olympics in the 52 kg event and twelve years later at the 2000 Summer Olympics in the 85 kg event. He competed at world championships, most recently at the 1999 World Weightlifting Championships.

== Major results ==
Year	Venue	Weight	Snatch (kg)				Clean & Jerk (kg)				Total	Rank
Year	Venue	Weight	1	2	3	Rank	1	2	3	Rank	Total	Rank
Summer Olympics
2000	Sydney, Australia	85 kg				—N/a				—N/a		19
1988	Seoul, South Korea	52 kg				—N/a				—N/a		21
World Championships
1999	Piraeus, Greece	77 kg	~~125~~	~~125~~	125	51	150	~~155~~	~~155~~	51	275	51
