= Roland Dagher =

Lebanese sprinter

Personal information
- Nationality: Lebanese

Sport
- Sport: Sprinting
- Event: 100 metres

Roland Dagher is a Lebanese sprinter. He competed in the men's 100 metres at the 1980 Summer Olympics, and was eliminated in Round 1.

Dagher had an accomplished domestic sprinting career before the 1980 Olympics, returning to competition at the 1979 Mini Athletics Tournament.
