= Dany Haddad =

Lebanese fencer

Personal information
- Born: 16 September 1960 (age 66)

Sport
- Sport: Fencing

Dany Haddad (born 16 September 1960) is a Lebanese épée and foil fencer. He competed at the 1980 and 1984 Summer Olympics.
