= Josef Meixner (sport shooter) =

Austrian sports shooter

Personal information
- Born: 7 December 1939 (age 86) Bratislava, Slovakia

Sport
- Sport: Sports shooting

Josef Meixner (born 7 December 1939) is an Austrian former sports shooter. He competed at four Olympic Games.
