= Juan Enrique Lira =

Chilean sports shooter

Personal information
- Born: 27 October 1927 Santiago, Chile
- Died: 12 March 2007 (aged 79)

Sport
- Sport: Sports shooting

Juan Enrique Lira (27 October 1927 – 12 March 2007) was a Chilean sports shooter. He competed at the 1960, 1964 and 1968 Summer Olympics.

Lira later became a photo editor for the Santiago newspaper El Mercurio and was working allowed into the Chilean presidential palace, "La Moneda" after the coup d'état of September 11, 1973 overthrew President Salvador Allende. Lira was the first to tell reporters after the coup that Allende and the presidential press secretary had shot themselves to death as Chilean troops were preparing to storm the building.
