= Georgios Pangalos =

Greek sports shooter

Personal information
- Born: 21 June 1936 (age 90) Alexandria, Egypt

Sport
- Sport: Sports shooting

Georgios Pangalos (born 21 June 1936) is a Greek former sports shooter. He competed at the 1960, 1964 and 1968 Summer Olympics.
