= Michel Youssef =

Lebanese fencer

Personal information
- Full name: Michel Hassib Youssef
- Nationality: Lebanese
- Born: 23 June 1960 (age 66)

Sport
- Country: Lebanon
- Sport: Fencing

Michel Youssef (born 23 June 1960) is a Lebanese épée and foil fencer. He competed at the 1984, 1988 and 1992 Summer Olympics.
