= Elias Salhab =

Lebanese sports shooter

Personal information
- Born: 18 March 1925 Zouk Mikael, Lebanon

Sport
- Sport: Sports shooting

Elias Salhab (born 18 March 1925) is a Lebanese former sports shooter. He competed at the 1960, 1968 and the 1972 Summer Olympics.
