= List of flag bearers for Lebanon at the Olympics =

Lebanon at the Olympics
- IOC code: LBN
- NOC: Lebanese Olympic Committee
- Website: www.lebolymp.org
- Medals: Gold 0 Silver 2 Bronze 2 Total 4

Summer appearances
- 1948; 1952; 1956; 1960; 1964; 1968; 1972; 1976; 1980; 1984; 1988; 1992; 1996; 2000; 2004; 2008; 2012; 2016; 2020; 2024

Winter appearances
- 1948; 1952; 1956; 1960; 1964; 1968; 1972; 1976; 1980; 1984; 1988; 1992; 1994–1998; 2002; 2006; 2010; 2014; 2018; 2022; 2026

This is a list of flag bearers who have represented Lebanon at the Olympics.

Flag bearers carry the national flag of their country at the opening ceremony of the Olympic Games.

#	Event year	Season	Flag bearer	Sport
1	1980	Winter	Edward Samen	Alpine skiing
2	1984	Summer	Toni Khouri	Official
3	1988	Winter	Michel Samen	Official
4	1996	Summer	Mohamed Al-Aywan	Weightlifting
5	2000	Summer	Jean-Claude Rabbath	Athletics
6	2002	Winter	Chirine Njeim	Alpine skiing
7	2004	Summer	Jean-Claude Rabbath	Athletics
8	2006	Winter	Edmond Keyrouz	Alpine skiing (did not compete)
9	2008	Summer	Ziad Richa	Shooting
10	2010	Winter	Chirine Njeim	Alpine skiing
11	2012	Summer	Andrea Paoli	Taekwondo
12	2014	Winter	Alexandre Mohbat	Alpine skiing
13	2016	Summer	Nacif Elias	Judo
14	2018	Winter	Samer Tawk	Cross-country skiing
15	2020	Summer	Ray Bassil	Shooting
15	2020	Summer	Nacif Elias	Judo
16	2022	Winter	Cesar Arnouk	Alpine skiing
16	2022	Winter	Manon Ouaiss	Alpine skiing
17	2024	Summer	Simon Doueihy	Swimming
17	2024	Summer	Laetitia Aoun	Taekwondo

== See also ==
- Lebanon at the Olympics
