= Lebanon at the 1992 Winter Olympics =

- IOC code: LIB
- NOC: Lebanese Olympic Committee
- Website: www.lebolymp.org

in Albertville
- Competitors: 4 (men) in 1 sport
- Medals: Gold 0 Silver 0 Bronze 0 Total 0

Winter Olympics appearances (overview)
- 1948; 1952; 1956; 1960; 1964; 1968; 1972; 1976; 1980; 1984; 1988; 1992; 1994–1998; 2002; 2006; 2010; 2014; 2018; 2022; 2026

Lebanon had four competitors at the 1992 Winter Olympics in Albertville, France, all of whom took part in the men's slalom skiing events. The 1992 Winter Games was the first in which Lebanon competed under the newly standardised flag design that was adopted in 1990.

In the Super-G, Elias Majdalani finished 58th. In the giant slalom, Majdalani finished 57th and Dany Abounaoum 88th, while Raymond Kayrouz and Jean Khalil both missed gates and were disqualified. In the Slalom, Khalil finished 53rd and Abounaoum 62nd, while Majdalani failed to start and Kayrouz failed to finish his first run.

== Competitors ==
The following is the list of number of competitors in the Games.

| Sport | Men | Women | Total |
|---|---|---|---|
| Alpine skiing | 4 | 0 | 4 |
| Total | 4 | 0 | 4 |

== Alpine skiing ==
Men

| Athlete | Event | Race 1 | Race 2 | Total | |
| Athlete | Event | Time | Time | Time | Rank |
|---|---|---|---|---|---|
| Elias Majdalani | Super-G | | | 1:22.13 | 58 |
| Raymond Keyrouz | Giant slalom | DSQ | – | DSQ | – |
| Dany Abounaoum | Giant slalom | 1:37.40 | 1:46.99 | 3:24.39 | 88 |
| Jean Khalil | Giant slalom | 1:28.07 | DSQ | DSQ | – |
| Elias Majdalani | Giant slalom | 1:18.32 | 1:17.45 | 2:35.77 | 57 |
| Raymond Keyrouz | Slalom | DNF | – | DNF | – |
| Dany Abounaoum | Slalom | 1:31.08 | 1:32.68 | 3:03.76 | 62 |
| Jean Khalil | Slalom | 1:17.07 | 1:16.06 | 2:33.13 | 53 |
