= Lebanon at the 1988 Winter Olympics =

- IOC code: LIB
- NOC: Lebanese Olympic Committee
- Website: www.lebolymp.org

in Calgary
- Competitors: 4 (men) in 1 sport
- Flag bearer: Michel Samen
- Medals: Gold 0 Silver 0 Bronze 0 Total 0

Winter Olympics appearances (overview)
- 1948; 1952; 1956; 1960; 1964; 1968; 1972; 1976; 1980; 1984; 1988; 1992; 1994–1998; 2002; 2006; 2010; 2014; 2018; 2022; 2026; 2030

Lebanon competed at the 1988 Winter Olympics in Calgary, Alberta, Canada.

== Competitors ==
The following is the list of number of competitors in the Games.

| Sport | Men | Women | Total |
|---|---|---|---|
| Alpine skiing | 4 | 0 | 4 |
| Total | 4 | 0 | 4 |

== Alpine skiing ==
Men

| Athlete | Event | Race 1 | Race 2 | Total | |
| Athlete | Event | Time | Time | Time | Rank |
|---|---|---|---|---|---|
| Elias Majdalani | Super-G | | | 1:47.58 | 32 |
| Toni Salame | Giant Slalom | DSQ | – | DSQ | – |
| Pierre Succar | Giant Slalom | DSQ | – | DSQ | – |
| Karim Sabbagh | Giant Slalom | DSQ | – | DSQ | – |
| Elias Majdalani | Giant Slalom | 1:10.95 | 1:08.63 | 2:19.58 | 38 |
| Pierre Succar | Slalom | DSQ | – | DSQ | – |
| Elias Majdalani | Slalom | DNF | – | DNF | – |
| Karim Sabbagh | Slalom | 1:16.52 | 1:10.15 | 2:26.67 | 40 |
| Toni Salame | Slalom | 1:12.74 | 1:04.23 | 2:16.97 | 34 |
