= Lebanon at the 1980 Winter Olympics =

- IOC code: LIB
- NOC: Lebanese Olympic Committee
- Website: www.lebolymp.org

in Lake Placid
- Competitors: 3 (2 men, 1 woman) in 1 sport
- Flag bearer: Edward Samen
- Medals: Gold 0 Silver 0 Bronze 0 Total 0

Winter Olympics appearances (overview)
- 1948; 1952; 1956; 1960; 1964; 1968; 1972; 1976; 1980; 1984; 1988; 1992; 1994–1998; 2002; 2006; 2010; 2014; 2018; 2022; 2026

Lebanon competed at the 1980 Winter Olympics in Lake Placid, United States.

== Alpine skiing ==
Men

Athlete	Event	Race 1		Race 2		Total	
Athlete	Event	Time	Rank	Time	Rank	Time	Rank
Sami Rebez	Giant Slalom	DNF	–	–	–	DNF	–
Habib Khoury	Giant Slalom	DNF	-	-	-	DNF	-
Naji Heneine	Giant Slalom	1:35.59	56	2:01.88	54	3:37.47	53
Sami Rebez	Slalom	DNF	-	DNF	–	DNF	–
Habib Khoury	Slalom	DNF	-	DNF	-	DNF	-
Naji Heneine	Slalom	1:07.87	38	1:18.52	35	2:26.39	35

Women

Athlete	Event	Race 1		Race 2		Total	
Athlete	Event	Time	Rank	Time	Rank	Time	Rank
Farida Rahmed	Downhill					2:42.88	27
Farida Rahmed	Giant Slalom	1:40.50	41	1:58.99	34	3:39.49	34
Farida Rahmed	Slalom	1:22.470	25	1:06.01	19	2:28.48	19
