= Keyrouz =

Keyrouz, also written as Kayrouz, is a Levantine Arabic surname. According to the historian Issam Farid Karam, the Keyrouz family traces its roots to the village of Ayn Halya in modern-day Syria.

Notable people with the surname include:

- Elie Keyrouz (born 1958), Lebanese politician
- Ghassan Keyrouz (born 1951), Lebanese alpine skier
- Jean Keyrouz (born 1931), Lebanese alpine skier
- Marie Keyrouz (born 1963), Lebanese nun and chanter of Oriental Church music
- Rabih Kayrouz (born 1973), Lebanese fashion designer
- Raymond Kayrouz (born 1970), Lebanese alpine skier
- Naji Keyrouz (1960–2019), Lebanese judoka
- Danny Thomas (born Amos Muzyad Yakhoob Kairouz; 1912–1991), American entertainer
