= Salama =

Salama or Salamah may refer to:

== People ==
=== Given name ===
- Umm Salama (circa 596–680), wife of Muhammad
- Salama Abu Hashim, one of the companions of Muhammad
- Umm Salama bint Ya'qub al-Makhzumi, Arab nobility and principal wife of Arab caliph al-Saffah (r. 750–754).
- Salamah ibn al-Akwa (died c. 757 or 781), one of the companions of Muhammad
- Salamah ibn Dinar al-Madani (died c. 757 or 781), Persian Muslim ascetic, jurist and narrator of hadith
- Salama bint Said, later Emily Ruete (1844–1924), daughter of Sultan Sayyid Said of Zanzibar and Oman
- Salama Moussa (1887–1958), notable Egyptian journalist and reformer
- Salama al-Khufaji, member of the Interim Iraq Governing Council (2003–2004)

==== Royalty ====
- Aba Salama or Frumentius (died c. 360), bishop of Aksum
- Salama II (Aksum) or Minas of Aksum (6th century), bishop of Aksum
- Sallamah Umm Abdallah (714–775), mother of Abbasīd caliph al-Mansur
- Abuna Salama II (r. 1348–1388)
- Abuna Salama III (r. 1841–1867)
- Salama bint Hamdan Al Nahyan, Emirati royal

=== Surname ===
- Amine Salama (born 2000), French footballer
- Fathy Salama (born 1969), Egyptian musician
- Hasan Salama (1913–1948), commander of the Palestinian Holy War Army
- Hannu Salama (born 1936), Finnish author
- Kareem Salama (fl. 2006–pres.), American country singer of Egyptian descent
- Mohamed Salamah (1899–1982), Egyptian Quran reciter
- Mohamed Yousri Salama (1974–2013), Egyptian politician
- Peter Salama (1968–2020), Australian epidemiologist

== Places ==
- Salama, Jaffa, a depopulated Palestinian Arab village
- Salamah, Saudi Arabia
- Salamah, Syria
- Salamá, Guatemala
- Salamá, Olancho, Honduras
- Sallama, Israel
- Dayr Abu Salama, a depopulated Palestinian village
- Dor Salamah (Sabah), Yemen

== Transportation ==
- Al Salamah, a motor yacht
- Fulk al Salamah (ship), Omani transport ship
- Fulk Al Salamah (2016 yacht)
- SS Salama, a Finnish 1874 steam schooner, now museum ship

== Other uses ==
- Salama (company), common name for Islamic Arab Insurance Company, in Dubai
- Salama (roller coaster), at Linnanmäki Park, Finland
- Salama, a character in Amagi Brilliant Park
- Salamah College, in Chester Hill, New South Wales, Australia

== See also ==
- Salameh (disambiguation)
- Salami (disambiguation)
- Salamé, a surname
- Banu Salama, a family that governed the regions of Huesca and Barbitanya (Barbastro) in the Upper March of Al-Andalus c. 780-800
