= Salami (disambiguation) =

Salami is cured sausage, fermented and air-dried meat, originating from one of a variety of animals.

Salami may also refer to:

== Places ==
- Salami, Iran, a city in Razavi Khorasan Province, Iran
- Salami, Ramhormoz, a village in Khuzestan Province, Iran
- Salami, Shadegan, a village in Khuzestan Province, Iran
- Salami District, Razavi Khorasan Province, Iran
- Salami Rural District (Khuzestan Province), Iran
- Salami Rural District (Razavi Khorasan Province), Iran
- Salami Plantation, see Admiralty Islands campaign

== People ==
- Salami (surname)

== Other uses ==
- Another name for eidiyah, a gift, usually money, given to children on Eid al-Fitr and Eid al-Adha
- Slang for a grand slam homer in baseball

== See also ==
- Salaami, 1994 Indian film
- Salama (disambiguation)
- Salameh (disambiguation)
- Salamé disambiguation)
- Salamis (disambiguation)
- Salumi
