= Lebanon at the 1956 Winter Olympics =

- IOC code: LIB
- NOC: Lebanese Olympic Committee
- Website: www.lebolymp.org

in Cortina d'Ampezzo, Italy
- Competitors: 3 (men) in 2 sports
- Medals: Gold 0 Silver 0 Bronze 0 Total 0

Winter Olympics appearances (overview)
- 1948; 1952; 1956; 1960; 1964; 1968; 1972; 1976; 1980; 1984; 1988; 1992; 1994–1998; 2002; 2006; 2010; 2014; 2018; 2022; 2026

Lebanon competed at the 1956 Winter Olympics in Cortina d'Ampezzo, Italy, which was held from 26 January to 5 February 1956. This marked Lebanon's third appearance in a Winter Olympic Games. The nation sent three male skiers, competing in four events. Skier Ibrahim Geagea participated in his third consecutive Winter Games, with his best finish being 42nd in the men's downhill event. Jean Keyrouz's 43rd in the same event marked his best result in the Games. Georges Gereidi's best result was 86th in the men's giant slalom event. Although he was disqualified, Gereidi's participation in the 15 kilometre cross-country skiing race marked the first time that Lebanon competed in a discipline besides alpine skiing.

== Background ==
The Lebanese Olympic Committee was founded in 1946 and officially recognised by the International Olympic Committee on 22 November 1947. A few months later, the nation made its debut in the 1948 Winter Olympics in St. Moritz, Switzerland. As such, their appearance in 1956 marked their third Winter Games appearance. The 1956 Games were held in Cortina d'Ampezzo, Italy, from 26 January to 5 February and hosted 821 athletes in 24 events from 32 different nations.

Lebanon sent a total delegation of nine people: chef de mission Mansour Geagea, officials Louis Baz, Raoul Maghrabi, and Robert Nassif, and assistants Faas Chaleb and Michel Samen, along with the three skiers: Ibrahim Geagea, Georges Gereidi, and Jean Keyrouz, who competed in four different skiing events in alpine skiing and cross-country skiing. They were lodged at the Albergo Cortina for the duration of the Games.

== Alpine skiing ==
Lebanon sent three alpine skiers and competed in three alpine skiing events. In the men's downhill event, the country was represented by Jean Keyrouz, a leading figure in the early history of skiing in Lebanon and a founder of the Lebanese Ski Federation, and Ibrahim Geagea, who had previously represented the nation in the 1948 and 1952 Games in various alpine skiing events. The competition took place on 3 February on Tofane. Geagea, skiing in sixty-ninth position, posted a time of 4 minutes, 33 seconds, in his run, finishing in forty-second place in the forty-seven person field. Keyrouz, in eighty-first position, skied the route in 4 minutes, 57 seconds, good for a placement of forty-third, just behind Geagea. Toni Sailer of Austria won the event with a time of 2 minutes, 52 seconds.

Geagea, Keyrouz, and Georges Gereidi all competed in the men's giant slalom event, held on 29 January on Mount Faloria. Of the three, Gereidi went first, skiing in ninety-fifth position. He finished his run in 5 minutes, 34 seconds, finishing in eighty-sixth place out of eighty-seven, almost two minutes ahead of last-place finisher Christos Papageorgiou of Greece. Geagea skied in ninety-seventh position and finished with a time of 4 minutes, 10 seconds, good for a ranking of seventy-first. Last of the three to go was Keyrouz, who ran in 102nd position. He ran the course in 4 minutes, 40 seconds, which put him in eighty-first. Sailer of Austria also won this event, finishing with a time of 3 minutes.

Geagea also competed in the men's slalom event, held on 31 January on Tofane. He ran in 102nd position and finished his first run in 2 minutes, 49 seconds, and his second run in 3 minutes, 18 seconds, for a grand total of 6 minutes, 8 seconds. He finished in last place out of 57 competitors, about fifteen seconds behind next-placing finisher Luis Molné of Spain. Keyrouz, slated to run in the 98th position, was disqualified in the first run. Sailer once again won the event, completing his gold medal sweep of alpine skiing events.

Men

Athlete	Event	Race 1		Race 2		Total	
Athlete	Event	Time	Rank	Time	Rank	Time	Rank
Jean Keyrouz	Downhill					4:57.6	43
Ibrahim Geagea	Downhill					4:33.1	42
Georges Gereidi	Giant Slalom					5:34.8	86
Jean Keyrouz	Giant Slalom					4:40.6	81
Ibrahim Geagea	Giant Slalom					4:10.0	71
Jean Keyrouz	Slalom	DSQ	–	–	–	DSQ	–
Ibrahim Geagea	Slalom	2:49.7	59	3:18.9	57	6:08.6	57

== Cross-country skiing ==
Although not listed in the official Olympic reports, Olympedia lists Gereidi as a competitor at the men's 15 kilometre race on 30 January at the Stadio della neve, although he was disqualified prior to the race and did not record a time. Hallgeir Brenden of Norway won the gold medal with a time of 49 minutes, 39 seconds.

Men

Athlete	Event	Race	
Athlete	Event	Time	Rank
Georges Gereidi	15 km	DSQ	–

== See also ==
- Skiing in Lebanon
