= Lebanon at the 2010 Winter Olympics =

- IOC code: LIB
- NOC: Lebanese Olympic Committee
- Website: www.lebolymp.org

in Vancouver
- Competitors: 3 in 1 sport
- Flag bearer: Chirine Njeim
- Medals: Gold 0 Silver 0 Bronze 0 Total 0

Winter Olympics appearances (overview)
- 1948; 1952; 1956; 1960; 1964; 1968; 1972; 1976; 1980; 1984; 1988; 1992; 1994–1998; 2002; 2006; 2010; 2014; 2018; 2022; 2026; 2030

Lebanon sent a delegation to compete at the 2010 Winter Olympics in Vancouver, British Columbia, Canada from 12–28 February 2010. This was Lebanon's 15th appearance at a Winter Olympic Games. The Lebanese team consisted of three alpine skiers. Lebanon has never won a medal at a Winter Olympics, and their best performance in Vancouver was 37th in the women's super-G by Chirine Njeim; Ghassan Achi failed to post a result in either of his races, and Jacky Chamoun finished 54th in her only race.

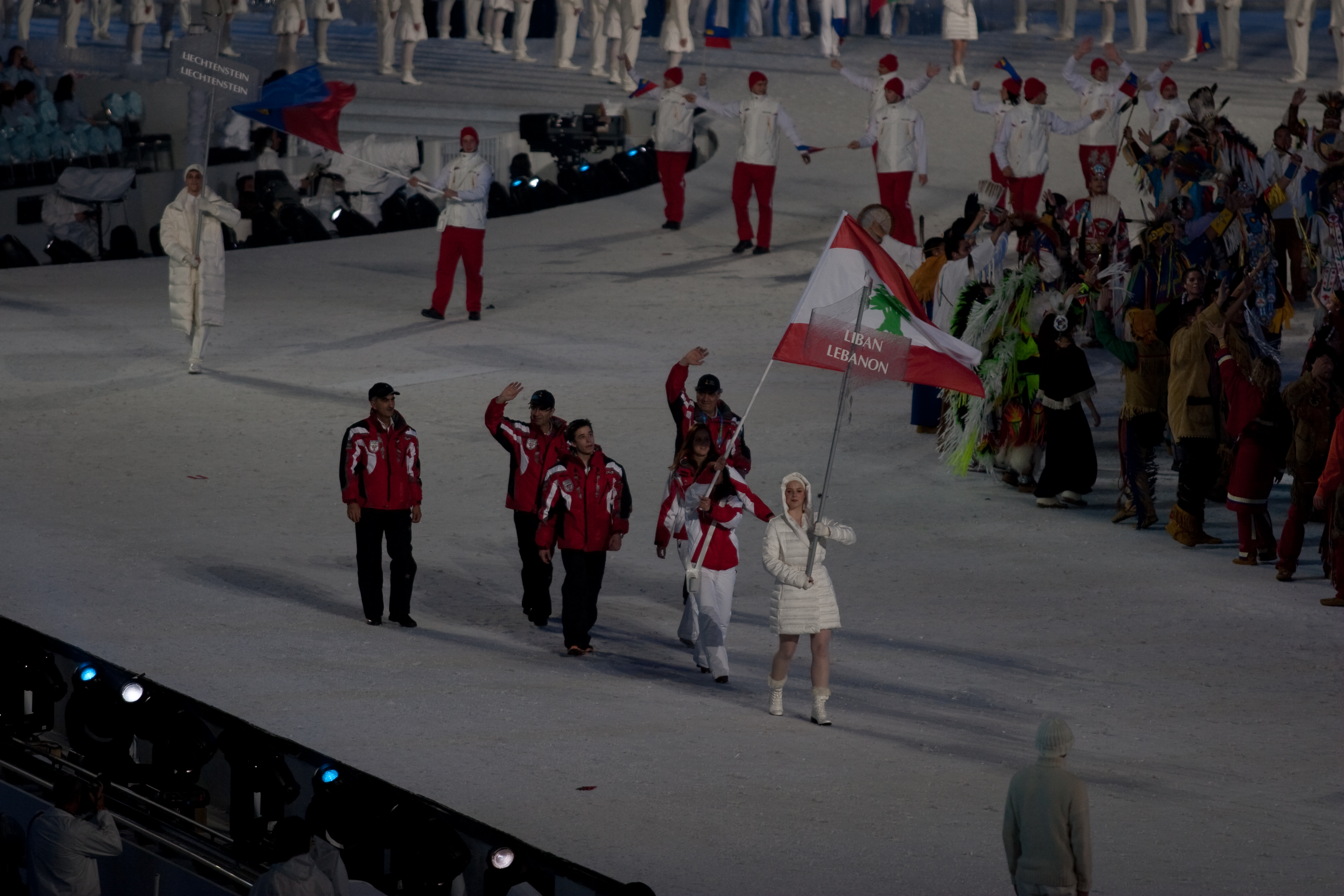
The athletes entering the stadium during the opening ceremonies.

== Background ==
The Lebanese Olympic Committee was recognized by the International Olympic Committee on 31 December 1947. The Lebanese have sent delegations to most Summer Olympics and Winter Olympic Games since then, missing the Summer Olympics only once, in 1956, and the Winter Olympics twice, in 1994 and 1998. The Lebanese delegation to Vancouver consisted of three alpine skiers; one man, Ghassan Achi and two women, Jacky Chamoun and Chirine Njeim. Njeim was chosen as the flag bearer for the opening ceremony, while Achi was chosen to carry the flag for the closing ceremony.

== Alpine skiing ==
The 25 year old Chirine Njeim made her third Winter Olympic appearance after competing in the 2002 and 2006 Winter Olympics, while 16-year-old Ghassan Achi and 18-year-old Jacky Chamoun made their debut appearances. Achi took part in the men's giant slalom on 23 February, and posted a first run time of 1 minute and 27.19 seconds. He would fail to finish the second run and went unclassified for the event. On 27 February, he was part of the men's slalom, but was disqualified during the first run.

Njeim participated in the single-run women's super-G on 20 February. She finished with a time of 1 minute and 29.59 seconds, which put her in 37th place, out of 38 competitors who finished the race. Due to weather, the women's giant slalom was held over two days, 24–25 February. Njeim finished her first run in a time of 1 minute and 23.28 seconds and her second run, the next day, in a faster time of 1 minute and 18.33 seconds. Her final combined time was 2 minutes and 41.61 seconds, which saw her in 43rd place, out of 60 athletes who finished both legs.

Both Chamoun and Njeim took part in the women's slalom, held on 26 February. In the first run, Chamoun posted a time of 1 minute and 9.41 seconds, while Njelm was faster at 58.97 seconds. Chamoun's second run time was 1 minute and 8.62 seconds, while Njeim was again faster at 59.23 seconds. Chamoun finished with a combined time of 2 minutes and 18.03 seconds, which saw her in 54th place. Njeim finished with her combined time of 1 minute and 58.20 seconds, which put her in 43rd place. A total of 55 competitors had finished both runs of the slalom. Chamoun would go on to represent Lebanon again at the 2014 Winter Olympics, while Njeim would run the marathon at the 2016 Summer Olympics.

Athlete	Event	Final			
Athlete	Event	Run 1	Run 2	Total	Rank
Ghassan Achi	Men's giant slalom	1:27.19	DNF		
Ghassan Achi	Men's slalom	DSQ			
Jacky Chamoun	Women's slalom	1:09.41	1:08.62	2:18.03	54
Chirine Njeim	Women's giant slalom	1:23.28	1:18.33	2:41.61	43
Chirine Njeim	Women's slalom	58.97	59.23	1:58.20	43
Chirine Njeim	Women's super-G			1:29.59	37

== See also ==
- Skiing in Lebanon
- Lebanon at the 2010 Summer Youth Olympics
- Lebanon at the 2010 Asian Games
