= Lebanon at the 2006 Winter Olympics =

- IOC code: LIB
- NOC: Lebanese Olympic Committee
- Website: www.lebolymp.org

in Turin
- Competitors: 3 (2 men, 1 woman) in 2 sports
- Flag bearers: Edmond Keiroue (opening); Jean Kairouz (closing)
- Medals: Gold 0 Silver 0 Bronze 0 Total 0

Winter Olympics appearances (overview)
- 1948; 1952; 1956; 1960; 1964; 1968; 1972; 1976; 1980; 1984; 1988; 1992; 1994–1998; 2002; 2006; 2010; 2014; 2018; 2022; 2026

Lebanon competed at the 2006 Winter Olympics in Turin, Italy.

== Alpine skiing ==
Athlete	Event	Final				
Athlete	Event	Run 1	Run 2	Run 3	Total	Rank
Chirine Njeim	Women's downhill	n/a			2:02.86	34
Chirine Njeim	Women's super-G	n/a			1:37.93	46
Chirine Njeim	Women's giant slalom	1:06.80	did not finish			
Chirine Njeim	Women's slalom	47.24	51.90	n/a	1:39.14	39
Chirine Njeim	Women's combined	did not finish				
George Salameh	Men's slalom	1:07.62	1:03.99	n/a	2:11.61	43

Note: In the men's combined, run 1 is the downhill, and runs 2 and 3 are the slalom. In the women's combined, run 1 and 2 are the slalom, and run 3 the downhill.

== Skeleton ==
Athlete	Event	Final			
Athlete	Event	Run 1	Run 2	Total	Rank
Patrick Antaki	Men's	1:03.01	1:01.43	2:04.44	27
