= Salameh =

Salameh (Arabic: سلامة) is a colloquial variant on the classical Arabic Salamah.

Salameh may refer to:

== People ==
=== Patronym ===
- Amram ibn Salameh ibn Ghazal ha-Kohen ha-Levi, a Samaritan liturgical poet of late antiquity

=== Given name ===
- Salameh Hammad (born 1944), Jordanian politician
- Salameh Nematt (born 1962), Jordanian journalist and analyst

=== Surname ===
- Ali Hassan Salameh (1940–1979), Palestinian chief of operations for the Black September organization
- Dalal Salameh (born 1965), Palestinian activist and former politician
- George Salameh, Lebanese Olympic alpine skier
- Hamzeh Salameh (born 1986), Lebanese footballer
- Hasan Salama or Hassan Salameh (1912–1948), Palestinian fighter
- Ibrahim Salameh (born 1945), Syrian Greek Catholic born Christian cleric, Apostolic Exarch of the Melkite Greek Catholic Apostolic Exarchate of Argentina
- Jamal Salameh (1945–2021), Egyptian songwriter and melodist
- Mohammed A. Salameh (born 1967), Palestinian perpetrator of the 1993 World Trade Center Bombing
- Mostafa Salameh (born 1970), Jordanian mountaineer
- Nadine Salameh (born 1979), Palestinian actress
- Nabil Salameh (born 1962), Palestinian singer, musician and songwriter
- Patrick Salameh (born 1957), known as The Marseille Ripper, French criminal and serial killer
- Ranin Salameh (born 1996), Arab-Israeli footballer
- Riad Salameh (born 1950), governor of the Banque du Liban
- Samir Salameh (1944–2018), Palestinian-French visual artist

== Places ==
- Al-Salameh, Syria, a village in northern Aleppo Governorate, northwestern Syria
- Salameh-ye Sofla, village in Khuzestan Province, Iran
- Salameh-ye Vosta, village in Khuzestan Province, Iran

== See also ==
- Salama (disambiguation) / also Salamah (disambiguation)
- Salami (disambiguation)
- Salameh (disambiguation)
- Salamé (disambiguation)
- Seleme
