= Lebanon at the 1960 Winter Olympics =

- IOC code: LIB (LEB used at these Games)
- NOC: Lebanese Olympic Committee
- Website: www.lebolymp.org

in Squaw Valley, United States
- Competitors: 2 (men) in 1 sport
- Medals: Gold 0 Silver 0 Bronze 0 Total 0

Winter Olympics appearances (overview)
- 1948; 1952; 1956; 1960; 1964; 1968; 1972; 1976; 1980; 1984; 1988; 1992; 1994–1998; 2002; 2006; 2010; 2014; 2018; 2022; 2026

Lebanon competed in the 1960 Winter Olympics, which was held from 18 to 28 February 1960 at the Squaw Valley Ski Resort in Olympic Valley, California, United States. This was Lebanon's fourth appearance in a Winter Games after their debut in 1948. It also marked their return to the Olympics after boycotting the 1956 Summer Olympics due to the Suez Crisis. The nation sent two male alpine skiers: Ibrahim Geagea, whose best result was 56th in the men's downhill event, and Nazih Geagea, whose best result was 49th in the men's giant slalom event.

== Background ==
The Lebanese Olympic Committee was founded in 1946 and officially recognised by the International Olympic Committee on 22 November 1947. A few months later, the nation made its debut in the 1948 Winter Olympics in St. Moritz, Switzerland. Their appearance in 1960 marked their fourth Winter Games appearance. The 1960 Games were held in Olympic Valley, California from 18 to 28 February and hosted 665 different athletes in 27 events from 30 different nations.

This also marked Lebanon's first appearance since the 1956 Winter Olympics, as they chose to withdraw from the 1956 Summer Olympics. Lebanon officially withdrew on 25 October 1956, when its International Olympic Committee (IOC) representative, Gabriel Gemayel, wrote a letter to the IOC expressing doubt in the transportation availability from Beirut to Melbourne, and the fact that preparations were underway for the 1957 Arab Games in Beirut. On 21 November, as a result of the Suez Crisis, Lebanon formally shifted its reasoning for its non-participation was to support Egypt's calls for boycott of the Games, due to French and English participation. Iraq would also later withdraw as a result of the Crisis. Scholars consider this boycott to be an example of Pan-Arabism. Because they withdrew for an explicitly political reason, Lebanon violated Rule 1 of the Olympic Charter. As such, the IOC officially condemned Lebanon and Iraq, along with the three European nations who boycotted following the Hungarian Revolution of 1956, and the People's Republic of China, for withdrawing from the Games.

For the 1960 Winter games, Lebanon sent two alpine skiers to the Games: Ibrahim Geagea, who has participated for the country in every Games to this point since their debut in 1948, and Nazih Geagea, an 18-year old making his debut. Nazih Geagea's cousin, Jean Keyrouz, who represented the nation in skiing events at the 1956 Winter Games, was meant to compete at the 1960 Games. However, due to financial constraints, he voluntarily gave up his spot to Nazih. Despite the fact that he was not in the country, he was still listed in the initial starting and results lists of the men's slalom event.

== Alpine skiing ==
Lebanon's two alpine skiers competed in three events. On 21 February, the first alpine event of the Olympics, the men's giant slalom competition, was held along the KT-22 route at the resort. Nazih posted a time of 2 minutes, 20 seconds, to place 49th out of 58, while Ibrahim's time of 2 minutes, 29 seconds, placed him in 57th place, 3 seconds ahead of last-place finisher Sam Chaffey of New Zealand. With a time of 1 minute, 48 seconds, Roger Staub of Switzerland won the gold medal.

The following day, the men's downhill competition was held atop Squaw Peak. Originally slated to be the first alpine event, a three-day snowstorm postponed it. With a time of 2 minutes, 39 seconds, Ibrahim finished in 56th place out of 61, while Nazih, who finished in 3 minutes, was ranked 59th. The gold medal was won by Jean Vuarnet of France, with a time of 2 minutes, 6 seconds.

On the 24th, the men's slalom competition was held on the KT-22 route. Nazih posted a time of 1 minute, 22 seconds, on his first run, which placed him 34th among all competitors. However, he was disqualified during his second run and did not finish the race. Meanwhile, Ibrahim and the aforementioned Keyrouz were listed as not starting. Ernst Hinterseer of Austria won the gold with a combined time of 2 minutes, 8 seconds.

Men

Athlete	Event	Race 1		Race 2		Total	
Athlete	Event	Time	Rank	Time	Rank	Time	Rank
Nazih Geagea	Downhill					3:00.3	59
Ibrahim Geagea	Downhill					2:39.2	56
Ibrahim Geagea	Giant Slalom					2:29.1	57
Nazih Geagea	Giant Slalom					2:20.3	49
Nazih Geagea	Slalom	1:22.4	34	DSQ	–	DSQ	–
