= Jackie Chamoun =

Lebanese alpine skier

Personal information
- Born: 21 October 1991 (age 35) Deir el Qamar, Lebanon
- Height: 175 cm (5 ft 9 in)

Skiing career
- Sport: Alpine skiing ♀
- Club: Club Le Chalet
- Disciplines: Slalom, giant slalom

Olympics
- Teams: 2 – (2010–2014)

World Championships
- Teams: 2 – (2009–2013)

Jackie Chamoun (born 21 October 1991) is a Lebanese alpine skier. At the age of 14, she started participating in professional skiing events (slalom and giant slalom) all around the world. She participated in FIS Alpine World Ski Championships in 2009 as well as in 2013. She has skied for Lebanon at the Winter Olympics in 2010 and 2014.

== Education ==
Chamoun studied Sports Management at the Glion Institute of Higher Education, Switzerland and hopes to improve sports in Lebanon by encouraging children to participate in athletics, and putting in place better practice facilities. While she was in school, she interned in Paris in Havas Sports and in Monaco in Peace and Sport.

== Skiing career ==
Chamoun became a skier at age 3 in Lebanon's kfardebian. At 14, she started to compete professionally in alpine skiing. She competed at the World Ski Championships at Val D'Isere in 2009.

At the age of 18, Chamoun represented her country in the 2010 Winter Olympics that took place in Vancouver and finished in 54th place in slalom.

"It is very nice to represent our country," Chamoun said. "People are surprised to see us there because they don’t expect Lebanon in the Winter Olympic Games. But we are really glad to have this chance to be a part of the Olympics and be able to exchange with people from other nationalities and talk about our culture and discover other cultures."

—

She competed at the World Ski Championships at Schladming in 2013.

She participated at the 2014 Winter Olympics in Sochi, as Lebanon’s only female skier to compete in the Olympic Games in both the slalom and the giant slalom. Her participation at the Olympics became controversial in Lebanon after it was revealed at home in 2014 that she had posed in sexy photos for an Austrian calendar in 2011 by Hubertus von Hohenlohe. A ministerial investigation has been mooted, while an online support protest "Strip for Jackie" has been organized. Chamoun has denied that she posed nude publicly on her Facebook page, saying that the behind the scenes images were not for publication. She finished 47th in slalom at the Games, 44.20s behind the leader. After the first run, she was 58th with a time of 1:16.05 some 23 seconds behind the leader, after having started 87th. After both runs she was 47th with a total time of 2:28.74.

== Personal life ==
Jackie is the daughter of Gabriel Chamoun and Denise Chehab and the grand daughter of Dory Chamoun.

In May 2017, she married former French footballer and World cup winner Christian Karembeu in Lebanon. The couple announced the birth of their daughter later in the year.

== Achievements ==
- 2014: Olympics - 47th (slalom)
- 2013: World Championships – 84th (giant slalom), 88th (slalom)
- 2013: Lebanese National Championships – Silver (slalom), Bronze (giant slalom)
- 2010: Olympics – 54th (slalom)
- 2009: World Championships – 47th (slalom)
- 2009: Lebanese National Championships – Gold (slalom), Silver (giant slalom)
- 2008: Lebanese National Championships – Bronze (slalom), 5th (giant slalom)
- 2007: Lebanese National Championships – Bronze (giant slalom)
