= Lebanon at the 2026 Winter Olympics =

- Flag of Lebanon
- IOC code: LBN
- NOC: Lebanese Olympic Committee
- Website: www.lebolymp.org

in Milan and Cortina d'Ampezzo, Italy 6 February 2026 – 22 February 2026
- Competitors: 2 (2 men) in 2 sports
- Flag bearer (opening): Andrea El Hayek
- Flag bearer (closing): Samer Tawk
- Medals: Gold 0 Silver 0 Bronze 0 Total 0

Winter Olympics appearances (overview)
- 1948; 1952; 1956; 1960; 1964; 1968; 1972; 1976; 1980; 1984; 1988; 1992; 1994–1998; 2002; 2006; 2010; 2014; 2018; 2022; 2026

Lebanon competed at the 2026 Winter Olympics in Milan and Cortina d'Ampezzo, Italy, from 6 to 22 February 2026.

Alpine skier Andrea El Hayek was the country's flagbearer during the opening ceremony. Meanwhile, Samer Tawk was the country's flagbearer during the closing ceremony.

== Competitors ==
The following is the list of number of competitors participating at the Games per sport/discipline.

Sport	Men	Women	Total
Alpine skiing	1	0	1
Cross-country skiing	1	0	1
Total	2	0	2

== Alpine skiing ==
Lebanon qualified one female and one male alpine skier through the basic quota. Manon Ouaiss qualified to represent the country for the second consecutive Games but withdrew due to injury.

Athlete	Event	Run 1		Run 2		Total	
Athlete	Event	Time	Rank	Time	Rank	Time	Rank
Andrea El Hayek	Men's slalom	1:10.64	38	DNF			

== Cross-country skiing ==
Following the completion of the 2025–26 FIS Cross-Country World Cup in the first World Cup period (28 November – 14 December 2025), Lebanon qualified one male athlete.

Distance

Athlete	Event	Final		
Athlete	Event	Time	Deficit	Rank
Samer Tawk	Men's 10 km freestyle	29:50.1	+9:13.9	107
