= Lebanon at the 2018 Winter Olympics =

- Flag of Lebanon
- IOC code: LBN
- NOC: Lebanese Olympic Committee
- Website: www.lebolymp.org

in Pyeongchang, South Korea 9–25 February 2018
- Competitors: 3 in 2 sports
- Flag bearer: Samer Tawk (opening)
- Medals: Gold 0 Silver 0 Bronze 0 Total 0

Winter Olympics appearances (overview)
- 1948; 1952; 1956; 1960; 1964; 1968; 1972; 1976; 1980; 1984; 1988; 1992; 1994–1998; 2002; 2006; 2010; 2014; 2018; 2022; 2026

Lebanon competed at the 2018 Winter Olympics in Pyeongchang, South Korea, from 9 to 25 February 2018. The country's participation in Pyeongchang marked its seventeenth appearance in the Winter Olympics after its debut in the 1948 Winter Olympics.

Lebanon was represented by three athletes who competed across two sports. Samer Tawk served as the country's flag-bearer during the opening ceremony and a volunteer carried the flag during the closing ceremony. Lebanon did not win any medals in the Games.

== Background ==
The Lebanese Olympic Committee was recognized by the International Olympic Committee in 1948. It made its first Olympics appearance as an independent nation at the 1948 Summer Olympics. The current edition marked its seventeenth appearance at the Winter Games after its debut in the 1948 Winter Olympics.

The 2018 Winter Olympics were held in Pyeongchang, South Korea between 9 and 25 February 2018. Lebanon was represented by three athletes. Samer Tawk served as the country's flag-bearer during the opening ceremony, and a volunteer carried the flag during the closing ceremony. Lebanon did not win a medal in the Games.

== Competitors ==
The nation was represented by three athletes who competed in two sports.

Sport	Men	Women	Total
Alpine skiing	1	1	2
Cross-country skiing	1	0	1
Total	2	1	3

== Alpine skiing ==
Lebanon qualified two alpine skiers, one male and one female. Allen Behlok and Natacha Mohbat both made their debut at the Winter Olympics.

The Alpine skiing events were held at the Jeongseon Alpine Centre in Bukpyeong. The course for the events was designed by former Olympic champion Bernhard Russi. The weather was cold and windy during the events, and it was the coldest since the 1994 Winter Olympics at Lillehammer. Behlok recorded his best finish in the men's giant slalom event, after he was ranked 71st amongst the 109 competitors. He did not finish the men's slalom event. Mohbat recorded a 52nd place finish amongst the 78 competitors in the women's slalom event.

Athlete	Event	Run 1		Run 2		Total	
Athlete	Event	Time	Rank	Time	Rank	Time	Rank
Allen Behlok	Men's giant slalom	1:26.70	80	1:25.43	71	2:52.13	71
Allen Behlok	Men's slalom	DNF					
Natacha Mohbat	Women's slalom	1:06.73	57	1:05.31	53	2:12.04	52

== Cross-country skiing ==
As per the standards laid down by the International Ski Federation, athletes with a maximum of 300 points in the stipulated period were allowed to compete in the distance event. Lebanon qualified one male cross-country skier. This will mark the country's first participation in the sport since 1956.

The main event was held on 16 February 2018 at the Alpensia Cross-Country Skiing Centre. Flag-bearer Tawk completed the 15 km (9.3 mi) course in 47:03.4. He finished the race in 109th position (out of 119 competitors), more than thirteen minutes behind the winner, Dario Cologna of Switzerland. (Note: Gaiduc finished 114th amongst those who had completed the course. He was classified in 109th after five athletes were disqualified later.)

Distance

Athlete	Event	Final		
Athlete	Event	Time	Deficit	Rank
Samer Tawk	Men's 15 km freestyle	47:03.4	+13:19.5	109

== See also ==
- Lebanon at the 2017 Asian Winter Games
- Lebanon at the 2018 Summer Youth Olympics
