= Lebanon at the 1952 Winter Olympics =

- IOC code: LIB
- NOC: Lebanese Olympic Committee
- Website: www.lebolymp.org

in Oslo
- Competitors: 1 (man) in 1 sport
- Medals: Gold 0 Silver 0 Bronze 0 Total 0

Winter Olympics appearances (overview)
- 1948; 1952; 1956; 1960; 1964; 1968; 1972; 1976; 1980; 1984; 1988; 1992; 1994–1998; 2002; 2006; 2010; 2014; 2018; 2022; 2026; 2030

Lebanon sent a delegation to compete at the 1952 Winter Olympics in Oslo, Norway from 14 to 25 February 1952. This was the country's second time competing in a Winter Olympic Games, after their first appearance four years prior. Lebanon was represented in these Olympics by a single alpine skier, Ibrahim Geagea. He competed in three events, and his best finish was 57th in the men's downhill competition.

== Background ==
The Lebanese Olympic Committee was recognised by the International Olympic Committee on 31 December 1947. They joined Olympic competition less than a month later, participating in the 1948 Winter Olympics. The 1952 Winter Olympics were held in Oslo, Norway from 14 to 25 February 1952; a total of 694 athletes representing 30 National Olympic Committees took part. These Oslo Olympics were therefore Lebanon's second appearance at a Winter Olympic Games. Lebanon sent a single competitor to Oslo, Ibrahim Geagea, who competed in three events in alpine skiing.

== Alpine skiing ==
Ibrahim Geagea was 27 years old at the time of the Oslo Olympics, and was making the second of his four consecutive Olympic appearances. On 15 February, he took part in the single-run men's giant slalom race, and finished the course in a time of 3 minutes and 52.8 seconds, which put him in 82nd and last place among those athletes that completed the event. The gold medal was won in 2 minutes and 25 seconds by Stein Eriksen of Norway; the silver and bronze medals were both won by Austrians, Christian Pravda and Toni Spiss respectively.

The next day, Geagea participated in another single-run race, the men's downhill. He finished the competition in a time of 3 minutes and 20.2 seconds, which ranked him 57th out of 72 finishing competitors. The gold medal was won in 2 minutes and 30.8 seconds by Zeno Colò of Italy; Austrians again took both the silver and bronze medals, with Othmar Schneider winning the silver and Pravda the bronze. The third and final alpine skiing event for men in Oslo was the slalom, held on 19 February over two legs. Geagea's Olympics were over when he failed to finish the first run. Schneider eventually won the gold medal, with Norwegians Eriksen and Guttorm Berge taking the silver and bronze medals.

Athlete	Event	Race 1		Race 2		Total	
Athlete	Event	Time	Rank	Time	Rank	Time	Rank
Ibrahim Geagea	Men's downhill					3:20.2	57
Ibrahim Geagea	Men's giant slalom					3:52.8	82
Ibrahim Geagea	Men's slalom	DNF	–	did not advance			

== See also ==
- Lebanon at the 1952 Summer Olympics
