= Lebanon at the 1984 Winter Olympics =

- IOC code: LIB
- NOC: Lebanese Olympic Committee
- Website: www.lebolymp.org

in Sarajevo
- Competitors: 4 (men) in 1 sport
- Medals: Gold 0 Silver 0 Bronze 0 Total 0

Winter Olympics appearances (overview)
- 1948; 1952; 1956; 1960; 1964; 1968; 1972; 1976; 1980; 1984; 1988; 1992; 1994–1998; 2002; 2006; 2010; 2014; 2018; 2022; 2026; 2030

Lebanon competed at the 1984 Winter Olympics in Sarajevo, Yugoslavia.

== Alpine skiing ==
Men

Athlete	Event	Race 1		Race 2		Total	
Athlete	Event	Time	Rank	Time	Rank	Time	Rank
Edward Samen	Giant Slalom	1:52.51	71	2:05.34	73	3:57.85	72
Nabil Khalil	Giant Slalom	1:48.38	67	1:59.31	68	3:47.69	66
Sotirios Axiotiades	Giant Slalom	1:46.67	66	1:53.95	64	3:40.62	62
Tony Sukkar	Giant Slalom	1:43.48	61	1:45.55	56	3:29.03	58
Tony Sukkar	Slalom	DNF	–	–	–	DNF	–
Edward Samen	Slalom	1:19.93	61	1:19.16	45	2:39.09	42
Sotirios Axiotiades	Slalom	1:15.54	57	DNF	–	DNF	–
Nabil Khalil	Slalom	1:14.54	55	1:13.73	39	2:28.27	39
