= Raja Abu 'Amasha =

Early Palestinian activist

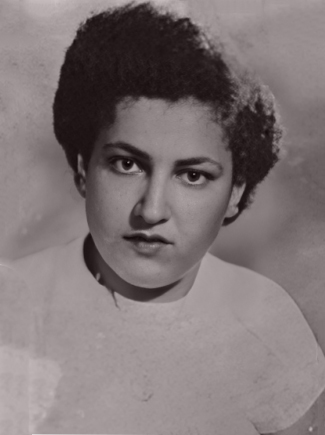
- Born: 1938; Salama, Jaffa, Mandatory Palestine
- Died: 1955 (aged 16–17); Jerusalem
- Occupation: Activist

Raja Abu 'Amasha (1938–1955) was a Palestinian activist known for her role in student and nationalist movements during the early stages of the Palestinian struggle.

== Biography ==
Raja Abu 'Amasha was born in Salama near Jaffa in 1938. Her life was disrupted by the Nakba in 1948, after which she lived as a refugee in Aqabat Jaber camp near Jericho.

Raja Abu 'Amasha received part of her primary education in schools located in Jaffa before the Nakba. After becoming a refugee, she continued her education in Jericho schools and later completed her secondary education at Al Mamounia School in Jerusalem in 1952. She became an active member of student and women's movements in the West Bank and helped develop the General Union of Palestinian Students.

In 1955, she led a protest in Jerusalem against the Baghdad Pact, a Western-backed alliance viewed as undermining Arab independence. She was killed during the protest, making her a symbol of resistance and the first female martyr of the student movement.

== Legacy ==
A clinic in the Yarmouk Camp for Palestinian refugees is named after her.
