= Lebanon at the 1976 Winter Olympics =

- IOC code: LIB
- NOC: Lebanese Olympic Committee
- Website: www.lebolymp.org

in Innsbruck
- Competitors: 1 (woman) in 1 sport
- Medals: Gold 0 Silver 0 Bronze 0 Total 0

Winter Olympics appearances (overview)
- 1948; 1952; 1956; 1960; 1964; 1968; 1972; 1976; 1980; 1984; 1988; 1992; 1994–1998; 2002; 2006; 2010; 2014; 2018; 2022; 2026

The West Asian country of Lebanon competed at the 1976 Winter Olympics in Innsbruck, Austria, which was held from 4 February to 15 February 1976. This marked Lebanon's eighth appearance in a Winter Games since their debut in 1948. The delegation consisted of a single female alpine skier, Farida Rahmeh, who finished 43rd in the women's giant slalom event, thus failing to win a medal.

== Background ==
The Lebanese Olympic Committee was founded in 1946 and officially recognised by the International Olympic Committee on 22 November 1947. A few months later, the nation made its debut in the 1948 Winter Olympics in St. Moritz, Switzerland. Up to this point, Lebanon had not missed a Games except for the 1956 Summer Olympics in Melbourne, Australia, which they boycotted along with Egypt and Iraq in protest of the Suez Crisis.

The 1976 Winter Olympics were held in Innsbruck, Austria, from 4 to 15 February 1976. The Games in Innsbruck hosted 1,123 athletes in 37 events from 37 different nations. Lebanon's participation marked their eighth appearance in a Winter Games.

The preparations for the Games were marred by the Lebanese Civil War, which begun less than a year prior to the Winter Olympics were to commence in Innsbruck. While originally, it was desired to send a full delegation, including three more athletes and officials from the nation, Lebanon was only able to send a single athlete to Innsbruck, alpine skier Farida Rahmeh, who competed in one event. Rahmeh, a 23-year old university graduate who had been skiing for seven years to this point, attributed her access to Olympic accreditation to being outside the country, as she had worked at a tourist office in Frankfurt at the onset of the war. Other Olympic hopefuls who remained in Lebanon were unable to receive the accreditation. Notably, Lebanon was the only nation at the games to not participate in the opening ceremony, as Rahmeh did not arrive in Innsbruck in time for the ceremony, a fact that she expressed disappointment in, saying "I wanted to carry the flag to show the world that everything now is all right in my country. It would have helped us because we are a small country in the Olympics."

== Alpine skiing ==
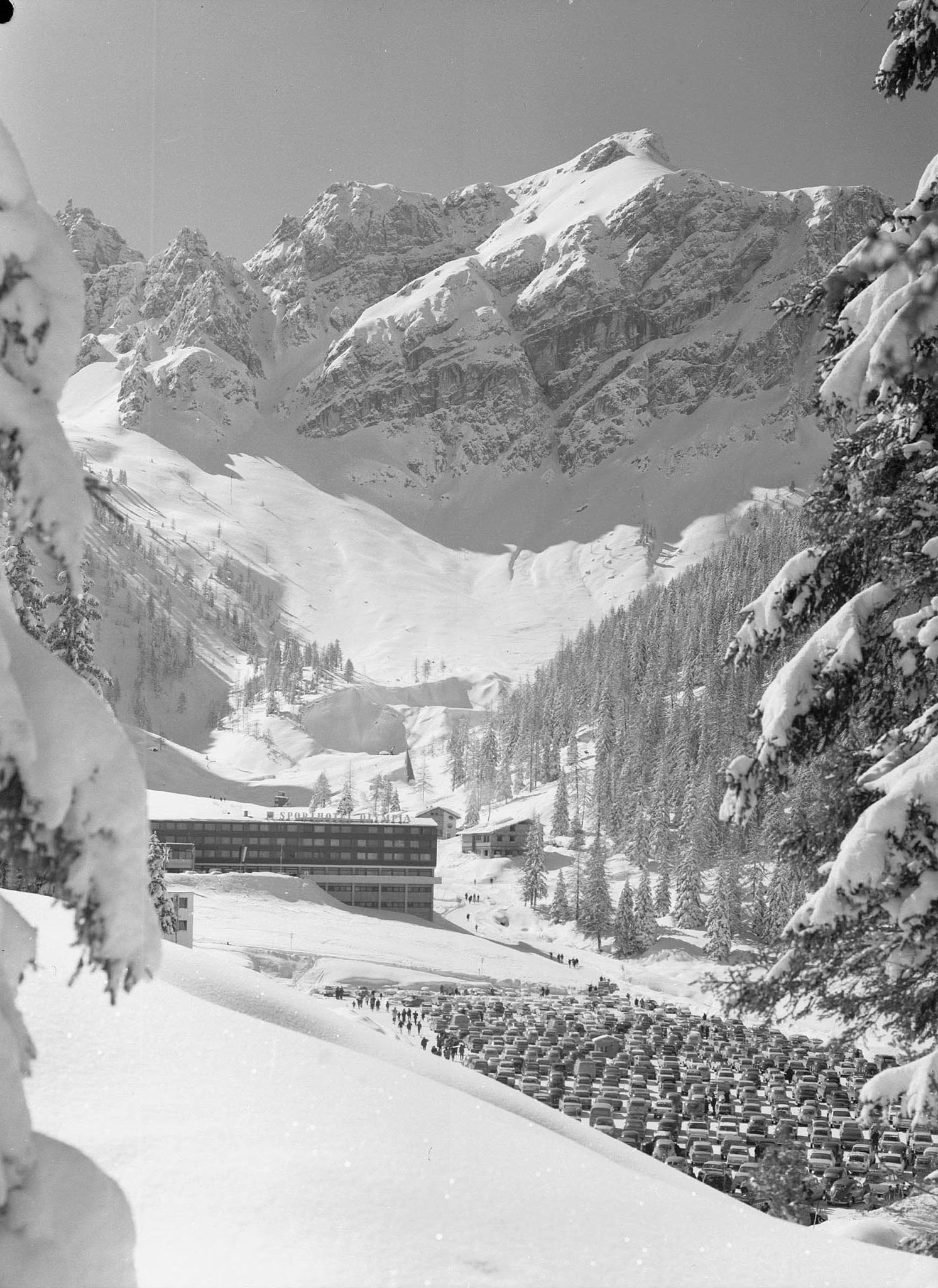
Axamer Lizum, where the alpine skiing events for the 1976 Olympics were held

Farida Rahmeh competed in one event at the Games, her first of two appearances, as she would also compete in the 1980 Winter Olympics in Lake Placid, New York, in the United States. On 13 February, Rahmeh competed in the women's giant slalom event in Axamer Lizum. Rahmeh finished her run in a time of 2 minutes, 11.08 seconds, placing her 43rd out of 43 finishers. Her time was about 22 seconds higher than the next-placing finisher, Sue Gibson of New Zealand, and about 42 seconds higher than gold medal winner Kathy Kreiner of Canada.

Rahmeh was also listed as a competitor for the women's slalom event on 11 February, however she did not start the race and therefore did not record a result.

Women

| Athlete | Event | Total | |
| Athlete | Event | Time | Rank |
|---|---|---|---|
| Farida Rahmeh | Giant Slalom | 2:11.08 | 43 |
| Farida Rahmeh | Slalom | DNS | -- |
