= Lebanon at the 2002 Winter Olympics =

- IOC code: LIB
- NOC: Lebanese Olympic Committee
- Website: www.lebolymp.org

in Salt Lake City, Utah
- Competitors: 2 (1 man, 1 woman) in 1 sport
- Flag bearer: Chirine Njeim
- Medals: Gold 0 Silver 0 Bronze 0 Total 0

Winter Olympics appearances (overview)
- 1948; 1952; 1956; 1960; 1964; 1968; 1972; 1976; 1980; 1984; 1988; 1992; 1994–1998; 2002; 2006; 2010; 2014; 2018; 2022; 2026

Lebanon was represented at the 2002 Winter Olympics in Salt Lake City, Utah, United States by the Lebanese Olympic Committee.

In total, two athletes including one man and one woman represented Lebanon in alpine skiing.

== Background ==
The 2002 Winter Olympics would be Lebanon's 13th appearance at the Winter Olympics. The country had achieved a streak of 12 consecutive appearances at the Winter Olympics following their debut at the 1948 Winter Olympics in St. Moritz, Switzerland. However, that run would end as they missed the 1994 Winter Olympics in Lillehammer, Norway and the 1998 Winter Olympics in Nagano, Japan.

== Competitors ==
In total, two athletes represented Lebanon at the 2002 Winter Olympics in Salt Lake City, Utah, United States across one sport.

Sport	Men	Women	Total
Alpine skiing	1	1	2
Total	1	1	2

== Alpine skiing ==
In total, two Lebanese athletes participated in the alpine skiing events – Niki Fürstauer in the men's slalom and Chirine Njeim in the women's giant slalom and the women's slalom.

The alpine skiing events took place from 20 to 23 February 2002 at various venues. The giant slaloms took place at Park City Mountain Resort in Park City, Utah, United States and the slaloms took place at Deer Valley, also in Park City.

The women's slalom took place on 20 February 2002. Njeim completed her first run in one minute 5.54 seconds and her second run in one minute 7.94 seconds for a combined time of two minutes 13.48 seconds to finish 36th overall.

The women's giant slalom took place on 22 February 2002. Njeim completed her first run in one minute 27.76 seconds and her second run in one minute 25.66 seconds for a combined time of two minutes 53.42 seconds to finish 45th overall.

The men's slalom took place on 23 February 2002. Fürstauer completed his first run in 51.99 seconds. He did not finish his second run.

Athlete	Event	Race 1	Race 2	Total	
Athlete	Event	Time	Time	Time	Rank
Niki Fürstauer	Men's slalom	51.99	DNF	DNF	–
Chirine Njeim	Women's giant slalom	1:27.76	1:25.66	2:53.42	45
Chirine Njeim	Women's slalom	1:05.54	1:07.94	2:13.48	36
