= Lebanon at the 1964 Winter Olympics =

- IOC code: LIB
- NOC: Lebanese Olympic Committee
- Website: www.lebolymp.org

in Innsbruck
- Competitors: 4 (men) in 1 sport
- Medals: Gold 0 Silver 0 Bronze 0 Total 0

Winter Olympics appearances (overview)
- 1948; 1952; 1956; 1960; 1964; 1968; 1972; 1976; 1980; 1984; 1988; 1992; 1994–1998; 2002; 2006; 2010; 2014; 2018; 2022; 2026

Lebanon competed at the 1964 Winter Olympics in Innsbruck, Austria.

== Alpine skiing ==
Men

Athlete	Event	Race	
Athlete	Event	Time	Rank
Sami Beyroun	Downhill	DNF	–
Michel Rahme	Downhill	3:55.15	75
Jean Keyrouz	Downhill	3:40.44	74
Nazih Geagea	Downhill	2:55.34	67
Sami Beyroun	Giant Slalom	3:14.65	80
Jean Keyrouz	Giant Slalom	2:44.51	76
Michel Rahme	Giant Slalom	2:42.28	75
Wael Jamal	Giant Slalom	2:30.24	70

Men's slalom

Athlete	Qualifying				Final					
Athlete	Time 1	Rank	Time 2	Rank	Time 1	Rank	Time 2	Rank	Total	Rank
Sami Beyroun	DNF	–	DSQ	–	did not advance					
Michel Rahme	1:26.76	81	1:21.19	53	did not advance					
Jean Keyrouz	1:17.36	75	1:16.24	52	did not advance					
Nazih Geagea	1:08.21	61	1:06.15	45	did not advance					
