= Lebanon at the 1948 Winter Olympics =

- IOC code: LIB
- NOC: Lebanese Olympic Committee
- Website: www.lebolymp.org

in St. Moritz
- Competitors: 2 in 1 sports
- Medals: Gold 0 Silver 0 Bronze 0 Total 0

Winter Olympics appearances (overview)
- 1948; 1952; 1956; 1960; 1964; 1968; 1972; 1976; 1980; 1984; 1988; 1992; 1994–1998; 2002; 2006; 2010; 2014; 2018; 2022; 2026; 2030

Lebanon competed in the 1948 Winter Olympics in St. Moritz, Switzerland, which was held from 30 January to 8 February 1948. This was Lebanon's first appearance in a Winter Olympic Games, as well as their first appearance in any Olympic Games. The delegation sent two male alpine skiers: Ibrahim Geagea and Munir Itani. The delegation failed to win any medals during these Games.

== Background ==
Skiing was first introduced in Lebanon in 1913, when Ramez Ghazzaoui, an engineering student, brought the sport back after visiting Switzerland. While Greater Lebanon was under the administration of France, French soldiers would further popularize skiing, opening up a ski school in the 1930s—an early predecessor to the Lebanese Army Skiing and Mountain Fighting School in use today. In 1934, the first Lebanese ski club was founded. More were created in subsequent years and soon domestic competitions on slopes across the nation took place, with Lebanon's first appearance in international competition coming in 1947, at an event in Chamonix.

Prior to Lebanon's first appearance in an Olympic Games, an official delegation of representatives from the Lebanese Football Association, led by president Pierre Gemayel, attended the 1936 Summer Olympics in Berlin, Germany. There, Gemayel was influenced by the German people's nationalism and discipline. The visit helped influence him to establish the right-wing Kataeb Party.

The Republic of Lebanon declared independence from France on 22 November 1943. Three years later, on 28 December 1946, the Lebanese Olympic Committee was founded by national decree 1350 and officially recognized by the International Olympic Committee (IOC) on 22 November 1947. Following advice from Greek IOC representative Angelo Bolanaki, Sheik Gabriel Gemayel, of the Gemayel family, was the first president of the committee. Following recognition, Lebanon competed in its first ever Olympic Games when it sent two male alpine skiers, Ibrahim Geagea and Munir Itani, to the 1948 Winter Olympics in St. Moritz.

== Alpine skiing ==
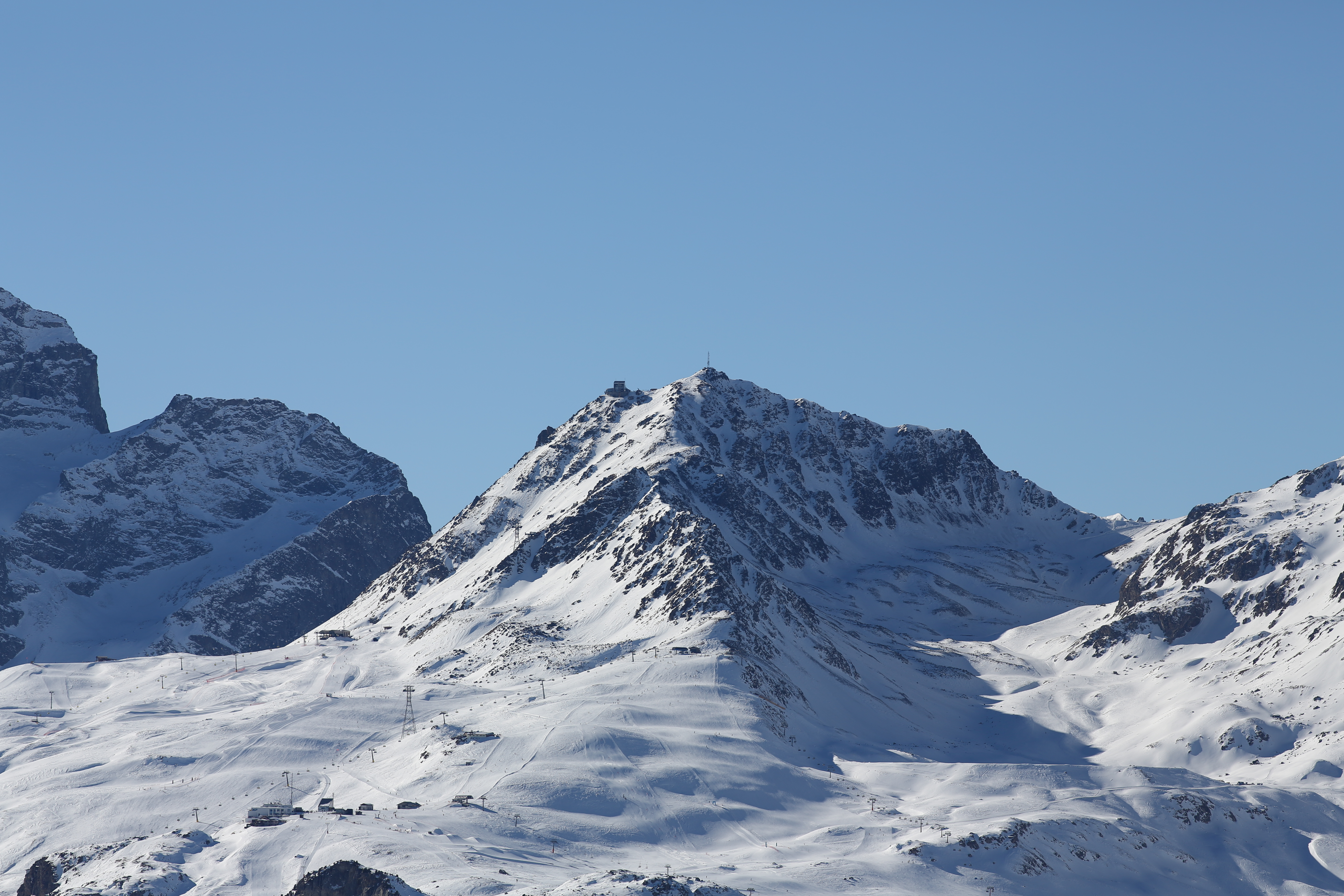
Piz Nair, where the alpine skiing events were held

Aged 23, skier Ibrahim Geagea represented Lebanon in the downhill and slalom events, which both made their debut at this year's games. On 2 February, the downhill event was held, although Geagea was disqualified from the competition, along with Turkish competitor Muzaffer Demirhan. On 5 February, Geagea competed in the slalom event. On his first run, he finished the run in 2 minutes, 49 seconds, with a 5-second penalty added to his time. This run was ranked last among the 66 athletes. He fared better on his second run, completing it in 1 minute, 44 seconds, with no penalty incurred and ranked 60th among competitors. However, his combined time of 4 minutes, 34 seconds, placed him last in the competition, 7 seconds behind next-finishing Ramón Blanco of Spain.

Munar Itani, who helped establish Lebanon's first ski club, represented the nation in the combined event. However, Itani did not start in either the downhill or slalom portions, and posted no official result during these Games.

Men's individual

Athlete	Event	Race 1		Race 2		Total	
Athlete	Event	Time	Rank	Time	Rank	Time	Rank
Ibrahim Geagea	Downhill					DSQ	–
Ibrahim Geagea	Slalom	2:49.3*	66	1:44.8	60	4:34.1	66

Men's combined

The downhill part of this event was held along with the main medal event of downhill skiing. For athletes competing in both events, the same time was used (see table above for the results). The slalom part of the event was held separate from the main medal event of slalom skiing (included in table below).

Athlete	Slalom			Total (downhill + slalom)	
Athlete	Time 1	Time 2	Rank	Points	Rank
Munir Itani	–	–	–	DNF	–

== See also ==
- Skiing in Lebanon
- Lebanon at the 1948 Summer Olympics
