= Sidna Salama Mosque =

Abandoned mosque located in Jaffa

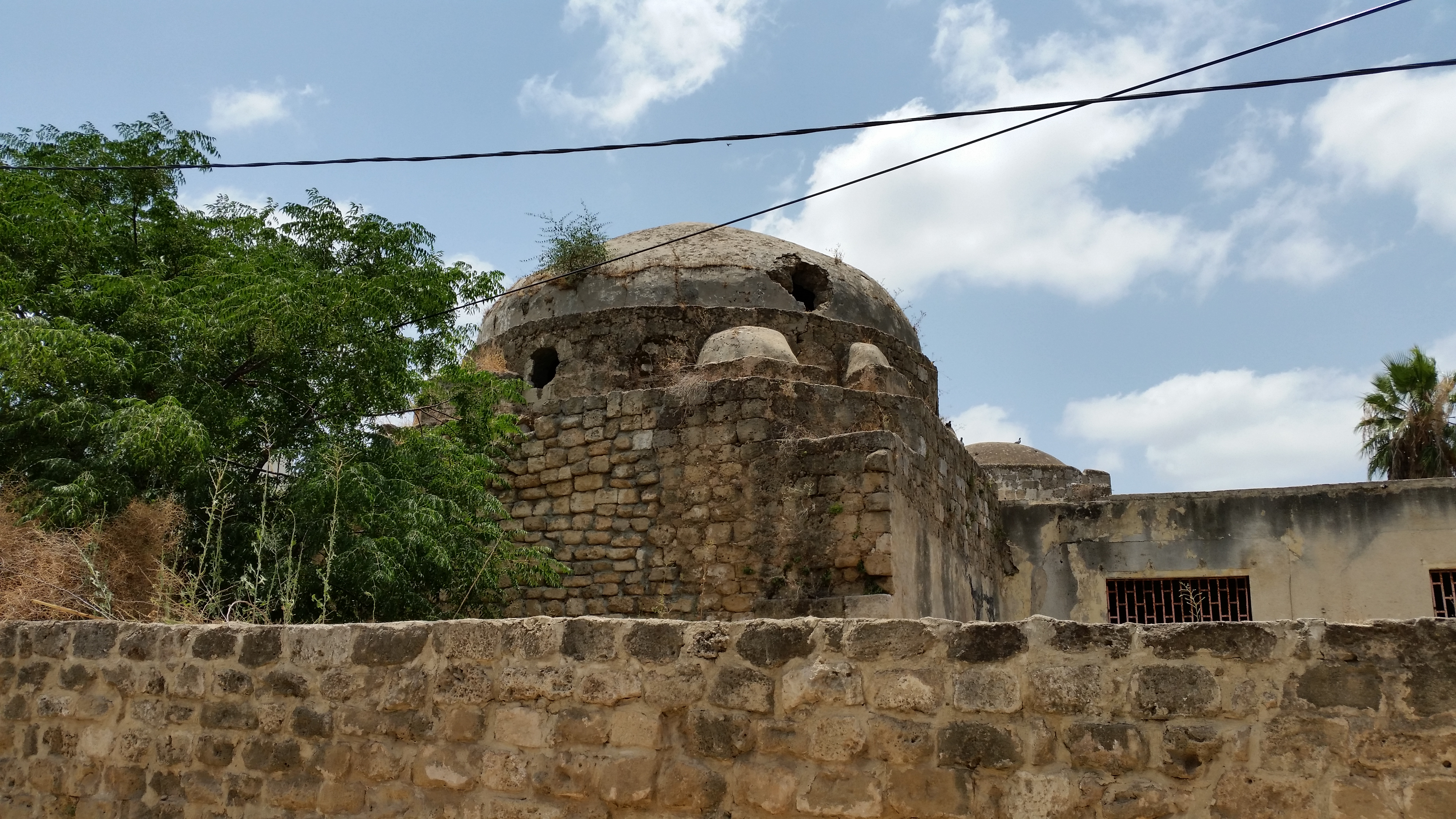
- View of the mosque from outside the walled courtyard in 2017.
- Interactive map of Sidna Salama Mosque
- 32°02′59″N 34°48′20″E
- Type: Mosque
- Location: Salama, Jaffa

History
- Built: 1810 (reconstruction; original date of construction unknown)

Site notes
- Architectural style: Ottoman architecture

The Sidna Salama Mosque (Arabic: مسجد سيدنا سلامة, lit. Masjid Sayyidinā Salāmah, Hebrew: מסגד סידנא סלמה) is an abandoned mosque formerly located in the centre of the now-defunct village of Salama in Mandatory Palestine, five kilometres east of Kfar Shalem in Tel Aviv, Israel. Although its date of construction is unknown, the present day mosque was rebuilt in 1810 by Muhammad Abu Nabbut, the governor of Jaffa under Ottoman suzerainty. After the 1948 Arab–Israeli conflict, the village of Salama was depopulated and hence resulted in the abandonment of the mosque. The ruined structure is currently locked up on all sides and is not accessible to the public.

Before 1980, the mosque served as a community centre for locals of Salama. It was also an important religious site for the villagers, who held prayers at the mosque for Salama Abu Hashim, the namesake of the mosque. During the mid-1980s, the Tel Aviv-Yafo Municipality sealed up the mosque completely, preventing the usage of the mosque for prayers.

== Etymology ==
The mosque is named after Salama Abu Hashim ibn al-Mughirah, a companion of the Islamic prophet Muhammad who came from the Banu Makhzum tribe, who is known to locals as Sheikh Salama.

== Architecture ==
The layout of the Sidna Salama Mosque is a rectangular plan comprising a prayer hall, courtyard, ablution area, as well as the shrine of Salama Abu Hashim. To the left of the main entrance of the complex is the entrance to the shrine, while the entrance to the main prayer hall of the mosque is located in the centre. To align with Islamic burial customs that forbid the graves from being located behind the qibla of a mosque, the shrine room is located on the left of the main prayer hall, hence preventing the grave from being in the direction of prayer. A simple mihrab is embedded in the wall, flanked by a minbar made out of concrete.

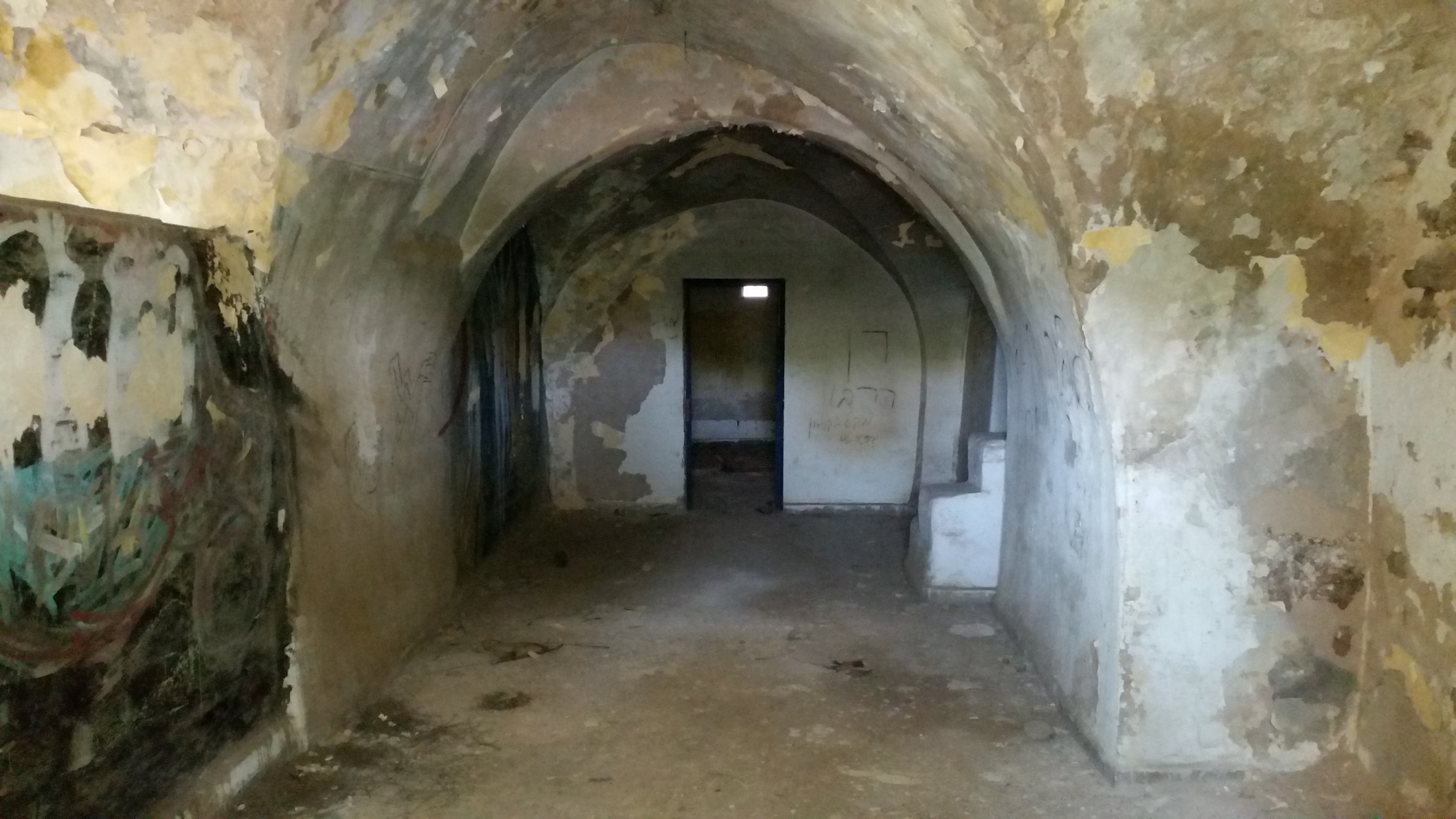
Interior of the main prayer hall, the minbar slightly visible on the right, while the doorway in the centre leads into the shrine.

The shrine of Salama Abu Hashim is a square room, topped by a dome that is heavily influenced by Ottoman architecture. The floor is made from polished stone. Despite being a maqam, it does not have traces of a grave or sanduga unlike most maqams, which are built around the tombs of Muslim holy men and ascetics. A second mihrab is present in the southern wall of the shrine as well.

The structure is in a state of severe dilapidation, with damage being caused to the dome in the early 2000s.

== See also ==
- Salama Abu Hashim
- Salama, Jaffa
- Maqam (shrine)
- List of mosques in Israel
