= Salamé =

Salamé (Arabic: سلامة) is a Lebanese last name which means "peaceable". It derives from a personal first name, and the Semitic word S-L-M meaning "peace". The name has, but is not limited to, alternative spellings such as: Saleme, Salame, Salameh, Salemeh, and Seleme.

Notable people with the surname include:

- Anthony Salame, Australian comedian and radio host
- Ghassan Salamé (born 1951), Lebanese academic and politician
- Jean Salamé, French slalom canoeist
- Joseph Salamé (1914–2004), Lebanese Maronite Catholic archbishop
- Léa Salamé (born 1979), Lebanese-born French journalist, daughter of Ghassan
- Ramzi T. Salamé (born 1953), Lebanese writer and artist
- Toni Salame (born 1963), Lebanese skier

== See also ==
- Salama (disambiguation)
- Salami (disambiguation)
