= Mustafa al-Hallaj =

Palestinian artist (1938-2002)

Mustafa Al-Hallaj
- مصطفى الحلاج
- Born: 1938; Jaffa, British Mandate of Palestine
- Died: 17 December 2002 (aged 63–64); Damascus, Syria
- Occupation: Visual artist
- Known for: Painting, sculpture, printmaking, illustrator, graphic designer

Mustafa al-Hallaj (1938 – 17 December 2002) (Arabic: مصطفى الحلاج) was a Palestinian-born visual artist, primarily working as a graphic designer, painter, and printmaker. Al-Hallaj was a pioneer in the Arab art world, known as an "icon of contemporary Arab graphic arts." His work was often devoted to his lost homeland, Palestine, and he is also said to have tried to turn Palestine into the form and content of his artistic school.

== Biography ==
He was born in Salama in the Jaffa region of Mandatory Palestine. After the 1948 Arab–Israeli War, al-Hallaj and his family sought refuge in Damascus, Beirut, and finally Cairo, where he completed his higher education in 1964. He studied sculpture at the College of Fine Arts in Cairo and attended the Luxor Atelier for Postgraduate Studies. His art included paintings, graphics, murals, illustrations, cover designs and etchings, with specializations in graphic art and sculpture. Al-Hallaj understood sculpture as a medium that needed stability rather than movement, which was a factor of his journey as a refugee, leading him to make the woodblock prints that he would later be known for. He explained that "It was my wanderings that led me to [woodblock] carving. Sculpture requires institutions, stability, and land, and I have none… Sculpture is not suitable for the displaced artist, I think."

After 25 years in Egypt, al-Hallaj travelled to Beirut, which was the centre of "revolutionary and artistic activity". Al-Hallaj contributed to defining the fan al-muqawama (or, "the art of resistance"). He lost 25,000 of his prints in Israeli attacks on Beirut during the 1982 Lebanon War but managed to save the wood and masonry cuts he used to make them. Devastated at the loss of his archive, al-Hallaj moved back to Damascus, and finally resumed his role as a prominent figure within the Palestinian artistic community.

Al-Hallaj was a founding member of the trade union committee of the General Union of Palestinian Writers and Journalists, and a member of the Managing Committee of the General Union of Palestinian Abstract Artists in Syria. He helped lay the foundation for the establishment of an art gallery in Damascus which at its opening in 1987 was dedicated to the memory of Naji al-Ali Damascus.

He remained in Damascus until his death from a tragic fire, in which he suffocated while trying to retrieve his artworks, in 2002.

== Works ==
Al-Hallaj's work is "inspired by ancient Canaanite legends, folk tales, and Palestinian cultural icons, and is a sequence of pictorial narratives that had reached 114 meters at the time of his death, summarizing the history of the Palestinian people from the 11th century BC to the present." Entitled Improvisations of Life, this work is 114 meters long. It portrays visual memories and recollections, and a record of civilization dating back 10000 years – a mix of myth and fertility with the intifada of the Palestinians.

Notable in al-Hallaj's work is his ability to draw, and utilise the dramatic monochromatic (black and white) nature of his prints to his advantage when depicting shapes. Negative space (the space in-between shapes) is used to add texture, pattern and decorative detail to aid the narrative along. In some works, like 'Self-portrait as Man, God, the Devil' linear perspective is utilised, whereas in others, axonometric perspective aids the story of the picture. The stark colour palette, beautifully rendered figures and use of mythologies are emblematic of al-Hallaj's work, making it instantly recognisable.

Al-Hallaj contributed cover illustrations to books published by Ahmad Said Muhammadiya's Dar al-Awda (House of Return), including the 1969 editions of Abd al-Wahhab al-Bayati’s Ash’ar fi al-manfa (Poems in Exile) and Tayeb Salih’s Dumat Wad Hamid (The Doum Tree of Wad Hamid).

Self-portrait as Man, God, the Devil is a Masonite-cut print by al-Hallaj 37 feet (11 m) wide and 9 feet (2.7 m) high in which he represents himself with a long, white beard, a peacock pattern of white hair and enlarged eyes staring in awe at the events depicted. He used it as a way to honour lost comrades; of this work al-Hallaj said "we Palestinian artists are an orchestra. We are one choir… We have many friends and many died. We are a walking graveyard of these personalities who left."

Tex Kerschen calls it

"... a master work, a continuum of fantastic and folkloric imagery that spans ancient and modern times. He juxtaposes a vast and often idiosyncratic menagerie of symbols — bulls, camel men, birds, lizard-like creatures and fish, with fantastic landscapes and episodes of ancient and modern Palestinian life ... Scenes from Al Nakba and the universal history of human oppression, such as mass hangings and forced marches, spill into representations that draw from his extensive erudition and his own syncretic imagination."

Al-Hallaj successfully rescued this work from an electrical fire in his home studio, but he died after running in to save other works. He was buried in the Yarmouk refugee camp in Damascus.

Al-Hallaj has won several local and international awards and prizes.
