= Lebanon at the 2014 Winter Olympics =

- IOC code: LIB
- NOC: Lebanese Olympic Committee
- Website: www.lebolymp.org

in Sochi
- Competitors: 2 in 1 sport
- Flag bearers: Alexandre Mohbat (opening); Jackie Chamoun (closing)
- Medals: Gold 0 Silver 0 Bronze 0 Total 0

Winter Olympics appearances (overview)
- 1948; 1952; 1956; 1960; 1964; 1968; 1972; 1976; 1980; 1984; 1988; 1992; 1994–1998; 2002; 2006; 2010; 2014; 2018; 2022; 2026

Lebanon competed at the 2014 Winter Olympics in Sochi, Russia from 7 to 23 February 2014. Lebanon's team consisted of two athletes in one sport, alpine skiing.

The participation of Jackie Chamoun became controversial in Lebanon after it was revealed at home in 2014 that she had posed in sexy photos for an Austrian calendar in 2011. A ministerial investigation has been mooted, while an online support protest "Strip for Jackie" has been organized. Chamoun has denied that she posed nude publicly on her Facebook page, saying that the behind the scenes images were not for publication.

== Competitors ==
Sport	Men	Women	Total
Alpine skiing	1	1	2
Total	1	1	2

== Alpine skiing ==
According to the final quota allocation released on January 20, 2014, Lebanon had two athletes in qualification position.

Athlete	Event	Run 1		Run 2		Total	
Athlete	Event	Time	Rank	Time	Rank	Time	Rank
Alexandre Mohbat	Men's giant slalom	1:38.96	75	1:38.89	69	3:17.85	69
Alexandre Mohbat	Men's slalom	1:03.77	75	1:18.02	42	2:21.79	42
Jacky Chamoun	Women's slalom	1:16.05	58	1:12.69	48	2:28.74	47
