= Rabih Kayrouz =

Lebanese fashion designer

- Born: 1973 (age 52–53); Lebanon
- Occupation: Fashion designer
- Label: Maison Rabih Kayrouz

Rabih Kayrouz (Arabic: ربيع كيروز; born 1973) is a Lebanese fashion designer, creator and founder of the fashion house Maison Rabih Kayrouz, established in Paris in 2008.

== Early life ==
Rabih Kayrouz was born in Lebanon in 1973. Kayrouz migrated to Paris at the age of 16 to study at the Chambre Syndicale de la Couture Parisienne.

== Career ==
In 1995, after training for several months in the workshops of design houses Dior and Chanel, Kayrouz returned to Beirut where he developed a reputation for designing evening gowns and wedding dresses.

In 2008, Kayrouz returned to Paris to open his own design house at 38, Boulevard Raspail. The location was previously “Le Petit Theatre de Babylone” where Beckett's play Waiting for Godot was performed for the first time. Since 2009, Kayrouz has been a guest designer for the Chambre Syndicale de la Haute Couture, with his seasonal collections included in the bi-annual Paris haute-couture fashion shows. In 2011, Kayrouz was selected by the prominent French ELLE Magazine as one of the “Emerging New Talents”. In 2012 he abandoned the appellation “couture” to focus on ready-to-wear. In the same year, he created a capsule collection for La Redoute (French mail order brand).

== Design signature ==
Kayrouz's design signature has been described as pragmatic, but daring in its use of haute-couture style codes. He has been praised for his use of style “know-how” in creating ready-to-wear collections which complement the urban lifestyle.

== Contribution ==
Kayrouz co-founded in 2008 a non-profit organisation called the Starch Foundation, which helps young Lebanese designers launch and promote their debut collections.
