= Salamina =

Salamina (from the Greek name Salamis) may refer to:

Italian name of places and jurisdictions in Greece

- Salamis Island, an Aegean island near Athens
- Salamina (city), a port town on Salamis Island
- Salamis, Cyprus, also named Constantia, former seat of a Metropolitan archbishopric, now double (Latin Catholic and Cypriot Orthodox) titular see

Other places and jurisdictions

- Salamina, Caldas, a town and municipality in the Caldas Department, Colombia
- Salamina, Magdalena, a town and municipality in the Magdalena Department, Colombia

Other uses

- Salamina, a memoir by Rockwell Kent about his first arctic winter in Illorsuit, Greenland.
