= Lebanon at the 1968 Winter Olympics =

- IOC code: LIB
- NOC: Lebanese Olympic Committee
- Website: www.lebolymp.org

in Grenoble
- Competitors: 3 (men) in 1 sport
- Medals: Gold 0 Silver 0 Bronze 0 Total 0

Winter Olympics appearances (overview)
- 1948; 1952; 1956; 1960; 1964; 1968; 1972; 1976; 1980; 1984; 1988; 1992; 1994–1998; 2002; 2006; 2010; 2014; 2018; 2022; 2026; 2030

Lebanon competed at the 1968 Winter Olympics in Grenoble, France.

== Alpine skiing ==
Men

Athlete	Event	Race 1		Race 2		Total	
Athlete	Event	Time	Rank	Time	Rank	Time	Rank
Ghassan Keyrouz	Giant Slalom	2:22.43	87	2:24.76	87	4:47.19	85
Moussa Jaalouk	Giant Slalom	2:15.54	83	2:17.89	81	4:33.43	80
Nagib Barrak	Giant Slalom	2:14.84	82	2:24.06	86	4:38.90	81

Men's slalom

Athlete	Heat 1		Heat 2		Final					
Athlete	Time	Rank	Time	Rank	Time 1	Rank	Time 2	Rank	Total	Rank
Ghassan Keyrouz	DSQ	–	1:18.11	4	did not advance					
Nagib Barrak	1:07.13	5	1:25.73	4	did not advance					
Moussa Jaalouk	1:13.69	5	1:09.06	3	did not advance					
