= Lebanon at the 2022 Winter Olympics =

- Flag of Lebanon
- IOC code: LBN
- NOC: Lebanese Olympic Committee
- Website: www.lebolymp.org

in Beijing, China 4–20 February 2022
- Competitors: 3 (2 men and 1 woman) in 2 sports
- Flag bearers (opening): Cesar Arnouk; Manon Ouaiss
- Flag bearer (closing): Volunteer
- Medals: Gold 0 Silver 0 Bronze 0 Total 0

Winter Olympics appearances (overview)
- 1948; 1952; 1956; 1960; 1964; 1968; 1972; 1976; 1980; 1984; 1988; 1992; 1994–1998; 2002; 2006; 2010; 2014; 2018; 2022; 2026; 2030

Lebanon competed at the 2022 Winter Olympics in Beijing, China, from 4 to 20 February 2022.

The Lebanese delegation consisted of three athletes (two men and one woman) competing in two sports. Cesar Arnouk and Manon Ouaiss were the country's flagbearer during the opening ceremony. Meanwhile, a volunteer was the flagbearer during the closing ceremony.

== Competitors ==
The following is the list of number of competitors participating at the Games per sport/discipline.

Sport	Men	Women	Total
Alpine skiing	1	1	2
Cross-country skiing	1	0	1
Total	2	1	3

== Alpine skiing ==
By meeting the basic qualification standards Lebanon qualified one male and one female alpine skier.

Athlete	Event	Run 1		Run 2		Total	
Athlete	Event	Time	Rank	Time	Rank	Time	Rank
Cesar Arnouk	Men's giant slalom	DNF		Did not advance			
Cesar Arnouk	Men's slalom	1:07.05	47	58.37	34	2:05.42	38
Manon Ouaiss	Women's giant slalom	1:08.88	54	DNF			
Manon Ouaiss	Women's slalom	1:02.69	52	1:02.96	46	2:05.65	46

== Cross-country skiing ==
By meeting the basic qualification standards Lebanon qualified one male cross-country skier.

Distance

Athlete	Event	Final		
Athlete	Event	Time	Deficit	Rank
Elie Tawk	Men's 15 km classical	51:46.5	+13:51.7	92

Sprint

Athlete	Event	Qualification		Quarterfinal		Semifinal		Final	
Athlete	Event	Time	Rank	Time	Rank	Time	Rank	Time	Rank
Elie Tawk	Men's	3:47.73	87	Did not advance					
