= Dany Abounaoum =

Lebanese alpine skier (born 1969)

Personal information
- Nationality: Lebanese
- Born: 23 October 1969 (age 55)

Sport
- Sport: Alpine skiing

Dany Abounaoum (born 23 October 1969) is a Lebanese alpine skier. He competed in the 1992 Winter Olympics.
