= Sami Rebez =

Lebanese alpine skier (born 1960)

Personal information
- Nationality: Lebanese
- Born: 12 September 1960 (age 64)

Sport
- Sport: Alpine skiing

Sami Rebez (born 12 September 1960) is a Lebanese alpine skier. He competed in two events at the 1980 Winter Olympics.
