= Salamah, Saudi Arabia =

Salamah
- Village
- Location in Saudi Arabia
- Coordinates: 16°58′31″N 42°45′23″E
- Country: Saudi Arabia
- Province: Jizan Province
- Time zone: UTC+3 (EAT)
  - Summer (DST): UTC+3 (EAT)

Salamah is a village in Jizan Province, in southwestern Saudi Arabia.

== See also ==
- List of cities and towns in Saudi Arabia
- Regions of Saudi Arabia
