= Salamis =

Salamis may refer to:

== Places and battles ==
- Salamis Island in the Saronic Gulf of the Aegean Sea, near Athens, Greece
  - Salamina (city), former municipality on Salamis Island
  - Salamis Naval Base, a Greek naval base on Salamis Island
  - Battle of Salamis, 480 BC, between allied Greeks and Achaemenid Persian empire
- Salamis, Cyprus or Constantia, an ancient city in Cyprus
  - Battle of Salamis in Cyprus (450 BC), between Athenians and Persians
  - Battle of Salamis (306 BC), between Ptolemy I and Demetrius
- Salamis (ruin), site in Northern Israel that had formerly been a fortress

== Other uses ==
- Greek battleship Salamis, a dreadnought ordered in 1912
- Salamis (mythology), a nymph in Greek mythology
- Salamis (butterfly), a genus in the family Nymphalidae
- Salamis (novel), a 2020 book by Harry Turtledove
- Salamis Tablet, a counting board (300 BC) discovered on Salamis Island

== See also ==
- Salami, a type of cured sausage
- Salamina (disambiguation)
