= Salameh-ye Vosta =

Salameh-ye Vosta سلامه وسطي
- Village
- Location within Iran
- Coordinates: 30°26′03″N 50°01′49″E
- Country: Iran
- Province: Khuzestan
- County: Behbahan
- Bakhsh: Zeydun
- Rural District: Dorunak

Population (2006)
  - Total: 228
- Time zone: UTC+3:30 (IRST)
  - Summer (DST): UTC+4:30 (IRDT)

Salameh-ye Vosta (Persian: سلامه وسطي, also Romanized as Salāmeh-ye Vosţá, and Salāmeh-ye Vostá; also known as Salāmeh-ye Mīānī) is a village in Dorunak Rural District, Zeydun District, Behbahan County, Khuzestan Province, Iran. At the 2006 census, its population was 228, in 53 families.
