= Naji Heneine =

Lebanese alpine skier (born 1961)

Personal information
- Nationality: Lebanese
- Born: 22 July 1961 (age 63)

Sport
- Sport: Alpine skiing

Naji Heneine (born 22 July 1961) is a Lebanese alpine skier. He competed in two events at the 1980 Winter Olympics.
