= Seleme =

Seleme is a surnam. Notable people with the surname include:

- Antonio Seleme (1904–1979), Bolivian military leader and Minister of Government under Hugo Ballivián who supported a coup
- Hugo Omar Seleme (born 1968), Argentinean political philosopher and professor
- Jaime Humérez Seleme, Bolivian politician, leader in Social Christian Party (Bolivia), Minister of Press in the Government of Celso Torrelio Villa, 1981–1982

== See also ==
- Salamé
- Selene (disambiguation)
- Semele (disambiguation)
- Seleme, a track on the album Yasteseryal Edition 2 by Ethiopian singer Teddy Afro
