= Salami, Ramhormoz =

Coordinates: 30.6169°N 48.6334°E

Salami سالمي
- Village
- Interactive map of Salami
- Country: Iran
- Province: Khuzestan
- County: Ramhormoz
- Bakhsh: Central
- Rural District: Howmeh-ye Sharqi

Population (2006)
  - Total: 78
- Time zone: UTC+3:30 (IRST)
  - Summer (DST): UTC+4:30 (IRDT)

Salami (Persian: سالمي, also Romanized as Sālamī) is a village in Howmeh-ye Sharqi Rural District, in the Central District of Ramhormoz County, Khuzestan Province, Iran. At the 2006 census, its population was 78, in 12 families.
