= Karim Sabbagh =

Lebanese alpine skier (born 1961)

Personal information
- Nationality: Lebanese
- Born: 26 September 1963 (age 63)

Sport
- Sport: Alpine skiing

Karim Sabbagh (born 16 November 1961) is a Lebanese alpine skier. He competed in two events at the 1988 Winter Olympics.
