= Jean Khalil =

Lebanese alpine skier (born 1969)

Personal information
- Nationality: Lebanese
- Born: 19 August 1969 (age 55)

Sport
- Sport: Alpine skiing

Jean Khalil (born 19 August 1969) is a Lebanese alpine skier. He competed in two events at the 1992 Winter Olympics.
