= Ghassan Gedeon-Achi =

Lebanese alpine skier (born 1993)

Ghassan Gedeon-Achi (born July 28, 1993) is an alpine skier from Lebanon, who now competes for Canada. He competed in the 2010 Winter Olympics. He raced in the Giant Slalom and Slalom. Ghassan was not ranked in both competitions (disqualified DSQ or did not finish DNF). Ghassan attended Middlebury College in Middlebury, Vermont, where he competed on the NCAA circuit in Alpine skiing.

After getting his Canadian citizenship, Ghassan Gedeon-Achi decided to ski under the Canadian flag.

.
