= Lebanon at the 1972 Winter Olympics =

- IOC code: LIB
- NOC: Lebanese Olympic Committee
- Website: www.lebolymp.org

in Sapporo
- Competitors: 1 (man) in 1 sport
- Medals: Gold 0 Silver 0 Bronze 0 Total 0

Winter Olympics appearances (overview)
- 1948; 1952; 1956; 1960; 1964; 1968; 1972; 1976; 1980; 1984; 1988; 1992; 1994–1998; 2002; 2006; 2010; 2014; 2018; 2022; 2026

Lebanon competed at the 1972 Winter Olympics in Sapporo, Japan, which were held from 2 February to 13 February 1972. This marked Lebanon's seventh appearance in a Winter Games since their debut in 1948. The delegation consisted of a single male alpine skier, Ghassan Keyrouz, who competed in two events. His best finish was 45th in the giant slalom event, thus failing to win a medal.

== Background ==
The Lebanese Olympic Committee was founded in 1946 and officially recognised by the International Olympic Committee on 22 November 1947. A few months later, the nation made its debut in the 1948 Winter Olympics in St. Moritz, Switzerland. Up to this point, Lebanon had not missed a Games except for the 1956 Summer Olympics in Melbourne, Australia, which they boycotted along with Egypt and Iraq in protest of the Suez Crisis.

The 1972 Winter Olympics were held in Sapporo, Japan, from 2 to 13 February 1972. The Games in Sapporo hosted 1,006 athletes in 35 events from 35 different nations. Lebanon's participation marked their seventh consecutive appearance in a Winter Games.

Lebanon sent a single athlete for these Games, 20-year old alpine skier Ghassan Keyrouz, returning after appearing in the previous 1968 Winter Olympics. In addition, Lebanon sent Michel Samen to serve as an official in the jury of the men's giant slalom event, along with two other officials, bringing their delegation to a total of four members.

== Alpine skiing ==
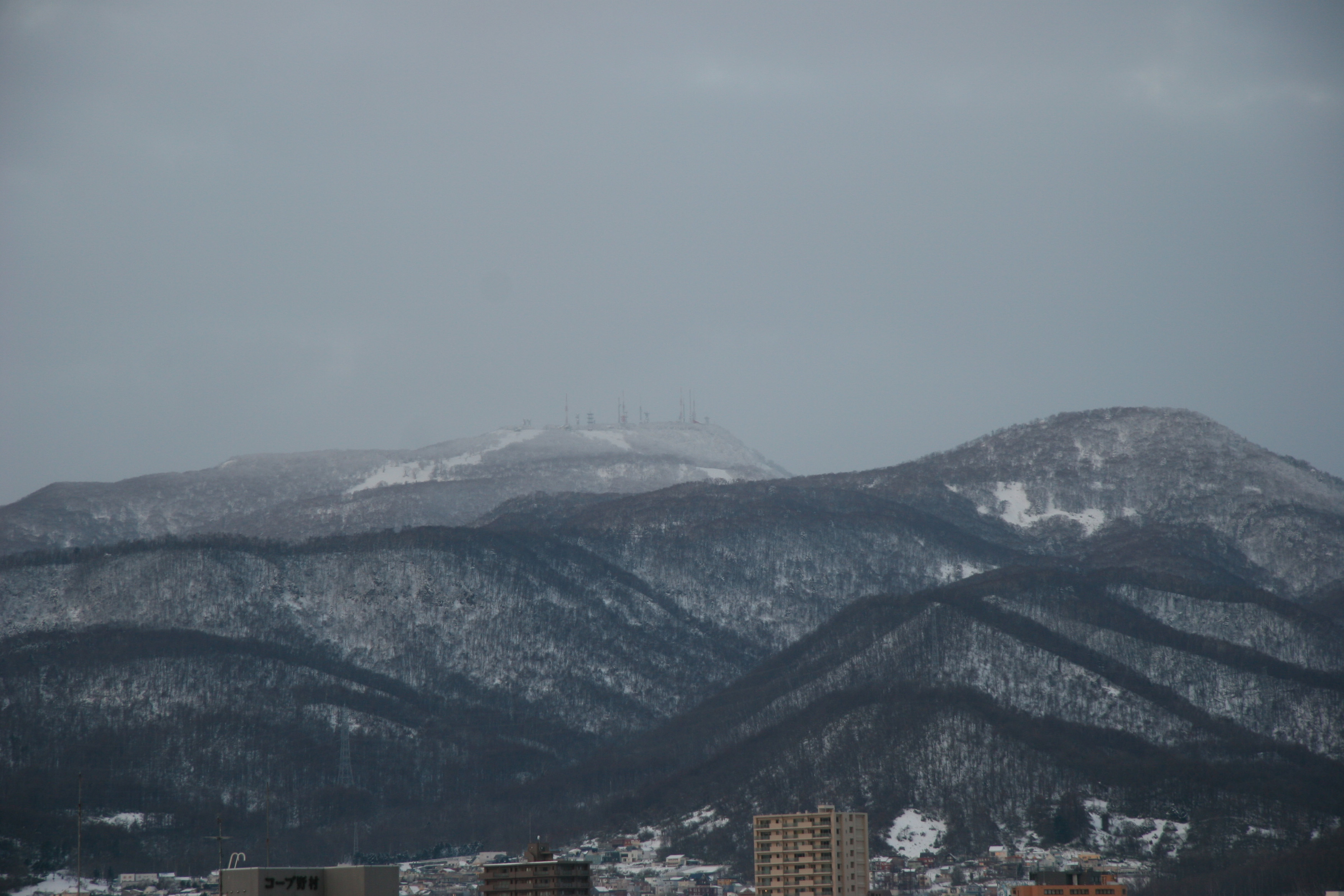
The slalom events took place on Mount Teine in Sapporo

Ghassan Keyrouz represented the nation in two alpine skiing events: the men's giant slalom event and the men's slalom event. In the first run of the giant slalom on 9 February, Keyrouz posted a time of 2 minutes, 5 seconds, ranking 53rd in the field. The following day, he skied with a time of 2 minutes, 11 seconds. With a total time of 4 minutes, 16 seconds, Keyrouz finished 45th in a field of 48, 1 minute and 7 seconds behind gold-medal winner Gustav Thöni of Italy. On 12 February, Keyrouz placed 6th in Group E of the classification round after posting a total time of 2 minutes, 10 seconds, after two runs. The following day, Keyrouz posted a did not finish in the final of the slalom event.

Men

Athlete	Event	Race 1		Race 2		Total	
Athlete	Event	Time	Rank	Time	Rank	Time	Rank
Ghassan Keyrouz	Giant slalom	2:05.10	54	2:11.20	45	4:16.30	45

Men's slalom

Athlete	Classification		Final					
Athlete	Time	Rank	Time 1	Rank	Time 2	Rank	Total	Rank
Ghassan Keyrouz	2:10.04	6	DNF	–	–	–	DNF	–
