= Pierre Succar =

Lebanese alpine skier (born 1960)

Personal information
- Nationality: Lebanese
- Born: 15 June 1960 (age 66)

Sport
- Sport: Alpine skiing

Pierre Succar (born 15 June 1960) is a Lebanese alpine skier. He competed in two events at the 1988 Winter Olympics.
