= Salami (surname) =

Salami is a surname. Notable people with the surname include:

- Adebayo Salami (1951–2021), Nigerian politician
- Adigun Salami (born 1988), Nigerian footballer
- Eugène Salami (born 1989), Nigerian footballer
- Gbolahan Salami (born 1991), Nigerian footballer
- Hossein Salami (1960–2025), Iranian major general and commander-in-chief of the Islamic Revolutionary Guard Corps
- Khadija al-Salami (born 1966), Yemeni female film producer
- Minna Salami (born 1978), Finnish-Nigerian journalist
- Zul Kifl Salami, Beninese economist and politician
