= Lebanon at the Olympics =

- IOC code: LBN
- NOC: Lebanese Olympic Committee
- Website: www.lebolymp.org
- Medals Ranked 123rd: Gold 0 Silver 2 Bronze 2 Total 4

Summer appearances
- 1948; 1952; 1956; 1960; 1964; 1968; 1972; 1976; 1980; 1984; 1988; 1992; 1996; 2000; 2004; 2008; 2012; 2016; 2020; 2024

Winter appearances
- 1948; 1952; 1956; 1960; 1964; 1968; 1972; 1976; 1980; 1984; 1988; 1992; 1994–1998; 2002; 2006; 2010; 2014; 2018; 2022; 2026

The Lebanese Olympic Committee was formed in 1947 and recognized by the International Olympic Committee in 1948. Lebanon participated at the inaugural Olympic Games in 1948, and has competed in all but one Summer Olympic Games since then. Lebanon boycotted the 1956 Games in protest of the British and French involvement in the Suez Crisis. Lebanon has participated in most Winter Olympic Games since 1948, missing only the 1994 and 1998 Winter Games.

Lebanon made an appearance at the Olympics in 1936, without participating, when a "delegation of officials" attended the Summer Olympics in Berlin.

Lebanese athletes have won four medals, three in Greco-Roman wrestling and one in weightlifting.

In 2010, Lebanon participated at the first Youth Olympic Games in Singapore.

== Medal tables ==
=== Medals by Summer Games ===
Games	Athletes	Gold	Silver	Bronze	Total	Rank
1948 London	8	0	0	0	0	–
1952 Helsinki	9	0	1	1	2	32
1956 Melbourne	did not participate					
1960 Rome	19	0	0	0	0	–
1964 Tokyo	5	0	0	0	0	–
1968 Mexico City	3	0	0	0	0	–
1972 Munich	19	0	1	0	1	33
1976 Montreal	3	0	0	0	0	–
1980 Moscow	15	0	0	1	1	35
1984 Los Angeles	22	0	0	0	0	–
1988 Seoul	21	0	0	0	0	–
1992 Barcelona	12	0	0	0	0	–
1996 Atlanta	1	0	0	0	0	–
2000 Sydney	5	0	0	0	0	–
2004 Athens	5	0	0	0	0	–
2008 Beijing	6	0	0	0	0	–
2012 London	10	0	0	0	0	–
2016 Rio de Janeiro	9	0	0	0	0	–
2020 Tokyo	6	0	0	0	0	–
2024 Paris	10	0	0	0	0	–
2028 Los Angeles	future event					
2032 Brisbane	future event					
Total		0	2	2	4	123

=== Medals by Winter Games ===
Games	Athletes	Gold	Silver	Bronze	Total	Rank
1948 St. Moritz	2	0	0	0	0	–
1952 Oslo	1	0	0	0	0	–
1956 Cortina d'Ampezzo	3	0	0	0	0	–
1960 Squaw Valley	2	0	0	0	0	–
1964 Innsbruck	4	0	0	0	0	–
1968 Grenoble	3	0	0	0	0	–
1972 Sapporo	1	0	0	0	0	–
1976 Innsbruck	1	0	0	0	0	–
1980 Lake Placid	3	0	0	0	0	–
1984 Sarajevo	4	0	0	0	0	–
1988 Calgary	4	0	0	0	0	–
1992 Albertville	4	0	0	0	0	–
1994 Lillehammer	did not participate					
1998 Nagano	did not participate					
2002 Salt Lake City	2	0	0	0	0	–
2006 Turin	3	0	0	0	0	–
2010 Vancouver	3	0	0	0	0	–
2014 Sochi	2	0	0	0	0	–
2018 Pyeongchang	3	0	0	0	0	–
2022 Beijing	3	0	0	0	0	–
2026 Milano Cortina	2	0	0	0	0	–
2030 French Alps	future event					
2034 Utah	future event					
Total		0	0	0	0	–

=== Medals by summer sport ===
Sport	Gold	Silver	Bronze	Total
Wrestling	0	1	2	3
Weightlifting	0	1	0	1
Totals (2 entries)	0	2	2	4

== Medalists ==
Medal	Name	Games	Sport	Event
Silver	Zakaria Chihab	1952 Helsinki	Wrestling	Men's Greco-Roman bantamweight
Bronze	Khalil Taha	1952 Helsinki	Wrestling	Men's Greco-Roman welterweight
Silver	Mohamed Traboulsi	1972 Munich	Weightlifting	Men's 75 kg
Bronze	Hassan Bechara	1980 Moscow	Wrestling	Men's Greco-Roman +100 kg

== See also ==
- List of flag bearers for Lebanon at the Olympics
- Sport in Lebanon
