= Toni Salame =

Lebanese alpine skier (born 1963)

Personal information
- Nationality: Lebanese
- Born: 11 July 1963 (age 63)

Sport
- Sport: Alpine skiing

Toni Salame (born 11 July 1963) is a Lebanese alpine skier. He competed in two events at the 1988 Winter Olympics.
