= Raymond Kayrouz =

Lebanese alpine skier (born 1970)

Raymond Kayrouz FIS id: 340010
Personal information
- Nationality: Lebanon
- Born: March 28, 1970 (age 56)

Sport
- Sport: Skiing

Raymond Kayrouz (Arabic: ريمون كيروز; born 28 March 1970) is an alpine skier representing Lebanon. At the 1992 Winter Olympics, he represented Lebanon in the giant slalom and slalom events.

At the 1992 Winter Olympics giant slalom, El-Hassan Mahta of Morocco, who started 129th in the first run, was passed by the subsequent competitor, Kayrouz, who started 130th, though both were disqualified for missing gates. Mahta had started in the 40-second interval before Kayrouz, and this has been noted as one of the worst performances at the Olympics. This performance, amongst others, contributed to the establishment of minimum standards of competency and performance for the 1994 Winter Olympics, which ultimately led to Kayrouz not being able qualify for the Olympics. Even with the establishment of qualification standards, it is still possible to be passed on the piste in giant slalom.

At the 1992 Winter Olympics slalom, Kayrouz failed to finish the course in the first run.
