= Elias Majdalani =

Lebanese alpine skier (born 1966)

Personal information
- Nationality: Lebanese
- Born: 12 June 1966 (age 60)

Sport
- Sport: Alpine skiing

Elias Majdalani (born 12 June 1966) is a Lebanese alpine skier skier. He competed at the 1988 Winter Olympics and the 1992 Winter Olympics.
