= Farida Rahmeh =

Lebanese alpine skier (born 1953)

Personal information
- Nationality: Lebanese
- Born: 22 September 1953 (age 71)

Sport
- Sport: Alpine skiing

Farida Rahmeh (born 22 September 1953) is a Lebanese alpine skier. She competed at the 1976 Winter Olympics and the 1980 Winter Olympics.
