= Salama, Jaffa =

Salama سلمة Selmeh
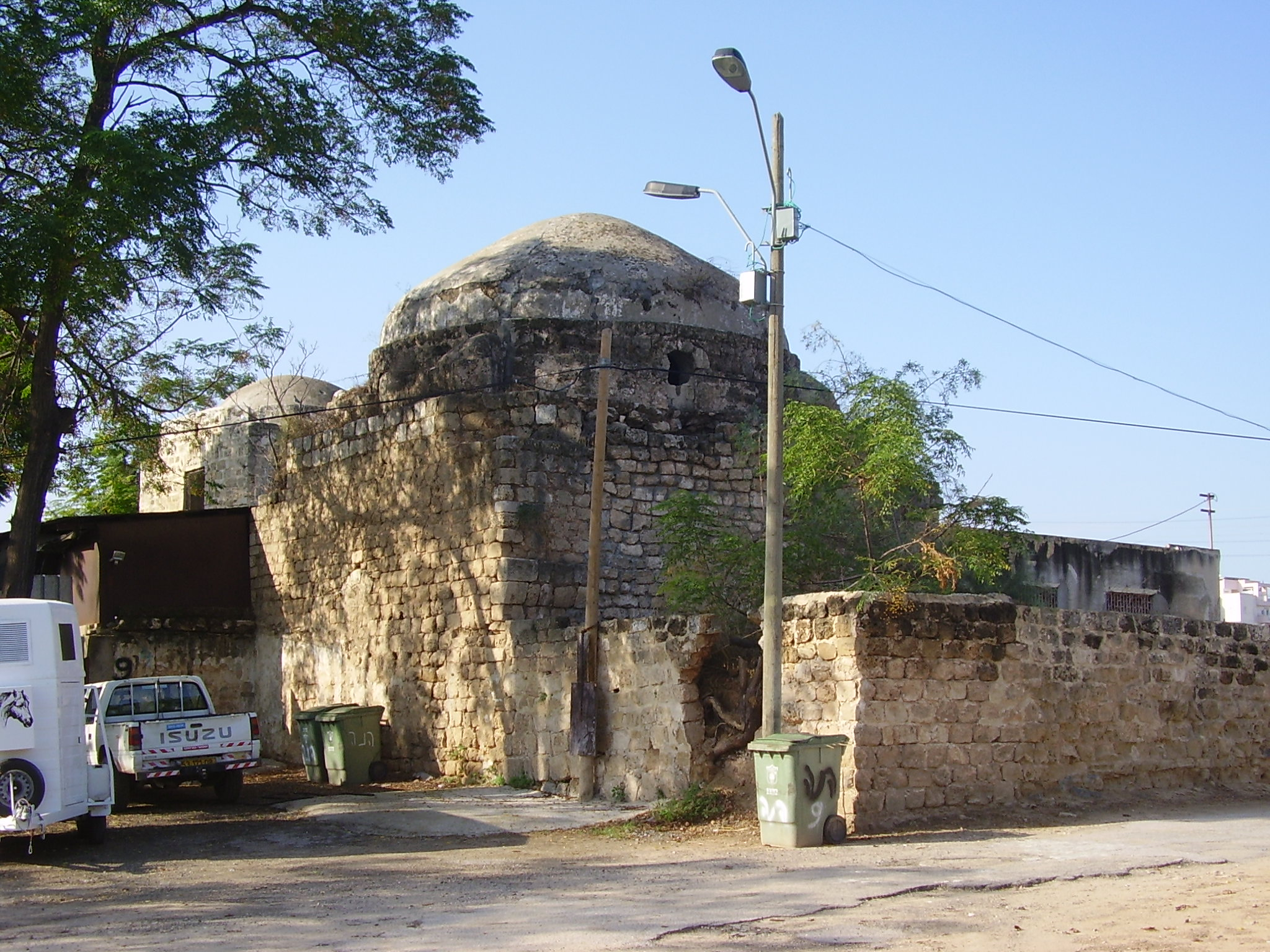
- The Sidna Salama Mosque in Salama.

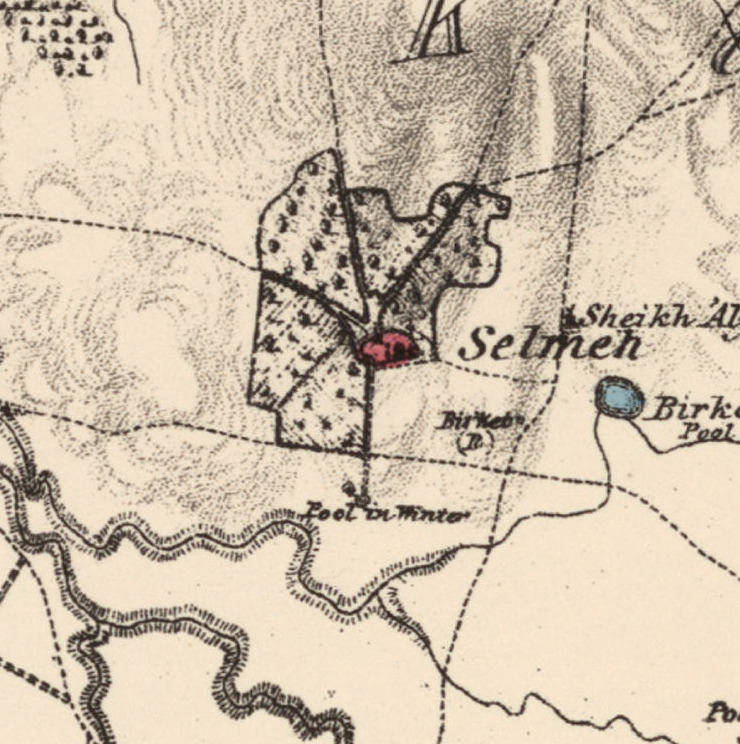
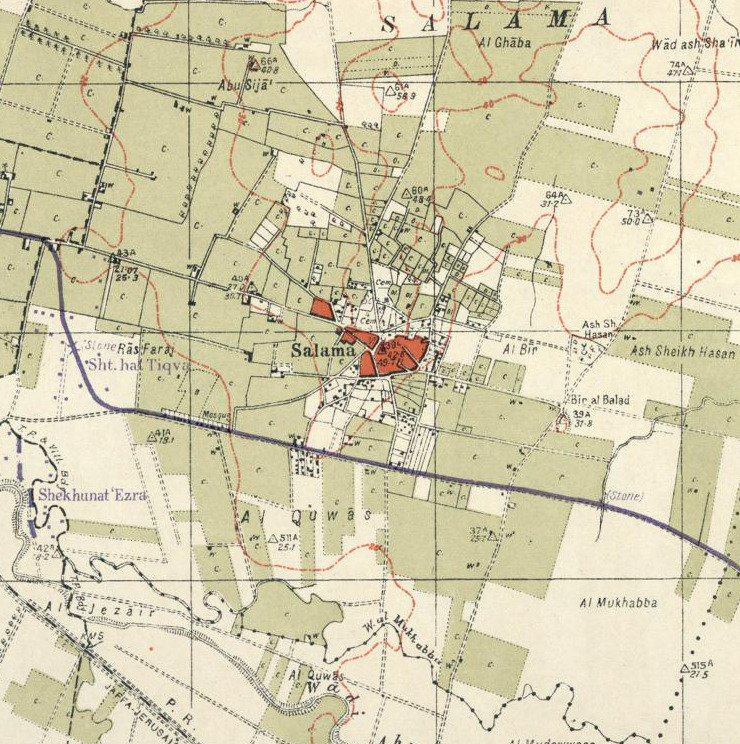
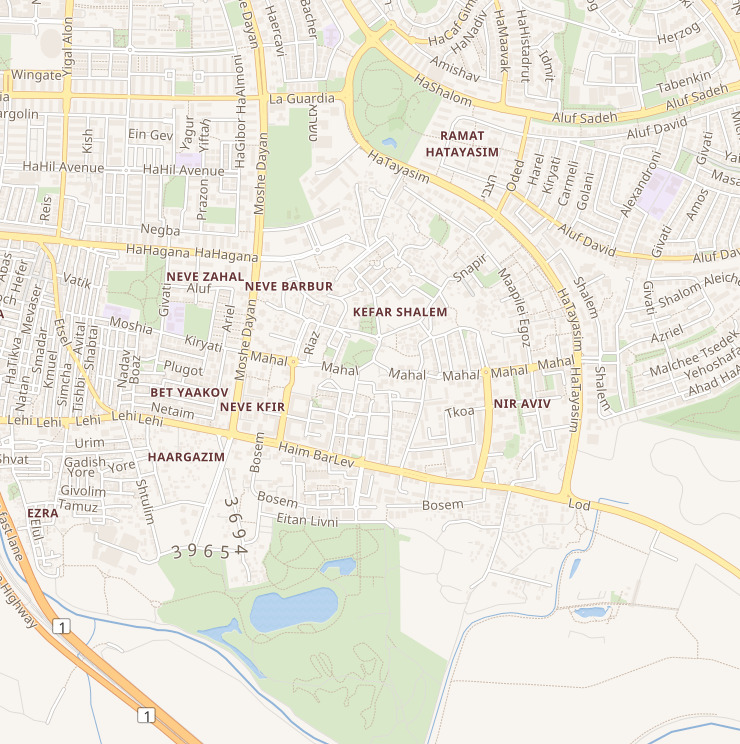
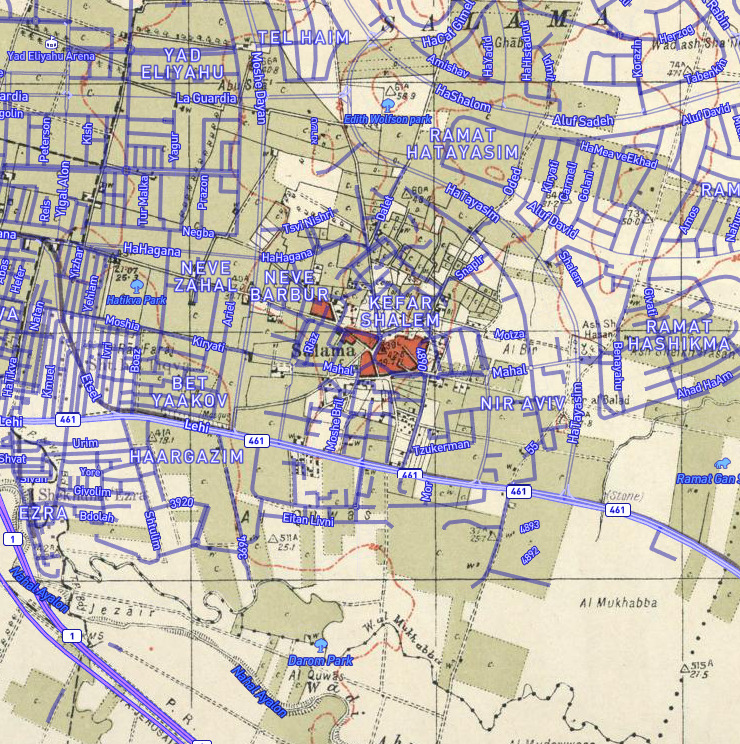
- 1870s map 1940s map modern map 1940s with modern overlay map A series of historical maps of the area around Salama, Jaffa (click the buttons)

- Location within Mandatory Palestine
- Coordinates: 32°02′57″N 34°48′18″E
- Palestine grid: 131/161
- Geopolitical entity: Mandatory Palestine
- Subdistrict: Jaffa
- Date of depopulation: 25 April 1948

Area
  - Total: 6,782 dunams (6.782 km^{2}; 2.619 sq mi)

Population (1945)
  - Total: 6,730
- Cause(s) of depopulation: Military assault by Yishuv forces
- Current Localities: Tel Aviv

Salamah (Arabic: سلمة) was a Palestinian Arab town located five kilometers east of Jaffa, that was depopulated in the lead-up to the 1948 Arab-Israeli War. The town contained the reputed grave of Salama Abu Hashim, a companion of the prophet Muhammad. His tomb, two schools, and several houses are among the few surviving structures of the former settlement.

== Etymology ==
Local tradition ascribes the name to Salama Abu Hashim. According to modern toponymic analysis, Salamah originally derives from the Semitic root Š-L-M “to yield, pay,” combined with the Aramaic suffix -ā.

The historic road from Jaffa to the village is today preserved as Salameh Road on the border of Tel Aviv and Jaffa.

== History ==
=== Ottoman era ===
In 1596, under Ottoman rule, Salamah was a village in the nahiya of Ramla (liwa of Gaza), with a population of 17 Muslim households, an estimated 94 persons. They paid a fixed tax-rate of 25% on agricultural products, including wheat and barley, as well as on livestock and beehives, amounting to 1,000 Akçe.

An Ottoman village list of about 1870 showed that Salama had 73 houses and a population of 216 (men only). In 1882 the PEF's Survey of Western Palestine described the village as built of adobe brick, with gardens and wells.

=== Religious and cultural sites ===
The central mosque of Salama and the domed shrine of Salama Abu Hashim were reconstructed in 1810 CE by Muhammad Abu Nabbut, governor of Jaffa. A second mosque, the "Afghan Mosque," was built in 1927 by members of the Afghan community resident in the village. Oral tradition also records additional mosques and several shrines (maqāms), among them those dedicated to Shaykh Ḥasan, Shaykh Muwannis, and Naʿīm ibn ʿAbdallāh al-Naḥḥām.

=== British Mandate era ===
In the 1922 census of Palestine Salameh had a population of 1,187, all Muslims, rising to 3,691 in the 1931 census, in 800 houses.

Education expanded during the Mandate: the government boys’ school, opened in 1920, enrolling 880 students by 1941, while the girls’ school established in 1936 counted 250 pupils. Additional schools, such as those of Shaykh Murshid Saʿadeh and Shaykh Ahmad al-Ṭībī, were founded through local patronage. Many pupils pursued secondary studies in Jaffa, particularly at the prestigious ʿUmariyya School.

By the 1940s, Salama had developed into a semi-urban economic hub. Fertile lands supported citrus, bananas, vegetables, and cereals, while enterprises included weaving factories, dairies, flour mills, and a juice and soda plant. Cooperative ventures such as the Salama Supply and Trade Co. and the Salama Land Investment Co. reflected its integration into regional markets. Cafés and clubs functioned as centers of political and social life, hosting gatherings for groups like the Muslim Brotherhood and Najjada youth movement.

In the 1945 statistics the population had increased to 6,730, of whom 60 were Christians and 6,670 Muslims. The total land area was 6,782 dunams, of which 3,248 were citrus and bananas, 684 for plantations and irrigable land, and 2,406 for cereals; 114 dunams were built-up areas. Local records also note the sale of approximately 885 dunams to Jewish buyers before 1948.

=== 1936–39 revolt ===
Salama played a prominent role in the 1936–39 revolt against British rule. Local fighters joined wider rebel networks, and several villagers were executed at Acre prison for their involvement.

=== 1948 war ===
On 4 December 1947 a band of 120–150 gunmen from Salame attacked nearby Ef'al, but were repelled. On 8 December, residents of Salama took part in attacks on Tel Aviv’s Hatikva neighborhood.

In January–February 1948, Palmach troops destroyed houses in Yazur and Salama. In the final week of April 1948, the Haganah launched Operation Hametz to capture villages east of Jaffa. Salama was occupied between 28–30 April without resistance; most inhabitants had fled after internal debates between leaders over whether to fight or evacuate. Contemporary reports noted that around 12,000 residents departed through an escape corridor left open by Jewish forces.

Settlement of the depopulated village with Jewish war refugees and Zionist immigrants began two weeks later. On 10 December 1948, Salama and parts of its land were annexed to Tel Aviv. The site today forms the neighborhood of Kfar Shalem.

=== Families and genealogy ===
Salama's population was composed of several large clans (hamūlāt), among them the Abu ʿAsba, Abu Farda, Abu Libdeh, Abu Ghazaleh, Abu Kishk, al-Masri, and al-Tabari families. Oral traditions collected from village elders by village historian Nizar Abu 'Asba describe the Abu ʿAsba as the largest lineage, tracing descent from Arab tribes that migrated into the Jaffa district in the Ottoman period. Other families maintained ties of marriage and commerce with neighboring villages such as Yazur, Kafr ʿAna, and al-ʿAbbasiya, reflecting Salama’s integration into the wider Jaffa hinterland.

Several families were known for their specialized occupations: the Abu Libdeh as landowners and merchants, the Abu Ghazaleh as textile producers, and the Abu Farda as custodians of religious shrines and oral memory. During the Mandate period, many villagers invested in citrus agriculture and urban businesses, creating intergenerational wealth and strong ties to Jaffa’s markets.

=== Oral traditions and cultural memory ===
Oral histories preserved by former residents emphasize the centrality of Salama Abu Hashim’s shrine, which was visited for blessings and vows (ziyāra). Elders also recalled annual festivals (mawāsīm) in the orchards, folk dances, and the performance of traditional songs such as ʿatābā and mījanā, which accompanied weddings and collective work in the fields. The village’s cafés, including those owned by the Abu Libdeh and al-Masri families, became meeting places for political debates, storytelling, and performances by itinerant poets.

Oral accounts describe Salama as a place of relative prosperity on the eve of 1948, with paved streets, shops, and cultural clubs. Former inhabitants have preserved detailed recollections of daily life, agricultural routines, and kinship ties, which now serve as part of the collective memory of the Palestinian diaspora.

=== Notable figures ===
Several individuals from Salama became prominent in local and national life. During the 1936–39 revolt, ʿAbd al-Qādir Abu ʿAsba and his cousin Muḥammad Abu Libdeh were noted as local commanders, both executed by the British in Acre prison for their participation in armed resistance. Shaykh Ḥasan Abu Farda, custodian of the shrine of Salama Abu Hashim, was remembered as a religious authority and mediator in village disputes.

Other figures gained regional significance during the Mandate: ʿAlī Abu Ghazāleh, owner of a weaving factory, was active in the Jaffa Citrus Growers’ Association, while Khalīl Abu ʿAsba co-founded the Salama Supply and Trade Company in 1934. In the cultural sphere, the painter and printmaker Mustafa al-Hallaj (1938–2002), later based in Damascus, was born in Salama and became one of the leading Palestinian graphic artists of the twentieth century.

Modern descendants of the residents include numerous doctors, engineers, politicians, educators and businesspersons. Among local educators, historian Nizar Ahmad Abu Asba is notable for his 740 page volume about village history quoted in this article.

== See also ==
- Mustafa al-Hallaj
- Kafr 'Ana
- Depopulated Palestinian locations in Israel
- List of villages depopulated during the Arab–Israeli conflict
- Mount Hope (1853–1858), a nearby farm attacked by residents of Salama

== Bibliography ==
- Abu ʿAsba, Nizār Aḥmad (2025). al-Bawāsil: Ḥikāyat Basālat Ahlī Balda Salama, Qaḍāʾ Yāfā [البواسل: حكاية بسالة أهالي بلدة سلمة قضاء يافا]. Amman: Author. (Legal deposit no. 2020/5/1497, Jordanian National Library).
- Barron, J.B. (1923). Palestine: Report and General Abstracts of the Census of 1922. Jerusalem: Government of Palestine.
- Conder, C.R.; Kitchener, H.H. (1882). The Survey of Western Palestine, vol. 2. London: Palestine Exploration Fund.
- Government of Palestine, Department of Statistics (1945). Village Statistics, April, 1945.
- Hadawi, S. (1970). Village Statistics of 1945: A Classification of Land and Area Ownership in Palestine. Palestine Liberation Organization Research Center.
- Hartmann, M. (1883). Die Ortschaftenliste des Liwa Jerusalem.... Zeitschrift des Deutschen Palästina-Vereins, 6:102–149.
- Hütteroth, W.-D.; Abdulfattah, K. (1977). Historical Geography of Palestine, Transjordan and Southern Syria in the Late 16th Century. Erlangen.
- Khalidi, W. (1992). All That Remains: The Palestinian Villages Occupied and Depopulated by Israel in 1948. Washington D.C.: Institute for Palestine Studies.
- Mills, E. (1932). Census of Palestine 1931. Jerusalem: Government of Palestine.
- Morris, B. (2004). The Birth of the Palestinian Refugee Problem Revisited. Cambridge: Cambridge University Press.
- Morris, B. (2008). 1948: A History of the First Arab–Israeli War. Yale University Press.
- Naor, M. (2013). Social Mobilization in the Arab/Israeli War of 1948. London: Routledge.
- Socin, A. (1879). Alphabetisches Verzeichniss von Ortschaften des Paschalik Jerusalem. Zeitschrift des Deutschen Palästina-Vereins, 2:135–163.
