= Salama Abu Hashim =

One of the companions of Muhammad

Salama Abū Hāshim (Arabic: سلمة أبو هاشم) or Salma Abu Hashim, was one of the companions of Muhammad.

Salama a village near Jaffa is reportedly named after him. Salameh Street, now on the border of Tel Aviv and Jaffa is consequently named after the historic village.
