= Edward Samen =

Lebanese alpine skier

Personal information
- Nationality: Lebanese

Sport
- Sport: Alpine skiing

Edward Samen is a Lebanese alpine skier. He competed in two events at the 1984 Winter Olympics.
