= Samer Tawk =

Lebanese cross-country skier (born 1998)

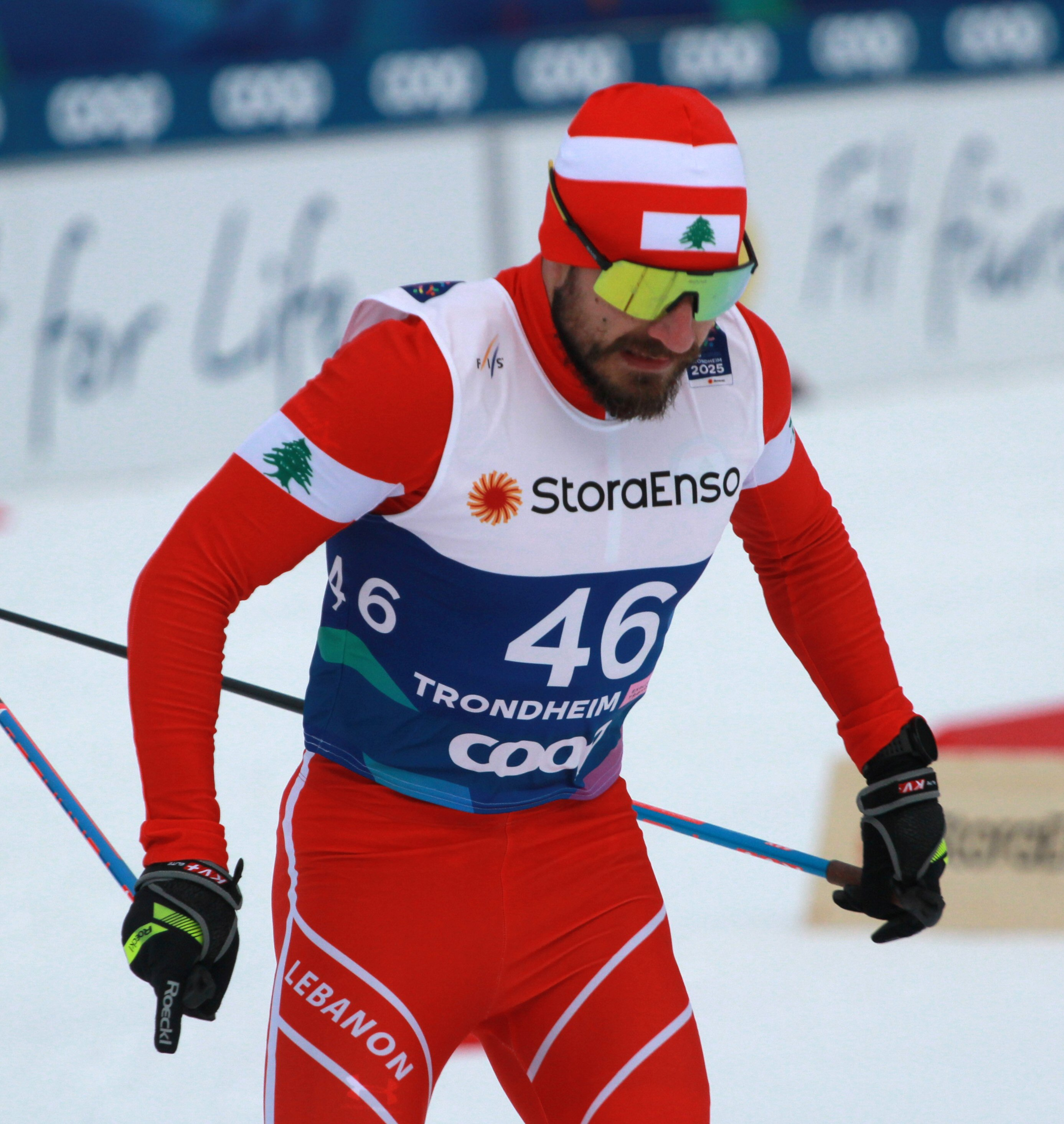
- Samer Tawk at a 2025 Cross Country meet in Trondheim

Personal information
- Nationality: Lebanese
- Born: 3 September 1998 (age 27) Bsharri, Lebanon

Sport
- Sport: Cross-country skiing

Samer Tawk (born 3 September 1998) is the first Lebanese Cross-Country Skier to qualify to the Winter Olympics, qualifying for the 2018 PyeongChang Winter Olympics. He returned to competition in the men's 10 kilometre freestyle at the 2026 Milano-Cortina Winter Olympics following 7 years of recovery after a life-threatening training injury in 2019.

== Career ==
In 2015, the Lebanese Federation brought in a coach from Serbia to help Tawk prepare for the 2018 Olympics in PyeongChang. He qualified for the men's 15 kilometre freestyle where he competed and placed 105th.

=== Injury and recovery ===
On 26 April 2019, Samer Tawk suffered a career-threatening accident when he fell from a height of approximately 14 meters during training. The fall resulted in multiple fractures to both his arms and legs. Due to the severity of the injuries, he was informed by doctors that he may not be able to return to competition ever again. Despite persevering through a lengthy rehabilitation process, he continues to experience long-term effects of the accident, including reduced sensation in his left leg in cold conditions, and limited mobility in his hand and elbow.

Unable to compete at the 2022 Beijing Winter Olympic Games, he served as a coach for the Lebanese delegation instead of as a competing athlete.

=== Return to competition ===
Following seven years of intensive training and recovery, Tawk successfully qualified for the 2026 Winter Olympics in Milan-Cortina. He was selected as one of two flag bearers for Lebanon, at the opening ceremony held at the San Siro stadium in Milan on 6 February 2026. He competed in the men's 10 kilometre freestyle where he finished 107th.
