= Ibrahim Geagea =

Lebanese alpine skier (1924–1985)

Personal information
- Nationality: Lebanese
- Born: 23 March 1924 Lebanon
- Died: 30 July 1985 (aged 61) Los Angeles, California, United States

Sport
- Sport: Alpine skiing

Ibrahim Geagea (23 March 1924 – 30 July 1985) was a Lebanese alpine skier. He competed at the 1948, 1952, 1956 and the 1960 Winter Olympics.
