= Chirine Njeim =

Lebanese alpine skier and long-distance runner

Personal information
- Born: October 4, 1984 (age 41) Beirut, Lebanon
- Height: 5 ft 1 in (1.55 m)

Skiing career
- Sport: Alpine skiing
- Club: Faraya Mzaar
- Disciplines: Downhill, super-G, Giant slalom, slalom, combined

Olympics
- Medals: 0

World Championships
- Medals: 0

Chirine Njeim (born October 4, 1984) is a Lebanese alpine skier and long-distance runner.

She represented Lebanon in the 2002, 2006 and the 2010 Winter Olympics, and the 2016 Summer Olympics.

== Biography ==
Njeim started skiing at age 3. At 12, she went to France to train for 2 of years with a personal coach.

She then moved to Salt Lake City in the United States in ninth grade, when she was 13, to attend the Rowmark Ski Academy, former home of U.S. Olympian Picabo Street. She went on to study at, and compete for, the University of Utah.

Njeim married Ronny Kamal, a Lebanese-American management consultant, in 2012 - the couple first met when they were seated together on a flight from Beirut to the United States in 2009. Since marrying the couple have lived in Chicago.

Whilst in Chicago Njeim took up running, completing the 2012 Chicago Marathon in 3 hours 7 minutes and the 2013 edition of the race in 3:05.4. At the 2015 Chicago Marathon she posted a time of 2:46.41, placing her 29th among the women in the field. At the 2016 Houston Marathon, she completed the course in 2:44.14, securing herself a place on the Lebanese team at the 2016 Summer Olympics. She finished the 2016 Olympic Marathon in 109th place with a time of 2:51.08.

== 2002 Winter Olympics ==
Sport	Event	Rank	Time
Alpine skiing	Women's slalom 1st Run	46	1:05.54
Alpine skiing	Women's slalom 2nd Run	36	1:07.94
Alpine skiing	Women's slalom Final Ranking	36	2:13.48
Alpine skiing	Women's giant slalom 1st Run	52	1:27.76
Alpine skiing	Women's giant slalom 2nd Run	46	1:25.66
Alpine skiing	Women's giant slalom Final Ranking	45	2:53.42

== 2006 Winter Olympics ==
Date	Time	Sport	Event	Rank	Time	Difference
February 15	12:00 p.m.	Alpine skiing	Women's Downhill	34	2:02.86	+ 6.37
February 17	17:00 p.m.	Alpine skiing	Women's Combined Slalom 1st Run	DNF	x	x
	19:30 p.m.	Alpine skiing	Women's Combined Slalom 2nd Run	x	x	x
		Alpine skiing	Women's Combined Final Ranking	x	x	x
February 18	14:00 p.m.	Alpine skiing	Women's Combined Downhill	DNF	x	x
February 20	12:00 p.m.	Alpine skiing	Women's Super-G	46	1:47.93	+ 5.46
February 22	14:45 p.m.	Alpine skiing	Women's slalom 1st Run	43	47.24	+ 4.86
	17:45 p.m.	Alpine skiing	Women's slalom 2nd Run	39	51.90	+ 5.24
		Alpine skiing	Women's slalom Final Ranking	39	1:39.14	+ 10.10
February 24	9:30 a.m.	Alpine skiing	Women's giant slalom 1st Run	41	1:06.80	+ 5.91
	13:00 p.m.	Alpine skiing	Women's giant slalom 2nd Run	DNF	x	x
		Alpine skiing	Women's giant slalom Final Ranking	x	x	x

== 2010 Winter Olympics ==
Date	Time	Sport	Event	Rank	Time	Difference
February 20	10:00 a.m.	Alpine skiing	Women's Super-G	37	1:29.59	+ 9.45
February 24	10:00 a.m.	Alpine skiing	Women's giant slalom 1st Run	50	1:23.28	+ 8.16
February 25	9:30 a.m.	Alpine skiing	Women's giant slalom 2nd Run	42	1:18.33	+7.18
		Alpine skiing	Women's giant slalom Final Ranking	43	2:41.61	+14.50
February 26	10:00 a.m.	Alpine skiing	Women's slalom 1st Run	53	58.97	+8.22
	1:15 p.m.	Alpine skiing	Women's slalom 2nd Run	43	59.23	+7.31
		Alpine skiing	Women's slalom Final Ranking	43	1:58.20	+15.31

== 2016 Summer Olympics ==
Date	Sport	Event	Rank	Time
August 14	Athletics	Women's Marathon	109	2:51:08
