= Jean Keyrouz =

Lebanese alpine skier (1931–2024)

Personal information
- Nationality: Lebanese
- Born: 1931
- Died: 6 December 2024 (aged 92–93)

Sport
- Sport: Alpine skiing

Jean Keyrouz (1931 – 6 December 2024) was a Lebanese alpine skier. He competed at the 1956 Winter Olympics and the 1964 Winter Olympics. Keyrouz was seen as a pioneer of skiing in Lebanon, and died on 6 December 2024.
