= Lebanese Olympic Committee =

National Olympic Committee

- Country: Lebanon
- [[|]]
- Code: LBN
- Created: 1947
- Recognized: 1948
- Continental Association: OCA
- Headquarters: Beirut, Lebanon
- President: Boutros Jalkh
- Website: www.lebolymp.org

The Lebanese Olympic Committee (Arabic: اللجنة الأولمبية اللبنانية; IOC code: LBN, 1964–2016: LIB) is the National Olympic Committee representing Lebanon.

In 1960 the Olympic Committee of Lebanon was awarded with the Count Alberto Bonacossa Trophy.

== Presidents ==
- Sheikh Gabriel Gemayel (1947-1988)
- Hussein Sejaan (1988)
- Toni Khoury (1988-1996)
- Souhail Khoury (1996-2005; 2006-2008)
- Antoine Chartier (2010-2013)
- Jean Hammam (2013-2021)
- Boutros Jalkh (2021- )

== See also ==
- Lebanon at the Olympics
