= Lebanon at the 2025 World Aquatics Championships =

- Flag of Lebanon
- World Aquatics code: LBN
- National federation: Lebanese Swimming Federation

in Singapore
- Competitors: 4 in 1 sport
- Medals: Gold 0 Silver 0 Bronze 0 Total 0

World Aquatics Championships appearances
- 1973; 1975; 1978; 1982; 1986; 1991; 1994; 1998; 2001; 2003; 2005; 2007; 2009; 2011; 2013; 2015; 2017; 2019; 2022; 2023; 2024; 2025

Lebanon is competing at the 2025 World Aquatics Championships in Singapore from 11 July to 3 August 2025.

== Competitors ==
The following is the list of competitors in the Championships.

Sport	Men	Women	Total
Swimming	2	2	4
Total	2	2	4

== Swimming ==
Men

Athlete	Event	Heat		Semifinal		Final	
Athlete	Event	Time	Rank	Time	Rank	Time	Rank
Munzer Kabbara	200 m medley	2:01.38 NR	25	Did not advance			
Munzer Kabbara	400 m medley	4:23.51 NR	24	—		Did not advance	
Ahmad Safie	50 m backstroke	26.20	53	Did not advance			
Ahmad Safie	100 m backstroke	56.94	49	Did not advance			

Women

Athlete	Event	Heat		Semifinal		Final	
Athlete	Event	Time	Rank	Time	Rank	Time	Rank
Lynn El Hajj	50 m breaststroke	32.25	36	Did not advance			
Lynn El Hajj	100 m breaststroke	1:10.85	42	Did not advance			
Taline Mrad	100 m backstroke	1:06.21	44	Did not advance			
Taline Mrad	200 m backstroke	2:22.74	38	Did not advance			
