= Lebanese Swimming at the Olympics =

For the first time in history, a Lebanese swimming team attended the 1968 Summer Olympics held in Mexico, with one male swimmer attending the event (Yacoub Masboungi). The first female Lebanese swimmer to attend an Olympics was Ani Jane Mugrditchian, at the 1972 Summer Olympics in Munich.

The Lebanese swimming teams never advanced past the heats at the Summer Olympics and consequently never won any medals. At the Summer Youth Olympics, Thea Obeid won Lebanon's first swimming medal, a silver in the girls' 50 m breaststroke at Dakar 2026.

== Men's participations at Summer Olympics ==
Olympics	Swimmer	Event	Heat Result	Ranking	Ref
1968 Summer Olympics Mexico	Yacoub Masboungi	100 Freestyle	1:00.5	58th of 64	
1968 Summer Olympics Mexico	Yacoub Masboungi	100 Backstroke	1:11.6	34th of 37	
1972 Summer Olympics Munich (West Germany)	Bruno Bassoul	100 Freestyle	1:00.08	47th of 48	
1972 Summer Olympics Munich (West Germany)	Bruno Bassoul	100 Breaststroke	1:19.94	44th of 44	
1972 Summer Olympics Munich (West Germany)	Bruno Bassoul	100 Butterfly	1:05.45	38th of 39	
1972 Summer Olympics Munich (West Germany)	Bruno Bassoul	200 Individual Medley	2:27.78	35th of 40	
1980 Summer Olympics Moscow (USSR)	Bilall Yamout	100 Freestyle	1:03.48	37th of 39	
1980 Summer Olympics Moscow (USSR)	Bilall Yamout	200 Freestyle	2:27.94	41st of 42	
1980 Summer Olympics Moscow (USSR)	Ibrahim El-Baba	100 Butterfly	1:05.20	30th of 34	
1984 Summer Olympics Los Angeles	Percy Sayegh	100 Freestyle	1:01.88	66th of 68	
1984 Summer Olympics Los Angeles	Percy Sayegh	200 Freestyle	2:20.76	55th of 56	
1984 Summer Olympics Los Angeles	Rami Kantari	100 Freestyle	1:01.96	67th of 68	
1984 Summer Olympics Los Angeles	Rami Kantari	200 Freestyle	2:25.43	56th of 56	
1984 Summer Olympics Los Angeles	Rami Kantari	100 Backstroke	-	DSQ	
1984 Summer Olympics Los Angeles	Ibrahim El-Baba	100 Backstroke	1:13.76	44th of 44	
1984 Summer Olympics Los Angeles	Ibrahim El-Baba	100 Butterfly	1:04.48	47th of 53	
1984 Summer Olympics Los Angeles	Amine El-Domyati	100 Breaststroke	1:19.10	50th of 50	
1988 Summer Olympics Seoul	Rami Kantari	100 Backstroke	1:09.35	50th of 52	
1988 Summer Olympics Seoul	Rami Kantari	200 Backstroke	2:40.29	41st of 41	
1988 Summer Olympics Seoul	Rami Kantari	200 Individual Medley	2:34.53	56th of 56	
1988 Summer Olympics Seoul	Amine El-Domyati	50 Freestyle	27.34	67th of 69	
1988 Summer Olympics Seoul	Amine El-Domyati	100 Breaststroke	1:14.40	57th of 61	
1988 Summer Olympics Seoul	Amine El-Domyati	200 Breaststroke	2:44.34	51st of 52	
1988 Summer Olympics Seoul	Emile Lahoud	100 Freestyle	1:02.40	75th of 76	
1988 Summer Olympics Seoul	Emile Lahoud	200 Freestyle	2:16.39	63rd of 63	
1988 Summer Olympics Seoul	Emile Lahoud	400 Freestyle	4:47.09	48th of 49	
1992 Summer Olympics Barcelona	Emile Lahoud	50 Freestyle	25.76	61st of 72	
1992 Summer Olympics Barcelona	Emile Lahoud	100 Freestyle	55.51	63rd of 75	
1992 Summer Olympics Barcelona	Emile Lahoud	200 Freestyle	2:01.06	47th of 54	
1992 Summer Olympics Barcelona	Emile Lahoud	200 Individual Medley	2:22.08	47th of 52	
2000 Summer Olympics Sydney	Ragi Edde	100 Freestyle	59.26	68th of 71	
2004 Summer Olympics Athens	Abed Rahman Kaaki	50 Freestyle	24.68	57th of 83	
2008 Summer Olympics Beijing	Wael Koubrousli	100 Breaststroke	1:06.22	57th of 63	
2012 Summer Olympics London	Wael Koubrousli	100 Breaststroke	1:07.06	44th of 44	
2016 Summer Olympics Rio de Janeiro	Anthony Barbar	50 Freestyle	23.77	50th of 85	
2020 Summer Olympics Tokyo	Munzer Kabbara	200 Individual Medley	2:03.08	41st of 45	
2024 Summer Olympics Paris	Simon Doueihy	100 Freestyle	50.10	42nd of 79	

== Women's participations at Summer Olympics ==
Olympics	Swimmer	Event	Heat Result	Ranking	Ref
1972 Summer Olympics Munich (West Germany)	Ani Jane Mugrditchian	100 Breaststroke	1:29.71	40th of 40	
1988 Summer Olympics Seoul	Nancy Khalaf	50 Freestyle	30.77	50th of 50	
1988 Summer Olympics Seoul	Nancy Khalaf	100 Freestyle	1:06.73	56th of 57	
2000 Summer Olympics Sydney	Rola El Haress	100 Freestyle	1:03.26	48th of 54	
2004 Summer Olympics Athens	Ghazal El Jobeili	50 Freestyle	31.00	63rd of 73	
2008 Summer Olympics Beijing	Nibal Yamout	100 Breaststroke	1:16.17	45th of 49	
2012 Summer Olympics London	Katya Bachrouche	800 Freestyle	8:35.88	19th of 35	
2016 Summer Olympics Rio de Janeiro	Gabriella Doueihy	400 Freestyle	4:31.21	31st of 32	
2020 Summer Olympics Tokyo	Gabriella Doueihy	200 Freestyle	2:11.29	29th of 29	
2024 Summer Olympics Paris	Lynn El Hajj	100 Breaststroke	1:10.27	31st of 37	

== Boys' participations at Summer Youth Olympics ==
Youth Olympics	Swimmer	Event	Result	Ranking	Ref
2010 Summer Youth Olympics Singapore	Abbas Raad	50 Freestyle	25.26 (heats)	30th of 50	
2010 Summer Youth Olympics Singapore	Abbas Raad	50 Backstroke	28.76 (semifinal)	13th of 15	
2018 Summer Youth Olympics Buenos Aires	Ramy El Ghaziri	100 Backstroke	58.27 (heats)	21st of 25	

== Girls' participations at Summer Youth Olympics ==
Youth Olympics	Swimmer	Event	Result	Ranking	Ref
2010 Summer Youth Olympics Singapore	Nibal Yamout	200 Breaststroke	2:46.96 (heats)	19th of 20	
2010 Summer Youth Olympics Singapore	Nibal Yamout	200 Individual Medley	2:32.23 (heats)	23rd of 23	
2014 Summer Youth Olympics Nanjing	Christelle Doueihy	400 Freestyle	4:38.30 (heats)	33rd of 33	
2014 Summer Youth Olympics Nanjing	Christelle Doueihy	800 Freestyle	9:26.26 (timed final)	25th of 27	
2026 Summer Youth Olympics Dakar	Thea Obeid	50 Breaststroke	32.00 (final); 31.98 (heats)	2nd of 30 (silver medal)	
2026 Summer Youth Olympics Dakar	Thea Obeid	100 Breaststroke	1:12.53 (final); 1:14.67 (heats)	5th of 23 (8th of 23 in heats)	

== See also ==
- Lebanese Swimming Federation
- List of Lebanese records in swimming
