= List of Lebanese records in swimming =

The Lebanese records in swimming are the fastest ever performances of swimmers from Lebanon, which are recognized and ratified by the Lebanese Swimming Federation.

All records were set in finals unless noted otherwise.

== Long Course (50 m) ==
=== Men ===
| Event | Time | | Name | Club | Date | Meet | Location | Ref |
|---|---|---|---|---|---|---|---|---|
| 50 m freestyle | 23.36 | | Simon Doueihy | Lebanon | 20 April 2024 | Berlin Swim Open | Berlin, Germany | |
| 100 m freestyle | 49.69 | h | Simon Doueihy | Lebanon | 20 June 2024 | Spanish Championships | Palma de Mallorca, Spain | |
| 200 m freestyle | 1:51.11 | | Simon Doueihy | Lebanon | 13 April 2023 | Lithuanian Championships | Kaunas, Lithuania | |
| 400 m freestyle | 3:59.59 | h | Adib Khalil | AS Monaco Natation | 29 May 2021 | Mare Nostrum | Monte Carlo, Monaco | |
| 800 m freestyle | 8:15.24 | h | Adib Khalil | AS Monaco Natation | 16 June 2021 | French Championships | Chartres, France | |
| 1500 m freestyle | 15:54.30 | | Adib Khalil | AS Monaco Natation | 13 March 2021 | Meeting Open PACA Qualificatif # 2 | Nice, France | |
| 50 m backstroke | 26.11 | | Ahmad Safie | Lebanon | 26 August 2024 | Arab Championships | Cairo, Egypt | |
| 100 m backstroke | 56.51 | | Ahmad Safie | Lebanon | 28 August 2024 | Arab Championships | Cairo, Egypt | |
| 200 m backstroke | 2:03.38 | | Ahmad Safie | Lebanon | 27 August 2024 | Arab Championships | Cairo, Egypt | |
| 50 m breaststroke | 29.38 | h | Wael Koubrousli | Lebanon | 27 March 2007 | World Championships | Melbourne, Australia | |
| 100 m breaststroke | 1:04.54 | | Munzer Mark Kabbara | Lebanon | 11 February 2024 | World Championships | Doha, Qatar | |
| 200 m breaststroke | 2:19.41 | h | Munzer Mark Kabbara | Lebanon | 28 September 2023 | Asian Games | Hangzhou, China | |
| 50 m butterfly | 24.25 | | Anthony Barbar | Westminster Academy | 9 July 2016 | Speedo Southern Zone South Sectional Championships | Florida, United States | |
| 100 m butterfly | 54.05 | | Adam Ismail Allouche | Lebanon | 28 May 2016 | XI Circuito Open C.Madrid - VII T.Verano | Madrid, Spain | |
| 200 m butterfly | 2:04.12 | | Munzer Mark Kabbara | Unattached | 27 April 2025 | Aggieland April Invitational | College Station, United States | |
| 200 m individual medley | 2:01.38 | h | Munzer Mark Kabbara | Lebanon | 30 July 2025 | World Championships | Singapore, Singapore | |
| 400 m individual medley | 4:23.51 | h | Munzer Mark Kabbara | Lebanon | 3 August 2025 | World Championships | Singapore, Singapore | |
| 4×50 m freestyle relay | 1:45.94 | | | Lebanon | 2006 | | | |
| 4×100 m freestyle relay | 3:32.57 | | Ahmad Safie; Alexandre Younes; Farid Zeidan; Simon Doueihy | Lebanon | October 2023 | Arab Championships | Abu Dhabi, United Arab Emirates | |
| 4×200 m freestyle relay | 7:57.01 | | Ahmad Safie; Alexandre Younes; Farid Zeidan; Simon Doueihy | Lebanon | October 2023 | Arab Championships | Abu Dhabi, United Arab Emirates | |
| 4×50 m medley relay | 1:59.89 | | | Lebanon | 2006 | | | |
| 4×100 m medley relay | 3:58.45 | | Ahmad Safie; Alexandre Younes; Farid Zeidan; Simon Doueihy | Lebanon | October 2023 | Arab Championships | Abu Dhabi, United Arab Emirates | |

Legend: # – Record awaiting ratification by Lebanese Swimming Federation; WR – World record; AS – Asian record; e – equalled existing record;
Records not set in finals: h – heat; sf – semifinal; r – relay 1st leg; rh – relay heat 1st leg; b – B final; † – en route to final mark; so – swim-off; tt – time trial

=== Women ===
| Event | Time | | Name | Club | Date | Meet | Location | Ref |
|---|---|---|---|---|---|---|---|---|
| 50 m freestyle | 26.48 | h | Lynn El Hajj | AUB Beirut | 5 November 2026 | World InterUniversities Championships | Bratislava, Slovakia | |
| 100 m freestyle | 58.75 | | Loricia Rita Awad | Swim Streamline at Northampton | 12 July 2026 | Gulf Championships | Houston, United States | |
| 200 m freestyle | 2:01.83 | | Katya Bachrouche | Lebanon | 17 December 2011 | Pan Arab Games | Doha, Qatar | |
| 400 m freestyle | 4:15.06 | | Katya Bachrouche | Lebanon | 15 August 2011 | Universiade | Shenzhen, China | |
| 800 m freestyle | 8:35.88 | h | Katya Bachrouche | Lebanon | 2 August 2012 | Olympic Games | London, United Kingdom | |
| 1500 m freestyle | 16:54.72 | h | Katya Bachrouche | Lebanon | 18 August 2011 | Universiade | Shenzhen, China | |
| 50 m backstroke | 30.39 | h | Marie Khoury | Lebanon | 24 July 2019 | World Championships | Gwangju, South Korea | |
| 100 m backstroke | 1:05.68 | b | Taline Mrad | Lebanon | 10 April 2024 | Hungarian Championships | Budapest, Hungary | |
| 200 m backstroke | 2:19.07 | b | Taline Mrad | Lebanon | 12 April 2024 | Hungarian Championships | Budapest, Hungary | |
| 50 m breaststroke | 31.85 | | Lynn El Hajj | Lebanon | 12 April 2024 | Hungarian Championships | Budapest, Hungary | |
| 100 m breaststroke | 1:08.56 | | Lynn El Hajj | Lebanon | 27 June 2026 | Grand Prix Slovakia | Šamorín, Slovakia | |
| 200 m breaststroke | 2:29.01 | | Lynn El Hajj | Lebanon | 28 June 2026 | Grand Prix Slovakia | Šamorín, Slovakia | |
| 50 m butterfly | 28.52 | | Milan Naboulsi | My Swim Club | 7 February 2026 | Dubai Open Championships | Dubai, United Arab Emirates | |
| 100 m butterfly | 1:02.61 | | Loricia Rita Awad | Swim Streamline at Northampton | 7 June 2025 | Texas Senior Circuit Meet | Dallas, United States | |
| 200 m butterfly | 2:18.05 | | Katya Bachrouche | Farmington Family Y Stingray | 8 August 2006 | United States Junior Championships | Irvine, United States | |
| 200 m individual medley | 2:17.10 | | Katya Bachrouche | Lebanon | 19 December 2011 | Pan Arab Games | Doha, Qatar | |
| 400 m individual medley | 4:55.45 | | Katya Bachrouche | University of Virginia | 5 August 2010 | USA Championships | Irvine, United States | |
| 4×50 m freestyle relay | 2:00.35 | | (28.82); (30.14); (31.18); (30.21) | Jamhour | 13 May 2018 | Lebanese Championships | Beirut, Lebanon | |
| 4×100 m freestyle relay | 4:03.17 | | Rebecca Najem Mezher (1:00.24); Marie Khoury (1:01.65); Jennifer Mallah (1:01.50); Gabriella Doueihy (59.78) | Lebanon | 15 July 2018 | Arab Championships | Rades, Tunisia | |
| 4×200 m freestyle relay | 8:55.42 | | Hiba Doueihy (2:21.77); Marie Khoury (2:09.98); Alexia Khoury (2:18.11); Gabriella Doueihy (2:05.56) | Lebanon | 14 July 2018 | Arab Championships | Rades, Tunisia | |
| 4×50 m medley relay | 2:22.78 | | | Lebanon | 2006 | Beirut, Lebanon | | |
| 4×100 m medley relay | 4:25.01 | | Alexia Khoury; Christelle Doueihy; Gabriella Doueihy; Jennifer Rizkallah | Lebanon | 9 April 2015 | 12th Arab Championships | Dubai, United Arab Emirates | |

Legend: # – Record awaiting ratification by Lebanese Swimming Federation; WR – World record; AS – Asian record; e – equalled existing record;
Records not set in finals: h – heat; sf – semifinal; r – relay 1st leg; rh – relay heat 1st leg; b – B final; † – en route to final mark; so – swim-off; tt – time trial

=== Mixed relay ===
| Event | Time | Name | Club | Date | Meet | Location | Ref |
|---|---|---|---|---|---|---|---|
| 4×100 m freestyle relay | 3:56.61 | Lucas Sleiman; Karen Ibrahim; Angela Doumanian; Rafic Nsouli | Lebanon | 28 August 2025 | 4th Arab Age Group Championships | Casablanca, Morocco | |
| 4×100 m medley relay | 4:16.68 | Rafic Nsouli; Thea Obeid; Rayan Arkadan; Angela Doumanian | Lebanon | 31 August 2025 | 4th Arab Age Group Championships | Casablanca, Morocco | |

Legend: # – Record awaiting ratification by Lebanese Swimming Federation; WR – World record; AS – Asian record; e – equalled existing record;
Records not set in finals: h – heat; so – swim-off

== Short Course (25 m) ==
=== Men ===
| Event | Time | | Name | Club | Date | Meet | Location | Ref |
|---|---|---|---|---|---|---|---|---|
| 50m freestyle | 22.93 | h | Basil Kaaki | Lebanon | 10 April 2008 | World Championships | Manchester, Great Britain | |
| 50m freestyle | 22.60 | # | Simon Doueihy | Aquamarina | 9 March 2024 | | | |
| 100m freestyle | 47.91 | h | Simon Doueihy | Lebanon | 11 December 2024 | World Championships | Budapest, Hungary | |
| 200m freestyle | 1:45.32 | h | Simon Doueihy | Lebanon | 15 December 2024 | World Championships | Budapest, Hungary | |
| 400m freestyle | 3:51.97 | | Simon Doueihy | Aquamarina | 30 April 2023 | Lebanese Championships | Jamhour, Lebanon | |
| 800m freestyle | 8:10.37 | h, † | Adib Khalil | Lebanon | 20 December 2021 | World Championships | Abu Dhabi, United Arab Emirates | |
| 1500m freestyle | 15:27.12 | h | Adib Khalil | Lebanon | 20 December 2021 | World Championships | Abu Dhabi, United Arab Emirates | |
| 50m backstroke | 24.76 | | Ahmad Safie | Lebanon | 6 November 2024 | Hungarian Championships | Kaposvár, Hungary | |
| 100m backstroke | 53.99 | | Ahmad Safie | Lebanon | 7 November 2024 | Hungarian Championships | Kaposvár, Hungary | |
| 200m backstroke | 1:57.22 | | Ahmad Safie | Lebanon | 9 November 2024 | Hungarian Championships | Kaposvár, Hungary | |
| 50m breaststroke | 28.00 | h | Adam Ismail Allouche | C.O. Ulis Natation | 20 December 2015 | Championnats de Nationale 2 | Chevreuse, France | |
| 100m breaststroke | 1:02.11 | | Youssef Abboud | Bucharest Sport Club Elite | 25 October 2026 | Andrei Nicolescu Cup | Otopeni, Romania | |
| 200m breaststroke | 2:16.50 | | Wael Koubrousli | Lebanon | 18 April 2008 | Lebanese Championships | Beirut, Lebanon | |
| 50m butterfly | 24.08 | | Anthony Barbar | Lebanon | 24 September 2017 | Asian Indoor and Martial Arts Games | Ashgabat, Turkmenistan | |
| 100m butterfly | 54.30 | h | Karl Abou Ghannam | Lebanon | 31 October 2024 | World Cup | Singapore, Singapore | |
| 200m butterfly | 2:01.07 | h | Alexandre Younes | McGill University | 9 March 2024 | Usports Championships UL | Montreal, Canada | |
| 100m individual medley | 54.03 | h | Munzer Mark Kabbara | Lebanon | 12 December 2024 | World Championships | Budapest, Hungary | |
| 200m individual medley | 1:55.31 | h | Munzer Mark Kabbara | Lebanon | 10 December 2024 | World Championships | Budapest, Hungary | |
| 400m individual medley | 4:21.59 | h | Munzer Mark Kabbara | Lebanon | 15 December 2018 | World Championships | Hangzhou, China | |
| 4×50m freestyle relay | 1:37.42 | h | Adam Ismail Allouche (23.63); Maroun Waked (25.06); Charlie Salame (24.45); Mahmoud Daaboul (24.28) | Lebanon | 6 December 2014 | World Championships | Doha, Qatar | |
| 4×100m freestyle relay | 3:40.39 | | Andrew Ghanem (55.95); Theo Mahfoud (57.66); Matias Sleiman (56.47); Farid Zeidan (50.31) | Club Sportif Jamhour | 3 October 2026 | Lebanese Championships | Lebanon | |
| 4×200m freestyle relay | | | | | | | | |
| 4×50m medley relay | 1:47.55 | h | Maroun Waked (27.57); Charlie Salame (29.84); Adam Ismail Allouche (25.18); Mahmoud Daaboul (24.96) | Lebanon | 4 December 2014 | World Championships | Doha, Qatar | |
| 4×100m medley relay | 4:23.46 | | Jude Aoun (1:06.79); Ghassan Zein (1:13.25); Omar Sinno (1:03.29); Karim Bou Khzam (1:00.13) | Najjah Lebanon | 4 October 2026 | Lebanese Championships | Lebanon | |

Legend: # – Record awaiting ratification by Lebanese Swimming Federation; WR – World record; AS – Asian record; e – equalled existing record;
Records not set in finals: h – heat; sf – semifinal; r – relay 1st leg; rh – relay heat 1st leg; b – B final; † – en route to final mark; so – swim-off; tt – time trial

=== Women ===
| Event | Time | | Name | Club | Date | Meet | Location | Ref |
|---|---|---|---|---|---|---|---|---|
| 50m freestyle | 26.31 | h | Marie Khoury | Lebanon | 21 October 2021 | World Cup | Doha, Qatar | |
| 100m freestyle | 57.29 | h | Rebecca Najem Mezher | Lebanon | 8 November 2024 | Algarve International Meeting | Albufeira, Portugal | |
| 200m freestyle | 2:03.40 | | Gabriella Doueihy | McGill University | 24 November 2019 | Coupe Universitaire | Québec, Canada | |
| 400m freestyle | 4:22.40 | | Gabriella Doueihy | McGill University | 10 November 2018 | Championnat provincial universitaire RSEQ #3 | Ottawa, Canada | |
| 800m freestyle | 8:55.50 | | Gabriella Doueihy | McGill University | 24 November 2019 | Coupe Universitaire | Québec, Canada | |
| 1500m freestyle | 17:17.12 | | Gabriella Doueihy | Lebanon | 29 October 2022 | World Cup | Toronto, Canada | |
| 50m backstroke | 28.74 | | Marie Khoury | Lebanon | 21 October 2021 | World Cup | Doha, Qatar | |
| 100m backstroke | 1:03.54 | h | Taline Mrad | Lebanon | 10 December 2024 | World Championships | Budapest, Hungary | |
| 200m backstroke | 2:16.30 | h | Taline Mrad | Lebanon | 15 December 2024 | World Championships | Budapest, Hungary | |
| 50m breaststroke | 31.67 | h | Lynn El Hajj | Lebanon | 14 December 2024 | World Championships | Budapest, Hungary | |
| 50m breaststroke | 31.56 | # | Thea Obeid | Najjah Lebanon | 4 October 2026 | Lebanese Championships | Lebanon | |
| 100m breaststroke | 1:08.36 | h | Lynn El Hajj | Lebanon | 11 December 2024 | World Championships | Budapest, Hungary | |
| 200m breaststroke | 2:34.84 | | Nibal Yamout | Carabins | 24 February 2012 | SIC Championships | Montreal, Canada | |
| 50m butterfly | 27.98 | | Rebecca Najem Mezher | Lebanon | 10 November 2024 | Algarve International Meeting | Albufeira, Portugal | |
| 100m butterfly | 1:03.25 | = | Hiba Doueihy | Lebanon | 23 April 2019 | Lebanese Championships | Beirut, Lebanon | |
| 100m butterfly | 1:03.25 | = | Gabriella Helayel | Lebanon | 11 December 2019 | Lebanese Championships | Beirut, Lebanon | |
| 200m butterfly | 2:24.60 | | Angela Doumanian | LSA Mtayleb | 21 April 2024 | Lebanese Championships | Beirut, Lebanon | |
| 100m individual medley | 1:06.35 | | Gabriella Helayel | Hamilton Aquatics | 19 October 2018 | Hamilton Aquatics Short Course Meet | Dubai, United Arab Emirates | |
| 100m individual medley | 1:06.11 | # | Thea Obeid | Najjah Lebanon | 3 October 2026 | Lebanese Championships | Lebanon | |
| 200m individual medley | 2:21.55 | | Simone Kabbara | Lebanon | 24 October 2021 | Arab Age Group Championships | Abu Dhabi, United Arab Emirates | |
| 400m individual medley | 4:52.01 | | Gabriella Doueihy | McGill University | 24 November 2019 | Coupe Universitaire | Québec, Canada | |
| 4×50m freestyle relay | 1:55.04 | | Skye Aoun (28.81); Liane Dbaibo (28.50); Naya Yazbek (29.78); Thea Obeid (27.95) | Najjah Lebanon | 4 October 2026 | Lebanese Championships | Lebanon | |
| 4×100m freestyle relay | 4:10.03 | | Maria Saba (1:02.45); Yara Darazi (1:03.29); Elena Chaaban (1:03.66); Yasmina Hajj Ali (1:00.63) | Najjah Lebanon | 3 October 2026 | Lebanese Championships | Lebanon | |
| 4×200m freestyle relay | | | | | | | | |
| 4×50m medley relay | 2:04.89 | | Liane Dbaibo (32.38); Thea Obeid (31.01); Naya Yazbek (32.57); Skye Aoun (28.93) | Najjah Lebanon | 3 October 2026 | Lebanese Championships | Lebanon | |
| 4×100m medley relay | 4:36.15 | | Liane Dbaibo (1:10.69); Thea Obeid (1:10.72); Naya Yazbek (1:11.33); Skye Aoun (1:03.41) | Najjah Lebanon | 4 October 2026 | Lebanese Championships | Lebanon | |

Legend: # – Record awaiting ratification by Lebanese Swimming Federation; WR – World record; AS – Asian record; e – equalled existing record;
Records not set in finals: h – heat; sf – semifinal; r – relay 1st leg; rh – relay heat 1st leg; b – B final; † – en route to final mark; so – swim-off; tt – time trial

=== Mixed relay ===
| Event | Time | Name | Club | Date | Meet | Location | Ref |
|---|---|---|---|---|---|---|---|
| 4×50m freestyle relay | 1:45.36 | Mohamad Balhawan (25.18); Lea Saleh (29.09); Lynn El Hajj (27.27); Ahmad Safie (23.82) | Jazeera | 30 April 2023 | Lebanese Championships | Jamhour, Lebanon | |
| 4×50m medley relay | 1:56.88 | Mohamad Kheir Daoud (29.32); Thea Obeid (31.07); Naya Yazbek (31.87); Andrew Aintablian (24.62) | Najjah Lebanon | 4 October 2026 | Lebanese Championships | Lebanon | |

Legend: # – Record awaiting ratification by Lebanese Swimming Federation; WR – World record; AS – Asian record; e – equalled existing record;
Records not set in finals: h – heat; so – swim-off

== See also ==
- Lebanese Swimming Federation
- Lebanese Swimming at the Olympics
