= Lebanon at the 2023 World Aquatics Championships =

- Flag of Lebanon
- FINA code: LBN
- National federation: Lebanese Swimming Federation

in Fukuoka, Japan
- Competitors: 4 in 2 sports
- Medals: Gold 0 Silver 0 Bronze 0 Total 0

World Aquatics Championships appearances
- 1973; 1975; 1978; 1982; 1986; 1991; 1994; 1998; 2001; 2003; 2005; 2007; 2009; 2011; 2013; 2015; 2017; 2019; 2022; 2023; 2024

Lebanon is set to compete at the 2023 World Aquatics Championships in Fukuoka, Japan from 14 to 30 July.

== Swimming ==
Lebanon entered 4 swimmers.

Men

| Athlete | Event | Heat | | Semifinal | | Final | |
| Athlete | Event | Time | Rank | Time | Rank | Time | Rank |
|---|---|---|---|---|---|---|---|
| Simon Doueihy | 100 metre freestyle | 51.08 | 55 | Did not advance | | | |
| Simon Doueihy | 200 metre freestyle | 1:55.96 | 57 | Did not advance | | | |
| Munzer Kabbara | 200 metre individual medley | 2:02.99 NR | 28 | Did not advance | | | |
| Munzer Kabbara | 400 metre individual medley | 4:28.66 | 26 | — | | Did not advance | |

Women

| Athlete | Event | Heat | | Semifinal | | Final | |
| Athlete | Event | Time | Rank | Time | Rank | Time | Rank |
|---|---|---|---|---|---|---|---|
| Lynn El Hajj | 50 metre breaststroke | 33.10 NR | 39 | Did not advance | | | |
| Lynn El Hajj | 100 metre breaststroke | 1:11.57 | 43 | Did not advance | | | |
| Marie Khoury | 50 metre freestyle | 27.04 | 56 | Did not advance | | | |
| Marie Khoury | 50 metre backstroke | 31.14 | 46 | Did not advance | | | |
