= Lebanon at the 2015 World Aquatics Championships =

- Flag of Lebanon
- World Aquatics code: LIB
- National federation: Federation Libanaise de Natation

in Kazan, Russia
- Competitors: 4 in 1 sport
- Medals: Gold 0 Silver 0 Bronze 0 Total 0

World Aquatics Championships appearances
- 1973; 1975; 1978; 1982; 1986; 1991; 1994; 1998; 2001; 2003; 2005; 2007; 2009; 2011; 2013; 2015; 2017; 2019; 2022; 2023; 2024; 2025

Lebanon competed at the 2015 World Aquatics Championships in Kazan, Russia from 24 July to 9 August 2015.

== Swimming ==
Lebanese swimmers have achieved qualifying standards in the following events (up to a maximum of 2 swimmers in each event at the A-standard entry time, and 1 at the B-standard):

Men

Athlete	Event	Heat		Semifinal		Final	
Athlete	Event	Time	Rank	Time	Rank	Time	Rank
Adam Allouche	50 m backstroke	29.91	60	did not advance			
Adam Allouche	50 m breaststroke	29.45	51	did not advance			
Anthony Barbar	50 m freestyle	24.31	63	did not advance			
Anthony Barbar	50 m butterfly	24.88	45	did not advance			

Women

Athlete	Event	Heat		Semifinal		Final	
Athlete	Event	Time	Rank	Time	Rank	Time	Rank
Gabriella Doueihy	400 m freestyle	4:35.09	45	—N/a		did not advance	
Gabriella Doueihy	800 m freestyle	9:18.30	40	—N/a		did not advance	
Jennifer Rizkallah	50 m freestyle	27.76	68	did not advance			
Jennifer Rizkallah	100 m freestyle	1:01.16	75	did not advance			
