= Lebanon at the 2019 World Aquatics Championships =

Lebanon at the 2017 World Aquatics Championships
- Flag of Lebanon
- FINA code: LIB
- National federation: Federation Libanaise de Natation

in Gwangju, South Korea
- Competitors: 4 in 1 sport
- Medals: Gold 0 Silver 0 Bronze 0 Total 0

World Aquatics Championships appearances
- 1973; 1975; 1978; 1982; 1986; 1991; 1994; 1998; 2001; 2003; 2005; 2007; 2009; 2011; 2013; 2015; 2017; 2019; 2022; 2023; 2024

Lebanon competed at the 2019 World Aquatics Championships in Gwangju, South Korea from 12 to 28 July.

== Swimming ==
Lebanon entered four swimmers.

Men

Athlete	Event	Heat		Semifinal		Final	
Athlete	Event	Time	Rank	Time	Rank	Time	Rank
Munzer Kabbara	200 m individual medley	2:07.27	41	did not advance			
Munzer Kabbara	400 m individual medley	4:35.58	38	—		did not advance	
Adib Khalil	400 m freestyle	4:06.70	43	—		did not advance	
Adib Khalil	1500 m freestyle	16:19.51	35	—		did not advance	

Women

Athlete	Event	Heat		Semifinal		Final	
Athlete	Event	Time	Rank	Time	Rank	Time	Rank
Gabriella Doueihy	200 m freestyle	2:09.07	42	did not advance			
Gabriella Doueihy	800 m freestyle	9:19.78	37	—		did not advance	
Marie Khoury	50 m freestyle	27.85	=59	did not advance			
Marie Khoury	50 m backstroke	30.39	30	did not advance			
