= Lebanon at the 2017 World Aquatics Championships =

- Flag of Lebanon
- World Aquatics code: LIB
- National federation: Federation Libanaise de Natation

in Budapest, Hungary
- Competitors: 4 in 1 sport
- Medals: Gold 0 Silver 0 Bronze 0 Total 0

World Aquatics Championships appearances
- 1973; 1975; 1978; 1982; 1986; 1991; 1994; 1998; 2001; 2003; 2005; 2007; 2009; 2011; 2013; 2015; 2017; 2019; 2022; 2023; 2024; 2025

Lebanon competed at the 2017 World Aquatics Championships in Budapest, Hungary from 14 July to 30 July.

== Swimming ==
Lebanon has received a Universality invitation from FINA to send a maximum of four swimmers (two men and two women) to the World Championships.

Athlete	Event	Heat		Semifinal		Final	
Athlete	Event	Time	Rank	Time	Rank	Time	Rank
Anthony Barbar	Men's 50 m freestyle	23.76	=71	did not advance			
Anthony Barbar	Men's 50 m butterfly	25.17	50	did not advance			
Anthony Souaiby	Men's 100 m freestyle	53.62	78	did not advance			
Anthony Souaiby	Men's 50 m breaststroke	30.84	65	did not advance			
Gabriella Doueihy	Women's 400 m freestyle	4:25.34	30	—N/a		did not advance	
Gabriella Doueihy	Women's 800 m freestyle	9:19.43	36	—N/a		did not advance	
Jennifer Rizkallah	Women's 50 m backstroke	31.65	54	did not advance			
Jennifer Rizkallah	Women's 100 m backstroke	1:10.36	52	did not advance			
