= Lebanon at the 2024 World Aquatics Championships =

- Flag of Lebanon
- FINA code: LBN
- National federation: Lebanese Swimming Federation

in Doha, Qatar
- Competitors: 4 in 1 sport
- Medals: Gold 0 Silver 0 Bronze 0 Total 0

World Aquatics Championships appearances
- 1973; 1975; 1978; 1982; 1986; 1991; 1994; 1998; 2001; 2003; 2005; 2007; 2009; 2011; 2013; 2015; 2017; 2019; 2022; 2023; 2024

Lebanon competed at the 2024 World Aquatics Championships in Doha, Qatar from 2 to 18 February.

== Competitors ==
The following is the list of competitors in the Championships.

Sport	Men	Women	Total
Swimming	2	2	4
Total	2	2	4

== Swimming ==
Lebanon entered 4 swimmers.

Men

Athlete	Event	Heat		Semifinal		Final	
Athlete	Event	Time	Rank	Time	Rank	Time	Rank
Munzer Kabbara	100 metre breaststroke	1:04.54 NR	55	Did not advance			
Munzer Kabbara	200 metre individual medley	2:03.31	23	Did not advance			
Ahmad Safie	100 metre backstroke	58.32	43	Did not advance			
Ahmad Safie	200 metre backstroke	2:08.37	31	Did not advance			

Women

Athlete	Event	Heat		Semifinal		Final	
Athlete	Event	Time	Rank	Time	Rank	Time	Rank
Lana Hijazi	200 metre freestyle	2:11.95	43	Did not advance			
Lana Hijazi	800 metre freestyle	9:33.90	25	—		Did not advance	
Rebecca Najem	100 metre freestyle	58.90	37	Did not advance			
Rebecca Najem	100 metre butterfly	1:05.57	38	Did not advance			
