= Lebanon at the 2011 World Aquatics Championships =

- Flag of Lebanon
- FINA code: LIB
- National federation: Federation Libanaise de Natation

in Shanghai, China
- Competitors: 3 in 1 sports
- Medals: Gold 0 Silver 0 Bronze 0 Total 0

World Aquatics Championships appearances
- 1973; 1975; 1978; 1982; 1986; 1991; 1994; 1998; 2001; 2003; 2005; 2007; 2009; 2011; 2013; 2015; 2017; 2019; 2022; 2023; 2024

Lebanon competed at the 2011 World Aquatics Championships in Shanghai, China between July 16 and 31, 2011.

== Swimming ==
3 Lebanese swimmers qualified.

Men

| Athlete | Event | Heats | | Semifinals | | Final | |
| Athlete | Event | Time | Rank | Time | Rank | Time | Rank |
|---|---|---|---|---|---|---|---|
| Abbas Raad | Men's 50m Freestyle | 24.95 | 64 | did not advance | | | |
| Abbas Raad | Men's 100m Freestyle | 54.91 | 73 | did not advance | | | |
| Wael Koubrousli | Men's 100m Breaststroke | 1:09.11 | 73 | did not advance | | | |
| Wael Koubrousli | Men's 200m Breaststroke | 2:27.08 | 50 | did not advance | | | |

Women

| Athlete | Event | Heats | | Semifinals | | Final | |
| Athlete | Event | Time | Rank | Time | Rank | Time | Rank |
|---|---|---|---|---|---|---|---|
| Nibal Yamout | Women's 200m Breaststroke | 2:45.35 | 34 | did not advance | | | |
| Nibal Yamout | Women's 200m IM | 2:27.93 | 35 | did not advance | | | |
