= List of Lebanese flags =

The following is a list of flags used in Lebanon. For more information about the national flag, see the article Flag of Lebanon.

== National flag ==
=== Current ===
Flag	Date	Use	Description
	1990–present	National flag and ensign	A horizontal triband of red, white (double height), and red; charged with a green cedar of Lebanon.

=== Historical ===
Flag	Date	Use	Description
	1918–1920	Lebanese flag after the fall of the Ottoman Empire	A white field with the cedar tree in the center.
	1920–1943	Flag of Greater Lebanon during French colonization (1920–1926) and of the Lebanese Republic (1926–1943)	The French tricolor (blue, white, red); charged with a green Lebanese cedar tree with a brown trunk.
	1943–1990	Flag of Lebanon	A horizontal triband of red, white (double height), and red; charged with a green Lebanese cedar tree with a brown trunk.

== Military flags ==
Flag	Date	Use	Description
	1949–present	Flag of the Lebanese Air Force	A blue field with the Air Force's emblem in the center.
	1991–present	Flag of the Lebanese Armed Forces (obverse)	The Lebanese triband with four laurels in each corner and Arabic script on either side of the tree.
	1991–present	Flag of the Lebanese Armed Forces (reverse)	A diagonal bicolor of white and red, with the emblem of the Armed Forces in the center.
	1945–1991	Flag of the Lebanese Armed Forces	The Lebanese triband with Arabic script on either side of the tree.
	1984–present	Flag of the Republican Guard	A blue field with the guard's emblem in the center and the emblem of the Armed Forces in the upper hoist.
	1916–1920	Flag of the Lebanese Troops during WW1	A white field with a red saltire that extends to the corners of the field and a black tree in the center.
	1950–present	Flag of the Lebanese Navy	A white field with the navy's emblem in the center and the emblem of the Armed Forces in the upper hoist.
	1950–present	Naval jack of Lebanon	The Lebanese triband with two vertical white bands along the hoist and fly edges, each with a red anchor.

== Religious groups' flags ==
Flag	Date	Use	Description
	c. 19th – 20th century	Druze flag	
	19th century	Maronite flag	

== Political flags ==
Flag	Date	Use	Description
	2005–2016	Flag of the March 14 Alliance	A red field with a white fist holding a laurel in the center.
	1890–present	Flag of the Armenian Revolutionary Federation in Lebanon	A red field with the ARF emblem in the center.
	1936–present	Flag of the Kataeb Party	A white field with a simplified cedar tree emblem in the center.
	1957–present	Flag of Al-Mourabitoun	A black field with the emblem in the center.
	1974–present	Flag of the Amal Movement	A green field with the emblem slightly off-center and a black triangle and red diagonal stripe in the upper corner of the fly.
	1953–present	Flag of the Lebanese Ba'ath Party	A horizontal tricolor of black, white, and green with a red triangle based on the hoist side.
	1994–present	Flag of the Free Patriotic Movement	An orange field with the emblem in the center.
	1995–present	Flag of the Future Movement	A blue field with a seven-pointed half-sun based on the hoist side.
	1964–present	Flag of the Lebanese Communist Party	A red field with a hammer and sickle in the upper hoist corner and a white vertical band containing the green cedar of Lebanon, the two symbols side by side.
	2001–present	Flag of the Lebanese Democratic Party	A vertical bicolor of white and red with a map of Lebanon in green in the center.
	1973–present	Flag of the Popular Nasserist Organization	A horizontal triband of red, green, and red with the emblem in the center of the green band.
	1949–present	Flag of the Progressive Socialist Party	A red field with the emblem in the center.
	1932–present	Flag of the Lebanese-Syrian Social Nationalist Party	A black field with the emblem in the center.
	1960–present	Flag of the Toilers League	
	1960–present	Flag of the Union Party	A vertical tricolor of black, white, and red with a green cedar in the center of the white band.
	1985–present	Flag of Hezbollah	The flag depicts a stylized representation of the Arabic words حزب الله (ḥizbu-llāh, meaning "Party of Allah") in Kufic script.

== Municipality and district flags ==
Flag	Date	Use	Description
	1943–present	Flag of Deir al-Qamar	A red field with a green cross.
	1943–present	Flag of Beirut	A white field with the municipality's arms in the center.

== See also ==
- Flag of Lebanon
- Coat of arms of Lebanon
