= Lebanon at the 2013 World Aquatics Championships =

- Flag of Lebanon
- FINA code: LIB
- National federation: Federation Libanaise de Natation

in Barcelona, Spain
- Competitors: 3 in 1 sports
- Medals: Gold 0 Silver 0 Bronze 0 Total 0

World Aquatics Championships appearances
- 1973; 1975; 1978; 1982; 1986; 1991; 1994; 1998; 2001; 2003; 2005; 2007; 2009; 2011; 2013; 2015; 2017; 2019; 2022; 2023; 2024

Lebanon is competing at the 2013 World Aquatics Championships in Barcelona, Spain between 19 July and 4 August 2013.

== Swimming ==
Lebanese swimmers achieved qualifying standards in the following events (up to a maximum of 2 swimmers in each event at the A-standard entry time, and 1 at the B-standard):

Men

Athlete	Event	Heat		Semifinal		Final	
Athlete	Event	Time	Rank	Time	Rank	Time	Rank
Wael Koubrousli	50 m breaststroke	30.44	61	did not advance			
Wael Koubrousli	100 m breaststroke	1:06.54	63	did not advance			
Maroun Waked	50 m backstroke	29.31	40	did not advance			
Maroun Waked	100 m backstroke	1:02.23	48	did not advance			

Women

Athlete	Event	Heat		Final	
Athlete	Event	Time	Rank	Time	Rank
Katya Bachrouche	400 m freestyle	4:20.46	27	did not advance	
Katya Bachrouche	800 m freestyle	8:50.08	24	did not advance	
