= Lebanon at the 2022 World Aquatics Championships =

- Flag of Lebanon
- FINA code: LIB
- National federation: Federation Libanaise de Natation

in Budapest, Hungary
- Competitors: 4 in 1 sport
- Medals: Gold 0 Silver 0 Bronze 0 Total 0

World Aquatics Championships appearances
- 1973; 1975; 1978; 1982; 1986; 1991; 1994; 1998; 2001; 2003; 2005; 2007; 2009; 2011; 2013; 2015; 2017; 2019; 2022; 2023; 2024

Lebanon competed at the 2022 World Aquatics Championships in Budapest, Hungary from 17 June to 3 July.

== Swimming ==
Lebanon entered four swimmers.

Men

Athlete	Event	Heat		Semifinal		Final	
Athlete	Event	Time	Rank	Time	Rank	Time	Rank
Munzer Kabbara	200 m medley	2:04.66	29	did not advance			
Munzer Kabbara	400 m medley	4:24.23	23	—		did not advance	
Adib Khalil	400 m freestyle	4:02.64	36	—		did not advance	
Adib Khalil	1500 m freestyle	16:12.11	22	—		did not advance	

Women

Athlete	Event	Heat		Semifinal		Final	
Athlete	Event	Time	Rank	Time	Rank	Time	Rank
Simone Kabbara	200 m medley	2:25.39	34	did not advance			
Simone Kabbara	400 m medley	5:07.33	18	—		did not advance	
Marie Khoury	50 m freestyle	27.40	48	did not advance			
Marie Khoury	50 m backstroke	30.57	28	did not advance			
