= Lebanese Swimming Federation =

Governing body for swimming in Lebanon

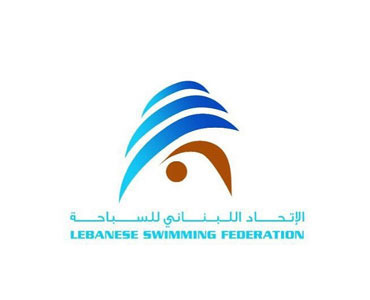
- Sport: Swimming, open water swimming, diving, high diving, water polo and artistic swimming
- Category: Sport
- Abbreviation: LBN
- Founded: 1961; 65 years ago
- Affiliation: World Aquatics
- Affiliation date: 1961
- Regional affiliation: Asia Aquatics
- Headquarters: Jounieh
- Location: Lebanon
- (Lebanon)

The Lebanese Swimming Federation (French: Fédération Libanaise de Natation) is the national governing body of swimming and other aquatic sports in Lebanon. It was founded in 1961. The federation is based in Jounieh.

The federation oversees swimming, open water swimming, diving, high diving, water polo and artistic swimming. It is a member of World Aquatics (formerly FINA), which it joined in 1961, and of Asia Aquatics (formerly the Asia Swimming Federation). Nationally, it is affiliated to the Lebanese Olympic Committee.

== Olympic participation ==
Lebanon's first Olympic swimmer was Yacoub Masboungi, who competed at the 1968 Summer Olympics in Mexico City. The first Lebanese woman to swim at the Olympics was Ani Jane Mugrditchian, at the 1972 Summer Olympics in Munich.

Lebanon has also sent swimmers to every Summer Youth Olympics since the inaugural 2010 Games. At Dakar 2026, Thea Obeid won a silver medal in the girls' 50 m breaststroke, Lebanon's first Youth Olympic swimming medal, and finished fifth in the 100 m breaststroke final.

== Doping ==
In August 2004, Lebanese swimmer Omar Daaboul tested positive in an in-competition control for the anabolic steroids metandienone and methyltestosterone and the steroid metabolite norandrosterone. He received a two-year ban, running until 2006.

== Governance ==
In 2024–2025, the Aquatics Integrity Unit of World Aquatics investigated the federation's leadership over development funding. Secretary general Farid Abi Raad was provisionally suspended in December 2024, and president Toni Nasri Nassar and former treasurer Mhamad Hamdan in February 2025. In March 2025, Abi Raad received a ten-year suspension and a fine of US$50,000, and Nassar a seven-year suspension, for submitting false information and falsified documents to World Aquatics to obtain financial support. Both were barred from holding any position within World Aquatics, its continental organisations or member federations. The reasoned decision against Abi Raad found that funding had been claimed for coaching courses in 2020 and 2021 that did not take place, and that the fine was equivalent to the amount misappropriated.

== See also ==
- Lebanese Swimming at the Olympics
- List of Lebanese records in swimming
