= Coat of arms of Lebanon =

Unofficial emblem

Unofficial coat of arms of Lebanon
- Unofficial coat of arms of Lebanon
- Armiger: Republic of Lebanon
- Adopted: 1943 (not in use until 1990, unofficial)
- Shield: Gules, on a bend sinister argent a cedar tree palewise vert.
- Use: Unofficial

Unofficial emblem of Lebanon
- Armiger: Republic of Lebanon
- Adopted: 1943 (not in use until 1990, unofficial)
- Shield: a Lebanese cedar tree vert.
- Use: Lebanese passport, banknotes, coins, Security Forces

Lebanon never officially adopted a coat of arms or emblem. However, various unofficial coats of arms have been used since the proclamation of independence on 7 December 1943, but were not in any type of use until the flag's modification in 21 September 1990. The main variant consists of a red shield with a white bend sinister on which is placed a cedar tree. It is similar to the flag of Lebanon, with the exception of the Spanish fess on the flag being changed into a bend sinister.

The seals of the Supreme Judicial Council of Lebanon, of the President of the Republic, and of the Republican Guard also feature variants of the unofficial coat of arms.

== Gallery ==
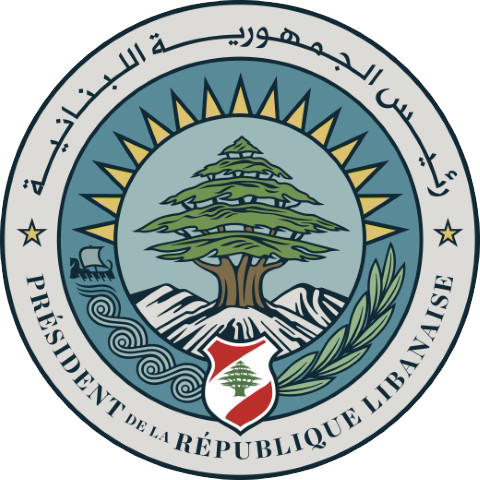
Unofficial coat of arms of Lebanon on the seal of the President of the Republic.

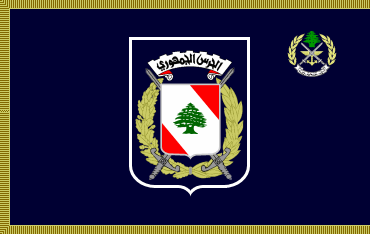
Unofficial coat of arms on the flag of the Republican Guard.

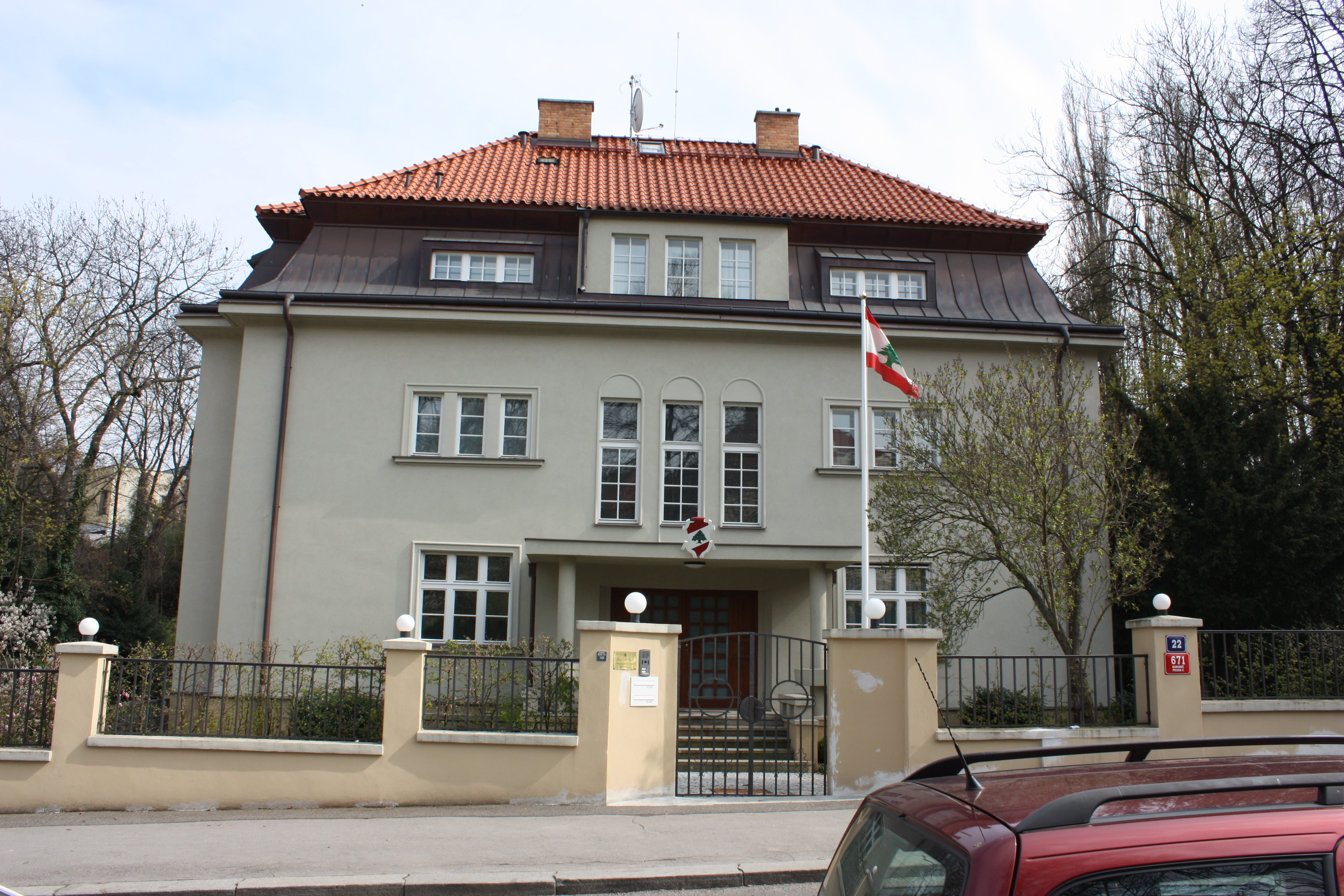
Unofficial coat of arms on the chancery of the Lebanese Embassy in Prague

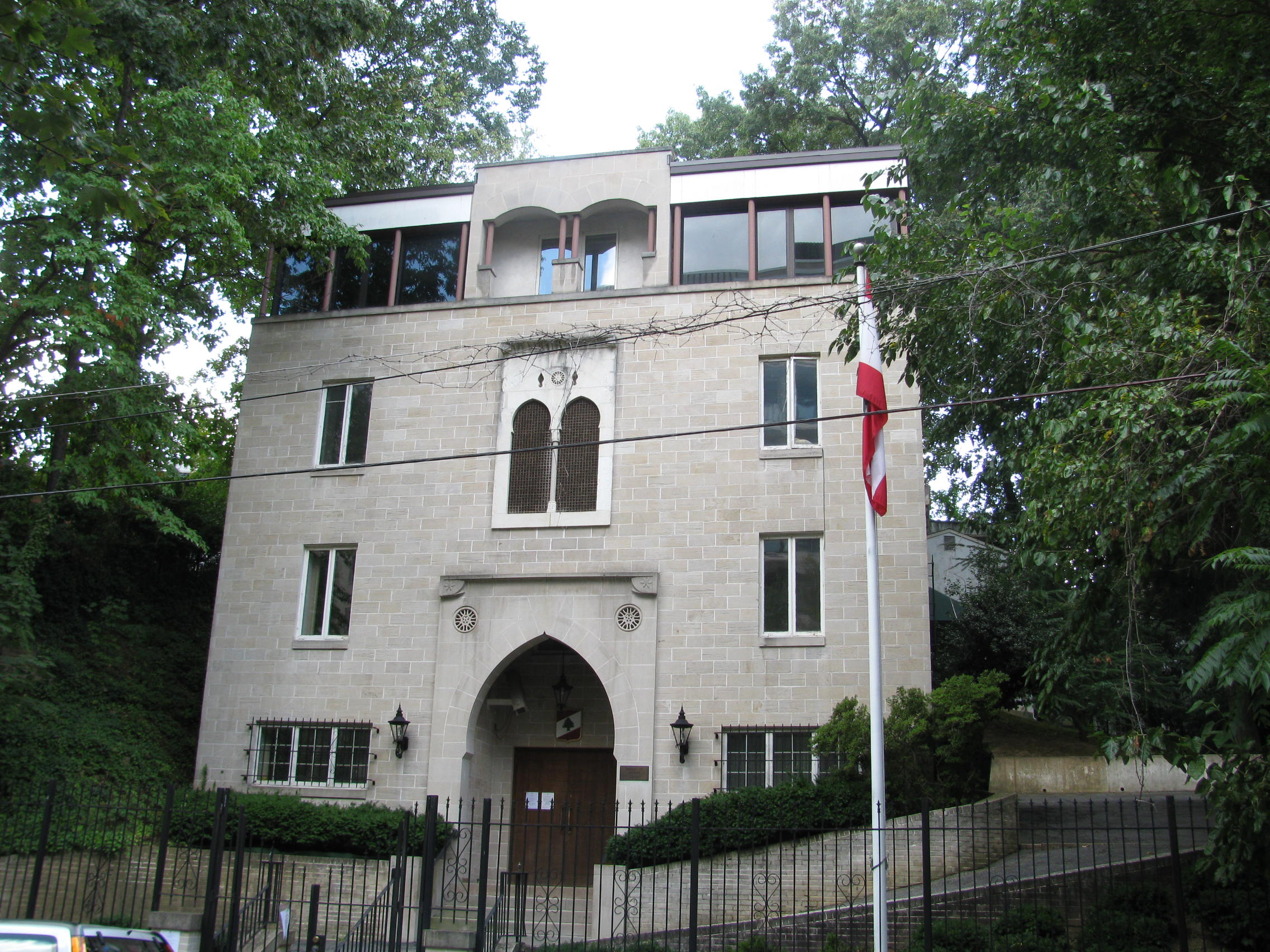
Unofficial coat of arms on the chancery of the Lebanese Embassy in Washington D.C.
