= Ani Jane Mugrditchian =

Lebanese swimmer (born 1953)

Personal information
- Born: 11 May 1953 (age 73)

Sport
- Sport: Swimming

Ani Jane Mugrditchian (born 11 May 1953) is a Lebanese former swimmer. She competed in the women's 100 metre breaststroke at the 1972 Summer Olympics. She was the first woman to represent Lebanon at the Olympics.
