= Adam Allouche =

French-Lebanese swimmer (born 1993)

Adam Alouche
Personal information
- Full name: Adam Allouche
- Nickname: Doudou
- Nationality: Lebanon
- Born: 1993 (age 32–33) Orsay, France
- Height: 1.90 m (6 ft 3 in)
- Weight: 94 kg (207 lb)

Sport
- Sport: Swimming
- Event(s): 50m freestyle, breaststroke and butterfly

Adam Allouche is a French-Lebanese international swimmer that holds 4 Lebanese national records in swimming. Allouche originating from Les Ulis, France, represented Lebanon and Tunisia during: the Mediterranean Games in Mersin, Turkey in 2013, the 12th FINA World Championships 25m in Doha, Qatar in 2014, the 16th FINA World Championships 50m in Kazan, Russia in 2015, the 10th Asian Championships 50m in Tokyo, Japan in 2016, the 13th FINA World Championships 25m in Windsor, Canada in 2016.
