= Nibal Yamout =

Lebanese swimmer (born 1993)

Personal information
- Nationality: Lebanon
- Born: 27 July 1993 (age 32) Beirut, Lebanon
- Height: 1.60 m (5 ft 3 in)
- Weight: 54 kg (119 lb)

Sport
- Sport: Swimming
- Event: Breaststroke

Nibal Yamout (Arabic: نبال يموت; born July 27, 1993, in Beirut) is a Lebanese swimmer, who specialized in breaststroke events. At age fifteen, Yamout became the youngest athlete to represent Lebanon at the 2008 Summer Olympics in Beijing, and competed for the women's 100 m breaststroke event. She swam in the second heat of the event, finishing in fifth place, and forty-fifth overall, with a time of 1:16.17.
