= Katya Bachrouche =

Lebanese-American international swimmer

Personal information
- Full name: Katya Bachrouche
- Nationality: Lebanon
- Born: 1989 (age 36–37) Farmington Hills, Michigan, USA
- Height: 1.83 m (6 ft 0 in)
- Weight: 175 lb (79 kg)

Sport
- Sport: Swimming
- Event: 200, 400, 800m freestyle

Katya Bachrouche is a Lebanese-American swimmer who holds the Lebanese record in seven events. Bachrouche, who is a former six-time, state of Michigan champion and an All-American at the University of Virginia, has represented Lebanon in several international events such as, World University Games, Pan Arab Games, and the 2012 Olympic Games held in London.

== Early life ==
Bachrouche was born and raised in Farmington Hills, Michigan. She attended North Farmington High School in Michigan and holds dual citizenship, both American and Lebanese. She is trilingual, speaking English, the Arabic dialect of Lebanon, and Spanish. In her senior year at UVa, she served as a team captain and ranked second in the 500 free, second in the 1650 free, third in the 1000 free and seventh in the 400 IM.

== Swimming honors ==
=== Senior Year ===
- Finished 10th in the 1650y freestyle and 12th in the 500y freestyle at the 2011 NCAA championships, earning her All-American honors
- Ranked third in the 500 free, fifth in the 1650 free, sixth in the 1000 free and sixth in the 400 IM on Virginia's all-time top times list
- Was an NCAA Academic All-American

=== Junior Year ===
- Made her first appearance at the NCAA Championships, swimming the 500 free, 1650 free and 400 IM
- Placed 19th overall in the 1650 free (16:11.09) and 20th in the 500 free (4:42.88)
- Recorded a 23rd-place finish in the 400 IM (4:13.36) at the national meet
- An All-ACC selection in the 500 free, placing second in the event at the ACC Championships with a time of 4:41.25
- Also finished fifth in the 400 IM (4:13.58) and sixth in the 1650 free (16:17.73) at the conference meet
- Selected to All-ACC Academic Team
- Named to ACC Academic Honor Roll

=== Sophomore Year ===
- Finished fifth in the 500 free (4:44.12 in prelims) at the ACC Championships
- Named to ACC Academic Honor Roll
- Ranks fifth in the 500 free and 10th in the 400 IM on Virginia's all-time top times list

=== Freshman Year ===
- Placed third in the 400 IM at the ACC Championships to earn all-conference honors

=== Pre-college ===
- Six-time All-American
- Division II state record holder in the 500 free
- Four-time state champion
- Earned the school's outstanding athlete award in 2007
- Member of Student Round Table and National Honor Society

== 2011 World University Games ==
Bachrouche finished seventh in the 400-meter freestyle, marking her the first Lebanese to make the finals in that competition.

== 2011 Pan Arab Games ==
In the 200, 400 and 800 freestyle and the 200 IM, Bachrouche won four gold medals. Additionally, she won the bronze medals in the 100 butterfly and 50 freestyle.

== 2012 Olympic Games ==
Bachrouche qualified in three events for the Olympics (200m, 400m, and 800m freestyle) but only participated in one event at the Olympics, the 800 freestyle because she believed she had the best chance to do well due to her best time being 8:44.5, which is well under the Olympic selection time of 8:51.82. She finished in the top 20, placing 19th out of 35 swimmers with a time of 8:35.88, taking nearly 9 seconds off of her personal record while being eliminated in the first round.
