= Marie Khoury =

Lebanese swimmer (born 2001)

Personal information
- Nationality: Lebanese
- Born: 4 May 2001 (age 24)

Sport
- Sport: Swimming

Marie Khoury (Arabic: ماري خوري; born 4 May 2001) is a Lebanese swimmer. She competed in the women's 50 metre freestyle and 50 metre backstroke at the 2019 World Aquatics Championships. She represented Lebanon at the 2022 World Aquatics Championships held in Budapest, Hungary. She competed in the women's 50 metre freestyle and women's 50 metre backstroke events.

She holds the national record for women's 50 metre freestyle.
