= Lynn El Hajj =

Lebanese swimmer

Personal information
- Born: 5 March 2007 (age 19)

Sport
- Country: Lebanon
- Sport: Swimming

Lynn El Hajj (born 5 March 2007) is a Lebanese swimmer who competed for Lebanon at the 2023 World Aquatic Championships.

== Career ==
She represented Lebanon at the 2024 Summer Olympics in Paris, France. El Hajj competed in the women's 100 metre breaststroke, but did not advance after the prelims.

At the 2024 World Short Course Championships in Budapest, El Hajj broke her own national record in the 100 meter breaststroke. At the 2025 Islamic Solidarity Games in Riyadh, Saudi Arabia, El Hajj won third place in the women's 200 meter freestyle and in women's 50m breaststroke.

As of September 2025, El Hajj is a student at the American University of Beirut, where she was awarded the 2025-2026 President's Athletic Scholarship.
