= Gabriella Doueihy =

Lebanese swimmer (born 1999)

Personal information
- Native name: غابرييلا الدويهي
- Full name: Gabriella Doueihy
- Nationality: Lebanese
- Born: 30 April 1999 (age 25); Ehden, Lebanon

Sport
- Sport: Swimming

Gabriella Doueihy (Arabic: غابرييلا الدويهي, born 30 April 1999) is a Lebanese swimmer. She competed in the first round of the women's 400 metre freestyle event at the 2016 Summer Olympics, coming in 31st, and in the first round of the women's 200 metre freestyle event at the 2020 Summer Olympics, finishing 29th. Additionally, Gabriella has competed in six World Championships, including the 2022 FINA World Swimming Championships (25m). Gabriella holds multiple national records in the 400m, 800m, and 1500m freestyle.

== 2016 Summer Olympics ==
Sport	Event	Rank	Time
Swimming	Women's 400m freestyle	31	4:31.21
Swimming	Women's 200m freestyle	29	2:11.29
