= Munzer Kabbara =

Lebanese swimmer (born 2002)

Munzy Kabbara OLY
Personal information
- Full name: Munzer Mark Kabbara
- Nationality: Lebanese, American
- Born: 3 September 2002 (age 24) Houston, Texas, United States
- Height: 6 ft 3 in (1.91 m)
- Weight: 175 lb (79 kg)

Sport
- Sport: Swimming
- College team: Texas A&M
- Coach: Michael Marucci, Jay Holmes

Munzer Mark Kabbara OLY (Arabic: منذر مارك الكبارة; born 3 September 2002) is a Lebanese swimmer. He competed in the men's 200 metre individual medley at the 2020 Summer Olympics. He represented Lebanon at the 2022 World Aquatics Championships held in Budapest, Hungary. He swims collegiately for the Texas A&M Aggies.
