= Flag of Lebanon =

Lebanese Republic
- Use: National flag and ensign
- Proportion: 2:3
- Adopted: 7 December 1943; 82 years ago (introduction into the Constitution of Lebanon); 21 September 1990; 36 years ago (cedar standardized to entirely green)
- Design: A horizontal triband of red, white (double width) and red; charged with a green cedar tree.
- Designed by: Henri Pharaon

The national flag of Lebanon (Arabic: العلم الوطني للجمهورية اللبنانية) is a horizontal triband of two red stripes enveloping a central white stripe which is twice the height of each red stripe. Centered on the white stripe is a green cedar of Lebanon tree (Cedrus libani), touching both red stripes. The flag was adopted on 7 December 1943, shortly before Lebanon gained independence from France. The flag's origins trace back to the early 20th century, with the cedar tree becoming a prominent symbol during the French mandate period. The current design was finalized during a tense political climate in 1943, when Lebanon unilaterally abolished the French mandate. The flag was formally introduced into the Lebanese Constitution on 7 December 1943, with its design standardized in 1990 to feature an entirely green cedar tree. In 1979, 21 November was declared as National Flag Day to honor the first flag-raising in 1943.

== Design ==
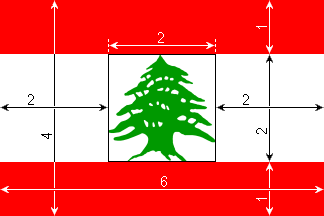
Construction sheet

According to the Article 5 of the Constitution of Lebanon, adopted on 7 December 1943: "The Lebanese flag shall be composed of three horizontal stripes, a white stripe between two red ones. The width of the white stripe shall be equal to that of both red stripes. In the center of and occupying one third of the white stripe is a green Cedar tree with its top touching the upper red stripe and its base touching the lower red stripe."

The constitution does not provide any additional color and design specifications, and before the amendment of the constitution on 21 September 1990, it also did not specify the color of the cedar tree, leading to variations in practice. Traditionally, as long as the essential colors and symbols are present, artistic interpretations are acceptable. Before 1990 the cedar tree on the Lebanese flag was commonly depicted with a brown trunk; similar brown-trunk variants were registered by the World Intellectual Property Organization (WIPO) and on official postcards of United Nations with member state flags. The 1990 amendment specified that the entire cedar tree must be green. (Note: "Dr. Whitney Smith reports that Lebanon has issued new design specifications for its national flag that effectively change the flag. The new specs detail that the entire tree be shown in green, eliminating the brown trunk and making it green. Speculation at the 16th FlAV meeting in Warsaw centered around the possibility that the old design may have been too closely associated with one faction in the old civil war. The new design could be viewed as a more neutral design to appease all sides.")

== Symbolism ==
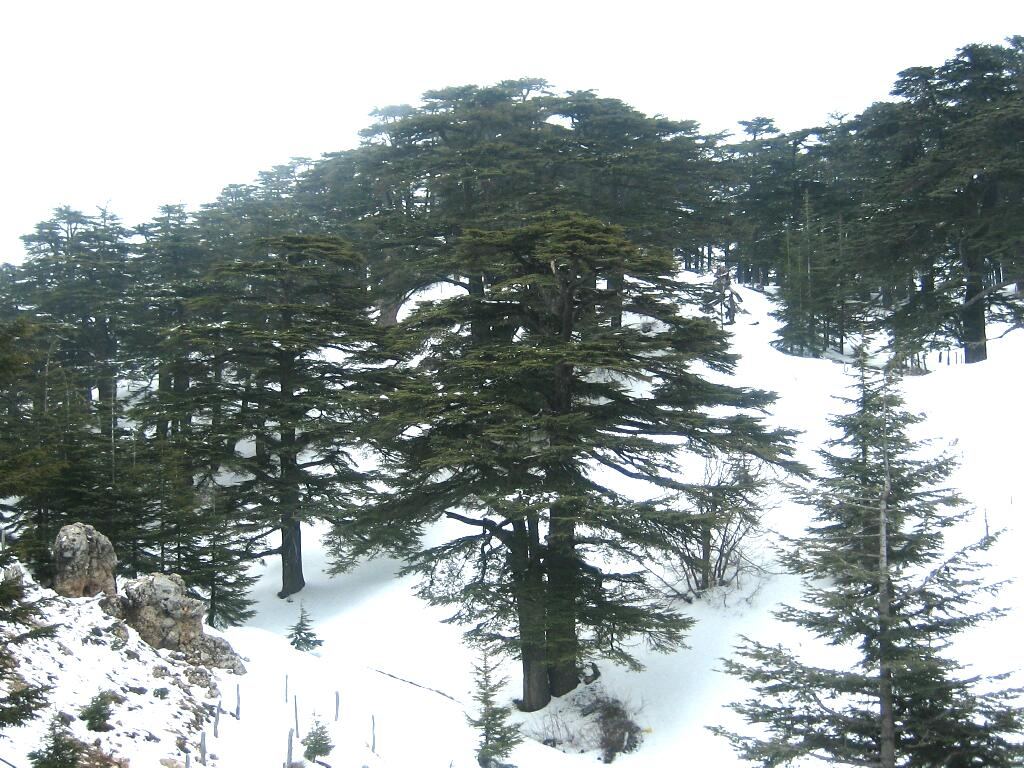
Cedrus libani in the Cedars of God forest

The cedar of Lebanon holds a prominent place in history and religious texts. It is mentioned 103 times in the Bible, often symbolizing the glory of strength, majesty, and divine blessing. In Psalms 92:12, it is written, "[t]he righteous will flourish like a palm tree, they will grow like a cedar of Lebanon", and in Psalms 104:16, "[t]he trees of the Lord are well watered, the cedars of Lebanon that he planted". The cedar's wood, known for its durability and resistance to pests, was used to build sacred structures, including Solomon's Temple in Jerusalem. The cedar forest is featured in the Epic of Gilgamesh as a divine and guarded grove. Ancient Egyptians particularly valued Lebanese cedar, using its resin in mummification processes and its wood in shipbuilding and ceremonial barges, as evidenced by cedar planks found near the Great Pyramid of Giza.

The cedar has inspired writers, poets, and political leaders. The French author and statesman Alphonse de Lamartine, marveling at the cedars during his trip to Lebanon in 1832, wrote, "[t]he cedars of Lebanon are the relics of centuries and nature, the most famous natural landmarks in the universe." Similarly, the French writer and aviator Antoine de Saint-Exupéry, who visited Lebanon in 1935, reflected on the cedar's symbolism in his work Citadelle: "[t]he peace is a long-growing tree. We need, as the cedar, to rock its unity." In 1920, during the proclamation of the State of Greater Lebanon, the cedar was described as a symbol of resilience and unity: "[a]n evergreen cedar is like a young nation despite a cruel past. Although oppressed, never conquered, the cedar is its rallying. By the union, it will break all attacks."

Writing in 1926, the Lebanese-born Jesuit Pierre Raphaël emphasized the cedar's role as a unifying national symbol during the French Mandate period, when the flag featured a cedar on a French tricolor background. He described the cedar as "a witness of the past, present and future," calling for all Lebanese to 'hold it high' as a symbol of national pride worthy of ultimate sacrifice. While interpreting the French-inspired flag symbolism in a Lebanese context, he associated the blue with the Phoenician maritime legacy and 'the horizon of peace and heaven of liberty,' the white with Lebanon's snow-capped mountains and principles of justice and faith, and the red with both Phoenician purple and ancestral bloodshed for traditions.

Interpretations of the current flag's colors vary. Some accounts link the red and white to the historical conflict between the Qaysi and Yamani factions, with red representing the Qaysi and white the Yamani. The combination of these colors with the cedar is seen as a resolution of Lebanon's divisions and a symbol of national unity. Vexillologist Whitney Smith, in Flags and Arms Across the World, supports this interpretation. (Note: "The red and white colors are those associated, respectively, with the Kayssites and Yemenites, opposing clans that divided Lebanese society between 634 and 1711.") Broader symbolism associates white with the snowcap of the Lebanon mountains, purity, peace, and spiritual authority; red with sacrifice and strength, and green with hope and renewal. The green cedar stands for immortality, steadfastness, and hope, serving as a unifying national symbol. For Christians, green represents hope, while in Islamic tradition, it signifies salvation.

== Protocol ==
The protocol governing the use and display of the flag of Lebanon is outlined in Decree No. 4081, originally issued on 2 August 1944 and amended twice: first on 12 June 1959 during the presidency of Fouad Chehab, and again on 14 October 2000 under President Émile Lahoud. The 2000 amendment was prompted by the absence of unified standards for state ceremonies and protocols. This decree, rooted in the Lebanese Constitution and informed by earlier decrees related to state protocol and the organization of the Ministry of Foreign Affairs, establishes specific guidelines for the flag's display in official, diplomatic, and ceremonial contexts. In 2019, a proposal was introduced to further amend the protocols, with the intention of implementing the updates in 2020. Further changes to state protocol were proposed in 2019 but had not been formally implemented by 2025.

=== Display ===
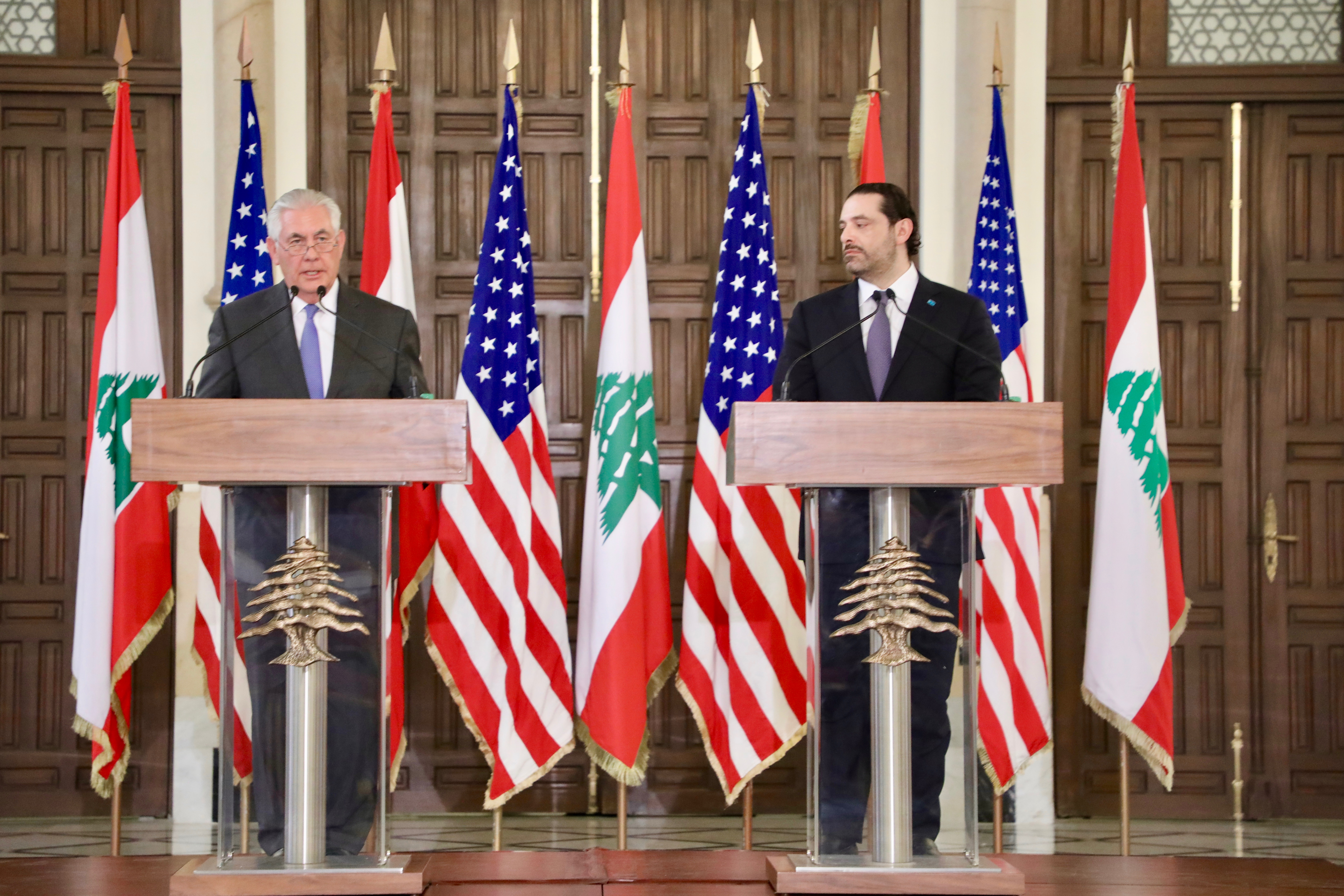
Lebanese Prime Minister Saad Hariri and U.S. Secretary of State Rex Tillerson hold a joint press conference at the Grand Serail in Beirut, on February 15, 2018

The Lebanese flag is prominently displayed in the offices of the President, the Speaker of Parliament, the Prime Minister, and Lebanese ambassadors abroad, with a large flagpole placed to the right of the desk in these offices. A portrait of the President featuring the flag is also displayed in the offices of high-ranking officials, meeting halls of ministries, embassies, consulates, public institutions, and security agencies. The flag is raised daily from sunrise to sunset on all official government buildings, border stations, airports, and seaports, and remains raised day and night at the Presidential Palace while the President is in Lebanon. It is displayed on the right side of the President's vehicle and the front right side of the vehicles of the Speaker of Parliament and the Prime Minister. The display of faded or torn flags is prohibited, and the flag is flown at half-mast during periods of mourning, as directed by the Prime Minister's Office.

When displayed alongside foreign flags, the Lebanese flag takes precedence. It is positioned in the center when raised with multiple foreign flags within Lebanon. During official visits by foreign heads of state, their national flag is displayed at the reception venue and their residence, with the Lebanese flag to its left. On vehicles, the foreign flag is displayed on the right side, while the Lebanese flag is displayed on the left. No foreign flag may be displayed above the Lebanese flag.

=== Ceremonial use ===
The flag plays a central role in state ceremonies and official visits. During the presentation of credentials by a new ambassador, the flag of the ambassador's country is raised to the right of the Lebanese flag in the courtyard of the Presidential Palace. The ambassador is escorted in a motorcade with their national flag on the right side of the vehicle and the Lebanese flag on the left. Upon arrival, the ambassador is greeted with military honors, and the national anthems of both countries are played. The flag is also draped over the coffins of deceased high-ranking officials, including former presidents, during state funerals. The funeral processions, accompanied by military honors, feature the flag prominently as a symbol of national mourning and respect.

During state visits, the Lebanese flag and the flag of the visiting dignitary's country are displayed prominently at the arrival venue and along the motorcade route. The visiting dignitary is greeted with a 21-gun salute and a military guard of honour. The national anthems of both countries are played, and the dignitary inspects the guard of honor, pausing to bow before the Lebanese flag as a sign of respect. The flag is also used to adorn the venue for official receptions and state dinners hosted in honor of the visiting dignitary.

== History ==
The cedar tree has long been a symbol of Lebanon, with its roots tracing back to the 18th century when it became emblematic of the Maronites, an Eastern Catholic community originating from the Levant. (Note: "In the eighteenth and nineteenth centuries Maronite Christians in Lebanon used a white flag bearing a cedar.") The first recorded use of the Maronite flag – a white field charged with a green cedar tree – was in October 1848, reflecting the cedar's growing significance as a national symbol.

=== Early national consciousness (1907–1913) ===
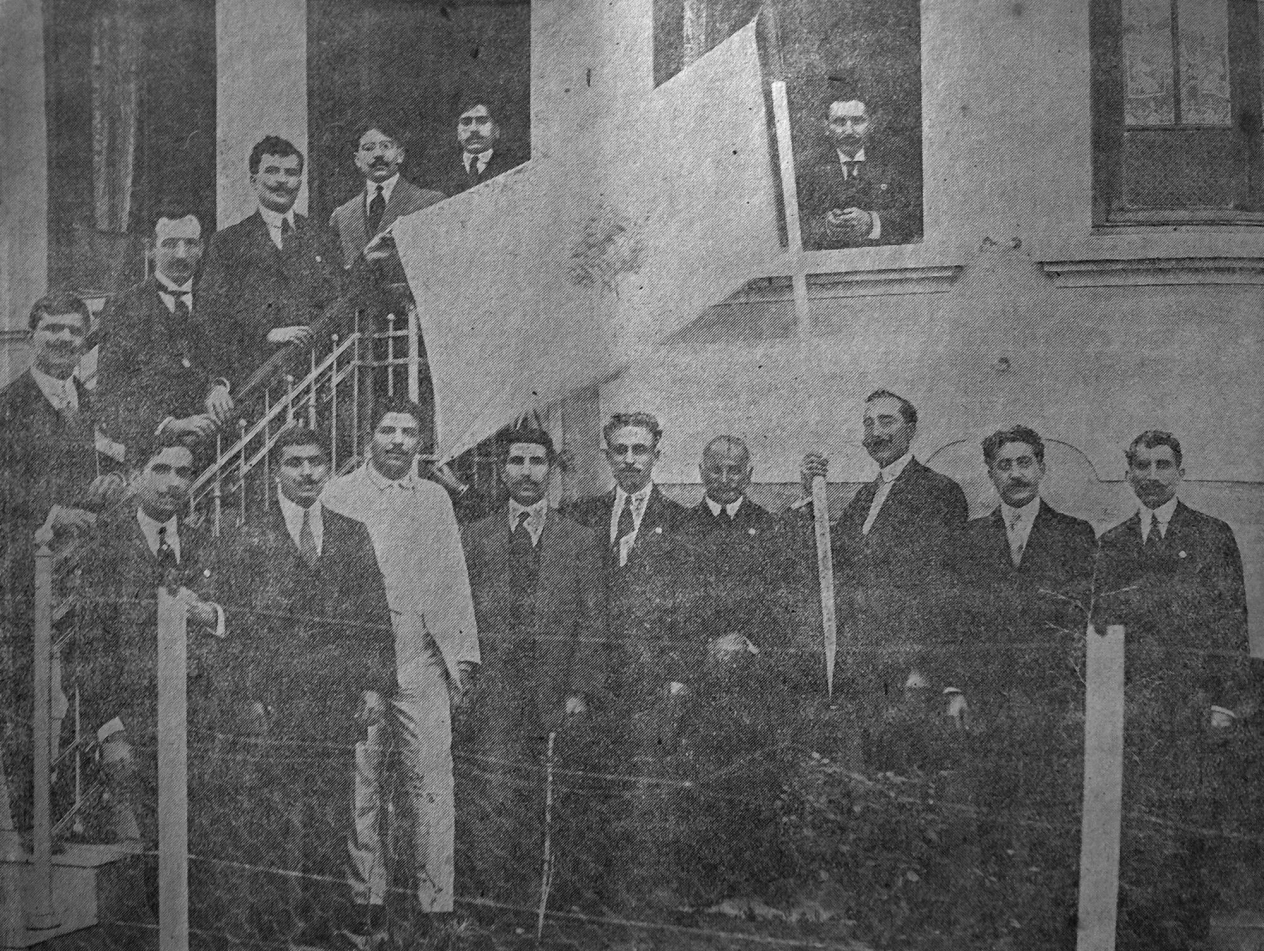
Executive Committee of the Lebanon League of Progress in São Paulo. Shukri El Khoury is in the window while Shukri Bakhash is in the front row, second from right (1914).

The development of a Lebanese flag emerged from growing national consciousness in the early 20th century. At this point in history, Mount Lebanon was a semi-autonomous district (Mutasarrifate) under the Ottoman Empire. Local councils such as the Administrative Council of Mount Lebanon were pushing for more autonomy and recognition of the unique sociopolitical and religious identity of Mount Lebanon's primarily Christian population, particularly the Maronites. In Mount Lebanon, members of the Administrative Council began pursuing a "Lebanese policy" to achieve greater sovereignty of the Mount Lebanon Mutasarrifate within the Ottoman Empire.

In 1907, Shukri El Khoury, a Lebanese Brazilian journalist, proposed in "Les Trésors cachés du Liban" that Lebanon could add a cedar branch to the Ottoman flag as recognition of Lebanese privileges. The Committee for the Defense of Lebanese Interests emphasized Lebanon's "distinct personality" from Syria, citing centuries of historical privileges that neither Arab invasion nor Turkish domination could eliminate. In 1913, El Khoury, publishing from Brazil in his journal Le Sphynge, proposed a white flag with a central cedar, which was adopted by Lebanese emigrants in America and consequently presented to Allied Powers representatives.

=== Post-Ottoman period and French Mandate (1918–1943) ===
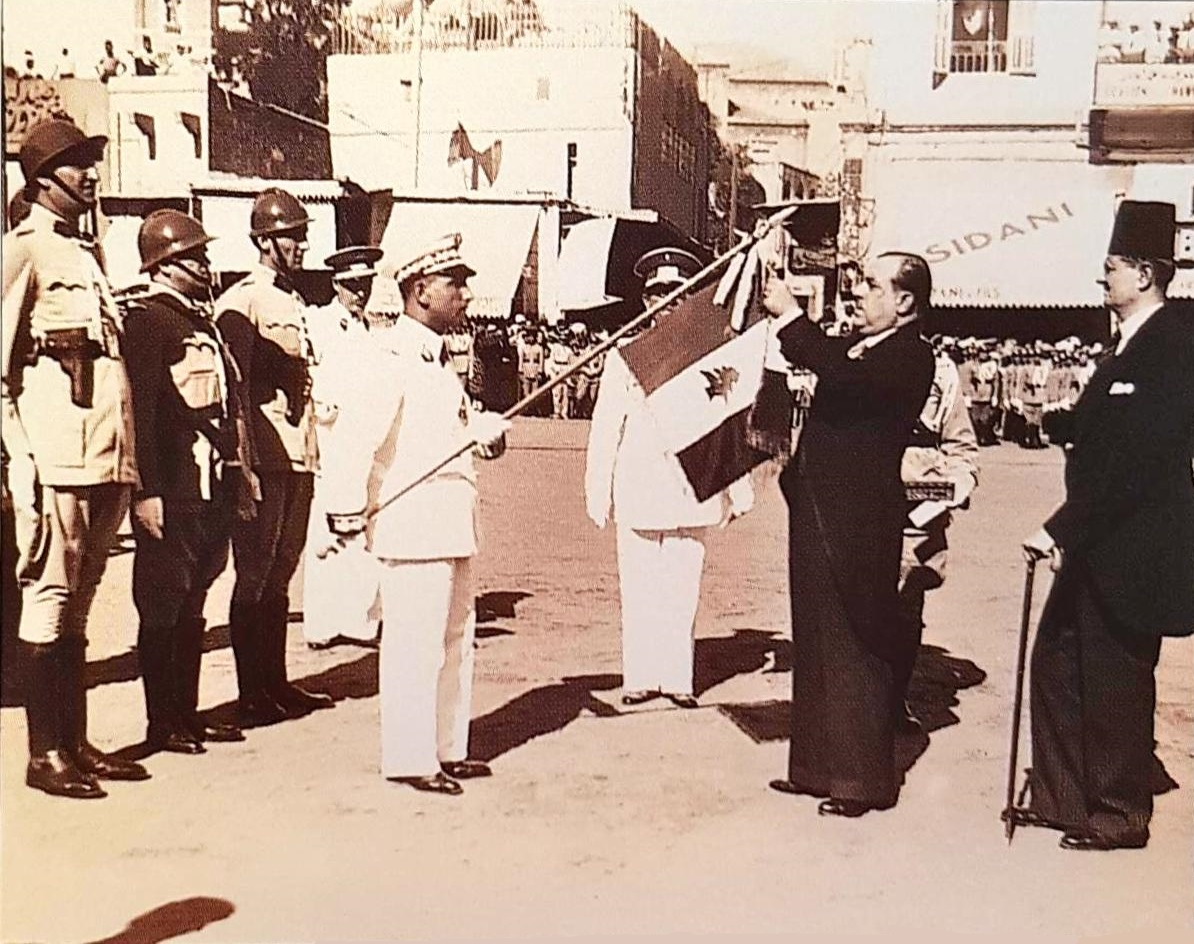
Lebanese president Émile Eddé and prime minister Khaled Chehab during an official celebration at the Martyrs' Square, Beirut (1938)

When World War I ended in 1918, the Ottoman Empire collapsed, creating a power vacuum in the Levant. Allied Powers, notably France and Britain, established mandates over former Ottoman territories in accordance to the Sykes–Picot Agreement. Lebanon fell under the French Mandate, fueling debates among Lebanese communities: some advocated complete independence, others favored strong ties to France based on historical and religious connections, while some advocated for a union with Syria – a position considered extreme by some.

Moreover, the political spectrum in Lebanon during this period was broad, with significant portions of the population holding differing views. Most Lebanese Muslims, along with members of the Druze and Greek Orthodox communities, generally retained a commitment to Arab unity in some form. Many acknowledged Lebanon's unique role in the Arab world, shaped by its confessional diversity, commercial importance, and relatively small size.

In the aftermath of the Allied victory in 1918, Shukri El Khoury modified his 1913 proposal, incorporating elements of the French tricolor by adding red and blue triangles on the left side of the white flag with a central cedar. In an editorial, he described the cedar as making the flag's beauty "more radiant," with the new colors borrowed from the French tricolor representing Lebanon's attachment to France as its "liberator and zealous guardian of independence". On the other hand, Rachid Nakhle, a poet and journalist, recorded that the plain white flag with a green cedar flew at the Seraglio of Baabda, then capital of the autonomous Ottoman Mount Lebanon Mutasarrifate, from 2 November 1918 until May 1919.

Lebanese communities abroad, influenced by the shifting global political landscape and diplomatic pressures, adopted the French flag's colors. By July 1919, French Consul Jean Brillouin in Santiago de Cuba reported to the French Foreign Minister Stephen Pichon that Lebanese communities there were advocating for a French protectorate over Lebanon, separate from Syria, and proposed a national flag consisting of the French flag with a central cedar. The same design was adopted by the Lebanese community in Sydney as of November 1918.

In May 1919, Naoum Mokarzel, the New York-based owner of al-Hoda newspaper and president of the Lebanese League of Progress, wrote to Patriarch Elias Peter Hoayek, head of the second Lebanese delegation to the Paris Peace Conference, assuring him that "the goal of the majority of Lebanese outside Lebanon is the independence of Lebanon within its ancient natural and historical borders with a national flag." Moukarzel later specified that "the Lebanese flag will be of the same colors as the French flag with emblematic cedar on the white...". Later that year, in October 1919, the Lebanese delegation, led by Maronite Patriarch Hoayek, presented their aspirations for independence in a memorandum to the Paris Peace Conference. During the conference, Mokarzel proposed the tricolor flag to French President Raymond Poincaré, who enthusiastically embraced the idea. The design later became the official flag of Lebanon under the League of Nations.

The choice of the French tricolor with a cedar faced opposition in Lebanon. In May 1919, Lebanese Christians, feeling threatened by a Hashemite takeover, intensified advocacy for independence. Emir Faisal (later Faisal I of Iraq) was a member of the Hashemite family – leaders of the Arab Revolt against the Ottomans during World War I. He was supported by the British and sought to establish an Arab kingdom encompassing Syria (including modern-day Lebanon). The Administrative Council of Mount Lebanon, municipalities, and Maronite clergy protested the plan, and led a movement, displaying the white flag with a cedar to symbolize their desire for a distinct Lebanese identity, and the creation of an independent Greater Lebanon. This shift reflected growing anxiety over France's perceived hesitation to support Lebanon's nationalists.

On 4 June, crowds protested in front the Seraglio of Baabda against the rapprochement between Faisal and the French. Christian crowds chanted anti-French slogans and flew a flag with a cedar on a white background. A French official intervened to remove the flag to avoid incidents, and the Lebanese press was consequently censored. French priorities did not appear to correspond to those of the Lebanese nationalists, and François Georges-Picot, a French diplomat who negotiated the Sykes-Picot Agreement to partition the Ottoman Empire, declared: "If the Lebanese want complete independence, let them stop demanding Greater Lebanon and be content with Little Lebanon." The white cedar flag was especially flown in the Batroun and Keserwan districts, regions with strong Maronite communities that had previously supported French annexation or protectorate but now sought greater independence.

On 8 March 1920, the Syrian National Congress in Damascus declared Syria's independence within its natural borders, while also recognizing Lebanese national aspirations for independence within its existing borders, on the condition that Lebanon remains free from foreign influence. The Congress also crowned Faisal King of Syria, a short-lived monarchy that further alarmed Lebanese Christian communities. This proclamation led many Lebanese to believe that France was aligning with Emir Faisal and potentially abandoning its support for Lebanese independence, heightening tensions and mistrust between the Lebanese and the French authorities.

In this uncertain situation, and to address the growing mistrust between the Lebanese population and France, the Administrative Council, in coordination with the French authorities, decided to take action. On 22 March 1920, a demonstration to counter the Syrian Congress of Damascus was organized in the seraglio of Baabda, where demonstrators raised the cedar-bearing tricolor flag featuring a cedar tree demanding "the affirmation of the union of Lebanon with France, consecrated by the choice, as a national emblem, of the tricolor flag with the Cedar in a white band."

This flag was officially adopted on 23 May 1926, as described in Article 5 of the Lebanese Constitution: "The Lebanese flag is blue, white, and red in vertical bands of equal width, with a cedar on the white part." Although the constitution did not specify the cedar's color, most contemporary depictions showed it as green with a brown trunk.

Flag used by Lebanese Maronites in the 19th century, and first raised as a Lebanese flag in 1918 (1918–1920)

Flag used by Lebanese Maronites in the 19th century, and first raised as a Lebanese flag in 1918 (1918–1920; variant)

Shukri El Khoury's proposed flag featuring red and blue triangles added to honor the French mandate (1918)

Flag of the State of Greater Lebanon during the French mandate (1920–1943)

Flag of the State of Greater Lebanon during the French mandate (1920–1943; variant)

=== Republic of Lebanon (1943–present) ===
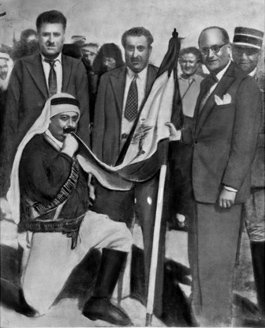
Emir Majid Arslan, left, kissing the new flag of Lebanon, and Sabri Hamadeh on the right (1943)

During World War II, Vichy French authorities allowed Germany to move aircraft and supplies through Syria and Lebanon. In response, British troops moved into the region, and by late 1941, the Free French government supported Lebanese independence. Elections were held in 1943, and in November of that year, the newly formed Lebanese government unilaterally abolished the French mandate. In reaction, French authorities briefly imprisoned key government leaders, including President Bechara El Khoury, Prime Minister Riad Al Solh, and several ministers. Under international pressure, France eventually agreed to Lebanon's independence weeks later.

The Lebanese flag emerged during this period of political tension. Accounts of the flag's creation vary, with different figures claiming credit for its design. On 11 November 1943, seven members of parliament managed to meet in the French-occupied Parliament and hastily devised a colored version of the flag, preserving the cedar as a national symbol. The flag was formally introduced into the Lebanese Constitution on 7 December 1943, with its composition specified as three horizontal stripes (red, white, and red) and a cedar tree occupying one-third of the white stripe.

Henri Pharaon, a member of parliament, claimed that he proposed the flag's design. According to Pharaon, the Muslim elected officials initially proposed four colors – green, white, red, and black – based on the pan-Arab colors, while the Christian representatives demanded a single color with the cedar in the center. Drawing on his Austrian connections as a former consul for the Austro-Hungarian Empire and founder of the Austro-Lebanese Friendship Association, Pharaon suggested using the Austrian flag as a model, with its red and white horizontal stripes, and placing a green cedar tree in the center. This proposal was reportedly assisted by Saadi Al Munla and Mohamad Al Fadl. The original drawing of the flag, signed by the seven parliament members, was executed by Al Munla. The seven MPs – Maroun Kanaan, Mohamad Al Fadl, Rachid Baydoun, Sabri Hamadeh, Henri Pharaon, Saadi Al Munla, and Saeb Salam – entered Parliament despite the French blockade, finalized the design with colored pencils, and adopted it as the national flag. Ten days later, Lebanon achieved independence.

Pierre Gemayel, leader of the Kataeb Party, offered a different account. He asserted that his party conceived the flag's design, which was later adopted by the government. According to Gemayel, on the morning of 11 November 1943, he presented a drawing of the new flag to members of parliament and urged them to formally adopt it. Gemayel reportedly consulted Maurice Chehab, director of antiquities of Lebanon, who advised that the flag's design should reflect Lebanon's traditions. Chehab suggested combining the colors red and white, representing the historical conflict between the Qaysi and Yamani factions, with the cedar tree as a unifying national symbol. Gemayel also enlisted Sami Dahdah to draw the new flag, which was then sewn by the wife of Felix Hobeyka.

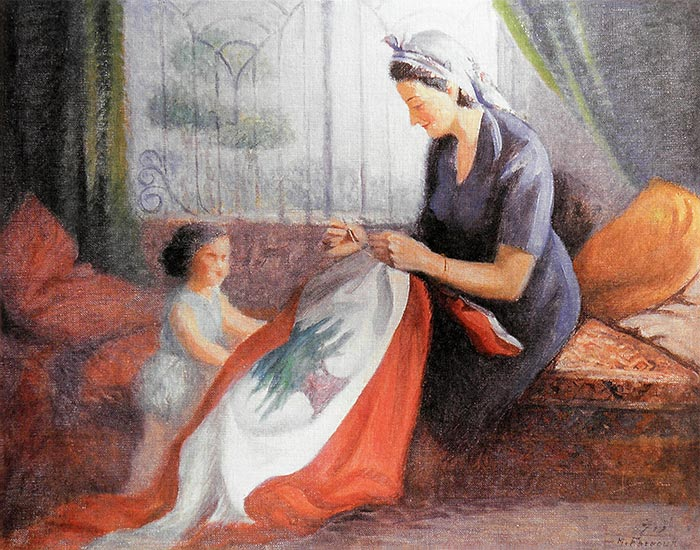
A Mother Sewing the Flag in Front of Her Daughter by Moustafa Farroukh (c. 1950–1951)

The Lebanese flag was first raised in Bechamoun on 21 November 1943 at 11:20 pm. In 1979, the Minister of National Education, Boutros Harb, declared 21 November as National Flag Day.

From 1943 to 1990, the cedar tree on the flag was depicted naturalistically with a brown trunk, as seen in versions registered with the WIPO and on official postcards of the United Nations. On 21 September 1990, the Lebanese government standardized the cedar's color to entirely green, replacing the earlier depiction. Discussions at the 16th FIAV meeting in Warsaw suggested that the previous design had become too strongly linked to the Lebanese Forces, a faction from the Lebanese Civil War.

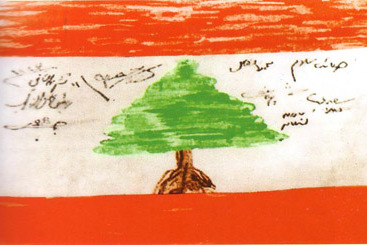
Flag as drawn and approved by the members of the parliament during the declaration of independence (1943)

Flag of Lebanon (1943–1990)

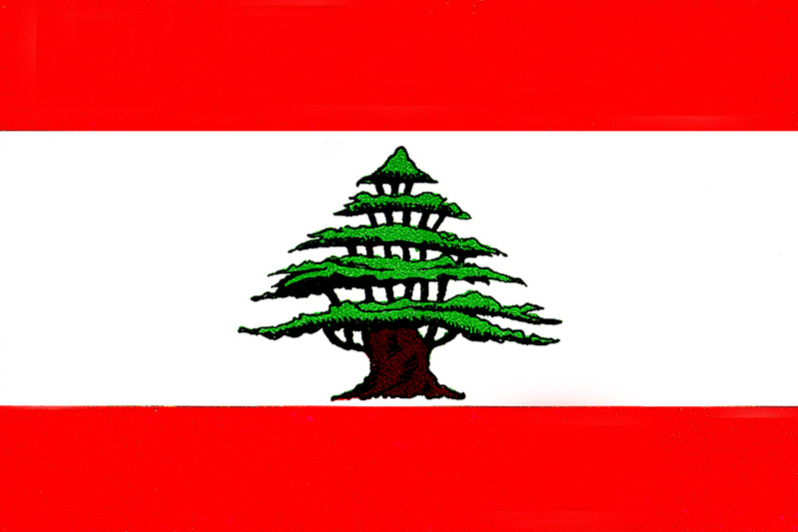
Design stored at WIPO (1943–1990)

Flag of Lebanon (1990–present)

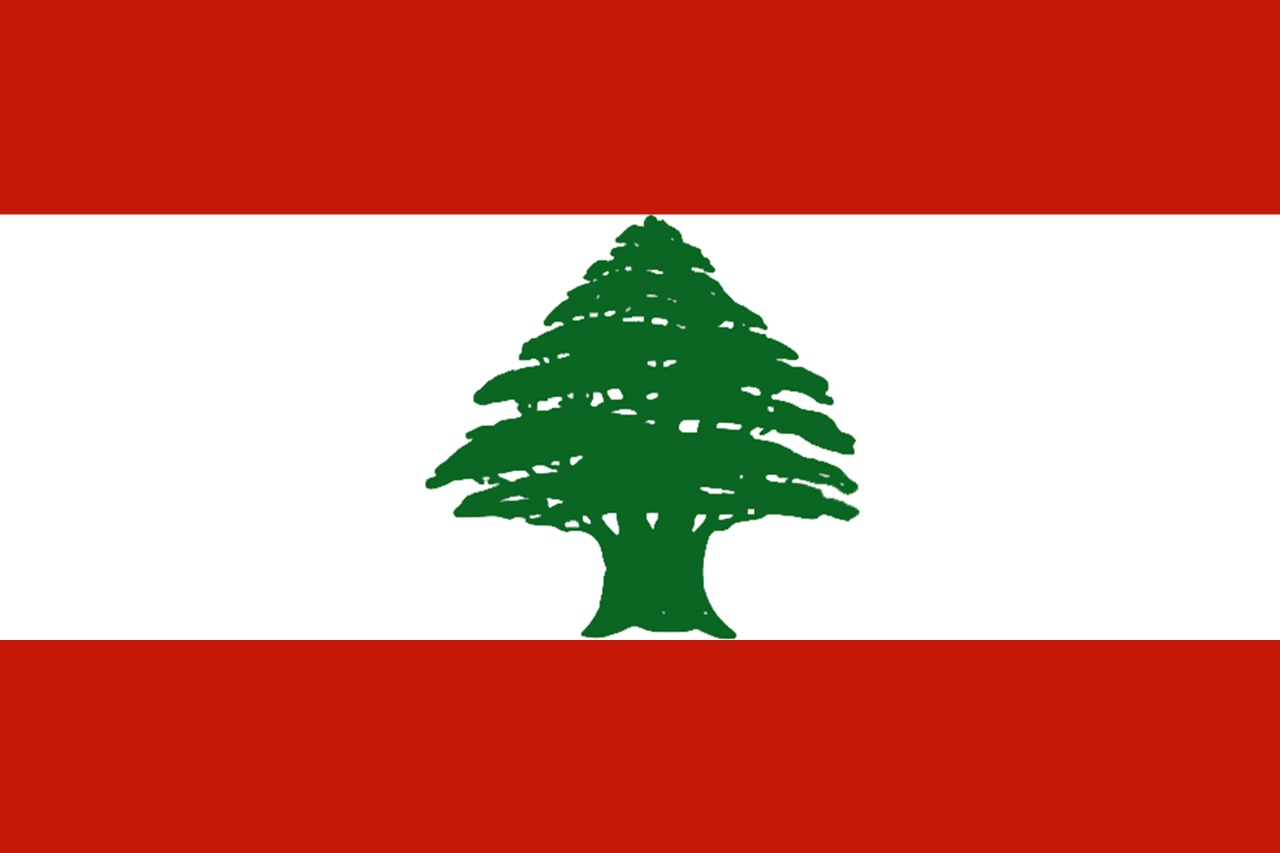
Common variant of the flag of Lebanon (1990–present)

Vertical flag of Lebanon

== Gallery ==
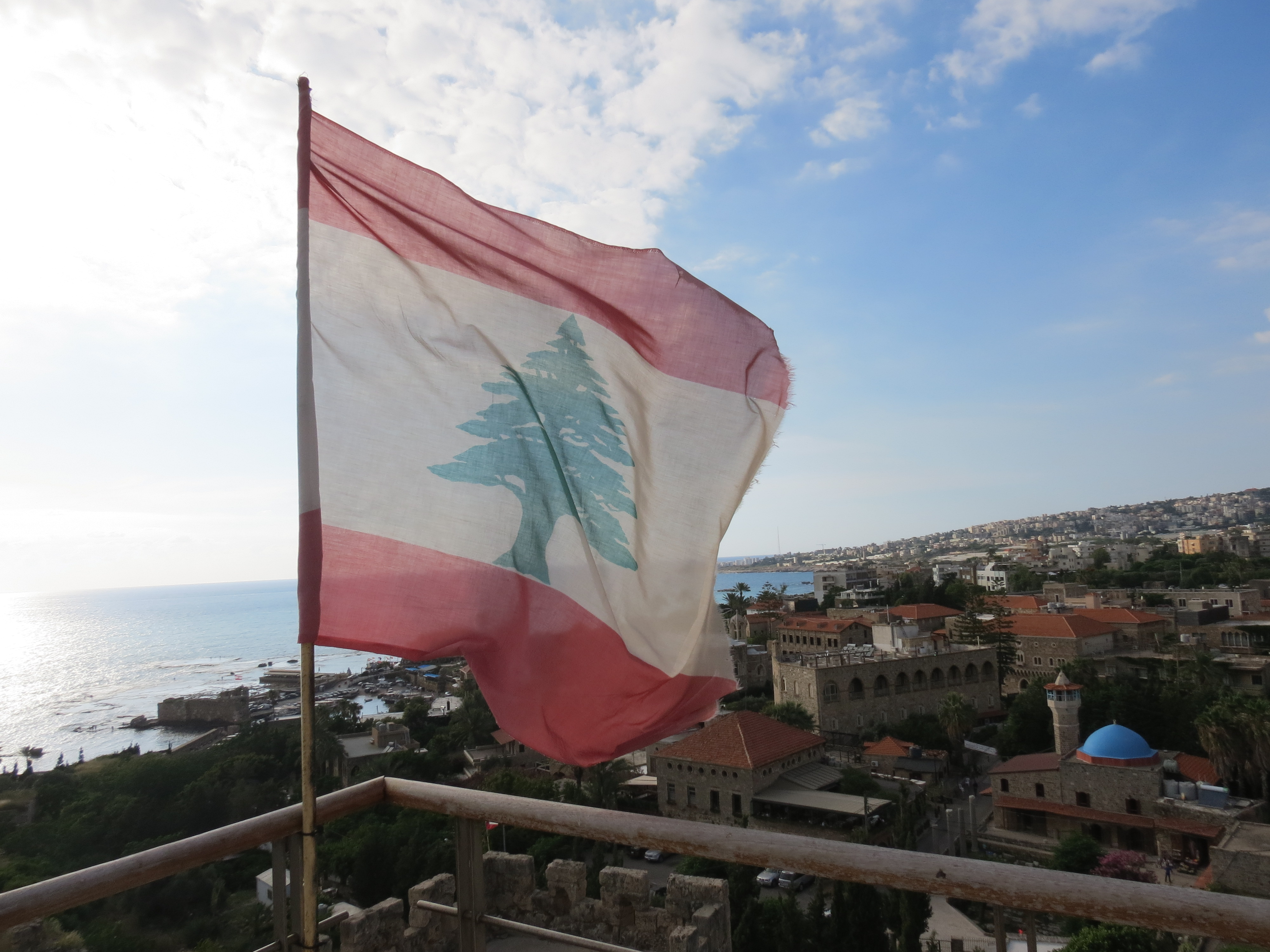
Lebanese flag flying over Byblos Castle, overlooking the city

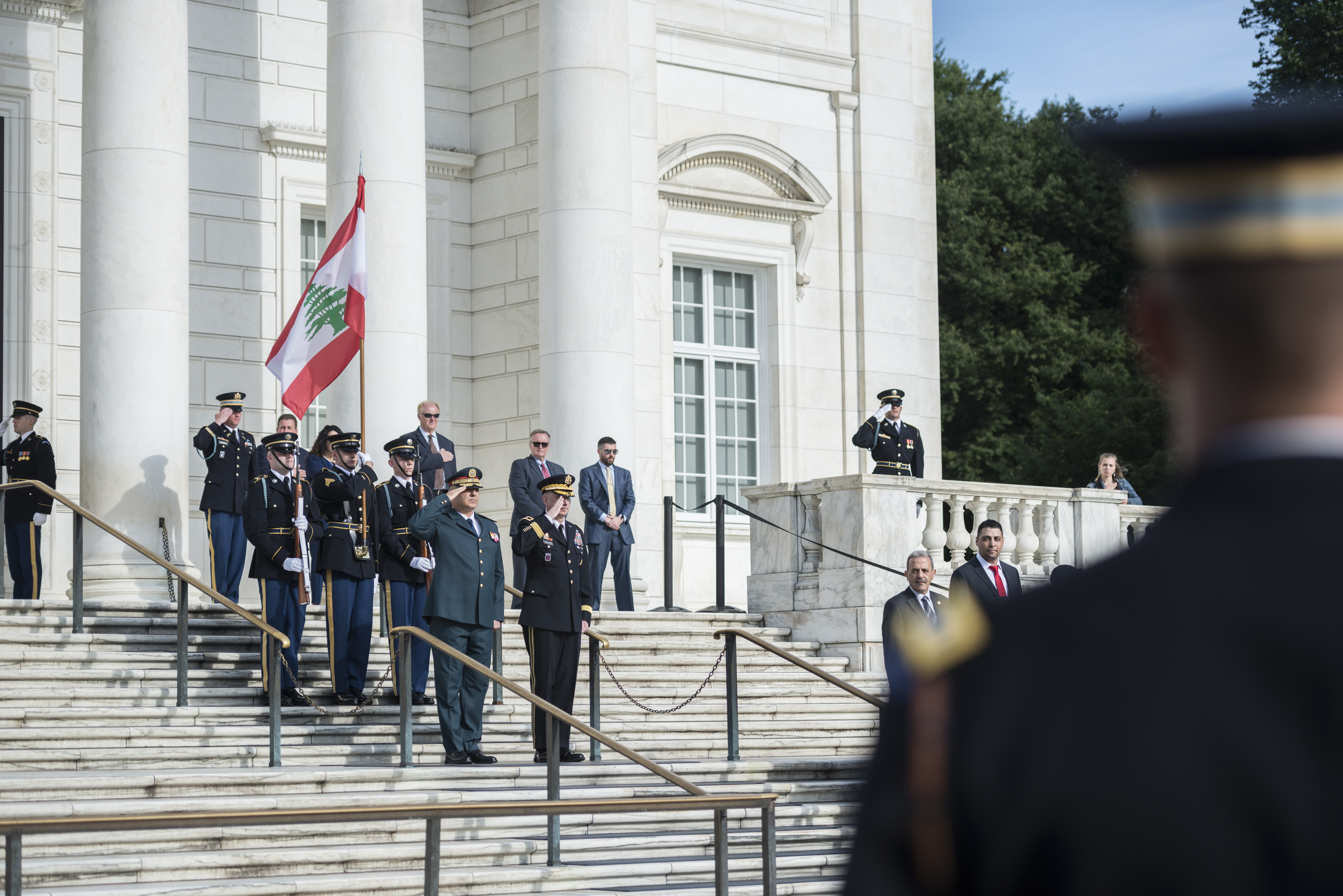
Flag of Lebanon flown during General Joseph Aoun's 2018 wreath-laying at the Tomb of the Unknown Soldier

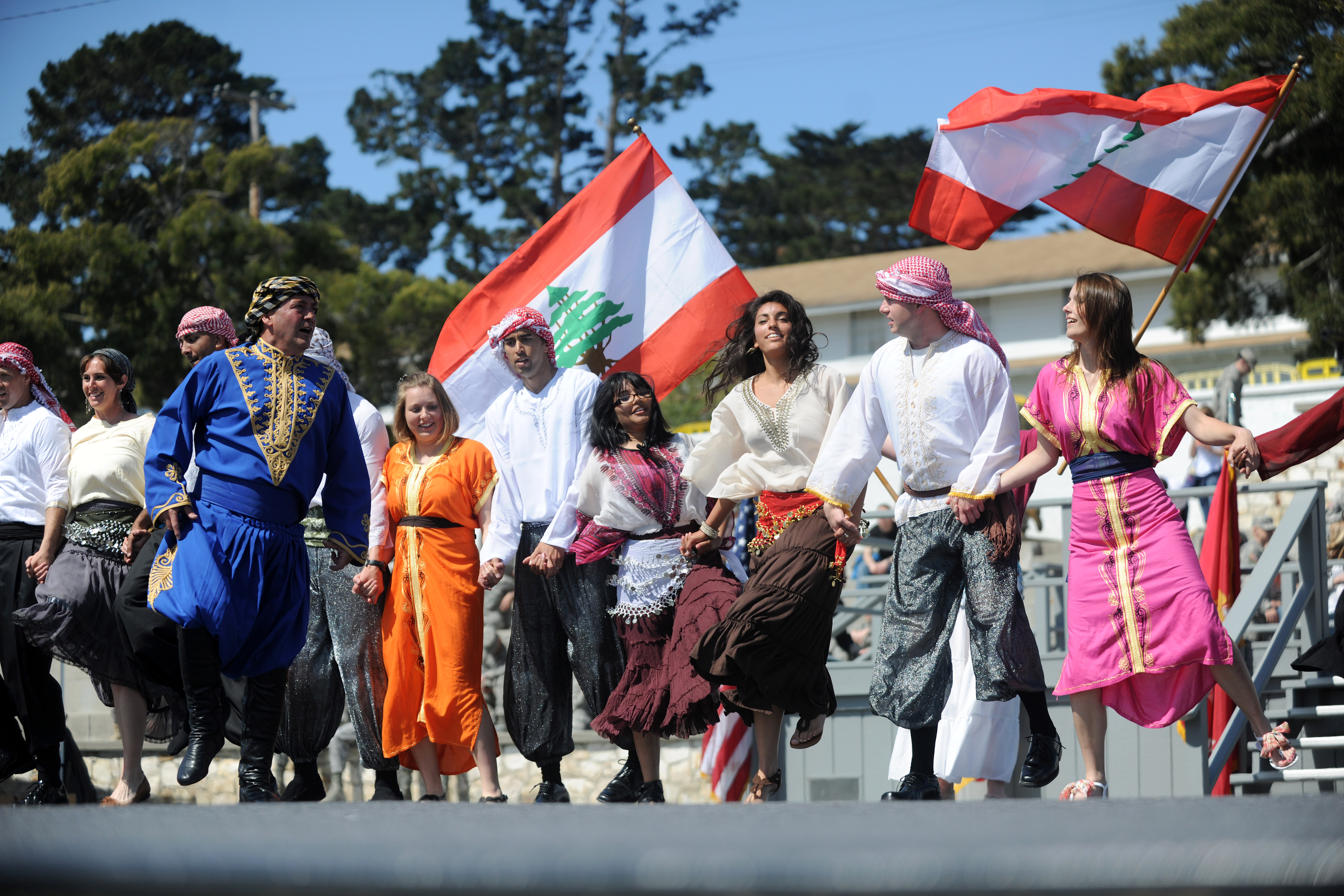
Lebanese flags flying in the background, while dancers in Lebanese traditional attire perform in the foreground

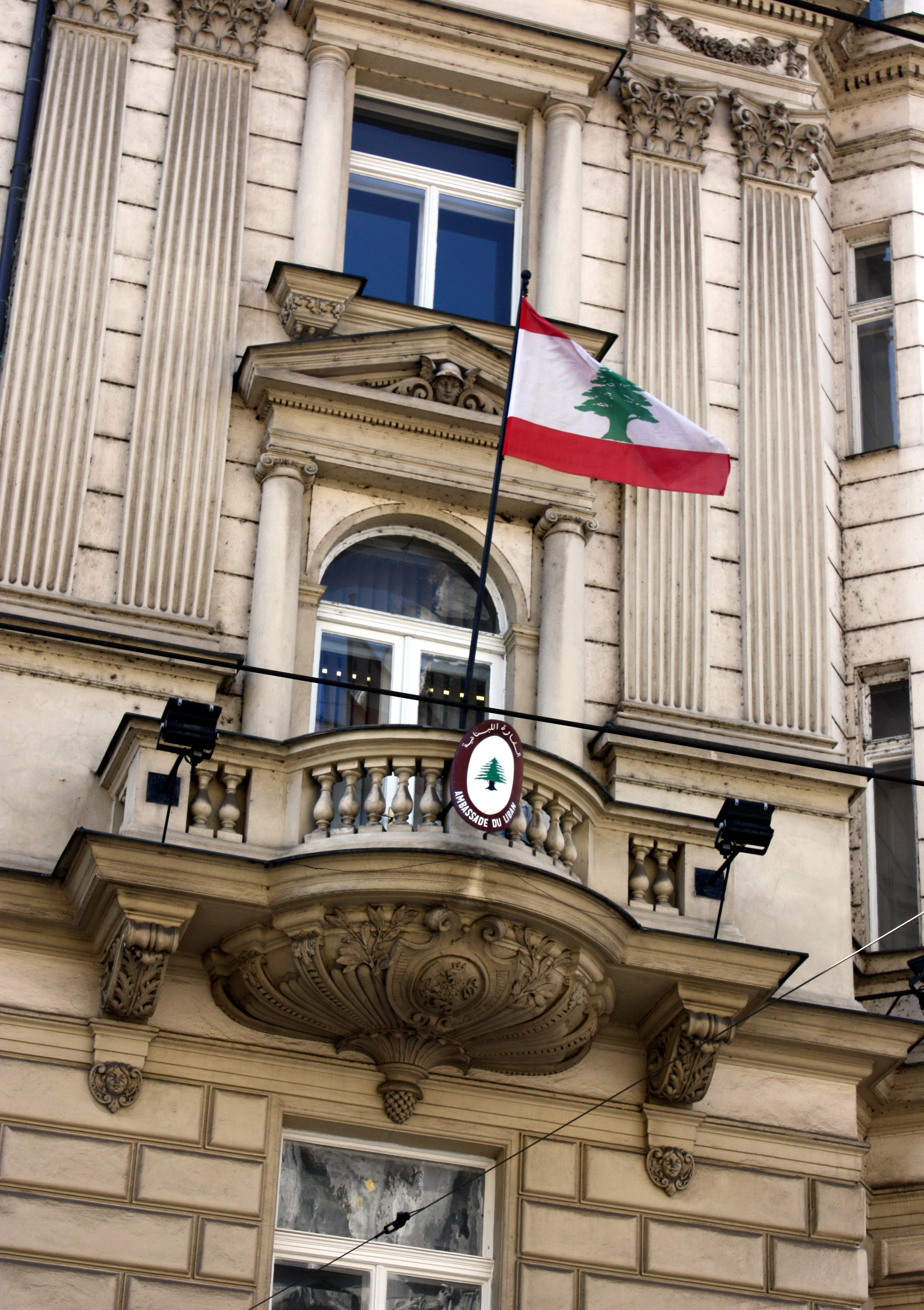
The flag of Lebanon flying over the Embassy of Lebanon in Prague

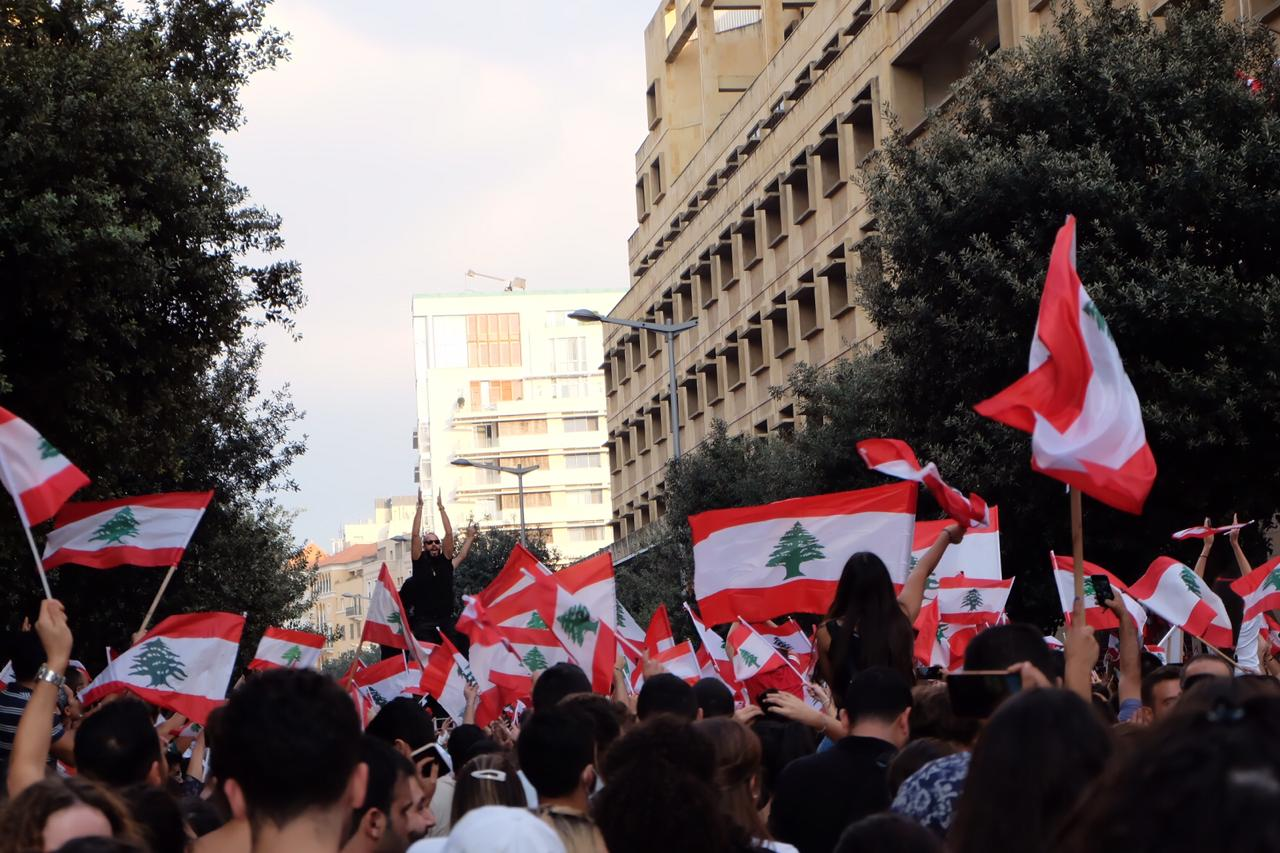
Protestors flying Lebanese flags during the 17 October Revolution in Beirut

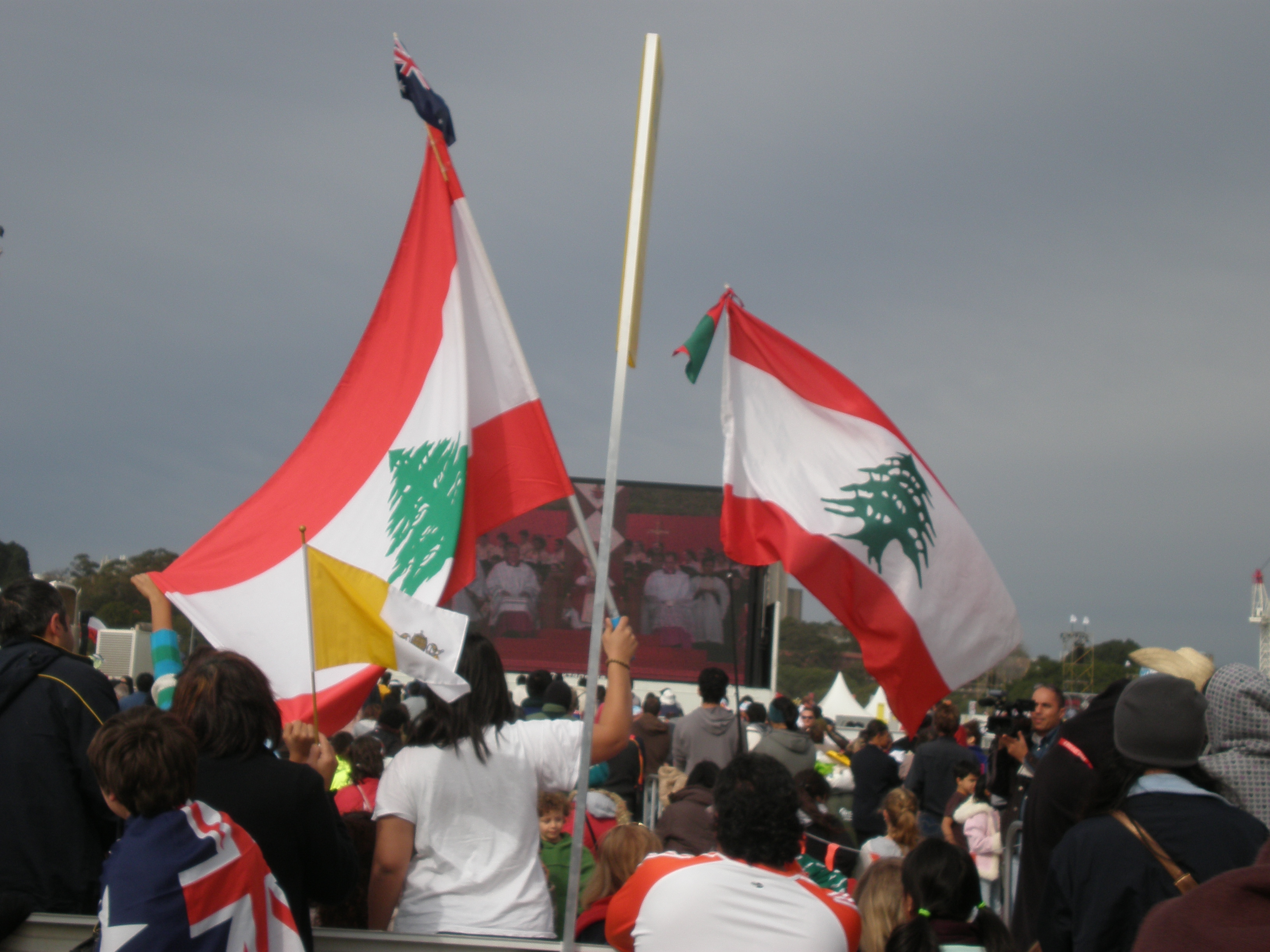
Lebanese celebrating World Youth Day 2008 in Sydney while holding the national flags

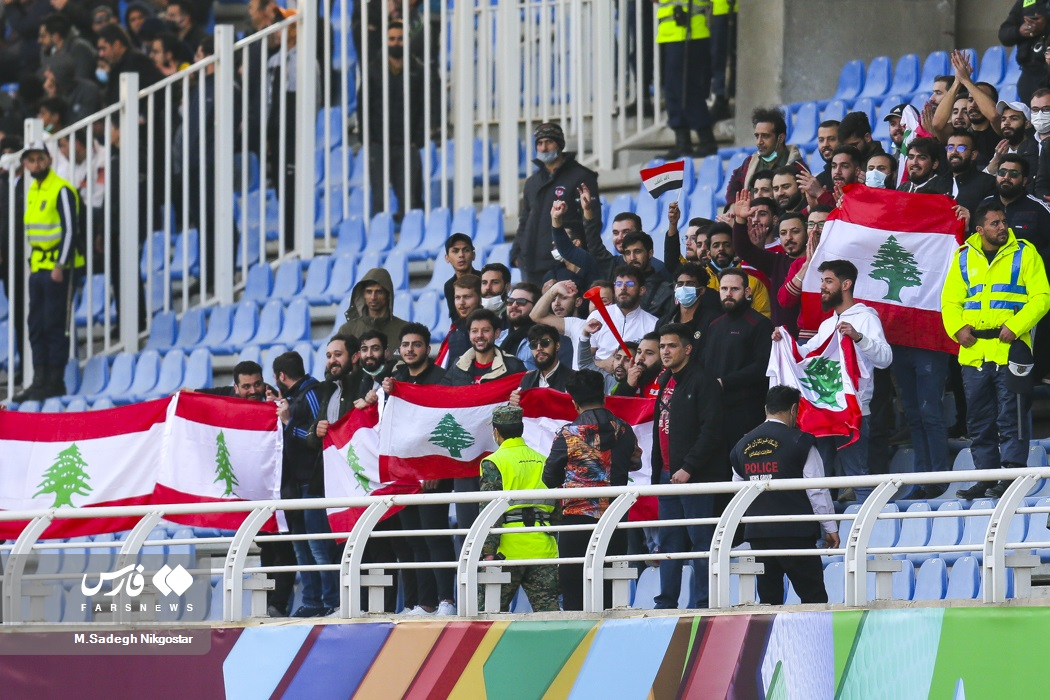
Football supporters holding flags of Lebanon during the 2022 FIFA World Cup qualifiers in Iran

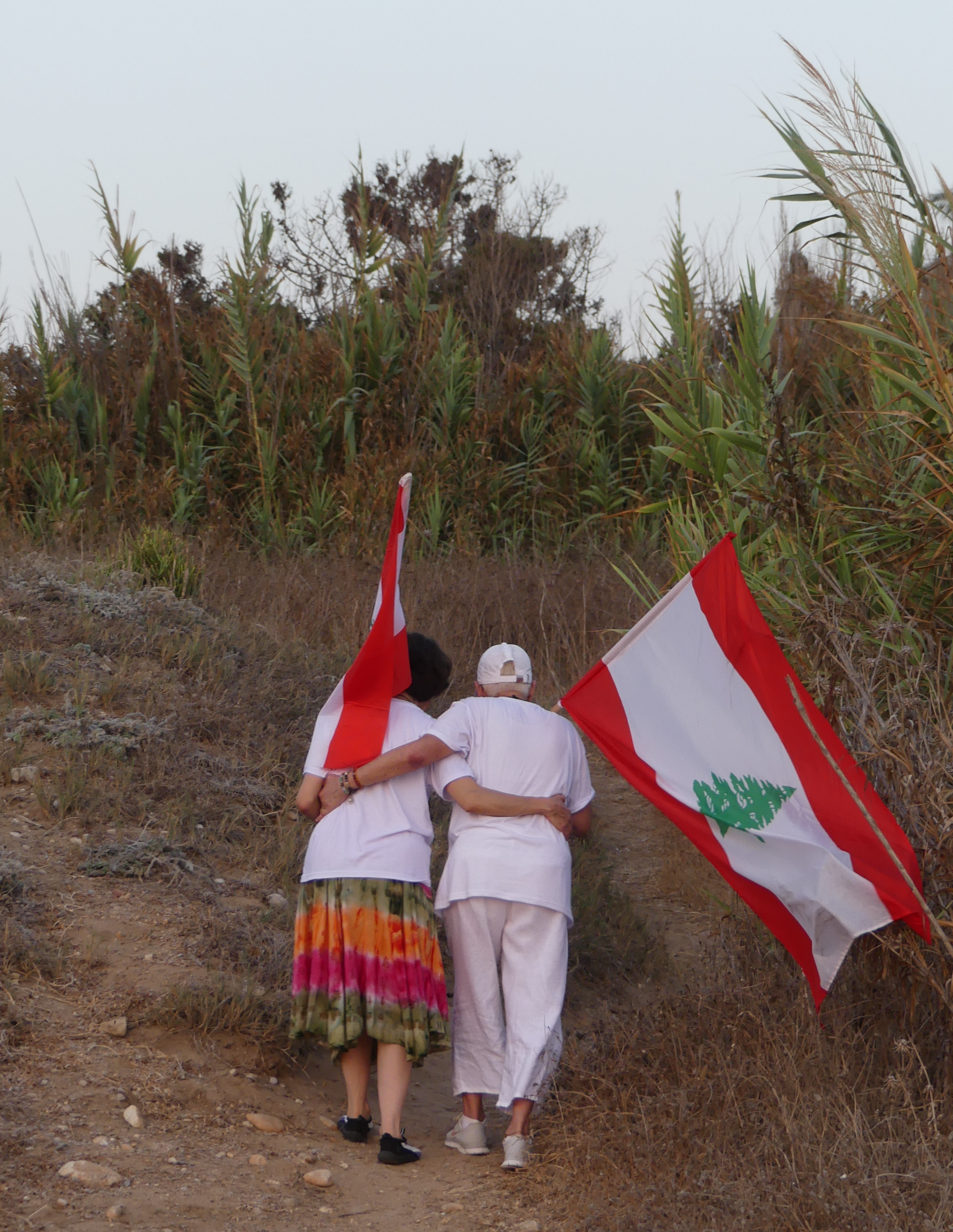
An elderly couple, each holding a flag of Lebanon while walking on the beach

== See also ==
- List of Lebanese flags
- Coat of arms of Lebanon
- Insignia of the Republican Guard Brigade
