= United States at the 1912 Summer Olympics =

- Flag of the United States (despite receiving the 47th and 48th stars on July 4, 1912, after New Mexico and Arizona gained statehood, the 46-star flag was used in the early days of the games)
- IOC code: USA
- NOC: United States Olympic Committee

in Stockholm
- Competitors: 174 in 11 sports
- Flag bearer: George Bonhag
- Medals Ranked 1st: Gold 26 Silver 19 Bronze 19 Total 64

Summer Olympics appearances (overview)
- 1896; 1900; 1904; 1908; 1912; 1920; 1924; 1928; 1932; 1936; 1948; 1952; 1956; 1960; 1964; 1968; 1972; 1976; 1980; 1984; 1988; 1992; 1996; 2000; 2004; 2008; 2012; 2016; 2020; 2024; 2028

Other related appearances
- 1906 Intercalated Games

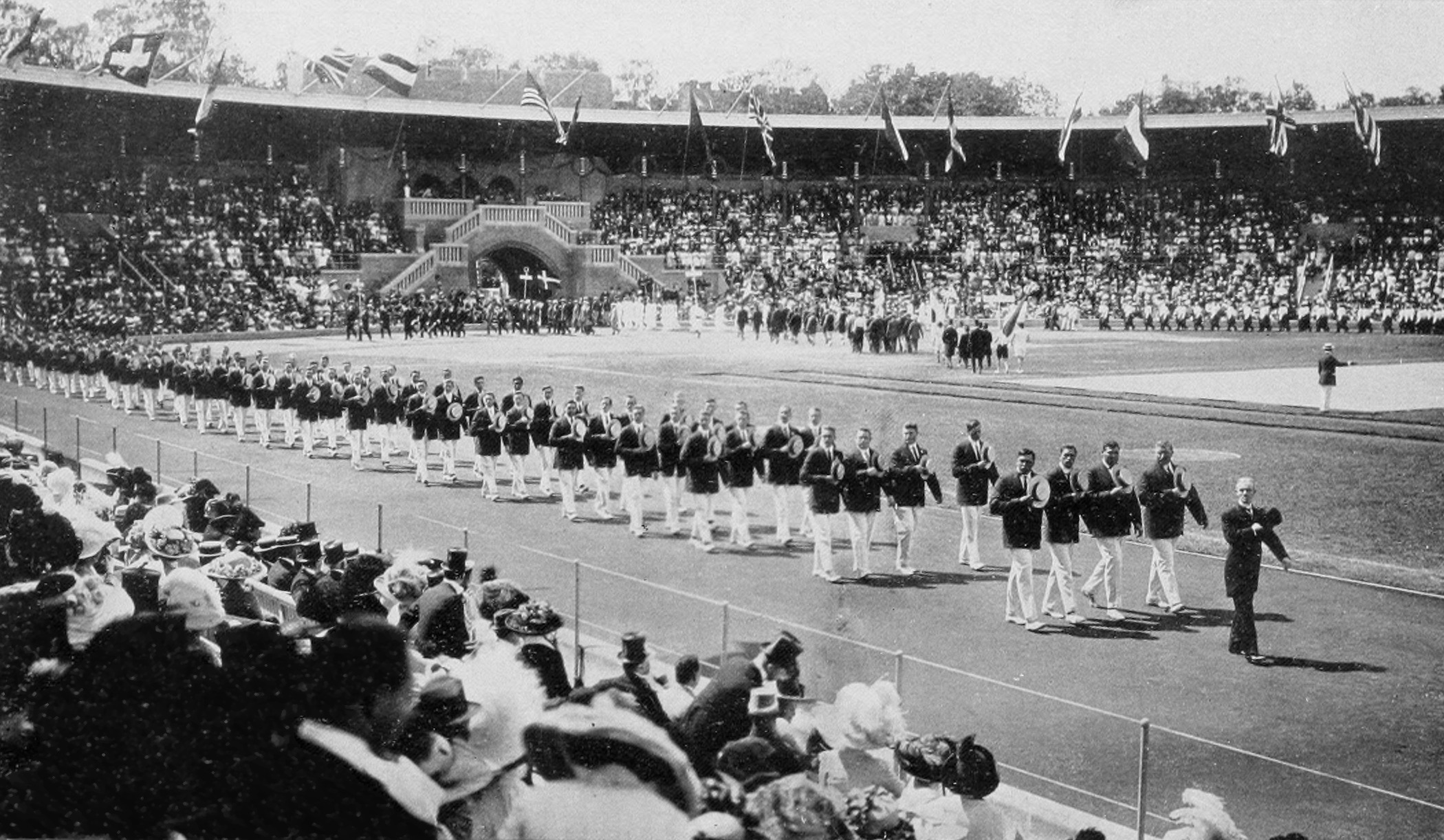
The team of the United States at the opening ceremony.

The United States competed at the 1912 Summer Olympics in Stockholm, Sweden. 174 competitors, took part in 68 events in 11 sports. Out of the 174 athletes who had participated, 64 won medals (including those on the teams whose medals are only counted once).

== Medalists ==
Medal	Name	Sport	Event	Date
Gold	Alfred Lane	Shooting	Men's 30 m rapid fire pistol	June 29
Gold	Harry Adams; Allan Briggs; Cornelius Burdette; John Jackson; Carl Osburn; Warren Sprout	Shooting	Men's team rifle	June 29
Gold	Alfred Lane	Shooting	Men's 50 m pistol	July 1
Gold	Charles W. Billings; Edward Gleason; James Graham; Frank Hall; John H. Hendrickson; Ralph Spotts	Shooting	Men's trap, team	July 1
Gold	John Dietz; Peter Dolfen; Alfred Lane; Harry Sears	Shooting	Men's 50 m team free pistol	July 2
Gold	Frederick Hird	Shooting	Men's 50 m rifle, prone	July 4
Gold	James Graham	Shooting	Men's trap	July 4
Gold	Ralph Craig	Athletics	Men's 100 m	July 7
Gold	Jim Thorpe	Athletics	Men's pentathlon	July 7
Gold	Ted Meredith	Athletics	Men's 800 m	July 8
Gold	Alma Richards	Athletics	Men's high jump	July 8
Gold	Edward Lindberg; Ted Meredith; Charles Reidpath; Mel Sheppard	Athletics	Men's 4 × 400 m relay	July 9
Gold	Pat McDonald	Athletics	Men's shot put	July 10
Gold	Duke Kahanamoku	Swimming	Men's 100 m freestyle	July 10
Gold	Ralph Craig	Athletics	Men's 200 m	July 11
Gold	Harry Babcock	Athletics	Men's pole vault	July 11
Gold	Ralph Rose	Athletics	Men's two handed shot put	July 11
Gold	Fred Kelly	Athletics	Men's 110 m hurdles	July 12
Gold	Albert Gutterson	Athletics	Men's long jump	July 12
Gold	Tell Berna; George Bonhag; Abel Kiviat; Louis Scott; Norman Taber	Athletics	Men's 3000 m team race	July 13
Gold	Platt Adams	Athletics	Men's standing high jump	July 13
Gold	Harry Hebner	Swimming	Men's 100 m backstroke	July 13
Gold	Charles Reidpath	Athletics	Men's 400 m	July 13
Gold	Matt McGrath	Athletics	Men's hammer throw	July 14
Gold	Jim Thorpe	Athletics	Men's decathlon	July 15
Silver	Peter Dolfen	Shooting	Men's 50 m pistol	July 1
Silver	Carl Osburn	Shooting	Men's 600 m free rifle	July 1
Silver	Carl Osburn	Shooting	Men's 300 m military rifle, three positions	July 1
Silver	William Leushner; William Libbey; William McDonnell; Walter W. Winans	Shooting	Men's 100 m team running deer, single shots	July 4
Silver	Alvah Meyer	Athletics	Men's 100 m	July 7
Silver	James Donahue	Athletics	Men's pentathlon	July 7
Silver	Mel Sheppard	Athletics	Men's 800 m	July 8
Silver	Lewis Tewanima	Athletics	Men's 10,000 m	July 8
Silver	Platt Adams	Athletics	Men's standing long jump	July 8
Silver	Abel Kiviat	Athletics	Men's 1500 m	July 10
Silver	Ralph Rose	Athletics	Men's shot put	July 10
Silver	Donald Lippincott	Athletics	Men's 200 m	July 11
Silver	Frank Nelson	Athletics	Men's pole vault	July 11
Silver	Marc Wright	Athletics	Men's pole vault	July 11
Silver	Pat McDonald	Athletics	Men's two handed shot put	July 11
Silver	James Wendell	Athletics	Men's 110 m hurdles	July 12
Silver	Richard Byrd	Athletics	Men's discus throw	July 12
Silver	Ben Adams	Athletics	Men's standing high jump	July 13
Silver	Harry Hebner; Ken Huszagh; Duke Kahanamoku; Perry McGillivray	Swimming	Men's 4 × 200 m freestyle relay	July 15
Bronze	John Jackson	Shooting	Men's 600 m free rifle	July 1
Bronze	William Leushner; William Libbey; William McDonnell; Walter W. Winans	Shooting	Men's 50 m team small-bore rifle	July 3
Bronze	William Leushner; William Libbey; William McDonnell; Walter W. Winans	Shooting	Men's 25 m team small-bore rifle	July 5
Bronze	Donald Lippincott	Athletics	Men's 100 m	July 7
Bronze	Albert Kruschel; Alvin Loftes; Walter Martin; Carl Schutte	Cycling	Men's team time trial	July 7
Bronze	Ira Davenport	Athletics	Men's 800 m	July 8
Bronze	George Horine	Athletics	Men's high jump	July 8
Bronze	Ben Adams	Athletics	Men's standing long jump	July 8
Bronze	Norman Taber	Athletics	Men's 1500 m	July 10
Bronze	Lawrence Whitney	Athletics	Men's shot put	July 10
Bronze	Ken Huszagh	Swimming	Men's 100 m freestyle	July 10
Bronze	Frank Murphy	Athletics	Men's pole vault	July 11
Bronze	Martin Hawkins	Athletics	Men's 110 m hurdles	July 12
Bronze	James Duncan	Athletics	Men's discus throw	July 12
Bronze	Edward Lindberg	Athletics	Men's 400 m	July 13
Bronze	Gaston Strobino	Athletics	Men's marathon	July 14
Bronze	Clarence Childs	Athletics	Men's hammer throw	July 14
Bronze	Carl Schutte	Cycling	Men's individual time trial	July 17
Bronze	Ephraim Graham; Guy Henry; Ben Lear; John Montgomery	Equestrian	Team eventing	July 17

== Aquatics ==
=== Diving ===
Two divers represented the United States. It was the nation's third appearance in diving, appearing in each edition of the diving competition. Both athletes competed in all three events. Gaidzik, the defending bronze medalist in the springboard, advanced to the final in that event and placed eighth. Neither diver advanced to the final in either of the other two events.

Rankings given are within the diver's heat.

Diver	Events	Heats		Final	
Diver	Events	Result	Rank	Result	Rank
George Gaidzik	3 m board	74.03	3 q	68.01	8
George Gaidzik	10 m platform	62.56	6	did not advance	
George Gaidzik	Plain high dive	36.2	2	did not advance	
Arthur McAleenan	3 m board	68.02	3	did not advance	
Arthur McAleenan	10 m platform	did not finish		did not advance	
Arthur McAleenan	Plain high dive	34.9	5	did not advance	

=== Swimming ===
Seven swimmers competed for the United States at the 1912 Games. It was the nation's fifth appearance in swimming, a sport in which the United States had competed at each Olympic Games.

The American men finished with two gold medals and the corresponding Olympic records, as well as a bronze medal, in individual events. The relay team added a silver medal, and briefly held the world record after winning its semifinal heat (the Australasian team would finish with the record and the gold medal).

Ranks given for each swimmer are within the heat.

Men

Swimmer	Events	Heat		Quarterfinal		Semifinal		Final	
Swimmer	Events	Result	Rank	Result	Rank	Result	Rank	Result	Rank
Harry Hebner	100 m freestyle	1:10.4	3	did not advance					
Harry Hebner	100 m backstroke	N/A		1:21.0 OR	1 Q	1:20.8 OR	1 Q	1:21.2	1st place, gold medalist(s)
Ken Huszagh	100 m freestyle	1:06.2	3 q	1:04.2	1 Q	1:06.2	2 Q	1:05.6	3rd place, bronze medalist(s)
Duke Kahanamoku	100 m freestyle	1:02.6 OR	1 Q	1:03.8	1 Q	1:02.4 OR	1 Q	1:03.4	1st place, gold medalist(s)
Mike McDermott	200 m breaststroke	N/A		Disqualified		did not advance			
Mike McDermott	400 m breaststroke	N/A		Disqualified		did not advance			
Perry McGillivray	100 m freestyle	1:04.8 OR	1 Q	1:04.4	2 Q	1:06.2	3	did not advance	
Nicholas Nerich	100 m freestyle	1:07.6	2 Q	1:08.8	3	did not advance			
Nicholas Nerich	400 m freestyle	N/A		5:50.4	3 q	5:51.0	4	did not advance	
James Reilly	100 m freestyle	Unknown	4	did not advance					
James Reilly	400 m freestyle	N/A		6:10.2	3	did not advance			
Harry Hebner; Ken Huszagh; Duke Kahanamoku; Perry McGillivray	4 × 200 m free relay	N/A				10:26.4 WR	1 Q	10:20.2	2nd place, silver medalist(s)

== Athletics ==
109 athletes represented the United States. It was the fifth appearance of the nation in athletics, in which it had competed at every Olympics. The Americans won gold medals in 16 of the 30 events and finished with 42 of the 94 total medals awarded. They swept the medals in 4 events, as well as taking the top three spots in the pole vault (one gold, two silver, and three bronze medals were awarded in the event due to ties—Americans took the gold, both silvers, and one of the bronzes).

Ranks given are within that athlete's heat for running events.

Athlete	Events	Heat		Semifinal		Final	
Athlete	Events	Result	Rank	Result	Rank	Result	Rank
Benjamin Adams	Standing long jump	N/A		3.28	3 Q	3.28	3rd place, bronze medalist(s)
Benjamin Adams	Standing high jump	N/A		1.50	1 Q	1.60	2nd place, silver medalist(s)
Platt Adams	Triple jump	N/A		14.09	5	did not advance	
Platt Adams	High jump	N/A		1.70	23	did not advance	
Platt Adams	Standing long jump	N/A		3.32	2 Q	3.36	2nd place, silver medalist(s)
Platt Adams	Standing high jump	N/A		1.50	1 Q	1.63	1st place, gold medalist(s)
Fred Allen	Long jump	N/A		6.94	6	did not advance	
Lewis Anderson	1500 m	N/A		?	4	did not advance	
Harry Babcock	Pole vault	N/A		3.65	1 Q	3.95	1st place, gold medalist(s)
Harry Babcock	Decathlon	N/A				2054.050	25
Sam Bellah	Pole vault	N/A		3.65	1 Q	3.75	7
Frank Belote	100 m	11.0	1 Q	11.1	1 Q	11.0	5
Frank Belote	Standing high jump	N/A		1.45	7	did not advance	
Tell Berna	5000 m	N/A		15:53.3	3 Q	15:10.0	5
Tell Berna	Ind. cross country	N/A				did not finish	
Vaughn Blanchard	110 m hurdles	16.0	2 Q	15.7	2	did not advance	
George Bonhag	5000 m	N/A		15:22.6 OR	1 Q	15:09.8	4
George Bonhag	Ind. cross country	N/A				did not finish	
Charles Brickley	Triple jump	N/A		13.88	9	did not advance	
Avery Brundage	Discus throw	N/A		37.85	22	did not advance	
Avery Brundage	Pentathlon	N/A				31	6
Avery Brundage	Decathlon	N/A				5580.900	16
Jervis Burdick	High jump	N/A		1.80	12	did not advance	
Richard Byrd	Standing long jump	N/A		3.12	8	did not advance	
Richard Byrd	Standing high jump	N/A		1.50	1 Q	1.50	4
Richard Byrd	Discus throw	N/A		42.32	2 Q	42.32	2nd place, silver medalist(s)
Richard Byrd	2 hand discus	N/A		62.32	17	did not advance	
David Caldwell	800 m	1:58.6	1 Q	1:55.9	3 Q	1:52.8	4
John Case	110 m hurdles	16.3	1 Q	15.6	1 Q	15.3	4
Clarence Childs	Hammer throw	N/A		48.17	3	48.17	3rd place, bronze medalist(s)
George Chisholm	110 m hurdles	15.4	1 Q	15.7	2	did not advance	
Carl Cooke	200 m	22.5	1 Q	?	2	did not advance	
Ira Courtney	100 m	11.2	1 Q	?	2	did not advance	
Ira Courtney	200 m	22.7	1 Q	?	3	did not advance	
Frank Coyle	Pole vault	N/A		3.65	1 Q	3.65	8
Ralph Craig	100 m	11.2	1 Q	10.7	1 Q	10.8	1st place, gold medalist(s)
Ralph Craig	200 m	22.8	1 Q	21.9	1 Q	21.7	1st place, gold medalist(s)
Ira Davenport	400 m	?	2 Q	?	2	did not advance	
Ira Davenport	800 m	1:59.0	1 Q	1:55.9	4 Q	1:52.0	3rd place, bronze medalist(s)
Clarence DeMar	Marathon	N/A				2:50:46.6	12
Howard Drew	100 m	11.0	1 Q	11.0	1 Q	did not start	
James Donahue	Pentathlon	N/A				29	2nd place, silver medalist(s)
James Donahue	Decathlon	N/A				7083.450	5
Gordon Dukes	Pole vault	N/A		3.65	1 Q	3.65	8
James Duncan	Discus throw	N/A		42.28	3 Q	42.38	3rd place, bronze medalist(s)
James Duncan	2 hand discus	N/A		71.13	5	did not advance	
Clarence Edmundson	400 m	50.2	1 Q	?	2	did not advance	
Clarence Edmundson	800 m	1:56.5	1 Q	1:55.8	2 Q	?	7
John Eller	110 m hurdles	16.0	1 Q	15.7	2	did not advance	
John Eller	Pentathlon	N/A				Elim-3 47	19
Harold Enright	High jump	N/A		1.75	13	did not advance	
Egon Erickson	High jump	N/A		1.83	1 Q	1.87	4
Joseph Erxleben	Marathon	N/A				2:45:47.2	8
Edward Farrell	Long jump	N/A		6.71	13	did not advance	
Edward Farrell	Triple jump	N/A		13.57	13	did not advance	
Edward Fitzgerald	5000 m	N/A		did not finish		did not advance	
Forest Fletcher	Standing long jump	N/A		3.11	9	did not advance	
Forest Fletcher	Standing high jump	N/A		1.45	7	did not advance	
Joseph Forshaw	Marathon	N/A				2:49:49.4	10
Bill Fritz	Pole vault	N/A		3.65	1 Q	3.65	8
John Gallagher	Marathon	N/A				2:44:19.4	7
Peter Gerhardt	100 m	11.2	1 Q	?	3	did not advance	
Peter Gerhardt	200 m	22.9	1 Q	?	2	did not advance	
Simon Gillis	Hammer throw	N/A		No mark	14	did not advance	
Leo Goehring	Standing long jump	N/A		3.14	5	did not advance	
Leo Goehring	Standing high jump	N/A		1.50	1 Q	1.50	4
Harry Grumpelt	High jump	N/A		1.83	1 Q	1.85	6
Albert Gutterson	Long jump	N/A		7.60 OR	1 Q	7.60	1st place, gold medalist(s)
Carroll Haff	400 m	50.4	1 Q	49.7	1 Q	49.5	5
Thomas Halpin	800 m	1:59.2	4	did not advance			
Martin Hawkins	110 m hurdles	16.1	1 Q	15.7	1 Q	15.3	3rd place, bronze medalist(s)
Frederick Hedlund	1500 m	N/A		4:10.8	2 Q	?	9–14
Harold Heiland	100 m	?	3	did not advance			
Harold Heiland	200 m	?	2 Q	?	4	did not advance	
Harry Hellawell	10000 m	N/A		did not finish		did not advance	
Harry Hellawell	Ind. cross country	N/A				48:12.0	12
Harlan Holden	800 m	1:58.1	1 Q	?	6–9	did not advance	
George Horine	High jump	N/A		1.83	1 Q	1.89	3rd place, bronze medalist(s)
Frank Irons	Long jump	N/A		6.80	9	did not advance	
John Johnstone	High jump	N/A		1.83	1 Q	1.85	6
John Paul Jones	800 m	2:01.8	1 Q	did not start		did not advance	
John Paul Jones	1500 m	N/A		4:12.4	2 Q	3:57.2	4
Frederick Kaiser	10 km walk	N/A		51:31.8	5	did not finish	
Fred Kelly	110 m hurdles	16.4	1 Q	15.6	1 Q	15.1	1st place, gold medalist(s)
Abel Kiviat	1500 m	N/A		4:04.4	1 Q	3:56.9	2nd place, silver medalist(s)
William Kramer	10000 m	N/A		did not finish		did not advance	
William Kramer	Ind. cross country	N/A				did not finish	
Thomas Lilley	Marathon	N/A				2:59:35.4	18
Edward Lindberg	400 m	50.6	1 Q	48.9	1 Q	48.4	3rd place, bronze medalist(s)
Donald Lippincott	100 m	10.6 WR	1 Q	10.7	1 Q	10.9	3rd place, bronze medalist(s)
Donald Lippincott	200 m	22.8	1 Q	21.8	1 Q	21.8	2nd place, silver medalist(s)
Louis Madeira	1500 m	N/A		4:27.9	2 Q	?	9–14
Hugh Maguire	10000 m	N/A		34:32.0	5 Q	did not finish	
Walter McClure	800 m	?	3	did not advance			
Walter McClure	1500 m	N/A		4:07.3	2 Q	?	8
Wallace McCurdy	5000 m	N/A		did not finish		did not advance	
Pat McDonald	Shot put	N/A		14.78	2 Q	15.34 OR	1st place, gold medalist(s)
Pat McDonald	2 hand shot	N/A		25.09	3	27.53	2nd place, silver medalist(s)
Matt McGrath	Hammer throw	N/A		54.13 OR	1	54.74 OR	1st place, gold medalist(s)
James Menaul	Pentathlon	N/A				30	5
Eugene Mercer	Long jump	N/A		6.97	5	did not advance	
Eugene Mercer	Decathlon	N/A				7074.995	6
Ted Meredith	400 m	?	2 Q	48.8	1 Q	49.2	4
Ted Meredith	800 m	?	2 Q	1:54.4	1 Q	1:51.9 WR	1st place, gold medalist(s)
Alvah Meyer	100 m	11.6	1 Q	10.7	1 Q	10.9	2nd place, silver medalist(s)
Alvah Meyer	200 m	24.1	1 Q	?	2	did not advance	
Arlie Mucks	Discus throw	N/A		40.93	6	did not advance	
Arlie Mucks	2 hand discus	N/A		63.83	15	did not advance	
Emil Muller	Discus throw	N/A		39.35	12	did not advance	
Emil Muller	2 hand discus	N/A		69.56	6	did not advance	
Frank Murphy	Pole vault	N/A		3.65	1 Q	3.80	3rd place, bronze medalist(s)
Frank Nelson	Pole vault	N/A		3.65	1 Q	3.85	2nd place, silver medalist(s)
John Nicholson	110 m hurdles	15.5	1 Q	15.4	1 Q	did not finish	
John Nicholson	High jump	N/A		No mark	34	did not advance	
Wesley Oler	High jump	N/A		1.75	13	did not advance	
James Patterson	1500 m	N/A		4:05.5	3	did not advance	
George Philbrook	Shot put	N/A		13.13	5	did not advance	
George Philbrook	Discus throw	N/A		40.92	7	did not advance	
George Philbrook	Decathlon	N/A				6538.520	13
Richard Piggott	Marathon	N/A				2:46:40.7	9
Edwin Pritchard	110 m hurdles	16.4	1 Q	15.6	2	did not advance	
Herbert Putnam	800 m	?	2 Q	1:55.0	4 Q	?	8
Herbert Putnam	1500 m	N/A		4:07.6	3	did not advance	
Charles Reidpath	200 m	22.6	1 Q	22.1	1 Q	22.3	5
Charles Reidpath	400 m	51.2	2 Q	48.7	1 Q	48.2 OR	1st place, gold medalist(s)
Edward Renz	10 km walk	N/A		53:30.8	7	did not advance	
John Reynolds	Marathon	N/A				did not finish	
Alma Richards	High jump	N/A		1.83	1 Q	1.93	1st place, gold medalist(s)
Ralph Rose	Shot put	N/A		15.25 OR	1 Q	15.25	2nd place, silver medalist(s)
Ralph Rose	Discus throw	N/A		39.65	11	did not advance	
Ralph Rose	Hammer throw	N/A		42.58	8	did not advance	
Ralph Rose	2 hand shot	N/A		26.50	2	27.70	1st place, gold medalist(s)
James Rosenberger	400 m	50.6	1 Q	did not finish		did not advance	
Michael J. Ryan	Marathon	N/A				did not finish	
Samuel Schwartz	10 km walk	N/A		53:30.8	6	did not advance	
Henry Scott	5000 m	N/A		15:23.5	1 Q	?	8–11
Henry Scott	10000 m	N/A		34:14.2	3 Q	did not finish	
Henry Scott	Ind. cross country	N/A				53:51.4	24
Mel Sheppard	400 m	1:06.6	2 Q	48.9	2	did not advance	
Mel Sheppard	800 m	?	2 Q	1:54.8	3 Q	1:52.0	2nd place, silver medalist(s)
Mel Sheppard	1500 m	N/A		4:27.6	1 Q	?	9–14
Benjamin Sherman	Hammer throw	N/A		38.77	12	did not advance	
Harry Smith	Marathon	N/A				2:52:53.8	17
Andrew Sockalexis	Marathon	N/A				2:42:07.9	4
Gaston Strobino	Marathon	N/A				2:38:42.4	3rd place, bronze medalist(s)
Norman Taber	1500 m	N/A		4:25.5	1 Q	3:56.9	3rd place, bronze medalist(s)
Lewis Tewanima	10000 m	N/A		32:31.4	2 Q	32:06.6	2nd place, silver medalist(s)
Lewis Tewanima	Marathon	N/A				2:52:41.4	16
Rupert Thomas	100 m	?	2 Q	?	3	did not advance	
Jim Thorpe	Long jump	N/A		6.89	7	did not advance	
Jim Thorpe	High jump	N/A		1.83	1 Q	1.87	4
Jim Thorpe	Decathlon	N/A				8412.955	1st place, gold medalist(s)
Jim Thorpe	Pentathlon	N/A				7	1st place, gold medalist(s)
Alfred Voellmeke	10 km walk	N/A		52:29.0	6	did not advance	
James Wendell	110 m hurdles	15.7	2 Q	15.5	1 Q	15.2	2nd place, silver medalist(s)
Lawrence Whitney	Shot put	N/A		13.93	3 Q	13.93	3rd place, bronze medalist(s)
Lawrence Whitney	Discus throw	N/A		37.91	20	did not advance	
Lawrence Whitney	2 hand shot	N/A		24.09	4	did not advance	
Garnett Wikoff	5000 m	N/A		did not finish		did not advance	
Clement Wilson	100 m	?	2 Q	?	4	did not advance	
Clement Wilson	200 m	?	2 Q	?	2	did not advance	
Harry Worthington	Long jump	N/A		7.03	4	did not advance	
Marc Wright	Pole vault	N/A		3.65	1 Q	3.85	2nd place, silver medalist(s)
Donnell Young	200 m	22.8	1 Q	21.9	1 Q	22.3	6
Donnell Young	400 m	50.4	2 Q	Disqualified		did not advance	
Tell Berna; Harry Hellawell; Henry Scott	Team cross country	N/A				did not finish	
Frank Belote; Carl Cooke; Ira Courtney; Clement Wilson	4 × 100 m	43.7 OR	1 Q	Disqualified		did not advance	
Edward Lindberg; Ted Meredith; Charles Reidpath; Mel Sheppard	4 × 400 m	N/A		3:23.3	1 Q	3:16.6 WR	1st place, gold medalist(s)
Tell Berna; George Bonhag; Abel Kiviat; Henry Scott; Norman Taber	3000 m team	N/A		9	1 Q	9	1st place, gold medalist(s)

== Cycling ==
Nine cyclists represented the United States. It was the fourth appearance of the nation in cycling, which had not appeared in 1896. The American cyclists won both bronze medals in the cycling competitions, with Carl Schutte taking third place in the individual competition and the fastest four Americans posting a combined time placing third in the team competition.

=== Road cycling ===
Cyclist	Events	Final	
Cyclist	Events	Result	Rank
John Becht	Ind. time trial	11:35:04.8	28
Joseph Kopsky	Ind. time trial	11:27:06.0	20
Albert Krushel	Ind. time trial	11:17:30.0	13
Alvin Loftes	Ind. time trial	11:13:51.3	11
Walter Martin	Ind. time trial	11:23:55.2	17
Frank Meissner	Ind. time trial	12:29:09.0	70
Jesse Pike	Ind. time trial	12:06:21.6	54
Carl Schutte	Ind. time trial	10:52:38.8	3rd place, bronze medalist(s)
Jerome Steinert	Ind. time trial	12:08:32.3	56
Alvin Loftes; Albert Krushel; Walter Martin; Carl Schutte	Team time trial	11:13:51.3	3rd place, bronze medalist(s)

== Equestrian ==
Dressage

Rider	Horse	Event	Final	
Rider	Horse	Event	Penalties	Rank
Guy Henry	Chiswell	Individual	93	13
John Montgomery	Deceive	Individual	130	20

Eventing

(The maximum score in each of the five events was 10.00 points. Ranks given are for the cumulative score after each event. Team score is the sum of the top three individual scores.)

Rider	Horse	Event	Long distance		Cross country		Steeplechase		Show jumping		Dressage		Total	
Rider	Horse	Event	Score	Rank	Score	Rank	Score	Rank	Score	Rank	Score	Rank	Score	Rank
Ephraim Graham	Connie	Individual	10.00	1	9.62	19	10.00	13	9.40	8	6.28	12	45.30	12
Guy Henry	Chiswell	Individual	10.00	1	9.46	21	10.00	15	9.13	12	6.95	11	45.54	11
Benjamin Lear	Poppy	Individual	10.00	1	10.00	1	10.00	1	9.07	7	6.84	7	45.91	7
John Montgomery	Deceive	Individual	10.00	1	10.00	1	10.00	1	9.40	3	6.48	9	45.88	9
Guy Henry; Benjamin Lear; John Montgomery; Ephraim Graham	Chiswell; Poppy; Deceive; Connie	Team	30.00		29.46		30.00		27.60		19.27		137.33	3rd place, bronze medalist(s)

== Fencing ==
Thirteen fencers represented the United States. It was the third appearance of the nation in fencing. No American fencer reached the finals, though two advanced to the semifinals.

Fencer	Event	Round 1		Quarterfinal		Semifinal		Final	
Fencer	Event	Record	Rank	Record	Rank	Record	Rank	Record	Rank
William Bowman	Foil	3 losses	4	did not advance					
William Bowman	Épée	2 losses	3 Q	2 losses	2 Q	3 losses	3	did not advance	
Scott Breckenridge	Foil	3 losses	3 Q	3 losses	4	did not advance			
George Breed	Foil	3 losses	4	did not advance					
George Breed	Épée	1 loss	3 Q	3 losses	4	did not advance			
John Gignoux	Foil	5 losses	6	did not advance					
John Gignoux	Épée	5 losses	7	did not advance					
Sherman Hall	Foil	1 loss	1 Q	1 loss	3 Q	2 losses	3	did not advance	
Sherman Hall	Épée	4 losses	4	did not advance					
Graeme Hammond	Foil	3 losses	4	did not advance					
Graeme Hammond	Épée	3 losses	4	did not advance					
Marc Larimer	Foil	2 losses	2 Q	4 losses	5	did not advance			
Marc Larimer	Épée	3 losses	4	did not advance					
John MacLaughlin	Foil	4 losses	4	did not advance					
John MacLaughlin	Épée	5 losses	7	did not advance					
James Moore	Épée	5 losses	7	did not advance					
Harold Raynor	Foil	0 losses	1 Q	4 losses	6	did not advance			
Alfred Sauer	Foil	3 losses	4	did not advance					
Alfred Sauer	Épée	3 losses	4	did not advance					
Alfred Sauer	Sabre	Bye		3 losses	4	did not advance			
Frederic Schenck	Épée	Bye		3 losses	4	did not advance			
Albertson van zo Post	Foil	1 loss	1 Q	did not start		did not advance			
Albertson van zo Post	Épée	Bye		3 losses	5	did not advance			
Albertson van zo Post	Sabre	1 win	3 Q	did not start		did not advance			
William Bowman; Scott Breckinridge; George Breed; Sherman Hall; John MacLaughlin; Albertson Van Zo Post	Team épée	N/A		0–2	3	did not advance			

== Modern pentathlon ==
The United States had one competitor in the first Olympic pentathlon competition. George S. Patton, who would become a famous general during World War II, excelled in the military-influenced set of events. Patton finished in fifth place; he was the only non-Swede among the top seven finishers.

(The scoring system was point-for-place in each of the five events, with the smallest point total winning.)

Athlete	Shooting		Swimming		Fencing			Riding			Running		Total points	Rank
Athlete	Score	Points	Time	Points	Wins	Touches	Points	Penalties	Time	Points	Time	Points	Total points	Rank
George S. Patton	150	20	5:56.6	7	20	26	4	0	10:42.0	6	20:01.3	3	41	5

== Shooting ==
Twenty six shooters represented the United States. It was the nation's third appearance in shooting. The Americans won a total of 14 medals, half of which were gold. Only the host nation, Sweden, did better (with two more silver medals and one more bronze).

Shooter	Event	Final	
Shooter	Event	Result	Rank
Harry Adams	300 m free rifle, 3 pos.	903	28
Harry Adams	600 m free rifle	86	12
Harry Adams	300 m military rifle, 3 pos.	89	12
Ed Anderson	50 m rifle, prone	185	23
Ed Anderson	25 m small-bore rifle	208	16
Harold Bartlett	300 m free rifle, 3 pos.	884	36
Harold Bartlett	600 m free rifle	83	19
Harold Bartlett	300 m military rifle, 3 pos.	90	9
Charles Billings	Trap	14	41
Allan Briggs	300 m free rifle, 3 pos.	888	35
Allan Briggs	600 m free rifle	93	4
Allan Briggs	300 m military rifle, 3 pos.	85	25
Cornelius Burdette	300 m free rifle, 3 pos.	912	21
Cornelius Burdette	600 m free rifle	87	8
Cornelius Burdette	300 m military rifle, 3 pos.	75	52
John Dietz	50 m pistol	454	9
John Dietz	30 m rapid fire pistol	283	4
Peter Dolfen	50 m pistol	474	2nd place, silver medalist(s)
Peter Dolfen	30 m rapid fire pistol	274	16
Edward Gleason	Trap	87	9
James Graham	Trap	96	1st place, gold medalist(s)
Frank Hall	Trap	86	12
John H. Hendrickson	Trap	14	41
Frederick Hird	50 m rifle, prone	194	1st place, gold medalist(s)
Frederick Hird	300 m free rifle, 3 pos.	875	38
Frederick Hird	600 m free rifle	81	26
Frederick Hird	300 m military rifle, 3 pos.	84	28
Frederick Hird	25 m small-bore rifle	221	8
John Jackson	600 m free rifle	93	3rd place, bronze medalist(s)
John Jackson	300 m military rifle, 3 pos.	82	33
Alfred Lane	50 m pistol	499	1st place, gold medalist(s)
Alfred Lane	30 m rapid fire pistol	287	1st place, gold medalist(s)
William Leushner	50 m rifle, prone	189	7
William Leushner	25 m small-bore rifle	206	24
William Leushner	100 m deer, single shots	37	8
William Leushner	100 m deer, double shots	49	15
William McDonnell	50 m rifle, prone	186	18
William McDonnell	600 m free rifle	80	32
William McDonnell	300 m military rifle, 3 pos.	82	31
William McDonnell	25 m small-bore rifle	212	14
Daniel McMahon	Trap	36	35
Carl Osburn	50 m rifle, prone	187	13
Carl Osburn	300 m free rifle, 3 pos.	915	17
Carl Osburn	600 m free rifle	94	2nd place, silver medalist(s)
Carl Osburn	300 m military rifle, 3 pos.	95	2nd place, silver medalist(s)
Carl Osburn	25 m small-bore rifle	146	34
Hans Roedder	50 m pistol	431	22
Hans Roedder	30 m rapid fire pistol	275	10
Reginald Sayre	50 m pistol	452	13
Reginald Sayre	30 m rapid fire pistol	268	19
Harry Sears	50 m pistol	459	7
Harry Sears	30 m rapid fire pistol	266	21
Ralph Spotts	Trap	87	9
Warren Sprout	50 m rifle, prone	187	12
Warren Sprout	300 m free rifle, 3 pos.	896	32
Warren Sprout	600 m free rifle	85	14
Warren Sprout	300 m military rifle, 3 pos.	81	37
Warren Sprout	25 m small-bore rifle	205	17
Walter Winans	100 m deer, single shots	24	29
Walter Winans	100 m deer, double shots	59	11
Walter Winans	50 m pistol	356	49
Walter Winans	30 m rapid fire pistol	276	8
John Dietz; Peter Dolfen; Alfred Lane; Harry Sears	50 m team military pistol	1916	1st place, gold medalist(s)
John Dietz; Alfred Lane; Reginald Sayre; Walter Winans	30 m team military pistol	1097	4
Frederick Hird; William Leushner; William McDonnell; Warren Sprout	25 m team small-bore rifle	881	3rd place, bronze medalist(s)
Frederick Hird; William Leushner; Carl Osburn; Warren Sprout	50 m team small-bore rifle	744	3rd place, bronze medalist(s)
William Leushner; William Libbey; William McDonnell; Walter Winans	100 m team deer, single shots	132	2nd place, silver medalist(s)
Harry Adams; Allan Briggs; Cornelius Burdette; John Jackson; Carl Osburn; Warren Sprout	Team rifle	1687	1st place, gold medalist(s)
Charles Billings; Edward Gleason; James Graham; Frank Hall; John Hendrickson; Ralph Spotts	30 m team military pistol	532	1st place, gold medalist(s)

== Tennis ==
A single tennis player represented the United States at the 1912 Games. It was the nation's third appearance in tennis. Pell advanced to the round of 16 before being defeated in the men's outdoor singles.

Men

Athlete	Event	Round of 128	Round of 64	Round of 32	Round of 16	Quarterfinals	Semifinals	Final	
Athlete	Event	Opposition Score	Opposition Score	Opposition Score	Opposition Score	Opposition Score	Opposition Score	Opposition Score	Rank
Theodore Pell	Outdoor singles	Bye	Bye	Canet (FRA); W 6–2, 6–3, 6–4	Heyden (GER); W 2–6, 7–5, 8–6, 7–5	did not advance			9

== Wrestling ==
=== Greco-Roman ===
The United States was represented by two wrestlers at its third Olympic wrestling appearance. Both men competed in the featherweight class and lost each of their first two bouts to be eliminated from competition.

Wrestler	Class	First round	Second round	Third round	Fourth round	Fifth round	Sixth round	Seventh round	Final			
Wrestler	Class	Opposition Result	Opposition Result	Opposition Result	Opposition Result	Opposition Result	Opposition Result	Opposition Result	Match A Opposition Result	Match B Opposition Result	Match C Opposition Result	Rank
William Lysohn	Featherweight	Pongrácz (HUN); L	Johansson (SWE); L	did not advance								26
George Retzer	Featherweight	Schärer (AUT); L	Rauss (AUT); L	did not advance								26
