= List of British sport shooters =

This is a list that includes people involved in all varieties of target rifle, pistol shooting, clay pigeon shooting and olympic trap. The following people are involved, or have been involved in sport shooting in the United Kingdom:

- Alister Allan
- Edward Amoore
- David Ball
- George Barnes
- Richard Barnett
- John Bellamy
- Maurice Blood
- Henry Burr
- Henry Burt
- John Butt
- Arthur Carnell
- Geoffrey Coles
- Malcolm Cooper
- Hugh Durant
- Richard Faulds
- John Faunthorpe
- John Fleming
- Arthur Fulton
- William Grosvenor
- Aaron Heading
- Harold Humby
- Alfred Paget Humphry
- Albert Kempster
- William Russell Lane-Joynt
- Edward Lessimore
- Henry Lynch-Staunton
- Cyril Mackworth-Praed
- Alexander Martin
- Maurice Matthews
- Alexander Maunder
- John MacGregor
- Joshua Millner
- William Milne
- Robert Murray
- Philip Neame
- Charles Nix
- Anita North
- Harcourt Ommundsen
- Charles Palmer
- Rachel Parish
- Edward Parnell
- Joseph Pepé
- Herbert Perry
- Prince Philip
- William Pimm
- Horatio Poulter
- Jan Powell
- Ted Ranken
- James Reid
- Philip Richardson
- Alexander Rogers
- Horatio Ross
- Steven Scott
- Ian Shaw
- Edward Skilton
- John Stafford
- Charles Stewart
- Jackie Stewart
- William Styles
- Jesse Wallingford
- Stevan Walton
- George Whitaker
- Allen Whitty
- Peter Wilson
