= Shooting at the 1912 Summer Olympics – Men's team trap =

Olympic shooting event

Men's team trap at the Games of the V Olympiad
- Venue: Råsunda
- Dates: 29 June-1 July 1912
- Competitors: 36 from 6 nations

Medalists
1st place, gold medalist(s)		United States; Charles Billings, Edward Gleason, James Graham, Frank Hall, John H. Hendrickson, Ralph Spotts
2nd place, silver medalist(s)		Great Britain; John Butt, William Grosvenor, Harold Humby, Alexander Maunder, Charles Palmer, George Whitaker
3rd place, bronze medalist(s)		Germany; Alfred Goeldel, Horst Goeldel, Erland Koch, Albert Preuß, Erich Graf von Bernstorff, Franz von Zedlitz und Leipe

The men's trap, team (originally called clay bird shooting, team competition) was a shooting sports event held as part of the shooting at the 1912 Summer Olympics programme. It was the second appearance of the event, which had been introduced in 1908. The competition was held from Saturday, 29 June 1912 to Monday, 1 July 1912.

Thirty-six sport shooters from six nations competed.

== Results ==
Place	Team	Ind. score	Team score
1	United States		532
1	James Graham	94	532
1	Charles Billings	93	532
1	Ralph Spotts	90	532
1	John H. Hendrickson	89	532
1	Frank Hall	86	532
1	Edward Gleason	80	532
2	Great Britain		511
2	Harold Humby	91	511
2	William Grosvenor	89	511
2	Alexander Maunder	89	511
2	George Whitaker	84	511
2	John Butt	79	511
2	Charles Palmer	79	511
3	Germany		510
3	Franz von Zedlitz und Leipe	91	510
3	Horst Goeldel	88	510
3	Erich Graf von Bernstorff	87	510
3	Erland Koch	82	510
3	Albert Preuß	81	510
3	Alfred Goeldel	81	510
4	Sweden		243
4	Åke Lundeberg	48	243
4	Alfred Swahn	45	243
4	Johan Ekman	41	243
4	Victor Wallenberg	40	243
4	Hjalmar Frisell	38	243
4	Carl Wollert	31	243
5	Finland		233
5	Edvard Bacher	44	233
5	Robert Huber	43	233
5	Adolf Schnitt	41	233
5	Emil Collan	37	233
5	Karl Fazer	36	233
5	Axel Fredrik Londen	32	233
6	France		90
6	André Fleury	16	90
6	Henri de Castex	15	90
6	Georges de Crequi-Montfort	15	90
6	Charles de Jaubert	15	90
6	René Texier	15	90
6	Édoard Creuzé	14	90
