= Shooting at the 1912 Summer Olympics – Men's 50 metre rifle prone =

Olympic shooting event

Men's 50 metre rifle, prone at the Games of the V Olympiad
- Venue: Kaknäs
- Date: 4 July 1912
- Competitors: 41 from 9 nations

Medalists
1st place, gold medalist(s)		Frederick Hird	United States
2nd place, silver medalist(s)		William Milne	Great Britain
3rd place, bronze medalist(s)		Henry Burt	Great Britain

The men's 50 metre rifle from the prone position was a shooting sports event held as part of the Shooting at the 1912 Summer Olympics programme. It was the first appearance of the event. The competition was held on Thursday, 4 July 1912.

Forty-one sport shooters from nine nations competed.

== Results ==
Place	Shooter	Score
1	Frederick Hird (USA)	194
2	William Milne (GBR)	193
3	Henry Burt (GBR)	192
4	Edward Lessimore (GBR)	192
5	Francis Kemp (GBR)	190
6	Robert Murray (GBR)	190
7	William Leushner (USA)	189
8	Erik Boström (SWE)	189
9	Johan Hübner von Holst (SWE)	189
10	William Pimm (GBR)	189
11	Axel Wahlstedt (SWE)	187
12	Warren Sprout (USA)	187
13	Carl Osburn (USA)	187
14	Joseph Pepé (GBR)	187
15	Fredrik Nyström (SWE)	187
16	Arthur Nordenswan (SWE)	186
17	Eric Carlberg (SWE)	186
18	William McDonnell (USA)	186
19	Ruben Örtegren (SWE)	186
20	Ernst Johansson (SWE)	185
21	Vilhelm Carlberg (SWE)	185
22	Robert Löfman (SWE)	185
23	Ed Anderson (USA)	185
24	David Griffiths (GBR)	184
25	Nikolaos Levidis (GRE)	181
26	Frants Nielsen (DEN)	180
27	William Styles (GBR)	179
28	Erik Odelberg (SWE)	179
29	László Hauler (HUN)	178
30	Arne Sunde (NOR)	176
31	Sándor Török (HUN)	174
32	Ioannis Theofilakis (GRE)	173
33	Aleksandr Dobrzhansky (RUS)	172
34	Frangiskos Mavrommatis (GRE)	172
35	Johannes Jordell (NOR)	172
36	Vladimir Potekin (RUS)	170
37	Iakovos Theofilas (GRE)	167
38	Povl Gerlow (DEN)	167
39	Gideon Ericsson (SWE)	157
40	Ragnvald Maseng (NOR)	156
41	André Regaud (FRA)	125
