= Shooting at the 1912 Summer Olympics – Men's 25 metre small-bore rifle =

Olympic shooting event

Men's 25 metre small-bore rifle at the Games of the V Olympiad
- Venue: Kaknäs
- Date: 5 July 1912
- Competitors: 36 from 8 nations

Medalists
1st place, gold medalist(s)		Vilhelm Carlberg	Sweden
2nd place, silver medalist(s)		Johan Hübner von Holst	Sweden
3rd place, bronze medalist(s)		Gideon Ericsson	Sweden

The men's 25 metre small-bore rifle (originally called individual competition with miniature-rifle) was a shooting sports event held as part of the Shooting at the 1912 Summer Olympics programme. It was the first appearance of the event. The competition was held on Friday, 5 July 1912.

Thirty-six sport shooters from eight nations competed.

== Results ==
Place	Shooter	Hits	Score
1	Vilhelm Carlberg (SWE)	25	242
2	Johan Hübner von Holst (SWE)	25	233
3	Gideon Ericsson (SWE)	25	231
4	Joseph Pepé (GBR)	25	231
5	Robert Murray (GBR)	25	228
6	Axel Gyllenkrok (SWE)	25	227
7	William Pimm (GBR)	25	225
8	Frederick Hird (USA)	25	221
9	Henry Burt (GBR)	24	222
10	Robert Löfman (SWE)	24	221
11	Erik Odelberg (SWE)	24	219
12	Edward Lessimore (GBR)	24	218
13	William Styles (GBR)	24	216
14	William McDonnell (USA)	24	212
15	Gustaf Boivie (SWE)	24	212
16	Edwin Anderson (USA)	24	208
17	Warren Sprout (USA)	24	205
18	Frangiskos Mavrommatis (GRE)	24	204
19	Léon Johnson (FRA)	24	203
20	Eric Carlberg (SWE)	23	219
21	Ioannis Theofilakis (GRE)	23	214
22	William Milne (GBR)	23	212
23	Francis Kemp (GBR)	23	206
24	William Leushner (USA)	23	206
25	Axel Wahlstedt (SWE)	23	200
26	Aleksandr Dobrzhansky (RUS)	23	190
27	Pierre Gentil (FRA)	23	176
28	Arthur Nordenswan (SWE)	22	200
29	David Griffiths (GBR)	22	192
30	Nikolaos Levidis (GRE)	22	192
31	Povl Gerlow (DEN)	21	174
32	Vladimir Potekin (RUS)	20	171
33	Sándor Török (HUN)	18	146
34	Carl Osburn (USA)	18	146
35	Robert Jonsson (SWE)	17	143
36	Iakovos Theofilas (GRE)	14	116
