= Shooting at the 1912 Summer Olympics – Men's 100 meter running deer, single shots =

Olympic shooting event

100 meter running deer, single shots at the Games of the V Olympiad
- Venue: Råsunda
- Dates: 28 June to 1 July 1912
- Competitors: 34 from 7 nations

Medalists
1st place, gold medalist(s)		Alfred Swahn	Sweden
2nd place, silver medalist(s)		Åke Lundeberg	Sweden
3rd place, bronze medalist(s)		Nestori Toivonen	Finland

The men's 100 meter running deer, single shots was a shooting sports event held as part of the shooting at the 1912 Summer Olympics programme. It was the second appearance of the event, which had been introduced in 1908. The competition was held from Friday, 28 June 1912, to Monday, 1 July 1912.

Thirty-four sport shooters from seven nations competed.

== Results ==
Place	Shooter	Score	Shoot-off
1	Alfred Swahn (SWE)	41	20
2	Åke Lundeberg (SWE)	41	17
3	Nestori Toivonen (FIN)	41	11
4	Karl Larsson (SWE)	39	
4	Oscar Swahn (SWE)	39	
4	Anders Lindskog (SWE)	39	
7	Heinrich Elbogen (AUT)	38	
8	Adolph Cederström (SWE)	37	
8	William Leushner (USA)	37	
10	Adolf Michel (AUT)	36	
11	Johan Ekman (SWE)	34	
11	Erik Sökjer-Petersén (SWE)	34	
13	Erland Koch (GER)	33	
14	Ernst Rosenqvist (FIN)	32	
15	Gustaf Lyman (SWE)	31	
15	Vasily Skrotsky (RU1)	31	
15	Peter Paternelli (AUT)	31	
15	Axel Fredrik Londen (FIN)	31	
15	Nikolaos Levidis (GRE)	31	
20	Haralds Blaus (RU1)	29	
21	Huvi Tuiskunen (FIN)	28	
21	Iivar Väänänen (FIN)	28	
21	Albert Preuß (GER)	28	
24	Horst Goeldel (GER)	27	
24	Emil Lindewald (SWE)	27	
26	Per-Olof Arvidsson (SWE)	26	
26	Karl Reilin (FIN)	26	
26	Edward Benedicks (SWE)	26	
29	Walter Winans (USA)	24	
29	Ioannis Theofilakis (GRE)	24	
31	Dmitri Barkov (RU1)	23	
31	Eberhard Steinböck (AUT)	23	
33	Aleksandr Dobrzhansky (RU1)	22	
34	Pavel Lieth (RU1)	10	
