= Shooting at the 1912 Summer Olympics – Men's 100 meter running deer, double shots =

Olympic shooting event

100 meter running deer, double shots at the Games of the V Olympiad
- Venue: Råsunda
- Date: 3 July 1912
- Competitors: 20 from 6 nations

Medalists
1st place, gold medalist(s)		Åke Lundeberg	Sweden
2nd place, silver medalist(s)		Edward Benedicks	Sweden
3rd place, bronze medalist(s)		Oscar Swahn	Sweden

The men's 100 meter running deer, double shots was a shooting sports event held as part of the shooting at the 1912 Summer Olympics programme. It was the second appearance of the event, which had been introduced in 1908. The competition was held on July 3, 1912.

Twenty sport shooters from six nations competed.

== Results ==
Place	Shooter	Score
1	Åke Lundeberg (SWE)	79
2	Edward Benedicks (SWE)	74
3	Oscar Swahn (SWE)	72
4	Alfred Swahn (SWE)	68
4	Per-Olof Arvidsson (SWE)	68
6	Anders Lindskog (SWE)	67
7	Erik Sökjer-Petersén (SWE)	65
8	Emil Lindewald (SWE)	64
9	Gustaf Lyman (SWE)	61
10	Charles de Jaubert (FRA)	60
11	Walter Winans (USA)	59
12	Hjalmar Frisell (SWE)	58
12	Johan Ekman (SWE)	58
14	Wilhelm Dybäck (SWE)	57
15	William Leushner (USA)	49
16	Heinrich Elbogen (AUT)	48
17	Erland Koch (GER)	47
17	Albert Preuß (GER)	47
19	Dmitri Barkov (RUS)	39
20	Vasily Skrotsky (RUS)	32
