= Shooting at the 1912 Summer Olympics – Men's 100 meter team running deer, single shots =

Olympic shooting event

100 meter team running deer, single shots at the Games of the V Olympiad
- Venue: Råsunda
- Date: 4 July 1912
- Competitors: 20 from 5 nations

Medalists
1st place, gold medalist(s)		Sweden; Per-Olof Arvidsson, Åke Lundeberg, Alfred Swahn, Oscar Swahn
2nd place, silver medalist(s)		United States; William Leushner, William Libbey, William McDonnell, Walter Winans
3rd place, bronze medalist(s)		Finland; Axel Fredrik Londen, Ernst Rosenqvist, Nestori Toivonen, Iivar Väänänen

The men's 100 meter team running deer, single shots was a shooting sports event held as part of the shooting at the 1912 Summer Olympics programme. It was the second appearance of the event, which had been introduced in 1908. The competition was held on Thursday, 4 July 1912.

Twenty sport shooters from five nations competed.

Oscar Swahn was 64 years and 258 days old when he won gold as part of the Swedish team. This remains the record for the oldest person to win Olympic gold.

== Results ==
Place	Team	Ind. score	Team score
1	Sweden		151
1	Oscar Swahn	43	151
1	Åke Lundeberg	39	151
1	Alfred Swahn	37	151
1	Per-Olof Arvidsson	32	151
2	United States		132
2	Walter Winans	39	132
2	William Leushner	38	132
2	William Libbey	37	132
2	William McDonnell	18	132
3	Finland		123
3	Nestori Toivonen	38	123
3	Iivar Väänänen	30	123
3	Axel Fredrik Londen	29	123
3	Ernst Rosenqvist	26	123
4	Austria		115
4	Peter Paternelli	34	115
4	Adolf Michel	33	115
4	Heinrich Elbogen	29	115
4	Eberhard Steinböck	19	115
5	Russian Empire		108
5	Vasily Skrotsky	36	108
5	Dmitri Barkov	26	108
5	Harry Blau	23	108
5	Aleksandr Dobrzhansky	23	108
