= Shooting at the 1912 Summer Olympics – Men's trap =

Men's trap at the Games of the V Olympiad
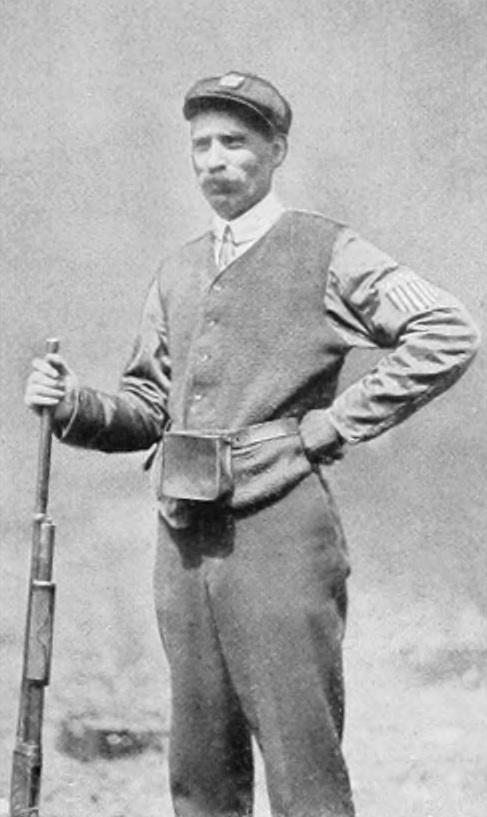
- Gold medalist James Graham
- Venue: Råsunda
- Dates: 2–4 July 1912
- Competitors: 61 from 11 nations
- Winning score: 96 OR

Medalists
| 1st place, gold medalist(s) | | James Graham | United States |
| 2nd place, silver medalist(s) | | Alfred Goeldel | Germany |
| 3rd place, bronze medalist(s) | | Harry Blau | Russian Empire |

The men's trap (originally called clay bird shooting) was a shooting sports event held as part of the shooting at the 1912 Summer Olympics programme. It was the third appearance of the event, which had been introduced in 1900. The competition was held from Tuesday, 2 July 1912 to Thursday, 4 July 1912. Each nation could send up to 12 shooters. Sixty-one sport shooters from eleven nations competed. The event was won by James Graham of the United States. Silver went to Alfred Goeldel of Germany and bronze to Haralds Blaus of the Russian Empire. Each of the nations on the podium was making its debut in the event. Graham also received Lord Westbury's Cup, a challenge prize instituted in 1908.

== Background ==
This was the third appearance of what would become standardised as the men's ISSF Olympic trap event. The event was held at every Summer Olympics from 1896 to 1924 (except 1904, when no shooting events were held) and from 1952 to 2016; it was open to women from 1968 to 1996.

Three of the top 10 shooters from 1908 returned: bronze medalists Alexander Maunder of Great Britain and Anastasios Metaxas of Greece and fifth-place finisher Charles Palmer of Great Britain.

Germany, Norway, the Russian Empire, and the United States each made their debut in the event. France and Great Britain both made their third appearance, having competed at both prior editions of the event.

== Competition format ==
Shooter faced up to 100 clay pigeons over the course of three stages. The first stage consisted of 20 targets, in 2 series of 10. The top 50% of shooters advanced to the second stage. That stage had 30 targets, in 2 series of 15. The top 50% of shooters by combined score of the two stages advanced to the third stage (that is, 25% of the initial starters). The final stage had 50 targets, in 2 series of 20 and 2 series of 5. Ties were broken, as necessary, by a series of 10.

There were three traps. The firing line was 15 metres away from the traps. The minimum gauge of the shotgun was 12. Two shots were allowed per clay pigeon.

== Records ==
Prior to this competition, the existing world and Olympic records were as follows.

| World record | |
| Olympic record | New format |

James Graham set the initial Olympic record for the 100-shot event with 96 points.

== Schedule ==
| Date | Time | Round |
|---|---|---|
| Tuesday, 2 July 1912 | | First stage |
| Wednesday, 3 July 1912 | | Second stage |
| Thursday, 4 July 1912 | | Final stage |

== Results ==
The first round saw a four-way tie between Graham, Gleason, von Zedlitz und Leipe, and Horst Goeldel at 19 points. Graham and Gleason remained tied for first after the first two rounds, each hitting 28 that round for a two-round total of 47. Graham was the highest scorer once again in the third round (this time with Blaus tying him) at 49 points to take gold; Gleason, however, had a poor round at only 40. Alfred Goeldel, one point behind the leaders after one round and matching them in the second to stay one point behind, lost another point against Graham to finish 2 back and in silver, holding off Blaus (who had started the last round 4 points behind Alfred Goeldel and could only narrow the gap by 1).

| Rank | Shooter | Nation | Score |
|---|---|---|---|
| 1st place, gold medalist(s) | James Graham | United States | 96 |
| 2nd place, silver medalist(s) | Alfred Goeldel | Germany | 94 |
| 3rd place, bronze medalist(s) | Haralds Blaus | Russian Empire | 91 |
| 4 | Harold Humby | Great Britain | 88 |
| 4 | Albert Preuß | Germany | 88 |
| 4 | Anastasios Metaxas | Greece | 88 |
| 4 | Franz von Zedlitz und Leipe | Germany | 88 |
| 4 | Adolf Schnitt | Finland | 88 |
| 9 | Emile Jurgens | Netherlands | 87 |
| 9 | Ralph Spotts | United States | 87 |
| 9 | Edward Gleason | United States | 87 |
| 12 | Erland Koch | Germany | 86 |
| 12 | Karl Fazer | Finland | 86 |
| 12 | Horst Goeldel | Germany | 86 |
| 12 | Frank Hall | United States | 86 |
| 16 | William Grosvenor | Great Britain | 85 |
| 17 | Robert Hutcheson | Canada | 84 |
| 17 | Erich Graf von Bernstorff | Germany | 84 |
| 17 | John Butt | Great Britain | 84 |
| 17 | Åke Lundeberg | Sweden | 84 |
| 21 | Charles Palmer | Great Britain | 82 |
| 21 | Alfred Swahn | Sweden | 82 |
| 23 | Leonardus Syttin | Russian Empire | 81 |
| 23 | Frantz Rosenberg | Norway | 81 |
| 25 | Hans Lüttich | Germany | 77 |
| 25 | Charles de Jaubert | France | 77 |
| 27 | André Fleury | France | 74 |
| 27 | Carsten Henrik Bruun | Norway | 74 |
| 29 | Henri de Castex | France | 38 |
| 29 | Robert Huber | Finland | 38 |
| 29 | Hjalmar Frisell | Sweden | 38 |
| 29 | Emil Collan | Finland | 38 |
| 29 | George Whitaker | Great Britain | 38 |
| 34 | Victor Wallenberg | Sweden | 37 |
| 35 | Georges de Crequi-Montfort | France | 36 |
| 35 | Walter Bodneck | Russian Empire | 36 |
| 35 | Daniel McMahon | United States | 36 |
| 38 | Edward Benedicks | Sweden | 34 |
| 39 | George Pinchard | Great Britain | 33 |
| 40 | Johan Ekman | Sweden | 31 |
| 41 | Édoard Creuzé | France | 14 |
| 41 | Charles W. Billings | United States | 14 |
| 41 | Herman Eriksson | Sweden | 14 |
| 41 | John H. Hendrickson | United States | 14 |
| 45 | James Kenyon | Canada | 13 |
| 45 | William Davies | Canada | 13 |
| 45 | Edvard Bacher | Finland | 13 |
| 45 | René Texier | France | 13 |
| 45 | Alexander Maunder | Great Britain | 13 |
| 45 | Herman Nyberg | Sweden | 13 |
| 51 | Henri le Marié | France | 12 |
| 51 | Pavel Lieth | Russian Empire | 12 |
| 53 | Alfred Black | Great Britain | 11 |
| 53 | Emil Fabritius | Finland | 11 |
| 53 | Boris Pertel | Russian Empire | 11 |
| 56 | John Goodwin | Great Britain | 10 |
| 56 | Oscar Swahn | Sweden | 10 |
| 56 | Otto Bökman | Sweden | 10 |
| 56 | Carl Wollert | Sweden | 10 |
| 56 | Nils Klein | Sweden | 10 |
| 61 | Alfred Stabell | Norway | 3 |
