= Dmitry Barkov =

Dmitry Barkov may refer to:

- Dmitry Barkov (footballer) (born 1992), Russian footballer
- Dmitri Barkov (sport shooter) (1880–?), Russian sport shooter
