= B. M. Higginson Jr. =

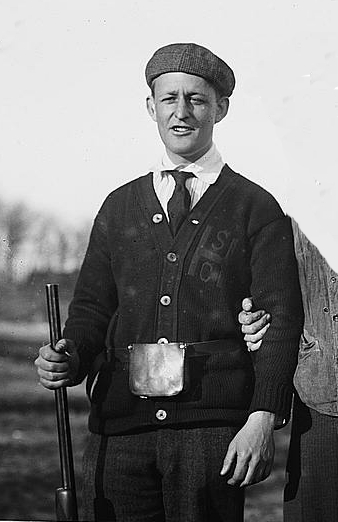
Higginson in 1912

B. M. Higginson Jr. was the American national clay pigeon shooting champion in 1912. He was a Harvard University graduate and a member of the New York Athletic Club. Coming in second in 1912 was the 1905 champion John H. Hendrickson.
