= Joseph Pepe =

Joseph Pepe may refer to:

- Joseph Pepé (1881–1970), English sport shooter
- Joseph A. Pepe (born 1942), American prelate of the Roman Catholic Church
