= André Regaud =

French sport shooter

Personal information
- Born: 14 February 1868 Lyon, France
- Died: 12 January 1945 (aged 76) Paris, France

Sport
- Sport: Sport shooting
Medal record
Men's shooting
Representing France
Olympic Games
Bronze medal – third place	1908 London	Small-bore rifle

André Regaud (14 February 1868 – 12 January 1945) was a French shooter who competed at the 1908 Summer Olympics, the 1912 Summer Olympics and the 1920 Summer Olympics.

He was born in Lyon and died in Paris.

In 1908, he won a bronze medal with the French team in the small-bore rifle event. He also finished fourth with the French team in the team pistol competition and tenth in the individual pistol event.

In the 1912 Summer Olympics, he participated in the following events:

- Team small-bore rifle – fourth place
- 50 metre pistol – 15th place
- 50 metre rifle, prone – 41st place

And in the 1920 Summer Olympics he participated in the following events:

- Team military pistol – fifth place
- Team free pistol – sixth place
