= Robert Hutcheson =

Canadian sports shooter

Personal information
- Born: 9 May 1870 Montreal, Canada
- Died: 7 September 1939 (aged 69) Montreal, Canada

Sport
- Sport: Sports shooting

Robert Hutcheson (9 May 1870 – 7 September 1939) was a Canadian sports shooter. He competed in the men's trap event at the 1912 Summer Olympics. He died after being struck by an automobile.
