= Shooting at the 1908 Summer Olympics – Men's team small-bore rifle =

Sports shooting at the Olympics

Men's team small-bore rifle at the Games of the IV Olympiad
- Venue: Bisley rifle range
- Date: 11 July 1908
- Competitors: 12 from 3 nations

Medalists
1st place, gold medalist(s)		Great Britain; Edward Amoore, Harold Humby, Maurice Matthews, William Pimm
2nd place, silver medalist(s)		Sweden; Eric Carlberg, Vilhelm Carlberg, Johan Hübner von Holst, Franz-Albert Schartau
3rd place, bronze medalist(s)		France; Henri Bonnefoy, Paul Colas, Léon Lécuyer, André Regaud

The men's team small-bore rifle was one of 15 events on the Shooting at the 1908 Summer Olympics programme. Teams consisted of four shooters. Regulation of the equipment used in the event was done through proscribing ammunition weighing more than 140 grains, with a velocity of more than 1,450 feet per second, or having a hard metal base. Magnifying and telescopic sights were prohibited. Each shooter fired 40 shots, half at 50 yards and half at 100 yards. Maximum score for a shot was 5 points, giving a maximum total possible of 200 points per shooter or 800 per team.

The event would be held again in 1912, though only at 50 metres. A similar team event, standing at 50 metres, would be held in 1920.

== Results ==
Place	Nation	Shooter	Score		
Place	Nation	Shooter	50 yd	100 yd	Total
1	Great Britain	Team total	387	384	771
1	Great Britain	Maurice Matthews	98	98	196
1	Great Britain	Harold Humby	97	97	194
1	Great Britain	William Pimm	99	93	192
1	Great Britain	Edward Amoore	93	96	189
2	Sweden	Team total	373	364	737
2	Sweden	Vilhelm Carlberg	95	92	187
2	Sweden	Franz-Albert Schartau	96	90	186
2	Sweden	Johan Hübner von Holst	94	90	184
2	Sweden	Eric Carlberg	88	92	180
3	France	Team total	359	351	710
3	France	Paul Colas	96	93	189
3	France	André Regaud	91	95	186
3	France	Léon Lécuyer	85	84	169
3	France	Henri Bonnefoy	87	79	166

== Sources ==
- Cook, Theodore Andrea (1908). The Fourth Olympiad, Being the Official Report. London: British Olympic Association.
- De Wael, Herman (2001). "Shooting 1908". Herman's Full Olympians.
