= Arthur Nordenswan =

Swedish sport shooter

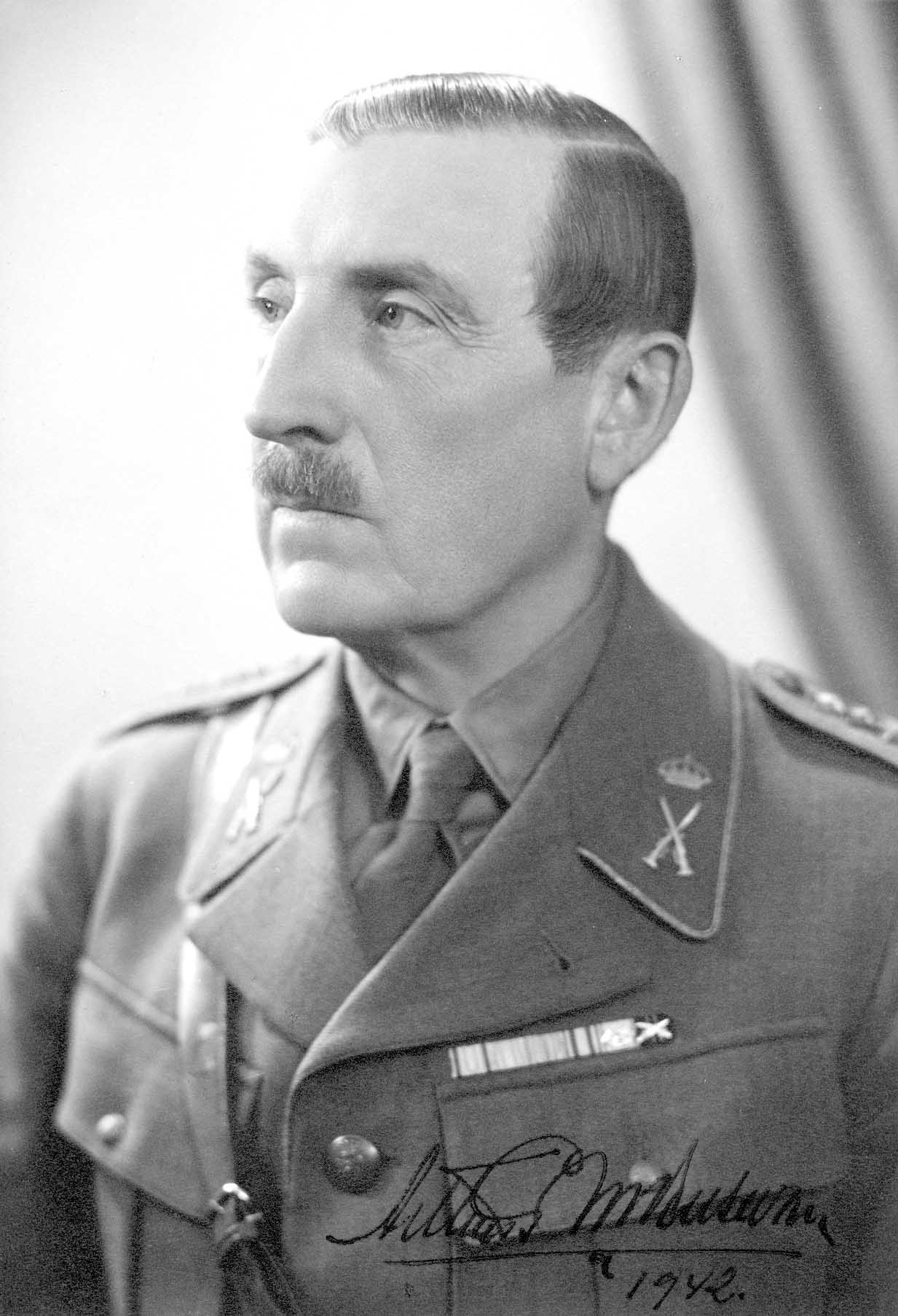
- Born: Arthur Georg Nordenswan; 27 January 1883; Stockholm, Sweden
- Died: 29 December 1970 (aged 87); Stockholm, Sweden
- Military career
- Allegiance: Sweden; Finland
- Branch: Swedish Army
- Service years: 1902–40, 1940–42 (Sweden); 1940 (Finland)
- Rank: Colonel
- Units: Svea Life Guards; Västernorrland Regiment; Norrbotten Regiment; Swedish Volunteer Corps; Skaraborg Regiment
- Commands: Skaraborg Regiment
- Conflicts: Winter War
- Sports career
Medal record
Men's shooting
Representing Sweden
Olympic Games
| Silver medal – second place | 1912 Stockholm | Team 50 m small-bore rifle |

Arthur Georg Nordenswan (27 January 1883 – 29 December 1970) was a Swedish Army officer and sport shooter who competed in the 1912 Summer Olympics.

== Early life ==
Nordenswan was born on 27 January 1883 in Stockholm, Sweden, the son of major general Carl Otto Nordensvan and Ebba Maria (née Wallenius).

== Career ==
=== Military career ===
Nordenswan was commissioned as an officer in 1902 and was assigned to Svea Life Guards (I 1) as a second lieutenant the same year. He became a lieutenant there in 1905. Nordenswan was promoted to captain in 1916 and served in Västernorrland Regiment (I 28) in 1921. He was promoted to major and served in Norrbotten Regiment (I 19) in 1926 and was promoted to lieutenant colonel in 1930 and served in Skaraborg Regiment (I 9) in 1932.

Nordenswan was commanding officer of the Swedish troops in the Territory of the Saar Basin in connection with the referendum in 1935. He was then promoted to colonel and served as commanding officer of the Skaraborg Regiment from 1935 to 1942. During 1940 Nordenswan became colonel in the Finnish Army and commanded the Swedish Volunteer Corps' battlegroup at the Salla Front during the Winter War in Finland.

=== Sports career ===
In 1912, he won the silver medal as a member of the Swedish team in the team 50 metre small-bore rifle competition. In the 50 metre rifle, prone event he finished 16th, and in the 25 metre small-bore rifle competition he finished 28th.

== Personal life ==
In 1909, he married Inez Kjerner (born 1883), the daughter of Doctor of Medicine Karl Kjerner and Emelie Magnell. They divorced and in 1918 Nordenswan married Ruth Persson (1893–1975), the daughter of farmer Peter Persson and Anna Eriksson.

== Death ==
Nordenswan died on 29 December 1970 in Stockholm and was buried at Norra begravningsplatsen in Stockholm.

== Awards and decorations ==
Nordenswan's awards:

=== Swedish ===
- (Sweden) Commander 1st Class of the Order of the Sword (15 November 1941)
- (Sweden) King Gustaf V's Olympic Medal
- (Sweden) Skaraborg Landsturm Association's gold medal (Skaraborgs landstormsförbunds guldmedalj)
- (Sweden) Skaraborg Shooting Federation's gold medal (Skaraborgs skytteförbunds guldmedalj)
- (Sweden) Swedish Military Sports Association's gold medal (Sveriges militära idrottsförbunds guldmedalj)
- (Sweden) Gold Medal of the Society for the Promotion of Ski Sport and Open Air Life (Skid- och friluftsfrämjandets i Sveriges guldmedalj)

=== Foreign ===
- (Finland) Second Class of the Order of the Cross of Liberty with swords
- (Russian Empire) Knight 3rd Class of the Order of Saint Stanislaus
- Cross of Merit of the Protection Corps of Finland (Finska skyddskårernas förtjänstkors)
- (Finland) Finnish War Memorial Medal
