= Gideon Ericsson =

Swedish sport shooter

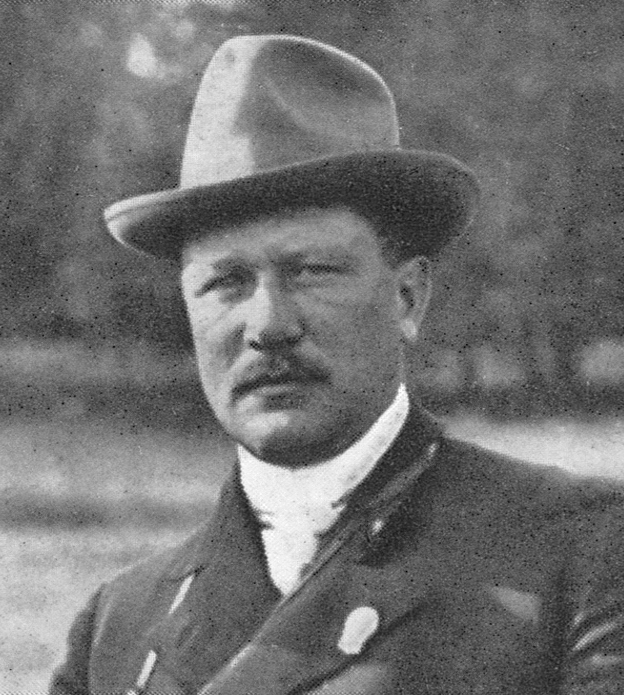

Personal information
- Born: 2 March 1871 Stockholm, Sweden
- Died: 27 January 1936 (aged 64) Stockholm, Sweden

Sport
- Sport: Sports shooting
- Club: Stockholms PK
Medal record
Representing Sweden
Olympic Games
Bronze medal – third place	1912 Stockholm	25 m small-bore rifle

Gideon Levi Ericsson (2 March 1871 – 27 January 1936) was a Swedish sport shooter who competed in the 1912 Summer Olympics. He won a bronze medal in the 25 m small-bore rifle event and finished 37th–39th in the 50 m pistol and 50 m rifle, prone events.
