= Hans Denver =

Danish sport shooter (1876–1961)

Personal information
- Born: 28 October 1876 Osted, Sjælland, Denmark
- Died: 18 September 1961 (aged 84) Copenhagen, Denmark

Sport
- Sport: Sport shooting

Hans Peter Christian Denver (28 October 1876 – 18 September 1961) was a Danish sport shooter who competed in the 1912 Summer Olympics.

He was born in Osted, Lejre, and died in Copenhagen.

In 1912, Denver was a member of the Danish team, which finished fifth in the 50 metre team small-bore rifle competition. He also participated in the 300 metre free rifle, three positions event but did not finish the contest.
