= Eberhard Steinböck =

Austrian sport shooter

Personal information
- Born: 30 November 1882 Spittal an der Drau, Austria-Hungary
- Died: 3 April 1970 (aged 87)

Sport
- Sport: Sport shooting

Eberhard Steinböck (30 November 1882 – 3 April 1970) was an Austrian sport shooter who competed in the 1912 Summer Olympics.

He was born in Spittal an der Drau. In 1912, he was a member of the Austrian team, which finished fourth in the team 100 metre running deer, single shots competition. In the 100 metre running deer, single shots event he finished 31st.
