= Haralds Blaus =

Latvian sport shooter (1885–1944)

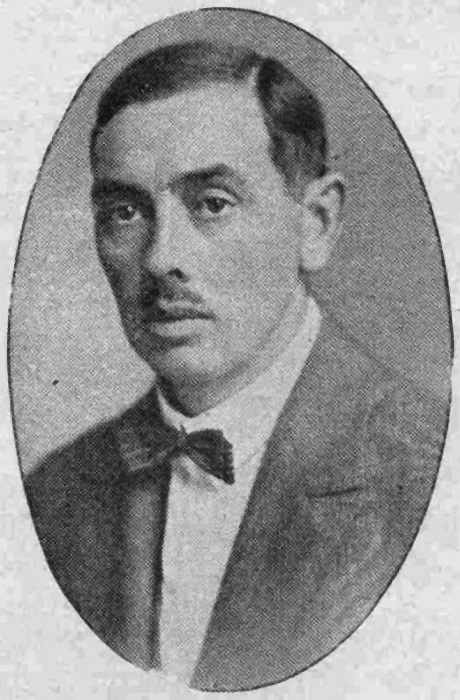

Personal information
- Full name: Harald Carl Adolf Blau
- Born: 5 February 1885 Liezēre parish, Governorate of Livonia, Russian Empire (Now Madona Municipality, Latvia)
- Died: 4 August 1944 (aged 59) Augsburg, Allied-occupied Germany

Sport
- Sport: Sport shooting
Medal record
Men's shooting
Representing Russia
Olympic Games
Bronze medal – third place	1912 Stockholm	trap

Harald "Harry" Blau (German: Harald "Harry" Carl Adolf Blau, Latvian: Haralds Kārlis Ādolfs Blaus, Russian: Гарольд Карлович Блау; 5 February 1885 – 8 August 1944) was a sport shooter of Baltic German origin who competed in the 1912 Summer Olympics representing the Russian Empire. He won the bronze medal in the trap event. He also competed in the 100 metre running deer, single shots event finishing 20th and as part of the 100 metre running deer, single shots team finishing fifth.
