= Frants Nielsen =

Danish sports shooter (1874–1961)

Personal information
- Born: 22 January 1874 Alum, Purhus Municipality, Denmark
- Died: 6 June 1961 (aged 87) Randers, Denmark

Sport
- Sport: Sports shooting

Frants Nielsen (22 January 1874 – 6 June 1961) was a Danish sports shooter who competed in the 1912 Summer Olympics. He was born in Alum, Purhus Municipality, and died in Randers.

In 1912, at the Stockholm Games, he participated in the following events:

- 50 metre team small-bore rifle – fifth place
- 50 metre rifle, prone – 26th place
- 50 metre pistol – 40th place
- 300 metre free rifle, three positions – 46th place
