= Iakovos Theofilas =

Greek sport shooter

Personal information
- Born: 22 October 1861 Athens, Greece

Sport
- Sport: Sport shooting

Iakovos Theofilas (Greek: Ιάκωβος Θεοφιλάς, born 22 October 1861, date of death unknown) was a Greek sport shooter. He competed in the 1906 Summer Olympics and in the 1912 Summer Olympics.

== Career ==
Theofilas was born in Athens.

In 1906, he finished 18th in the free rifle, free position event. He also participated in the 200 m army rifle competition but did not finish the contest. Six years later at the 1912 Summer Olympics he participated in the following events:

- Team 25 metre small-bore rifle – fourth place
- Team 50 metre small-bore rifle – fifth place
- Team military rifle – seventh place
- 25 metre small-bore rifle – 36th place
- 50 metre rifle, prone – 37th place
- 300 metre military rifle, three positions – 72nd place
- 600 metre free rifle – 85th place
