= Emil Lindewald =

Swedish sport shooter

Personal information
- Born: 14 September 1858 Övergran, Håbo Municipality, Sweden
- Died: 31 May 1921 (aged 62) Stockholm, Sweden

Sport
- Sport: Sport shooting

Emil Vilhelm Lindewald (14 September 1858 – 13 May 1921) was a Swedish sport shooter who competed in the 1912 Summer Olympics.

He was born in Övergran, Håbo Municipality. In 1912 he finished eighth in the 100 metre running deer, double shots competition and 24th in the 100 metre running deer, single shots event.
