= Otto Bökman =

Swedish sports shooter

Personal information
- Born: 3 May 1874 Västra Götaland, Sweden
- Died: 22 November 1938 (aged 64) Västra Götaland, Sweden

Sport
- Sport: Sports shooting

Otto Bökman (3 May 1874 – 22 November 1938) was a Swedish sports shooter. He competed in the men's trap event at the 1912 Summer Olympics.
