= Maxime Landin =

French sport shooter

Personal information
- Born: 24 April 1855 Bagnolet, France

Sport
- Sport: Sport shooting

Maxime Landin (24 April 1855 - 21 March 1942) was a French sport shooter who competed in the 1912 Summer Olympics.

He was born in Bagnolet. In 1912, he was a member of the French team which finished fourth in the team 50 metre small-bore rifle and fifth in the team rifle. In the 300 metre military rifle, three positions, he finished 70th.
