= Wilhelm Dybäck =

Swedish sports shooter

Personal information
- Born: 11 May 1877 Gävle, Sweden
- Died: 22 September 1933 (aged 56) Dalarna, Sweden

Sport
- Sport: Sports shooting

Wilhelm Dybäck (11 May 1877 – 22 September 1933) was a Swedish sports shooter. He competed in the 100m running deer, double shot event at the 1912 Summer Olympics.
