= Peter Paternelli =

Austrian sport shooter (1856–?)

Personal information
- Born: 10 March 1856 Strigno, Austrian Empire

Sport
- Sport: Sport shooting

Peter Paternelli (born 10 March 1856, date of death unknown) was an Austrian sport shooter who competed in the 1912 Summer Olympics.

He was born in Strigno. In 1912, he was a member of the Austrian team, which finished fourth in the team 100 metre running deer, single shots competition. In the 100 metre running deer, single shots event, he finished 15th.
