= Erland Koch (German sport shooter) =

German sport shooter

Personal information
- Born: 3 January 1867 Günsdorf, Kingdom of Prussia, North German Confederation
- Died: 29 April 1945 (aged 78) Berlin, Nazi Germany

Sport
- Sport: Sport shooting
Medal record
Men's shooting
Representing Germany
Olympic Games
Bronze medal – third place	1912 Stockholm	team trap

Erland Koch (3 January 1867 – 29 April 1945) was a German sport shooter who competed in the 1912 Summer Olympics.

He won the bronze medal in the team trap event. He also competed in the running deer, single shots event and finished thirteenth. In the running deer, double shots event he finished 17th, and in the trap competition he finished twelfth.

He was killed in action during World War II.
