= Gustaf Boivie =

Swedish sport shooter (1864–1951)

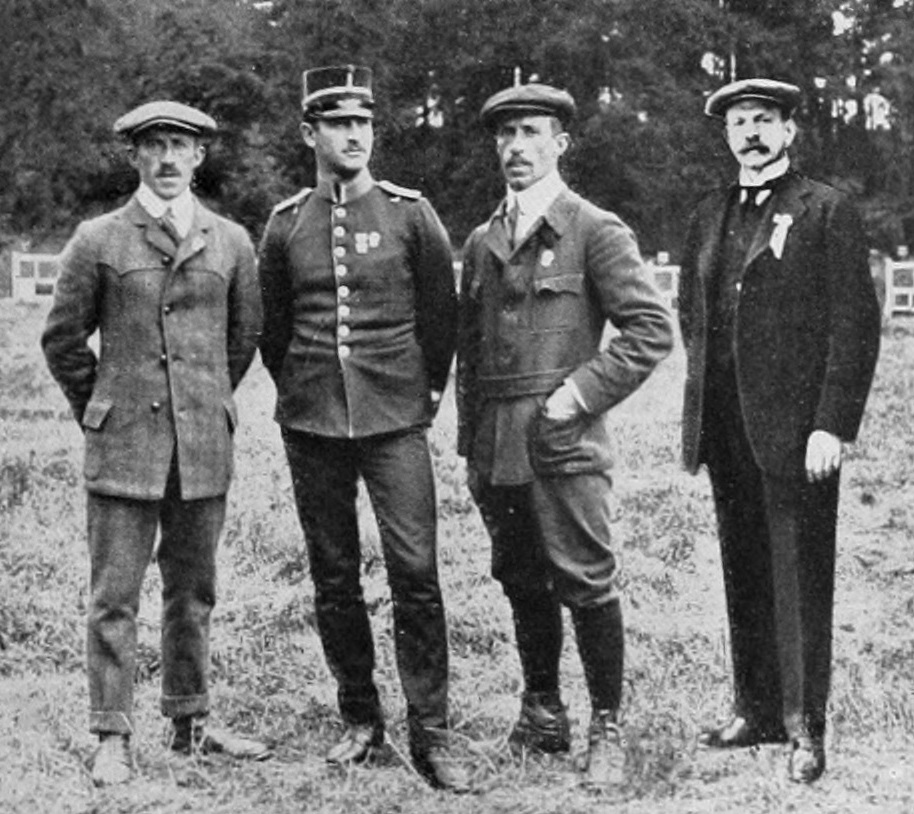
- Gustaf Boivie (right) at the 1912 Olympics

Personal information
- Nationality: Swedish
- Born: 27 November 1864 Stockholm, Sweden
- Died: 12 January 1951 (aged 86) Ängelholm, Sweden

Sport
- Country: Sweden
- Sport: Shooting
- Club: Stockholms PK
Medal record
Representing Sweden
Olympic Games
Gold medal – first place	1912 Stockholm	Team 25 m small-bore rifle

Gustaf Carl Fredrik Boivie (27 November 1864 – 12 January 1951) was a Swedish sport shooter who competed at the 1912 Summer Olympics. He won the gold medal in the team 25 m small-bore rifle competition. He also participated in the following events:

- 30 metre rapid fire pistol – eleventh place
- 25 metre small-bore rifle – 15th place
- 50 metre pistol – 42nd place
