= Vasily Skrotsky =

Russian sport shooter

Personal information
- Born: 1 January 1878 Palnyz, Russian Empire

Sport
- Sport: Sports shooting

Vasily Skrotsky (Russian: Василий Скроцкий, born 1 January 1878 (unknown OS/NS), date of death unknown) was a Russian Empire sport shooter who competed in the 1912 Summer Olympics.

In the 1912 Summer Olympics he participated in the following events:

- Team running deer, single shots – fifth place
- running deer, single shots – 15th place
- running deer, double shots – 20th place
