= Axel Fredrik Londen =

Finnish sport shooter (1859–1928)

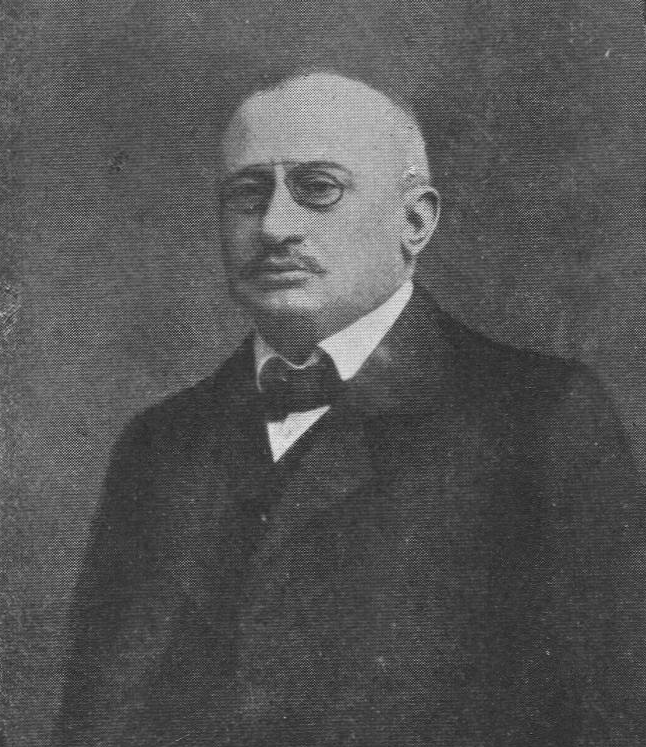

Personal information
- National team: Finland
- Born: 5 August 1859 Hamina, Grand Duchy of Finland, Russian Empire
- Died: 8 September 1928 (aged 69) Helsinki, Finland
- Education: Varatuomari
- Occupation: Corporate lawyer
- Spouses: Valborg Ferlmann (1895–1919); Maria Elisabet Magnuson (1920–)
- Other interests: Hunting

Sport
- Sport: Sports shooting
- Club: Suomen Metsästysyhdistys
Medal record
Men's shooting
Representing (Russia) Finland
Olympic Games
Bronze medal – third place	1912 Stockholm	Running deer, team

Axel Fredrik Londen (5 August 1859 – 8 September 1928) was a Finnish sports shooter, who competed in the 1912 Summer Olympics.

== Olympics ==
Axel Fredrik Londen at the Olympic Games
Games	Event	Rank	Notes
1908 Summer Olympics	Trap	29th–61st	Sources differ: according to some, he did not start the event, according to others, he was eliminated in the first stage of the competition
1912 Summer Olympics	100 meter running deer, single shots	15th	
1912 Summer Olympics	100 meter team running deer, single shots	3rd	
1912 Summer Olympics	Trap, team	5th	

He was a member of the board of the Finnish Olympic Committee in 1907–1908 and 1911–1913.

== Biography ==
His parents were vicar and rural dean Karl Fredrik Londen and Emilia Nordenstreng. His was married to Valborg Ferlmann in 1895–1919 and to Maria Elisabet Magnuson since 1920.

He obtained a legal degree in 1886 and the title of varatuomari in 1889.

He moved to Sweden to manage a tobacco factory in the 1910s and got their citizenship. He moved back to Finland after bankruptcy.

He was the chairman of the shooting club Suomen Metsästysyhdistys in 1911–1917.

He edited the outdoors magazine Metsästys ja Kalastus.

He was the first executive manager of the Finnish Hunters' Association in 1922–1927. According to himself, he shot at least two bears and 17 mooses.

He also was briefly the mayor of Ekenäs and held various jobs in the Finnish government.

He was the secretary of the Finnish Maritime Administration from 1924 up to his death.

== Sources ==
- Siukonen, Markku (2001). Urheilukunniamme puolustajat. Suomen olympiaedustajat 1906–2000. Suuri olympiateos (in Finnish). Jyväskylä: Graface. p. 189. ISBN 951-98673-1-7.
- Axel Fredrik Londen at Olympedia
