= Horst Goeldel-Bronikoven =

German sport shooter

Horst Göldel
Personal information
- Born: 7 June 1883 Lengainen, Prussia, German Empire

Sport
- Sport: Sport shooting
Medal record
Men's shooting
Representing Germany
Olympic Games
Bronze medal – third place	1912 Stockholm	team trap

Horst Göldel-Bronikowen (born 7 June 1883, date of death unknown) was a German sport shooter who competed in the 1912 Summer Olympics.

He won the bronze medal in the team trap event. He also competed in the trap competition and finished twelfth and in the 100 metre running deer, single shots event he finished 24th.

Göldel was born in Lengainen, Prussia (now Poland), to Max and Hertha Göldel, and baptised in Wartenburg in Ostpreußen. He was the younger brother of Alfred Göldel-Bronikoven.
