= Adolf Michel =

Austrian sport shooter

Personal information
- Born: 12 February 1876 Vienna, Austria
- Died: 24 April 1928 (aged 52)

Sport
- Sport: Sport shooting

Adolf Michel (12 February 1876 – 24 April 1928) was an Austrian sport shooter who competed in the 1912 Summer Olympics. Michel was born in Vienna. In 1912, he was a member of the Austrian team, which finished fourth in the team 100 metre running deer, single shots competition. He finished tenth in the 100 metre running deer, single shots event.
