= Povl Gerlow =

Danish sport shooter (1881–1959)

Personal information
- Born: 19 August 1881 Vig, Trundholm, Zealand, Denmark
- Died: 1 June 1959 (aged 77) Copenhagen, Denmark

Sport
- Sport: Sport shooting

Povl Gerlow (19 August 1881 – 1 June 1959) was a Danish sport shooter who competed in the 1912 Summer Olympics and in the 1920 Summer Olympics.

He was born in Vig, Trundholm, Zealand and died in Copenhagen.

In 1912, at the Stockholm Games, he participated in the following events:

- 50 metre team small-bore rifle – fifth place
- 25 metre small-bore rifle – 31st place
- 50 metre rifle, prone – 38th place
- 300 metre free rifle, three positions – 60th place
- 300 metre military rifle, three positions – 74th place

Eight years later, he finished eighth in the 600 metre military rifle, prone competition at the Antwerp Games.
