= Shooting at the 1912 Summer Olympics – Men's 25 metre team small-bore rifle =

Olympic shooting event

Men's 25 metre team small-bore rifle at the Games of the V Olympiad
- Venue: Kaknäs
- Date: 5 July 1912
- Competitors: 16 from 4 nations

Medalists
| 1st place, gold medalist(s) | | Gustaf Boivie, Eric Carlberg, Vilhelm Carlberg, Johan Hübner von Holst; Sweden |
| 2nd place, silver medalist(s) | | William Milne, Joseph Pepé, William Pimm, William Styles; Great Britain |
| 3rd place, bronze medalist(s) | | Frederick Hird, William Leushner, William McDonnell, Warren Sprout; United States |

The men's 25 metre team small-bore rifle (originally called team competition with miniature-rifle) was a shooting sports event held as part of the shooting at the 1912 Summer Olympics programme. It was the first appearance of the event, though a mixed-distance team small-bore rifle event had been held in 1908. The competition was held on Friday, 5 July 1912.

Sixteen sport shooters from four nations competed.

== Results ==
| Place | Team | Ind. score | Team score |
|---|---|---|---|
| 1 | Sweden | | 925 |
| 1 | Johan Hübner von Holst | 238 | 925 |
| 1 | Eric Carlberg | 238 | 925 |
| 1 | Vilhelm Carlberg | 229 | 925 |
| 1 | Gustaf Boivie | 220 | 925 |
| 2 | Great Britain | | 917 |
| 2 | William Pimm | 237 | 917 |
| 2 | Joseph Pepé | 235 | 917 |
| 2 | William Milne | 226 | 917 |
| 2 | William Styles | 219 | 917 |
| 3 | United States | | 881 |
| 3 | Frederick Hird | 227 | 881 |
| 3 | Warren Sprout | 221 | 881 |
| 3 | William McDonnell | 217 | 881 |
| 3 | William Leushner | 216 | 881 |
| 4 | Greece | | 716 |
| 4 | Ioannis Theofilakis | 211 | 716 |
| 4 | Frangiskos Mavrommatis | 187 | 716 |
| 4 | Nikolaos Levidis | 185 | 716 |
| 4 | Iakovos Theofilas | 133 | 716 |
