= Iivar Väänänen =

Finnish sport shooter

Personal information
- Born: 17 September 1887 Kuopion maalaiskunta, Finland
- Died: 13 April 1959 (aged 71) Kuopion maalaiskunta, Finland

Sport
- Sport: Sport shooting
Medal record
Men's shooting
Representing Finland
Olympic Games
Bronze medal – third place	1912 Stockholm	Running dear, team

Iivar "Iivo" Väänänen (17 September 1887 – 13 April 1959) was a Finnish sport shooter who competed in the 1912 Summer Olympics.

He was part of the Finnish team, which won the bronze medal in the 100 metre running deer, single shots event. He also competed in the 100 metre running deer, single shots event and finished 21st.
