= Albert Preuß =

German sport shooter

Personal information
- Born: 29 January 1864 Axien, Kingdom of Prussia, German Confederation

Sport
- Sport: Sport shooting
Medal record
Men's shooting
Representing Germany
Olympic Games
Bronze medal – third place	1912 Stockholm	Team trap

Albert Preuß (born 29 January 1864, date of death unknown) was a German sport shooter who competed in the 1912 Summer Olympics.

He won the bronze medal in the Team trap event. He also competed in the running deer, single shots event and finished 23rd. In the running deer, double shots event he finished 17th and in the trap competition he finished 4th.
