= Nestori Toivonen =

Finnish sport shooter

Personal information
- Born: 25 March 1865 Kuorevesi, Finland
- Died: 6 April 1927 (aged 62) Sakkola, Finland

Sport
- Sport: Sport shooting
Medal record
Men's shooting
Representing Finland
Olympic Games
Silver medal – second place	1920 Antwerp	Team 100 m running deer, single shots
Bronze medal – third place	1912 Stockholm	100 metre running deer, single shots
Bronze medal – third place	1912 Stockholm	100 metre team running deer, single shots
Bronze medal – third place	1920 Antwerp	Team 100 m running deer, double shots

Nestori Kallenpoika Toivonen (25 March 1865 – 6 April 1927) was a Finnish sport shooter who competed in the 1912 Summer Olympics and in the 1920 Summer Olympics.

In 1912, he won two bronze medals as part of the Finnish team, which won the bronze medal in the 100 metre running deer, single shots event as well as in the 100 metre running deer, single shots individual event. He also participated in the 300 metre free rifle, three positions event, but he did not finish.

In 1920, he again won two medals, a silver medal in the 100 m running deer, single shots team and a bronze medal in the 100 m running deer, double shots team. In addition, he finished seventh in the 300 m army rifle, prone, and eleventh as part of the 50 m army pistol team.

He was born in Kuorevesi and died in Sakkola.
