= Frangiskos Mavrommatis =

Greek sport shooter (1870–??)

Personal information
- Born: 13 January 1870 Chios, Ottoman Empire

Sport
- Sport: Sports shooting

Frangiskos Mavrommatis (Greek: Φραγκίσκος Μαυρομμάτης, born 13 January 1870, date of death unknown) was a Greek sport shooter who competed at the 1906 Intercalated Games, the 1908 Summer Olympics and the 1912 Summer Olympics.

He was born in Chios.

== Career ==
=== 1906 Athens ===
In the 1906 Summer Olympics, he participated in the following events:

- Free rifle teams - fourth place
- 20 m duelling pistol - sixth place
- 200 m army rifle - ninth place
- 50 m pistol - twelfth place
- 25 m army pistol (1873 model) - 14th place
- 25 m rapid fire pistol - 14th place
- 300 m army rifle - 17th place
- 25 m army pistol (standard model) - 23rd place
- Free rifle, free position - 27th place

=== 1908 London ===
In the 1908 Summer Olympics, he participated in the following events:

- Team military rifle - seventh place
- Team pistol - seventh place
- Team free rifle - ninth place
- Individual pistol - 25th place

=== 1912 Stockholm ===
Four years later at the 1912 Summer Olympics he participated in the following events:

- Team 25 metre small-bore rifle - fourth place
- Team 50 metre small-bore rifle - fifth place
- Team 50 metre military pistol - fifth place
- Team 30 metre military pistol - fifth place
- Team military rifle - seventh place
- 300 metre military rifle, three positions - 17th place
- 25 metre small-bore rifle - 18th place
- 600 metre free rifle - 22nd place
- 50 metre pistol - 26th place
- 30 metre rapid fire pistol - 29th place
- 50 metre rifle, prone - 34th place
