= Édoard Creuzé =

French sport shooter

Personal information
- Born: 12 February 1883 Paris, France
- Died: 7 March 1967 (aged 84) Mayenne, Mayenne, France

Sport
- Sport: Sport shooting

Édouard Creuzé de Lesser (12 February 1883 – 7 March 1967) was a French sport shooter who competed in the 1912 Summer Olympics.

He was born in Paris and died in Mayenne, Mayenne. In 1912, he was a member of the French team which finished sixth in the team clay pigeons event. In the individual trap competition he finished 41st.
