= Erich Graf von Bernstorff =

German sport shooter

Erich von Bernstorff-Gyldensteen
Personal information
- Born: 26 June 1883 Wittendörp, German Empire
- Died: 6 October 1968 (aged 85) Enggaard, Denmark

Sport
- Sport: Sport shooting
Medal record
Men's shooting
Representing Germany
Olympic Games
Bronze medal – third place	1912 Stockholm	team trap

Erich Graf von Bernstorff-Gyldensteen (26 June 1883 – 6 October 1968) was a German count and sport shooter who competed in the 1912 Summer Olympics.

He won the bronze medal in the team trap event. He also competed in the trap competition; he finished 17th.
