= Anders Lindskog =

Swedish sport shooter

Personal information
- Born: 16 January 1875 Nysund, Örebro Municipality, Sweden
- Died: 16 June 1917 (aged 42) Falun, Sweden

Sport
- Sport: Sport shooting

Anders Samuel Lindskog (16 January 1875 – 16 June 1917) was a Swedish sport shooter who competed in the 1912 Summer Olympics.

He was born in Nysund, Örebro Municipality.

In 1912 he finished sixth in the 100 metre running deer, single shots event as well as sixth in the 100 metre running deer, double shots competition.
