= Ruben Örtegren =

Swedish sport shooter

Personal information
- Born: 19 October 1881 Stockholm, Sweden
- Died: 27 February 1965 (aged 83) Stockholm, Sweden

Sport
- Sport: Sports shooting
Medal record
Men's shooting
Representing Sweden
Olympic Games
Silver medal – second place	1912 Stockholm	Team 50 m small-bore rifle

Ruben Örtegren (19 October 1881 – 27 February 1965) was a Swedish sport shooter who competed in the 1912 Summer Olympics.

In 1912, he won the silver medal as a member of the Swedish team in the team 50 metre small-bore rifle competition. In the 50 metre rifle, prone event he finished 19th, and in the 600 metre free rifle competition he finished 49th.
