= Leonardus Syttin =

Lithuanian sport shooter

Personal information
- Born: 3 December 1891 Vilnius, Russian Empire
- Died: 1973 (aged 81–82)

Sport
- Sport: Sports shooting

Leonardus "Leonid" Syttin (3 December 1891 – 1973) was a Lithuanian sport shooter who competed for the Russian Empire in the 1912 Summer Olympics. In 1912 he finished 23rd in the trap competition. He was born in Vilnius.
