= Adolph Cederström =

Swedish sport shooter

Personal information
- Born: 25 October 1886 Visby, Sweden
- Died: 7 September 1982 (aged 95) Uppsala, Sweden

Sport
- Sport: Sport shooting

Adolph Fredrik Ture Oskarsson Cederström (25 October 1886 – 7 September 1982) was a Swedish sport shooter who competed in the 1912 Summer Olympics.

He was born in Visby, Gotland, and died in Uppsala.

In 1912 he finished eighth in the 100 metre running deer, single shots event.
