= Ernst Rosenqvist =

Finnish sport shooter

Personal information
- Born: 24 August 1869 Helsinki, Finland
- Died: 27 May 1932 (aged 62) Kuopio, Finland

Sport
- Sport: Sport shooting
Medal record
Men's shooting
Representing Finland
Olympic Games
Bronze medal – third place	1912 Stockholm	Running dear, team

Ernst Edvard Rosenqvist (24 August 1869 – 27 May 1932) was a Finnish sport shooter who competed in the 1912 Summer Olympics.

He was part of the Finnish team, which won the bronze medal in the 100 metre running deer, single shots event. He also competed in the 100 metre running deer, single shots event and finished 14th.
