= Franz von Zedlitz und Leipe =

German sport shooter

Personal information
- Born: 21 April 1876 Berlin, German Empire
- Died: 29 March 1944 (aged 67) Brochocin, Province of Lower Silesia, Nazi Germany (now Poland)

Sport
- Sport: Sport shooting
Medal record
Men's shooting
Representing Germany
Olympic Games
Bronze medal – third place	1912 Stockholm	team trap

Franz Freiherr von Zedlitz und Leipe (21 April 1876 – 29 March 1944) was a German Freiherr and sport shooter who competed in the 1912 Summer Olympics.

He won the bronze medal in the team trap event. He also competed in the Shooting at the 1912 Summer Olympics – Men's trap competition and finished 4th.
