= Osted =

- town
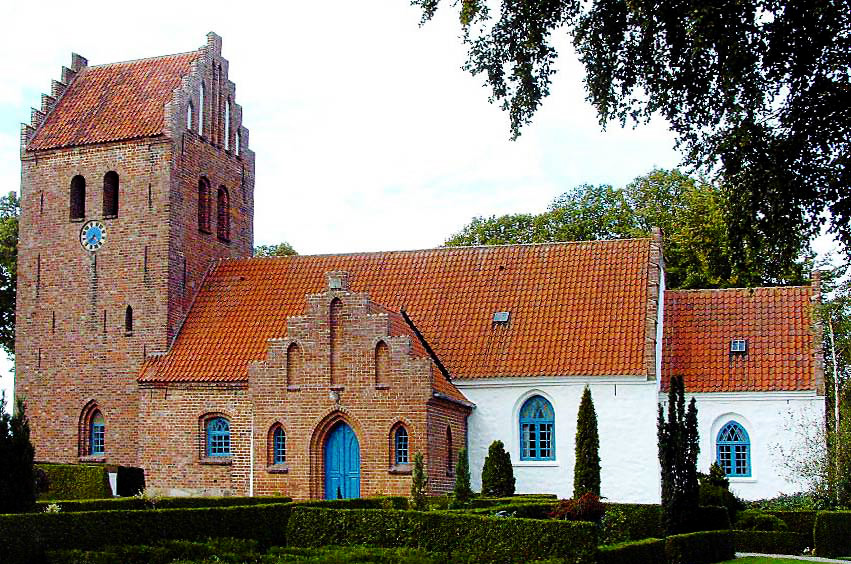
- Osted Church

- Location in Denmark Osted (Denmark Region Zealand)
- Coordinates: 55°34′N 11°58′E
- Country: Denmark
- Region: Zealand (Sjælland)
- Municipality: Lejre

Area
  - Urban: 1.6 km^{2} (0.62 sq mi)

Population (2026)
  - Urban: 2,349
  - Urban density: 1,500/km^{2} (3,800/sq mi)
- Time zone: UTC+1 (CET)
  - Summer (DST): UTC+2 (CEST)
- Postal code: DK-4320 Lejre

Osted is a town with a population of 2,349 (1 January 2026) in Lejre Municipality, Region Zealand, Denmark. The town is located at the road between the cities of Roskilde and Ringsted.

== Notable people ==
- Hans Denver (born 1876 in Osted – 1961) a Danish sports shooter who competed in the 1912 Summer Olympics
- Niels-Henning Ørsted Pedersen (born 1946 in Osted - 2005) a Danish jazz double bassist
- Peter Aalbæk Jensen (born 1956 in Osted) a Danish film producer
