= Alfred Goeldel-Bronikoven =

German sport shooter

Alfred Goeldel-Bronikowen
Personal information
- Born: 12 March 1882 Lengainen, Prussia, German Empire

Sport
- Sport: Sport shooting
Medal record
Men's shooting
Representing Germany
Olympic Games
Silver medal – second place	1912 Stockholm	trap
Bronze medal – third place	1912 Stockholm	team trap

Alfred Göldel-Bronikoven (born 12 March 1882, date of death unknown) was a German sport shooter who competed in the 1912 Summer Olympics. He competed in only two events and won medals in both.

He was born in Lengainen, Prussia (now Poland), to Max and Hertha Göldel, and baptised in Wartenburg in Ostpreußen. He was the elder brother of Horst Göldel-Bronikoven.
