= Pierre Gentil =

French sport shooter

Personal information
- Born: 12 October 1881 Paris, France
- Died: 4 April 1958 (aged 76) Rouen, France

Sport
- Sport: Sport shooting

Pierre Gentil (12 October 1881 – 4 April 1958) was a French sport shooter who competed in the 1912 Summer Olympics. He was born in Paris.

In 1912, at the Stockholm Games, he participated in the following events:

- team 50 metre small-bore rifle – fourth place
- team free rifle – fourth place
- team rifle – fifth place
- 25 metre small-bore rifle – 27th place
- 300 metre military rifle, three positions – 61st place
- 600 metre free rifle – 69th place
- 300 metre free rifle, three positions – did not finish
