= Shooting at the 1912 Summer Olympics – Men's 50 metre team small-bore rifle =

Olympic shooting event

Men's 50 metre team small-bore rifle at the Games of the V Olympiad
- Venue: Kaknäs
- Date: 3 July 1912
- Competitors: 24 from 6 nations

Medalists
1st place, gold medalist(s)		Great Britain; Edward Lessimore, Robert Murray, Joseph Pepé, William Pimm
2nd place, silver medalist(s)		Sweden; Eric Carlberg, Vilhelm Carlberg, Arthur Nordenswan, Ruben Örtegren
3rd place, bronze medalist(s)		United States; Frederick Hird, William Leushner, Carl Osburn, Warren Sprout

The men's 50 metre team small-bore rifle (originally called team competition, miniature-rifle) was a shooting sports event held as part of the Shooting at the 1912 Summer Olympics programme. It was the second appearance of the event, with a mixed-distance team small-bore rifle event having been held in 1908. A standing 50 metre team small-bore event would be held in 1920. The competition was held on Wednesday, 3 July 1912.

Twenty-four sport shooters from six nations competed.

== Results ==
Place	Team	Ind. score	Team score
1	Great Britain		762
1	William Pimm	195	762
1	Edward Lessimore	193	762
1	Joseph Pepé	189	762
1	Robert Murray	185	762
2	Sweden		748
2	Arthur Nordenswan	190	748
2	Eric Carlberg	189	748
2	Ruben Örtegren	185	748
2	Vilhelm Carlberg	184	748
3	United States		744
3	Warren Sprout	193	744
3	William Leushner	188	744
3	Frederick Hird	185	744
3	Carl Osburn	178	744
4	France		714
4	Léon Johnson	189	714
4	Pierre Gentil	183	714
4	André Regaud	180	714
4	Maxime Landin	162	714
5	Denmark		708
5	Povl Gerlow	185	708
5	Lars Jørgen Madsen	180	708
5	Frants Nielsen	177	708
5	Hans Denver	166	708
5	Greece		708
5	Ioannis Theofilakis	184	708
5	Iakovos Theofilas	177	708
5	Frangiskos Mavrommatis	174	708
5	Nikolaos Levidis	173	708
