= James Graham (sport shooter) =

American sport shooter

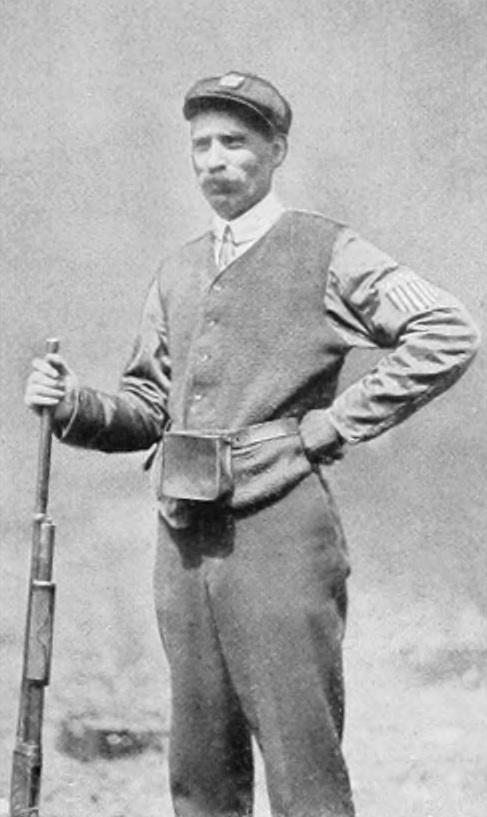
- James Graham at the 1912 Olympics

Personal information
- Born: February 12, 1870 Long Lake, Illinois, United States
- Died: February 18, 1950 (aged 80) Long Lake, Illinois, United States

Sport
- Sport: Shooting
Medal record
Representing the United States
Olympic Games
Gold medal – first place	1912 Stockholm	Trap, individual
Gold medal – first place	1912 Stockholm	Trap, team

James Robert "Jay" Graham (February 12, 1870 – February 18, 1950) was an American sport shooter who competed in the 1912 Summer Olympics in Stockholm, Sweden. He won gold medals in trap shooting and team clay pigeons. He turned professional soon after the 1912 Games.
