= Henry Burt =

British sport shooter (1875–1960)

Personal information
- Full name: Henry John Burt
- Born: 6 May 1875 Buckland, Devon, England
- Died: 20 September 1960 (aged 85)

Sport
- Sport: Sport shooting
Medal record
Men's shooting
Representing United Kingdom
Olympic Games
Bronze medal – third place	1912 Stockholm	50 metre rifle, prone

Henry John Burt (6 May 1875 – 20 September 1960) was a British sport shooter who competed in the 1912 Summer Olympics.

He won the bronze medal in the 50 metre rifle, prone event. He also competed in the 25 metre small-bore rifle event and finished ninth.
