= Adolf Schnitt =

Finnish sport shooter

Personal information
- Born: 17 April 1858 Turku, Finland
- Died: 4 December 1924 (aged 66) Helsinki, Finland

Sport
- Sport: Sport shooting

Gustaf Adolf Schnitt (17 April 1858 – 4 December 1924) was a Finnish sport shooter who competed in the 1912 Summer Olympics.

He was born in Turku and died in Helsinki. In 1912, he was part of the Finnish team which finished fifth in the team clay pigeons event. He finished fourth in the individual trap competition.
