= Frank Hall (sport shooter) =

American sport shooter (1865–1939)

Personal information
- Born: July 8, 1865 Woodside, New Jersey, United States
- Died: July 31, 1939 (aged 74) Manhattan, New York, United States

Sport
- Sport: Sports shooting
Medal record
Men's shooting
Representing United States
Olympic Games
Gold medal – first place	1912 Stockholm	Team trap

Frank Hall (July 8, 1865 – July 31, 1939) was an American sport shooter who competed in the 1912 Summer Olympics. He was a member of the New York Athletic Club.

In 1912, he won the gold medal as a member of the American team in the team clay pigeons competition. He finished twelfth in the individual trap event.

He was born in Jersey City, New Jersey and died in New York City.
