= William Milne (sport shooter) =

British sport shooter

Personal information
- Born: 23 March 1852 Aberdeen, Scotland
- Died: 16 March 1923 (aged 70)

Sport
- Sport: Sports shooting
Medal record
Men's shooting
Representing United Kingdom
Olympic Games
Silver medal – second place	1912 Stockholm	50m rifle, prone
Silver medal – second place	1912 Stockholm	Team 25m

William Milne (23 March 1852 – 16 March 1923) was a British sport shooter who competed at the 1908 Summer Olympics and the 1912 Summer Olympics.

In the 1908 Summer Olympics, he participated in the following events:

- disappearing target small-bore rifle - fourth place
- moving target small-bore rifle - seventh place
- stationary target small-bore rifle - 14th place

Four years later, in 1912, he won the silver medal in the 50 metre rifle prone competition, as well as with the British team in the 25 metre small-bore rifle competition. In the individual 25 metre small-bore rifle event he finished 22nd.

Milne served in the British Army, serving with the 92nd Gordon Highlanders in India, Afghanistan, and South Africa. In 1902, he was selected to fill a vacancy in the King's Bodyguard of the Yeomen of the Guard. Apart from this appointment, he had retired from the Army and became Steward of the London Scottish Golf Club.

His family comprised sons James, Douglas, and Gordon, and daughters Annie and Doris. He was survived by his wife, Mary.
