= Edward Lessimore =

British sport shooter

Personal information
- Born: 20 January 1881 Barton Regis, Gloucestershire, England
- Died: 7 March 1960 (aged 79) Bristol, England

Sport
- Sport: Sports shooting
Medal record
Men's shooting
Representing United Kingdom
Olympic Games
Gold medal – first place	1912 Stockholm	Team 50 m small-bore rifle

Edward John Lessimore (20 January 1881 – 7 March 1960) born in Barton Regis, Gloucestershire was a British sport shooter who competed in the 1912 Summer Olympics.

In 1912 he won the gold medal with the British team in the team 50 metre small-bore rifle competition. In the 50 metre rifle, prone event he finished fourth and in the 25 metre small-bore rifle competition he finished 12th.
