= John Stafford (sport shooter) =

English sport shooter

John Stafford is an English sport shooter from Preston, Lancashire. He is known for his achievements in shooting competitions in the North West England and also for his shooting likeness to John Bellamy.

== Target Shooting ==
Stafford has been competing in various Down-The-Line shooting competitions worldwide since the late 80s. In 2001, he came 3rd at the Kreighoff Classic shoot in North Wales, making it into the hall of fame for top 10 competitors of Great Britain, for that year.

Stafford's main shooting ground is at the A6 Target Club just outside Bolton, he has had a consistent score from 2005 to 2009, he has never dropped more than 4 targets for each shoot, and he has been shooting at AA for 2 years then moved up to AAA in 2008.
