= Henri de Castex =

French sport shooter

Personal information
- Born: 12 July 1854 Molsheim, France
- Died: 17 November 1934 (aged 80)

Sport
- Sport: Sport shooting

Baron Marie Jules Henri de Castex (12 July 1854 – 17 November 1934) was a French sport shooter who competed in the 1912 Summer Olympics and in the 1920 Summer Olympics. He was born in Molsheim.

In 1912, he was a member of the French team which finished sixth in the team clay pigeons event. In the individual trap competition, he finished 29th, and in the 30 metre rapid fire pistol he finished 42nd. Eight years later, he was part of the French team which finished seventh in the team clay pigeons event.
