= Dmitri Barkov (sport shooter) =

Russian sport shooter

Personal information
- Born: 28 October 1880 Helsinki, Grand Duchy of Finland, Russian Empire

Sport
- Sport: Sport shooting

Dmitri Barkov (Russian: Дмитрий Барков; born 28 October 1880, date of death unknown) was a Russian sport shooter who competed in the 1912 Summer Olympics.

He was born in Helsinki, Grand Duchy of Finland.

In 1912 he was a member of the Russian team which finished fifth in the team 100 metre running deer, single shots competition. In the 100 metre running deer, single shots event he finished 31st and in the 100 metre running deer, double shots competition he finished 19th.
