= Edvard Bacher =

Finnish sport shooter

Personal information
- Born: 16 October 1875 Helsinki, Finland
- Died: 22 March 1961 (aged 85) Helsinki, Finland

Sport
- Sport: Sport shooting

Carl Edvard Bacher (16 October 1875 – 22 March 1961) was a Finnish sport shooter who competed in the 1912 Summer Olympics.

He was born and died in Helsinki. In 1912, he was part of the Finnish team which finished fifth in the team clay pigeons event. In the individual trap competition he finished 45th.
