= Ralph Spotts =

American sport shooter

Personal information
- Born: June 14, 1875 Canton, Ohio, United States
- Died: April 17, 1924 (aged 48) New York, New York, United States

Sport
- Sport: Sports shooting
Medal record
Men's shooting
Representing the United States
Olympic Games
| Gold medal – first place | 1912 Stockholm | Men's trap team |

Ralph Lewis Spotts (June 14, 1875 – April 17, 1924) was an American sport shooter who competed in the 1912 Summer Olympics.

== Life and career ==
He was born in Canton, Ohio on June 14, 1875. In 1912, he won the gold medal as a member of the American team in the team clay pigeons competition. He finished ninth in the individual trap event. He died on April 17, 1924, in New York City.
