= Charles W. Billings =

American sport shooter

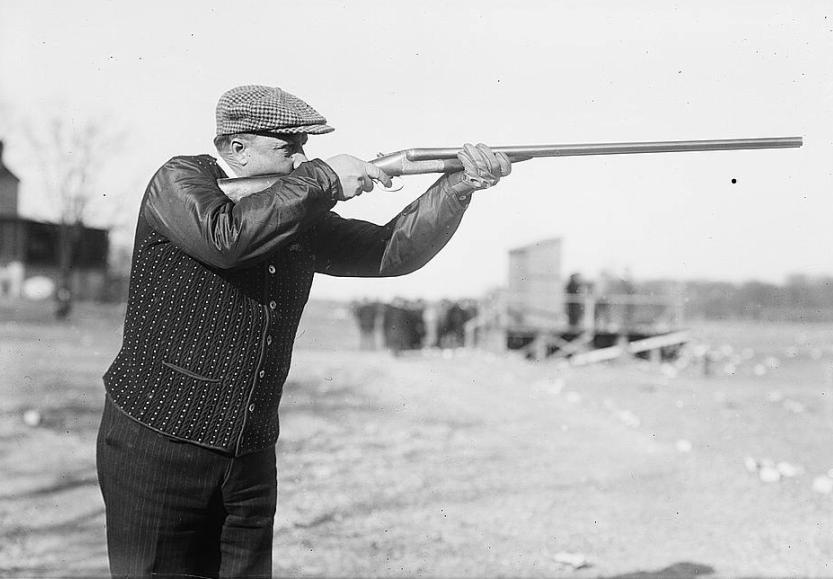
- Billings in 1912 on Travers Island, New York

Personal information
- Born: November 26, 1866 Eatontown, New Jersey, United States
- Died: December 13, 1928 (aged 62) Deal, New Jersey, United States
Medal record
Men's shooting
Representing the United States
Olympic Games
Gold medal – first place	1912 Stockholm	Team clay pigeons

Charles W. Billings (November 26, 1866 – December 13, 1928) was a politician and competitive shooter from New Jersey who was a member of the 1912 Summer Olympics American trapshooting team that won the gold medal in team clay pigeons. He was a member of the New York Athletic Club. He competed in the Travers Island, New York clay pigeon shooting competition in both 1911 and 1913.

== Biography ==
He was born on November 26, 1866, in Eatontown, New Jersey.

In 1912, he won the gold medal as a member of the American team in the team clay pigeons competition. In the individual trap competition he finished 42nd.

Billings, who had served from 1920 until his death as the first mayor of Oceanport, New Jersey, died of a heart attack on December 13, 1928, in Deal, New Jersey.
