= John Bellamy (sport shooter) =

British sport shooter

John Bellamy is a British sport shooter residing near Preston, Lancashire, noted for his consistent achievements in shooting competitions and for his similar shooting style to that of John Stafford.

== Target Shooting ==
Bellamy competed in many national Down-The-Line shooting competitions within the UK. In 2000 he won the Kreighoff Classic shoot in Mid Wales, making it into the hall of fame, this made him one of only 12 people to win the championship ever (the 2nd at the time, after Mike Milne).

At the DTL Home Internationals, in Mid Wales, 2009, he placed a 99/294.
