= René Texier =

French sport shooter

Personal information
- Born: 28 October 1882 Chantilly, France
- Died: 10 October 1967 (aged 84) Paris, France

Sport
- Sport: Sport shooting

René Texier (28 October 1882 – 10 October 1967) was a French sport shooter who competed in the 1912 Summer Olympics, in the 1920 Summer Olympics, and in the 1924 Summer Olympics. He was born in Chantilly. In 1912, he was a member of the French team which finished sixth in the team clay pigeons event. In the individual trap competition he finished 48th. Eight years later, he was part of the French team which finished seventh in the team clay pigeons event. At the 1924 Games, he finished eleventh with the French team in the team clay pigeons competition.
