= Carl Wollert =

Swedish sport shooter

Personal information
- Born: 11 March 1877 Kroksmåla, Kalmar Municipality, Sweden
- Died: 4 April 1953 (aged 76) Tierp, Sweden

Sport
- Sport: Sport shooting

Carl Adolf Wollert (11 March 1877 – 4 April 1953) was a Swedish sport shooter who competed in the 1912 Summer Olympics.

He was born in Kroksmåla, Kalmar Municipality and died in Tierp. In 1912, he was part of the Swedish team which finished fourth in the team clay pigeons event. In the individual trap competition he finished 56th.
