= William McDonnell =

American sport shooter

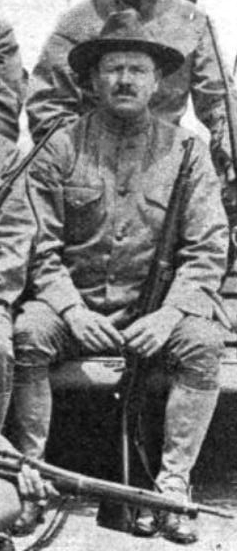
- At the 1912 Summer Olympics

Personal information
- Born: July 15, 1876 Detroit, Michigan, United States
- Died: May 11, 1941 (aged 64)

Sport
- Sport: Sports shooting
Medal record
Men's shooting
Representing United States
Olympic Games
Silver medal – second place	1912 Stockholm	team running deer, single shots
Bronze medal – third place	1912 Stockholm	team 25 m small-bore rifle

William Neil McDonnell (July 15, 1876 – May 11, 1941) was an American sport shooter who competed in the 1912 Summer Olympics.

In 1912, he won the silver medal as a member of the American team in the team running deer, single shots event, and the bronze medal in the team 25 metre small-bore rifle competition. In the 1912 Summer Olympics he also participated in the following events:

- 25 metre small-bore rifle - 14th place
- 50 metre rifle, prone - 18th place
- 300 metre military rifle, three positions - 31st place
- 600 metre free rifle - 32nd place
