= Emil Collan =

Finnish sport shooter

Personal information
- Born: 21 May 1882 Savonlinna, Finland
- Died: 22 December 1948 (aged 66) Pohja, Finland

Sport
- Sport: Sport shooting

Emil Johannes Collan (21 May 1882 – 22 December 1948) was a Finnish sport shooter who competed in the 1912 Summer Olympics.

He was born in Savonlinna and died in Pohja. In 1912, he was part of the Finnish team which finished fifth in the team clay pigeons event. In the individual trap competition he finished 29th.
