= Hjalmar Frisell =

Swedish military officer and sport shooter

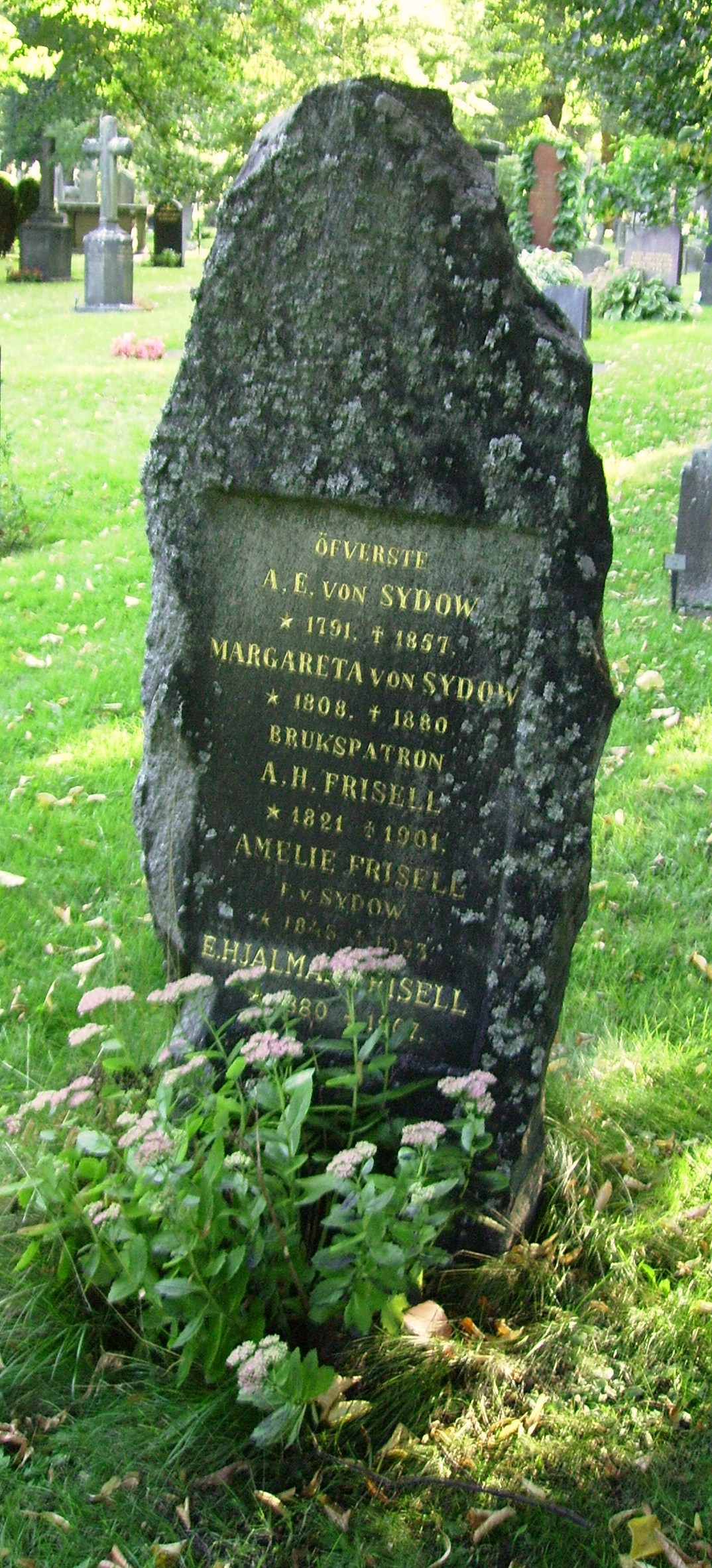
Hjalmar Frisell's grave at Norra begravningsplatsen in Solna.

Erik Hjalmar Frisell (27 August 1880 – 27 May 1967) was a Swedish military officer and sport shooter who competed in the 1912 Summer Olympics. During the 1918 Finnish Civil War he was the commander of the voluntary Swedish Brigade.

== Life ==
Frisell was born in Stavnäs, Värmland County. His father owned the Stömne bruk ironworks. Frisell served as an artillery officer in Uppsala but retired in 1910. In 1918, he was recruited as the commander of the Swedish Brigade, a voluntary brigade fighting with the Whites in the Finnish Civil War. Frisell took part in the Battle of Tampere in March–April 1918. After the Finnish Civil War, Frisell lived 10 years in Kenya, where he assisted the British Army in railway construction. Frisell published two biographies of his years in Africa. Hjalmar Frisell died in Stockholm in 1967.

== Sports career ==
In 1912, Frisell was part of the Swedish team, which finished fourth in the team clay pigeons event. In the individual trap competition he finished 29th and in the 100 metre running deer, double shots event he finished twelfth.

== Works ==
- Die Sjöquist'sche Richtmethode und ihre Anwendung bei Mitraillensen (1907)
- Sju år i tält bland vita och svarta: sällskapsliv, arbete och äventyr i Kenya (1937)
- Leva farligt i Afrika (1939)
