= William Grosvenor =

British sport shooter (1869–1948)

Personal information
- Born: 18 July 1869 Hackney, London, England
- Died: 5 June 1948 (aged 78) Hickling, Norfolk, England

Sport
- Sport: Sports shooting
Medal record
Men's shooting
Representing United Kingdom
Olympic Games
Silver medal – second place	1912 Stockholm	Team trap

William Percy Grosvenor (18 July 1869 – 5 June 1948) was a British sport shooter who competed in the 1912 Summer Olympics and 1920 Summer Olympics.

Grosvenor was born 18 July 1869 in Hackney, London the son of William and Emily Harriett Grosvenor.

In 1912, he won the silver medal with the British team in the team clay pigeons competition. In the individual trap event he finished 16th. At the end of 1912, he married Ida Vincent in Stroud Green, Haringey, London. Eight years later, he finished fourth as a member of the British team in the team clay pigeons competition.
