= Nikolaos Levidis =

Greek sport shooter

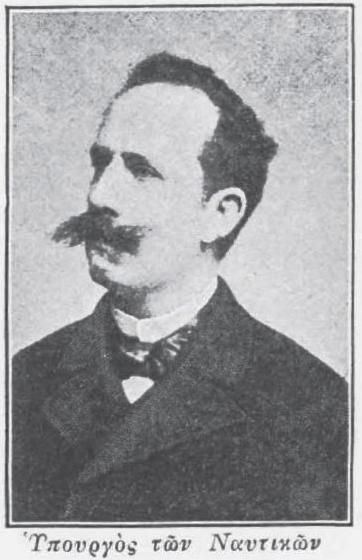
- Levidis circa 1896

Personal information
- Born: 25 August 1868 Corfu, Greece

Sport
- Sport: Sports shooting

Nikolaos M. Levidis (Greek: Νικόλαος M. Λεβίδης), born 25 August 1868, date of death unknown) was a Greek shooter in the 1896 Summer Olympics and in the 1912 Summer Olympics. He was born in Corfu.

Levidis competed at the 1896 Summer Olympics in Athens in the free rifle event. His place and score in the event are not known, though he did not finish in the top five. Sixteen years later at the 1912 Summer Olympics he participated in the following events:

- 300 metre military rifle, three positions – fourth place
- Team 25 metre small-bore rifle – fourth place
- Team 50 metre small-bore rifle – fifth place
- Team military rifle – seventh place
- 100 metre running deer, single shots – 15th place
- 25 metre small-bore rifle – 30th place
- 30 metre dueling pistol – 34th place
- 600 metre free rifle – 52nd place
