= Robert Murray (sport shooter) =

British sport shooter

Personal information
- Born: 18 February 1870 Edinburgh, Scotland
- Died: 28 April 1948 (aged 78) Sale, Cheshire, England

Sport
- Sport: Sports shooting
Medal record
Men's shooting
Representing United Kingdom
Olympic Games
Gold medal – first place	1912 Stockholm	Team 50 m small-bore rifle

Robert Cook Murray (18 February 1870 – 28 April 1948) was a Scottish sport shooter who competed in the 1912 Summer Olympics.

In 1912, he won the gold medal with the British team in the 50 metre small-bore rifle competition. In the 25 metre small-bore rifle event he finished fifth, and in the 50 metre rifle, prone competition he finished sixth.
