= Edward Gleason =

American sport shooter

Personal information
- Full name: Edward Francis Gleason
- Born: November 9, 1869 Hyannis, Massachusetts, U.S.
- Died: April 9, 1944 (aged 74) Hyannis, Massachusetts, U.S.

Sport
- Sport: Sports shooting
Medal record
Men's shooting
Representing United States
Olympic Games
Gold medal – first place	1912 Stockholm	team trap

Edward Francis Gleason (November 9, 1869 – April 9, 1944) was an American sport shooter who competed in the 1912 Summer Olympics.

== Biography ==
He was born on November 9, 1869, in Hyannis, Massachusetts. In 1912 he won the gold medal as member of the American team in the team clay pigeons competition. In the individual trap event he finished ninth. He died on April 9, 1944.
