= Warren Sprout =

American sport shooter

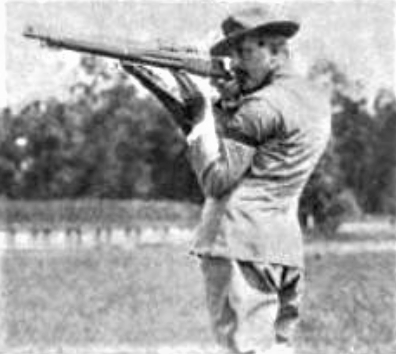

Personal information
- Born: February 3, 1874 Picture Rocks, Pennsylvania, United States
- Died: August 23, 1945 (aged 71) Westfield, New Jersey, United States

Sport
- Sport: Sports shooting
Medal record
Men's shooting
Representing the United States
Olympic Games
Gold medal – first place	1912 Stockholm	Team rifle
Bronze medal – third place	1912 Stockholm	25 m team small-bore rifle
Bronze medal – third place	1912 Stockholm	50 m team small-bore rifle

Warren Austin Sprout (February 3, 1874 – August 23, 1945) was an American sport shooter who competed in the 1912 Summer Olympics.

In 1912, he won the gold medal as a member of the American team in the team military rifle competition and two bronze medals in the team 25 metre small-bore rifle event and in the team 50 metre small-bore rifle competition. In the 1912 Summer Olympics he also participated in the following events:

- 50 metre rifle, prone - twelfth place
- 600 metre free rifle - 14th place
- 25 metre small-bore rifle - 17th place
- 300 metre free rifle, three positions - 32nd place
- 300 metre military rifle, three positions - 37th place

He was born in Picture Rocks, Pennsylvania and died in Westfield, New Jersey.
