= Joseph Pepé =

English sport shooter (1881–1970)

Personal information
- Born: 5 March 1881
- Died: 29 September 1970 (aged 89)

Sport
- Sport: Sports shooting
Medal record
Men's shooting
Representing United Kingdom
Olympic Games
Gold medal – first place	1912 Stockholm	Team 50 m small-bore rifle
Silver medal – second place	1912 Stockholm	Team 25 m small-bore rifle

Joseph Pepé (5 March 1881 – 29 September 1970) was an English sport shooter who competed in the 1912 Summer Olympics for Great Britain. In 1912 he won the gold medal with the British team in the team 50 metre small-bore rifle competition and the silver medal in the team 25 metre small-bore rifle event. In the 25 metre small-bore rifle competition he finished fourth and in the 50 metre rifle, prone event he finished 14th.
