= David Griffiths (sport shooter) =

Welsh sports shooter

Personal information
- Full name: David James Griffiths
- Born: 31 March 1874 Maesteg, Bridgend, Wales
- Died: 5 September 1931 (aged 57)

Sport
- Sport: Sports shooting

David James Griffiths (31 March 1874 – 5 September 1931) was a Welsh sports shooter. He competed for Great Britain in two events at the 1912 Summer Olympics.
