= Francis Kemp =

Sports shooter

Personal information
- Born: 1 July 1891 London, England
- Died: 15 February 1967 (aged 75)

Sport
- Sport: Sports shooting

Francis Kemp (1 July 1891 – 15 February 1967) was a British sports shooter. He competed in two events at the 1912 Summer Olympics.
