= Per-Olof Arvidsson =

Swedish sport shooter

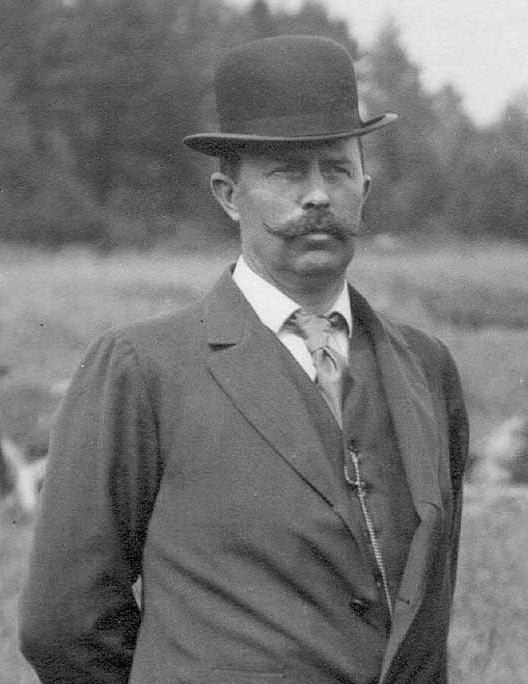
- Arvidsson at the 1912 Olympics

Personal information
- Nationality: Swedish
- Born: 18 December 1864 Blekinge, Sweden
- Died: 30 August 1947 (aged 82) Stockholm, Sweden

Sport
- Country: Sweden
- Sport: Sports shooting
- Club: Stockholms SkarpSF
Medal record
Representing Sweden
Olympic Games
Gold medal – first place	1912 Stockholm	100 m team running
Silver medal – second place	1908 London	Team free rifle

Per-Olof Arvidsson (18 December 1864 – 30 August 1947) was a Swedish shooter who competed at the 1908 and 1912 Summer Olympics in eight events in total. He won a silver medal in the team free rifle 1908 and a gold in 1912, in the 100 m team running deer, single shots.
