= Axel Wahlstedt =

Swedish sports shooter

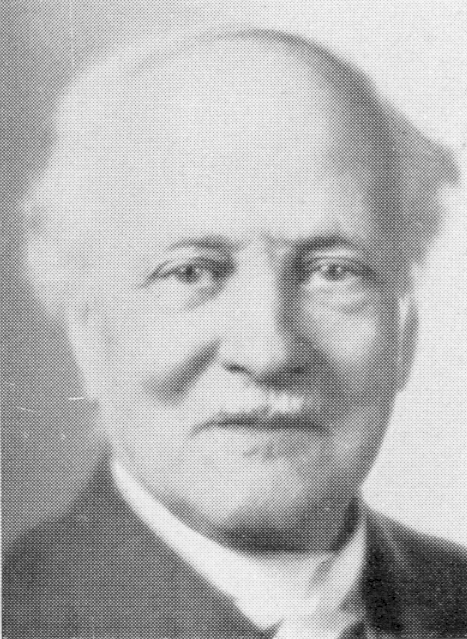

Personal information
- Born: 11 January 1867 Kristianstad, Sweden
- Died: 11 December 1943 (aged 76) Stockholm, Sweden

Sport
- Sport: Sports shooting

Axel Wahlstedt (11 January 1867 – 15 December 1943) was a Swedish sports shooter. He competed in two events at the 1912 Summer Olympics.
