= Frederick Hird =

American sport shooter

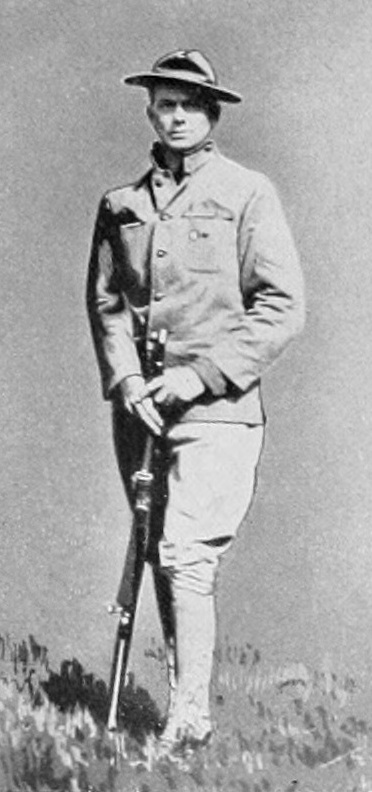
- Hird in 1912

Personal information
- Born: December 6, 1879 New Diggings, Wisconsin, United States
- Died: September 27, 1952 (aged 72) Des Moines, Iowa, United States
- Height: 1.82 m (6 ft 0 in)

Sport
- Sport: Shooting
- Club: US Army
Medal record
Representing the United States
Olympic Games
Gold medal – first place	1912 Stockholm	50 m rifle, prone
Bronze medal – third place	1912 Stockholm	Team 25 m small-bore rifle
Bronze medal – third place	1912 Stockholm	Team 50 m small-bore rifle

Frederick Sylvester Hird (December 6, 1879 – September 27, 1952) was an American sports shooter who won one gold and two bronze medals at the 1912 Summer Olympics in Stockholm, Sweden.

Hird started as a professional boxer and semiprofessional baseball player, but in 1900, he decided to pursue a military career and joined the Iowa National Guard. After competing at the 1912 Olympics, he fought in the Mexican border campaign of 1914 and in World War I. From 1928 to 1936, he served as U.S. Marshall for southern Iowa and then as a special agent for the Iowa attorney general’s office until retiring in 1943 as a lieutenant colonel.
