= John H. Hendrickson =

American sport shooter (1872–1925)

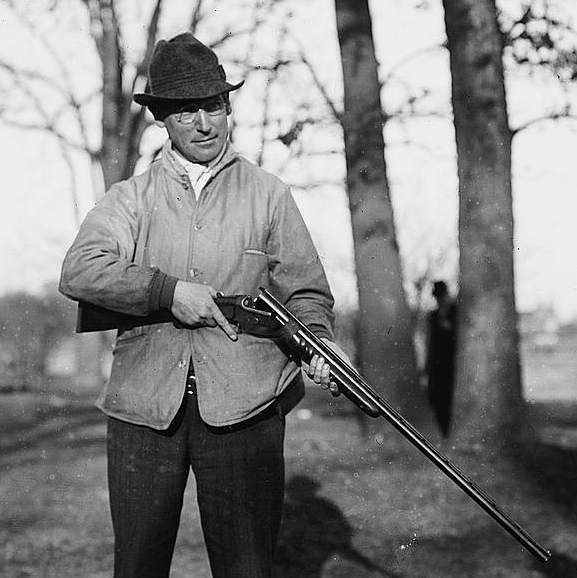
- Hendrickson in 1912 on Travers Island, New York

Personal information
- Born: October 20, 1872 Long Island, New York, U.S.
- Died: February 24, 1925 (aged 52) Queens, New York, U.S.
Medal record
Men's shooting
Representing the United States
Olympic Games
Gold medal – first place	1912 Stockholm	Trap team

John H. Hendrickson (October 20, 1872 – February 24, 1925) was an American sport shooter who competed in the 1912 Summer Olympics.

== Biography ==
Hendrickson was born in Long Island, New York.

In 1912, he won the gold medal as a member of the American team in the team clay pigeon shooting. In the individual trap event he finished 41st.

He died in Queens, New York.
