= William Styles =

English sport shooter (1874–1940)

Personal information
- Born: 11 October 1874 Islington, London, England
- Died: 8 April 1940 (aged 65) Seaford, East Sussex, England

Sport
- Sport: Sports shooting
Medal record
Men's shooting
Representing United Kingdom
Olympic Games
Gold medal – first place	1908 London	Disappearing target
Silver medal – second place	1912 Stockholm	Team 25m

William Kensett Styles (11 October 1874 – 8 April 1940) was an English sport shooter, who competed at the 1908 Summer Olympics and the 1912 Summer Olympics representing Great Britain.

In the 1908 Olympics, he won a gold medal in the disappearing target small-bore rifle and was 9th in the moving target small-bore rifle event. Four years later, he won a silver medal in the 25 metre team small-bore rifle event, was 13th in the 25 metre small-bore rifle event, and 27th in the 50 metre rifle from the prone position event.
