= William Pimm =

British sport shooter (1864–1952)

Personal information
- Born: 10 December 1864 Bow, London, England
- Died: 18 July 1952 (aged 87) Miami, Florida, United States

Sport
- Sport: Sports shooting
Medal record
Men's shooting
Representing United Kingdom
Olympic Games
Gold medal – first place	1908 London	Team small-bore rifle
Gold medal – first place	1912 Stockholm	50m team small-bore rifle
Silver medal – second place	1912 Stockholm	25m team small-bore rifle

William Edwin Pimm (10 December 1864 – 18 July 1952) was an English sport shooter, who competed in the 1908 Summer Olympics and 1912 Summer Olympics for Great Britain.

== Career ==
In the 1908 Olympics, he won a gold medal in the team small-bore rifle event, was sixth in the stationary target small-bore rifle event, sixth in the moving target small-bore rifle event, and 15th in the disappearing target small-bore rifle event. Four years later, he won a gold medal in the 50 metre team small-bore rifle event, won silver in the 25 metre team small-bore rifle event, was seventh in the 25 metre small-bore rifle event, and was 10th in the 50 metre rifle from the prone position event.
