= Aleksandr Dobrzhansky =

Russian sports shooter

Personal information
- Born: 19 April 1873 Tiflis, Russian Empire
- Died: 15 November 1937 (aged 64) Paris, Third French Republic

Sport
- Sport: Sports shooting

Aleksandr Dobrzhansky (19 April 1873 – 15 November 1937) was a Russian sports shooter. He competed in seven events at the 1912 Summer Olympics, representing the Russian Empire.
