= Åke Lundeberg =

Swedish sport shooter

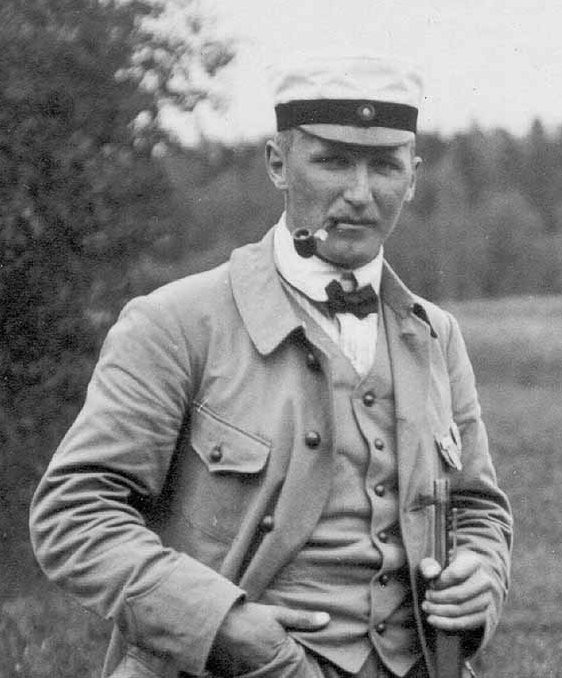
- Åke Lundeberg at the 1912 Olympics

Personal information
- Nationality: Swedish
- Born: 14 December 1888 Gävle, Sweden
- Died: 29 May 1939 (aged 50) Gävle, Sweden

Sport
- Country: Sweden
- Sport: Sport shooting
- Club: Örebro SF
Medal record
Representing Sweden
Olympic Games
Gold medal – first place	1912 Stockholm	Running deer, double shot
Gold medal – first place	1912 Stockholm	Running deer, single shot, team
Silver medal – second place	1912 Stockholm	Running deer, single shot

Åke Lundeberg (14 December 1888 – 29 May 1939) was a Swedish sport shooter who won two gold and one silver medal at the 1912 Summer Olympics.

Lundederg was a military officer and a forest manager who belonged to the State Forestry School in Kloten at the time of the 1912 Olympics. He retired early and returned to his hometown of Gävle, where he died aged 50.
