= William Leushner =

American sport shooter

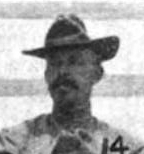

Personal information
- Born: November 27, 1863 Cookstown, Simcoe County, Canada West
- Died: October 25, 1935 (aged 71) Buffalo, United States

Sport
- Sport: Sports shooting
Medal record
Men's shooting
Representing United States
Olympic Games
Gold medal – first place	1908 London	Team military rifle
Silver medal – second place	1912 Stockholm	100 metre team
Bronze medal – third place	1912 Stockholm	50 metre team small-bore rifle
Bronze medal – third place	1912 Stockholm	25 metre team small-bore rifle

William D. F. Leushner (November 27, 1863 – October 25, 1935) was a competitive rifle shooter.

As a teenager, he moved to Buffalo, New York and joined the United States National Guard. In the 1908 Summer Olympics, he won a gold medal as a member of the U.S. military rifle team, having the highest individual score in the team competition. In the 1912 Summer Olympics, Leushner won a silver medal in the "team running deer, single shot 100 meters" competition (targets, not actual deer, were used) and two bronze medals, finishing third in the "small-bore rifle teams 25 meters", and "small-bore rifle teams 50 meters". Leushner finished his Olympic career at the 1920 Olympics in Antwerp, Belgium, in which for the first time he failed to medal. He was a three-time winner of the National Rifle Association of America's Members Trophy, winning the inaugural contest in 1901 and retaking the title in 1903 and 1908.

As a member of the U.S. National Guard, Leushner served on the Mexican border Pancho Villa Expedition with the 74th regiment. He was a marksmanship instructor at Camp Perry during the First World War and one year with the American Army of Occupation from 1919 to 1920. He was eventually made Lieutenant Colonel in the Reserve Corps.

Leushner died on October 25, 1935, aged 71, in his home in Buffalo. He had no children and was survived by his widow and several Canadian relatives.

== Awards and medals ==
- Olympic gold medal 1908 military rifle team competition
- Olympic silver medal 1912 team running deer, single shot
- Olympic bronze medal 1912 small-bore rifle teams 25 meters
- Olympic bronze medal 1912 small-bore rifle teams 50 meters
- N.R.A. Member's Trophy 1901
- N.R.A. Member's trophy 1903
- N.R.A. Member's Trophy 1908

== Sources ==
- "Big reception for Yankee marksmen", Buffalo News (byline 'the news bureau' Washington, D.C.), July 17, 1908
- "W.F. Leushner, ill 10 days, dies", obituary, Buffalo News (no author given), October 26, 1935
- Gene Korzelius, "Buffalo athletes won many world honors in sportdom", Buffalo News, October 11, 1930
- David Wallechinsky, The Complete Book of the Olympics
- "Noted soldier, Olympic star, taken by death" (obituary), Buffalo Courier (no byline), October 26, 1935
