= List of Olympic medalists in shooting =

This is the complete list of Olympic medalists in shooting.

== Current program ==
=== Men ===
==== Air pistol ====
Games	Gold	Silver	Bronze
1988 Seoul	Tanyu Kiryakov; Bulgaria	Erich Buljung; United States	Xu Haifeng; China
1992 Barcelona	Wang Yifu; China	Sergei Pyzhianov; Unified Team	Sorin Babii; Romania
1996 Atlanta	Roberto Di Donna; Italy	Wang Yifu; China	Tanyu Kiryakov; Bulgaria
2000 Sydney	Franck Dumoulin; France	Wang Yifu; China	Igor Basinski; Belarus
2004 Athens	Wang Yifu; China	Mikhail Nestruyev; Russia	Vladimir Isakov; Russia
2008 Beijing	Pang Wei; China	Jin Jong-oh; South Korea	Jason Turner; United States
2012 London	Jin Jong-oh; South Korea	Luca Tesconi; Italy	Andrija Zlatić; Serbia
2016 Rio de Janeiro	Hoàng Xuân Vinh; Vietnam	Felipe Wu; Brazil	Pang Wei; China
2020 Tokyo	Javad Foroughi; Iran	Damir Mikec; Serbia	Pang Wei; China
2024 Paris	Xie Yu; China	Federico Nilo Maldini; Italy	Paolo Monna; Italy
2028 Los Angeles			

==== Air rifle ====
Games	Gold	Silver	Bronze
1984 Los Angeles	Philippe Heberlé; France	Andreas Kronthaler; Austria	Barry Dagger; Great Britain
1988 Seoul	Goran Maksimović; Yugoslavia	Nicolas Berthelot; France	Johann Riederer; West Germany
1992 Barcelona	Yuri Fedkin; Unified Team	Franck Badiou; France	Johann Riederer; Germany
1996 Atlanta	Artem Khadjibekov; Russia	Wolfram Waibel; Austria	Jean-Pierre Amat; France
2000 Sydney	Cai Yalin; China	Artem Khadjibekov; Russia	Yevgeni Aleinikov; Russia
2004 Athens	Zhu Qinan; China	Li Jie; China	Jozef Gönci; Slovakia
2008 Beijing	Abhinav Bindra; India	Zhu Qinan; China	Henri Häkkinen; Finland
2012 London	Alin Moldoveanu; Romania	Niccolò Campriani; Italy	Gagan Narang; India
2016 Rio de Janeiro	Niccolò Campriani; Italy	Serhiy Kulish; Ukraine	Vladimir Maslennikov; Russia
2020 Tokyo	Will Shaner; United States	Sheng Lihao; China	Yang Haoran; China
2024 Paris	Sheng Lihao; China	Victor Lindgren; Sweden	Miran Maričić; Croatia
2028 Los Angeles			

==== Rapid fire pistol ====
Games	Gold	Silver	Bronze
1896 Athens (Note: Only muzzle-loading pistols of .45 caliber (30 shots in 5 series of 6 shots each). The 25 metre military pistol, which was won using a Colt revolver, was a separate event.)	Ioannis Frangoudis; Greece	Georgios Orfanidis; Greece	Holger Nielsen; Denmark
1900 Paris (Note: 20 metre military pistol event for professionals (6 shots in 1 series of 6 shots); prize money awarded)	Maurice Larrouy; France	Léon Moreaux; France	Eugène Balme; France
1904–1908	not included in the Olympic program		
1912 Stockholm (Note: The individual competition with revolver and pistol (duel shooting) at 30 metres distance (30 shots in 6 series of 5 shots each))	Alfred Lane; United States	Paul Palén; Sweden	Johan Hübner von Holst; Sweden
1920 Antwerp (Note: In 1920 there was a 30 metre military pistol event (30 shots in 5 series of 6 shots each) in which Brazilian shooters used Smith & Wesson revolvers with adjustable sights, while American shooters used either the Colt Army Special or the Smith & Wesson Military with fixed sights. The International Shooting Sport Federation regards this as the next progression of the 25 metre rapid fire pistol event in 1920.)	not included in the Olympic program		
1924 Paris	Henry Bailey; United States	Vilhelm Carlberg; Sweden	Lennart Hannelius; Finland
1928 Amsterdam	not included in the Olympic program		
1932 Los Angeles	Renzo Morigi; Italy	Heinz Hax; Germany	Domenico Matteucci; Italy
1936 Berlin	Cornelius van Oyen; Germany	Heinz Hax; Germany	Torsten Ullman; Sweden
1948 London	Károly Takács; Hungary	Carlos Diaz Sáenz; Argentina	Sven Lundquist; Sweden
1952 Helsinki	Károly Takács; Hungary	Szilárd Kun; Hungary	Gheorghe Lichiardopol; Romania
1956 Melbourne	Ștefan Petrescu; Romania	Yevgeni Cherkasov; Soviet Union	Gheorghe Lichiardopol; Romania
1960 Rome	William McMillan; United States	Pentti Linnosvuo; Finland	Aleksandr Zabelin; Soviet Union
1964 Tokyo	Pentti Linnosvuo; Finland	Ion Tripșa; Romania	Lubomír Nácovský; Czechoslovakia
1968 Mexico City	Józef Zapędzki; Poland	Marcel Roșca; Romania	Renart Suleimanov; Soviet Union
1972 Munich	Józef Zapędzki; Poland	Ladislav Falta; Czechoslovakia	Viktor Torshin; Soviet Union
1976 Montreal	Norbert Klaar; East Germany	Jürgen Wiefel; East Germany	Roberto Ferraris; Italy
1980 Moscow	Corneliu Ion; Romania	Jürgen Wiefel; East Germany	Gerhard Petritsch; Austria
1984 Los Angeles	Takeo Kamachi; Japan	Corneliu Ion; Romania	Rauno Bies; Finland
1988 Seoul	Afanasijs Kuzmins; Soviet Union	Ralf Schumann; East Germany	Zoltán Kovács; Hungary
1992 Barcelona	Ralf Schumann; Germany	Afanasijs Kuzmins; Latvia	Vladimir Vokhmyanin; Unified Team
1996 Atlanta	Ralf Schumann; Germany	Emil Milev; Bulgaria	Vladimir Vokhmyanin; Kazakhstan
2000 Sydney	Sergei Alifirenko; Russia	Michel Ansermet; Switzerland	Iulian Raicea; Romania
2004 Athens	Ralf Schumann; Germany	Sergei Polyakov; Russia	Sergei Alifirenko; Russia
2008 Beijing	Oleksandr Petriv; Ukraine	Ralf Schumann; Germany	Christian Reitz; Germany
2012 London	Leuris Pupo; Cuba	Vijay Kumar; India	Ding Feng; China
2016 Rio de Janeiro	Christian Reitz; Germany	Jean Quiquampoix; France	Li Yuehong; China
2020 Tokyo	Jean Quiquampoix; France	Leuris Pupo; Cuba	Li Yuehong; China
2024 Paris	Li Yuehong; China	Cho Yeong-jae; South Korea	Wang Xinjie; China
2028 Los Angeles			

==== Rifle three positions ====
This event has also been known as small-bore rifle three positions and free rifle three positions.

Games	Gold	Silver	Bronze
1952 Helsinki	Erling Kongshaug; Norway	Vilho Ylönen; Finland	Boris Andreyev; Soviet Union
1956 Melbourne	Anatoli Bogdanov; Soviet Union	Otakar Hořínek; Czechoslovakia	John Sundberg; Sweden
1960 Rome	Viktor Shamburkin; Soviet Union	Marat Niyasov; Soviet Union	Klaus Zähringer; United Team of Germany
1964 Tokyo	Lones Wigger; United States	Velichko Velichkov; Bulgaria	László Hammerl; Hungary
1968 Mexico City	Bernd Klingner; West Germany	John Writer; United States	Vitaly Parkhimovich; Soviet Union
1972 Munich	John Writer; United States	Lanny Bassham; United States	Werner Lippoldt; East Germany
1976 Montreal	Lanny Bassham; United States	Margaret Murdock; United States	Werner Seibold; West Germany
1980 Moscow	Viktor Vlasov; Soviet Union	Bernd Hartstein; East Germany	Sven Johansson; Sweden
1984 Los Angeles	Malcolm Cooper; Great Britain	Daniel Nipkov; Switzerland	Alister Allan; Great Britain
1988 Seoul	Malcolm Cooper; Great Britain	Alister Allan; Great Britain	Kirill Ivanov; Soviet Union
1992 Barcelona	Hrachya Petikyan; Unified Team	Robert Foth; United States	Ryohei Koba; Japan
1996 Atlanta	Jean-Pierre Amat; France	Sergey Belyayev; Kazakhstan	Wolfram Waibel; Austria
2000 Sydney	Rajmond Debevec; Slovenia	Juha Hirvi; Finland	Harald Stenvaag; Norway
2004 Athens	Jia Zhanbo; China	Michael Anti; United States	Christian Planer; Austria
2008 Beijing	Qiu Jian; China	Jury Sukhorukov; Ukraine	Rajmond Debevec; Slovenia
2012 London	Niccolò Campriani; Italy	Kim Jong-hyun; South Korea	Matthew Emmons; United States
2016 Rio de Janeiro	Niccolò Campriani; Italy	Sergey Kamenskiy; Russia	Alexis Raynaud; France
2020 Tokyo	Zhang Changhong; China	Sergey Kamenskiy; ROC	Milenko Sebić; Serbia
2024 Paris	Liu Yukun; China	Serhiy Kulish; Ukraine	Swapnil Kusale; India
2028 Los Angeles			

From 1972 to 1980, this event was mixed (open to both men and women shooters), although only one medal was won by a woman at these Games – Margaret Murdock's silver medal in 1976.

==== Skeet ====
Games	Gold	Silver	Bronze
1968 Mexico City	Yevgeni Petrov; Soviet Union	Romano Garagnani; Italy	Konrad Wirnhier; West Germany
1972 Munich	Konrad Wirnhier; West Germany	Yevgeni Petrov; Soviet Union	Michael Buchheim; East Germany
1976 Montreal	Josef Panáček; Czechoslovakia	Eric Swinkels; Netherlands	Wiesław Gawlikowski; Poland
1980 Moscow	Hans Kjeld Rasmussen; Denmark	Lars-Göran Carlsson; Sweden	Roberto Castrillo; Cuba
1984 Los Angeles	Matthew Dryke; United States	Ole Riber Rasmussen; Denmark	Luca Scribani Rossi; Italy
1988 Seoul	Axel Wegner; East Germany	Alfonso de Iruarrizaga; Chile	Jorge Guardiola; Spain
1992 Barcelona	Zhang Shan; China	Juan Giha; Peru	Bruno Rossetti; Italy
1996 Atlanta	Ennio Falco; Italy	Mirosław Rzepkowski; Poland	Andrea Benelli; Italy
2000 Sydney	Mykola Milchev; Ukraine	Petr Málek; Czech Republic	James Graves; United States
2004 Athens	Andrea Benelli; Italy	Marko Kemppainen; Finland	Juan Miguel Rodríguez; Cuba
2008 Beijing	Vincent Hancock; United States	Tore Brovold; Norway	Anthony Terras; France
2012 London	Vincent Hancock; United States	Anders Golding; Denmark	Nasser Al-Attiyah; Qatar
2016 Rio de Janeiro	Gabriele Rossetti; Italy	Marcus Svensson; Sweden	Abdullah Al-Rashidi; Independent Olympic Athletes
2020 Tokyo	Vincent Hancock; United States	Jesper Hansen; Denmark	Abdullah Al-Rashidi; Kuwait
2024 Paris	Vincent Hancock; United States	Conner Prince; United States	Lee Meng-yuan; Chinese Taipei
2028 Los Angeles			

From 1972 to 1992, this event was mixed (open to both men and women shooters), although only one medal was won by a woman at these Games – Zhang Shan's gold medal in 1992.

==== Trap ====
Games	Gold	Silver	Bronze
1900 Paris	Roger de Barbarin; France	René Guyot; Belgium	Justinien de Clary; France
1904 St. Louis	not included in the Olympic program		
1908 London	Walter Ewing; Canada	George Beattie; Canada	Alexander Maunder; Great Britain
1908 London	Walter Ewing; Canada	George Beattie; Canada	Anastasios Metaxas; Greece
1912 Stockholm	James Graham; United States	Alfred Goeldel; Germany	Harry Blau; Russian Empire
1920 Antwerp	Mark Arie; United States	Frank Troeh; United States	Frank Wright; United States
1924 Paris	Gyula Halasy; Hungary	Konrad Huber; Finland	Frank Hughes; United States
1928–1948	not included in the Olympic program		
1952 Helsinki	George Genereux; Canada	Knut Holmqvist; Sweden	Hans Liljedahl; Sweden
1956 Melbourne	Galliano Rossini; Italy	Adam Smelczyński; Poland	Alessandro Ciceri; Italy
1960 Rome	Ion Dumitrescu; Romania	Galliano Rossini; Italy	Sergei Kalinin; Soviet Union
1964 Tokyo	Ennio Mattarelli; Italy	Pavel Senichev; Soviet Union	William Morris; United States
1968 Mexico City	John Braithwaite; Great Britain	Thomas Garrigus; United States	Kurt Czekalla; East Germany
1972 Munich	Angelo Scalzone; Italy	Michel Carrega; France	Silvano Basagni; Italy
1976 Montreal	Donald Haldeman; United States	Armando Silva; Portugal	Ubaldesco Baldi; Italy
1980 Moscow	Luciano Giovannetti; Italy	Rustam Yambulatov; Soviet Union	Jörg Damme; East Germany
1984 Los Angeles	Luciano Giovannetti; Italy	Francisco Boza; Peru	Daniel Carlisle; United States
1988 Seoul	Dmitry Monakov; Soviet Union	Miloslav Bednařík; Czechoslovakia	Frans Peeters; Belgium
1992 Barcelona	Petr Hrdlička; Czechoslovakia	Kazumi Watanabe; Japan	Marco Venturini; Italy
1996 Atlanta	Michael Diamond; Australia	Josh Lakatos; United States	Lance Bade; United States
2000 Sydney	Michael Diamond; Australia	Ian Peel; Great Britain	Giovanni Pellielo; Italy
2004 Athens	Aleksei Alipov; Russia	Giovanni Pellielo; Italy	Adam Vella; Australia
2008 Beijing	David Kostelecký; Czech Republic	Giovanni Pellielo; Italy	Aleksei Alipov; Russia
2012 London	Giovanni Cernogoraz; Croatia	Massimo Fabbrizi; Italy	Fehaid Al-Deehani; Kuwait
2016 Rio de Janeiro	Josip Glasnović; Croatia	Giovanni Pellielo; Italy	Edward Ling; Great Britain
2020 Tokyo	Jiří Lipták; Czech Republic	David Kostelecký; Czech Republic	Matthew Coward-Holley; Great Britain
2024 Paris	Nathan Hales; Great Britain	Qi Ying; China	Jean Pierre Brol; Guatemala
2028 Los Angeles			

=== Women ===
==== Air pistol ====
Games	Gold	Silver	Bronze
1988 Seoul	Jasna Šekarić; Yugoslavia	Nino Salukvadze; Soviet Union	Marina Dobrancheva; Soviet Union
1992 Barcelona	Marina Logvinenko; Unified Team	Jasna Šekarić; Independent Olympic Participants	Mariya Grozdeva; Bulgaria
1996 Atlanta	Olga Kuznetsova; Russia	Marina Logvinenko; Russia	Mariya Grozdeva; Bulgaria
2000 Sydney	Tao Luna; China	Jasna Šekarić; FR Yugoslavia	Annemarie Forder; Australia
2004 Athens	Olena Kostevych; Ukraine	Jasna Šekarić; Serbia and Montenegro	Mariya Grozdeva; Bulgaria
2008 Beijing	Guo Wenjun; China	Natalia Paderina; Russia	Nino Salukvadze; Georgia
2012 London	Guo Wenjun; China	Céline Goberville; France	Olena Kostevych; Ukraine
2016 Rio de Janeiro	Zhang Mengxue; China	Vitalina Batsarashkina; Russia	Anna Korakaki; Greece
2020 Tokyo	Vitalina Batsarashkina; ROC	Antoaenta Kostadinova; Bulgaria	Jiang Ranxin; China
2024 Paris	Oh Ye-jin; South Korea	Kim Ye-ji; South Korea	Manu Bhaker; India
2028 Los Angeles			

==== Air rifle ====
Games	Gold	Silver	Bronze
1984 Los Angeles	Pat Spurgin; United States	Edith Gufler; Italy	Wu Xiaoxuan; China
1988 Seoul	Irina Shilova; Soviet Union	Silvia Sperber; West Germany	Anna Malukhina; Soviet Union
1992 Barcelona	Yeo Kab-soon; South Korea	Vessela Letcheva; Bulgaria	Aranka Binder; Independent Olympic Participants
1996 Atlanta	Renata Mauer; Poland	Petra Horneber; Germany	Aleksandra Ivošev; FR Yugoslavia
2000 Sydney	Nancy Johnson; United States	Kang Cho-hyun; South Korea	Gao Jing; China
2004 Athens	Du Li; China	Lioubov Galkina; Russia	Kateřina Kůrková; Czech Republic
2008 Beijing	Kateřina Emmons; Czech Republic	Lioubov Galkina; Russia	Snježana Pejčić; Croatia
2012 London	Yi Siling; China	Sylwia Bogacka; Poland	Yu Dan; China
2016 Rio de Janeiro	Virginia Thrasher; United States	Du Li; China	Yi Siling; China
2020 Tokyo	Yang Qian; China	Anastasiia Galashina; ROC	Nina Christen; Switzerland
2024 Paris	Ban Hyo-jin; South Korea	Huang Yuting; China	Audrey Gogniat; Switzerland
2028 Los Angeles			

==== Pistol ====
This event has also been known as sport pistol.

Games	Gold	Silver	Bronze
1984 Los Angeles	Linda Thom; Canada	Ruby Fox; United States	Patricia Dench; Australia
1988 Seoul	Nino Salukvadze; Soviet Union	Tomoko Hasegawa; Japan	Jasna Šekarić; Yugoslavia
1992 Barcelona	Marina Logvinenko; Unified Team	Li Duihong; China	Dorjsürengiin Mönkhbayar; Mongolia
1996 Atlanta	Li Duihong; China	Diana Iorgova; Bulgaria	Marina Logvinenko; Russia
2000 Sydney	Maria Grozdeva; Bulgaria	Tao Luna; China	Lalita Yauhleuskaya; Belarus
2004 Athens	Maria Grozdeva; Bulgaria	Lenka Hyková; Czech Republic	Irada Ashumova; Azerbaijan
2008 Beijing	Chen Ying; China	Otryadyn Gündegmaa; Mongolia	Munkhbayar Dorjsuren; Germany
2012 London	Kim Jang-mi; South Korea	Chen Ying; China	Olena Kostevych; Ukraine
2016 Rio de Janeiro	Anna Korakaki; Greece	Monika Karsch; Germany	Heidi Diethelm Gerber; Switzerland
2020 Tokyo	Vitalina Batsarashkina; ROC	Kim Min-jung; South Korea	Xiao Jiaruixuan; China
2024 Paris	Yang Ji-in; South Korea	Camille Jedrzejewski; France	Veronika Major; Hungary
2028 Los Angeles			

==== Rifle three positions ====
This event has also been known as standard rifle and sport rifle.

Games	Gold	Silver	Bronze
1984 Los Angeles	Wu Xiaoxuan; China	Ulrike Holmer; West Germany	Wanda Jewell; United States
1988 Seoul	Silvia Sperber; West Germany	Vessela Letcheva; Bulgaria	Valentina Cherkasova; Soviet Union
1992 Barcelona	Launi Meili; United States	Nonka Matova; Bulgaria	Małgorzata Książkiewicz; Poland
1996 Atlanta	Aleksandra Ivošev; FR Yugoslavia	Irina Gerasimenok; Russia	Renata Mauer; Poland
2000 Sydney	Renata Mauer; Poland	Tatiana Goldobina; Russia	Maria Feklistova; Russia
2004 Athens	Lyubov Galkina; Russia	Valentina Turisini; Italy	Wang Chengyi; China
2008 Beijing	Du Li; China	Kateřina Emmons; Czech Republic	Eglis Yaima Cruz; Cuba
2012 London	Jamie Lynn Gray; United States	Ivana Maksimović; Serbia	Adéla Sýkorová; Czech Republic
2016 Rio de Janeiro	Barbara Engleder; Germany	Zhang Binbin; China	Du Li; China
2020 Tokyo	Nina Christen; Switzerland	Yulia Zykova; ROC	Yulia Karimova; ROC
2024 Paris	Chiara Leone; Switzerland	Sagen Maddalena; United States	Zhang Qiongyue; China
2028 Los Angeles			

In addition to this list, Margaret Murdock (USA) won a silver medal in this event in 1976, when it was a mixed event (open to both men and women).

==== Skeet ====
Games	Gold	Silver	Bronze
2000 Sydney	Zemfira Meftahatdinova; Azerbaijan	Svetlana Demina; Russia	Diána Igaly; Hungary
2004 Athens	Diána Igaly; Hungary	Wei Ning; China	Zemfira Meftahatdinova; Azerbaijan
2008 Beijing	Chiara Cainero; Italy	Kim Rhode; United States	Christine Brinker; Germany
2012 London	Kim Rhode; United States	Wei Ning; China	Danka Barteková; Slovakia
2016 Rio de Janeiro	Diana Bacosi; Italy	Chiara Cainero; Italy	Kim Rhode; United States
2020 Tokyo	Amber English; United States	Diana Bacosi; Italy	Wei Meng; China
2024 Paris	Francisca Crovetto; Chile	Amber Rutter; Great Britain	Austen Smith; United States
2028 Los Angeles			

In addition to this list, Zhang Shan (CHN) won a gold medal in this event in 1992, when it was a mixed event (open to both men and women).

==== Trap ====
Games	Gold	Silver	Bronze
2000 Sydney	Daina Gudzinevičiūtė; Lithuania	Delphine Racinet; France	Gao E China
2004 Athens	Suzanne Balogh; Australia	María Quintanal; Spain	Lee Bo-na; South Korea
2008 Beijing	Satu Mäkelä-Nummela; Finland	Zuzana Štefečeková; Slovakia	Corey Cogdell; United States
2012 London	Jessica Rossi; Italy	Zuzana Štefečeková; Slovakia	Delphine Réau; France
2016 Rio de Janeiro	Catherine Skinner; Australia	Natalie Rooney; New Zealand	Corey Cogdell; United States
2020 Tokyo	Zuzana Rehák-Štefečeková; Slovakia	Kayle Browning; United States	Alessandra Perilli; San Marino
2024 Paris	Adriana Ruano; Guatemala	Silvana Stanco; Italy	Penny Smith; Australia
2028 Los Angeles			

=== Mixed ===
==== Air pistol, team ====
Games	Gold	Silver	Bronze
2020 Tokyo	China; Jiang Ranxin; Pang Wei	ROC (ROC); Vitalina Batsarashkina; Artem Chernousov	Ukraine; Olena Kostevych; Oleh Omelchuk
2024 Paris	Serbia; Zorana Arunović; Damir Mikec	Turkey; Şevval İlayda Tarhan; Yusuf Dikeç	India; Manu Bhaker; Sarabjot Singh
2028 Los Angeles			

==== Air rifle, team ====
Games	Gold	Silver	Bronze
2020 Tokyo	China; Yang Qian; Yang Haoran	United States; Mary Tucker; Lucas Kozeniesky	ROC (ROC); Yulia Karimova; Sergey Kamenskiy
2024 Paris	China; Huang Yuting; Sheng Lihao	South Korea; Keum Ji-hyeon; Park Ha-jun	Kazakhstan; Alexandra Le; Islam Satpayev
2028 Los Angeles			

==== Skeet, team ====
Games	Gold	Silver	Bronze
2024 Paris	Italy; Diana Bacosi; Gabriele Rossetti	United States; Austen Smith; Vincent Hancock	China; Jiang Yiting; Lyu Jianlin

==== Trap, team ====
Games	Gold	Silver	Bronze
2020 Tokyo	(Spain) Spain; Fátima Gálvez; Alberto Fernández	(San Marino) San Marino; Alessandra Perilli; Gian Marco Berti	(United States) United States; Madelynn Bernau; Brian Burrows
2028 Los Angeles			

== Discontinued events ==
=== Men's ===
==== Double trap ====
Games	Gold	Silver	Bronze
1996 Atlanta	Russell Mark; Australia	Albano Pera; Italy	Zhang Bing; China
2000 Sydney	Richard Faulds; Great Britain	Russell Mark; Australia	Fehaid Al-Deehani; Kuwait
2004 Athens	Ahmed Al Maktoum; United Arab Emirates	Rajyavardhan Singh Rathore; India	Wang Zheng; China
2008 Beijing	Walton Eller; United States	Francesco D'Aniello; Italy	Hu Binyuan; China
2012 London	Peter Wilson; Great Britain	Håkan Dahlby; Sweden	Vasily Mosin; Russia
2016 Rio de Janeiro	Fehaid Al-Deehani; Independent Olympic Athletes	Marco Innocenti; Italy	Steven Scott; Great Britain

==== 25 meter military pistol, individual ====
Games	Gold	Silver	Bronze
1896 Athens	John Paine; United States	Sumner Paine; United States	Nikolaos Morakis; Greece

==== 30 meter rapid fire pistol ====
Games	Gold	Silver	Bronze
1920 Antwerp	Guilherme Paraense; Brazil	Raymond Bracken; United States	Fritz Zulauf; Switzerland

==== 30 meter rapid fire pistol, team ====
Games	Gold	Silver	Bronze
1912 Stockholm	Sweden; Eric Carlberg; Vilhelm Carlberg; Johan Hübner von Holst; Paul Palén	Russian Empire; Amos Kash; Nikolai Melnitsky; Pavel Voyloshnikov; Grigori Panteleimonov	Great Britain; Hugh Durant; Albert Kempster; Charles Stewart; Horatio Poulter
1920 Antwerp	United States; Louis Harant; Alfred Lane; Carl Frederick; James H. Snook; Michael Kelly	Greece; Alexandros Theofilakis; Ioannis Theofilakis; Georgios Moraitinis; Alexandros Vrasivanopoulos; Iason Sappas	Switzerland; Fritz Zulauf; Joseph Jehle; Gustave Amoudruz; Hans Egli; Domenico Giambonini

==== 200 meter military rifle, individual ====
Games	Gold	Silver	Bronze
1896 Athens	Pantelis Karasevdas; Greece	Pavlos Pavlidis; Greece	Nicolaos Trikupis; Greece

==== 300 meter military rifle; prone, individual ====
Games	Gold	Silver	Bronze
1920 Antwerp	Otto Olsen; Norway	Léon Johnson; France	Fritz Kuchen; Switzerland

==== 300 meter military rifle; prone, team ====
Games	Gold	Silver	Bronze
1920 Antwerp	United States; Morris Fisher; Joseph Jackson; Willis Augustus Lee; Carl Osburn; Lloyd Spooner	France; Léon Johnson; André Parmentier; Achille Paroche; Georges Roes; Émile Rumeau	Finland; Voitto Kolho; Kalle Lappalainen; Veli Nieminen; Vilho Vauhkonen; Magnus Wegelius

==== 300 meter military rifle; standing, individual ====
Games	Gold	Silver	Bronze
1920 Antwerp	Carl Osburn; United States	Lars Jørgen Madsen; Denmark	Lawrence Nuesslein; United States

==== 300 meter military rifle; standing, team ====
Games	Gold	Silver	Bronze
1920 Antwerp	Denmark; Lars Jørgen Madsen; Niels Larsen; Anders Peterson; Erik Sætter-Lassen; Anders Peter Nielsen	United States; Carl Osburn; Lawrence Nuesslein; Lloyd Spooner; Willis Augustus Lee; Thomas Brown	Sweden; Olle Ericsson; Hugo Johansson; Leon Lagerlöf; Walfrid Hellman; Mauritz Eriksson

==== 300 meter military rifle, three positions ====
Games	Gold	Silver	Bronze
1912 Stockholm	Sándor Prokopp; Hungary	Carl Osburn; United States	Engebret Skogen; Norway

==== 300 meter military rifle, team ====
Games	Gold	Silver	Bronze
1908 London	United States; William Leuschner; William Martin; Charles Winder; Kellogg Casey; Ivan Eastman; Charles Benedict	Great Britain; Harcourt Ommundsen; Fleetwood Varley; Arthur Fulton; Philip Richardson; William Padgett; John Martin	Canada; William Smith; Charles Crowe; Bertram Williams; Dugald McInnis; William Eastcott; S. Harry Kerr
1912 Stockholm	United States; Cornelius Burdette; Allan Briggs; Harry Adams; John Jackson; Carl Osburn; Warren Sprout	Great Britain; Harcourt Ommundsen; Henry Burr; Edward Skilton; James Reid; Edward Parnell; Arthur Fulton	Sweden; Mauritz Eriksson; Werner Jernström; Tönnes Björkman; Carl Björkman; Bernhard Larsson; Hugo Johansson

==== 600 meter military rifle, individual ====
Games	Gold	Silver	Bronze
1920 Antwerp	Hugo Johansson; Sweden	Mauritz Eriksson; Sweden	Lloyd Spooner; United States

==== 600 meter military rifle, team ====
Games	Gold	Silver	Bronze
1920 Antwerp	United States; Dennis Fenton; Gunnery Schriver; Willis Augustus Lee; Lloyd Spooner; Joseph Jackson	South Africa; David Smith; Robert Bodley; Ferdinand Buchanan; George Harvey; Fred Morgan	Sweden; Mauritz Eriksson; Hugo Johansson; Gustaf Adolf Jonsson; Erik Blomqvist; Erik Ohlsson

==== 300 meter + 600 meter military rifle, team ====
Games	Gold	Silver	Bronze
1920 Antwerp	United States; Joseph Jackson; Willis Augustus Lee; Carl Osburn; Oliver Schriver; Lloyd Spooner	Norway; Albert Helgerud; Otto Olsen; Jacob Onsrud; Østen Østensen; Olaf Sletten	Switzerland; Eugen Addor; Joseph Jehle; Fritz Kuchen; Werner Schneeberger; Weibel

==== 100 metre running deer; single shot, individual ====
Games	Gold	Silver	Bronze
1908 London	Oscar Swahn; Sweden	Ted Ranken; Great Britain	Alexander Rogers; Great Britain
1912 Stockholm	Alfred Swahn; Sweden	Åke Lundeberg; Sweden	Nestori Toivonen; Finland
1920 Antwerp	Otto Olsen; Norway	Alfred Swahn; Sweden	Harald Natvig; Norway
1924 Paris	John Boles; United States	Cyril Mackworth-Praed; Great Britain	Otto Olsen; Norway

==== 100 metre running deer; single shot, team ====
Games	Gold	Silver	Bronze
1908 London	Sweden; Arvid Knöppel; Ernst Rosell; Alfred Swahn; Oscar Swahn	Great Britain; William Ellicott; William Russell Lane-Joynt; Charles Nix; Ted Ranken	None awarded
1912 Stockholm	Sweden; Alfred Swahn; Oscar Swahn; Åke Lundeberg; Per-Olof Arvidsson	United States; William McDonnell; Walter Winans; William Leuschner; William Libbey	Finland; Axel Fredrik Londen; Nestori Toivonen; Iivar Väänänen; Ernst Rosenqvist
1920 Antwerp	Norway; Einar Liberg; Ole Lilloe-Olsen; Harald Natvig; Hans Nordvik; Otto Olsen	Finland; Yrjö Kolho; Kalle Lappalainen; Toivo Tikkanen; Nestori Toivonen; Magnus Wegelius	United States; Thomas Brown; Willis Augustus Lee; Lawrence Nuesslein; Carl Osburn; Lloyd Spooner
1924 Paris	Norway; Einar Liberg; Ole Lilloe-Olsen; Harald Natvig; Otto Olsen	Sweden; Otto Hultberg; Mauritz Johansson; Fredric Landelius; Alfred Swahn	United States; John Boles; Raymond Coulter; Dennis Fenton; Walter Stokes

==== 100 metre running deer; double shot, individual ====
Games	Gold	Silver	Bronze
1908 London	Walter Winans; United States	Ted Ranken; Great Britain	Oscar Swahn; Sweden
1912 Stockholm	Åke Lundeberg; Sweden	Edward Benedicks; Sweden	Oscar Swahn; Sweden
1920 Antwerp	Ole Lilloe-Olsen; Norway	Fredric Landelius; Sweden	Einar Liberg; Norway
1924 Paris	Ole Lilloe-Olsen; Norway	Cyril Mackworth-Praed; Great Britain	Alfred Swahn; Sweden

==== 100 metre running deer; double shot, team ====
Games	Gold	Silver	Bronze
1920 Antwerp	Norway; Harald Natvig; Ole Lilloe-Olsen; Einar Liberg; Hans Nordvik; Thorstein Johansen	Sweden; Alfred Swahn; Oscar Swahn; Fredric Landelius; Bengt Lagercrantz; Edward Benedicks	Finland; Toivo Tikkanen; Magnus Wegelius; Nestori Toivonen; Vilho Vauhkonen; Yrjö Kolho
1924 Paris	Great Britain; Cyril Mackworth-Praed; Philip Neame; Herbert Perry; Allen Whitty	Norway; Einar Liberg; Ole Lilloe-Olsen; Harald Natvig; Otto Olsen	Sweden; Axel Ekblom; Mauritz Johansson; Fredric Landelius; Alfred Swahn

==== 100 metre running deer; single shot and double shot ====
Games	Gold	Silver	Bronze
1952 Helsinki	John Larsen; Norway	Per Olof Sköldberg; Sweden	Tauno Mäki; Finland
1956 Melbourne	Vitali Romanenko; Soviet Union	Olof Sköldberg; Sweden	Vladimir Sevryugin; Soviet Union

==== 300 meter rifle kneeling ====
Games	Gold	Silver	Bronze
1900 Paris	Konrad Stäheli; Switzerland	Emil Kellenberger; Switzerland	None awarded
1900 Paris	Konrad Stäheli; Switzerland	Anders Peter Nielsen; Denmark	None awarded

==== 300 meter rifle prone ====
Games	Gold	Silver	Bronze
1900 Paris	Achille Paroche; France	Anders Peter Nielsen; Denmark	Ole Østmo; Norway

==== 300 meter rifle standing ====
Games	Gold	Silver	Bronze
1900 Paris	Lars Jørgen Madsen; Denmark	Ole Østmo; Norway	Charles Paumier; Belgium

==== 300 meter rifle three positions ====
Games	Gold	Silver	Bronze
1896 Athens	Georgios Orphanidis; Greece	Ioannis Frangoudis; Greece	Viggo Jensen; Denmark
1900 Paris	Emil Kellenberger; Switzerland	Anders Peter Nielsen; Denmark	Paul Van Asbroeck; Belgium
1900 Paris	Emil Kellenberger; Switzerland	Anders Peter Nielsen; Denmark	Ole Østmo; Norway
1904 St. Louis	not included in the Olympic program		
1908 London	Albert Helgerud; Norway	Harry Simon; United States	Ole Sæther; Norway
1912 Stockholm	Paul Colas; France	Lars Jørgen Madsen; Denmark	Niels Larsen; Denmark
1920 Antwerp	Morris Fisher; United States	Niels Larsen; Denmark	Østen Østensen; Norway
1924–1936	not included in the Olympic program		
1948 London	Emil Grünig; Switzerland	Pauli Aapeli Janhonen; Finland	Willy Røgeberg; Norway
1952 Helsinki	Anatoli Bogdanov; Soviet Union	Robert Bürchler; Switzerland	Lev Vainshtein; Soviet Union
1956 Melbourne	Vasily Borisov; Soviet Union	Allan Erdman; Soviet Union	Vilho Ylönen; Finland
1960 Rome	Hubert Hammerer; Austria	Hansrudi Spillmann; Switzerland	Vasily Borisov; Soviet Union
1964 Tokyo	Gary Anderson; United States	Shota Kveliashvili; Soviet Union	Martin Gunnarsson; United States
1968 Mexico City	Gary Anderson; United States	Valentin Kornev; Soviet Union	Kurt Müller; Switzerland
1972 Munich	Lones Wigger; United States	Boris Melnik; Soviet Union	Lajos Papp; Hungary

In 1968 and 1972, this event was mixed (open to both men and women shooters), although all medals were won by men.

==== 300 meter rifle, team ====
Games	Gold	Silver	Bronze
1900 Paris	Switzerland; Franz Böckli; Alfred Grütter; Emil Kellenberger; Louis Richardet; Konrad Stäheli	Norway; Olaf Frydenlund; Helmer Hermandsen; Ole Østmo; Ole Sæther; Tom Seeberg	France; Auguste Cavadini; Maurice Lecoq; Léon Moreaux; Achille Paroche; René Thomas
1904 St. Louis	not included in the Olympic program		
1908 London	Norway; Julius Braathe; Albert Helgerud; Einar Liberg; Olaf Sæther; Ole Sæther; Gudbrand Skatteboe	Sweden; Per-Olof Arvidsson; Janne Gustafsson; Axel Jansson; Gustaf Adolf Jonsson; Claës Rundberg; Gustav-Adolf Sjöberg	France; Eugène Balme; Raoul de Boigne; Albert Courquin; Léon Johnson; Maurice Lecoq; André Parmentier
1912 Stockholm	Sweden; Mauritz Eriksson; Hugo Johansson; Erik Blomqvist; Carl Björkman; Bernhard Larsson; Gustaf Jonsson	Norway; Gudbrand Skatteboe; Ole Sæther; Østen Østensen; Albert Helgerud; Olaf Sæther; Einar Liberg	Denmark; Ole Olsen; Lars Jørgen Madsen; Niels Larsen; Niels Andersen; Laurits Larsen; Jens Hajslund
1920 Antwerp	United States; Morris Fisher; Willis Augustus Lee; Dennis Fenton; Carl Osburn; Lloyd Spooner	Norway; Otto Olsen; Albert Helgerud; Olaf Sletten; Østen Østensen; Jacob Onsrud	Switzerland; Fritz Kuchen; Albert Tröndle; Arnold Rösli; Walter Lienhard; Caspar Widmer
1924 Paris	United States; Raymond Coulter; Joseph Crockett; Morris Fisher; Sidney Hinds; Walter Stokes	France; Paul Colas; Albert Courquin; Pierre Hardy; Georges Roes; Émile Rumeau	Haiti; Ludovic Augustin; Destin Destine; Eloi Metullus; Astrel Rolland; Ludovic Valborge

==== 600 meter rifle, prone ====
Games	Gold	Silver	Bronze
1912 Stockholm	Paul Colas; France	Carl Osburn; United States	John Jackson; United States
1920 Antwerp	not included in the Olympic program		
1924 Paris	Morris Fisher; United States	Carl Osburn; United States	Niels Larsen; Denmark

==== 1000 yard rifle, prone ====
Games	Gold	Silver	Bronze
1908 London	Joshua Millner; Great Britain	Kellogg Casey; United States	Maurice Blood; Great Britain

==== rifle, disappearing target ====
Games	Gold	Silver	Bronze
1908 London	William Styles; Great Britain	Harold Hawkins; Great Britain	Edward Amoore; Great Britain

==== rifle, moving target ====
Games	Gold	Silver	Bronze
1908 London	John Fleming; Great Britain	Maurice Matthews; Great Britain	William Marsden; Great Britain

==== rifle, stationary target ====
Games	Gold	Silver	Bronze
1908 London	Arthur Carnell; Great Britain	Harold Humby; Great Britain	George Barnes; Great Britain

==== 10 meter running target ====
Games	Gold	Silver	Bronze
1992 Barcelona	Michael Jakosits; Germany	Anatoli Asrabayev; Unified Team	Luboš Račanský; Czechoslovakia
1996 Atlanta	Yang Ling; China	Xiao Jun; China	Miroslav Januš; Czech Republic
2000 Sydney	Yang Ling; China	Oleg Moldovan; Moldova	Niu Zhiyuan; China
2004 Athens	Manfred Kurzer; Germany	Aleksandr Blinov; Russia	Dimitri Lykin; Russia

==== 50 meter running target ====
Games	Gold	Silver	Bronze
1972 Munich	Yakov Zheleznyak; Soviet Union	Helmut Bellingrodt; Colombia	John Kynoch; Great Britain
1976 Montreal	Aleksandr Gazov; Soviet Union	Aleksandr Kedyarov; Soviet Union	Jerzy Greszkiewicz; Poland
1980 Moscow	Igor Sokolov; Soviet Union	Thomas Pfeffer; East Germany	Aleksandr Gazov; Soviet Union
1984 Los Angeles	Li Yuwei; China	Helmut Bellingrodt; Colombia	Huang Shiping; China
1988 Seoul	Tor Heiestad; Norway	Huang Shiping; China	Gennadi Avramenko; Soviet Union

From 1972 to 1980, this event was mixed (open to both men and women shooters), although all competitors were men and all medals were won by men at these Games.

==== 50 meter pistol, individual ====
This event has also been known as free pistol.

Games	Gold	Silver	Bronze
1896 Athens	Sumner Paine; United States	Holger Nielsen; Denmark	Ioannis Frangoudis; Greece
1900 Paris	Karl Röderer; Switzerland	Achille Paroche; France	Konrad Stäheli; Switzerland
1904 St. Louis	not included in the Olympic program		
1908 London	Paul Van Asbroeck; Belgium	Réginald Storms; Belgium	James Gorman; United States
1912 Stockholm	Alfred Lane; United States	Peter Dolfen; United States	Charles Stewart; Great Britain
1920 Antwerp	Karl Frederick; United States	Afrânio da Costa; Brazil	Alfred Lane; United States
1924–1932	not included in the Olympic program		
1936 Berlin	Torsten Ullman; Sweden	Erich Krempel; Germany	Charles des Jammonières; France
1948 London	Edwin Vasquez Cam; Peru	Rudolf Schnyder; Switzerland	Torsten Ullman; Sweden
1952 Helsinki	Huelet Benner; United States	Angel Leon de Gozalo; Spain	Ambrus Balogh; Hungary
1956 Melbourne	Pentti Linnosvuo; Finland	Makhmud Umarov; Soviet Union	Offutt Pinion; United States
1960 Rome	Alexey Gushchin; Soviet Union	Makhmud Umarov; Soviet Union	Yoshihisa Yoshikawa; Japan
1964 Tokyo	Väinö Markkanen; Finland	Franklin Green; United States	Yoshihisa Yoshikawa; Japan
1968 Mexico City	Grigory Kosykh; Soviet Union	Heinz Mertel; West Germany	Harald Vollmar; East Germany
1972 Munich	Ragnar Skanåker; Sweden	Daniel Iuga; Romania	Rudolf Dollinger; Austria
1976 Montreal	Uwe Potteck; East Germany	Harald Vollmar; East Germany	Rudolf Dollinger; Austria
1980 Moscow	Aleksandr Melentyev; Soviet Union	Harald Vollmar; East Germany	Lubtcho Diakov; Bulgaria
1984 Los Angeles	Xu Haifeng; China	Ragnar Skanåker; Sweden	Wang Yifu; China
1988 Seoul	Sorin Babii; Romania	Ragnar Skanåker; Sweden	Igor Basinski; Soviet Union
1992 Barcelona	Kanstantsin Lukashyk; Unified Team	Wang Yifu; China	Ragnar Skanåker; Sweden
1996 Atlanta	Boris Kokorev; Russia	Igor Basinski; Belarus	Roberto Di Donna; Italy
2000 Sydney	Tanyu Kiryakov; Bulgaria	Igor Basinski; Belarus	Martin Tenk; Czech Republic
2004 Athens	Mikhail Nestruyev; Russia	Jin Jong-oh; South Korea	Kim Jong-su; North Korea
2008 Beijing	Jin Jong-oh; South Korea	Tan Zongliang; China	Vladimir Isakov; Russia
2012 London	Jin Jong-oh; South Korea	Choi Young-rae; South Korea	Wang Zhiwei; China
2016 Rio de Janeiro	Jin Jong-oh; South Korea	Hoàng Xuân Vinh; Vietnam	Kim Song-guk; North Korea

==== 50 meter pistol, team ====
Games	Gold	Silver	Bronze
1900 Paris	Switzerland; Friedrich Lüthi; Paul Probst; Louis Richardet; Karl Röderer; Konrad Stäheli	France; Louis Dutfoy; Maurice Lecoq; Léon Moreaux; Achille Paroche; Jules Trinité	Netherlands; Solko van den Bergh; Antonius Bouwens; Dirk Boest Gips; Henrik Sillem; Anthony Sweijs
1904 St. Louis	not included in the Olympic program		
1908 London	United States; James Gorman; Irving Calkins; John Dietz; Charles Axtell	Belgium; Paul Van Asbroeck; Réginald Storms; Charles Paumier du Verger; Rene Englebert	Great Britain; Jesse Wallingford; Geoffrey Coles; Henry Lynch-Staunton; William Ellicott
1912 Stockholm	United States; Alfred Lane; Harry Sears; Peter Dolfen; John Dietz	Sweden; Georg de Laval; Eric Carlberg; Vilhelm Carlberg; Erik Boström	Great Britain; Horatio Poulter; Hugh Durant; Albert Kempster; Charles Stewart
1920 Antwerp	United States; Carl Frederick; Alfred Lane; Raymond Bracken; James H. Snook; Michael Kelly	Sweden; Anders Andersson; Casimir Reuterskiöld; Gunnar Gabrielsson; Sigvard Hultcrantz; Anders Johnson	Brazil; Afrânio da Costa; Sebastião Wolf; Dario Barbosa; Fernando Soledade; Guilherme Paraense

==== 25 meter rifle, individual ====
Games	Gold	Silver	Bronze
1912 Stockholm	Vilhelm Carlberg; Sweden	Johan Hübner von Holst; Sweden	Gideon Ericsson; Sweden

==== 25 meter rifle, team ====
Games	Gold	Silver	Bronze
1912 Stockholm	Sweden; Johan Hübner von Holst; Eric Carlberg; Vilhelm Carlberg; Gustaf Boivie	Great Britain; William Pimm; Joseph Pepé; William Milne; William Styles	United States; Frederick Hird; Warren Sprout; William McDonnell; William Leuschner

==== 50 meter rifle, team ====
Games	Gold	Silver	Bronze
1908 London	Great Britain; Edward Amoore; Harold Humby; Maurice Matthews; William Pimm	Sweden; Eric Carlberg; Vilhelm Carlberg; Franz-Albert Schartau; Johan Hübner von Holst	France; Henri Bonnefoy; Paul Colas; Léon Lécuyer; André Regaud
1912 Stockholm	Great Britain; William Pimm; Edward Lessimore; Joseph Pepé; Robert Murray	Sweden; Arthur Nordenswan; Eric Carlberg; Ruben Örtegren; Vilhelm Carlberg	United States; Warren Sprout; William Leuschner; Frederick Hird; Carl Osburn
1920 Antwerp	United States; Lawrence Nuesslein; Arthur Rothrock; Willis Augustus Lee; Dennis Fenton; Gunnery Schriver	Sweden; Sigvard Hultcrantz; Erik Ohlsson; Leon Lagerlöf; Ragnar Stare; Olle Ericsson	Norway; Østen Østensen; Olaf Sletten; Anton Olsen; Sigvart Johansen; Albert Helgerud

==== 50 meter rifle prone ====
This event has also been known as small-bore rifle prone and free rifle prone.

Games	Gold	Silver	Bronze
1912 Stockholm	Frederick Hird; United States	William Milne; Great Britain	Henry Burt; Great Britain
1920 Antwerp	Lawrence Nuesslein; United States	Arthur Rothrock; United States	Dennis Fenton; United States
1924 Paris	Pierre Coquelin de Lisle; France	Marcus Dinwiddie; United States	Josias Hartmann; Switzerland
1928 Amsterdam	not included in the Olympic program		
1932 Los Angeles	Bertil Rönnmark; Sweden	Gustavo Huet; Mexico	Zoltán Soós-Ruszka Hradetzky; Hungary
1936 Berlin	Willy Røgeberg; Norway	Ralph Berzsenyi; Hungary	Władysław Karaś; Poland
1948 London	Arthur Cook; United States	Walter Tomsen; United States	Jonas Jonsson; Sweden
1952 Helsinki	Iosif Sîrbu; Romania	Boris Andreyev; Soviet Union	Arthur Jackson; United States
1956 Melbourne	Gerald Ouellette; Canada	Vasily Borisov; Soviet Union	Gil Boa; Canada
1960 Rome	Peter Kohnke; United Team of Germany	James Enoch Hill; United States	Enrico Forcella; Venezuela
1964 Tokyo	László Hammerl; Hungary	Lones Wigger; United States	Tommy Pool; United States
1968 Mexico City	Jan Kůrka; Czechoslovakia	László Hammerl; Hungary	Ian Ballinger; New Zealand
1972 Munich	Li Ho-Jun; North Korea	Victor Auer; United States	Nicolae Rotaru; Romania
1976 Montreal	Karlheinz Smieszek; West Germany	Ulrich Lind; West Germany	Gennadi Lushchikov; Soviet Union
1980 Moscow	Károly Varga; Hungary	Hellfried Heilfort; East Germany	Petar Zapryanov; Bulgaria
1984 Los Angeles	Edward Etzel; United States	Michel Bury; France	Michael Sullivan; Great Britain
1988 Seoul	Miroslav Varga; Czechoslovakia	Cha Young-chul; South Korea	Attila Záhonyi; Hungary
1992 Barcelona	Lee Eun-chul; South Korea	Harald Stenvaag; Norway	Stevan Pletikosić; Independent Olympic Participants
1996 Atlanta	Christian Klees; Germany	Sergey Belyayev; Kazakhstan	Jozef Gönci; Slovakia
2000 Sydney	Jonas Edman; Sweden	Torben Grimmel; Denmark	Sergei Martynov; Belarus
2004 Athens	Matthew Emmons; United States	Christian Lusch; Germany	Sergei Martynov; Belarus
2008 Beijing	Artur Ayvazyan; Ukraine	Matthew Emmons; United States	Warren Potent; Australia
2012 London	Sergei Martynov; Belarus	Lionel Cox; Belgium	Rajmond Debevec; Slovenia
2016 Rio de Janeiro	Henri Junghänel; Germany	Kim Jong-hyun; South Korea	Kirill Grigoryan; Russia

==== Trap, team ====
Games	Gold	Silver	Bronze
1908 London	Great Britain; Alexander Maunder; John Pike; Charles Palmer; John Postans; Frederic Moore; Percy Easte	Canada; Walter Ewing; George Beattie; Arthur Westover; Mylie Fletcher; George Vivian; Donald McMackon	Great Britain; George Whitaker; George Herbert Skinner; John Butt; William Morris; Henry Creasey; Bob Hutton
1912 Stockholm	United States; Charles W. Billings; Ralph Spotts; John H. Hendrickson; James Graham; Edward Gleason; Frank Hall	Great Britain; John Butt; William Grosvenor; Harold Humby; Alexander Maunder; Charles Palmer; George Whitaker	Germany; Erich Graf von Bernstorff; Franz von Zedlitz und Leipe; Horst Goeldel; Albert Preuss; Erland Koch; Alfred Goeldel
1920 Antwerp	United States; Mark Arie; Horace Bonser; Jay Clark; Forest McNeir; Frank Troeh; Frank Wright	Belgium; Albert Bosquet; Joseph Cogels; Émile Dupont; Edouard Fesinger; Henri Quersin; Louis Van Tilt	Sweden; Per Kinde; Fredric Landelius; Erik Lundquist; Karl Richter; Erik Sökjer-Petersén; Alfred Swahn
1924 Paris	United States; Frederick Etchen; Frank Hughes; John Noel; Clarence Platt; Samuel Sharman; William Silkworth	Canada; William Barnes; George Beattie; John Black; Robert Montgomery; Samuel Newton; Samuel Vance	Finland; Werner Ekman; Konrad Huber; Robert Huber; Georg Nordblad; Toivo Tikkanen; Magnus Wegelius

=== Women's ===
==== Double trap ====
Games	Gold	Silver	Bronze
1996 Atlanta	Kim Rhode; United States	Susanne Kiermayer; Germany	Deserie Huddleston; Australia
2000 Sydney	Pia Hansen; Sweden	Deborah Gelisio; Italy	Kim Rhode; United States
2004 Athens	Kim Rhode; United States	Lee Bo Na; South Korea	Gao E China

== See also ==
- List of Asian Games medalists in shooting
- Shooting at the 1906 Intercalated Games — these Intercalated Games are no longer regarded as official Games by the current International Olympic Committee
