= Trap at the Olympics =

Olympic sport

ISSF Olympic trap at the Olympic Games
- Shooting pictogram

Overview
- Sport: Shooting
- Gender: Men and women
- Years held: Men: 1900, 1908–1924, 1952–2016; Women: 2000–2016

Reigning champion
- Men: Nathan Hales (GBR)
- Women: Adriana Ruano (GUA)

The "trap" event, officially the ISSF Olympic trap, is an event held at the Summer Olympic Games. The men's event was introduced in 1900, and held at most editions of the Games (except 1904 and 1928, when no shooting events were held, and 1932 to 1948) and every edition since 1952. As with most shooting events, it was nominally open to women from 1968 to 1980; the trap remained open to women through 1992. Very few women participated these years. The event returned to being men-only for 1996, though the new double trap had separate events for men and women that year. In 2000, a separate women's event was added and it has been contested at every Games since. There was also a men's team trap event held four times from 1908 to 1924.

== Medals ==
=== Men's trap medals ===
Games	Gold	Silver	Bronze
1896 Athens	Not held		
1900 Paris	Roger de Barbarin; France	René Guyot; France	Justinien de Clary; France
1904 St. Louis	Not held		
1908 London	Walter Ewing; Canada	George Beattie; Canada	Alexander Maunder; Great Britain Anastasios Metaxas; Greece
1912 Stockholm	James Graham; United States	Alfred Goeldel; Germany	Harry Blau; Russian Empire
1920 Antwerp	Mark Arie; United States	Frank Troeh; United States	Frank Wright; United States
1924 Paris	Gyula Halasy; Hungary	Konrad Huber; Finland	Frank Hughes; United States
1928 Amsterdam	Not held		
1932 Los Angeles	Not held		
1936 Berlin	Not held		
1948 London	Not held		
1952 Helsinki	George Genereux; Canada	Knut Holmqvist; Sweden	Hans Liljedahl; Sweden
1956 Melbourne	Galliano Rossini; Italy	Adam Smelczyński; Poland	Alessandro Ciceri; Italy
1960 Rome	Ion Dumitrescu; Romania	Galliano Rossini; Italy	Sergei Kalinin; Soviet Union
1964 Tokyo	Ennio Mattarelli; Italy	Pāvels Seničevs; Soviet Union	William Morris; Japan
1968 Mexico City (mixed)	Bob Braithwaite; Great Britain	Thomas Garrigus; United States	Kurt Czekalla; East Germany
1972 Munich (mixed)	Angelo Scalzone; Italy	Michel Carrega; France	Silvano Basagni; Italy
1976 Montreal (mixed)	Donald Haldeman; United States	Armando Marques; Portugal	Ubaldesco Baldi; Italy
1980 Moscow (mixed)	Luciano Giovannetti; Italy	Rustam Yambulatov; Soviet Union	Jörg Damme; East Germany
1984 Los Angeles (mixed)	Luciano Giovannetti; Italy	Francisco Boza; Peru	Daniel Carlisle; United States
1988 Seoul (mixed)	Dmitry Monakov; Soviet Union	Miloslav Bednařík; Czechoslovakia	Frans Peeters; Belgium
1992 Barcelona (mixed)	Petr Hrdlička; Czechoslovakia	Kazumi Watanabe; Japan	Marco Venturini; Italy
1996 Atlanta	Michael Diamond; Australia	Josh Lakatos; United States	Lance Bade; United States
2000 Sydney	Michael Diamond; Australia	Ian Peel; Great Britain	Giovanni Pellielo; Italy
2004 Athens	Alexey Alipov; Russia	Giovanni Pellielo; Italy	Adam Vella; Australia
2008 Beijing	David Kostelecký; Czech Republic	Giovanni Pellielo; Italy	Aleksei Alipov; Russia
2012 London	Giovanni Cernogoraz; Croatia	Massimo Fabbrizi; Italy	Fehaid Al-Deehani; Kuwait
2016 Rio de Janeiro	Josip Glasnović; Croatia	Giovanni Pellielo; Italy	Edward Ling; Great Britain
2020 Tokyo	Jiří Lipták; Czech Republic	David Kostelecký; Czech Republic	Matthew Coward-Holley; Great Britain
2024 Paris	Nathan Hales; Great Britain	Qi Ying; China	Jean Pierre Brol; Guatemala

==== Men's trap multiple medalists ====
Rank	Gymnast	Nation	Olympics	Gold	Silver	Bronze	Total
1	Luciano Giovannetti	Italy	1980–1984	2	0	0	2
1	Michael Diamond	Australia	1996–2000	2	0	0	2
3	Galliano Rossini	Italy	1956–1960	1	1	0	2
4	Aleksei Alipov	Russia	2004–2008	1	0	1	2
5	Giovanni Pellielo	Italy	2000–2008, 2016	0	3	1	4

==== Men's trap medalists by nation ====
Rank	Nation	Gold	Silver	Bronze	Total
1	Italy	5	5	5	15
2	United States	3	3	4	10
3	Canada	2	1	0	3
4	Australia	2	0	1	3
5	Croatia	2	0	0	2
6	France	1	2	1	4
6	Soviet Union	1	2	1	4
8	Great Britain	1	1	2	4
9	Czechoslovakia	1	1	0	2
10	Russia	1	0	1	2
11	Czech Republic	1	0	0	1
11	Hungary	1	0	0	1
11	Romania	1	0	0	1
14	Japan	0	1	1	2
14	Sweden	0	1	1	2
16	Finland	0	1	0	1
16	Germany	0	1	0	1
16	Peru	0	1	0	1
16	Poland	0	1	0	1
16	Portugal	0	1	0	1
21	East Germany	0	0	2	2
22	Belgium	0	0	1	1
22	Greece	0	0	1	1
22	Kuwait	0	0	1	1
22	Russian Empire	0	0	1	1

=== Women's trap medals ===
Games	Gold	Silver	Bronze
2000 Sydney	Daina Gudzinevičiūtė; Lithuania	Delphine Racinet; France	Gao E China
2004 Athens	Suzanne Balogh; Australia	María Quintanal; Spain	Lee Bo-na; South Korea
2008 Beijing	Satu Mäkelä-Nummela; Finland	Zuzana Štefečeková; Slovakia	Corey Cogdell; United States
2012 London	Jessica Rossi; Italy	Zuzana Štefečeková; Slovakia	Delphine Reau; France
2016 Rio de Janeiro	Catherine Skinner; Australia	Natalie Rooney; New Zealand	Corey Cogdell; United States
2020 Tokyo	Zuzana Rehák-Štefečeková; Slovakia	Kayle Browning; United States	Alessandra Perilli; San Marino
2024 Paris	Adriana Ruano; Guatemala	Silvana Stanco; Italy	Penny Smith; Australia

==== Women's trap multiple medalists ====
Rank	Gymnast	Nation	Olympics	Gold	Silver	Bronze	Total
1	Zuzana Štefečeková	Slovakia	2008–2012	0	2	0	2
2	Corey Cogdell	United States	2008, 2016	0	0	2	2

==== Women's trap medalists by nation ====
Rank	Nation	Gold	Silver	Bronze	Total
1	Australia	2	0	1	3
2	Slovakia	1	2	0	3
3	Italy	1	1	0	1
4	Finland	1	0	0	1
4	Lithuania	1	0	0	1
4	Guatemala	1	0	0	1
7	France	0	1	1	2
8	New Zealand	0	1	0	1
8	Spain	0	1	0	1
10	United States	0	1	2	3
11	China	0	0	1	1
11	South Korea	0	0	1	1
11	San Marino	0	0	1	1

=== Men's double trap medals ===
Games	Gold	Silver	Bronze
1996 Atlanta	Russell Mark; Australia	Albano Pera; Italy	Zhang Bing; China
2000 Sydney	Richard Faulds; Great Britain	Russell Mark; Australia	Fehaid Al-Deehani; Kuwait
2004 Athens	Ahmed Al Maktoum; United Arab Emirates	Rajyavardhan Singh Rathore; India	Wang Zheng; China
2008 Beijing	Walton Eller; United States	Francesco D'Aniello; Italy	Hu Binyuan; China
2012 London	Peter Wilson; Great Britain	Håkan Dahlby; Sweden	Vasily Mosin; Russia
2016 Rio de Janeiro	Fehaid Al-Deehani; Independent Olympic Athletes	Marco Innocenti; Italy	Steven Scott; Great Britain

==== Men's double trap multiple medalists ====
Rank	Gymnast	Nation	Olympics	Gold	Silver	Bronze	Total
1	Russell Mark	Australia	1996–2000	1	1	0	2
2	Fehaid Al-Deehani	Kuwait; Independent Olympic Athletes	2000, 2016	1	0	1	2

==== Men's double trap medalists by nation ====
Rank	Nation	Gold	Silver	Bronze	Total
1	Great Britain	2	0	1	3
2	Australia	1	1	0	2
3	Independent Olympic Athletes	1	0	0	1
3	United Arab Emirates	1	0	0	1
3	United States	1	0	0	1
6	Italy	0	3	0	3
7	India	0	1	0	1
7	Sweden	0	1	0	1
9	China	0	0	3	3
10	Kuwait	0	0	1	1
10	Russia	0	0	1	1

=== Women's double trap medals ===
Games	Gold	Silver	Bronze
1996 Atlanta	Kim Rhode; United States	Susanne Kiermayer; Germany	Deserie Huddleston; Australia
2000 Sydney	Pia Hansen; Sweden	Deborah Gelisio; Italy	Kim Rhode; United States
2004 Athens	Kim Rhode; United States	Lee Bo-na; South Korea	Gao E China

==== Women's double trap multiple medalists ====
Rank	Gymnast	Nation	Olympics	Gold	Silver	Bronze	Total
1	Kim Rhode	United States	1996–2004	2	0	1	3

==== Women's double trap medalists by nation ====
Rank	Nation	Gold	Silver	Bronze	Total
1	United States	2	0	1	3
2	Sweden	1	0	0	1
3	Germany	0	1	0	1
3	Italy	0	1	0	1
3	South Korea	0	1	0	1
6	Australia	0	0	1	1
6	China	0	0	1	1

=== Men's team trap medals ===
Games	Gold	Silver	Bronze
1908 Stockholm	Peter Easte, Alexander Maunder, Frank Moore, Charles Palmer, John Pike, John Postans; Great Britain	George Beattie, Walter Ewing, Mylie Fletcher, David McMackon, George Vivian, Arthur Westover; Canada	John Butt, Harold Creasey, Bob Hutton, William Morris, George Skinner, George Whitaker; Great Britain
1912 Stockholm	Charles Billings, Edward Gleason, James Graham, Frank Hall, John H. Hendrickson, Ralph Spotts; United States	John Butt, William Grosvenor, Harold Humby, Alexander Maunder, Charles Palmer, George Whitaker; Great Britain	Alfred Goeldel, Horst Goeldel, Erland Koch, Albert Preuß, Erich Graf von Bernstorff, Franz von Zedlitz und Leipe; Germany
1920 Antwerp	Mark Arie, Horace Bonser, Jay Clark, Forest McNeir, Frank Troeh, Frank Wright; United States	Albert Bosquet, Joseph Cogels, Émile Dupont, Edouard Fesinger, Henri Quersin, Louis Van Tilt, Casimir Reuterskiöld; Belgium	Per Kinde, Fredric Landelius, Erik Lundquist, Karl Richter, Erik Sökjer-Petersén, Alfred Swahn; Sweden
1924 Paris	Frederick Etchen, Frank Hughes, John Noel, Clarence Platt, Samuel Sharman, William Silkworth; United States	William Barnes, George Beattie, John Black, Robert Montgomery, Samuel Newton, Samuel Vance; Canada	Werner Ekman, Konrad Huber, Robert Huber, Georg Nordblad, Toivo Tikkanen, Magnus Wegelius; Finland
2020 Tokyo	Spain; Alberto Fernández; Fátima Gálvez	San Marino; Gian Marco Berti; Alessandra Perilli	United States; Brian Burrows; Madelynn Bernau

==== Men's team trap multiple medalists ====
Rank	Gymnast	Nation	Olympics	Gold	Silver	Bronze	Total
1	Alexander Maunder	Great Britain	1908–1912	1	1	0	2
1	Charles Palmer	Great Britain	1908–1912	1	1	0	2
3	George Beattie	Canada	1908, 1924	0	2	0	2
4	John Butt	Great Britain	1908–1912	0	1	1	2
4	George Whitaker	Great Britain	1908–1912	0	1	1	2

==== Men's team trap medalists by nation ====
Rank	Nation	Gold	Silver	Bronze	Total
1	United States	3	0	0	3
2	Great Britain	1	1	1	3
3	Canada	0	2	0	2
4	Belgium	0	1	0	1
5	Finland	0	0	1	1
5	Germany	0	0	1	1
5	Sweden	0	0	1	1
