= Shooting at the 1908 Summer Olympics =

Shooting at the Games of the IV Olympiad
- Venue: Bisley Ranges (rifle & pistol); Uxendon (shotgun)
- Dates: 8 – 11 July 1908
- No. of events: 15
- Competitors: 215 from 14 nations

Shooting at the 1908 Summer Olympics in London saw fifteen shooting events. Most of the events were held at Bisley, Surrey while the trap shooting events were held at Uxendon.

== Competition schedule ==
Legend
Q	Qualification	F	Final

Schedule
Event ↓ / Date →	Wed 8	Thu 9	Fri 10	Sat 11
Rifle
Men's 1000 yd free rifle		F		
Men's 300 m free rifle, 3 positions				F
Men's 300 m free rifle, team		F	F	
Men's military rifle, team			F	F
Men's stationary target small-bore rifle				F
Men's moving target small-bore rifle				F
Men's disappearing target small-bore rifle				F
Men's team small-bore rifle				F
Pistol
Men's 50 yd pistol			F	
Men's 50 yard team pistol				F
Shotgun
Men's trap	Q	Q		F
Men's team trap		Q	Q	F
Running deer
Men's single-shot running deer		F		
Men's double-shot running deer		F	F	
Men's team single-shot running deer			F	

== Medal summary ==
A total of 45 medals were won by 8 NOC's.

=== Medal table ===
* Host nation (Great Britain)

Rank	Nation	Gold	Silver	Bronze	Total
1	Great Britain*	6	7	8	21
2	United States	3	2	1	6
3	Sweden	2	2	1	5
4	Norway	2	0	1	3
5	Canada	1	2	1	4
6	Belgium	1	2	0	3
7	France	0	0	2	2
8	Greece	0	0	1	1
Totals (8 entries)		15	15	15	45

=== Events ===
Event	Gold	Silver	Bronze
1000 yd free rifle	Joshua Millner; Great Britain	Kellogg Casey; United States	Maurice Blood; Great Britain
300 m free rifle, three positions	Albert Helgerud; Norway	Harry Simon; United States	Ole Sæther; Norway
300 m free rifle, team	Norway; Julius Braathe; Albert Helgerud; Einar Liberg; Olaf Sæther; Ole Sæther; Gudbrand Skatteboe	Sweden; Per-Olof Arvidsson; Janne Gustafsson; Axel Jansson; Gustaf Adolf Jonsson; Claës Rundberg; Gustav-Adolf Sjöberg	France; Eugène Balme; Raoul de Boigne; Albert Courquin; Léon Johnson; Maurice Lecoq; André Parmentier
Team military rifle	United States; Charles Benedict; Kellogg Casey; Ivan Eastman; William Leuschner; William Martin; Charles Winder	Great Britain; Arthur Fulton; John Martin; Harcourt Ommundsen; Walter Padgett; Philip Richardson; Fleetwood Varley	Canada; Charles Crowe; William Eastcott; Harry Kerr; Dugald McInnis; William Smith; Bertram Williams
Stationary target small-bore rifle	Arthur Carnell; Great Britain	Harold Humby; Great Britain	George Barnes; Great Britain
Moving target small-bore rifle	John Fleming; Great Britain	Maurice Matthews; Great Britain	William Marsden; Great Britain
Disappearing target small-bore rifle	William Styles; Great Britain	Harold Hawkins; Great Britain	Edward Amoore; Great Britain
Team small-bore rifle	Great Britain; Edward Amoore; Harold Humby; Maurice Matthews; William Pimm	Sweden; Eric Carlberg; Vilhelm Carlberg; Johan Hübner von Holst; Franz-Albert Schartau	France; Henri Bonnefoy; Paul Colas; Léon Lécuyer; André Regaud
Single-shot running deer	Oscar Swahn; Sweden	Ted Ranken; Great Britain	Alexander Rogers; Great Britain
Double-shot running deer	Walter Winans; United States	Ted Ranken; Great Britain	Oscar Swahn; Sweden
Team single-shot running deer	Sweden; Arvid Knöppel; Ernst Rosell; Alfred Swahn; Oscar Swahn	Great Britain; William Ellicott; William Russell Lane-Joynt; Charles Nix; Ted Ranken	none awarded
Individual pistol	Paul Van Asbroeck; Belgium	Réginald Storms; Belgium	James Gorman; United States
Team pistol	United States; Charles Axtell; Irving Calkins; John Dietz; James Gorman	Belgium; René Englebert; Charles Paumier du Verger; Réginald Storms; Paul Van Asbroeck	Great Britain; Geoffrey Coles; William Ellicott; Henry Lynch-Staunton; Jesse Wallingford
Individual trap shooting	Walter Ewing; Canada	George Beattie; Canada	Alexander Maunder; Great Britain; Anastasios Metaxas; Greece
Team trap shooting	Great Britain; Percy Easte; Alexander Maunder; Frederic Moore; Charles Palmer; John Pike; John Postans	Canada; George Beattie; Walter Ewing; Mylie Fletcher; David McMackon; George Vivian; Arthur Westover	Great Britain; John Butt; Henry Creasey; Bob Hutton; William Morris; George Skinner; George Whitaker

== Participating nations ==
A total of 215 shooters from 14 nations competed at the London Games:

- Australasia (1)
- Belgium (10)
- Canada (22)
- Denmark (10)
- Finland (9)
- France (20)
- Germany (1)
- Great Britain (67)
- Greece (7)
- Hungary (2)
- Netherlands (17)
- Norway (13)
- Sweden (19)
- United States (17)

== Late arrival of the Russian team ==
Some sources claim that the Russian shooting team was 13 days late to the Olympics due to the Russian Empire still using the Julian calendar as opposed to the rest of Europe, which used the Gregorian system. The official report does not mention Russia, and it does mention Italy and Australia as "absent". Other authors doubt this claim, and note that Russia had been living next to Gregorian-calendar Europe for two centuries and was used to the difference.
