= Shooting at the 1908 Summer Olympics – Men's trap =

Sports shooting at the Olympics

Men's trap at the Games of the IV Olympiad
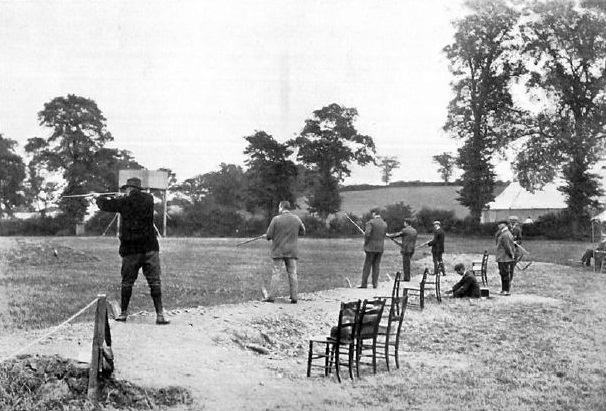
- British team
- Venue: Uxendon Shooting School Club
- Dates: 8–9 July 1908 (first round); 9 July 1908 (second round 11 July 1908 (final round)
- Competitors: 61 from 8 nations
- Winning score: 72 OR

Medalists
1st place, gold medalist(s)		Walter Ewing	Canada
2nd place, silver medalist(s)		George Beattie	Canada
3rd place, bronze medalist(s)		Alexander Maunder	Great Britain
3rd place, bronze medalist(s)		Anastasios Metaxas	Greece

The men's individual trap shooting competition was one of 15 shooting sports events on the Shooting at the 1908 Summer Olympics programme. It was held from 8 to 11 July. Each nation could enter up to 12 shooters. There were 61 competitors from 8 nations. Canada took the top two spots, with Walter Ewing earning gold and George Beattie silver. There were two bronze medals awarded after Alexander Maunder of Great Britain and Anastasios Metaxas of Greece tied for third place. The medals were the first in the event for all three nations (France had swept the medals in 1900). Ewing also received Lord Westbury's Cup as a challenge prize.

The weather was bad, with extreme rain and wind as well as low light.

== Background ==
This was the second appearance of what would become standardised as the men's ISSF Olympic trap event. The event was held at every Summer Olympics from 1896 to 1924 (except 1904, when no shooting events were held) and from 1952 to 2016; it was open to women from 1968 to 1996.

Belgium, Canada, Finland, Greece, the Netherlands, and Sweden each made their debut in the event. France and Great Britain both made their second appearance, having competed at the prior edition of the event in 1900.

== Competition format ==
Shooting was conducted in three rounds, with each shooter firing at 30 clay birds in the first round, 20 in the second, and 30 in the third. In the first and second rounds, and for 20 of the birds in the third round, the shooting was on "Team System," meaning that the shooter knew which trap the bird would come from but not the angle; for the final 10 birds of the third round, the shooting was on the "Single Fire" system, with unknown traps and angles. Eliminations took place after each round. These eliminations were supposed to remove half of the competitors between the first and second rounds, and half the remaining between the second and third; but the number of finalists was much greater than one-quarter the number of competitors.

28 shooters advanced to the final round, though 7 did not finish it. The highest possible aggregate score was 80 points.

== Records ==
Prior to this competition, the existing world and Olympic records were as follows.

World record	
Olympic record	New format

Walter Ewing set the initial Olympic record for the 80-shot event with 72 points.

== Schedule ==
Date	Time	Round
Wednesday 8 July 1908		First round
Thursday, 9 July 1908		First round, continued Second round
Saturday, 11 July 1908		Final round

== Results ==
The Official Report gives a list of competitors, but gives scores only for those reaching the final round.

Canada objected to the first day of scores and was permitted to re-shoot. John Postans of Great Britain withdrew, with no recorded reason but likely because of that decision; Postans had been tied with Charles Palmer and Bob Hutton for the lead at 23, but Canadian Walter Ewing shot a 27 in the re-shoot.

Rank	Shooter	Nation	Score			
Rank	Shooter	Nation	Round 1	Round 2	Round 3	Total
1st place, gold medalist(s)	Walter Ewing	Canada	27	18	27	72
2nd place, silver medalist(s)	George Beattie	Canada	21	17	22	60
3rd place, bronze medalist(s)	Alexander Maunder	Great Britain	21	14	22	57
3rd place, bronze medalist(s)	Anastasios Metaxas	Greece	21	14	22	57
5	Charles Palmer	Great Britain	23	12	20	55
5	Arthur Westover	Canada	21	12	22	55
7	Mylie Fletcher	Canada	22	9	22	53
7	Bob Hutton	Great Britain	23	10	20	53
7	John Wilson	Netherlands	20	13	20	53
10	Frederic Moore	Great Britain	21	11	20	52
11	George Whitaker	Great Britain	18	9	24	51
12	David McMackon	Canada	19	14	17	50
12	John Pike	Great Britain	22	12	16	50
14	Cornelis Viruly	Netherlands	18	13	17	48
15	Eduardus van Voorst tot Voorst	Netherlands	19	13	15	47
15	Franciscus van Voorst tot Voorst	Netherlands	18	14	15	47
17	Henry Creasey	Great Britain	22	9	15	46
17	Percy Easte	Great Britain	18	11	17	46
19	Gerald Merlin	Great Britain	18	10	17	45
20	William Morris	Great Britain	10	12	22	44
20	George Vivian	Canada	16	10	18	44
22	Reindert de Favauge	Netherlands	18	11	—	29
23	Émile Béjot	France	18	10	—	28
24	John Butt	Great Britain	15	11	—	26
25	Alfred Swahn	Sweden	13	9	—	22
26	Jacob Laan	Netherlands	13	8	—	21
27	Frank Parker	Canada	14	5	—	19
27	Edward Benedicks	Sweden	13	6	—	19
AC	John Postans	Great Britain	23	Withdrew	DNA	23
AC	M. Bucquet	France	Unknown		DNA	—
AC	C. A. A. Dudok de Wit	Netherlands	Unknown		DNA	—
AC	E. Fesingher	Belgium	Unknown		DNA	—
AC	Count de Fontenay	France	Unknown		DNA	—
AC	A. Fleury	France	Unknown		DNA	—
AC	L. Gernaert	Belgium	Unknown		DNA	—
AC	E. Herrmann	Belgium	Unknown		DNA	—
AC	R. W. Huber	Finland	Unknown		DNA	—
AC	Charles de Jaubert	France	Unknown		DNA	—
AC	Arvid Knöppel	Sweden	Unknown		DNA	—
AC	G. A. Knöppel	Sweden	Unknown		DNA	—
AC	P. Lefébure	France	Unknown		DNA	—
AC	P. Levé	France	Unknown		DNA	—
AC	A. G. E. Ljungberg	Sweden	Unknown		DNA	—
AC	A. F. Londen	Finland	Unknown		DNA	—
AC	P. L. Lucassen	Netherlands	Unknown		DNA	—
AC	L. de Lunden	Belgium	Unknown		DNA	—
AC	Frangiskos Mavrommatis	Greece	Unknown		DNA	—
AC	C. N. J. Moltzer	Netherlands	Unknown		DNA	—
AC	Georgios Orphanidis	Greece	Unknown		DNA	—
AC	Rudolph van Pallandt	Netherlands	Unknown		DNA	—
AC	H. L. R. Quersin	Belgium	Unknown		DNA	—
AC	Baron A. de Roest d'Alkemade	Belgium	Unknown		DNA	—
AC	Ernst Rosell	Sweden	Unknown		DNA	—
AC	Count S. de Rouville	France	Unknown		DNA	—
AC	E. Soufart	Belgium	Unknown		DNA	—
AC	Réginald Storms	Belgium	Unknown		DNA	—
AC	Oscar Swahn	Sweden	Unknown		DNA	—
AC	K. Tazer	Finland	Unknown		DNA	—
AC	L. Van Tilt	Belgium	Unknown		DNA	—
AC	G. J. Van der Vleit	Netherlands	Unknown		DNA	—
AC	P. W. Waller	Netherlands	Unknown		DNA	—

== Sources ==
- Cook, Theodore Andrea (1908). The Fourth Olympiad, Being the Official Report. London: British Olympic Association.
- De Wael, Herman (2001). "Shooting 1908". Herman's Full Olympians.
