= Shooting at the 1908 Summer Olympics – Men's disappearing target small-bore rifle =

Sports shooting at the Olympics

Men's disappearing target small-bore rifle at the Games of the IV Olympiad
- Venue: Bisley rifle range
- Date: 11 July 1908
- Competitors: 22 from 5 nations

Medalists
| 1st place, gold medalist(s) | | William Styles | Great Britain |
| 2nd place, silver medalist(s) | | Harold Hawkins | Great Britain |
| 3rd place, bronze medalist(s) | | Edward Amoore | Great Britain |

The men's disappearing target small-bore rifle was one of 15 events on the Shooting at the 1908 Summer Olympics programme. Regulation of the equipment used in the event was done through allowing the use of .22 or .297/.230 caliber ammunition. Magnifying and telescopic sights were prohibited. The target used was a three-quarter length silhouette, 4 inches high and 1.5 wide. It would appear at a distance of 25 yards for three seconds and then disappear for five until it had been seen a total of 15 times. A hit on the upper two-thirds of the figure counted for 3 points, while any other hit counted for 1. The maximum score was thus 45 points. Each nation could enter up to 12 shooters.

8 shooters scored the maximum possible score. The method of breaking the tie is unknown.

== Results ==
| Place | Shooter | Score |
|---|---|---|
| 1 | William Styles (GBR) | 45 |
| 2 | Harold Hawkins (GBR) | 45 |
| 3 | Edward Amoore (GBR) | 45 |
| 4 | William Milne (GBR) | 45 |
| 5 | James Milne (GBR) | 45 |
| 6 | Arthur Wilde (GBR) | 45 |
| 7 | Vilhelm Carlberg (SWE) | 45 |
| 8 | Harold Humby (GBR) | 45 |
| 9 | Eric Carlberg (SWE) | 42 |
| 9 | John Fleming (GBR) | 42 |
| 9 | Maurice Matthews (GBR) | 42 |
| 9 | Edward Newitt (GBR) | 42 |
| 9 | Otto von Rosen (SWE) | 42 |
| 9 | Franz-Albert Schartau (SWE) | 42 |
| 15 | Johan Hübner von Holst (SWE) | 39 |
| 15 | William Pimm (GBR) | 39 |
| 15 | Philip Plater (GBR) | 39 |
| 18 | William Hill (ANZ) | 36 |
| 19 | André Mercier (FRA) | 30 |
| 19 | Walter Winans (USA) | 30 |
| 21 | Léon Johnson (FRA) | 24 |
| 22 | Léon Tétart (FRA) | 21 |

== Sources ==
- Cook, Theodore Andrea (1908). The Fourth Olympiad, Being the Official Report. London: British Olympic Association.
- De Wael, Herman (2001). "Shooting 1908". Herman's Full Olympians.
