= Shooting at the 1908 Summer Olympics – Men's team trap =

Sports shooting at the Olympics

Men's team trap at the Games of the IV Olympiad
- Venue: Uxendon Shooting School Club
- Dates: 9–11 July
- Competitors: 24 from 3 nations

Medalists
| 1st place, gold medalist(s) | | Great Britain; Percy Easte, Alexander Maunder, Frederic Moore, Charles Palmer, John Pike, John Postans |
| 2nd place, silver medalist(s) | | Canada; George Beattie, Walter Ewing, Mylie Fletcher, David McMackon, George Vivian, Arthur Westover |
| 3rd place, bronze medalist(s) | | Great Britain; John Butt, Henry Creasey, Bob Hutton, William Morris, George Skinner, George Whitaker |

The men's team trap shooting competition was one of 15 shooting sports events on the Shooting at the 1908 Summer Olympics programme. Teams consisted of six shooters. Shooting was conducted in three rounds, with each shooter firing at 30 clay birds in the first, 25 in the second, and 50 in the third.

Each nation could enter up to 2 teams of 6 shooters. Great Britain entered two teams, with Canada and the Netherlands also entering a team each. Belgium, France, and Sweden initially registered teams, but their teams did not compete. The Dutch team was eliminated before the final round.

== Results ==
| Place | Nation | Shooter | Score | | | |
| Place | Nation | Shooter | Round 1 | Round 2 | Round 3 | Total |
|---|---|---|---|---|---|---|
| 1 | Great Britain #1 | Team total | 127 | 96 | 184 | 407 |
| 1 | Great Britain #1 | Alexander Maunder | 25 | 18 | 40 | 83 |
| 1 | Great Britain #1 | John Pike | 23 | 22 | 32 | 77 |
| 1 | Great Britain #1 | Charles Palmer | 25 | 12 | 34 | 71 |
| 1 | Great Britain #1 | John Postans | 16 | 14 | 31 | 61 |
| 1 | Great Britain #1 | Frederic Moore | 22 | 15 | 23 | 60 |
| 1 | Great Britain #1 | Percy Easte | 16 | 15 | 24 | 55 |
| 2 | Canada | Team total | 114 | 95 | 196 | 405 |
| 2 | Canada | Walter Ewing | 24 | 19 | 38 | 81 |
| 2 | Canada | George Beattie | 20 | 18 | 35 | 73 |
| 2 | Canada | Arthur Westover | 22 | 15 | 35 | 72 |
| 2 | Canada | Mylie Fletcher | 18 | 13 | 34 | 65 |
| 2 | Canada | George Vivian | 18 | 12 | 28 | 58 |
| 2 | Canada | David McMackon | 12 | 18 | 26 | 56 |
| 3 | Great Britain #2 | Team total | 106 | 84 | 182 | 372 |
| 3 | Great Britain #2 | George Whitaker | 15 | 18 | 37 | 70 |
| 3 | Great Britain #2 | George Skinner | 17 | 16 | 30 | 63 |
| 3 | Great Britain #2 | John Butt | 19 | 12 | 31 | 62 |
| 3 | Great Britain #2 | William Morris | 18 | 12 | 32 | 62 |
| 3 | Great Britain #2 | Henry Creasey | 20 | 14 | 25 | 59 |
| 3 | Great Britain #2 | Bob Hutton | 17 | 12 | 27 | 56 |
| 4 | Netherlands | Team total | Unknown | | — | 174 |
| 4 | Netherlands | John Wilson | Unknown | | — | 34 |
| 4 | Netherlands | Franciscus van Voorst tot Voorst | Unknown | | — | 34 |
| 4 | Netherlands | Cornelis Viruly | Unknown | | — | 28 |
| 4 | Netherlands | Eduardus van Voorst tot Voorst | Unknown | | — | 28 |
| 4 | Netherlands | Rudolph van Pallandt | Unknown | | — | 26 |
| 4 | Netherlands | Reindert de Favauge | Unknown | | — | 24 |

== Sources ==
- Cook, Theodore Andrea (1908). The Fourth Olympiad, Being the Official Report. London: British Olympic Association.
- De Wael, Herman (2001). "Shooting 1908". Herman's Full Olympians.
