= Reindert de Favauge =

Dutch sport shooter

Personal information
- Born: 22 December 1872 Bergen op Zoom, Netherlands
- Died: 8 October 1949 (aged 76) Bloemendaal, Netherlands

Sport
- Sport: Sports shooting

Romain "Reindert" Henri Theodor David de Favauge (22 December 1872 – 8 October 1949) was a Dutch sport shooter who competed at the 1908 Summer Olympics and the 1920 Summer Olympics. He was born in Bergen op Zoom and died in Bloemendaal.

In 1908, he finished fourth with the Dutch team in the team trap shooting event. In the individual trap competition he finished 22nd. Twelve years later, he finished sixth as a member of the Dutch team in the team clay pigeons event.
