= Fleetwood Varley =

British sport shooter

Personal information
- Born: 11 October 1862 London, England
- Died: 26 March 1936 (aged 73) Marylebone, London. England

Sport
- Sport: Sports shooting
Medal record
Men's shooting
Representing United Kingdom
Olympic Games
Silver medal – second place	1908 London	Military rifle, team

Fleetwood Ernest Varley (11 October 1862 – 26 March 1936) was a British sport shooter who competed in the 1908 Summer Olympics and 1912 Summer Olympics.

In the 1908 Olympics, Varley won a silver medal in the team military rifle event. Four years later, Varley was 50th in the 300 metre military rifle, three positions event and 27th in the 600 metre free rifle event.

== See also ==
- List of Olympic medalists in shooting
- Great Britain at the 1908 Summer Olympics
- Great Britain at the 1912 Summer Olympics
- Shooting at the 1908 Summer Olympics
