= Shooting at the 1920 Summer Olympics – Men's trap =

Olympic shooting event

Men's trap at the Games of the VII Olympiad
- Shooting pictogram
- Venue: Hoogboom Military Camp
- Dates: 23–24 July 1920
- Competitors: 18 from 7 nations
- Winning score: 95

Medalists
1st place, gold medalist(s)		Mark Arie	United States
2nd place, silver medalist(s)		Frank Troeh	United States
3rd place, bronze medalist(s)		Frank Wright	United States

The men's trap was a shooting sports event held as part of the Shooting at the 1920 Summer Olympics programme. It was the fourth appearance of the event. The competition was held on 23 and 24 July 1920 and 18 shooters from seven nations competed. The United States swept the podium (indeed, the five Americans took the top five places); it was the second sweep in the men's trap (France had done it in 1900). Mark Arie took the gold medal, the second consecutive victory by an American. Frank Troeh earned silver, while Frank Wright finished with bronze. Arie also received Lord Westbury's Cup, a challenge prize previously awarded in 1908 and 1912 to the winners of those years' men's trap competitions.

== Background ==
This was the fourth appearance of what would become standardised as the men's ISSF Olympic trap event. The event was held at every Summer Olympics from 1896 to 1924 (except 1904, when no shooting events were held) and from 1952 to 2016; it was open to women from 1968 to 1996.

None of the top shooters from the pre-war 1912 Games returned. The American team included Mark Arie, "one of the most colorful and popular shooters in American history."

No nations made their debut in the event. Great Britain made its fourth appearance, the only nation to have competed at each edition of the event to that point.

== Competition format ==
Shooter faced up to 100 clay pigeons over the course of four stages. The firing line was 15 metres away from the traps. Two shots were allowed per clay pigeon.

The first stage consisted of 35 targets. The top 50% of shooters advanced to the second stage. That stage had 35 targets again. The top 50% of shooters by combined score of the two stages advanced to the third stage (that is, 25% of the initial starters). The third stage had 20 targets. Each of the first three stages used a known-trap, unknown-angle format. The fourth stage had only 10 targets, with an unknown trap.

== Records ==
Prior to this competition, the existing world and Olympic records were as follows.

World record				
Olympic record	James Graham (USA)	96	Stockholm, Sweden	2–4 July 1912

No new world or Olympic records were set during the competition.

== Schedule ==
Date	Time	Round
Friday, 23 July 1920; Saturday, 24 July 1920	9:30	First stage Second stage Third stage Final stage

== Results ==
The maximum score was 100.

Rank	Shooter	Nation	Score
1st place, gold medalist(s)	Mark Arie	United States	95
2nd place, silver medalist(s)	Frank Troeh	United States	93
3rd place, bronze medalist(s)	Frank Wright	United States	87
4	Frederick Plum	United States	87
5	Horace Bonser	United States	87
6	Robert Montgomery	Canada	86
7	Nordal Lunde	Norway	85
7	Henri Quersin	Belgium	85
9	Albert Bosquet	Belgium	84
9	Émile Dupont	Belgium	84
11	William Hamilton	Canada	82
12	George Whitaker	Great Britain	79
—	George Beattie	Canada	73
—	Samuel Vance	Canada	71
—	John Black	Canada	52
—	Enoch Jenkins	Great Britain	unknown
—	Veli Nieminen	Finland	unknown
—	Christiaan Moltzer	Netherlands	unknown
