= Cornelis Viruly =

Dutch sports shooter

Personal information
- Born: 11 November 1875 Vuren, Netherlands
- Died: 23 September 1938 (aged 62) Amsterdam, Netherlands

Sport
- Sport: Sports shooting

Cornelis Marius Viruly (11 November 1875 – 23 September 1938) was a Dutch sport shooter who competed in the 1908 Summer Olympics.

He was born in Vuren and died in Amsterdam.

In 1908, he finished fourth with the Dutch team in the team trap shooting event. In the individual trap competition he finished 14th.
