= Eduardus van Voorst tot Voorst =

Dutch sport shooter

Personal information
- Born: 17 November 1874 Bagoe, Kraksaän, Probolinggo, Dutch East Indies
- Died: 2 April 1945 (aged 70) Warnsveld, Netherlands

Sport
- Sport: Sports shooting

Eduardus Ludovicus Baron van Voorst tot Voorst (17 November 1874 – 2 April 1945) was a Dutch sport shooter who competed at the 1908 Summer Olympics and the 1920 Summer Olympics.

He was born in Bagoe, Kraksaän, Probolinggo, Dutch East Indies and died in Warnsveld. He was the older brother of Franciscus van Voorst tot Voorst.

In 1908, he finished fourth with the Dutch team in the team trap shooting event. In the individual trap competition he finished 15th. Twelve years later, he finished sixth as a member of the Dutch team in the team clay pigeons event.
