= Frederick Plum =

American sports shooter

Personal information
- Born: June 25, 1887 Bellefontaine, Ohio, United States
- Died: November 16, 1932 (aged 45) Atlantic City, New Jersey, United States

Sport
- Sport: Sports shooting

Frederick Plum (June 25, 1887 – November 16, 1932) was an American sports shooter. He competed in the trap event at the 1920 Summer Olympics.
