= Karl Richter (sport shooter) =

Swedish sport shooter

Personal information
- Born: 14 December 1876 Stockholm, Sweden
- Died: 30 November 1959 (aged 82) Stockholm, Sweden

Sport
- Sport: Sports shooting
Medal record
Men's shooting
Representing Sweden
Olympic Games
Bronze medal – third place	1920 Antwerp	team clay pigeons

Karl Gustav Bernhardt Richter (14 December 1876 – 30 November 1959) was a Swedish sport shooter who competed in the 1920 Summer Olympics and in the 1924 Summer Olympics.

In 1920, he won the bronze medal as a member of the Swedish team in the team clay pigeons competition. He also participated in the individual trap event, but his result is unknown. Four years later, he finished fifth with the Swedish team in the team clay pigeons competition.
