= Rudolph van Pallandt =

Dutch sport shooter

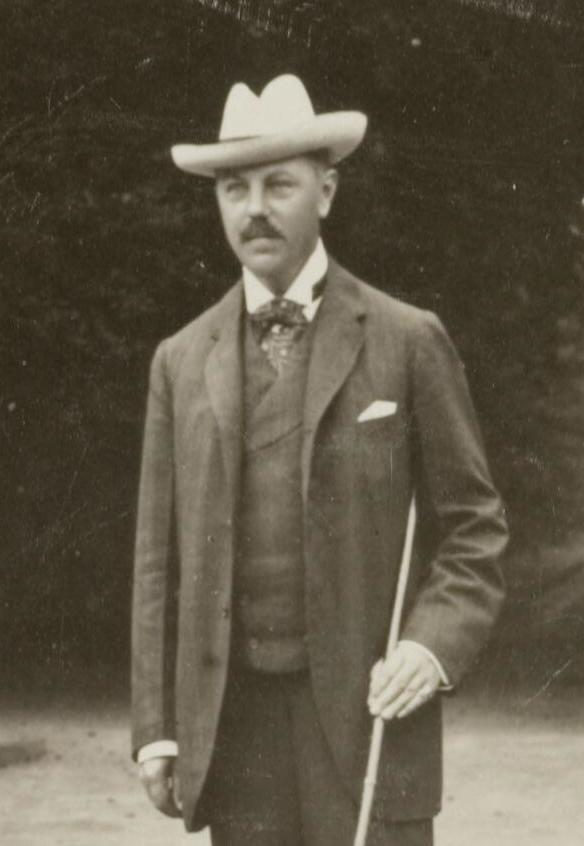

Personal information
- Born: 28 November 1868 Oldebroek, Gelderland, Netherlands
- Died: 15 March 1913 (aged 44) London, England

Sport
- Sport: Sports shooting, Cycling

Rudolph Theodorus Baron van Pallandt van Eerde (28 November 1868 – 15 March 1913) was a Dutch sportsman who competed as a sport shooter at the 1908 Summer Olympics. In his younger years he competed successfully as a racing cyclist.

== Biography ==
He was born in Oldebroek into an old noble Pallandt family. In 1908, he finished fourth with the Dutch team in the team trap shooting event. Rudolph van Pallandt died on 15 March 1913 in London, Great Britain, aged 54.
