= Walter W. Winans =

American sport shooter and artist

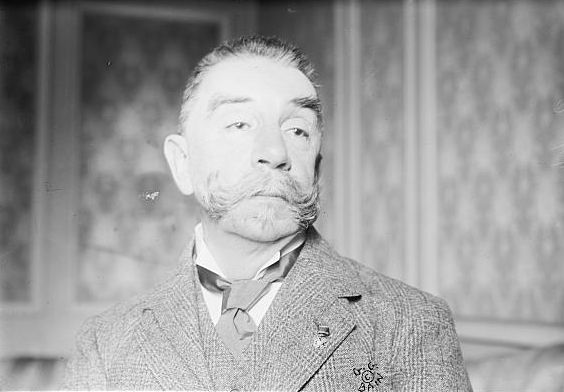
- Winans in 1910

Medal record

Representing United States

Olympic Games

Men's shooting
Gold medal – first place	1908 London	Double-shot running deer
Silver medal – second place	1912 Stockholm	100 m team running deer, single shots

Art competitions
Gold medal – first place	1912 Stockholm	Sculpture

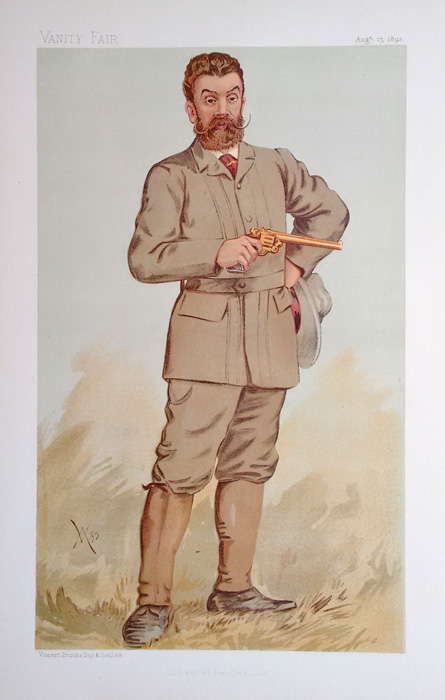
"The Record Revolver Shot". Caricature by Spy published in Vanity Fair in 1893.

Walter W. Winans (April 5, 1852 – August 12, 1920) was an American marksman, horse breeder, sculptor, and painter who participated in the 1908 and 1912 Summer Olympics. He won two medals for shooting: a gold in 1908 and a silver in 1912, as well as demonstrating the sport of pistol duelling in the 1908 Games. He also won a gold medal for his sculpture An American Trotter at Stockholm in 1912. In addition, Winans wrote ten books.

== Biography ==
Walter Winans was born to Americans William Louis Winans (1823-1897) and Maria Ann de la Rue on April 5, 1852, at the Nikolaevsky Railway Works at St. Petersburg, Russian Empire. His father had a contract to build the first major railroad in Russia, for the Tsar, who famously took a ruler, drew a straight line on the map and declared, "This is my line for the railroad. Build it that way!" William and his brother Thomas (Walter's uncle) succeeded at the cost of thousands of lives of Russian serfs, and he became extraordinarily wealthy. William never returned to the US and settled in England. Walter lived in St. Petersburg until the age of 18, taking the oath of allegiance at the US Embassy before leaving for Kent, England.

Walter and his brother Louis lived off their father's vast fortune while pursuing personal interests. Walter held hunting and shooting rights over nearly 250,000 acres (1,000 km^{2}) in Glen Strathfarrar, Glen Cannich and Glen Affric in the Highlands of Scotland. Walter and his brother Louis had "unenviable notoriety" in the English press for their large-scale deer hunts, noted for the "shameful" wholesale slaughter of deer, where they employed sixty "gillies" (attendants) during hunting season. In the 1901 edition of his book The Art of Revolver Shooting he favoured the Webley–Fosbery above other "automatic pistols," but it is not mentioned in the 1911 edition nor in the subsequent Automatic Pistol Shooting or The Modern Pistol and How to Shoot it.

In 1884 he prosecuted a Scotsman, Murdoch Macrae, for grazing a lamb on land owned by Winans. The failure of Winans' prosecution established the right to roam, which was a key element in opening British parklands to the public.

In 1910 he sent several horses to the National Horse Show in Madison Square Garden in New York City.

Winans range at the National Shooting Centre, Bisley, England is named after him.

Winans died in Parsloes Park, Dagenham, Essex, on August 12, 1920.

== Bibliography ==
- The Art of Revolver Shooting, New York: Knickerbocker Press, 1901 [Riling 1527]
- Hints on Revolver Shooting, New York: Putnam's, 1904 [Riling 1597]
- Practical Rifle Shooting, New York: Putnam's, 1906 [Riling 1630]
- The Sporting Rifle, New York: Putnam's, 1908 [Riling 1662]
- The Art of Revolver Shooting, Rev. Ed., New York: Knickerbocker Press, 1911 [Riling 1527 var.]
- Shooting for Ladies, New York: Putnam's, 1911 [Riling 1730]
- "Revolvers" – an article in Encyclopedia of Sports & Games in Four Volumes, Vol IV, published by The Sportsman (1912)
- Deer Breeding for Fine Heads (1913)
- Animal Sculpture (1914)
- Pistolen- und Revolverschiessen (1914) translation of The Art of Revolver Shooting, with amendments, by Dr. Maxim Goldberg
- Automatic Pistol Shooting, New York: Putnam's, 1915 [Riling 1806]
- The Modern Pistol & How to Shoot it, New York: Putnam's, 1919 [Riling 1884]
- How to Handle a Revolver London: Geo Newnes (pages 289 to 295 of CB Fry's Magazine Vol II 1904 to 1905)
- "Some Hints on Revolver Shooting in Competitions", an article in a book published in a "Book of Sports" (title to be confirmed) by Cassell's and Company of London in 1903 or 1904.
- How to Drive a Trotter, London: Geo Newnes (pp. 498–500 of CB Fry's Magazine Vol II 1904 to 1905)

== See also ==
- Art competitions at the Summer Olympics
- List of Olympic medalists in shooting
