= Per Kinde =

Swedish sport shooter

Personal information
- Full name: Per Johan Kinde
- Born: 14 April 1887 Gothenburg, Sweden
- Died: 1 July 1924 (aged 37) Gothenburg, Sweden

Sport
- Sport: Sports shooting
Medal record
Men's shooting
Representing Sweden
Olympic Games
Bronze medal – third place	1920 Antwerp	team clay pigeons

Per Johan Kinde (14 April 1887 – 1 July 1924) was a Swedish sport shooter who competed in the 1920 Summer Olympics. In 1920, he won the bronze medal as a member of the Swedish team in the team clay pigeons competition.

In the 1920 Summer Olympics, he also participated in the following events:

- Team running deer, single shots – fourth place
- Individual running deer, single shots – result unknown
- Individual trap – result unknown

Kinde died in 1924 at the age of 37. The manner of death was suicide.
