= Edward Benedicks =

Swedish sport shooter (1879–1960)

Personal information
- Born: 9 February 1879 Menton, France
- Died: 24 August 1960 (aged 81) Stockholm, Sweden

Sport
- Sport: Sports shooting
Medal record
Men's shooting
Representing Sweden
Olympic Games
Silver medal – second place	1912 Stockholm	Running deer
Silver medal – second place	1920 Antwerp	Running deer

Edward Benedicks (9 February 1879 – 24 August 1960) was a Swedish sport shooter who competed at the 1908, the 1912 and the 1920 Summer Olympics.

In 1908, he finished 27th in the individual trap event.

Four years later, he won the silver medal in the running deer double shots competition.

In the running deer, single shots event he finished 26th, and in the individual trap event he finished 38th.

In 1920, he won his second silver medal with the Swedish team in the running deer double shots competition. He also participated in the running deer, single shots event and in the running deer, double shots event but for both contests his results are unknown.
