= Erik Sökjer-Petersén =

Swedish sport shooter

Personal information
- Born: 4 December 1887 Hyby, Sweden
- Died: 17 April 1967 (aged 79) Åkarp, Sweden

Sport
- Sport: Sports shooting
Medal record
Men's shooting
Representing Sweden
Olympic Games
Bronze medal – third place	1920 Antwerp	team clay pigeons

Erik Sökjer-Petersén (4 December 1887 – 17 April 1967) was a Swedish sport shooter who competed in the 1912 Summer Olympics and in the 1920 Summer Olympics.

In 1912 he finished seventh in the individual running deer, double shots competition and eleventh in the individual running deer, single shots event. Eight years later, he won the bronze medal as a member of the Swedish team in the team clay pigeons competition. He also participated in the individual trap event but his result is unknown.
