= Anastasios Metaxas =

Greek architect and sport shooter

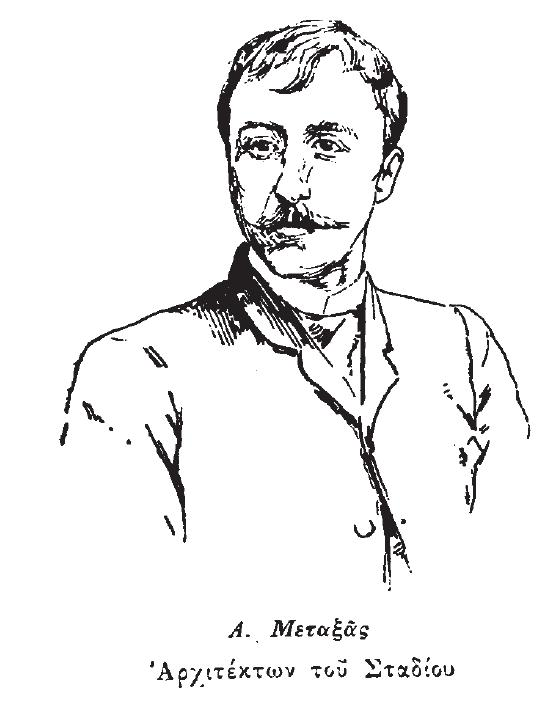

Personal information
- Born: 27 February 1862 Athens, Greece
- Died: 28 January 1937 (aged 74) Athens, Greece

Sport
- Sport: Sports shooting
Medal record
Men's shooting
Representing Greece
Olympic Games
Bronze medal – third place	1908 London	Trap, single shot
Intercalated Games
Silver medal – second place	1906 Athens	Trap, double shot

Anastasios Metaxas (Greek: Αναστάσιος Μεταξάς; 27 February 1862 – 28 January 1937) was a Greek architect and shooter.

== Biography ==
Metaxas was the royal architect of George I of Greece and is best known for being the architect chosen by George Averoff to restore the Panathinaiko Stadium for the 1896 Summer Olympics in Athens, the birth of the modern Olympic movement, while the design was from Ernst Ziller. He studied architecture at University of Dresden and passed with honours. He expanded or reformed many historic buildings including the Benaki Museum and the National Archaeological Museum, Athens. Other works of his include the design for St Andrew's Cathedral, Patras and various public buildings and mansions in Athens.

Metaxas was also a shooter and appeared in four Summer Olympics, winning two medals. He firstly competed in the 1896 Summer Olympics in the stadium he helped restore, he entered the 200 metre military rifle and the 300 metre free rifle, three positions and he would end up finishing in fourth place in both events.

Ten years later, Metaxas competed at the 1906 Intercalated Games, where he competed in nine events, with his best result being a silver medal in the Trap, double shot at 14 metres. Two years later Metaxas won a bronze medal in the trap shooting event at the 1908 Summer Olympics, held in London, tying for third place with British shooter Alexander Maunder, with 57 of 80 targets hit.

In 1912, aged 50, Metaxas made his final Olympic appearance at the 1912 Summer Olympics in Stockholm, Sweden, where he finished sixth in the trap competition and 35th in the 30 metre rapid fire pistol event.

Metaxas would later turn to politics as a member of the People's Party.

== Architectural works ==
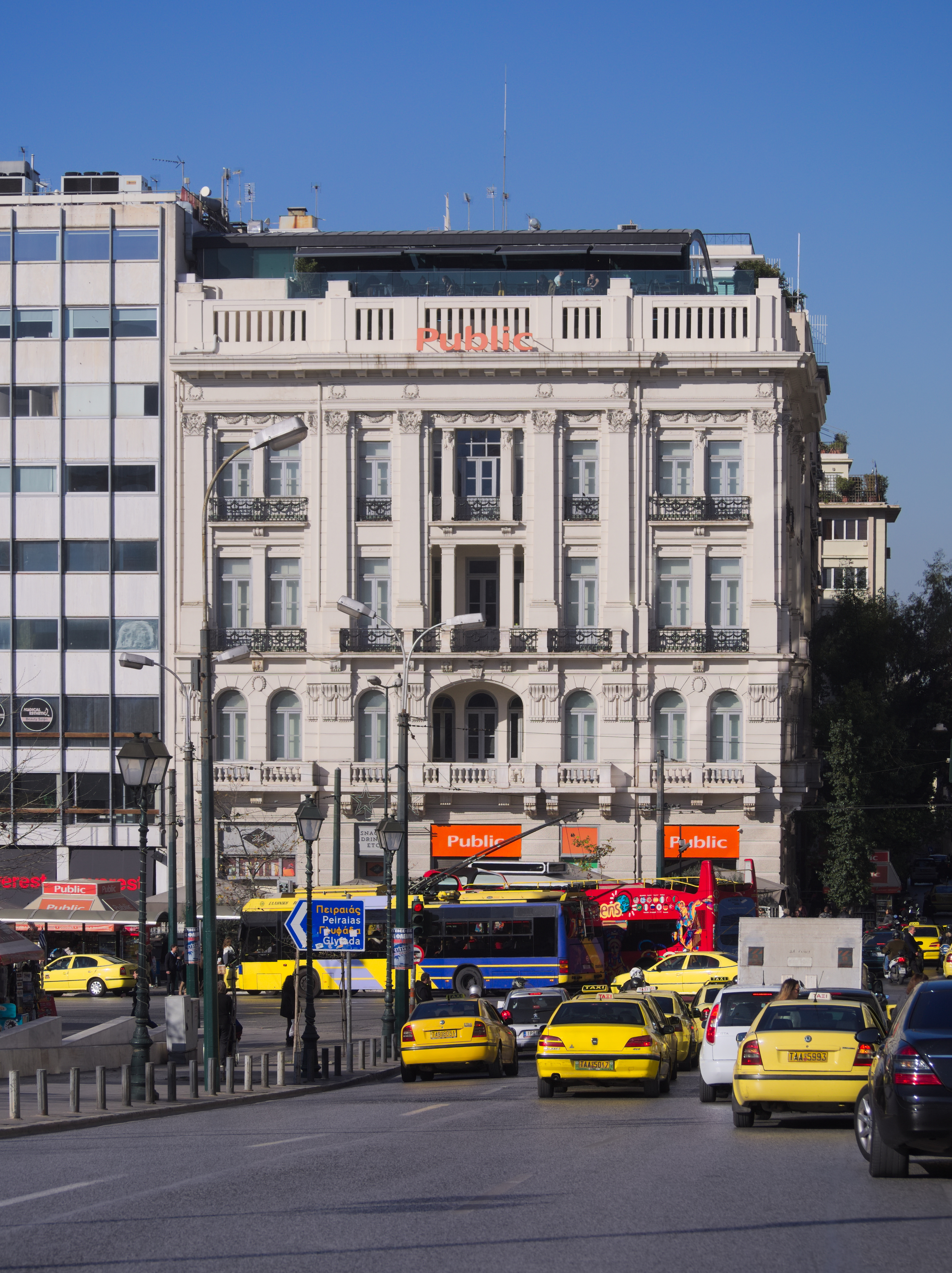
Pallis mansion, Syntagma Square

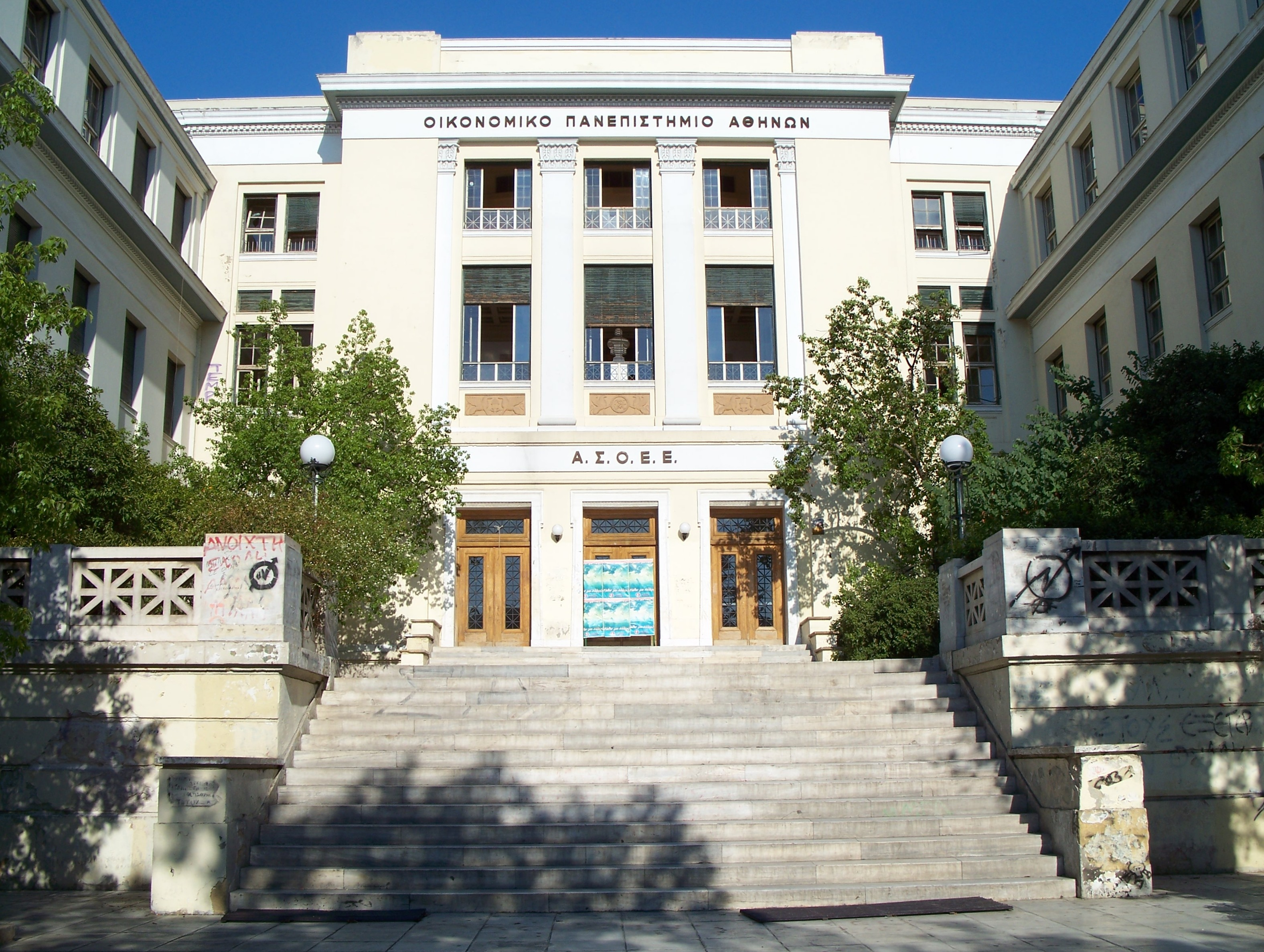
Main building of ASOEE

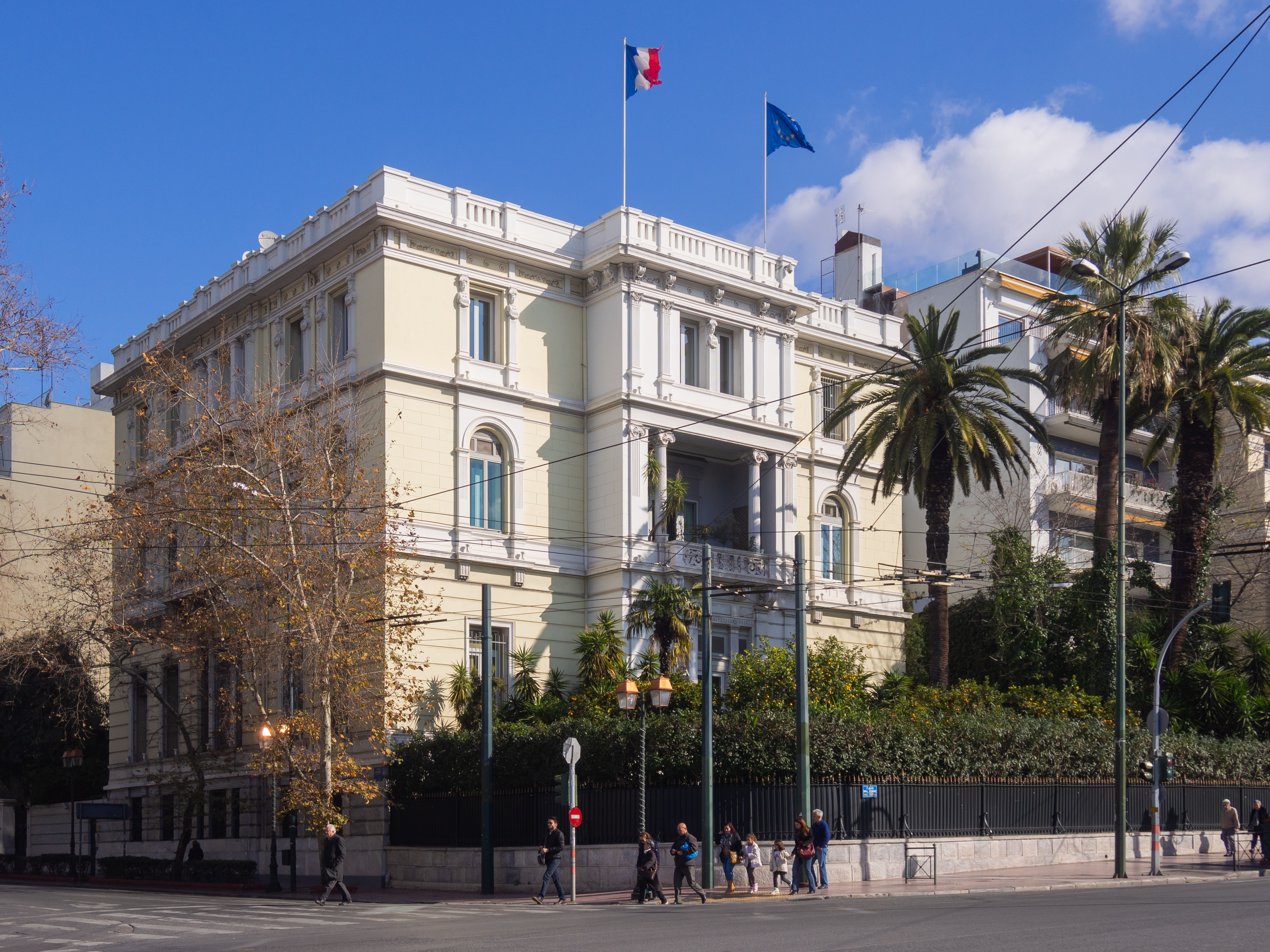
French embassy, Athens

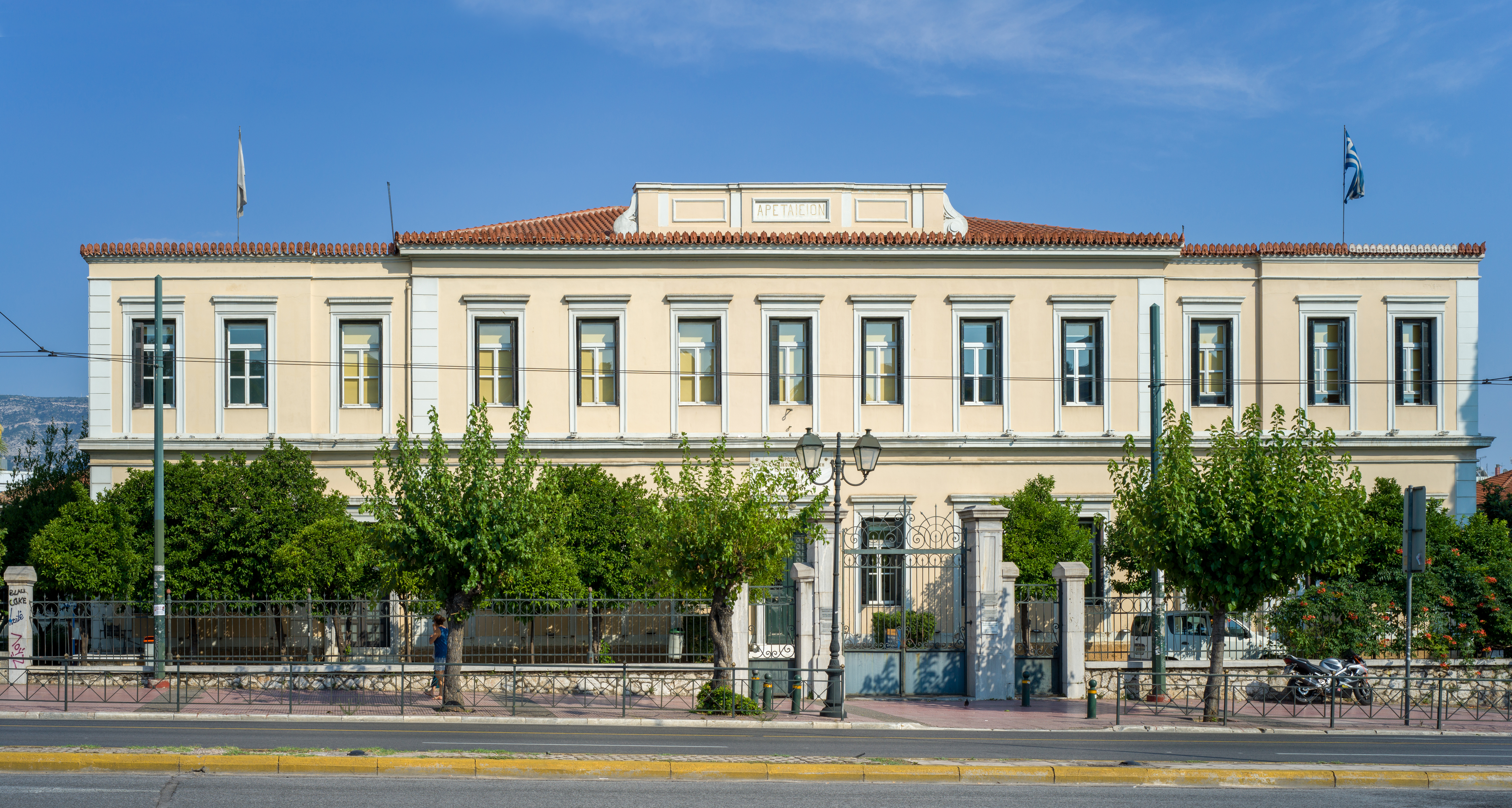
Aretaieion Hospital

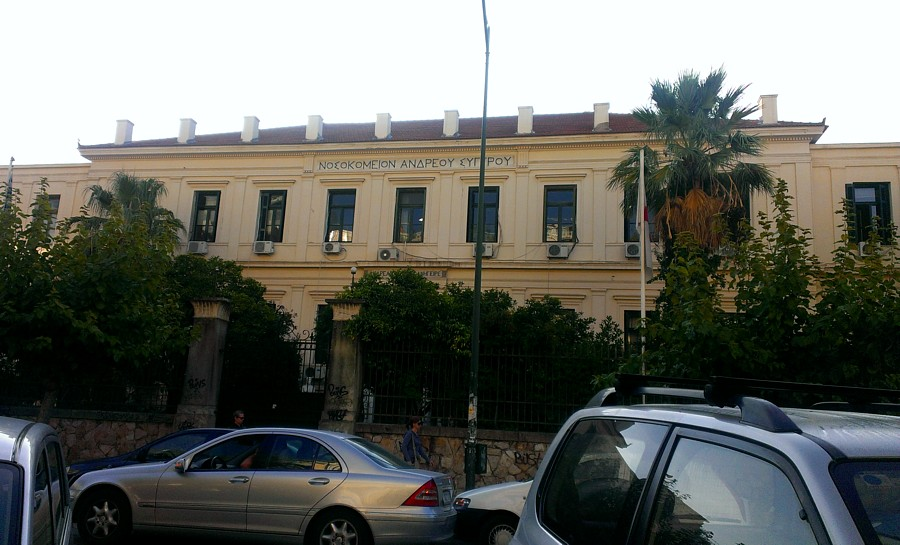
Syggros Hospital
