= Harold Hawkins (sport shooter) =

British sports shooter (1886–1917)

Personal information
- Nationality: English
- Born: Harold Ingleby Hawkins; 22 July 1886 Finchley, London, England
- Died: 16 June 1917 (aged 30) Arras, France

Sport
- Sport: Sports shooting
Medal record
Men's shooting
Representing United Kingdom
Olympic Games
Silver medal – second place	1908 London	Disappearing target

Harold Hawkins (22 July 1886 – 16 June 1917) was a British sports shooter. He competed in four events at the 1908 Summer Olympics winning a silver medal in the disappearing target event. He was killed in action during World War I.

== See also ==
- List of Olympians killed in World War I
