= Frank Troeh =

American sport shooter

Personal information
- Born: February 19, 1882 Sioux City, Iowa, United States
- Died: December 24, 1968 (aged 86) Portland, Oregon, United States

Sport
- Sport: Sports shooting
Medal record
Men's shooting
Representing United States
Olympic Games
Gold medal – first place	1920 Antwerp	Team clay pigeons
Silver medal – second place	1920 Antwerp	Trap

Frank Merlin Troeh (February 19, 1882 – December 24, 1968) was an Olympian who won a silver and a gold medal in trap shooting for the United States at the 1920 Summer Olympics in Antwerp, Belgium.

Troeh grew up in North Dakota. He moved to Washington, and later to Oregon, where he dominated the sport at all levels for more than 20 years. From 1913 through 1930, he was among the top 25 singles average leaders every year. In 1934, he won all four championship events at the Oregon State Shoot: singles, handicap, doubles, and all-around, the first time the feat had been accomplished. Troeh continued to compete and win well into the 1950s.

Troeh died in 1968 at the age of 86. He was inducted into the National Trapshooting Hall of Fame in 1970 and was an inaugural member of the Oregon Sports Hall of Fame in 1980. He was born in Sioux City, Iowa and died in Portland, Oregon.
