= Horace Bonser =

American sport shooter (1882–1934)

Personal information
- Born: March 27, 1882 Cincinnati, Ohio, United States
- Died: June 7, 1934 (aged 52) Cincinnati, Ohio, United States

Sport
- Sport: Sports shooting
Medal record
Men's shooting
Representing United States
Olympic Games
Gold medal – first place	1920 Antwerp	Team clay pigeons

Horace Robert Bonser (March 27, 1882 – June 7, 1934) was an American sport shooter who competed in the 1920 Summer Olympics.

In 1920, he won the gold medal as a member of the American team in the team clay pigeons competition. He also participated in the Individual trap and finished fifth. He was born, and later died in Cincinnati, Ohio.
