= James Gorman (sport shooter) =

American sport shooter

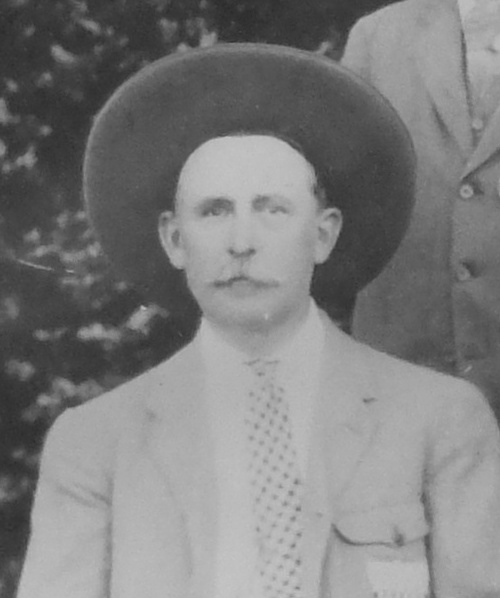

Personal information
- Born: January 30, 1859 Bilston, Staffordshire, England
- Died: November 2, 1929 (aged 70) San Francisco, California, U.S.

Sport
- Sport: Sports shooting
Medal record
Men's shooting
Representing United States
Olympic Games
| Gold medal – first place | 1908 London | Team pistol |
| Bronze medal – third place | 1908 London | Individual pistol |

James Edward Gorman (January 30, 1859 – November 2, 1929) was an American sport shooter who competed at the 1908 Summer Olympics. In the 1908 Olympics he won a gold medal in the team pistol event and a bronze medal in the individual pistol event.
