= Frans-Albert Schartau =

Swedish sport shooter

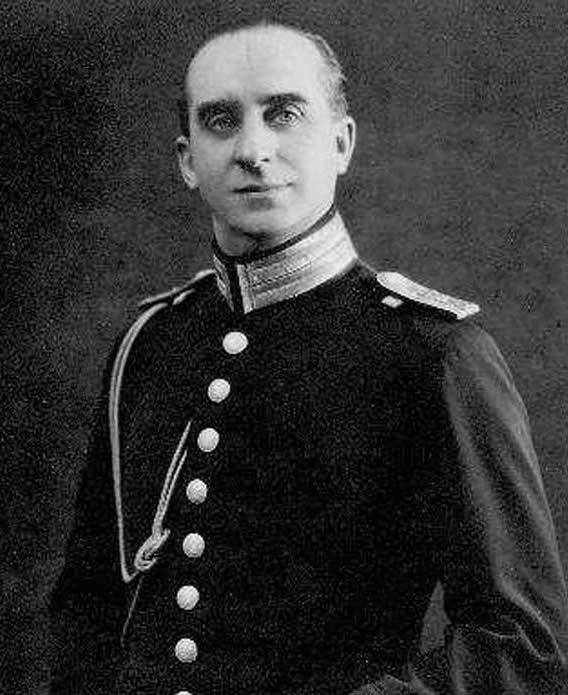

Personal information
- Born: 13 July 1877 Kristianstad, Sweden
- Died: 6 June 1943 (aged 65) Kävlinge, Sweden

Sport
- Sport: Sports shooting
Medal record
Representing Sweden
Olympic Games
Silver medal – second place	1908 London	Team small-bore rifle

Frans-Albert Vaksal Schartau (13 July 1877 – 6 June 1943) was a Swedish sport shooter who competed at the 1908 and the 1912 Summer Olympics.

In 1908, he was a member of the Swedish team that won the silver medal in the team small-bore rifle competition. He also took part in the following events:

- Team pistol – fifth place
- disappearing target small-bore rifle – ninth place
- moving target small-bore rifle – did not finish
- individual pistol – 18th place

In 1912 he finished 18th in the 30 metre rapid fire pistol event.
