= Frank Wright (sport shooter) =

American sport shooter

Personal information
- Born: December 26, 1878 South Wales, New York, United States
- Died: February 13, 1931 (aged 52) Buffalo, New York, United States

Sport
- Sport: Sports shooting
Medal record
Men's shooting
Representing the United States
Olympic Games
| Gold medal – first place | 1920 Antwerp | Team clay pigeons |
| Bronze medal – third place | 1920 Antwerp | Individual trap |

Frank Seymour Wright (December 26, 1878 – February 13, 1931) was an American sport shooter who competed in the 1920 Summer Olympics.

In 1920, he won the gold medal as a member of the American team in the team clay pigeons competition and the bronze medal in the individual trap event. He was born in South Wales, New York.
