= John Fleming (sport shooter) =

British sport shooter (1881–1965)

Personal information
- Born: 26 August 1881 Keswick, Cumbria, England
- Died: 9 January 1965 (aged 83) New Malden, London, England

Sport
- Sport: Sports shooting
Medal record
Men's shooting
Representing United Kingdom
Olympic Games
| Gold medal – first place | 1908 London | Moving target |

John Francis Fleming (26 August 1881 – 9 January 1965) was a British sport shooter who competed at the 1908 Summer Olympics.

In the 1908 Olympics, he won a gold medal in the moving target small-bore rifle event and was 9th in the disappearing target small-bore rifle event.
