= Edward Amoore =

British sport shooter (1877–1955)

Personal information
- Born: 20 March 1877 Wimbledon, London, England
- Died: 11 July 1955 (aged 78) Twickenham, London, England

Sport
- Sport: Sports shooting
Medal record
Men's shooting
Representing United Kingdom
Olympic Games
Gold medal – first place	1908 London	Team small-bore rifle
Bronze medal – third place	1908 London	Disappearing target

Edward John Amoore (20 March 1877 – 11 July 1955) was a British sport shooter and road cyclist who competed at the 1908 Summer Olympics as a shooter.

In 1903, he won the fastest time at the annual Anfield B.C. Invitational 100 mile time trial. In the 1908 Olympics he won a gold medal in the team small-bore rifle event, bronze in the disappearing target small-bore rifle event, was fifth in the stationary target small-bore rifle event and 19th in the moving target small-bore rifle event. He went on to serve in the First World War as an officer in the Honourable Artillery Company becoming its Adjutant.
