= George Herbert Skinner =

British sports shooter

George Skinner
Personal information
- Born: 1872
- Died: 29 December 1931 (aged 58–59)

Sport
- Sport: Sports shooting
Medal record
Men's shooting
Representing United Kingdom
Olympic Games
Bronze medal – third place	1908 London	Trap, team

George Herbert Skinner (1872–1931) was a British boot and shoe manufacturer, enthusiastic pioneer motorist and inventor of a well-known carburettor which remained in production almost the entire twentieth century until superseded by fuel injection systems.

== Biography ==
Herbert Skinner was born in 1872 in Wellingborough, the eldest son of boot and shoe manufacturer William Banks Skinner (1847–1914) and his wife born Jane Lilley. In 1881 Banks Skinner entered into a partnership with his brother-in-law, Thomas Lilley (1845–1916). They built a very successful footwear manufacturing and retailing business Lilley & Skinner.

The eldest son, Herbert Skinner, followed his father in the management of Lilley & Skinner. He brought back Britain's first modern shoe-making machinery from an 1895 visit to USA.

He acquired his first car in 1898 and actively participated in the development of the petrol engine. Herbert, with his brother Carl, Thomas Carlisle Skinner (1882–1958), made a newly developed carburettor in 1904. In February 1905, Herbert applied for a full patent which was granted in January 1906. The new carburettor was made for the Skinner brothers by G Wailes & Co of Euston Road until the brothers formed a limited liability company in August 1910 (Note: S. U. Company Limited, 386—388 Euston Road, N.W. Capital £5,000 in £1 shares. Formed to acquire from G. H. Skinner certain inventions relating to carburettors for motorcars &c New Companies Registered. Private Companies. The Automotor Journal, 24 September 1910) to manufacture it themselves. The original brand name Union Carburettor was changed to S. U. carburettor, an abbreviation of Skinner-Union. Younger brother, Carl (Thomas Carlisle) Skinner (1882–1958) sold out of Lilley & Skinner and took over the carburettor business. Herbert remained with Lilley and Skinner and continued to patent improvements to his carburettor.

He was one of the founders and the vice-president of the Institute of Patentees and well known in the City of London as an active member of the Cordwainers' Company. He represented England as a clay bird shot in the 1908 Summer Olympics and won a bronze medal.

Herbert was the father of Professor Herbert Skinner. He did not believe in early schooling. His son was nine years old before he entered Durston House School at Ealing.

Herbert Skinner died suddenly at his house in Woodville Road, Ealing, on 29 December 1931, aged 59.

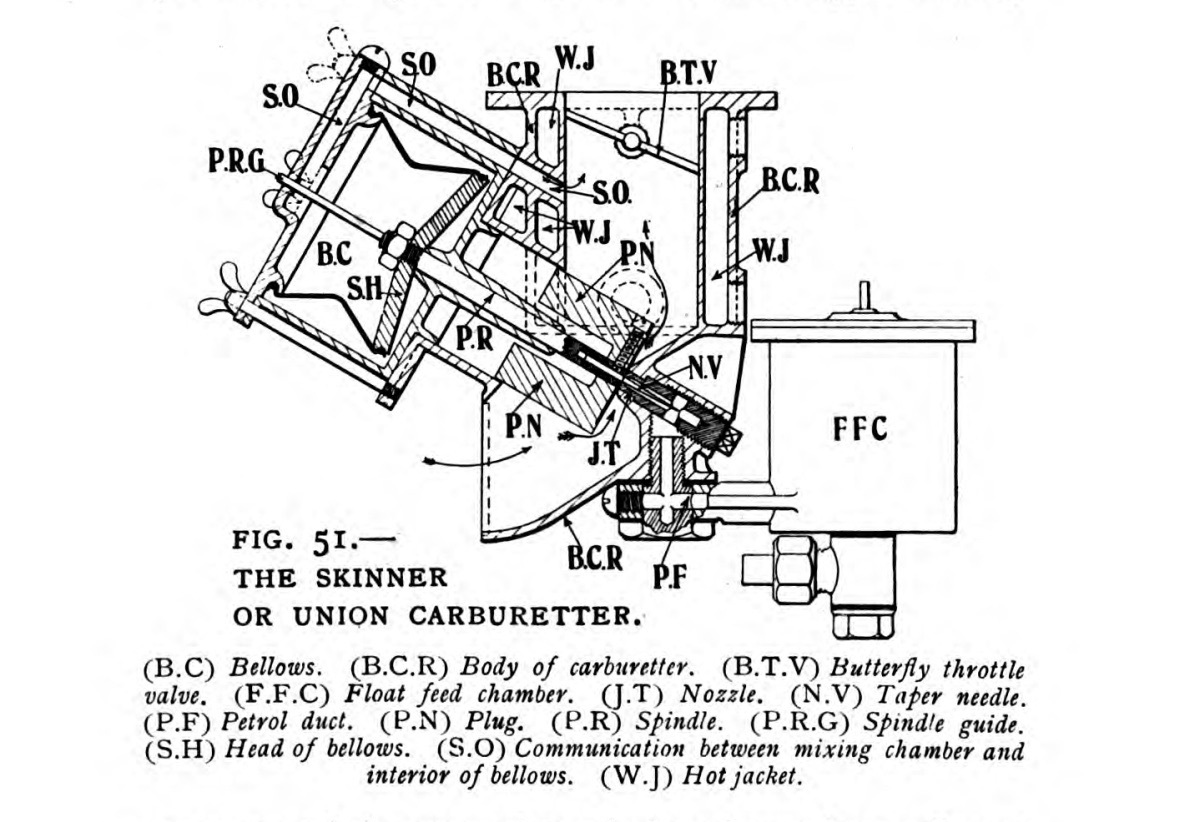
Diagram of original carburettor with leather bellows
