= Henry Creasey =

British sport shooter (1864–1923)

Personal information
- Full name: Henry Creasey
- Born: 1864 Hartley Wintney, Hampshire, England
- Died: 15 March 1923 (aged 58–59) Ealing, London, England

Sport
- Sport: Sports shooting
Medal record
Men's shooting
Representing United Kingdom
Olympic Games
Bronze medal – third place	1908 London	Team trap

Henry Parker Creasey (1864 – 15 March 1923) was a British sport shooter. He was born in Hartley Wintney, Hampshire. Competing for Great Britain, he won a bronze medal in team trap shooting at the 1908 Summer Olympics in London.
