= Uxendon Shooting School Club =

Sports venue in Preston, England

Coordinates: 51°34′21″N 0°17′8″W

The Uxendon Shooting School Club was a club devoted to shooting sports located in Preston, in what is now the borough of Brent in London, England. It was between the Wealdstone Brook and Barn Hill, roughly where Alverstone Road is now. It hosted the trap shooting events for the 1908 Summer Olympics.
