= Harold Humby =

British sport shooter (1879–1923)

Personal information
- Born: 8 April 1879 St. Pancras, London, England
- Died: 23 February 1923 (aged 43) Muswell Hill, London, England

Sport
- Sport: Sports shooting
Medal record
Men's shooting
Representing United Kingdom
Olympic Games
Gold medal – first place	1908 London	Team small-bore rifle
Silver medal – second place	1908 London	Stationary target
Silver medal – second place	1912 Stockholm	Team trap

Harold Robinson "Harry" Humby (8 April 1879 – 23 February 1923) was a British sport shooter, who competed at the 1908, 1912 and 1920 Summer Olympics.

In the 1908 Olympics, he won a gold medal in the team small-bore rifle event, a silver medal in the stationary target small-bore rifle event, and was eighth in the disappearing target small-bore rifle event. Four years later, he won a silver medal in the team clay pigeons event and was fourth in individual trap event.
