= George Beattie (shooter) =

Canadian sport shooter

Personal information
- Born: 28 May 1877 Montreal, Quebec, Canada
- Died: 6 April 1953 Hamilton, Ontario, Canada

Sport
- Sport: Sports shooting
Medal record
Men's shooting
Representing Canada
Olympic Games
Silver medal – second place	1908 London	Individual trap
Silver medal – second place	1908 London	Team trap
Silver medal – second place	1924 Paris	Team trap

George Beattie (28 May 1877 – 6 April 1953) was a Canadian sport shooter who competed in the 1908 Summer Olympics, 1920 Summer Olympics and 1924 Summer Olympics.

In the 1908 Olympics, he won a silver medal in the individual and team trap shooting events. Twelve years later, at the Antwerp Olympics, he was fifth in team trap event. He also participated in the individual trap competition, but his result is unknown. In 1924 at the Paris Olympics, he won a silver medal in the team trap event and was sixth in the individual trap event.
