= Réginald Storms =

Belgian sport shooter

Personal information
- Full name: Réginald Storms
- Born: 13 September 1880 Oorbeek B
- Died: 24 February 1948 (aged 67) Brussels

Sport
- Sport: Sports shooting
Medal record
Men's shooting
Representing Belgium
Olympic Games
Silver medal – second place	1908 London	50 y free pistol
Silver medal – second place	1908 London	Team 50 y free pistol

Réginald Storms (13 September 1880 – 24 February 1948) was a Belgian sport shooter who competed in the 1908 Summer Olympics.
