= Albert Bosquet =

Belgian sport shooter

Personal information
- Born: 13 June 1882 Brussels, Belgium
- Died: 24 May 1926 (aged 43) Brussels, Belgium

Sport
- Sport: Sports shooting
Medal record
Men's shooting
Representing Belgium
Olympic Games
Silver medal – second place	1920 Antwerp	Team clay pigeons

Albert Alexandre Philippe Bosquet (13 June 1882 - 24 May 1926) was a Belgian sport shooter. Competing for Belgium, he won a silver medal in team clay pigeons at the 1920 Summer Olympics in Antwerp.
