= Arthur Westover =

Canadian sport shooter

Personal information
- Born: 9 May 1864 Canada East
- Died: 14 August 1935 (aged 71) Quebec, Canada

Sport
- Sport: Sports shooting
Medal record
Men's shooting
Representing Canada
Olympic Games
Silver medal – second place	1908 London	Trap, team

Arthur W. Westover (9 May 1864 – 14 August 1935) was a Canadian sport shooter who competed at the 1908 Summer Olympics.

In the 1908 Olympics, he won the silver medal with the Canadian trap shooting team. He finished fifth in the individual trap shooting event.
