= Maurice Matthews =

British sport shooter (1880–1957)

Personal information
- Born: 21 June 1880 St. Pancras, London, England
- Died: 20 June 1957 (aged 76) Bournemouth, England

Sport
- Sport: Sports shooting
Medal record
Men's shooting
Representing United Kingdom
Olympic Games
Gold medal – first place	1908 London	Team small-bore rifle
Silver medal – second place	1908 London	Moving target

Colonel Maurice Kershaw Matthews OBE, TD, DL (21 June 1880 – 20 June 1957) was a British army officer, businessman, and local politician. He was also a sport shooter, who competed in the 1908 Summer Olympics.

In the 1908 Olympics, he won a gold medal in the team small-bore rifle event, silver in the moving target small-bore rifle event was fourth in the stationary target small-bore rifle event, and 9th in the disappearing target small-bore rifle event.

Matthews went into business as a valuer, rating assessor, and estate agent based in Tottenham Court Road.

He held a commission as an officer in the Territorial Force and later Territorial Army, reaching the rank of lieutenant-colonel in the 1st City of London Regiment. He was awarded the Territorial Decoration in 1930. He was subsequently granted the brevet rank of colonel in the Royal Fusiliers, retiring in 1940.

From 1931 to 1936, he sat on the London County Council, representing St Pancras South West as a member of the Conservative-backed Municipal Reform Party.

In 1935 he was appointed a Deputy Lieutenant of the County of London.

Matthews was sometime chairman and vice-president of the London Trustees Savings Bank, and in 1955 became vice-president of the Trustees Savings Banks Association. He was awarded the OBE in the 1953 New Year's Honours.

He died in Bournemouth in 1957, aged 77.
