= Henri Quersin =

Belgian sport shooter

Personal information
- Born: 26 June 1863 Esnes, France
- Died: 24 October 1944 (aged 81) Brussels, Belgium

Sport
- Sport: Sports shooting
Medal record
Men's shooting
Representing Belgium
Olympic Games
Silver medal – second place	1920 Antwerp	Team clay pigeons

Henri Louis Rémi Alexandre Théophile Quersin (26 June 1863 – 24 October 1944) was a Belgian sport shooter. Competing for Belgium, he won a silver medal in team clay pigeons at the 1920 Summer Olympics in Antwerp.
