= Arvid Knöppel (sport shooter) =

Swedish sport shooter

Personal information
- Nationality: Swedish
- Born: 7 March 1867 Stockholm, Sweden
- Died: 7 March 1925 (aged 58) Bad Nauheim, Hessen, Germany

Sport
- Country: Sweden
- Sport: Sports shooting
Medal record
Men's shooting
Representing Sweden
Olympic Games
Gold medal – first place	1908 London	Team running deer

Arvid Knöppel (7 March 1867 – 7 March 1925) was a Swedish sport shooter who competed at the 1908 Summer Olympics. In 1908, he won the gold medal in the team single-shot running deer event.
