= Walter Ewing =

Canadian sport shooter

Personal information
- Born: 11 February 1878 Montreal, Quebec, Canada
- Died: 25 June 1945 (aged 67) Montreal, Quebec, Canada

Sport
- Sport: Sports shooting
Medal record
Men's shooting
Representing Canada
Olympic Games
Gold medal – first place	1908 London	Individual trap shooting
Silver medal – second place	1908 London	Team trap shooting

Walter Henry Ewing (11 February 1878 – 25 June 1945) was a Canadian sport shooter who competed at the 1908 Summer Olympics. In the 1908 Olympics he won a gold medal in the individual trap shooting event and silver medal in team trap shooting event.
