= David McMackon =

Canadian sports shooter

Personal information
- Born: 19 March 1858 Markham, Canada West
- Died: 10 December 1922 (aged 64) Angus, Ontario, Canada

Sport
- Sport: Sports shooting
Medal record
Men's shooting
Representing Canada
Olympic Games
Silver medal – second place	1908 London	Trap, team

David McMackon (19 March 1858 – 10 December 1922) was a Canadian sports shooter. He competed at the 1908 Summer Olympics winning a silver medal in the team trap event.
