= Charles Palmer (sport shooter) =

English sport shooter (1869–1947)

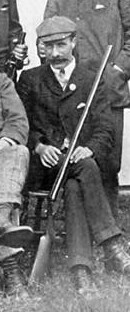

Personal information
- Born: 18 August 1869 Old Warden, Bedfordshire, England
- Died: 14 November 1947 (aged 78) Colwyn Bay, Wales

Sport
- Sport: Sports shooting
Medal record
Men's shooting
Representing United Kingdom
Olympic Games
Gold medal – first place	1908 London	Team trap shooting
Silver medal – second place	1912 Stockholm	Team trap

Charles Palmer (18 August 1869 – 14 November 1947) was an English sport shooter who competed at the 1908, 1912 and 1920 Summer Olympics for Great Britain.

In the 1908 Olympics, he won a gold medal in the team trap shooting event and was fifth in the individual trap shooting event. Four years later, he won a silver medal in the team clay pigeons event and was 21st in the trap event.
