= John Pike (sport shooter) =

British sport shooter (1861–1919)

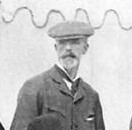

Personal information
- Full name: John Franklin Pike
- Born: 1861
- Died: 25 February 1919 (aged 57–58)

Sport
- Sport: Sports shooting
Medal record
Men's shooting
Representing United Kingdom
Olympic Games
Gold medal – first place	1908 London	Trap, team

John Franklin Pike (1861 – 25 February 1919) was a British sport shooter. Competing for Great Britain, he won a gold medal in team trap shooting at the 1908 Summer Olympics in London.
