= Percy Easte =

British sports shooter (1868–1930)

Personal information
- Full name: Percy Easte
- Born: 1868
- Died: 8 January 1930 (aged 61–62)

Sport
- Sport: Sports shooting
Medal record
Men's shooting
Representing United Kingdom
Olympic Games
Gold medal – first place	1908 London	Team trap

Percy Easte (1868 – 8 January 1930) was a British sport shooter. Competing for Great Britain, he earned a gold medal in the team trap shooting at the 1908 Summer Olympics in London.
