= William Morris (British sport shooter) =

British sport shooter

Personal information
- Full name: William Morris

Sport
- Sport: Sports shooting
Medal record
Men's shooting
Representing United Kingdom
Olympic Games
Bronze medal – third place	1908 London	Trap, team

William Morris was a British sports shooter. He competed at the 1908 Summer Olympics winning a bronze medal in the team trap event.
