= Mylie Fletcher =

Canadian sport shooter

Personal information
- Full name: Mylie Fletcher
- Born: 23 August 1868 Binbrook, Ontario
- Died: 25 October 1959 (aged 91) Hamilton, Ontario

Sport
- Sport: Sports shooting
Medal record
Men's shooting
Representing Canada
Olympic Games
Silver medal – second place	1908 London	Trap, team

Mylie Fletcher (23 August 1868 – 25 October 1959) was a Canadian sports shooter. Competing for Canada, he won a silver medal in team trap shooting at the 1908 Summer Olympics in London.
