= John Postans =

British sport shooter (1869–1958)

Personal information
- Born: 14 September 1869 Samford, Suffolk, England
- Died: 9 January 1958 (aged 88) Colchester, Essex, England

Sport
- Sport: Sports shooting
Medal record
Men's shooting
Representing United Kingdom
Olympic Games
Gold medal – first place	1908 London	team trap shooting

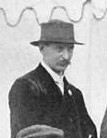
John Postans at the 1908 London Olympics

John Postans (14 September 1869 – 9 January 1958) was a British sport shooter. He was born in Suffolk. Competing for Great Britain, he won a gold medal in team trap shooting at the 1908 Summer Olympics in London.
