= George Vivian (sport shooter) =

Canadian sport shooter

Personal information
- Born: 4 October 1872 Sault Ste. Marie, Ontario, Canada
- Died: 6 October 1936 (aged 64) Toronto, Ontario, Canada

Sport
- Sport: Sports shooting
Medal record
Men's shooting
Representing Canada
Olympic Games
Silver medal – second place	1908 London	Team trap shooting

George Lane Vivian (4 October 1872 – 6 October 1936) was a Canadian sport shooter who competed at the 1908 Summer Olympics.

In the 1908 Olympics, he won a silver medal in the team trap shooting event and tied for 20th place in the individual trap shooting event.

Vivian died two days after his 64th birthday, in 1936. The manner of death was suicide.
