= John Butt (sport shooter) =

British sport shooter (1850–1939)

Personal information
- Full name: John Hurst Butt
- Born: 30 October 1850 South Witham, Lincolnshire, England
- Died: 1939 (aged 88–89) Surrey, England

Sport
- Sport: Sports shooting
Medal record
Men's shooting
Representing Great Britain
Olympic Games
Silver medal – second place	1912 Stockholm	Team trap
Bronze medal – third place	1908 London	Team trap shooting

John Hurst Butt (30 October 1850 – 1939) was a British sport shooter who competed at the 1908 Summer Olympics and the 1912 Summer Olympics.

In the 1908 Olympics, he won a bronze medal in the team trap shooting event and was 24th in the individual trap shooting event. Four years later, he won a silver medal in the team clay pigeons event and was 19th in the trap event.
