= Frederic Moore (sport shooter) =

British sport shooter

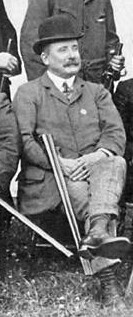

Personal information
- Full name: Frederic Moore
- Born: 23 August 1851
- Died: 2 May 1926 (aged 74)

Sport
- Sport: Sports shooting
Medal record
Men's shooting
Representing United Kingdom
Olympic Games
| Gold medal – first place | 1908 London | Trap, team |

Frederic Moore (23 August 1851 – 2 May 1926) was a British sport shooter. Competing for Great Britain, he won a gold medal in team trap shooting at the 1908 Summer Olympics in London.
