= Alexander Maunder =

British sports shooter

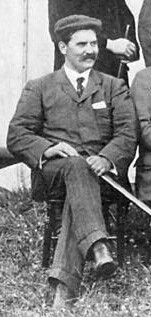
- Maunder in 1908

Personal information
- Born: 3 February 1861 Loxbeare, Devon, England
- Died: 2 February 1932 (aged 70) Bickleigh, Devon, England

Sport
- Sport: Sports shooting
Medal record
Men's shooting
Representing United Kingdom
Olympic Games
Gold medal – first place	1908 London	Team trap shooting
Silver medal – second place	1912 Stockholm	Team trap
Bronze medal – third place	1908 London	Individual trap

Alexander Elsdon Maunder (3 February 1861 – 2 February 1932) was a British sport shooter who competed at the 1908 Summer Olympics and the 1912 Summer Olympics.

In the 1908 Olympics, he won a gold medal in team trap shooting and a bronze medal in individual trap shooting. Four years later, he won a silver medal in the team clay pigeons event and was 45th in the trap event.
