= Bob Hutton =

British sport shooter (1872–1920)

Personal information
- Full name: Robert Hutton
- Born: 4 December 1872
- Died: 9 July 1920 (aged 47)

Sport
- Sport: Sports shooting
Medal record
Men's shooting
Representing United Kingdom
Olympic Games
Bronze medal – third place	1908 London	Trap, team

Robert Hutton (4 December 1872 – 9 July 1920) was a British sport shooter. Competing for Great Britain, he won a bronze medal in team trap shooting at the 1908 Summer Olympics in London.
