= George Whitaker (sport shooter) =

British sport shooter

Personal information
- Born: 25 August 1864 Walworth, London, England
- Died: 23 August 1937 (aged 72) Brighton and Hove, England

Sport
- Sport: Sports shooting
Medal record
Men's shooting
Representing United Kingdom
Olympic Games
Silver medal – second place	1912 Stockholm	Team trap
Bronze medal – third place	1908 London	Team trap shooting

George Whitaker (25 August 1864 – 23 August 1937) was a British sport shooter who competed at the 1908, 1912 and 1920 Summer Olympics.

At the 1908 Olympics, he won a bronze medal in the team trap shooting event and was 11th in the individual trap shooting event. Four years later, he won a silver medal in the team clay pigeons event and was 29th in the trap event.
