= Canada at the 1908 Summer Olympics =

- IOC code: CAN
- NOC: Canadian Olympic Committee

in London
- Competitors: 87 in 11 sports
- Flag bearer: Edward Archibald
- Medals Ranked 7th: Gold 3 Silver 3 Bronze 10 Total 16

Summer Olympics appearances (overview)
- 1900; 1904; 1908; 1912; 1920; 1924; 1928; 1932; 1936; 1948; 1952; 1956; 1960; 1964; 1968; 1972; 1976; 1980; 1984; 1988; 1992; 1996; 2000; 2004; 2008; 2012; 2016; 2020; 2024

Other related appearances
- 1906 Intercalated Games

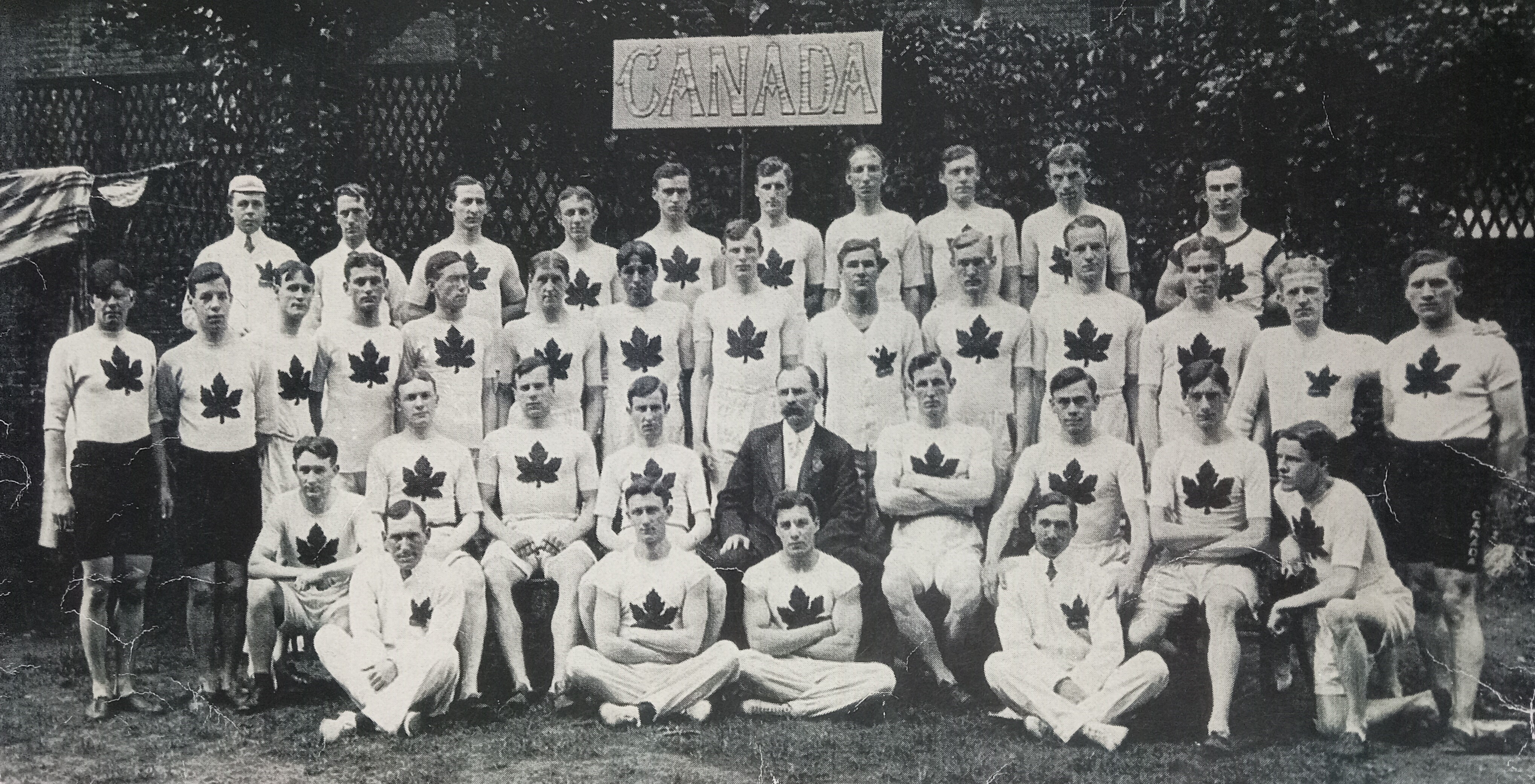
Canadian athletes at the 1908 Summer Olympics

Canada competed at the 1908 Summer Olympics in London, United Kingdom. Canadian athletes won three gold, three silver, and ten bronze medals.

== Team selection ==
The Canadian Olympic Committee was established to select athletes for the 1908 Summer Olympics, when the Canadian Amateur Athletic Union and the Amateur Athletic Federation of Canada had unsettled differences. YMCA executive J. Howard Crocker assisted the Canadian Amateur Athletic Union in arranging regional and national trials to select Olympic athletes. He was subsequently appointed manager of the national team for Canada in 1908, which was first national team organized despite that individuals had competed on behalf of Canada in prior Summer Olympics.

== Medallists ==
Medal	Name	Sport	Event	Date
Gold	Robert Kerr	Athletics	Men's 200 m	July 23
Gold	Canada national lacrosse team: Patrick Brennan; Jack Broderick; George Campbell; Gus Dillon; Frank Dixon; Richard Louis Duckett; J. Fyon; Tommy Gorman; Ernest Hamilton; Henry Hoobin; Albert Mara; Clarence McKerrow; David McLeod; George Rennie; Alexander Turnbull	Lacrosse		October 24
Gold	Walter Ewing	Shooting	Men's trap	July 11
Silver	Garfield MacDonald	Athletics	Men's triple jump	July 25
Silver	George Beattie	Shooting	Men's trap	July 11
Silver	George Beattie, Walter Ewing, Mylie Fletcher, David McMackon, George Vivian, Arthur Westover	Shooting	Men's trap, team	July 11
Bronze	Robert Kerr	Athletics	Men's 100 m	July 22
Bronze	Calvin Bricker	Athletics	Men's long jump	July 22
Bronze	Edward Archibald	Athletics	Men's pole vault	July 24
Bronze	Con Walsh	Athletics	Men's hammer throw	July 14
Bronze	William Anderson, Walter Andrews, Frederick McCarthy, William Morton	Cycling	Men's team pursuit	July 17
Bronze	Norway Jackes, Frederick Toms	Rowing	Men's coxless pair	July 31
Bronze	Gordon Balfour, Becher Gale, Charles Riddy, Geoffrey Taylor	Rowing	Men's coxless four	July 31
Bronze	Gordon Balfour, Becher Gale, Douglas Kertland, Walter Lewis, Charles Riddy, Irvine Robertson, Geoffrey Taylor, Julius Thomson, Joseph Wright	Rowing	Men's eight	July 31
Bronze	Charles Crowe, William Eastcott, S. Harry Kerr, Dugald McInnes, William Smith, Bertram Williams	Shooting	Men's military rifle, team	July 11
Bronze	Aubert Côté	Wrestling	Men's freestyle bantamweight	July 20

== Results by event ==
=== Athletics ===
==== Running ====
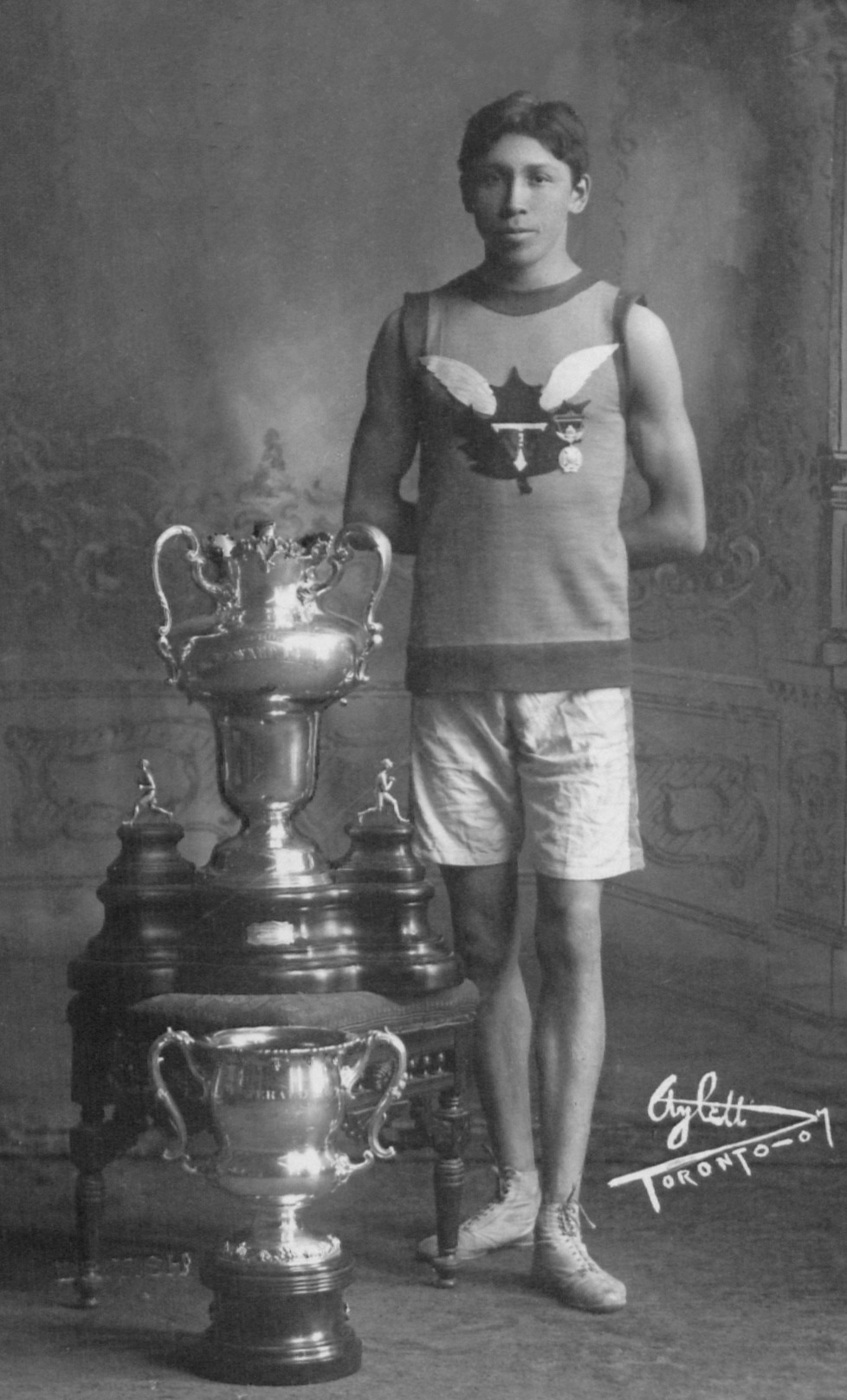
Tom Longboat

In response to Tom Longboat's poor performance in the marathon, J. Howard Crocker reported that Longboat was likely "doped", explaining his collapse and subsequent condition. This was subsequently probed by the Canadian Olympic Committee, with Crocker testifying.

Event	Place	Athlete	Heats	Semifinals	Final
Men's 100 metres	3rd	Robert Kerr	11.0 seconds 1st, heat 10	11.0 seconds 1st, semifinal 2	11.0 seconds
Men's 100 metres	Heats	Frank Lukeman	11.7 seconds 2nd, heat 13	did not advance	
Men's 100 metres	Heats	Louis Sebert	11.7 seconds 2nd, heat 14	did not advance	
Men's 100 metres	Heats	David Beland	unknown 3rd, heat 5	did not advance	
Men's 200 metres	1st	Robert Kerr	22.2 seconds 1st, heat 11	22.6 seconds 1st, semifinal 1	22.6 seconds
Men's 200 metres	Heats	Louis Sebert	unknown 2nd, heat 10	did not advance	
Men's 200 metres	Heats	Frank Lukeman	unknown 3rd, heat 3	did not advance	
Men's 400 metres	Semi- finalist	Louis Sebert	50.2 seconds 1st, heat 10	unknown 2nd, semifinal 4	did not advance
Men's 400 metres	Heats	Donald Buddo	unknown 2nd, heat 6	did not advance	
Men's 800 metres	Semi- finalist	Irving Parkes	none held	unknown 3rd, semifinal 2	did not advance
Men's 800 metres	Semi- finalist	Donald Buddo	none held	unknown 3rd, semifinal 5	did not advance
Men's 1500 metres	4th	John Tait	none held	4:12.2; 1st, semifinal 5	4:06.8
Men's 1500 metres	Semi- finalist	Frederick Meadows	none held	unknown 3rd, semifinal 1	did not advance
Men's 1500 metres	Semi- finalist	William Galbraith	none held	unknown 3rd, semifinal 7	did not advance
Men's 1500 metres	Semi- finalist	James Fitzgerald	none held	unknown 7th, semifinal 8	did not advance
Men's 110 metre hurdles	Heats	Ted Savage	unknown 3rd, heat 5	did not advance	
Men's 3200 metre steeplechase	6th	William Galbraith	none held	11:12.4; 1st, semifinal 3	unknown
Men's 3200 metre steeplechase	—	James Fitzgerald	none held	did not finish —, semifinal 6	did not advance
Men's medley relay	Semi- finalist	Frank Lukeman; Donald Buddo; Louis Sebert; Irving Parkes	none held	unknown 3rd, semifinal 3	did not advance
Men's 5 miles	6th	Frederick Meadows	none held	unknown 2nd, heat 4	unknown
Men's 5 miles	7th	James Fitzgerald	none held	unknown 2nd, heat 5	unknown
Men's 5 miles	11-12	William Galbraith	none held	unknown 2nd, heat 6	did not start
Men's 5 miles	—	John Tait	none held	did not finish —, heat 4	did not advance
Men's marathon	5th	William Wood	none held		3:01:44.0
Men's marathon	6th	Frederick Simpson	none held		3:04:28.2
Men's marathon	7th	Harry Lawson	none held		3:06:47.2
Men's marathon	11th	John Peter Caffery	none held		3:12:46.0
Men's marathon	16th	William Goldsboro	none held		3:20:07.0
Men's marathon	22nd	George Goulding	none held		3:33:26.0
Men's marathon	24th	Arthur Burn	none held		3:50:17.0
Men's marathon	27th	George Lister	none held		4:22:45.0
Men's marathon	—	Edward Cotter	none held		did not finish
Men's marathon	—	Tom Longboat	none held		did not finish
Men's marathon	—	Frederick Noseworthy	none held		did not finish
Men's marathon	—	John Tait	none held		did not finish
Men's 3500 metre walk	4th	George Goulding	none held	15:54.0; 1st, semifinal 3	15:49.8
Men's 10 mile walk	—	George Goulding	none held	did not finish —, semifinal 2	did not advance

==== Jumping ====
Event	Place	Athlete	Height/ Distance
Men's high jump	10th	George Barber	1.77 metres
Men's high jump	13th	Garfield MacDonald	1.72 metres
Men's long jump	3rd	Calvin Bricker	7.08 metres
Men's long jump	13th	Frank Lukeman	6.59 metres
Men's long jump	19th	George Barber	6.41 metres
Men's long jump	21-32	Garfield MacDonald	unknown
Men's triple jump	2nd	Garfield MacDonald	14.76 metres
Men's triple jump	4th	Calvin Bricker	14.10 metres
Men's pole vault	3rd	Edward Archibald	3.58 metres
Men's standing high jump	19-23	George Barber	unknown
Men's standing long jump	8-25	George Barber	unknown

==== Throwing ====
Event	Place	Athlete	Distance
Men's hammer throw	3rd	Con Walsh	48.51 metres

=== Cycling ===
Canada's best cycling result was a bronze medal won in the team pursuit.

Event	Place	Cyclist	Heats	Semifinals	Final
Men's 660 yards	Semi- finalist	Walter Andrews	55.8 seconds 1st, heat 8	unknown 4th, semifinal 1	did not advance
Men's 660 yards	Heats	Frederick McCarthy	unknown 2nd, heat 2	did not advance	
Men's 660 yards	Heats	William Morton	unknown 3rd, heat 14	did not advance	
Men's 5000 metres	Semi- finalist	Frederick McCarthy	none held	unknown 2nd, semifinal 2	did not advance
Men's 5000 metres	Semi- finalist	William Anderson	none held	unknown 3rd, semifinal 7	did not advance
Men's 5000 metres	Semi- finalist	William Morton	none held	unknown 5th, semifinal 3	did not advance
Men's 5000 metres	Semi- finalist	Walter Andrews	none held	unknown 5–6, semifinal 6	did not advance
Men's 20 kilometres	Semi- finalist	Harry Young	none held	33:45.2; 3rd, semifinal 3	did not advance
Men's 20 kilometres	Semi- finalist	William Anderson	none held	34:55.6; 3rd, semifinal 5	did not advance
Men's 20 kilometres	Semi- finalist	Frederick McCarthy	none held	unknown 6th, semifinal 1	did not advance
Men's 20 kilometres	Semi- finalist	Walter Andrews	none held	unknown 7–9, semifinal 2	did not advance
Men's 100 kilometres	6th	Walter Andrews	none held	unknown 5th, semifinal 2	unknown
Men's 100 kilometres	9-17	Harry Young	none held	unknown 7-9, semifinal 2	did not finish
Men's 100 kilometres	Semi- finalist	William Anderson	none held	unknown 7–14, semifinal 1	did not advance
Men's 100 kilometres	—	Frederick McCarthy	none held	did not finish —, semifinal 1	did not advance
Men's 100 kilometres	—	William Morton	none held	did not finish —, semifinal 2	did not advance
Men's sprint	Heats	William Morton	unknown 2nd, heat 9	did not advance	
Men's sprint	Heats	Frederick McCarthy	unknown 4th, heat 4	did not advance	
Men's tandem	Heats	Frederick McCarthy; William Morton	unknown 3rd, heat 7	did not advance	
Men's team pursuit	3rd	William Anderson; Walter Andrews; Frederick McCarthy; William Morton	walkover 1st, heat 2	2:29.2; 2nd, semifinal 1	did not advance

=== Diving ===
Event	Place	Diver	Preliminary groups	Semi- finals	Final
Men's 3 metre springboard	13th	Robert Zimmerman	74.00 points 3rd, group 1	did not advance	

=== Fencing ===
Canada's lone épéeist was eliminated in the first round

Event	Place	Fencer	First round	Second round	Semi- final	Final
Men's épée	First round	Percy Nobbs	2-6 (6th in I)	did not advance		

=== Gymnastics ===
Gymnast	Event	Score	Rank
Allan Keith	Men's all-around	170	59
Orville Elliott	Men's all-around	132.5	80

=== Lacrosse ===
Canada won the only lacrosse match played in 1908 against Great Britain, earning the gold medal.

Event	Place	Players	Final
Men's lacrosse	1st	Patrick Brennan, John Broderick, George "Doc" Campbell, Gus Dillon, Frank Dixon, Richard Louis Duckett, J. Fyon, Thomas Gorman, Ernest Hamilton, Henry Hoobin, A. Mara, Clarence McKerrow, D. McLeod, George Rennie, Alexander Turnbull	Won vs. Great Britain; 14–10

=== Rowing ===
Event	Place	Rowers	First round	Quarter- finals	Semi- finals	Final
Men's single sculls	5th	Walter Bowler	bye	unknown 2nd, quarterfinal 3	did not advance	
Men's single sculls	5th	Lewis Scholes	bye	unknown 2nd, quarterfinal 1	did not advance	
Men's coxless pair	3rd	Frederick Toms; Norway Jackes	none held		unknown 2nd, semifinal 1	did not advance
Men's coxless four	3rd	Gordon Balfour, Becher Gale, Charles Riddy, Geoffrey Taylor	none held		unknown 2nd, semifinal 1	did not advance
Men's eight	3rd	Irvine Robertson, Joseph Wright, Julius Thomson, Walter Lewis, Gordon Balfour, Becher Gale, Charles Riddy, Geoffrey Taylor, Douglas Kertland	none held	8.6; 1st, quarterfinal 1	unknown 2nd, semifinal 1	did not advance

=== Shooting ===
Event	Place	Shooter	Score
Men's 1000 yard free rifle	6th	S. Harry Kerr	91
Men's 1000 yard free rifle	9th	Charles Crowe	90
Men's 1000 yard free rifle	9th	Frank Utton	90
Men's 1000 yard free rifle	11th	Sydney Brown	89
Men's 1000 yard free rifle	16th	Dugald McInnis	87
Men's 1000 yard free rifle	19th	Frank Morris	86
Men's 1000 yard free rifle	27th	James Freeborn	83
Men's 1000 yard free rifle	28th	Fred Elmitt	82
Men's 1000 yard free rifle	28th	James Jones	82
Men's 1000 yard free rifle	33rd	Alexander Martin	79
Men's 1000 yard free rifle	35th	George Rowe	75
Men's 1000 yard free rifle	37th	James Steele	74
Men's team military rifle	3rd	William Smith; Charles Crowe; Bertram Williams; Dugald McInnis; William Eastcott; S. Harry Kerr	2439
Men's individual trap shooting	1st	Walter Ewing	72
Men's individual trap shooting	2nd	George Beattie	60
Men's individual trap shooting	5th	Arthur Westover	55
Men's individual trap shooting	7th	Mylie Fletcher	53
Men's individual trap shooting	12th	David McMackon	50
Men's individual trap shooting	20th	George Vivian	44
Men's individual trap shooting	27th	Frank Parker	19
Men's team trap shooting	2nd	George Beattie; Walter Ewing; Mylie Fletcher; David McMackon; George Vivian; Arthur Westover	405

=== Swimming ===
Event	Place	Swimmer	Heats	Semifinals	Final
Men's 100 metre freestyle	Heats	Robert Zimmerman	1:35.0; 2nd, heat 7	did not advance	
Men's 100 metre backstroke	Heats	Robert Zimmerman	unknown 3rd, heat 3	did not advance	

=== Tennis ===
Event	Place	Name	Round of 64	Round of 32	Round of 16	Quarter- finals	Semi- finals	Final
Men's singles	5th	Claude Russell-Brown	bye	bye	Defeated Slíva	lost to Richardson	did not advance	
Men's singles	9th	James Foulkes	bye	Defeated R. van Lennep	lost to Richardson	did not advance		
Men's singles	9th	Robert Powell	Defeated C. van Lennep	Defeated Žemla	lost to Caridia	did not advance		
Men's doubles	7th	James Foulkes; Robert Powell	none held	bye	lost to Crawley/K. Powell	did not advance		

Opponent nation	Wins	Losses	Percent
Bohemia	2	0	1.000
Great Britain	0	2	.000
Netherlands	2	0	1.000
South Africa	0	2	.000
Total	4	4	.500

=== Wrestling ===
Event	Place	Wrestler	Round of 16	Quarter- finals	Semi- finals	Final
Freestyle bantamweight	3rd	Aubert Côté	bye	Defeated; Davis	lost to Mehnert	Defeated; Tomkins

Opponent nation	Wins	Losses	Percent
Great Britain	2	0	1.000
United States	0	1	.000
Total	2	1	.667
