= Shooting at the 1908 Summer Olympics – Men's 1000 yard free rifle =

Sports shooting at the Olympics

Men's 1000 yard free rifle at the Games of the IV Olympiad
- Venue: Bisley rifle range
- Date: 9 July 1908
- Competitors: 50 from 8 nations

Medalists
1st place, gold medalist(s)		Joshua Millner	Great Britain
2nd place, silver medalist(s)		Kellogg Casey	United States
3rd place, bronze medalist(s)		Maurice Blood	Great Britain

The men's free rifle at 1000 yards was one of 15 events on the Shooting at the 1908 Summer Olympics programme. Each shooter fired 20 shots with a rifle at the target 1,000 yards away (914 m; 0.57 mile). A bulls-eye was worth 5 points, so the maximum possible score was 100. Each nation could enter up to 12 shooters.

== Results ==
Place	Shooter	Score
1	Joshua Millner (GBR)	98
2	Kellogg Casey (USA)	93
3	Maurice Blood (GBR)	92
4	Richard Barnett (GBR)	92
4	Ted Ranken (GBR)	92
6	Thomas Caldwell (GBR)	91
6	John Sellars (GBR)	91
6	Harry Kerr (CAN)	91
9	Charles Crowe (CAN)	90
9	Fred Utton (CAN)	90
11	Sydney Brown (CAN)	89
11	William Leushner (USA)	89
13	Charles Benedict (USA)	88
13	Ivan Eastman (USA)	88
13	Charles Jeffers (USA)	88
16	Thomas Fremantle (GBR)	87
16	Dugald McInnes (CAN)	87
16	Charles Winder (USA)	87
19	Raoul de Boigne (FRA)	86
19	Frank Morris (CAN)	86
19	Harry Simon (USA)	86
19	Percy Whitehead (GBR)	86
23	André Angelini (FRA)	85
24	Edward Green (USA)	84
24	John Hession (USA)	84
24	John Hopton (GBR)	84
27	James Freeborn (CAN)	83
28	Jørgen Bru (NOR)	82
28	Paul Colas (FRA)	82
28	Thomas Elmitt (CAN)	82
28	James Jones (CAN)	82
28	Alexander Rogers (GBR)	82
33	Alexander Martin (CAN)	79
34	Ossian Jörgensen (SWE)	77
35	Léon Hecht (FRA)	75
35	George Rowe (CAN)	75
37	James Steele (CAN)	74
38	Daniel Mérillon (FRA)	69
39	Léon Moreaux (FRA)	67
40	Georg Erdmann (NOR)	61
41	Asmund Enger (NOR)	58
41	Kolbjørn Kvam (NOR)	58
43	Erik Ohlsson (SWE)	54
44	Fredrik Mossberg (SWE)	48
45	Alexandros Theofilakis (GRE)	30
46	Ernst Rosell (SWE)	27
47	Mathias Glomnes (NOR)	26
48	Léon Tétart (FRA)	21
49	Ernst Wagner-Hohenlobbese (GER)	12
50	Olivius Skymoen (NOR)	DNF

== Sources ==
- Cook, Theodore Andrea (1908). The Fourth Olympiad, Being the Official Report. London: British Olympic Association.
- De Wael, Herman (2001). "Shooting 1908". Herman's Full Olympians.
