= Shooting at the 1908 Summer Olympics – Men's 50 yard pistol =

Olympic shooting event

Men's 50 yard pistol at the Games of the IV Olympiad
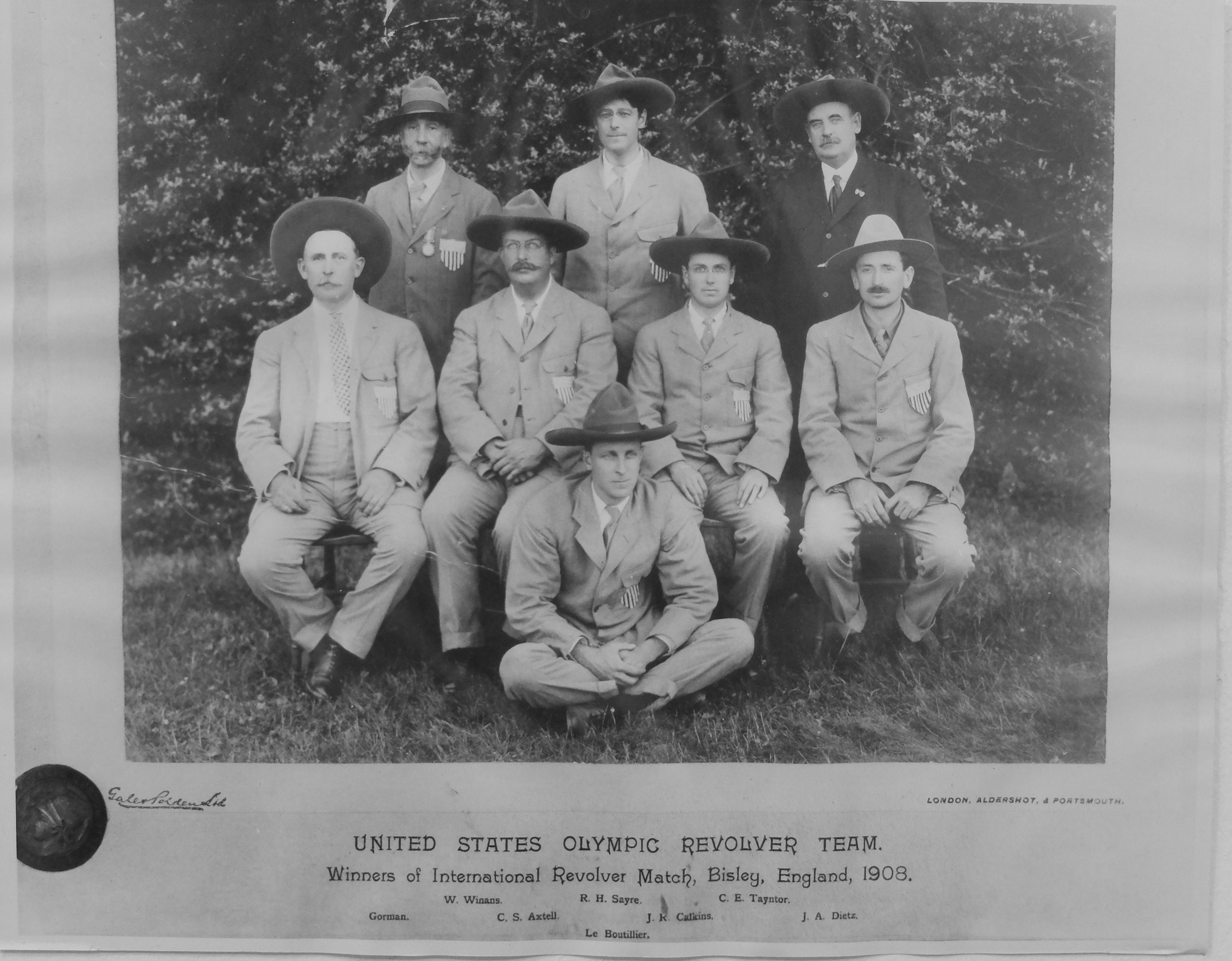
- United States team; bronze medalist Gorman seated at far left
- Venue: Bisley rifle range
- Date: 10 July 1908
- Competitors: 43 from 7 nations
- Winning score: 490

Medalists
1st place, gold medalist(s)		Paul Van Asbroeck; Belgium
2nd place, silver medalist(s)		Réginald Storms; Belgium
3rd place, bronze medalist(s)		James Gorman; United States

The men's individual revolver and pistol competition was one of 15 shooting sports events on the shooting at the 1908 Summer Olympics programme. The competition was held on Friday, 10 July 1908. Each nation could enter up to 12 shooters. Forty-three sport shooters from seven nations competed. Nations were limited to 12 shooters each. The event was won by Paul Van Asbroeck of Belgium, with his countryman Réginald Storms taking silver. They were the first medals for Belgian shooters in the free pistol. American James Gorman finished with the bronze medal after an unsuccessful protest, claiming he had put one bullet through a previous hole.

== Background ==
This was the third appearance of what would become standardised as the men's ISSF 50 meter pistol event. The event was held at every Summer Olympics from 1896 to 1920 (except 1904, when no shooting events were held) and from 1936 to 2016; it was open to women from 1968 to 1980. 1896 and 1908 were the only Games in which the distance was not 50 metres; the former used 30 metres and the latter 50 yards.

Great Britain and Sweden each made their debut in the event. Belgium, France, Greece, the Netherlands, and the United States each made their second appearance, tied for most of any nation.

Van Asbroeck used a Sauveur HS-6.

== Competition format ==
The competition had each shooter fire 60 shots, in 10 series of 6 shots each, at a distance of 50 yards. The target was round, 50 centimetres in diameter, with 10 scoring rings. Scoring for each shot was up to 10 points, in increments of 1 point. The maximum score possible was 600 points. Any revolver or pistol could be used; only open sights were allowed. Any ammunition with a metal cartridge case could be used.

== Records ==
Prior to this competition, the existing world and Olympic records were as follows.

World record				
Olympic record	Karl Röderer (SUI)	503	Paris, France	1 August 1900

== Schedule ==
Date	Time	Round
Friday, 10 July 1908		Final

== Results ==
Sixty shots were fired at a distance of 50 yards. Each hit counted between 1 and 10 points, for a total maximum score of 600.

Rank	Shooter	Nation	Score
1st place, gold medalist(s)	Paul Van Asbroeck	Belgium	490
2nd place, silver medalist(s)	Réginald Storms	Belgium	487
3rd place, bronze medalist(s)	James Gorman	United States	485
4	Charles Axtell	United States	480
5	Jesse Wallingford	Great Britain	467
6	André Barbillat	France	466
7	William Ellicott	Great Britain	458
8	Irving Calkins	United States	457
9	John Dietz	United States	455
10	André Regaud	France	451
11	Geoffrey Coles	Great Britain	449
12	Jacob van der Kop	Netherlands	447
13	Henry Lynch-Staunton	Great Britain	443
14	William Russell Lane-Joynt	Great Britain	442
15	René Englebert	Belgium	441
16	William Newton	Great Britain	440
17	Léon Moreaux	France	438
18	Franz-Albert Schartau	Sweden	436
19	Thomas LeBoutillier	United States	436
20	Vilhelm Carlberg	Sweden	432
21	Reginald Sayre	United States	430
22	Jean Depassio	France	427
23	Charles Wirgman	Great Britain	425
24	Piet ten Bruggen Cate	Netherlands	421
25	Frangiskos Mavrommatis	Greece	419
26	Alexandros Theofilakis	Greece	409
27	Johan Hübner von Holst	Sweden	408
28	Peter Jones	Great Britain	407
29	Ioannis Theofilakis	Greece	406
30	Léon Lécuyer	France	401
31	J. Nelson Fevre	Great Britain	399
32	Defkalion Rediadis	Greece	397
33	Eric Carlberg	Sweden	396
34	Maurice Robion du Pont	France	391
35	Otto von Rosen	Sweden	386
36	Jan de Blécourt	Netherlands	381
37	Jacques Pinchart	Belgium	372
38	Walter W. Winans	United States	368
39	Henry Munday	Great Britain	358
40	Gerard van den Bergh	Netherlands	343
41	Christiaan Brosch	Netherlands	337
42	John Bashford	Great Britain	329
43	Antonie de Gee	Netherlands	226

== Sources ==
- Cook, Theodore Andrea (1908). The Fourth Olympiad, Being the Official Report. London: British Olympic Association.
- De Wael, Herman (2001). "Shooting 1908". Herman's Full Olympians.
