= Shooting at the 1908 Summer Olympics – Men's double-shot running deer =

Sports shooting at the Olympics

Men's double-shot running deer at the Games of the IV Olympiad
- Venue: Bisley rifle range
- Dates: 9–10 July 1908
- Competitors: 15 from 4 nations

Medalists
1st place, gold medalist(s)		Walter Winans	United States
2nd place, silver medalist(s)		Ted Ranken	Great Britain
3rd place, bronze medalist(s)		Oscar Swahn	Sweden

The men's double-shot 100 meter running deer competition was one of 15 shooting sports events on the Shooting at the 1908 Summer Olympics programme. A deer-shaped target made 10 runs of 75 feet (23 meters), with the shooter firing two shots during each run. The runs lasted about 4 seconds each and took place 110 yards (100 meters) distant from the shooter. There were three concentric circles on the target, with the smallest counting for 4 points, the middle for 3, and the outermost for 2. A hit outside the circles but still on the target (except on the haunch) counted for 1 point. The maximum possible score was thus 80 points. Each nation could enter up to 12 shooters.

== Results ==
Place	Shooter	Score
1	Walter Winans (USA)	46
2	Ted Ranken (GBR)	46
3	Oscar Swahn (SWE)	38
4	Maurice Blood (GBR)	34
5	Albert Kempster (GBR)	34
6	William Ellicott (GBR)	33
6	Alexander Rogers (GBR)	33
8	Ernst Rosell (SWE)	27
9	John Bashford (GBR)	25
10	James Cowan (GBR)	24
11	Charles Nix (GBR)	22
12	Léon Tétart (FRA)	21
13	William Russell Lane-Joynt (GBR)	20
14	Maurice Robion du Pont (FRA)	18
15	Joshua Millner (GBR)	15

== Sources ==
- Cook, Theodore Andrea (1908). The Fourth Olympiad, Being the Official Report. London: British Olympic Association.
- De Wael, Herman (2001). "Shooting 1908". Herman's Full Olympians.
