= William Press =

William Press can refer to:

- William H. Press, American astrophysicist and computer scientist
- William Hans Press, American businessperson
- William J. Press, British wrestler who competed at the 1908 Summer Olympics
- Bill Press, American talk radio host
