= Oscar Swahn =

Swedish sport shooter

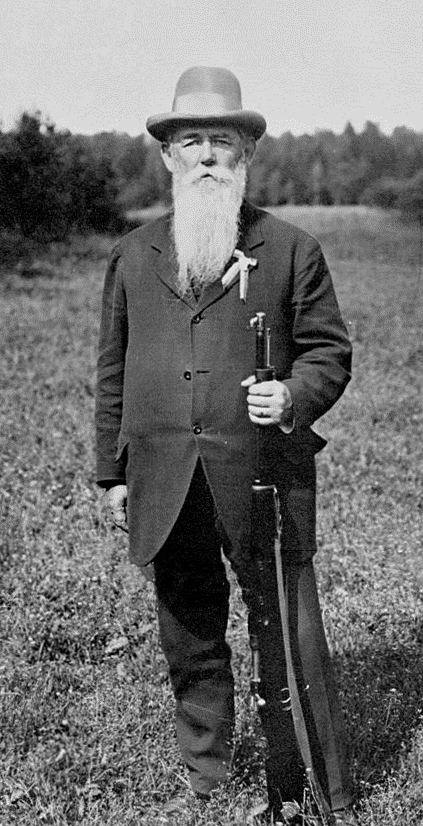
- Oscar Swahn at the 1912 Olympics

Personal information
- Nationality: Swedish
- Born: 20 October 1847 Götaland, Sweden
- Died: 1 May 1927 (aged 79) Stockholm, Sweden

Sport
- Country: Sweden
- Sport: Sports shooting
Medal record
Representing Sweden
Olympic Games
| Gold medal – first place | 1908 London | Single-shot running deer |
| Gold medal – first place | 1908 London | Team single-shot running deer |
| Gold medal – first place | 1912 Stockholm | 100 m team running deer, single shots |
| Silver medal – second place | 1920 Antwerp | 100 m team running deer, double shots |
| Bronze medal – third place | 1908 London | Double-shot running deer |
| Bronze medal – third place | 1912 Stockholm | 100 m running deer, double shots |

Oscar Gomer Swahn (20 October 1847 – 1 May 1927) was a Swedish shooter who competed at three Olympic games and won six medals, including three gold. Swahn holds records as the oldest Olympian at the time of competition, the oldest person to win gold, and the oldest athlete to win an Olympic medal.

== Biography ==
At the 1908 Summer Olympics, Oscar Swahn won two gold medals in the running deer, single shot events (individual and team), and a bronze medal in the running deer double shot individual event. He was 60 years old, a year younger than Joshua Millner, the oldest gold medallist at that time.

When the 1912 Summer Olympics came to his native country, Sweden, he was a member of the single shot running deer team which again won the gold medal. He also won bronze again at the individual double shot running deer event, but came joint fourth in the individual single shot event, which was won by his son Alfred Swahn. At 64 years and 258 days of age, he became the oldest gold medalist ever, a record he still holds.

At the 1920 Summer Olympics, he became the oldest athlete ever to compete in the Olympics at the age of 72. His best results were in the team competitions: a fourth place in the single shot running deer event, and a second place in the double shot running deer contest. With this silver medal, he is also the oldest medallist of all time (not counting the art competitions).

In all of the Swedish shooting teams competitions that Oscar Swahn competed with at the Olympic games of 1908, 1912, and 1920, he competed alongside his son, Alfred Swahn.
