= Francis Dixon =

Francis Dixon may refer to:

- Francis Dixon (cricketer) (1854–1943), English medical doctor and cricketer
- Francis Dixon (lacrosse), Canadian lacrosse player
- Francis Burdett Dixon (1836–1884), Australian trade unionist
- Francis Dixon, Sheriff of Cambridgeshire and Huntingdonshire 1757

== See also ==
- Frank Dixon (disambiguation)
