= Ernest Hamilton =

Ernest Hamilton can refer to:

- Lord Ernest Hamilton (1858–1939), soldier, MP and author
- Ernest Hamilton (lacrosse) (1883–1964), Canadian lacrosse player
