= Frederick Upton =

Fred or Frederick Upton may refer to:

- Frederick Upton (Whirlpool Corporation) (1890–1986), American corporate executive
- Fred Upton (born 1953), American politician; congressman from Michigan (grandson of above)

== See also ==
- George Upton, 3rd Viscount Templetown (1802–1890), Irish general and politician
- Fred Utton (1873–1939), Canadian sports shooter
