= Frank Dixon =

Frank Dixon may refer to:

- Frank Dixon (lacrosse) (1878–1932), Canadian lacrosse player
- Frank M. Dixon (1892–1965), Alabama politician
- Frank J. Dixon (1920–2008), scientist
- Franklin W. Dixon, pseudonym of the author of The Hardy Boys
- Frank Dixon (runner), winner of the mile at the 1943 USA Indoor Track and Field Championships

== See also ==
- Francis Dixon (disambiguation)
