= Wirgman =

Wirgman is a surname. Notable people with the surname include:

- Charles Wirgman (1832–1891), English artist and cartoonist
- Charles Wirgman (sport shooter) (1875–1953), British sports shooter
- George Wirgman Hemming (1821–1905), English law reporter and barrister
- Theodore Blake Wirgman (1848–1925), English painter

See also

- Wirgman Building, was an early 19th-century Federal-style commercial and residential building located on East Main Street (U.S. Route 50) in Romney
