= Creedmoor Rifle Range =

Former shooting venue in Long Island, New York

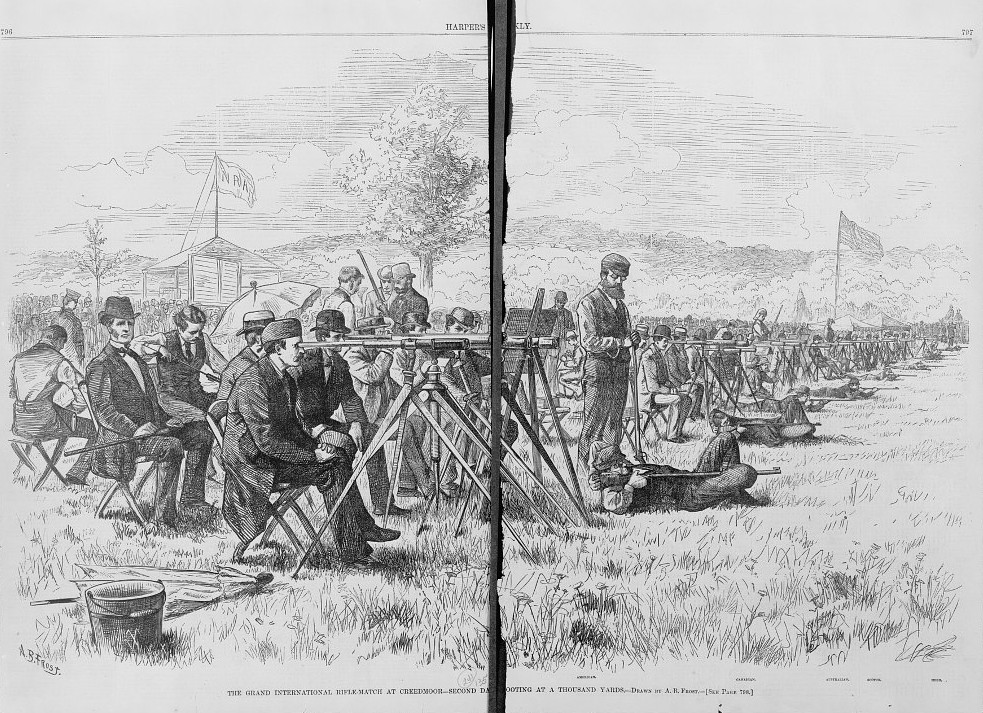
- The grand international rifle-match at Creedmoor - second day shooting at a thousand yards / drawn by A.B Frost
- Interactive map of Creedmoor Rifle Range
- Location: Long Island, New York
- Coordinates: 40°44′29″N 73°43′54″W
- Type: Rifle range
- Acreage: 70

Construction
- Built: 1872
- Opened: 21 June 1873

Creedmoor Rifle Range was sited on Long Island in what is now Queens Village, Queens, New York.

== History ==
The range was established after the New York Legislature and the newly formed National Rifle Association of America (NRA) collaborated in 1872 to acquire 70 acres of farmland from Bernardus Hendrickson Creed (1811–1889) for long-distance rifle shooting and the holding of shooting competitions. John B. Woodward, a founder of the NRA and New York Militia officer who had long advocated for improved soldier marksmanship, helped oversee the design and construction.

The range officially opened on June 21, 1873. The Central Railroad of Long Island established a railway station nearby, with trains running from Hunter's Point, with connecting boat service to 34th Street and the East River, allowing access from New York City.

In 1873, the NRA and the Creedmoor range benefitted greatly from the substantial publicity created when the Irish Rifle team, in that year the British champions having won the Elcho Shield, challenged the 'Riflemen of America' to a match at Creedmoor the following year. The Amateur Club accepted the challenge and won by a small margin.

In 1874, the Leech Cup was presented to the Amateur Rifle Club by Major Arthur Blennerhassett Leech, Captain of the visiting Irish Rifle Team and is thus the oldest trophy offered today in competitive target shooting in the United States. It was presented to the NRA in 1901 and was then annually awarded for long distance shooting by any rifle.

In 1875, the Wimbledon Cup was presented to the NRA by the British team on the occasion of the Americans shooting at Wimbledon, then the home of British rifle shooting. It was then annually awarded for 1000-yard shooting.

International competitions, organized by the NRA, were held annually at the range until 1891, after which a decline in interest and support caused them to be moved to the range at the National Guard Camp, Sea Girt, New Jersey under the auspices of the New Jersey State Rifle Association. The Creedmoor site reverted to the State of New York in 1907 and in 1912 became the Farm Colony of Brooklyn State Hospital. Today it is the site of the Creedmoor Psychiatric Center.

== See also ==
- Von Kameke, George (1877). "Creedmoor Grand March". Op. 19. Brooklyn: George von Kameke – via Google Books (University of Michigan) → Dedicated to Major General Thomas Spencer. Dakin (1831–1878), 2nd Division, NGSNY. OCLC 1029112286 (all editions).

== Bibliography ==
=== General ===
- "Queens Farm Park". New York City Department of Parks & Recreation.
- The National Rifle Association Annual Report, 1873. Henry K. Van Siclen (publisher) (Henry Kerr Van Siclen; 1842–1909). 1874 – via Google Books (NYPL). LCCN ca05001660; OCLC 993948300, 886934216.
