= Aubert Côté =

Canadian wrestler

Personal information
- Born: March 22, 1880 Montreal, Quebec, Canada
- Died: March 27, 1938 (aged 58) Provo, Utah, U.S.
Medal record
Men's freestyle wrestling
Representing Canada
Olympic Games
Bronze medal – third place	1908 London	Bantamweight

Aubert Côté (March 22, 1880 – March 27, 1938) was a Canadian wrestler who competed in the 1908 Summer Olympics. He was born in Montreal in 1880. In 1908, he won the bronze medal in the freestyle bantamweight category. He earned Canada's first Olympic medal in wrestling. He defeated Frank Davis of Great Britain in the first round and eventually lost to gold medalist George Mehnert from the United States. After that, he went on to beat Frederick Tomkins from Great Britain, earning the bronze medal.

== After the Olympics ==
He later moved to Montana in the United States. After this, he moved again to Utah, where he settled down and worked as a wrestling coach at Brigham Young University in Provo, Utah until his death in March 1938.
