= Charles Winder =

American sport shooter

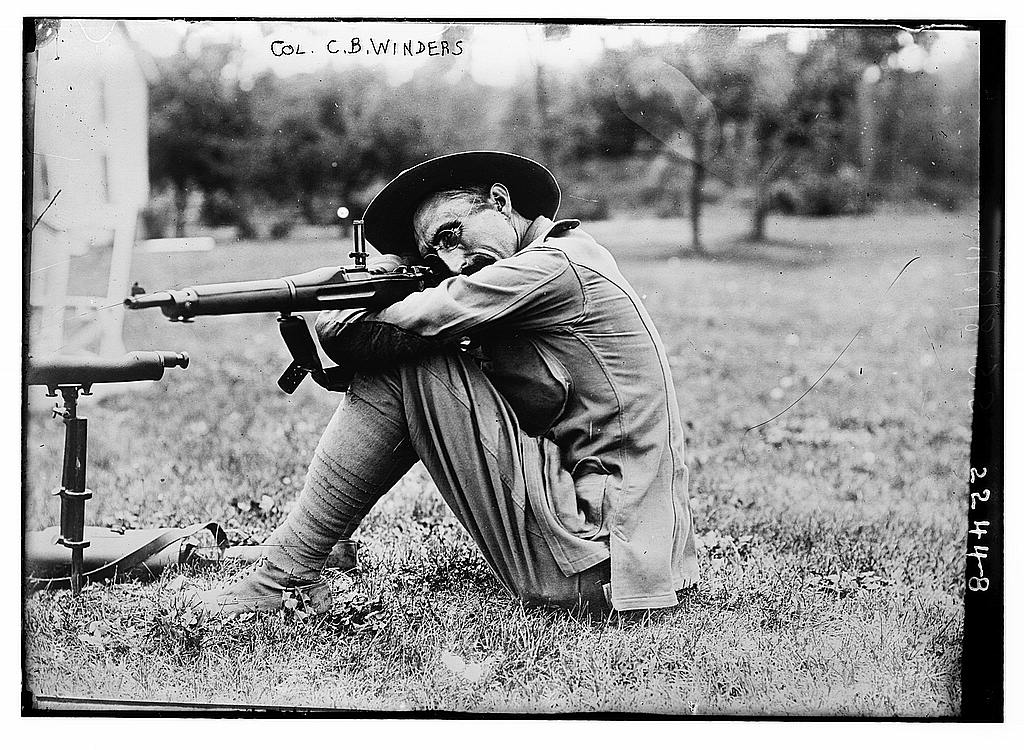
- Winder in 1911

Personal information
- Born: June 23, 1874 Champaign County, Ohio, United States
- Died: March 5, 1921 (aged 46) West Palm Beach, Florida, United States

Sport
- Sport: Sports shooting
Medal record
Men's shooting
Representing the United States
Olympic Games
Gold medal – first place	1908 London	Military rifle, team

Charles Blish Winder, Jr. (June 23, 1874 – March 5, 1921) was an American sport shooter, who competed in the 1908 Summer Olympics. He was a colonel in the Ohio Army National Guard.

== Biography ==
He was born in Wayne Township, Champaign County, Ohio on June 23, 1874.

He was the winner of the Leech Cup in 1903 in Sea Girt, New Jersey.

In the 1908 Olympics, he won a gold medal in the team military rifle event and was 16th in 1000 yard free rifle event.

He died in West Palm Beach, Florida on March 5, 1921.
