= Wimbledon Cup =

Rifle marksmanship trophy

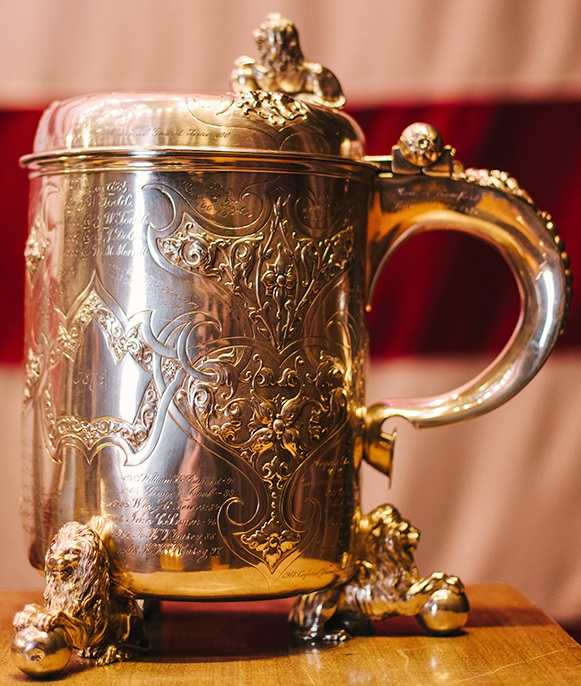
- The Wimbledon Cup for rifle shooting marksmanship
- Sport: Fullbore target rifle
- Competition: National Rifle & Pistol Matches
- Awarded for: Winner of the 1000 yard match
- Location: Camp Perry
- Country: United States of America
- Presented by: National Rifle Association of America

History
- First award: 1875
- First winner: Major Henry Fulton (USA)
- Most wins: Michelle Gallagher (USA):5 times
- Most recent: Larry Sollars (USA)

The Wimbledon Cup is a marksmanship trophy that was established in the 1870s.

It is awarded annually during the National Rifle & Pistol Matches which are held at Camp Perry, Ohio, and has become the most prestigious prize in US long-range rifle shooting.

Each year the high-power phase of these matches traditionally takes place during the first two weeks of August. The Wimbledon Cup is awarded to the winner of a 1000-yard shooting match — In which the rules permit use of "any sight", including telescopes.

Concurrent with the Wimbledon, service rifle shooters compete for the Farr Trophy, and Palma rifle shooters vie for the "Doc" Aiken Trophy.

== History ==
The Wimbledon Cup is a silver tankard wrought by British silversmiths of the Victorian period.

The British National Rifle Association inaugurated the prize in 1866. The Illustrated London News reported on July 26, 1866, that the Wimbledon Cup was a new prize for the Wimbledon Rifle Meeting of that year.

In 1875, the trophy was presented to the American rifle team attending the British matches at Wimbledon by Princess Louise, on behalf of the riflemen of Great Britain. Members of the American team competed among themselves for the trophy at Wimbledon; this match was won by Major Henry Fulton. The Wimbledon Cup was taken to the United States and placed in annual competition at Creedmoor Rifle Range as the trophy for a long range match open to any rifle. Michelle Gallagher has won the most cups with five. Her family have won it seven times. Her mother Nancy H. Tompkins-Gallagher won once and her step-father Middleton W. Tompkins won once.

The 1965 trophy was awarded to CPL Carlos N. Hathcock, USMC.
