= Shooting at the 1908 Summer Olympics – Men's team single-shot running deer =

Sports shooting at the Olympics

Men's team single-shot running deer at the Games of the IV Olympiad
- Venue: Bisley rifle range
- Date: 10 July 1908
- Competitors: 8 from 2 nations

Medalists
1st place, gold medalist(s)		Arvid Knöppel, Ernst Rosell, Alfred Swahn, Oscar Swahn; Sweden
2nd place, silver medalist(s)		William Ellicott, William Russell Lane-Joynt, Charles Nix, Ted Ranken; Great Britain

The men's team single-shot 100 meter running deer competition was one of 15 shooting sports events on the Shooting at the 1908 Summer Olympics programme. Teams consisted of four shooters. A deer-shaped target made 10 runs of 75 feet (23 meters), with the shooter firing one shot during each run. The runs lasted about 4 seconds each and took place 110 yards (100 meters) distant from the shooter. There were three concentric circles on the target, with the smallest counting for 4 points, the middle for 3, and the outermost for 2. A hit outside the circles but still on the target (except on the haunch) counted for 1 point. The maximum possible score was thus 40 points per shooter, or 160 for the team.

Only 2 teams competed.

== Results ==
Place	Nation	Shooter	Score
1	Sweden	Team total	86
1	Sweden	Alfred Swahn	26
1	Sweden	Arvid Knöppel	22
1	Sweden	Oscar Swahn	21
1	Sweden	Ernst Rosell	17
2	Great Britain	Team total	85
2	Great Britain	Charles Nix	27
2	Great Britain	William Russell Lane-Joynt	22
2	Great Britain	William Ellicott	18
2	Great Britain	Ted Ranken	18

== Sources ==
- Cook, Theodore Andrea (1908). The Fourth Olympiad, Being the Official Report. London: British Olympic Association.
- De Wael, Herman (2001). "Shooting 1908". Herman's Full Olympians.
