= Thomas LeBoutillier =

American sports shooter (1879–1929)

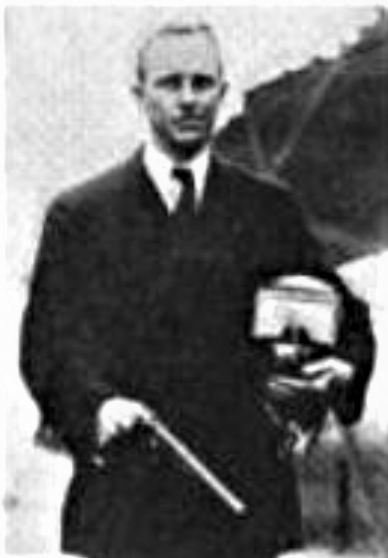

Personal information
- Born: January 18, 1879 New York, New York, United States
- Died: September 18, 1929 (aged 50) Westbury, New York, United States

Sport
- Sport: Sports shooting, polo

Thomas LeBoutillier II, sometimes spelled Le Boutillier (January 18, 1879 – September 18, 1929) was an American sports shooter and polo player. He competed in the 50 yard free pistol event at the 1908 Summer Olympics.

== Biography ==
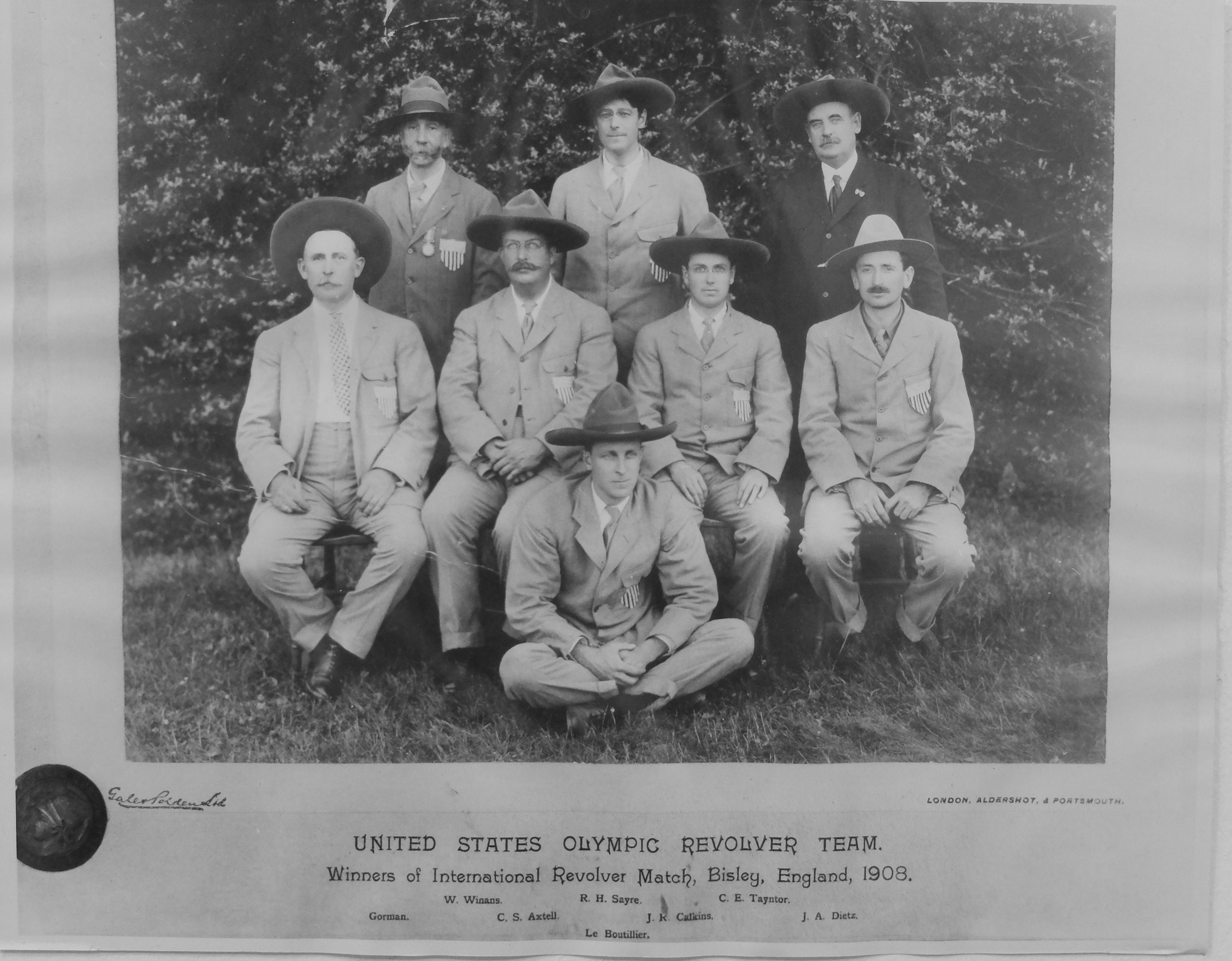
1908 United States Olympic shooting team, LeBoutillier pictured at the bottom

LeBoutillier was born on January 18, 1879, in New York City to a prominent wealthy family. Among his relatives were George LeBoutillier, a cousin, who was a prominent railroad official, Phillip LeBoutillier, a brother, who was for a time the president of Best & Co., and John, his father, who was a partner in the firm Leboutillier Bros. He grew up in Long Island on North Shore.

LeBoutillier attended high school in Andover, Massachusetts, at Phillips Academy. He later attended Yale University, from which he graduated in 1899. After graduating from there, LeBoutillier worked in the dry goods business through 1908, after which he served one year as the manager of a real estate corporation. He became the manager and treasurer of the Wheatley Building and Contracting Company in February 1909. He later was the president of the DuBois Fence Company, an importer of fences from France.

LeBoutillier was a member of Squadron A, N. G. N. Y. as a private from 1904 to 1908, before being honorably discharged in 1909 as a corporal. He took up competitive shooting in the early 1900s, winning in 1905 the United States Revolver Association (USRA) military championship. By 1908, he had become the secretary of the USRA. LeBoutillier later won a revolver tournament in Europe and in 1908 was selected to the United States Olympic shooting team. He competed in the 50 yard free pistol event and placed 19th with a score of 436.

LeBoutillier was also prominent in polo. He was a player and also served as a referee at times. He competed with the Meadowbrook Polo Club and was ranked as the team's best player. On September 18, 1929, LeBoutillier died at the age of 50 while in the midst of a polo tournament, having suffered a heart attack in-game. The opposing team had just scored their third goal and the players were going to the middle of the field for the lineup, when he suffered the heart attack, slid off his horse and then onto the ground. His teammates hurried to his assistance, and the Meadow Brook manager called for Dr. Francis J. Marx and Dr. Thomas Cassidy, both a quarter mile away at International Field. He was still living when they arrived, but died shortly after, fifteen minutes after falling off his horse.

Afterward, the game was stopped, and the tournament was suspended in respect for LeBoutillier; the flag at the Meadow Brook clubhouse was lowered to half-mast. His death received widespread coverage, with newspapers across the nation and even in foreign countries reporting his death. He was survived by his wife and four children.
