= John Martin (sport shooter) =

British sport shooter

Personal information
- Full name: John Martin
- Born: 17 May 1868 Glasgow, Scotland
- Died: 27 June 1951 (aged 83) Glasgow, Scotland

Sport
- Sport: Sports shooting
Medal record
Men's shooting
Representing United Kingdom
Olympic Games
Silver medal – second place	1908 London	Military rifle, team

John Martin (17 May 1868 – 27 June 1951) was a British sports shooter. He competed at the 1908 Summer Olympics winning a silver medal in the team military rifle event.

His brother Alex Martin represented Canada at the same Olympics, and his son Alexander Martin competed for Great Britain at the 1924 Olympics.
