= Ernst Rosell =

Swedish sport shooter

Personal information
- Nationality: Swedish
- Born: 3 December 1881 Jönköping, Sweden
- Died: 26 July 1953 (aged 71) Jönköping, Sweden

Sport
- Country: Sweden
- Sport: Sports shooting
Medal record
Men's shooting
Representing Sweden
Olympic Games
Gold medal – first place	1908 London	Team running deer

Ernst Oscar Rosell (3 December 1881 – 26 July 1953) was a Swedish sport shooter who competed in the 1908 Summer Olympics.

In 1908, he won the gold medal in the team running deer, single shots event.

In the 1908 Summer Olympics, he also participated in the following events:

- running deer, double shots – eighth place
- running deer, single shots – eleventh place
- 1000 yard free rifle – 46th place
