= Alexander McCulloch =

British rower

- McCulloch in 1908

Medal record

Men's rowing

Representing Great Britain

Olympic Games
Silver medal – second place	1908 London	Single sculls

Alexander McCulloch (25 October 1887 – 5 September 1951) was a British rower who competed in the 1908 Summer Olympics.

== Biography ==
McCulloch was born at Melbourne, Australia, the son of George McCulloch. His father, who was born in Scotland, made his fortune at Broken Hill in Australia and returned with his family to Britain about 1891 and set up home at 184 Queens Gate, London (demolished 1971).

McCulloch attended Winchester College where he was a member of the Winchester College Boating Club (WCBC) and developed a keen interest and proficiency in rowing. He then went to University College, Oxford. In 1907 he competed in, and was runner up to Captain Darell in the Diamond Sculls at Henley Royal Regatta. In 1908 he rowed for Oxford in the University Boat Race against Cambridge. Also in 1908, McCulloch, as a member of the Leander Club won the Diamond Sculls at Henley, beating Athol Alexander Stuart.

McCulloch was subsequently selected for the British Team and won the Silver Medal in the single sculls, rowing at the 1908 Summer Olympics. The winner of the Gold Medal was Harry Blackstaffe of the Vesta Rowing Club who was twice McCulloch's age at the time and something of a sculling legend. The final was considered the finest race of the Olympic Regatta and was virtually level until the last 50 yards when Blackstaffe held on to a light advantage to become the oldest sculling champion in Olympic history Victory falling to the home crew in the Sculls, Pairs and Fours, Great Britain could claim a success in every event of the Olympic Regatta of 1908. McCulloch competed in the Diamond Challenge Sculls again in 1912, when he was runner up to Eric Powell.

In later life McCulloch was one of the coaches of Jack Wilson and Ran Laurie.

McCulloch died in England at the age of 63.

== Portrait by John Singer Sargent ==
George McCulloch was an avid art collector and bought works by many pre-eminent pre-raphaelites and impressionists. Alexander McCulloch was himself the subject of a portrait called "On His Holidays... Norway" painted in 1901/1902 by John Singer Sargent. At the time the McCullochs, accompanied by John Singer Sargent, were on a salmon fishing holiday in Norway. John Singer Sargent originally painted Alexander in a standing position holding a landing net but decided the portrait looked too contrived. John Singer Sargent turned the canvas on its side and painted directly on top of the original portrait. Alexander is now portrayed laying his side at the side of a river in a more natural and relaxed pose. At the time of the portrait Alexander was a pupil at Winchester College, a Public School, and in the portrait the school tie can be seen serving as a belt for his trousers. The painting is now on display at the Lady Lever Art Gallery in Merseyside, England. It was acquired by Lord Leverhulme, along with several other paintings, shortly after the death of George McCulloch. Lord Leverhulme, who regarded "On His Holidays...Norway" as his favourite painting, had for a long time tried to have his own portrait painted by John Singer Sargent but without success.

== See also ==
- List of Oxford University Boat Race crews
