= Alexander Martin (British sport shooter) =

British sport shooter

Personal information
- Born: 29 January 1895
- Died: 28 October 1962 (aged 67)

Sport
- Sport: Sports shooting

Alexander Elsden Martin (29 January 1895 – 28 October 1962) was a British sport shooter. He competed in the 1924 Summer Olympics, finishing ninth in the 600 metre free rifle competition.

His father is John Martin, who won a silver medal in shooting at the 1908 Olympics.
