= Wisterman, Ohio =

Unincorporated community in Ohio, U.S.

Coordinates: 41°07′25″N 84°14′16″W

Wisterman is an unincorporated community in Putnam County, in the U.S. state of Ohio.

== History ==
Wisterman was platted in 1883 when the railroad was extended to that point. A post office called Wisterman was established in 1880, and remained in operation until 1910.

== Notable person ==
Ivan Eastman, a sport shooter who competed in the 1908 Summer Olympics, was born in Wisterman in 1884.
