= Bernhard von Gaza =

German rower (1881–1917)

Personal information
- Born: 6 May 1881 Usedom, Germany
- Died: 25 September 1917 (aged 36) Menin Road Ridge, Langemark, Passchendaele salient, Belgium

Sport
- Sport: Rowing
- Club: RG Wiking Berlin 1896
Medal record
Men's rowing
Representing Germany
Olympic Games
Bronze medal – third place	1908 London	Single sculls
European Rowing Championships
Bronze medal – third place	1913 Ghent	Double scull

Bernhard von Gaza (6 May 1881 – 25 September 1917) was a German rower who competed in the 1908 Summer Olympics. He won a bronze medal in single sculls.

Barnhard was killed during the Battle of Menin Road Ridge of World War I. On 23 September 1917 he was wounded while leading an attack to recapture the 'Winterstellung' (Eagle Trench, Eagle House, Louis Farm), just east of Langemark. Barnhard was taken prisoner of war and transported to Dozinghem Casualty Clearing Station, where he succumbed to his wounds. He is buried at Dozinghem Military Cemetery, plot XVI, row B, grave 6.

== See also ==
- List of Olympians killed in World War I
