= Kellogg Casey =

American sport shooter (1877–1938)

Personal information
- Born: September 17, 1877 New York, New York, United States
- Died: October 18, 1938 (aged 61) Wilmington, Delaware, United States

Sport
- Sport: Sports shooting
Medal record
Men's shooting
Representing United States
Olympic Games
Gold medal – first place	1908 London	Team military rifle
Silver medal – second place	1908 London	1000 yard free rifle

Kellogg Kennon Venable Casey (September 17, 1877 – October 18, 1938) was an American sport shooter, who competed in the 1908 Summer Olympics.

He was the son of Joseph J. Casey and Mary C. Martin Casey.

In the 1908 Olympics, he won a gold medal in the team military rifle event and a silver medal in the 1000 yard free rifle event.
