= Charles Axtell =

American Sport Shooter (1859–1932)

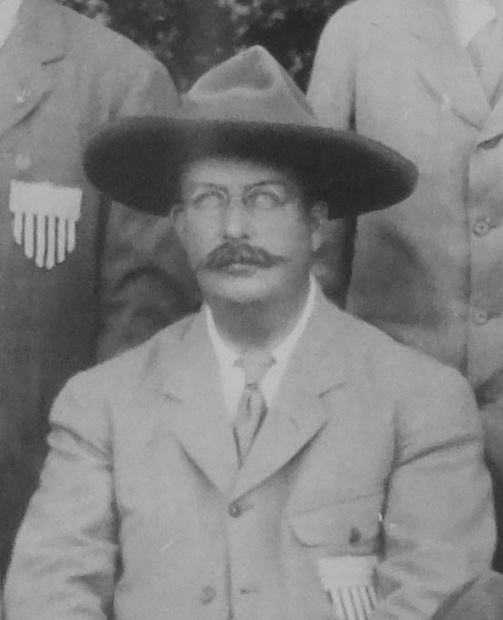

Personal information
- Born: Charles Sumner Axtell; January 29, 1859 Hyannis, Massachusetts, U.S.
- Died: November 24, 1932 (aged 73) Springfield, Massachusetts, U.S.

Sport
- Sport: Sports shooting
Medal record
Men's shooting
Representing United States
Olympic Games
Gold medal – first place	1908 London	Team pistol

Charles Sumner Axtell (January 29, 1859 – November 24, 1932) was an American sport shooter who competed at the 1908 Summer Olympics. At the 1908 Olympics he won a gold medal in the team pistol event and finished in fourth place in the individual pistol event.
