= Ted Ranken =

British sport shooter (1875–1950)

Ted Ranken Thomas (Tom) Ranken.
Personal information
- Born: 18 May 1875 Edinburgh, Scotland
- Died: 27 April 1950 (aged 74) Edinburgh, Scotland

Sport
- Sport: Sports shooting
Medal record
Men's shooting
Representing United Kingdom
Olympic Games
Silver medal – second place	1908 London	Single-shot running deer
Silver medal – second place	1908 London	Double-shot running deer
Silver medal – second place	1908 London	Team running deer

Thomas "Ted" Ranken (18 May 1875 – 27 April 1950), was a British sport shooter, who competed at the 1908 Summer Olympics and 1924 Summer Olympics.

In the 1908 Olympics, he won silver medals in the single-shot running deer event, the double-shot running deer event, and the team single-shot running deer event. He was also fifth in the 1000 yard free rifle event.
