= Shooting at the 1908 Summer Olympics – Men's 50 yard team pistol =

Sports shooting at the Olympics

Men's 50 yard team free pistol at the Games of the IV Olympiad
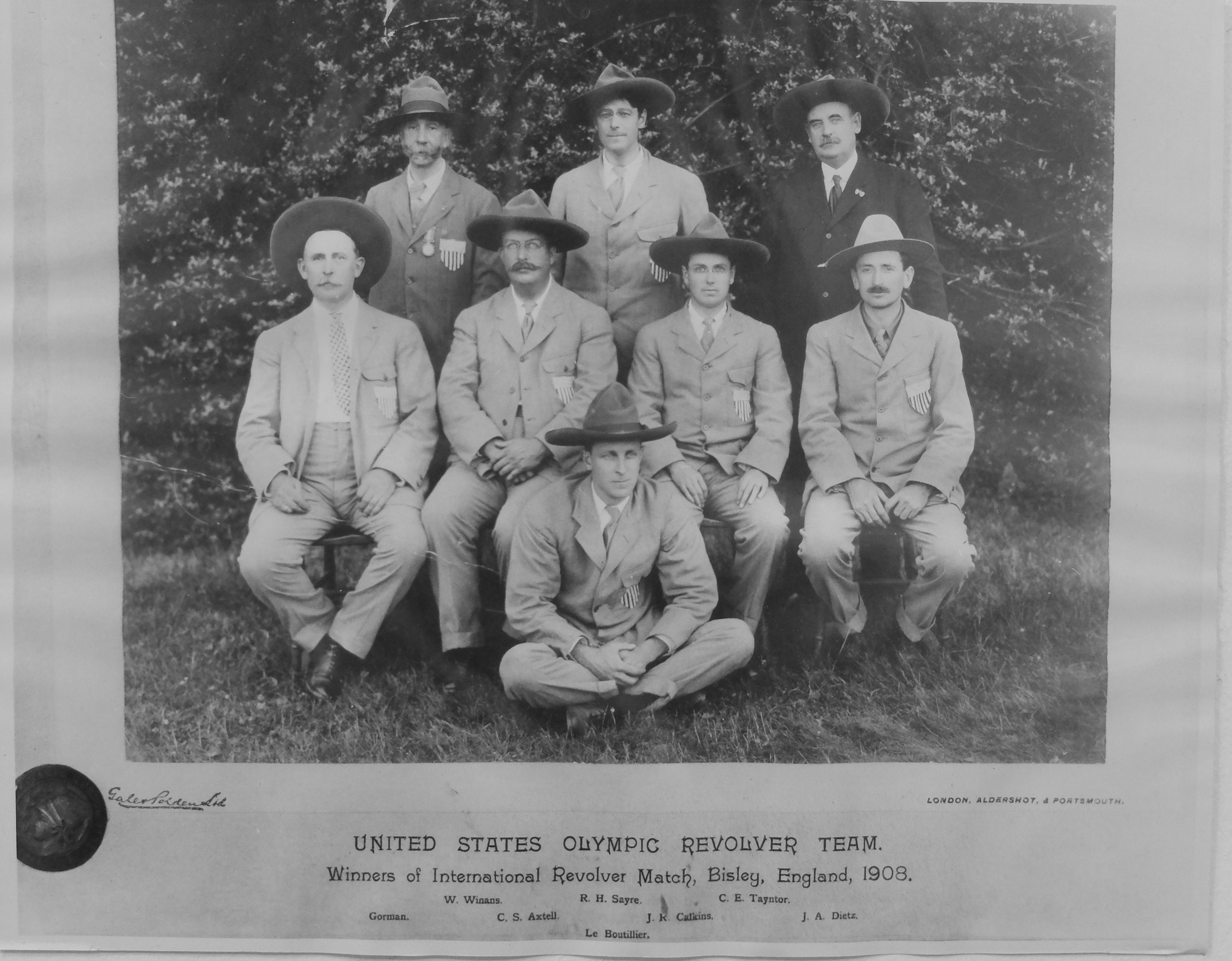
- United States team
- Venue: Bisley rifle range
- Date: 11 July 1908
- Competitors: 28 from 7 nations
- Winning score: 1914

Medalists
1st place, gold medalist(s)		United States: Charles Axtell; Irving Calkins; John Dietz; James Gorman
2nd place, silver medalist(s)		Belgium: René Englebert; Charles Paumier du Verger; Réginald Storms; Paul Van Asbroeck
3rd place, bronze medalist(s)		Great Britain: Geoffrey Coles; William Ellicott; Henry Lynch-Staunton; Jesse Wallingford

The men's team revolver and pistol competition was one of 15 shooting sports events on the Shooting at the 1908 Summer Olympics programme. It was held on 11 July. There were 28 competitors from 7 nations, with each nation sending a team of four. The event was won by the United States in the nation's debut in the event. All three teams on the podium were new; Great Britain (bronze) was also making its debut, while Belgium (silver) had finished fourth in 1900.

== Background ==
This was the second appearance of a team version of what would become (for individuals) standardised as the men's ISSF 50 meter pistol event. The team event was held 4 times, at every Summer Olympics from 1900 to 1920 (except 1904, when no shooting events were held).

Great Britain, Greece, Sweden, and the United States each made their debut in the event. Belgium, France, and the Netherlands made their second appearance, having previously competed in 1900. Reigning champion Switzerland did not return.

== Competition format ==
The competition had each shooter fire 60 shots, in 10 series of 6 shots each, at a distance of 50 yards. The target was round, 50 centimetres in diameter, with 10 scoring rings. Scoring for each shot was up to 10 points, in increments of 1 point. The maximum individual score possible was 600 points, with a team maximum of 2400 points. Any revolver or pistol could be used; only open sights were allowed. Any ammunition with a metal cartridge case could be used. The individual and team events were separate, with scores not carrying over.

== Schedule ==
Date	Time	Round
Saturday, 11 July 1908		Final

== Results ==
Rank	Nation	Shooter	Score
1st place, gold medalist(s)	United States	Team total	1914
1st place, gold medalist(s)	United States	James Gorman	501
1st place, gold medalist(s)	United States	Irving Calkins	473
1st place, gold medalist(s)	United States	John Dietz	472
1st place, gold medalist(s)	United States	Charles Axtell	468
2nd place, silver medalist(s)	Belgium	Team total	1863
2nd place, silver medalist(s)	Belgium	Paul Van Asbroeck	493
2nd place, silver medalist(s)	Belgium	Réginald Storms	477
2nd place, silver medalist(s)	Belgium	Charles Paumier du Verger	462
2nd place, silver medalist(s)	Belgium	René Englebert	431
3rd place, bronze medalist(s)	Great Britain	Team total	1817
3rd place, bronze medalist(s)	Great Britain	Jesse Wallingford	477
3rd place, bronze medalist(s)	Great Britain	Geoffrey Coles	459
3rd place, bronze medalist(s)	Great Britain	Henry Lynch-Staunton	446
3rd place, bronze medalist(s)	Great Britain	William Ellicott	435
4	France	Team total	1750
4	France	André Barbillat	463
4	France	André Regaud	440
4	France	Léon Moreaux	436
4	France	Jean Depassio	411
5	Sweden	Team total	1732
5	Sweden	Vilhelm Carlberg	471
5	Sweden	Eric Carlberg	462
5	Sweden	Johan Hübner von Holst	416
5	Sweden	Franz-Albert Schartau	383
6	Netherlands	Team total	1632
6	Netherlands	Jacob van der Kop	449
6	Netherlands	Gerard van den Bergh	401
6	Netherlands	Jan de Blécourt	398
6	Netherlands	Piet ten Bruggen Cate	384
7	Greece	Team total	1576
7	Greece	Frangiskos Mavrommatis	419
7	Greece	Alexandros Theofilakis	401
7	Greece	Ioannis Theofilakis	398
7	Greece	Georgios Orphanidis	358

== Sources ==
- Cook, Theodore Andrea (1908). The Fourth Olympiad, Being the Official Report. London: British Olympic Association.
- De Wael, Herman (2001). "Shooting 1908". Herman's Full Olympians.
