= William Newton (sport shooter) =

British sports shooter

William Savage Newton
Personal information
- Full name: William Savage Newton
- Born: 1878 Montreal, Quebec, Canada
- Died: 6 January 1915 (aged 36–37) Belgium

Sport
- Sport: Sports shooting

William Savage Newton (1878 – 6 January 1915) was a British sports shooter. He competed in the 50 yard free pistol event at the 1908 Summer Olympics.

Born in Montreal, Quebec, of parents who later settled in England at Surbiton, Surrey, he was an engineer in civilian life and also served as a Captain in the Honourable Artillery Company. He was a Freemason, initiated into FitzRoy Lodge No 569 E.C. in London in 1913.

He was killed in action in Belgium during World War I, recordedly aged 36. He was buried in Kemmel Chateau Military Cemetery.
