= Shooting at the 1908 Summer Olympics – Men's military rifle, team =

Sports shooting at the Olympics

Men's team military rifle at the Games of the IV Olympiad
- Venue: Bisley rifle range
- Dates: 10–11 July 1908
- Competitors: 48 from 8 nations

Medalists
1st place, gold medalist(s)		United States; Charles Benedict, Kellogg Casey, Ivan Eastman, William Leushner, William Martin, Charles Winder
2nd place, silver medalist(s)		Great Britain; Arthur Fulton, John Martin, Harcourt Ommundsen, Walter Padgett, Philip Richardson, Fleetwood Varley
3rd place, bronze medalist(s)		Canada; Charles Crowe, William Eastcott, Harry Kerr, Dugald McInnes, William Smith, Bertram Williams

The men's team military rifle, also referred to as the International, was one of 15 events on the Shooting at the 1908 Summer Olympics programme. Teams consisted of six shooters, with each shooter firing 90 shots at targets at varying distances. Fifteen shots were fired at each of six distances: 200, 500, 600, 800, 900, and 1000 yds 1,000 yards (910 m) (based on traditional military rifle range distances in English speaking countries). A bulls-eye counted for five points, and thus the highest possible score for each shooter was 450 points, with the team maximum being 2700.

Each shooter was required to use his nation's official military rifle.

== Results ==
Place	Nation	Shooter	Score						
Place	Nation	Shooter	200 yd (180 m)	500 yd (460 m)	600 yd (550 m)	800 yd (730 m)	900 yd (820 m)	1,000 yd (910 m)	Total
1	United States	Team total	428	438	425	436	405	399	2531
1	United States	William Leushner	71	75	73	73	67	71	430
1	United States	William Martin	71	74	72	73	71	69	430
1	United States	Charles Winder	69	74	72	73	72	69	429
1	United States	Kellogg Casey	74	71	69	73	67	69	423
1	United States	Ivan Eastman	70	74	70	71	67	60	412
1	United States	Charles Benedict	73	70	69	73	61	61	407
2	Great Britain	Team total	419	436	426	433	399	383	2497
2	Great Britain	Harcourt Ommundsen	68	74	73	72	70	67	424
2	Great Britain	Fleetwood Varley	72	75	71	71	67	67	423
2	Great Britain	Arthur Fulton	71	70	71	75	65	65	417
2	Great Britain	Philip Richardson	68	73	70	72	64	66	413
2	Great Britain	Walter Padgett	70	73	69	71	68	59	410
2	Great Britain	John Martin	70	71	72	72	66	59	410
3	Canada	Team total	412	418	414	434	394	367	2439
3	Canada	William Smith	71	72	70	75	72	61	421
3	Canada	Charles Crowe	69	66	71	74	65	70	415
3	Canada	Bertram Williams	71	74	70	74	65	70	414
3	Canada	Dugald McInnes	68	73	73	74	65	60	413
3	Canada	William Eastcott	69	63	65	70	64	61	392
3	Canada	Harry Kerr	64	70	65	67	61	57	384
4	France	Team total	397	417	378	401	373	306	2227
4	France	Raoul de Boigne	70	72	65	67	60	51	385
4	France	Albert Courquin	67	68	68	62	58	60	383
4	France	Eugène Balme	70	71	65	65	65	43	379
4	France	Daniel Mérillon	59	65	60	68	61	50	376
4	France	Léon Hecht	64	70	63	72	65	55	376
4	France	André Parmentier	67	71	57	67	64	47	373
5	Sweden	Team total	423	425	381	378	337	269	2213
5	Sweden	Claës Rundberg	72	75	64	66	57	54	388
5	Sweden	Ossian Jörgensen	68	73	71	67	56	57	382
5	Sweden	Janne Gustafsson	70	69	63	64	59	51	376
5	Sweden	Per-Olof Arvidsson	72	74	66	68	50	44	374
5	Sweden	Axel Jansson	69	69	61	59	58	35	351
5	Sweden	Gustaf Adolf Jonsson	72	65	66	54	57	28	342
6	Norway	Team total	396	391	386	394	329	296	2192
6	Norway	Ole Sæther	65	69	68	67	63	53	385
6	Norway	Einar Liberg	70	70	70	65	54	46	375
6	Norway	Gudbrand Skatteboe	63	61	61	67	58	59	369
6	Norway	Albert Helgerud	65	63	60	67	49	58	362
6	Norway	Mathias Glomnes	69	58	63	59	52	51	352
6	Norway	Jørgen Bru	64	70	64	69	53	29	349
7	Greece	Team total	384	385	357	316	282	275	1999
7	Greece	Ioannis Theofilakis	70	68	59	65	48	47	357
7	Greece	Frangiskos Mavrommatis	66	63	62	60	60	38	349
7	Greece	Alexandros Theofilakis	64	71	65	64	32	53	349
7	Greece	Georgios Orphanidis	60	62	59	40	48	56	325
7	Greece	Matthias Triantafyllidis	62	60	56	50	51	35	314
7	Greece	Defkalion Rediadis	62	61	56	37	43	46	305
8	Denmark	Team total	375	359	369	307	279	220	1909
8	Denmark	Niels Andersen	65	60	63	68	53	43	352
8	Denmark	Niels Christian Christensen	67	67	64	49	42	44	333
8	Denmark	Lorents Jensen	60	56	59	57	48	46	326
8	Denmark	Niels Laursen	56	52	58	64	43	36	309
8	Denmark	Julius Hillemann-Jensen	65	60	62	48	45	27	307
8	Denmark	Ole Olsen	62	64	63	21	48	24	282

== Sources ==
- Cook, Theodore Andrea (1908). The Fourth Olympiad, Being the Official Report. London: British Olympic Association.
- De Wael, Herman (2001). "Shooting 1908". Herman's Full Olympians.
