= Wrestling at the 1908 Summer Olympics – Men's freestyle bantamweight =

Men's bantamweight freestyle wrestling at the Games of the IV Olympiad
- Venue: White City Stadium
- Date: July 20
- Competitors: 13 from 3 nations

Medalists
| 1st place, gold medalist(s) | | George Mehnert | United States |
| 2nd place, silver medalist(s) | | William Press | Great Britain |
| 3rd place, bronze medalist(s) | | Aubert Côté | Canada |

The freestyle bantamweight was one of five freestyle wrestling weight classes contested on the Wrestling at the 1908 Summer Olympics programme. Like all other wrestling events, it was open only to men. The bantamweight was the lightest class, allowing wrestlers of up to 54 kilograms (119 lb). Each nation could enter up to 12 wrestlers.

11 British athletes, 1 American, and 1 Canadian participated.

== Competition format ==
The event was a single-elimination tournament with a bronze medal match between the semifinal losers. The final and bronze medal match were best two-of-three, while all other rounds were a single bout. Bouts were 15 minutes, unless one wrestler lost by fall (two shoulders on the ground at the same time). Other than falls, decisions were made by the judges or, if they did not agree, the referee.

Wrestlers could "take hold how and where they please[d]" except that "hair, flesh, ears, private parts, or clothes may not be seized"; striking, scratching, twisting fingers, butting, and kicking were prohibited. Holds "obtained that the fear of breakage or dislocation of a limb shall induce a wrestler to give the fall" were outlawed, and particularly the double-nelson, hammerlock, strangle, half-strangle, scissors, hang, flying mare with palm uppermost, and the foot twist.

== Results ==
=== Standings ===
| Place | Wrestler | Nation |
|---|---|---|
| 1 | George Mehnert | United States of America |
| 2 | William J. Press | Great Britain |
| 3 | Aubert Côté | Canada |
| 4 | Frederick Tomkins | Great Britain |
| 5 | Fred Davis | Great Britain |
| 5 | Burt Sansom | Great Britain |
| 5 | George Saunders | Great Britain |
| 5 | Harry Sprenger | Great Britain |
| 9 | John Cox | Great Britain |
| 9 | William Cox | Great Britain |
| 9 | Frederick Knight | Great Britain |
| 9 | Guy Schwan | Great Britain |
| 9 | Henry Witherall | Great Britain |

=== Bracket ===
First Round
Fall (5:27)
William Press (GBR)
Henry Witherall (GBR)
Fall (4:31)
Bruce Sansom (GBR)
George Schwan (GBR)
Fall (6:31)
Frederick Tomkins (GBR)
William Cox (GBR)
Fall (4:22)
George Saunders (GBR)
John Cox (GBR)
Decision
Fred Davis (GBR)
Frank Knight (GBR)

Quarter-finals
Fall (8:48)
William Press (GBR)
Bruce Sansom (GBR)
Fall (4:57)
Frederick Tomkins (GBR)
George Saunders (GBR)
Decision
Fred Davis (GBR)
Aubert Côté (CAN)
Fall (4:01)
Harry Sprenger (GBR)
George Mehnert (USA)

Semi-finals
Fall (0:55)
William Press (GBR)
Frederick Tomkins (GBR)
Fall (6:40)
Aubert Côté (CAN)
George Mehnert (USA)

Final
2–0 (falls 11:45/3:57)
William Press (GBR) (silver)
George Mehnert (USA) (gold)
Third place
2–0 (falls 3:55/8:50)
Aubert Côté (CAN) (bronze)
Frederick Tomkins (GBR)

== Sources ==
- Cook, Theodore Andrea (1908). The Fourth Olympiad, Being the Official Report. London: British Olympic Association.
- De Wael, Herman (2001). "Freestyle Wrestling 1908". Herman's Full Olympians.
