= Maurice Blood =

British sport shooter (1870–1940)

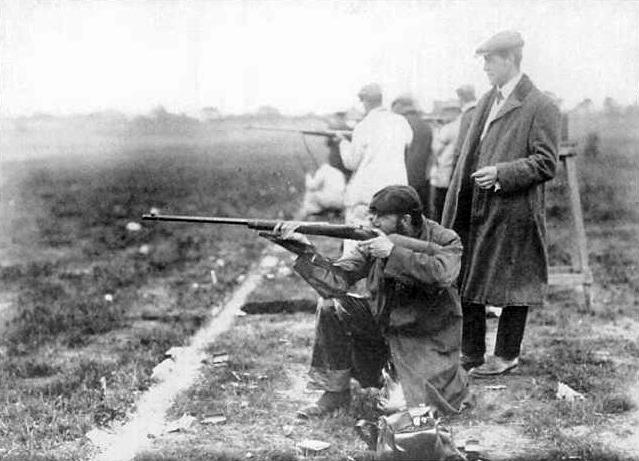
- Maurice Blood shooting

Personal information
- Born: 15 February 1870 Clifton, Bristol, England
- Died: 31 March 1940 (aged 70) Hampstead, London, England

Sport
- Sport: Sports shooting
Medal record
Men's shooting
Representing United Kingdom
Olympic Games
Bronze medal – third place	1908 London	1000 yard rifle

Maurice Blood (15 February 1870 – 31 March 1940) was a British sport shooter, who competed in the 1908 Summer Olympics.

In the 1908 Olympics, he won a bronze medal in the 1000 yard free rifle event, was fourth in the single-shot running deer event and the double-shot running deer event and finished 11th in the 300 metre free rifle event.

Blood had been a schoolmaster before becoming a stockbroker and had represented the London Stock Exchange Rifle Club.
