= Károly Levitzky =

Hungarian rower

Medal record

Men's rowing

Representing Hungary

Olympic Games
Bronze medal – third place	1908 London	single sculls

Károly Levitzky (1 May 1885 – 23 August 1978) was a Hungarian rower who competed at the 1908 Summer Olympics in London and at the 1912 Summer Olympics in Stockholm. He won a bronze medal in single sculls in London.

Levitzky was born in Dorgoș and died in Budapest. He was Jewish.
