= Harry Blackstaffe =

British rower (1868–1951)

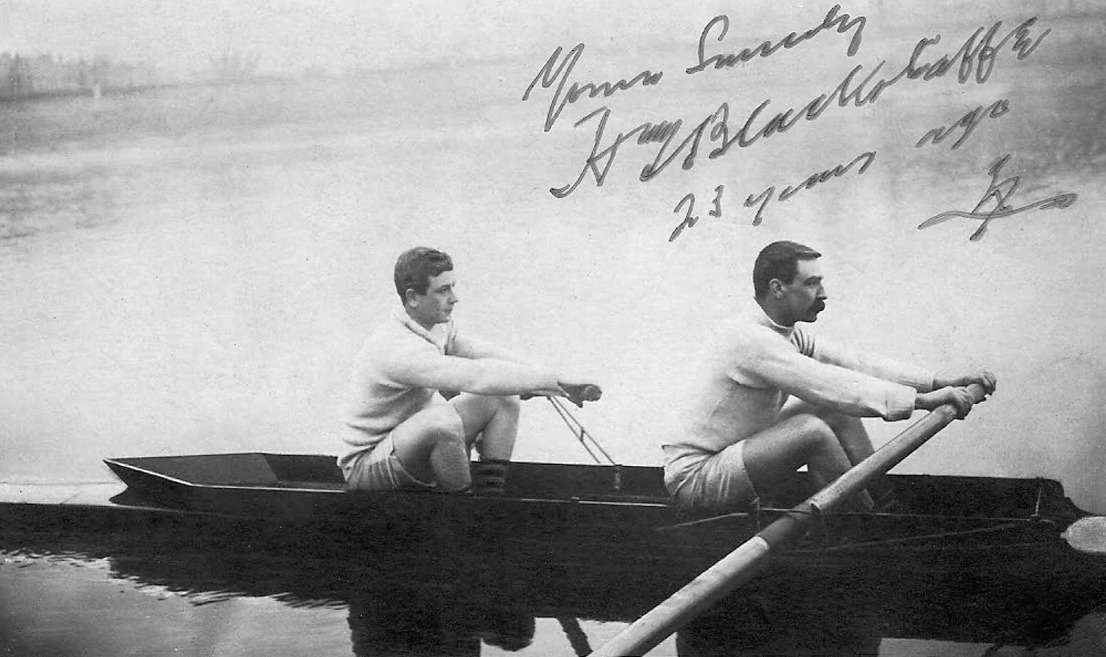
- Harry Tate and Harry Blackstaffe (right)

Personal information
- Full name: Henry Thomas Blackstaffe
- Born: 28 July 1868 Islington, Greater London, Great Britain
- Died: 22 August 1951 (aged 83) West Wickham, Greater London, Great Britain
- Weight: 68 kg (150 lb)

Sport
- Sport: Rowing
- Club: Vesta Rowing Club, Putney
Medal record
Representing Great Britain
Summer Olympics
Gold medal – first place	1908 London	Single sculls

Henry Thomas "Harry" Blackstaffe (28 July 1868 – 22 August 1951) was a British rower who competed in the 1908 Summer Olympics.

Blackstaffe was born in Islington, London, and became a butcher. He was a long-standing member of Vesta Rowing Club in Putney and also a cross-country runner who represented South London Harriers in the National Championships. As a single sculler, he won nine victories in the London Cup at the Metropolitan Regatta. He first won the Wingfield Sculls in 1897, but in 1898, 1899, and 1900, he was beaten by Benjamin Hunting Howell. He won again in 1901, defeating Saint-George Ashe and Arthur Cloutte. He lost to Cloutte in 1902 and to Ashe in 1904 but beat them both in 1905 and 1906. At first, he had difficulty in having his entry accepted for Henley Royal Regatta but competed in the Diamond Challenge Sculls in 1905 when he lost to Frederick Septimus Kelly. In 1906, he won the Diamond Sculls, beating Captain Darell. In 1908, he won the Wingfield Sculls again, and his ninth London Cup, but his major success was winning the gold medal in the single sculls, rowing at the 1908 Summer Olympics. He was forty, and his opponent in the final Alexander McCulloch was exactly half his age, and he had won the Diamonds that year. The final was considered the finest race of the Olympic Regatta and was virtually level until the last 50 yards when Blackstaffe held on to a light advantage to become the oldest sculling champion in Olympic history.

After this victory, Blackstaffe retired and was made a Freeman of the City of London. He was later senior life vice-president of the Amateur Rowing Association. He died at West Wickham, aged 83.
