= Henry Lynch-Staunton =

British sport shooter

Personal information
- Born: 5 November 1873 Isle of Wight, England
- Died: 15 November 1941 (aged 68) Berwick-upon-Tweed, Northumberland, England

Sport
- Sport: Sports shooting
Medal record
Men's shooting
Representing United Kingdom
Olympic Games
| Bronze medal – third place | 1908 London | Team pistol |

Henry George Lynch-Staunton (5 November 1873 – 15 November 1941) was a British sport shooter who competed at the 1908 Summer Olympics.

In the 1908 Olympics, he won a bronze medal in the team pistol event and was 13th in the individual pistol event.
