= Ernst Wagner-Hohenlobbese =

German sports shooter

Personal information
- Born: 15 January 1866
- Died: 29 March 1935 (aged 69)

Sport
- Sport: Sports shooting

Ernst Wagner-Hohenlobbese (15 January 1866 – 29 March 1935) was a German sports shooter. He competed in the 1000 yard free rifle event at the 1908 Summer Olympics.
