= Walter Padgett =

British sports shooter (1867–1929)

Personal information
- Born: 1867 Kingston upon Hull, England
- Died: 4 May 1929 (aged 61–62) Kingston upon Hull, England

Sport
- Sport: Sports shooting
Medal record
Men's shooting
Representing United Kingdom
Olympic Games
| Silver medal – second place | 1908 London | Military rifle, team |

Walter Padgett (1867 – 4 May 1929) was a British sports shooter. He competed at the 1908 Summer Olympics winning a silver medal in the team military rifle event.
