= Rowing at the 1908 Summer Olympics – Men's single sculls =

Rowing at the Olympics

Men's single sculls at the Games of the IV Olympiad
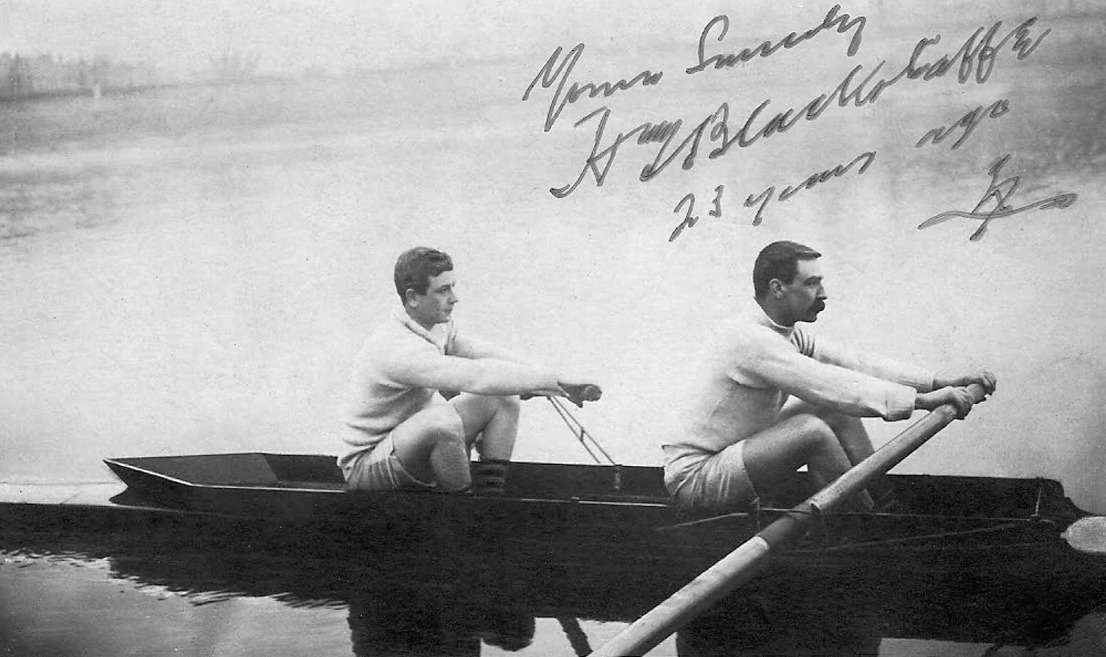
- Gold medalist Harry Blackstaffe (right, seen with Harry Tate during a coxless pair competition sometime in the early 1900s)
- Venue: River Thames
- Dates: 28–31 July 1908
- Competitors: 9 from 6 nations
- Winning time: 9:26.0

Medalists
1st place, gold medalist(s)		Harry Blackstaffe; Great Britain
2nd place, silver medalist(s)		Alexander McCulloch; Great Britain
3rd place, bronze medalist(s)		Bernhard von Gaza; Germany
3rd place, bronze medalist(s)		Károly Levitzky; Hungary

The men's single sculls was one of four rowing events on the Rowing at the 1908 Summer Olympics programme. Nations could enter up to 2 boats (total of 2 rowers). Nine rowers from six nations competed. The host nation, Great Britain, earned the top two spots with Harry Blackstaffe taking gold and Alexander McCulloch silver. It was the first victory in the event for Great Britain, which had taken bronze in 1900. The two bronze medals went to semifinalists Bernhard von Gaza of Germany and Károly Levitzky of Hungary, both nations making their debut in the event.

== Background ==
This was the third appearance of the event. Rowing had been on the programme in 1896 but was cancelled due to bad weather. The single sculls has been held every time that rowing has been contested, beginning in 1900.

For the first time, there was a strong international field. The Diamond Challenge Sculls winners competing were Lou Scholes of Great Britain (1904), Harry Blackstaffe of Great Britain (1906), and Alexander McCulloch, also of Great Britain, (1908). Great Britain had another strong sculler in London for the Games in Frederick Septimus Kelly (1902, 1903, and 1905 Diamond champion), but he had retired from sculling and competed in the eight instead; only two of the British rowers would have been able to compete under the 1908 national limits in any case. Prominent American sculler Frank Greer, the reigning Olympic champion, did not compete.

Belgium, Canada, Germany, Hungary, and Italy each made their debut in the event. Great Britain was the only nation to have competed before, making its second appearance.

== Competition format ==
The 1908 tournament featured four rounds of one-on-one races; with 9 boats in the competition, 7 had byes to the quarterfinals and only 1 race was held in the first round. Semifinal losers each received bronze medals. The course was 1.5 miles in length, with two slight bends near the start and about halfway.

== Schedule ==
Date	Time	Round
Tuesday, 28 July 1908	15:00	First round
Wednesday, 29 July 1908	12:30; 15:00; 16:00	Quarterfinals
Thursday, 30 July 1908	12:30; 16:45	Semifinals
Friday, 31 July 1908	14:30	Final

== Results ==
=== First round ===
==== Heat 1 ====
Von Gaza won easily, and Killer abandoned the race after the German crossed the finish line.

Rank	Rower	Nation	Time	Notes
1	Bernhard von Gaza	Germany	9:35.0	Q
—	Ernő Killer	Hungary	DNF	

=== Quarterfinals ===
==== Quarterfinal 1 ====
Rank	Rower	Nation	Time	Notes
1	Bernhard von Gaza	Germany	9:47.0	Q
2	Lou Scholes	Canada	Unknown	

==== Quarterfinal 2 ====
Rank	Rower	Nation	Time	Notes
1	Károly Levitzky	Hungary	10:08.0	Q
2	Gino Ciabatti	Italy	Unknown	

==== Quarterfinal 3 ====
Bowler capsized, leaving Blackstaffe with the win.

Rank	Rower	Nation	Time	Notes
1	Harry Blackstaffe	Great Britain	10:03.0	Q
—	Walter Bowler	Canada	DNF	

==== Quarterfinal 4 ====
Rank	Rower	Nation	Time	Notes
1	Alexander McCulloch	Great Britain	10:08.0	Q
2	Jozef Hermans	Belgium	Unknown	

=== Semifinals ===
==== Semifinal 1 ====
Rank	Rower	Nation	Time	Notes
1	Alexander McCulloch	Great Britain	10:22.0	Q
3rd place, bronze medalist(s)	Károly Levitzky	Hungary	Unknown	

==== Semifinal 2 ====
von Gaza fell ill at the 1500m mark, leaving Blackstaffe to ease off and win.

Rank	Rower	Nation	Time	Notes
1	Harry Blackstaffe	Great Britain	10:14.0	Q
3rd place, bronze medalist(s)	Bernhard von Gaza	Germany	DNF	

=== Final ===
McCulloch took the early lead, but started by pulling fewer strokes than Blackstaffe. McCulloch opened up by a length and led through 1200 yards before being caught by Blackstaffe. At 1 mile, Blackstaffe pulled ahead by ¾ of a length and held this lead to the finish.

Rank	Rower	Nation	Time
1st place, gold medalist(s)	Harry Blackstaffe	Great Britain	9:26.0
2nd place, silver medalist(s)	Alexander McCulloch	Great Britain	9:27.5

== Results summary ==
Rank	Rower	Nation	First round	Quarterfinals	Semifinals	Final
1st place, gold medalist(s)	Harry Blackstaffe	Great Britain	Bye	10:03.0	10:14.0	9:26.0
2nd place, silver medalist(s)	Alexander McCulloch	Great Britain	Bye	10:08.0	10:22.0	9:27.5
3rd place, bronze medalist(s)	Károly Levitzky	Hungary	Bye	10:08.0	Unknown	Did not advance
3rd place, bronze medalist(s)	Bernhard von Gaza	Germany	9:35.0	9:47.0	DNF	Did not advance
5	Gino Ciabatti	Italy	Bye	Unknown	Did not advance	
5	Jozef Hermans	Belgium	Bye	Unknown	Did not advance	
5	Lou Scholes	Canada	Bye	Unknown	Did not advance	
5	Walter Bowler	Canada	Bye	DNF	Did not advance	
9	Ernő Killer	Hungary	DNF	Did not advance		
