= Ernő Killer =

Hungarian rower

Personal information
- Nationality: Hungarian
- Born: 5 January 1881; Cece, Austria-Hungary
- Died: 12 December 1926 (aged 45)

Sport
- Sport: Rowing

Ernő Killer (5 January 1881 – 12 December 1926) was a Hungarian rower. He competed in the men's single sculls event at the 1908 Summer Olympics.
