= Mary C. Martin Casey =

American socialite and clubwoman

- Born: 1836 or 1837
- Died: July 22, 1920 (aged 83); New York, New York, U.S.
- Occupation: Clubwoman
- Spouse: Joseph K. Casey
- Children: 2 (including Kellogg Casey)

Mary C. Martin Casey (1836 or 1837 – July 22, 1920), also known as Mrs. Joseph J. Casey, was an American socialite and clubwoman. She was a charter member of the General Society Daughters of the Revolution 1776 and served as the organization's registrar general and historian general.

== Society life ==
Casey was involved in multiple women's society organizations in New York City. She was a charter member of the General Society Daughters of the Revolution 1776, where she served as a board member for almost twenty years and served as national registrar general. In 1893, she served as the organization's historian general. She was also a charter member of the Knickerbocker Chapter of the Daughters of the American Revolution.

== Personal life and death ==
She was married to Joseph J. Casey, with whom she had two children: Fanny Cannon Casey and Major Kellogg K. V. Casey.

Casey died on July 22, 1920.
