= William Martin (sport shooter) =

American sport shooter

Personal information
- Born: May 13, 1866 Elizabeth, New Jersey, United States
- Died: January 22, 1931 (aged 64) Elizabeth, New Jersey, United States

Sport
- Sport: Sports shooting
Medal record
Men's shooting
Representing United States
Olympic Games
Gold medal – first place	1908 London	Military rifle, team

William B. Martin (May 13, 1866 – January 22, 1931) was an American sport shooter, who competed in the 1908 Summer Olympics.

At the 1908 Olympics, he won a gold medal in the team military rifle event. In the Autumn of 1917, Martin was elected Union County, New Jersey Clerk. He assumed office for a five-year term and was twice re-elected.
