= Patrick Brennan (lacrosse) =

Canadian lacrosse player

Olympic medal record

Men's lacrosse

Representing Canada
Gold medal – first place	1908 London	Team

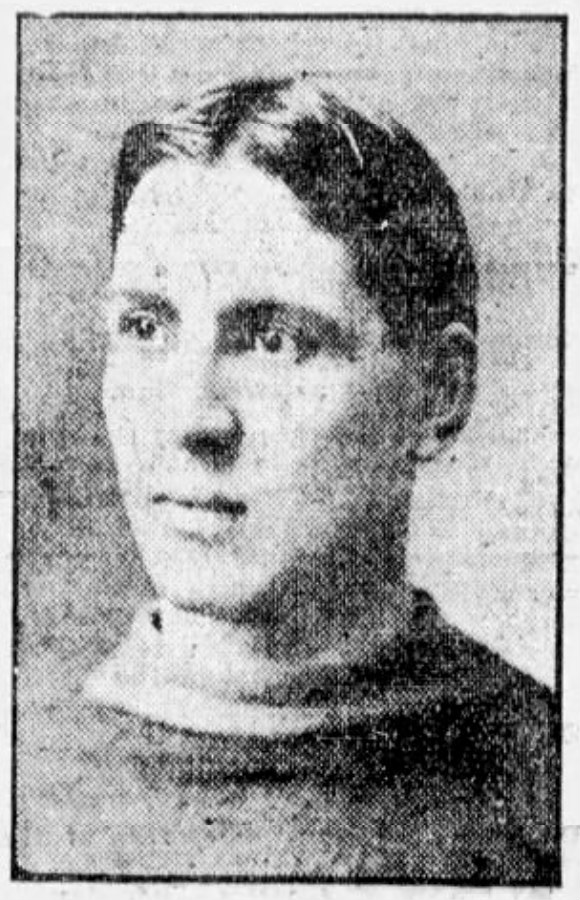
Brennan c. 1905

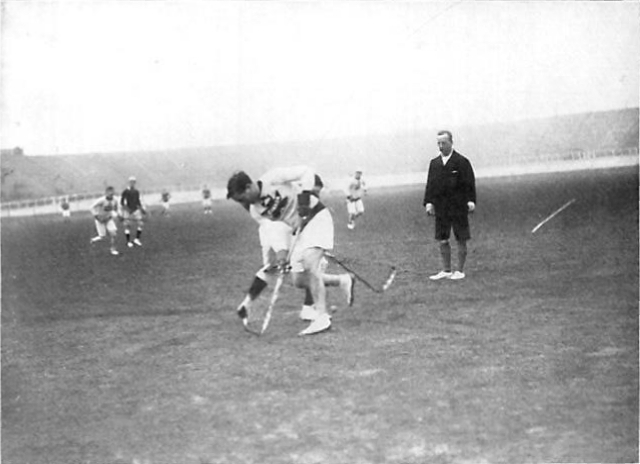
Brennan playing for Canada during the 1908 Summer Olympics

Patrick Joseph "Paddy" Brennan (July 30, 1877 – May 1, 1961) was an Irish-born Canadian lacrosse player who competed in the 1908 Summer Olympics. He was part of the Canadian team which won the gold medal. He was inducted into the Canadian Lacrosse Hall of Fame in 1966.

== Biography ==
Brennan was born in Ireland but moved to Canada at the age of three. At the club level, he represented the Montreal Shamrocks. He died at Notre Dame de l'Esperance Hospital in Montreal in 1961, aged 83.
