= Ivan Eastman =

American sport shooter (1884–1949)

Personal information
- Born: April 1, 1884 Wisterman, Ohio, United States
- Died: February 28, 1949 (aged 64) Wauseon, Ohio, United States

Sport
- Sport: Sports shooting
Medal record
Men's shooting
Representing United States
Olympic Games
Gold medal – first place	1908 London	Military rifle, team

Ivan Leclare Eastman (April 1, 1884 – February 28, 1949) was an American sport shooter, who competed in the 1908 Summer Olympics.

In the 1908 Olympics, he won a gold medal in the team military rifle event and was 13th in 1000 yard free rifle event.
