= Bertram Williams (sport shooter) =

Canadian sports shooter

Personal information
- Full name: Bertram Mills Williams
- Born: 18 December 1876 Bridgetown, Nova Scotia, Canada
- Died: 24 January 1934 (aged 57) Pugwash, Nova Scotia, Canada

Sport
- Sport: Sports shooting
Medal record
Men's shooting
Representing Canada
Olympic Games
| Bronze medal – third place | 1908 London | Military rifle, team |

Bertram Williams (18 December 1876 – 24 January 1934) was a Canadian sports shooter. He competed at the 1908 Summer Olympics winning a bronze medal in the team military rifle event.
