= Thomas Elmitt =

Canadian sports shooter

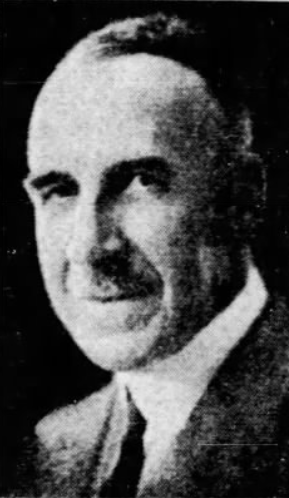

Personal information
- Born: 24 January 1871; Ottawa, Ontario, Canada
- Died: 25 February 1938 (aged 67); Ottawa, Ontario, Canada

Sport
- Sport: Sports shooting

Thomas Francis Elmitt (24 January 1871 – 25 February 1938) was a Canadian sports shooter. He competed in the 1000 yard free rifle event at the 1908 Summer Olympics.
