= René Englebert =

Belgian sport shooter

Personal information
- Full name: René Englebert
- Born: 1 August 1865
- Died: Unknown

Sport
- Sport: Sports shooting
Medal record
Men's shooting
Representing Belgium
Olympic Games
Silver medal – second place	1908 London	Team 50y free pistol

René Englebert (born 1 August 1865, date of death unknown) was a Belgian sport shooter who competed in the 1908 Summer Olympics.
