= William Eastcott =

Canadian sport shooter (1883–1972)

Personal information
- Born: 22 September 1883 Toronto, Ontario, Canada
- Died: 22 August 1972 (aged 88) Grand Rapids, Michigan, United States

Sport
- Sport: Sports shooting
Medal record
Men's shooting
Representing Canada
Olympic Games
Bronze medal – third place	1908 London	Military rifle, team

William Merrill Eastcott (22 September 1883 – 22 August 1972) was a Canadian sport shooter, who competed at the 1908 Summer Olympics, winning a bronze medal in the team military rifle event.
