= Harry Young (cyclist) =

Canadian cyclist

Personal information
- Full name: Henry Lionel Young
- Born: October 29, 1882 Peterborough, Ontario, Canada
- Died: February 11, 1946 (aged 63) Toronto, Ontario, Canada

Cycling career
- Sport: Cycling

Harry Young (October 29, 1882 – February 11, 1946) was a Canadian cyclist. He competed in two events at the 1908 Summer Olympics.
