= Leech Cup =

NRA Trophy

- Sport: Fullbore target rifle
- Competition: National Rifle & Pistol Matches
- Awarded for: 1000 yard match
- Location: Camp Perry
- Country: United States of America
- Presented by: National Rifle Association of America

History
- First award: 1874
- First winner: Colonel John Bodine (USA)

The Leech Cup is a cup named after Major Arthur Blennerhassett Leech, and awarded to long range shooters by the National Rifle Association of America (NRA). It is the oldest trophy awarded in competitive target shooting in the United States. Firing is with rifles equipped with metallic, non-magnifying sights.

== History ==
The cup was presented to the Amateur Rifle Club of New York by Maj. Arthur Leech. He was the Captain of the Irish Rifle Team and in 1874 he had the cup made to celebrate his team coming to America. The US team won the 1874 match by 3 points. The event was shot with the US team using American-made rifles and the Irish team using rifles from Irish maker John Rigby.

It was presented to the National Rifle Association in 1901 by the Amateur Rifle Club of New York. The Cup was lost in 1913 and was not recovered until 1927. The trophy is awarded each year in the NRA National High Power Championships.

The 1903 Cup was awarded to Corporal Charles Blish Winder of the Ohio National Guard.

== See also ==
- List of sport awards
- Prizes named after people
