= Robert Zimmerman (swimmer) =

Canadian swimmer

Personal information
- Born: 2 December 1881 Chicago, Illinois, United States
- Died: 3 December 1980 (aged 99) Florida, United States

Sport
- Sport: Swimming

Robert Zimmerman (2 December 1881 – 3 December 1980) was a Canadian freestyle and backstroke swimmer. He competed at the 1908 Summer Olympics and the 1912 Summer Olympics.
