= Geoffrey Coles =

British sport shooter (1871–1916)

Personal information
- Born: 13 March 1871 Hastings, East Sussex, England
- Died: 27 January 1916 (aged 44) Festubert, France

Sport
- Sport: Sports shooting
Medal record
Men's shooting
Representing United Kingdom
Olympic Games
| Bronze medal – third place | 1908 London | Team pistol |

Geoffrey Horsman Coles (13 March 1871 – 27 January 1916) was a British sport shooter who competed at the 1908 Summer Olympics.

In the 1908 Olympics, he won a bronze medal in the team pistol event and was 11th in the individual pistol event.

Coles was killed in action during the First World War, serving as a private with the Royal Fusiliers near Festubert. He was buried at Brown's Road Military Cemetery nearby.

== See also ==
- List of Olympians killed in World War I
