= James Jones (sport shooter) =

Canadian sports shooter

Personal information
- Born: October 3, 1871
- Died: February 19, 1955 (aged 83)

Sport
- Sport: Sports shooting

James Jones (October 3, 1871 – February 19, 1955) was a Canadian sports shooter. He competed in the 1000 yard free rifle event at the 1908 Summer Olympics.
