= William Smith (sport shooter) =

Canadian sports shooter

Personal information
- Born: 11 May 1877 Ottawa, Ontario, Canada
- Died: 12 March 1953 (aged 75) Ottawa, Ontario, Canada

Sport
- Sport: Sports shooting
Medal record
Men's shooting
Representing Canada
Olympic Games
Bronze medal – third place	1908 London	Military rifle, team

William Smith (11 May 1877 – 12 March 1953) was a Canadian sports shooter. He competed at the 1908 Summer Olympics winning a bronze medal in the team military rifle event.
