= William J. Press =

British wrestler

Olympic medal record

Men's freestyle wrestling

Representing Great Britain

Olympic Games
Silver medal – second place	1908 London	Bantamweight

William J. Press (born 29 January 1881, date of death unknown) was a British wrestler who competed in the 1908 Summer Olympics, where he won the silver medal in the freestyle wrestling bantamweight class.

Press won the British Wrestling Championships in 1906.
