= Dugald McInnes =

Canadian sport shooter

Personal information
- Born: 2 June 1877 Ballachulish, Scotland
- Died: 11 September 1929 (aged 52) Edmonton, Alberta, Canada

Sport
- Sport: Sports shooting
Medal record
Men's shooting
Representing Canada
Olympic Games
| Bronze medal – third place | 1908 London | Military rifle, team |

Dugald McInnes (2 June 1877 – 11 September 1929) was a Canadian sport shooter who competed in the 1908 Summer Olympics.

In the 1908 Olympics, he won a bronze medal in the team military rifle event and was 16th in 1000 yard free rifle event.
