= William Hans Press =

American businessman

- Born: 1906
- Died: 1990 (aged 83–84); Bethesda, Maryland, U.S.
- Occupation: Businessman
- Known for: Executive Vice President of the Greater Washington Board of Trade from 1941 to 1971

William Hans Press (1906 – 1990) was an American businessman and the Executive Vice President of the Greater Washington Board of Trade from 1941 to 1971.

Press was notable for being the leading Washington, D.C. figure opposing home rule for the District of Columbia. He and the board maintained opposition to home rule during his years as Executive Vice President. The board came out in favor of home rule after Press retired.

The Washington Post wrote in a 1973 article that "many people credit or blame him with almost singlehandedly defeating a home rule measure that seemed a sure thing, with President Johnson's backing, to pass the House in 1965."

Press and the board worked to promote the city's cultural and economic life. He spearheaded projects promoting employment, education and economic development. He was also a leader in promoting the lightning growth of Washington's tourism and convention industries.

He also worked with area merchants and bankers on projects to revitalize the riot corridors of 1968 and assist small merchants whose businesses had been damaged or destroyed.

Press served as president of the Historical Society of Washington, D.C. and the D.C. Society for Crippled Children. He also served on the boards of the Metropolitan Police Boys and Girls Clubs and the Consortium of Universities of the Washington Metropolitan Area. He helped organize and direct the Supreme Court Historical Society and was a founder and past president of the American Chamber of Commerce Executives. In retirement, he served as vice president and board chairman of the Historical Society of Washington, D.C. and worked as a consultant.

In 1973, Press was appointed by President Richard Nixon to a six-year term as chairman of the National Capital Planning Commission. In April 1990, during the Board of Trade's centennial celebration, he was named the board's "Man of the Years."
