= Walter Bowler =

Canadian rower

Personal information
- Nationality: Canadian
- Born: 23 August 1884
- Died: 19 March 1955 (aged 70)

Sport
- Sport: Rowing

Walter Bowler (23 August 1884 – 19 March 1955) was a Canadian rower. He competed in the men's single sculls event at the 1908 Summer Olympics.
