= Joshua Millner =

Irish sport shooter (1847–1931)

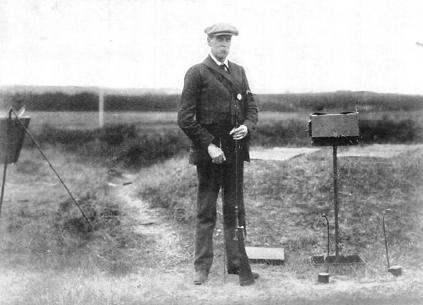
- Millner in 1908

Personal information
- Born: 5 July 1847 Dublin, Ireland
- Died: 16 November 1931 (aged 84) Rathmines, Dublin, Ireland

Sport
- Sport: Sports shooting
Medal record
Men's shooting
Representing United Kingdom
Olympic Games
Gold medal – first place	1908 London	1000 yard rifle

Joshua Kearney Millner (5 July 1847 – 16 November 1931), also referred to as Jerry Millner, was an Irish shooter who represented Great Britain and Ireland at the 1908 Summer Olympics. He won a gold medal in the Free rifle at 1000 yards. At the time, he was 61 years and 4 days old, making him one of the oldest gold medalists ever. He also finished 9th in the single-shot running deer event and 15th in the double-shot running deer event.

Miller was an officer in the 8th (Militia) Battalion of the King's Royal Rifle Corps, formerly the Carlow Rifles. He was appointed a captain on 18 August 1888, was promoted to major in early 1902, and received the honorary rank of lieutenant-colonel on 23 August 1902. Only two months later, he received the substantive rank of lieutenant-colonel as he was appointed in command of the battalion on 5 November 1902.
