= George Rennie (lacrosse) =

Canadian lacrosse player

Olympic medal record

Men's lacrosse

Representing Canada
Gold medal – first place	1908 London	Team

George Haddow Rennie (March 10, 1883 – December 13, 1966) was a Canadian lacrosse player who competed in the 1908 Summer Olympics. He was part of the Canadian team which won the gold medal.

Rennie played defenseman and turned senior in 1901 with the New Westminster Salmonbellies. He played professional lacrosse with New Westminster from 1909 to 1915 and 1918 to 1920, appearing in 120 pro games. During his professional career, he scored 18 goals and had 38 penalties (for 188 penalty minutes).

He was inducted into the Canadian Lacrosse Hall of Fame in 1966.
