= George Campbell (lacrosse) =

Canadian dentist and lacrosse player

Olympic medal record

Men's lacrosse Competitor for Canada
Gold medal – first place	1908 London	Team

Dr George Harrold "Doc" Campbell (February 1, 1878 – November 4, 1972) was a Canadian dentist and lacrosse player who competed in the 1908 Summer Olympics. In 1908, he was part of the Canadian team that won the gold medal.
