= Charles Wirgman (sport shooter) =

British sports shooter

Personal information
- Born: 22 July 1875 Wycombe, England
- Died: 6 June 1953 (aged 77) Hemingford Abbots, England

Sport
- Sport: Sports shooting

Charles Wirgman (22 July 1875 – 6 June 1953) was a British sports shooter. He competed in the 50 yard free pistol event at the 1908 Summer Olympics.
