= Charles Crowe =

Canadian sport shooter (1867–1953)

Personal information
- Born: 12 October 1867 Guelph, Ontario, Canada
- Died: 3 September 1953 (aged 85) Guelph, Ontario, Canada

Sport
- Sport: Sports shooting
Medal record
Men's shooting
Representing Canada
Olympic Games
Bronze medal – third place	1908 London	Military rifle, team

Charles Robert Crowe (12 October 1867 – 3 September 1953) was a Canadian sport shooter, who competed in the 1908 Summer Olympics. He was born and died in Guelph, Ontario.

In the 1908 Olympics, he won a bronze medal in the team military rifle event and was 9th in 1000 yard free rifle event. He is buried in Woodlawn Cemetery in Guelph, Ontario.
