= Gus Dillon =

Canadian lacrosse player

Olympic medal record

Men's lacrosse

Representing Canada
Gold medal – first place	1908 London	Team

Augustus Frederick Dillon (1881 – 19 September 1952) was a Canadian lacrosse player who competed in the 1908 Summer Olympics. He was part of the Canadian team, which won the gold medal.
