= Lou Scholes =

Canadian rower

Lewis Scholes
Personal information
- Born: 15 June 1880 Toronto, Ontario, Canada
- Died: 19 April 1942 (aged 61) Toronto, Ontario, Canada

Sport
- Sport: Rowing

Lewis Francis Scholes Sr., known as Lou Scholes (15 June 1880 – 19 April 1942), was a Canadian rower. He competed in the men's single sculls event at the 1908 Summer Olympics.

In 1904 Scholes won the Diamond Challenge Sculls (the premier singles sculls event) at the Henley Royal Regatta, rowing for Toronto RC.
