= Richard Louis Duckett =

Canadian athlete, lawyer and coroner

Richard Duckett
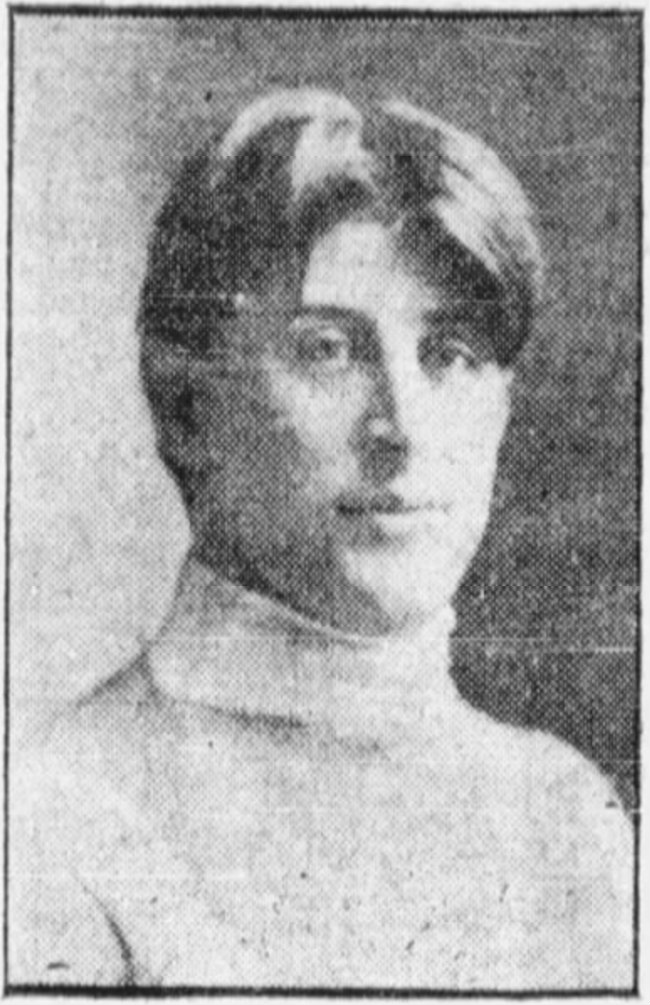
- Born: January 30, 1885 Montreal, Quebec, Canada
- Died: July 19, 1972 (aged 87) Montreal, Quebec, Canada
- Position: Defence
- Played for: Montreal Canadiens
- Playing career: 1904–1912

Olympic medal record

Men's lacrosse

Representing Canada
Gold medal – first place	1908 London	Team

Richard Louis Duckett (January 30, 1885 – July 19, 1972) was a Canadian athlete, lawyer and coroner, who held office in the judicial district of Montreal between 1937 and 1961.

== Biography ==
Born in Montreal, the eldest son of a second-generation Irish Canadian shopkeeper and a French Canadian mother, Duckett was educated at the Collège Sainte-Marie before earning a law degree at the Université Laval à Montréal in 1908.

Representing Canada as a member of the Montreal Nationals Lacrosse Club, Duckett won a gold medal at the 1908 Summer Olympics in London. In December 1909, he briefly joined the newly-formed Club Athlétique Canadien, but never played a game for the team and did not pursue an ice hockey career any further, though he remained an active lacrosse player through most of the 1910s.

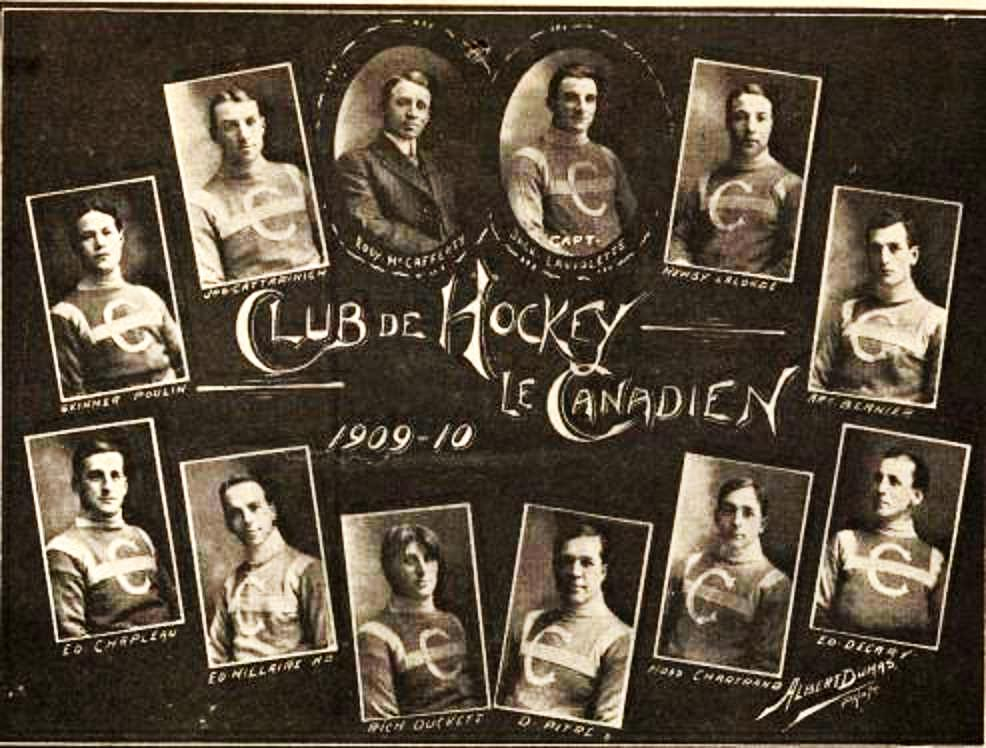
Team picture of the inaugural 1909-10 Montreal Canadiens roster: Duckett appears on the bottom row, third from left.

After ending his athletic career, he joined a Montreal legal cabinet before he was appointed coroner for the district of Montreal by the Duplessis administration in 1937, a position he occupied until his retirement in 1961.

Duckett died in Montreal in 1972 at age 87.
