= Henry Hoobin =

Canadian lacrosse player

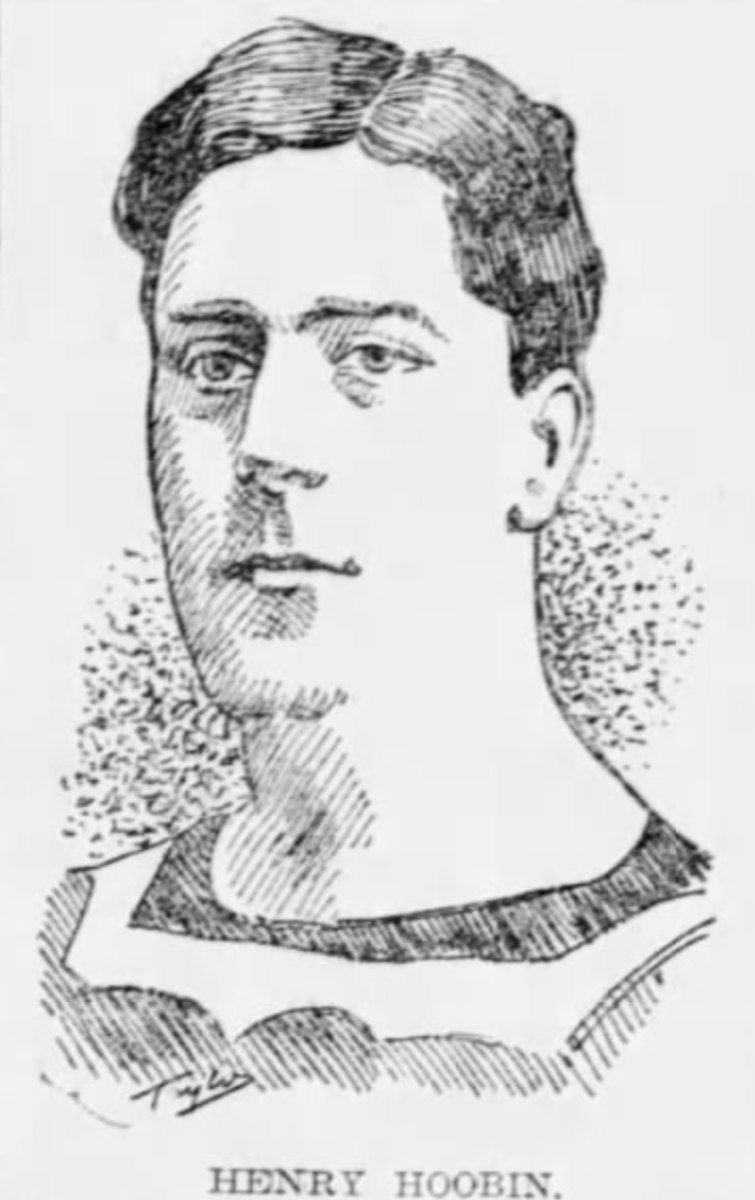
- Hoobin with the Montreal Shamrocks
- Born: February 15, 1879; Montreal, Quebec, Canada
- Died: July 20, 1921 (aged 42); Montreal, Quebec, Canada
- Occupation: Lacrosse player

Olympic medal record

Men's lacrosse

Representing Canada
Gold medal – first place	1908 London	Team

Henry Francis Hoobin (February 15, 1879 – July 20, 1921) was a Canadian lacrosse player. He was born in Montreal, Quebec, Canada.

== Early life ==
Henry's father, John Hoobin, was a member of the Shamrocks Lacrosse Club. In the late 1890s, having been taught to play the sport by his father, Henry joined his father's lacrosse team. In 1907, Henry retired from the sport due to an injured knee but returned to the game when he selected to represent Canada in lacrosse at the 1908 Summer Olympics.

== 1908 Summer Olympics ==
Henry won a gold medal against Great Britain at the 1908 Summer Olympics in London as a member of the Canadian lacrosse team. At the time he was signed for the Montreal Shamrocks in the attack wing position.
