= George Mehnert =

American wrestler (1881–1948)

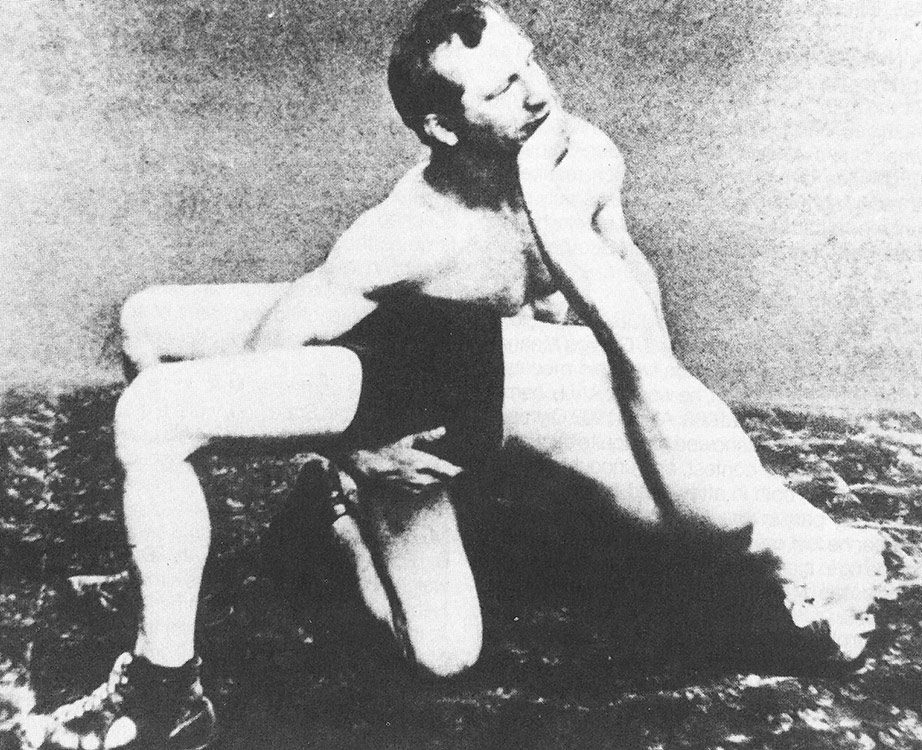
- George Mehnert (top) in 1908

Personal information
- Full name: George Nicholas Mehnert
- Born: November 3, 1881 Newark, New Jersey, U.S.
- Died: July 8, 1948 (aged 66) Newark, New Jersey, U.S.

Sport
- Country: United States
- Sport: Wrestling
- Event: Freestyle
- Club: National Turnverein
- Team: USA
Medal record
Men's freestyle wrestling
Representing the United States
Olympic Games
Gold medal – first place	1904 St. Louis	Flyweight
Gold medal – first place	1908 London	Bantamweight

George Nicholas Mehnert (November 3, 1881 – July 8, 1948) was an American wrestler who competed in the 1904 Summer Olympics and 1908 Summer Olympics, winning the gold medal at both Olympics.

At the 1904 Olympics, he won a gold medal in flyweight category. Four years later at the 1908 Olympics, he won a gold medal in freestyle bantamweight category. By winning the gold medal in 1908, Mehnert became the first American to win two Olympic gold medals in wrestling.

In 1976, Mehnert was inducted into the inaugural class of the National Wrestling Hall of Fame as a Distinguished Member.
