= Ernest Hamilton (lacrosse) =

Canadian lacrosse player

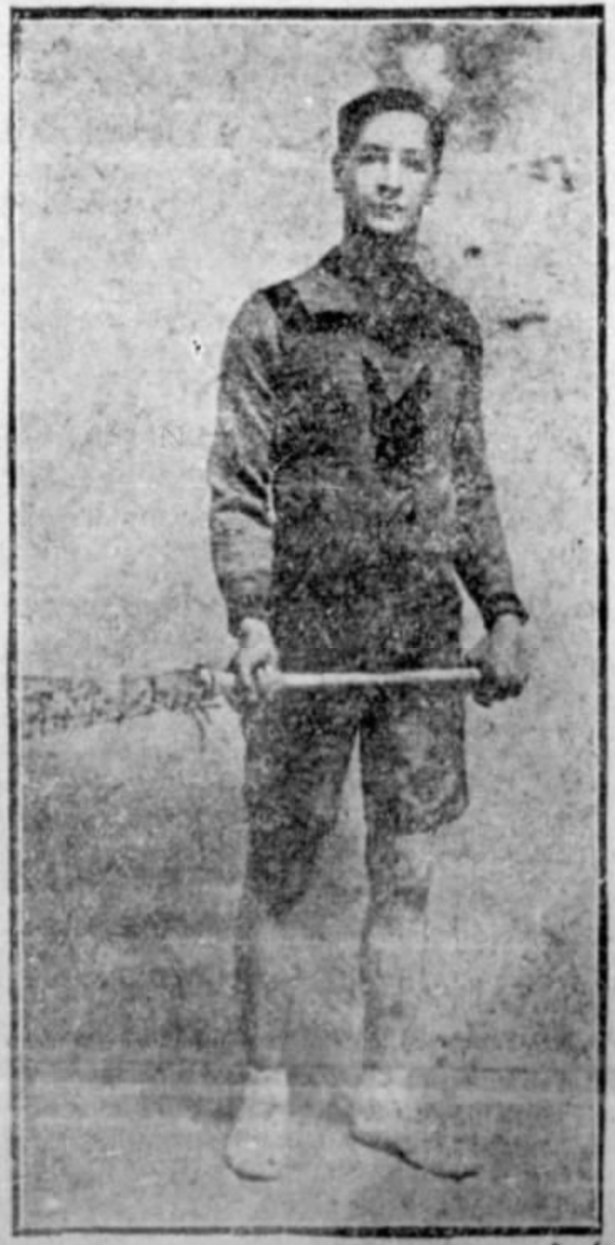
- Hamilton with the Montreal Lacrosse Club, c. 1910.
- Born: April 17, 1883; Montreal, Quebec
- Died: December 19, 1964 (aged 81)
- Known for: lacrosse

Olympic medal record

Men's lacrosse

Representing Canada
Gold medal – first place	1908 London	Team

Ernest Samuel Hamilton (April 17, 1883 – December 19, 1964) was a lacrosse player who competed in the 1908 Summer Olympics. He was part of the Canadian team which won the gold medal. He was the father of politician William McLean Hamilton.

On a club level, Hamilton represented the Montreal Lacrosse Club.

Hamilton was also involved with ice hockey, and in April 1909, he was elected president of the Montreal Hockey Club of the Montreal Amateur Athletic Association.
