= Alexander Rogers (sport shooter) =

British sport shooter (1867–1934)

Personal information
- Born: 14 April 1867 Hampstead, London, England
- Died: 19 February 1934 (aged 66) Marylebone, London, England

Sport
- Sport: Sports shooting
Medal record
Men's shooting
Representing Great Britain
Olympic Games
Bronze medal – third place	1908 London	Single-shot running deer

Alexander Elliott Rogers (14 April 1867 – 19 February 1934) was a British sport shooter, who competed at the 1908 Summer Olympics and the 1924 Summer Olympics.

In the 1908 Summer Olympics, he won a bronze medal in the single-shot running deer event, placed sixth in the double-shot running deer event, and 28th in the 1000 yard free rifle event.
