= Fred Utton =

Canadian sports shooter

Personal information
- Born: 9 April 1873 Lambeth, London, England
- Died: 23 January 1939 (aged 65) Toronto, Canada

Sport
- Sport: Sports shooting

Fred Utton (9 April 1873 – 23 January 1939) was a Canadian sports shooter. He competed in the 1000 yard free rifle event at the 1908 Summer Olympics.
