= Harry Kerr (sport shooter) =

Canadian sports shooter (1856–1936)

Personal information
- Born: 31 August 1856 Ovingham, Northumberland, England
- Died: 17 June 1936 (aged 79) Toronto, Canada

Sport
- Sport: Sports shooting
Medal record
Men's shooting
Representing Canada
Olympic Games
Bronze medal – third place	1908 London	Military rifle, team

Harry Kerr (31 August 1856 – 17 June 1936) was a Canadian sports shooter. He competed in two events at the 1908 Summer Olympics winning a bronze medal in the team military rifle event.
