= Frank Dixon (lacrosse) =

Canadian lacrosse player

Olympic medal record

Men's lacrosse

Representing Canada
Gold medal – first place	1908 London	Team

Francis Joseph Dixon (April 1, 1878 – November 29, 1932) was a Canadian lacrosse player who competed in the 1908 Summer Olympics. He was part of the Canadian team which won the gold medal.
