= William Ellicott =

British sport shooter (1856–1933)

Personal information
- Born: 1856 Launceston, Cornwall, England
- Died: 25 April 1933 (aged 76–77) Richmond, London, England

Sport
- Sport: Sports shooting
Medal record
Men's shooting
Representing Great Britain
Olympic Games
Silver medal – second place	1908 London	Team single-shot running deer
Bronze medal – third place	1908 London	Team 50y free pistol

William Ellicott (1856 – 25 April 1933) was a British sport shooter who competed at the 1908 Summer Olympics and the 1920 Summer Olympics. At the 1908 Games, he won a bronze and silver medal.
