= Shooting at the 1924 Summer Olympics – Men's trap =

Olympic shooting event

Men's trap at the Games of the VIII Olympiad
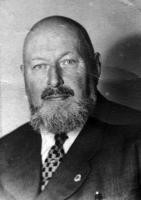
- Silver medalist Konrad Huber (1950s)
- Venue: Issy-les-Moulineaux
- Dates: 8–10 July 1924
- Competitors: 44 from 14 nations
- Winning score: 98 OR

Medalists
| 1st place, gold medalist(s) | | Gyula Halasy | Hungary |
| 2nd place, silver medalist(s) | | Konrad Huber | Finland |
| 3rd place, bronze medalist(s) | | Frank Hughes | United States |

The men's trap was a shooting sports event held as part of the Shooting at the 1924 Summer Olympics programme. It was the fifth appearance of the event. The competition was held from 8 to 10 July 1924 at the shooting ranges at Issy-les-Moulineaux. 44 shooters from 14 nations competed. A maximum of four competitors per nation were allowed. The event was won by Gyula Halasy of Hungary, a victory in the nation's debut in the event. Silver went to Konrad Huber of Finland, that nation's first medal in the men's trap. The United States, which had earned gold in 1912 and 1920, took bronze this year with Frank Hughes on the podium.

== Background ==
This was the fifth appearance of what would become standardised as the men's ISSF Olympic trap event. The event was held at every Summer Olympics from 1896 to 1924 (except 1904, when no shooting events were held) and from 1952 to 2016; it was open to women from 1968 to 1996.

Six of the shooters from the 1920 Games returned: sixth-place finisher Robert Montgomery of Canada, ninth-place finishers Albert Bosquet and Émile Dupont of Belgium, and also-competeds George Beattie of Canada (who had taken silver in the event in 1908), Samuel Vance of Canada, and Enoch Jenkins of Great Britain.

Austria, Czechoslovakia, Denmark, Hungary, Italy, and Spain each made their debut in the event. Great Britain made its fifth appearance, the only nation to have competed at each edition of the event to that point.

== Competition format ==
Shooter faced up to 100 clay pigeons over the course of four stages. Two shots were allowed per clay pigeon.

The first stage consisted of 20 targets. The second stage had 30 targets again. The third stage had 50 targets, in two series of 20 and one series of 10. Each of the stages used a known-trap, unknown-angle format.

== Records ==
Prior to this competition, the existing world and Olympic records were as follows.

| World record | | | | |
| Olympic record | James Graham (USA) | 96 | Stockholm, Sweden | 2–4 July 1912 |

Gyula Halasy and Konrad Huber tied at 98 for a new Olympic record; Frank Hughes and Robert Montgomery also exceeded the old record, while four shooters matched it.

== Schedule ==
| Date | Time | Round |
|---|---|---|
| Tuesday, 8 July 1924; Wednesday, 9 July 1924; Thursday, 10 July 1924 | | First stage Second stage Final stage |

== Results ==
The event consisted of two rounds on two consecutive days. In each round every competitor had 50 shots.

The results of the competitors which were eliminated first are unknown. They are listed in the order as they appear in the official report.

There was an extra, shoot-out round for Halasy and Huber to determine the gold medal. In this extra round both competitors had 10 shots. Halasy scored 10, while Huber scored 9. There was also a shoot-off for bronze, won by Hughes.

| Rank | Shooter | Nation | Total |
|---|---|---|---|
| 1st place, gold medalist(s) | Gyula Halasy | Hungary | 98 |
| 2nd place, silver medalist(s) | Konrad Huber | Finland | 98 |
| 3rd place, bronze medalist(s) | Frank Hughes | United States | 97 |
| 4 | Robert Montgomery | Canada | 97 |
| 5 | Louis D'Heur | Belgium | 96 |
| 6 | Samuel Vance | Canada | 96 |
| 6 | George Beattie | Canada | 96 |
| 6 | Samuel Sharman | United States | 96 |
| 9 | Heinrich Bartosch | Austria | 95 |
| 9 | Louis Deloy | France | 95 |
| 11 | Werner Ekman | Finland | 94 |
| 11 | Ole Lilloe-Olsen | Norway | 94 |
| 11 | Enoch Jenkins | Great Britain | 94 |
| 14 | Hans Schödl | Austria | 93 |
| 14 | Fredric Landelius | Sweden | 93 |
| 16 | Axel Ekblom | Sweden | 92 |
| 16 | Oluf Wesmann-Kjær | Norway | 92 |
| 18 | Wilford Fawcett | United States | 91 |
| 19 | Eivind Holmsen | Norway | 90 |
| 19 | Martin Stenersen | Norway | 90 |
| 19 | Gusztáv Szomjas | Hungary | 90 |
| 19 | László Szomjas | Hungary | 90 |
| 19 | Giacomo Serra | Italy | 90 |
| 24 | Fred Etchen | United States | 89 |
| 24 | Georg Nordblad | Finland | 89 |
| 24 | John O'Leary | Great Britain | 89 |
| 24 | Erik Lundquist | Sweden | 89 |
| 24 | Erich Zoigner | Austria | 89 |
| 29 | August Baumgartner | Austria | 88 |
| 29 | Magnus Hallman | Sweden | 88 |
| — | Albert Bosquet | Belgium | unknown |
| — | Émile Dupont | Belgium | unknown |
| — | Louis Van Tilt | Belgium | unknown |
| — | Hans Jacobsen | Denmark | unknown |
| — | José María de Palleja | Spain | unknown |
| — | Toivo Tikkanen | Finland | unknown |
| — | Jacques d'Imecourt | France | unknown |
| — | Cyril Mackworth-Praed | Great Britain | unknown |
| — | Sándor Lumniczer | Hungary | unknown |
| — | Nicola Rebisso | Italy | unknown |
| — | Giacomo Rossi | Italy | unknown |
| — | Kurt Riedl | Czechoslovakia | unknown |
| — | František Schuster | Czechoslovakia | unknown |
| — | Antonín Siegl | Czechoslovakia | unknown |
