= Shooting at the 1924 Summer Olympics – Men's team trap =

Sports shooting at the Olympics

Men's team clay pigeons at the Games of the VIII Olympiad
- Venue: Issy-les-Moulineaux
- Dates: 6–7 July 1924
- Competitors: 69 from 12 nations

Medalists
1st place, gold medalist(s)		Frederick Etchen, Frank Hughes, John Noel, Clarence Platt, Samuel Sharman, William Silkworth; United States
2nd place, silver medalist(s)		William Barnes, George Beattie, John Black, Robert Montgomery, Samuel Newton, Samuel Vance; Canada
3rd place, bronze medalist(s)		Werner Ekman, Konrad Huber, Robert Huber, Georg Nordblad, Toivo Tikkanen, Magnus Wegelius; Finland

The men's team clay pigeons was a shooting sports event held as part of the Shooting at the 1924 Summer Olympics programme. It was the fourth appearance of the event. The competition was held on 6 and 7 July 1924 at the shooting ranges at Issy-les-Moulineaux. 69 shooters from 12 nations competed.

Note: The International Olympic Committee medal database shows all six team members as medalists. The shooters in italics were the weakest of their teams and their scores did not count for the team score.

== Results ==
A maximum of six competitors per nation were allowed. The scores of the best four shooters on each team were summed to give a team score.

Place	Shooter	Total	
Place	Shooter	Score	Rank
1
1	United States	363	
1	Frank Hughes	92	3
1	Samuel Sharman	92	3
1	William Silkworth	90	12
1	Frederick Etchen	89	14
1	John Noel	87	20
1	Clarence Platt	74	59
2
2	Canada	360	
2	George Beattie	92	3
2	Robert Montgomery	92	3
2	Samuel Vance	89	14
2	John Black	87	20
2	William Barnes	85	26
2	Samuel Newton	73	62
3
3	Finland	360	
3	Konrad Huber	94	1
3	Robert Huber	92	3
3	Werner Ekman	91	9
3	Toivo Tikkanen	83	34
3	Georg Nordblad	80	43
3	Magnus Wegelius	79	46
4
4	Belgium	354	
4	Louis D'Heur	91	9
4	Albert Bosquet	91	9
4	Émile Dupont	86	22
4	Jacques Mouton	86	22
4	Louis Van Tilt	86	22
4	Henri Quersin	78	48
5
5	Sweden	354	
5	Erik Lundquist	92	3
5	Fredric Landelius	90	12
5	Alfred Swahn	88	19
5	Magnus Hallman	84	30
5	Karl Richter	84	30
5	Axel Ekblom	81	39
6
6	Austria	347	
6	Heinrich Bartosch	93	2
6	August Baumgartner	89	14
6	Hans Schödl	84	30
6	Erich Zoigner	81	39
6	Franz Hollitzer	78	48
6	Friedrich Dietz von Weidenberg	77	51
7
7	Norway	336	
7	Ole Lilloe-Olsen	89	14
7	Oluf Wesmann-Kjær	85	26
7	Eivind Holmsen	82	37
7	Martin Stenersen	80	43
7	Harald Natvig	61	68
8
8	Great Britain	328	
8	John O'Leary	85	26
8	Enoch Jenkins	82	37
8	Hans Larsen	81	39
8	Cyril Mackworth-Praed	80	43
8	George Neal	77	51
8	William Grosvenor	74	59
9
9	Italy	324	
9	Giacomo Rossi	89	14
9	Giacomo Serra	85	26
9	Federico Cesarano	75	55
9	Salvatore Lucchesi	75	55
9	Nicola Rebisso	74	59
9	Giuseppe Bellotto	73	62
10
10	Hungary	321	
10	Sándor Lumniczer	86	22
10	László Szomjas	84	30
10	Gyula Halasy	78	48
10	Gusztáv Szomjas	73	62
11
11	France	320	
11	Louis Deloy	83	34
11	Jean de Beaumont	81	39
11	Manuel de Lambertye	79	46
11	Louis de Bourbon-Busset	77	51
11	Georges de Bordus	72	65
11	René Texier	40	69
12
12	Czechoslovakia	309	
12	Kurt Riedl	83	34
12	Bruno Frank	76	54
12	Antonín Jílek	75	55
12	Antonín Siegl	75	55
12	Richard Klier	71	66
12	Pavel Mach	66	67
