= George Neal =

George Neal may refer to:

- George Neal (sport shooter), British sport shooter
- George Neal (baseball), American Negro league infielder and manager
- George M. Neal, United States Navy officer
  - USS George M. Neal, a planned Arleigh Burke-class guided missile destroyer
- George Neal South Power Plant, a coal-fired power plant in Iowa

== See also ==
- George Neale, English first-class cricketer and British Army officer
