= List of Summer Olympics venues: L =

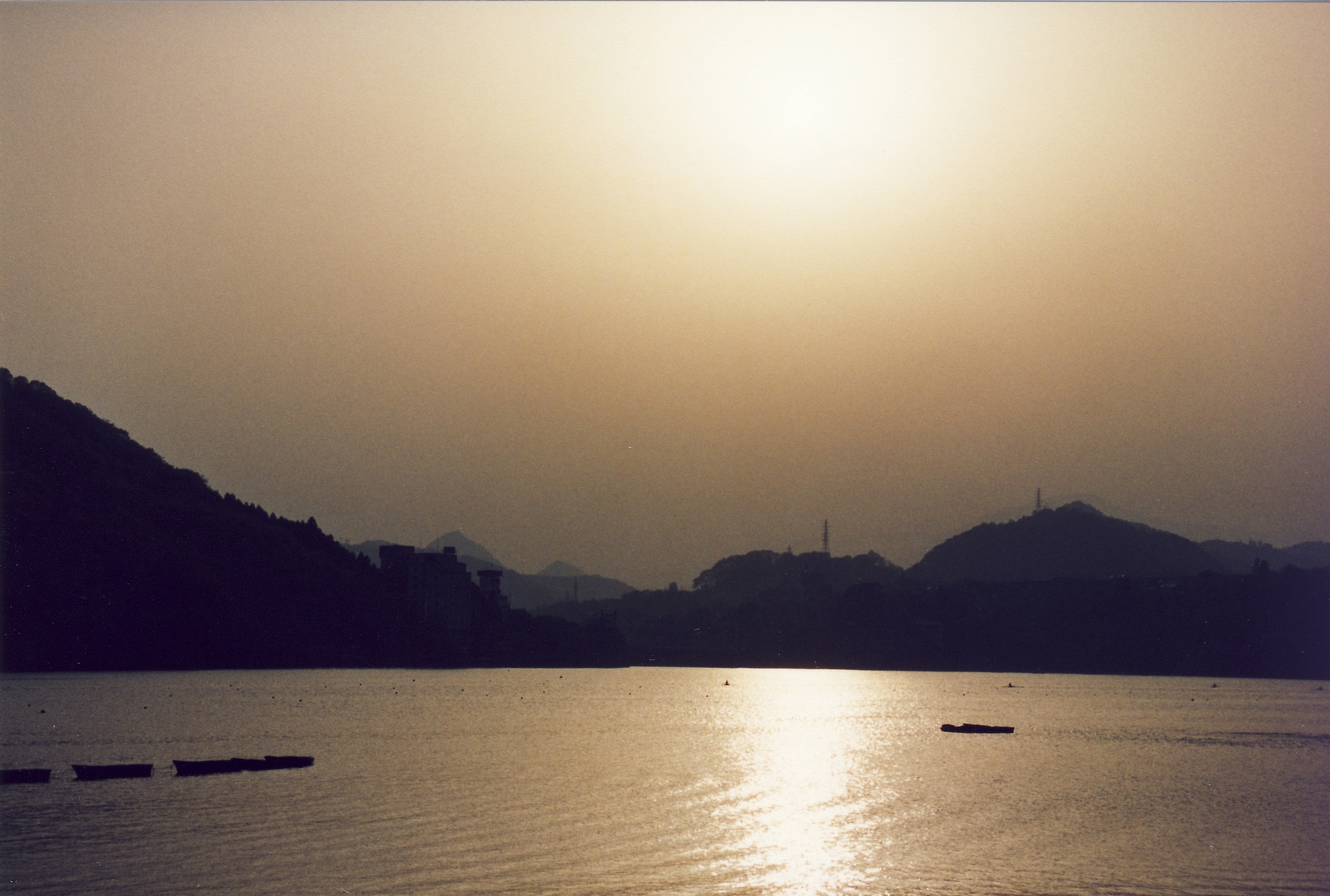
Lake Sagami in 2007. The lake hosted the canoeing events for the 1964 Summer Olympics in Tokyo.

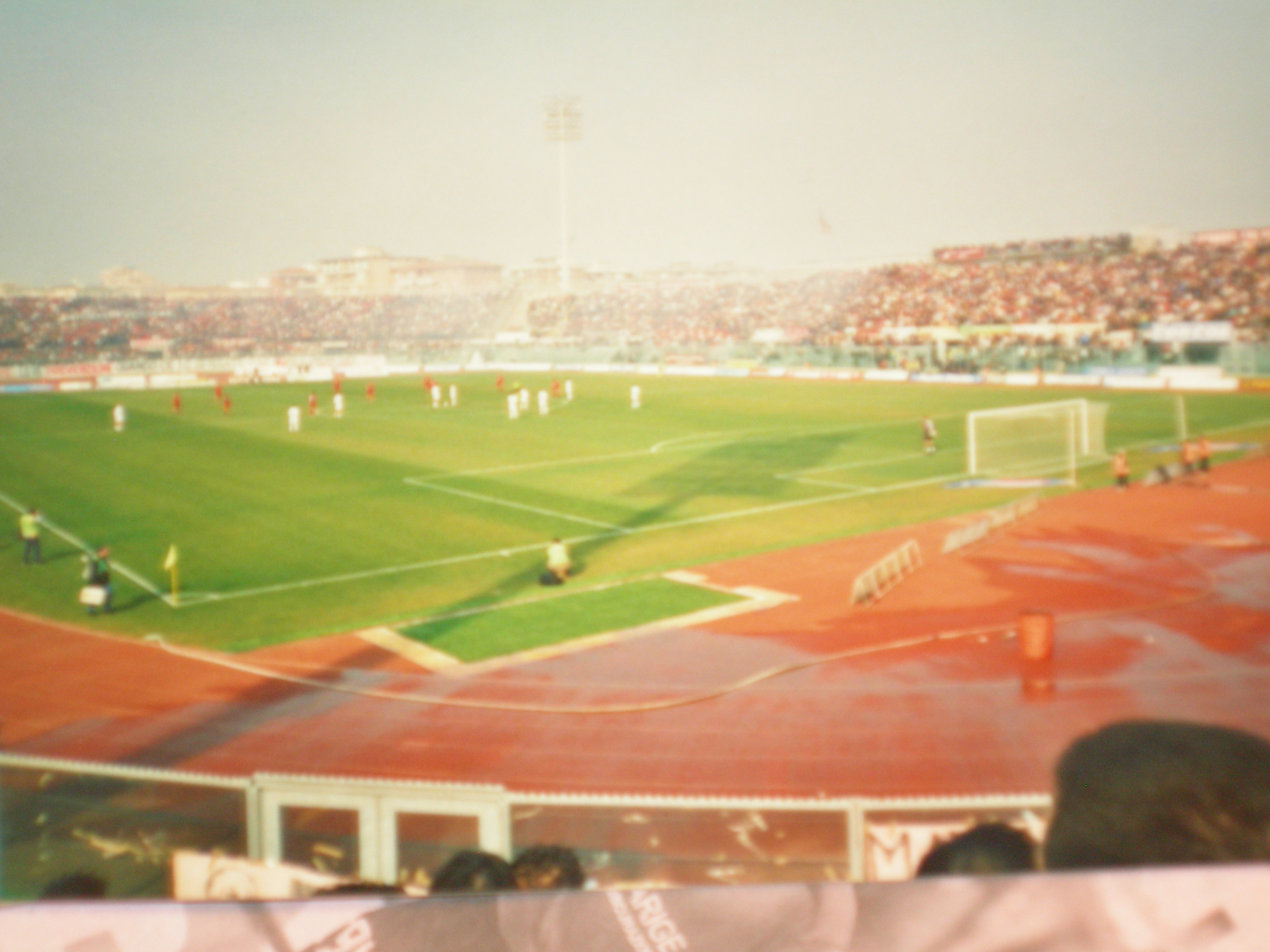
Livorno Ardenza Stadium hosted some of the football matches for the 1960 Summer Olympics in Rome.

For the Summer Olympics, there were a total of 45 venues that started with the letter 'L'.

| Venue | Games | Sports | Capacity | Ref. |
|---|---|---|---|---|
| La Romareda | 1992 Barcelona | Football | 43,000 | |
| Laakso | 1952 Helsinki | Equestrian (eventing - riding) | 12,500 | |
| Lagoa Rodrigo de Freitas | 2016 Rio de Janeiro | Canoeing (sprint), Rowing | 14,000 | |
| Lahti | 1952 Helsinki | Football | 82,000 | |
| Lake Albano | 1960 Rome | Canoeing, Rowing | 10,000 | |
| Lake Casitas | 1984 Los Angeles | Canoeing, Rowing | 4,680 | |
| Lake Lanier | 1996 Atlanta | Canoeing (sprint), Rowing | 17,300 | |
| Lake Sagami | 1964 Tokyo | Canoeing | 1,500 | |
| Lake Wendouree | 1956 Melbourne | Canoeing, Rowing | 14,300 | |
| Lansdowne Park | 1976 Montreal | Football | 30,000 | |
| Laoshan Bicycle Moto Cross (BMX) Venue | 2008 Beijing | Cycling (BMX) | 4,000 | |
| Laoshan Mountain Bike Course | 2008 Beijing | Cycling (Mountain Bike) | 2,000 | |
| Laoshan Velodrome | 2008 Beijing | Cycling (track) | 6,000 | |
| L'Aquila Communal Stadium | 1960 Rome | Football | 9,285 | |
| Lazio Pigeon Shooting Stand | 1960 Rome | Shooting (shotgun trap) | 2,000 | |
| Le Havre | 1900 Paris | Sailing | Not listed. | |
| Le Havre | 1924 Paris | Sailing | 541 | |
| Le Stade Olympique Reims | 1924 Paris | Shooting (trap shooting, running target) | 420 | |
| Le Stand de Tir de Versailles | 1924 Paris | Modern pentathlon (shooting), Shooting (25 m rapid fire pistol, running deer) | 82 | |
| Lee Valley White Water Centre | 2012 London | Canoeing (slalom) | 12,000 maximum | |
| Legion Field | 1996 Atlanta | Football | 81,700 | |
| L'Hospitalet de Llobrecht Baseball Stadium | 1992 Barcelona | Baseball (final) | 7,000 | |
| Liljeholmen | 1912 Stockholm | Cycling, Equestrian | Not listed. | |
| Lill-Jansskogen | 1956 Stockholm | Equestrian (eventing) | Not listed. | |
| Lindarängen | 1912 Stockholm | Equestrian (eventing steeplechase) | Not listed. | |
| Liuskasaari | 1952 Helsinki | Sailing | 19,000 | |
| Livorno Ardenza Stadium | 1960 Rome | Football | 19,238 | |
| London Velodrome | 2012 London | Cycling (track) | 6,000 | |
| Long Beach Arena | 1984 Los Angeles | Volleyball | 12,000 | |
| Long Beach Convention Center | 1984 Los Angeles | Fencing | 2,500 | |
| Long Beach Marine Stadium | 1932 Los Angeles | Rowing | 17,000 | |
| Long Beach Shoreline Marina | 1984 Los Angeles | Sailing | Not listed. | |
| Lord's Cricket Ground | 2012 London | Archery | 6,500 (temporary) | |
| Los Angeles Avenue | 1932 Los Angeles | Cycling (road) | Not listed. | |
| Los Angeles Harbor | 1932 Los Angeles | Sailing | Not listed. | |
| Los Angeles Memorial Coliseum | 1984 Los Angeles | Athletics, Ceremonies (opening/ closing) | 92,516 | |
| Los Angeles Memorial Coliseum | 2028 Los Angeles | Athletics, Ceremonies (opening/ closing) | 77,500 | |
| Los Angeles Memorial Sports Arena | 1984 Los Angeles | Boxing | 15,700 | |
| Los Angeles Police Pistol Range | 1932 Los Angeles | Modern pentathlon (shooting) Shooting | Not listed. | |
| Lyons' Sports Club | 1948 London | Field hockey | Not listed. | |
