= Samuel Vance =

Samuel Vance may refer to:

- Samuel B. H. Vance (1814–1890), New York City politician
- Samuel Vance (sport shooter) (1881–1976), Canadian Olympic sport shooter
