= Bartosch =

Bartosch is a surname. Notable people with the surname include:

- Berthold Bartosch (1893–1968), German animator
- Dave Bartosch (1917–2006), American baseball player
- Heinrich Bartosch, Austrian sport shooter

== See also ==
- Carin Bartosch Edström (born 1965), Swedish classical composer and writer
