= Samuel Newton =

Samuel Newton may refer to:

- Samuel B. Newton (1868–1932), American college football coach
- Samuel Newton (sport shooter) (1881–1944), Olympic competitor from Canada
- Samuel Newton (clergyman), 18th century clergyman in England, see William Godwin
