= André Fleury =

André Fleury may refer to:

- André Fleury (organist) (1903–1995), French composer, pianist, organist, and pedagogue
- André Fleury (sport shooter) (1882–?), French Olympic sports shooter
- André-Hercule de Fleury (1653–1743), French chief minister under Louis XV of France
