= Shooting at the 1920 Summer Olympics – Men's team trap =

Men's team trap at the Games of the VII Olympiad
- Venue: Hoogboom Military Camp
- Date: 22–23 July 1920
- Competitors: 48 from 8 nations

Medalists
1st place, gold medalist(s)		Mark Arie, Horace Bonser, Jay Clark, Forest McNeir, Frank Troeh, Frank Wright; United States
2nd place, silver medalist(s)		Albert Bosquet, Joseph Cogels, Émile Dupont, Edouard Fesinger, Henri Quersin, Louis Van Tilt; Belgium
3rd place, bronze medalist(s)		Per Kinde, Fredric Landelius, Erik Lundquist, Karl Richter, Erik Sökjer-Petersén, Alfred Swahn; Sweden

The men's team clay pigeons was a shooting sports event held as part of the Shooting at the 1920 Summer Olympics programme. It was the third appearance of the event. The competition was held on 22 and 23 July 1920. 48 shooters from eight nations competed.

The International Olympic Committee medal database shows Frederick Plum as medalist for the United States but he did not compete in this event. The correct medalist is Jay Clark.

== Results ==
The maximum was 600. The first five teams qualified for the final.

Place	Shooter	Score
1
1	United States	547
1	Mark Arie	94
1	Frank Troeh	94
1	Horace Bonser	93
1	Forest McNeir	93
1	Frank Wright	89
1	Jay Clark	84
2
2	Belgium	503
2	Albert Bosquet	91
2	Joseph Cogels	
2	Émile Dupont	
2	Henri Quersin	
2	Louis Van Tilt	
2	Edouard Fesinger	
3
3	Sweden	500
3	Erik Lundquist	90
3	Per Kinde	86
3	Fredric Landelius	86
3	Alfred Swahn	84
3	Karl Richter	81
3	Erik Sökjer-Petersén	73
4
4	Great Britain	488
4	Harold Humby	
4	William Grosvenor	
4	William Ellicott	
4	George Whitaker	
4	Ernest Pocock	
4	Charles Palmer	
5
5	Canada	474
5	George Beattie	87
5	Samuel Vance	82
5	William Hamilton	81
5	Robert Montgomery	78
5	True Oliver	76
5	William McLaren	70
6
6	Netherlands	222
6	Reindert de Favauge	
6	Cornelis van der Vliet	
6	Pieter Waller	
6	Emile Jurgens	
6	Franciscus Jurgens	
6	Eduardus van Voorst tot Voorst	
7
7	Norway	210
7	Oluf Wesmann-Kjær	
7	Nordal Lunde	
7	Harald Natvig	
7	Thorstein Johansen	
7	Hans Nordvik	
7	Ole Lilloe-Olsen	
7	France	210
7	André Fleury	
7	Marcel Lafitte	
7	Henri de Castex	
7	Augustin Berjat	
7	René Texier	
7	Jean Lareinty-Tholozan	
