= Hans Larsen =

British sports shooter

Personal information
- Born: 16 January 1873 Gladsaxe, Denmark
- Died: March 1952 (aged 79) London, England

Sport
- Sport: Sports shooting

Hans Viggo Larsen (16 January 1873 – March 1952) was a British sports shooter. He competed in the team clay pigeon event at the 1924 Summer Olympics.
