= Mark Arie =

American sport shooter

Personal information
- Born: March 27, 1882 Thomasboro, Illinois, United States
- Died: November 19, 1958 (aged 76) Champaign, Illinois, United States

Sport
- Sport: Sport shooting
Medal record
Men's shooting
Representing United States
Olympic Games
Gold medal – first place	1920 Antwerp	Trap
Gold medal – first place	1920 Antwerp	Team clay pigeons

Mark Peter Arie (March 27, 1882 – November 19, 1958) was an American sport shooter who competed in the 1920 Summer Olympics in Antwerp, Belgium. He won a gold medal in the trap shooting and also in the team clay pigeons.
