= Erik Lundquist =

Swedish sport shooter

Personal information
- Born: 29 April 1896 Stockholm, Sweden
- Died: 20 August 1961 (aged 65) Stockholm, Sweden

Sport
- Sport: Sports shooting
Medal record
Men's shooting
Representing Sweden
Olympic Games
Bronze medal – third place	1920 Antwerp	team clay pigeons

Erik Rudolf Gabriel Lundquist (29 April 1896 – 20 August 1961) was a Swedish sport shooter who competed in the 1920 Summer Olympics and in the 1924 Summer Olympics. In 1920 he won the bronze medal as member of the Swedish team in the team clay pigeons competition. He also participated in the individual trap event, but his result is unknown. Four years later, he finished fifth with the Swedish team in the team clay pigeons competition. In the individual trap event, he finished 24th.
