= Thomasboro, Illinois =

Thomasboro
- Village
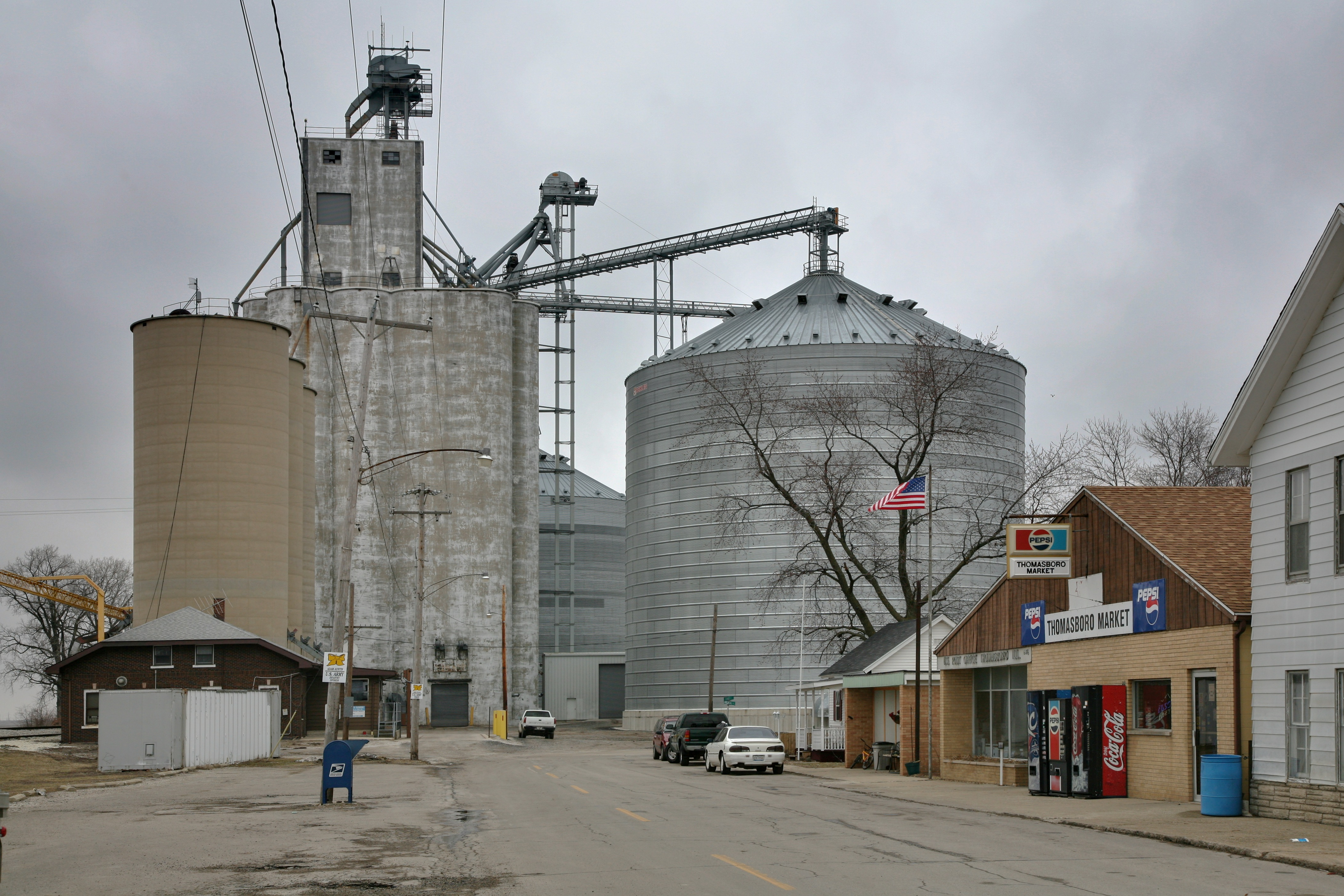
- Thomasboro Illinois

- Location of Thomasboro in Champaign County, Illinois.

- Location within Champaign County Thomasboro (Illinois)
- Coordinates: 40°14′31″N 88°11′16″W
- Country: United States
- State: Illinois
- County: Champaign
- Founded: 1864

Area
  - Total: 1.00 sq mi (2.59 km^{2})
  - Land: 1.00 sq mi (2.59 km^{2})
  - Water: 0 sq mi (0.00 km^{2})
- Elevation: 735 ft (224 m)

Population (2020)
  - Total: 1,034
  - Density: 1,033.8/sq mi (399.14/km^{2})
- Time zone: UTC-6 (CST)
  - Summer (DST): UTC-5 (CDT)
- Zip code: 61878
- Area code: 217
- FIPS code: 17-75107
- GNIS feature ID: 2399971
- Website: thomasboro.us

Thomasboro is a village in Champaign County, Illinois, United States. The population was 1,034 at the 2020 census.

The village has the name of John Thomas, a pioneer settler.

== Geography ==
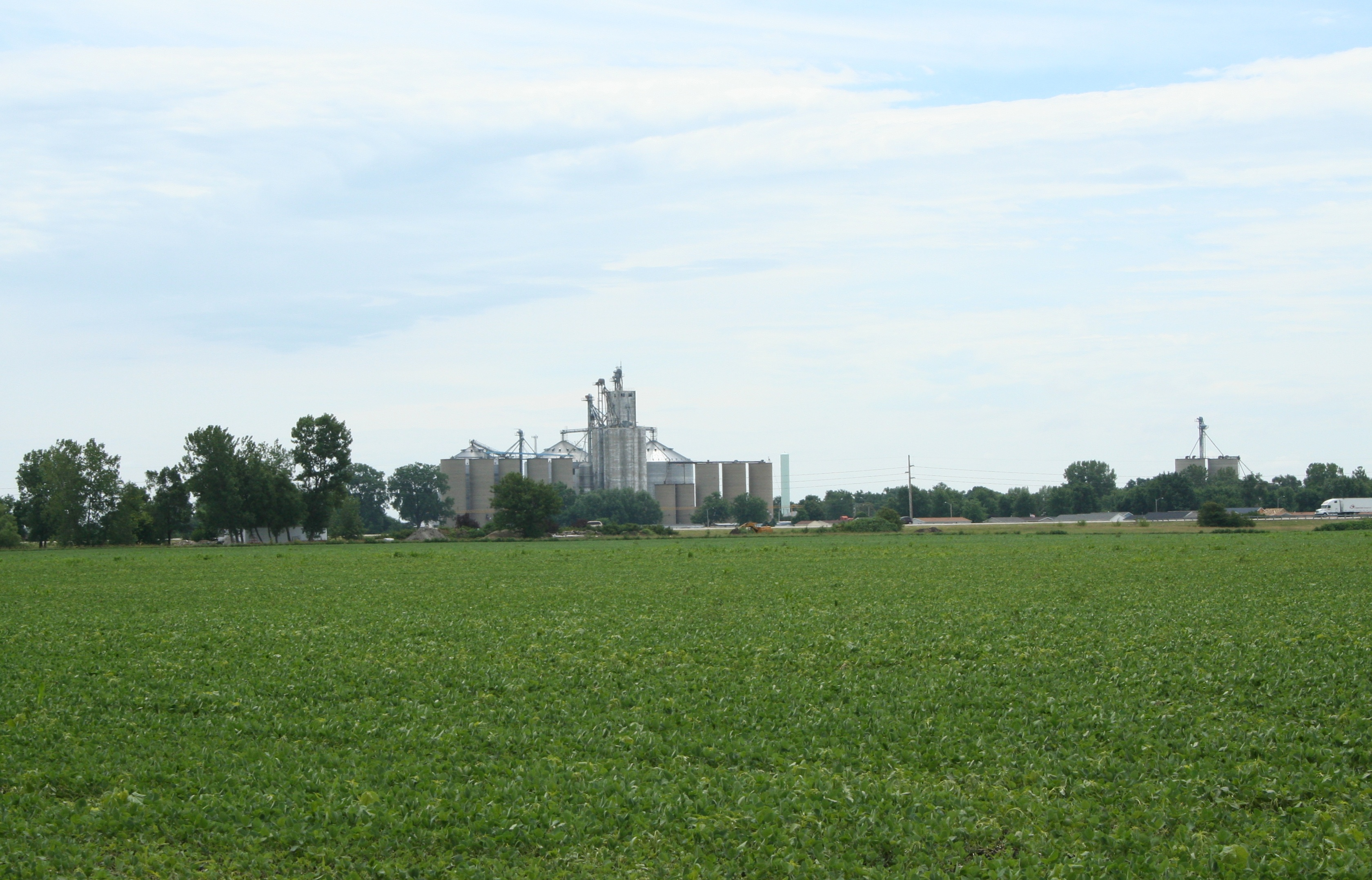
Thomasboro Illinois grain elevators.

According to the 2021 census gazetteer files, Thomasboro has a total area of 1.00 square mile (2.59 km^{2}), all land.

== Demographics ==
Historical population
Census	Pop.	Note	%±
1880	121		—
1910	321		—
1920	261		−18.7%
1930	308		18.0%
1940	285		−7.5%
1950	330		15.8%
1960	458		38.8%
1970	806		76.0%
1980	1,242		54.1%
1990	1,250		0.6%
2000	1,233		−1.4%
2010	1,126		−8.7%
2020	1,034		−8.2%
U.S. Decennial Census

=== 2020 census ===
As of the 2020 census, Thomasboro had a population of 1,034 people and 300 families residing in the village. The population density was 1,034.00 inhabitants per square mile (399.23/km^{2}), and there were 530 housing units at an average density of 530.00 per square mile (204.63/km^{2}).

The median age was 43.3 years. Residents under age 18 made up 17.8% of the population, and those age 65 or older made up 21.2%. For every 100 females, there were 95.5 males; among adults age 18 and over, there were 93.6 males for every 100 females.

Of the village population, 99.0% lived in urban areas and 1.0% lived in rural areas.

There were 483 households, of which 20.5% had children under the age of 18 living in them. Of all households, 39.1% were married-couple households, 20.5% were households with a male householder and no spouse or partner present, and 28.2% were households with a female householder and no spouse or partner present. About 32.5% of all households were made up of individuals, and 13.7% had someone living alone who was 65 years of age or older. The average household size was 2.73 and the average family size was 2.29.

There were 530 housing units, of which 8.9% were vacant. The homeowner vacancy rate was 4.2% and the rental vacancy rate was 10.1%.

Racial composition as of the 2020 census
Race	Number	Percent
White	947	91.6%
Black or African American	18	1.7%
American Indian and Alaska Native	1	0.1%
Asian	1	0.1%
Native Hawaiian and Other Pacific Islander	0	0.0%
Some other race	16	1.5%
Two or more races	51	4.9%
Hispanic or Latino (of any race)	49	4.7%

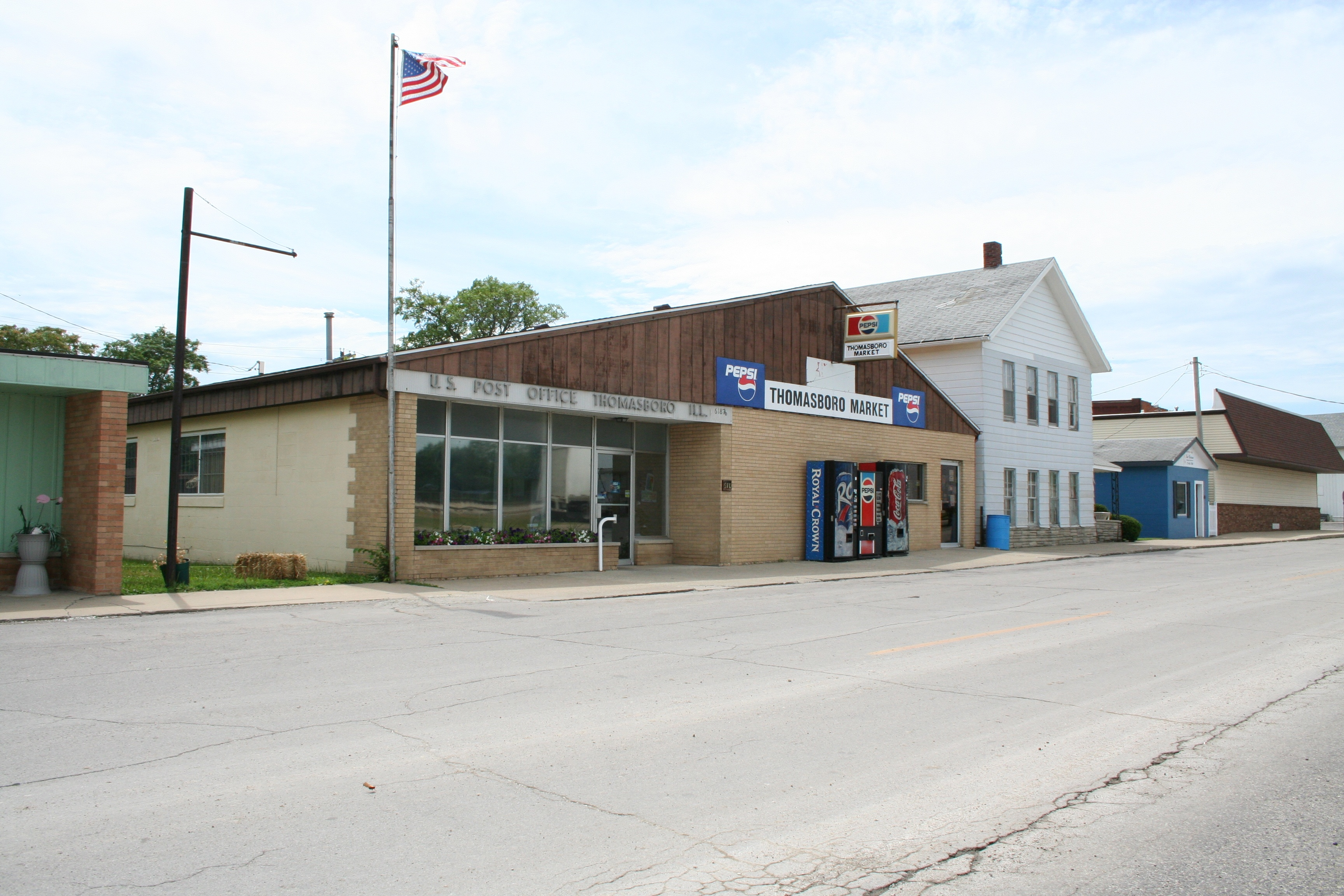
Thomasboro Illinois Post Office.

=== Income and poverty ===
The median income for a household in the village was $55,795, and the median income for a family was $82,917. Males had a median income of $40,019 versus $36,369 for females. The per capita income for the village was $35,869. About 9.7% of families and 11.3% of the population were below the poverty line, including 32.3% of those under age 18 and none of those age 65 or over.

== Education ==
It is in the Thomasboro Community Consolidated School District 130 and the Rantoul Township High School District 193.

== Notable people ==
- Mark Arie, winner of two 1920 Summer Olympics gold medals in shooting, was born in Thomasboro.
