= Franz Hollitzer =

Austrian sports shooter

Personal information
- Born: 1878
- Died: Unknown

Sport
- Sport: Sports shooting

Franz Hollitzer (born 1878, date of death unknown) was an Austrian sports shooter. He competed in the team clay pigeon event at the 1924 Summer Olympics.
