= José María de Palleja =

Spanish sports shooter

Personal information
- Born: 17 June 1891 Barcelona, Spain
- Died: 24 January 1964 (aged 72)

Sport
- Sport: Sports shooting

José María de Palleja (17 June 1891 – 24 January 1964) was a Spanish sports shooter. He competed in the trap event at the 1924 Summer Olympics.
