= Giuseppe Bellotto =

Italian sports shooter

Personal information
- Born: 1881
- Died: Unknown

Sport
- Sport: Sports shooting

Giuseppe Bellotto (born 1881, date of death unknown) was an Italian sports shooter. He competed in the team clay pigeon event at the 1924 Summer Olympics.
