= Eivind Holmsen =

Norwegian sports shooter (1894–1990)

Personal information
- Born: 5 July 1894 Berg, Østfold, Norway
- Died: 22 March 1990 (aged 95) Moss, Norway

Sport
- Sport: Sports shooting

Eivind Holmsen (5 July 1894 – 22 March 1990) was a Norwegian shooter who competed in the early 20th century in rifle shooting.

He was born in Berg, Østfold. At the 1924 Summer Olympics in Paris, he finished nineteenth in the trap event and seventh in the team trap event.

He died in 1990 in Moss.
