= Cornelis van der Vliet =

Dutch sports shooter

Personal information
- Born: 18 December 1880 Bloemendaal, Netherlands
- Died: 16 December 1960 (aged 79) Bloemendaal, Netherlands

Sport
- Sport: Sports shooting

Cornelis van der Vliet (18 December 1880 – 16 December 1960) was a Dutch sports shooter. He competed in the team clay pigeon event at the 1920 Summer Olympics.
