= Georges de Bordus =

French sports shooter

Sport
- Sport: Sports shooting

Georges de Bordus was a French sports shooter. He competed in the team clay pigeon event at the 1924 Summer Olympics.
