= Edouard Fesinger =

Belgian sport shooter

Personal information
- Born: 9 January 1874 Antwerp, Belgium
- Died: 8 December 1921 (aged 47) Antwerp, Belgium

Sport
- Sport: Sports shooting
Medal record
Men's shooting
Representing Belgium
Olympic Games
Silver medal – second place	1920 Antwerp	team clay pigeons

Edouard Fesinger was a Belgian sport shooter. Competing for Belgium, he won a silver medal in team clay pigeons at the 1920 Summer Olympics in Antwerp.
