= Oluf Wesmann-Kjær =

Norwegian sport shooter (1874–1945)

Personal information
- Born: 2 July 1874 Nannestad, Norway
- Died: 16 September 1945 (aged 71) Oslo, Denmark

Sport
- Sport: Sports shooting

Oluf Wesmann-Kjær (2 July 1874 – 16 September 1945) was a Norwegian shooter who competed in the early 20th century in rifle shooting.

He was born in Nannestad. At the 1920 Summer Olympics he competed in the 50 metre free pistol event, and finished seventh in the team clay pigeons event. At the 1924 Summer Olympics he finished thirteenth in the 100 metre running deer, double shots event, sixteenth in the trap event and seventh in the team clay pigeons event.

He died in 1945 in Oslo.
