= Ernest Pocock =

British sports shooter

Personal information
- Born: 23 October 1878
- Died: 28 July 1951 (aged 72)

Sport
- Sport: Sports shooting

Ernest Pocock (23 October 1878 – 28 July 1951) was a British sports shooter. He competed in the team clay pigeon event at the 1920 Summer Olympics.
