= Joseph Cogels =

Belgian sport shooter

Personal information
- Born: 19 December 1882 Schoten
- Died: 26 September 1954 (aged 71) Ossendrecht

Sport
- Sport: Sports shooting
Medal record
Men's shooting
Representing Belgium
Olympic Games
Silver medal – second place	1920 Antwerp	team clay pigeons

Joseph Marie Cogels (19 December 1882 – 26 September 1954) was a Belgian sport shooter who competed in the 1920 Summer Olympics. In 1920, he won the silver medal as a member of the Belgian team in the team clay pigeons competition.
