= Louis Van Tilt =

Belgian sports shooter (1875–1942)

Personal information
- Born: 28 March 1875
- Died: 3 August 1942 (aged 67)

Sport
- Sport: Sports shooting
Medal record
Men's shooting
Representing Belgium
Olympic Games
Silver medal – second place	1920 Antwerp	team clay pigeons

Louis Pierre Paul Van Tilt (28 March 1875 – 3 August 1942) was a Belgian sport shooter who competed in the 1920 Summer Olympics and in the 1924 Summer Olympics.

In 1920, he won the silver medal as a member of the Belgian team in the team clay pigeons competition. Four years later, he was part of the Belgian team which finished fourth in the team clay pigeons competition. He also participated in the individual trap event but his result is unknown.
