= Franciscus Jurgens =

Dutch sports shooter

Personal information
- Born: 29 January 1869 Oss, Netherlands
- Died: 26 March 1941 (aged 72) Nijmegen, Netherlands

Sport
- Sport: Sports shooting

Franciscus Jurgens (29 January 1869 – 26 March 1941) was a Dutch sports shooter. He competed in the team clay pigeon event at the 1920 Summer Olympics. His younger brother Emile Jurgens also competed for the Netherlands in shooting at the 1912 and 1920 Summer Olympics.
