= Forest McNeir =

American sport shooter (1875–1957)

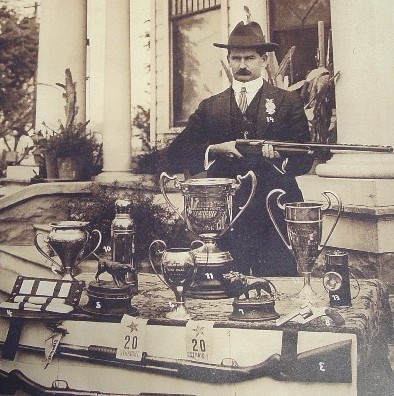
- McNeir with some of his trophies.

Personal information
- Born: August 16, 1875 Washington, D.C., United States
- Died: May 9, 1957 (aged 81) Houston, Texas, United States

Sport
- Sport: Sports shooting
Medal record
Men's shooting
Representing United States
Olympic Games
Gold medal – first place	1920 Antwerp	Team clay pigeons

Forest Waldemar "Seluya" McNeir (August 16, 1875 – May 9, 1957) was an American sport shooter who competed in the 1920 Summer Olympics. He was born in Washington, D.C., and died in Houston, Texas.

In 1920, McNeir won the gold medal as member of the American team in the team clay pigeons competition.
