= True Oliver =

Canadian sports shooter

True Haviland Oliver
Personal information
- Born: 25 January 1881 Riverside-Albert, New Brunswick, Canada
- Died: 21 October 1957 (aged 76) Surrey, British Columbia, Canada

Sport
- Sport: Sports shooting

True Haviland Oliver (25 January 1881 – 21 October 1957) was a Canadian sports shooter. He competed in the team clay pigeon event at the 1920 Summer Olympics.
