= William McLaren (sport shooter) =

Canadian sports shooter

Personal information
- Born: 8 March 1881 Grey, Ontario, Canada
- Died: 19 March 1962 (aged 81) Calgary, Alberta, Canada

Sport
- Sport: Sports shooting

William Benjamin McLaren (8 March 1881 – 19 March 1962) was a Canadian sports shooter. He competed in the team clay pigeon event at the 1920 Summer Olympics. He won the Canadian trap shooting championship in 1915 and 1920, and eight times the trap shooting championship of Alberta. He had moved to Calgary, Alberta in 1906, and operated a hardware store there. He died in 1962.
