= Augustin Berjat =

French sports shooter

Personal information
- Born: 12 October 1869 Paris, France
- Died: 11 July 1940 (aged 70) Paris, France

Sport
- Sport: Sports shooting

Joseph Augustin Berjat (12 October 1869 – 11 July 1940) was a French sports shooter. He competed in the team clay pigeon event at the 1920 Summer Olympics.
