= Marcel Lafitte =

French sports shooter

Sport
- Sport: Sports shooting

Marcel Lafitte was a French sports shooter. He competed in the team clay pigeon event at the 1920 Summer Olympics.
