= Pavel Mach =

Czech sports shooter

Personal information
- Born: 1886
- Died: Unknown

Sport
- Sport: Sports shooting

Pavel Mach (born 1886, date of death unknown) was a Czechoslovak sports shooter. He competed in the team clay pigeon event at the 1924 Summer Olympics.
