= Robert Huber (sport shooter) =

Finnish sport shooter

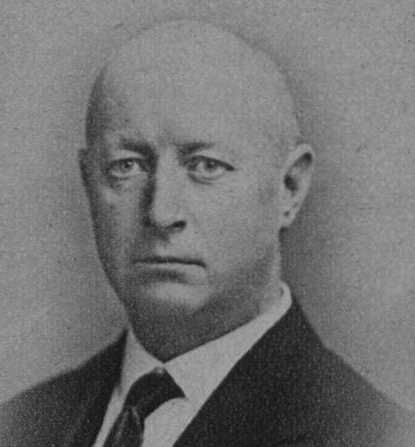

Personal information
- Full name: Robert Waldemar Huber
- National team: Finland
- Born: 30 March 1878 Helsinki, Grand Duchy of Finland, Russian Empire
- Died: 25 November 1946 (aged 68) Helsinki, Finland
- Occupation(s): Consul, chief executive officer, plant manager

Sport
- Sport: Sports shooting
- Club: Suomen Metsästysyhdistys
Medal record
Shooting
Representing Finland
Olympic Games
Bronze medal – third place	1924 Paris	team clay pigeons
World Championships
Silver medal – second place	1929 Stockholm	trap team

Robert Waldemar Huber (30 March 1878 – 25 November 1946) was a Finnish sport shooter, who competed in the 1912 and the 1924 Summer Olympics.

== Shooting ==
Robert Huber at the Olympic Games
Games	Event	Rank	Notes
1908 Summer Olympics	Trap	Did not start	
1912 Summer Olympics	Trap	30th	
1912 Summer Olympics	Trap, team	5th	
1924 Summer Olympics	Team clay pigeons	3rd	

He won silver at the 1929 ISSF World Shooting Championships in the trap team event.

He won five Finnish national championship golds in shotgun events in 1927–1933.

== Other ==
Konrad Huber, who won bronze in the same shotgun team in 1924, was his brother. He was a member of the City Council of Helsinki in 1916–1918.

== Sources ==
- Siukonen, Markku (2001). Urheilukunniamme puolustajat. Suomen olympiaedustajat 1906–2000. Suuri olympiateos (in Finnish). Jyväskylä: Graface. p. 72. ISBN 951-98673-1-7.
