= Pieter Waller =

Dutch sports shooter

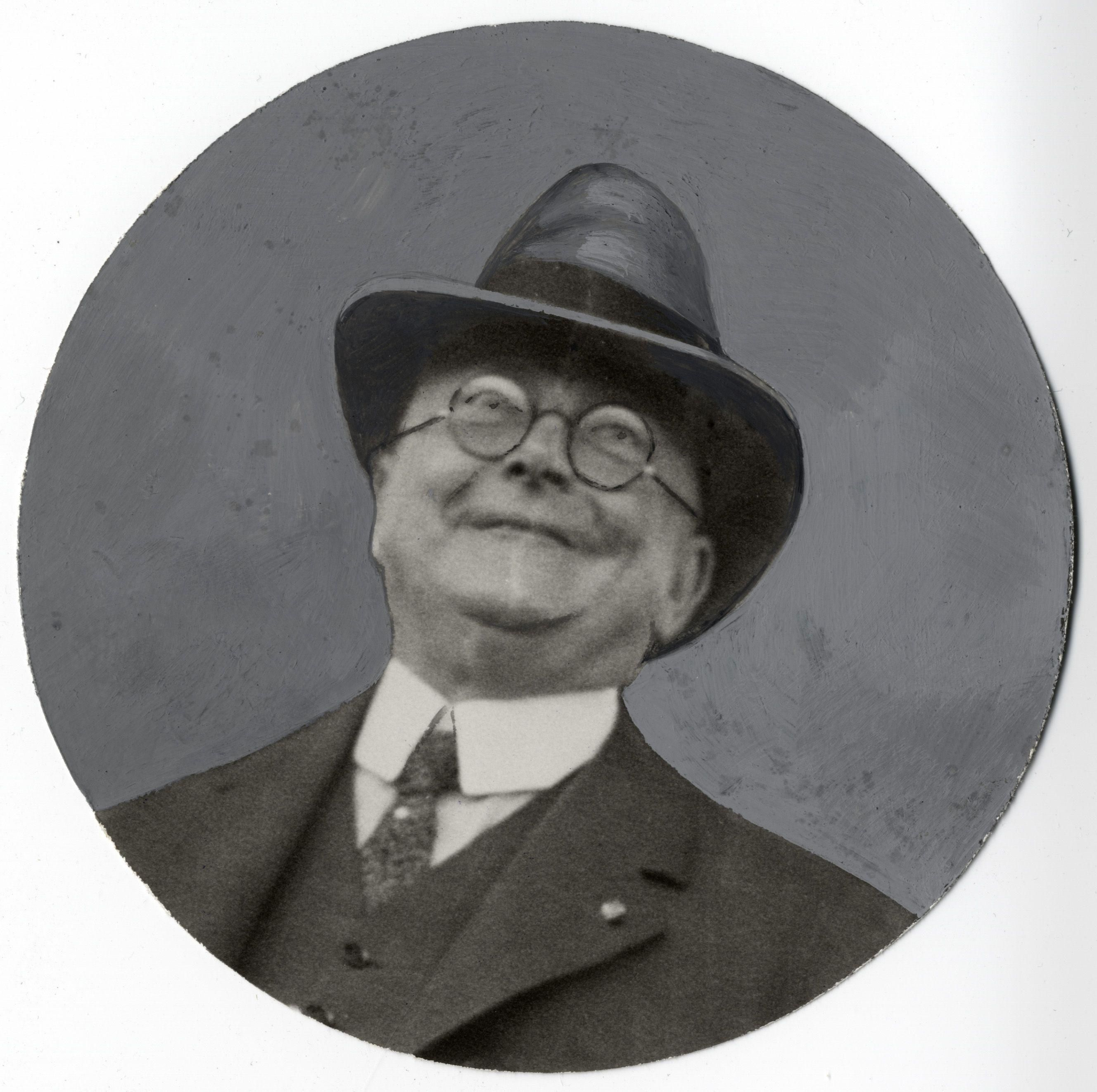

Personal information
- Born: 5 January 1869 Amsterdam, Netherlands
- Died: 19 June 1938 (aged 69) Overveen, Netherlands

Sport
- Sport: Sports shooting

Pieter Wilhelm Waller (5 January 1869 – 19 June 1938) was a Dutch sports shooter. He competed in the team clay pigeon event at the 1920 Summer Olympics.
