= Jean de Lareinty-Tholozan =

French sports shooter

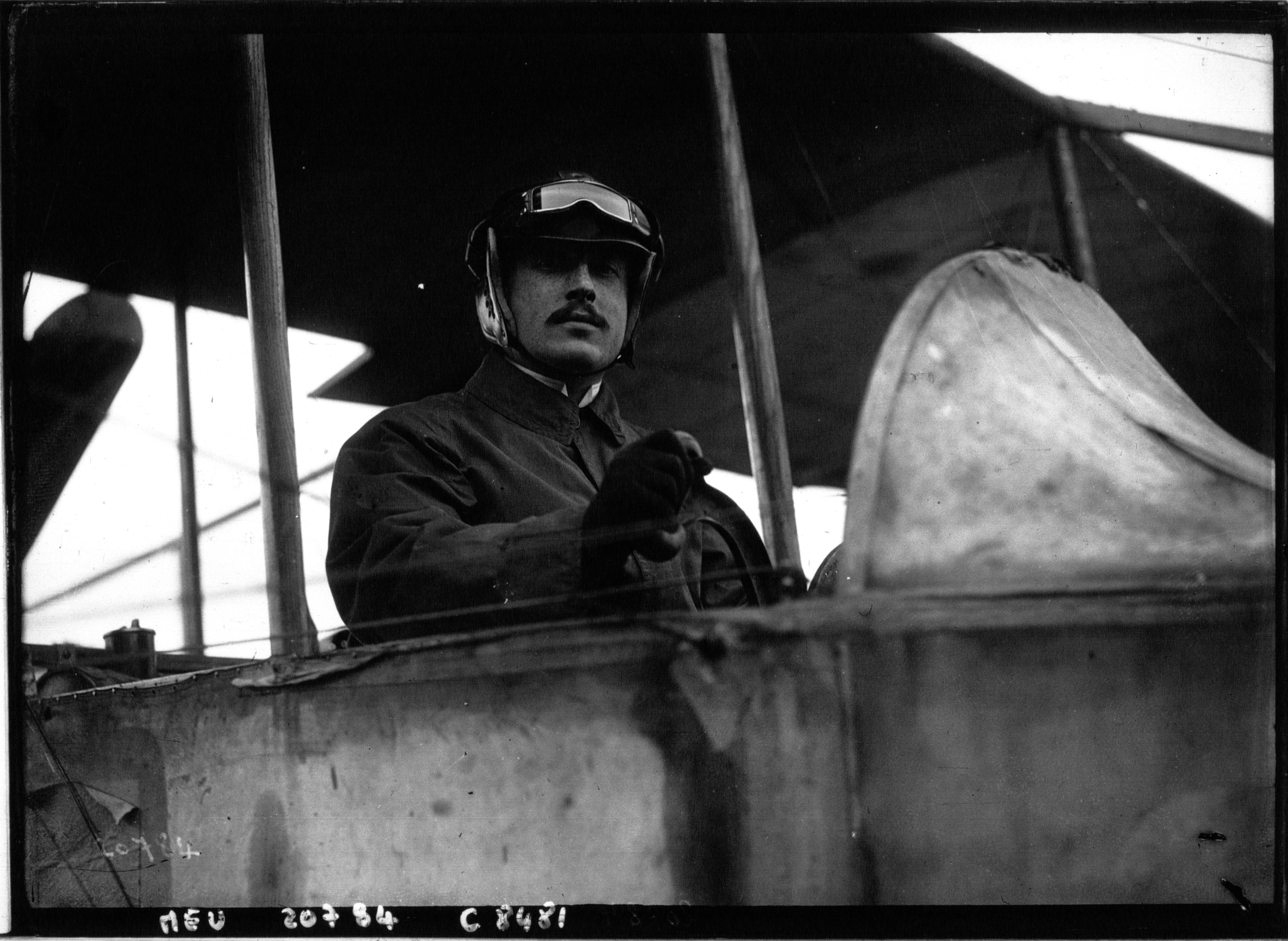

Personal information
- Born: Sosthène Guillaume Jean de Baillardel; 19 January 1890 Paris, France
- Died: 23 October 1955 (aged 65) Hyères, Provence-Alpes-Côte d'Azur

Sport
- Sport: Sports shooting

Sosthène Guillaume Jean de Baillardel, Baron de Lareinty, Marquis de Tholozan (19 January 1890 – 23 October 1955) was a French sports shooter. He competed in the team clay pigeon event at the 1920 Summer Olympics.

== Early life ==
Jean was born in Paris on 19 January 1890. He was a son of Louise de Sabran-Pontevès (1864–1914) and Jules Jean Marie de Baillardel, Baron of Lareinty (1852–1900) of Château de Guermantes, who served as MP for Saint-Nazaire. In 1891, his father was elevated to the title Marquis of Tholozan, which had been held by his father's great-uncle, Ernest René de Baillardel, who died without issue. In 1892, his mother acquired the Château de Blain. Among his siblings were Jules Louis Clément Valentin de Lareinty Tholozan, Honoré Pierre Jules Louis Guillame de Lareinty Tholozan, Alyette Louise Marie de Lareinty Tholozan, and Foulques Louis Marc Ernst de Lareinty Tholozan, married Princess Zénaïde Pavlona Demidov and was adopted by his father-in-law. After his father's death in 1900, his mother married Joseph Marchesse, marquis d'Horschel de Vallefond in 1904 before her death in 1914 at the Château du Lac on Lake Genval.

His maternal grandparents were Marie Julie d'Albert de Luynes (only daughter of Honoré-Louis d'Albert de Luynes, Duke of Chevreuse), and Elzéar Charles Antoine de Sabran-Pontevès, 3rd Duke of Sabran.

== Career ==
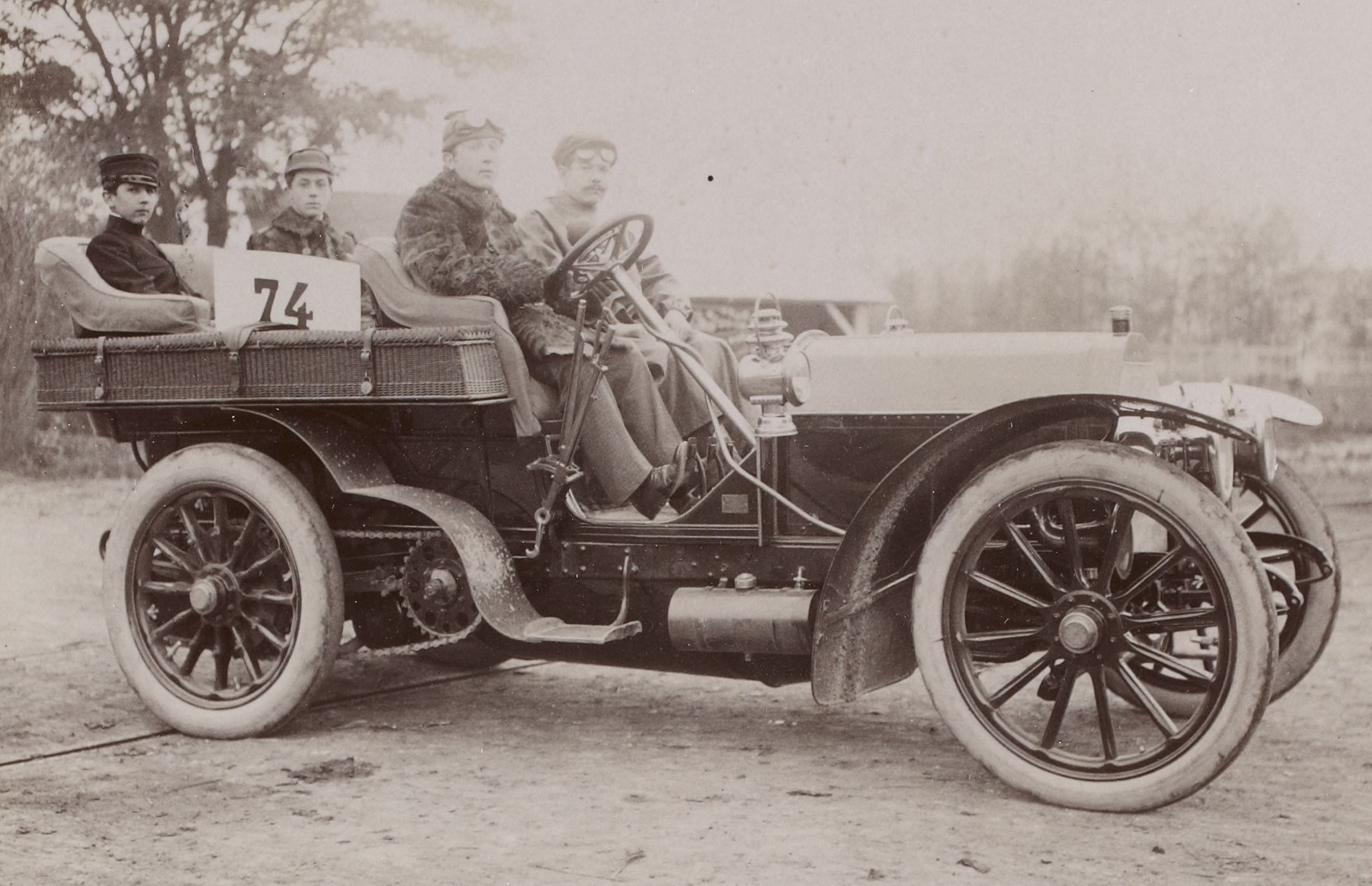
The Marquis de Lareinty-Tholozan, winner of the Côte de Château-Thierry Hill Climb in 1904.

At the 1920 Summer Olympics, he competed in the team clay pigeon event.

== Personal life ==
The Marquis de Tholozan died on 23 October 1955 in Hyères in Provence-Alpes-Côte d'Azur.
