= Manuel de Lambertye =

French sports shooter

Personal information
- Born: 16 March 1884 Madrid, Spain

Sport
- Sport: Sports shooting

Manuel de Lambertye (born 16 March 1884, date of death unknown) was a French sports shooter. He competed in the team clay pigeon event at the 1924 Summer Olympics.
