= Émile Dupont =

Belgian sport shooter

Personal information
- Nationality: Belgian
- Born: 8 June 1887 Liège, Belgium
- Died: 18 March 1959 (aged 71) Liège, Belgium
- Spouse: Marthe Dupont

Sport
- Country: Belgium
- Sport: Sports shooting
Medal record
Men's shooting
Representing Belgium
Olympic Games
Silver medal – second place	1920 Antwerp	Team clay pigeons

Émile Leon Jacques Dupont (8 June 1887 – 18 March 1959) was a Belgian sport shooter who competed in the 1920 Summer Olympics and in the 1924 Summer Olympics.

He was born and died in Liège. In 1911, he was married to Marthe Dupont-Trasenster, a Belgian Olympic tennis player who also represented Belgium at the 1920 and 1924 Summer Olympics.

In 1920, he won the silver medal as member of the Belgian team in the team clay pigeons competition. In the individual trap event he finished ninth. Four years later he was part of the Belgian team which finished fourth in the team clay pigeons competition. He also participated in the individual trap event but his result is unknown.
