= Jacques d'Imecourt =

French sports shooter

Sport
- Sport: Sports shooting

Achievements and titles
- Olympic finals: 1924 Summer Olympics

Jacques d'Imecourt was a French sports shooter. He competed in the trap event at the 1924 Summer Olympics.
