= Jay Clark (sport shooter) =

American sport shooter (1880–1948)

Personal information
- Born: January 25, 1880 Newton, Iowa, United States
- Died: February 6, 1948 (aged 68) Worcester, Massachusetts, United States

Sport
- Sport: Sports shooting
Medal record
Men's shooting
Representing United States
Olympic Games
Gold medal – first place	1920 Antwerp	Team clay pigeons

Jay Clark Jr. (January 25, 1880 – February 6, 1948) was an American sport shooter who competed in the 1920 Summer Olympics.

In 1920, he won the gold medal as a member of the American team in the team clay pigeons competition. He was born in Newton, Iowa and graduated from Grinnell College and Harvard Law School.
