= Shooting at the 1924 Summer Olympics =

Shooting at the Games of the VIII Olympiad
- Dates: 23 June-9 July 1924

At the 1924 Summer Olympics in Paris, ten events in shooting were contested. These would be the last Games in which team events were part of the Olympic shooting program. The competitions were held from 23 June 1924 to 9 July 1924 at the shooting ranges at Versailles, Reims, Camp de Châlons (Mourmelon), and Issy-les-Moulineaux.

== Medal summary ==
Event	Gold	Silver	Bronze
rapid fire pistol	Henry Bailey; United States	Vilhelm Carlberg; Sweden	Lennart Hannelius; Finland
rifle standing	Pierre Coquelin de Lisle; France	Marcus Dinwiddie; United States	Josias Hartmann; Switzerland
600 m free rifle	Morris Fisher; United States	Carl Osburn; United States	Niels Larsen; Denmark
Team free rifle	United States; Raymond Coulter; Joseph Crockett; Morris Fisher; Sidney Hinds; Walter Stokes	France; Paul Colas; Albert Courquin; Pierre Hardy; Georges Roes; Émile Rumeau	Haiti; Ludovic Augustin; Destin Destine; Eloi Metullus; Astrel Rolland; Ludovic Valborge
running deer, single shots	John Boles; United States	Cyril Mackworth-Praed; Great Britain	Otto Olsen; Norway
team running deer, single shots	Norway; Einar Liberg; Ole Lilloe-Olsen; Harald Natvig; Otto Olsen	Sweden; Otto Hultberg; Mauritz Johansson; Fredric Landelius; Alfred Swahn	United States; John Boles; Raymond Coulter; Dennis Fenton; Walter Stokes
running deer, double shots	Ole Lilloe-Olsen; Norway	Cyril Mackworth-Praed; Great Britain	Alfred Swahn; Sweden
Team running deer, double shots	Great Britain; Cyril Mackworth-Praed; Philip Neame; Herbert Perry; Allen Whitty	Norway; Einar Liberg; Ole Lilloe-Olsen; Harald Natvig; Otto Olsen	Sweden; Axel Ekblom; Mauritz Johansson; Fredric Landelius; Alfred Swahn
trap	Gyula Halasy; Hungary	Konrad Huber; Finland	Frank Hughes; United States
team trap	United States; Frederick Etchen; Frank Hughes; Samuel Sharman; William Silkworth John Noel; Clarence Platt	Canada; George Beattie; John Black; Robert Montgomery; Samuel Vance William Barnes; Samuel Newton	Finland; Werner Ekman; Konrad Huber; Robert Huber; Toivo Tikkanen Georg Nordblad; Magnus Wegelius

Notes:

- For the team free rifle the IOC medal database lists also Léon Johnson and André Parmentier as silver medalists for France; and L. H. Clermont and C. Dupre as bronze medalists for Haiti, but all these shooters never participated in this competition.
- For the team running deer, single shots the IOC medal database lists also Hans Nordvik and Oluf Wesmann-Kjær as gold medalists for Norway; and Karl Richter and Karl-Gustaf Svensson as silver medalists for Sweden, but all these shooters never participated in this competition.
- For the team running deer, double shots the IOC medal database lists also John Faunthorpe and John O'Leary as gold medalists for Great Britain; Hans Nordvik and Oluf Wesmann-Kjær as silver medalists for Norway; and Edward Benedicks and Karl-Gustaf Svensson as bronze medalists for Sweden, but all these shooters never participated in this competition.
- For the team trap the IOC medal database lists all six team members as medalists. The shooters below the line were the weakest of their teams and their scores did not count for the team score.

== Participating nations ==
A total of 258 sport shooters from 27 nations competed at the Paris Games:

- Argentina (8)
- Austria (6)
- Belgium (14)
- Brazil (1)
- Canada (6)
- Czechoslovakia (18)
- Denmark (7)
- Egypt (1)
- Finland (15)
- France (22)
- Great Britain (22)
- Greece (7)
- Haiti (5)
- Hungary (7)
- Italy (14)
- Mexico (2)
- Monaco (4)
- Netherlands (11)
- Norway (13)
- Poland (7)
- Portugal (8)
- Romania (5)
- South Africa (7)
- Spain (1)
- Sweden (19)
- Switzerland (7)
- United States (21)

== Medal table ==
Rank	Nation	Gold	Silver	Bronze	Total
1	United States	5	2	2	9
2	Norway	2	1	1	4
3	Great Britain	1	2	0	3
4	France	1	1	0	2
5	Hungary	1	0	0	1
6	Sweden	0	2	2	4
7	Finland	0	1	2	3
8	Canada	0	1	0	1
9	Denmark	0	0	1	1
9	Haiti	0	0	1	1
9	Switzerland	0	0	1	1
Totals (11 entries)		10	10	10	30
