= Friedrich Dietz von Weidenberg =

Austrian sports shooter

Personal information
- Born: 27 October 1871 Vienna, Austria
- Died: 9 December 1941 (aged 70) Vienna, Nazi Germany

Sport
- Sport: Sports shooting

Friedrich Dietz von Weidenberg (27 October 1871 – 9 December 1941) was an Austrian architect and sports shooter. He competed in the team clay pigeon event at the 1924 Summer Olympics.

As an architect he built mostly in his home district of Floridsdorf. His most important works are from the time between 1900 and 1910, like the Weissel-Bad (a former public bath, the façade is now part of a housing complex) and a villa that now houses the district museum (listed as cultural heritage monuments).
