= Bruno Frank (sport shooter) =

Czech sport shooter

Personal information
- Born: 1898

Sport
- Sport: Sport shooting

Bruno Frank (1898–?) was a Czech sport shooter. He competed in the team clay pigeon event at the 1924 Summer Olympics.
