= Martin Stenersen =

Norwegian sports shooter (1879–1968)

Personal information
- Born: 20 November 1879 Vestby, Norway
- Died: 15 April 1968 (aged 88) Riverside, California, United States

Sport
- Sport: Sports shooting

Martin Stenersen (20 November 1879 – 15 April 1968) was a Norwegian shooter who competed in the early 20th century in rifle shooting.

He was born in Vestby. At the 1924 Summer Olympics he finished nineteenth in the trap event and seventh in the team clay pigeons event.

He died in 1968 in Riverside, California.
