= Jacques Mouton =

Belgian sports shooter

Personal information
- Born: 16 January 1888
- Died: 21 February 1958 (aged 70)

Sport
- Sport: Sports shooting

Jacques Mouton (16 January 1888 – 21 February 1958) was a Belgian sports shooter. He competed in the team clay pigeon event at the 1924 Summer Olympics.
