= Kurt Riedl =

Czech sport shooter

Personal information
- Born: 1898

Sport
- Sport: Sport shooting

Kurt Riedl (1898–?) was a Czech sport shooter. He competed in two events at the 1924 Summer Olympics.
