= Erich Zoigner =

Austrian sports shooter

Personal information
- Born: 18 December 1894 Vienna, Austria-Hungary
- Died: 1 January 1969 (aged 74) Baden bei Wien, Austria

Sport
- Sport: Sports shooting

Erich Zoigner (18 December 1894 – 1 January 1969) was an Austrian sports shooter. He competed in two events at the 1924 Summer Olympics.
