= USS George M. Neal =

Guided missile destroyer

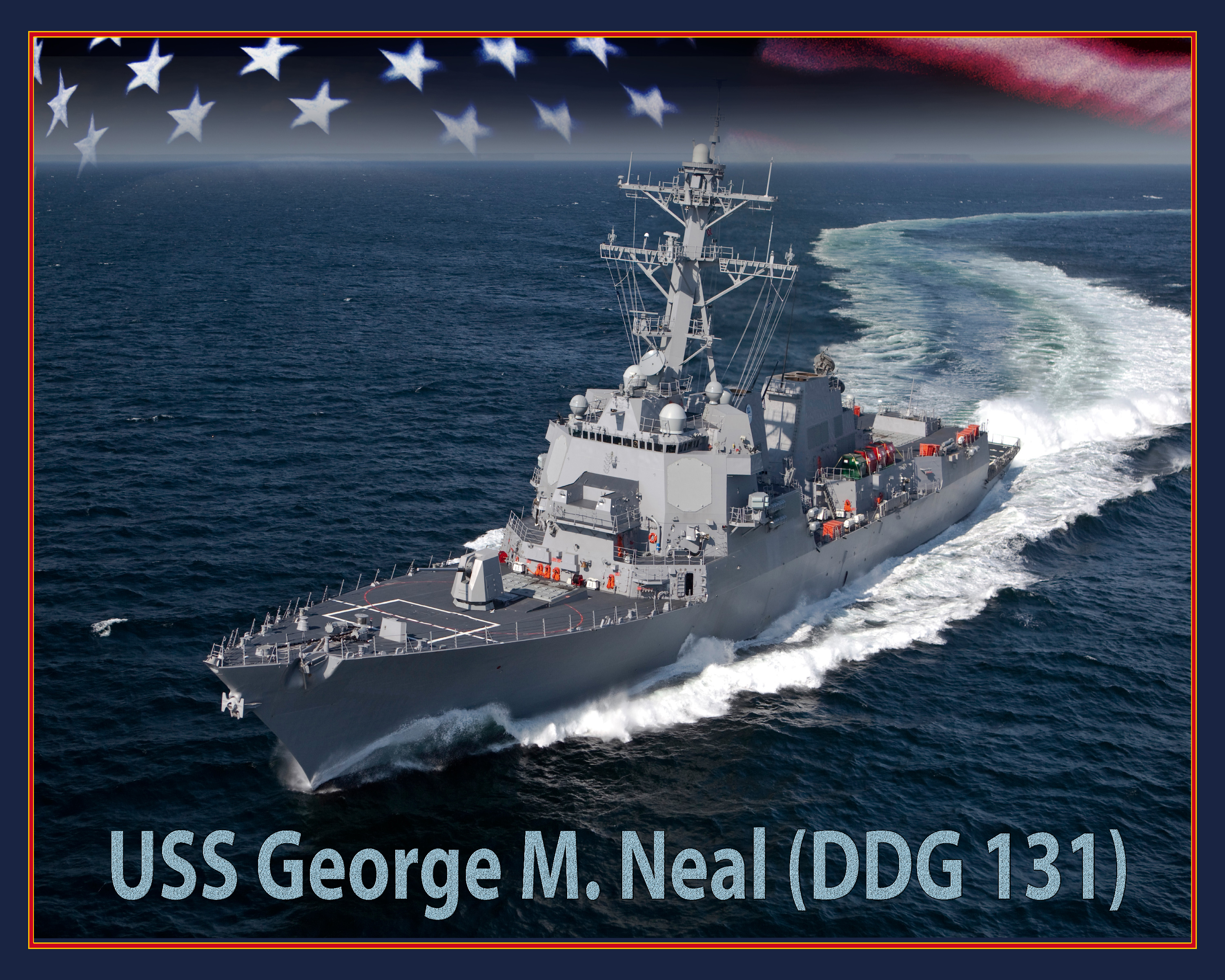
- Graphical depiction of USS George M. Neal (DDG-131)

History

United States
- Name: George M. Neal
- Namesake: George M. Neal
- Awarded: 27 September 2018
- Builder: Huntington Ingalls Industries
- Laid down: 15 December 2023
- Launched: 1 April 2026
- Sponsored by: Kelley Neal Gray
- Identification: Hull number: DDG-131
- Status: Launched

General characteristics
- Class & type: Arleigh Burke-class destroyer
- Displacement: 9,217 tons (full load)
- Length: 510 ft (160 m)
- Beam: 66 ft (20 m)
- Propulsion: 4 × General Electric LM2500 gas turbines 100,000 shp (75,000 kW)
- Speed: 31 knots (57 km/h; 36 mph)
- Complement: 380 officers and enlisted
- Armament: Guns: 1 × 5-inch (127 mm)/62 Mk 45 Mod 4 (lightweight gun); 1 × 20 mm (0.8 in) Phalanx CIWS; 2 × 25 mm (0.98 in) Mk 38 machine gun system; 4 × 0.50 in (12.7 mm) caliber guns; Missiles: 1 × 32-cell, 1 × 64-cell (96 total cells) Mk 41 vertical launching system (VLS): RIM-66M surface-to-air missile; RIM-156 surface-to-air missile; RIM-174A Standard ERAM; RIM-161 anti-ballistic missile; RIM-162 ESSM (quad-packed); BGM-109 Tomahawk cruise missile; RUM-139 vertical launch ASROC; Torpedoes: 2 × Mark 32 triple torpedo tubes: Mark 46 lightweight torpedo; Mark 50 lightweight torpedo; Mark 54 lightweight torpedo
- Armor: Kevlar-type armor with steel hull. Numerous passive survivability measures.
- Aircraft carried: 2 × MH-60R Seahawk helicopters
- Aviation facilities: Double hangar and helipad

USS George M. Neal (DDG-131) is an Arleigh Burke-class (Flight III) Aegis guided missile destroyer of the United States Navy, the sixth Flight III variant. She will be named in honor of Aviation Machinist's Mate 3rd Class George M. Neal, a Korean War veteran and prisoner of war, who was a recipient of the Navy Cross. The sponsor is Kelley Neal Gray, daughter of Aviation Machinist's Mate 3rd Class Neal. Fabrication of the ship began on 2 December 2021. She was launched on April 1, 2026
