= Nicola Rebisso =

Italian sports shooter

Personal information
- Born: 1889
- Died: Unknown

Sport
- Sport: Sports shooting

Nicola Rebisso (born 1889, date of death unknown) was an Italian sports shooter. He competed in two events at the 1924 Summer Olympics.
