= Antonín Siegl =

Czech sports shooter

Personal information
- Born: 1880
- Died: Unknown

Sport
- Sport: Sports shooting

Antonín Siegl (born 1880, date of death unknown) was a Czechoslovak sports shooter. He competed in two events at the 1924 Summer Olympics.
