= Frank Hughes (sport shooter) =

American sport shooter

Personal information
- Born: January 14, 1881 Neligh, Nebraska, United States
- Died: June 28, 1942 (aged 61) Rochester, Minnesota, United States

Sport
- Sport: Sports shooting
Medal record
Men's shooting
Representing United States
Olympic Games
Gold medal – first place	1924 Paris	Team clay pigeons
Bronze medal – third place	1924 Paris	Individual trap

Frank H. Hughes (January 14, 1881 – June 28, 1942) was an American sport shooter who competed in the 1924 Summer Olympics.

In 1924, he won the gold medal as member of the American team in the team clay pigeons competition and the bronze medal in the individual trap. He was born in Neligh, Nebraska and died in Rochester, Minnesota.
