= Hans Schödl =

Austrian sports shooter

Personal information
- Born: 1885
- Died: Unknown

Sport
- Sport: Sports shooting

Hans Schödl (born 1885, date of death unknown) was an Austrian sports shooter. He competed in two events at the 1924 Summer Olympics.
