= Magnus Hallman =

Swedish sports shooter

Personal information
- Born: 7 March 1883 Åre, Sweden
- Died: 16 August 1937 (aged 54) Stockholm, Sweden

Sport
- Sport: Sports shooting

Magnus Hallman (7 March 1883 – 16 August 1937) was a Swedish sports shooter. He competed in two events at the 1924 Summer Olympics.
