= Gyula Halasy =

Hungarian sport shooter

Personal information
- Born: 19 July 1891 Kisvárda, Austria-Hungary
- Died: 20 December 1970 (aged 79) Budapest, Hungary

Sport
- Sport: Sports shooting
Medal record
Men's shooting
Representing Hungary
Olympic Games
Gold medal – first place	1924 Paris	individual trap

Gyula Halasy (19 July 1891 – 20 December 1970) was a Hungarian sport shooter who competed in the 1924 Summer Olympics. In 1924, he won the gold medal in the individual trap competition. He also finished tenth with the Hungarian team in the team clay pigeons event.
