= George Neal South Power Plant =

Coal-fired power plant in Iowa

Coordinates: 42.2999°N 96.3618°W

George Neal South Power Plant is a coal-fired power plant in Iowa. As of 2026, it is estimated that the plant causes 14 deaths per year due to soot and smog pollution.
