= Werner Ekman =

Finnish sport shooter

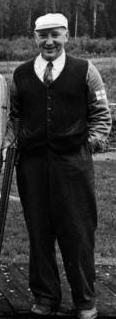
- 1937.

Personal information
- Born: 15 May 1893 Rantasalmi, Finland
- Died: 3 October 1968 (aged 75) Seinäjoki, Finland

Sport
- Sport: Sports shooting
Medal record
Men's shooting
Representing Finland
Olympic Games
Bronze medal – third place	1924 Paris	team clay pigeons

Werner Nicolai Ekman (15 May 1893 – 3 October 1968) was a Finnish sport shooter who competed in the 1924 Summer Olympics. In 1924 he won the bronze medal as member of the Finnish team in the team clay pigeons competition. He also participated in the individual trap and finished eleventh.
