= William Barnes (sport shooter) =

Canadian sport shooter

Personal information
- Born: March 5, 1876 Hamilton, Ontario, Canada
- Died: December 16, 1925 (aged 49) Hamilton, Ontario, Canada

Sport
- Sport: Sports shooting
Medal record
Men's shooting
Representing Canada
Olympic Games
Silver medal – second place	1924 Paris	Team clay pigeons

William Barnes (March 5, 1876 – December 16, 1925) was a Canadian sport shooter. Competing for Canada, he won a silver medal in team clay pigeons at the 1924 Summer Olympics in Paris.
