= George Neal (sport shooter) =

British sport shooter

Personal information
- Born: 4 January 1894 Smallburgh, Norfolk, England
- Died: 20 October 1955 (aged 61) Norwich, Norfolk, England

Sport
- Sport: Sports shooting

George Neal (14 January 1894 – 20 October 1955) was a British sports shooter. He competed in the team clay pigeon event at the 1924 Summer Olympics.
