= August Baumgartner =

Austrian sports shooter (1877–1936)

Personal information
- Born: 22 June 1877 Vienna, Austria-Hungary
- Died: 19 April 1936 (aged 58) Lassee, Austria

Sport
- Sport: Sports shooting

August Baumgartner (22 June 1877 – 19 April 1936) was an Austrian sports shooter. He competed in two events at the 1924 Summer Olympics.
