= Axel Ekblom =

Swedish sport shooter

Personal information
- Born: 22 March 1893 Sankt Ibb, Sweden
- Died: 26 July 1957 (aged 64) Borås, Sweden

Sport
- Sport: Sports shooting
Medal record
Men's shooting
Representing Sweden
Olympic Games
Bronze medal – third place	1924 Paris	team running deer, double shots

Axel W. Ekblom (22 March 1893 – 26 July 1957) was a Swedish sport shooter who competed in the 1924 Summer Olympics. In 1924, he won the bronze medal with the Swedish team in the team running target, double shots competition.

He was also a member of the Swedish trap team, which finished fourth in the team clay pigeon competition. In the individual trap event, he finished 16th.
