= John Black (sport shooter) =

Canadian sport shooter

Personal information
- Born: 26 October 1882 Coylton, South Ayrshire, Scotland
- Died: 16 October 1924 (aged 41) Winnipeg, Manitoba, Canada

Sport
- Sport: Sports shooting
Medal record
Men's shooting
Representing Canada
Olympic Games
Silver medal – second place	1924 Paris	Team clay pigeon

John Hutchison Black (26 October 1882 – 16 October 1924) was a Canadian sports shooter. He was born in Coylton in South Ayrshire, Scotland. Competing for Canada, he won a silver medal in team clay pigeons at the 1924 Summer Olympics in Paris. He also competed at the 1920 Summer Olympics.

He died at Winnipeg General Hospital on 16 October 1924.
