= André Fleury (sport shooter) =

French sport shooter

Personal information
- Born: 30 March 1882 Chantilly, Oise, France
- Died: 23 July 1974 (aged 92)

Sport
- Sport: Sport shooting

André Fleury (30 March 1882 – 23 July 1974) was a French sport shooter who competed in the 1912 Summer Olympics and in the 1920 Summer Olympics.

He was born in Chantilly, Oise. In 1912, he was a member of the French team which finished sixth in the team clay pigeons event. In the individual trap competition he finished 27th. Eight years later, he was part of the French team which finished seventh in the team clay pigeons event.
