= Louis D'Heur =

Belgian sports shooter

Personal information
- Born: 11 May 1889
- Died: Unknown

Sport
- Sport: Sports shooting

Louis D'Heur (born 11 May 1889, date of death unknown) was a Belgian sports shooter. He competed in two events at the 1924 Summer Olympics.
