= László Szomjas =

Hungarian sports shooter

Personal information
- Born: 31 May 1904
- Died: 13 May 1991 (aged 86)

Sport
- Sport: Sports shooting

László Szomjas (31 May 1904 – 13 May 1991) was a Hungarian sports shooter. He competed in three events at the 1924 Summer Olympics.
