= John Noel (sport shooter) =

American sport shooter (1888–1939)

Personal information
- Born: February 6, 1888 Nashville, Tennessee, United States
- Died: November 4, 1939 (aged 51) Nashville, Tennessee, United States

Sport
- Sport: Sports shooting
Medal record
Men's shooting
Representing the United States
Olympic Games
Gold medal – first place	1924 Paris	Team clay pigeons

John Hopkins Noel (February 6, 1888 – November 4, 1939) was an American sport shooter who competed in the 1924 Summer Olympics. He was born and died in Nashville, Tennessee. In 1924, he won the gold medal as member of the American team in the team clay pigeons competition.
