= Giacomo Rossi (sport shooter) =

Italian sports shooter (1888–1951)

Personal information
- Born: 23 November 1888
- Died: 5 October 1951 (aged 62)

Sport
- Sport: Sports shooting

Giacomo Rossi (23 November 1888 – 5 October 1951) was an Italian sports shooter. He competed in two events at the 1924 Summer Olympics.
