= Clarence Platt =

American sport shooter (1873–1941)

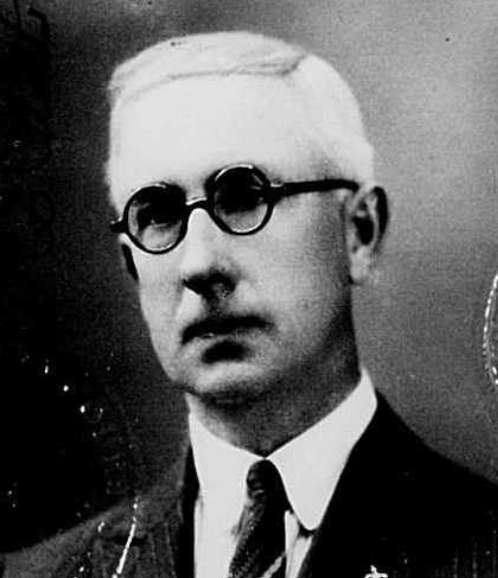

Personal information
- Born: October 28, 1873 Camden, New Jersey, U.S.
- Died: August 25, 1941 (aged 67) Bridgeton, New Jersey, U.S.

Sport
- Sport: Sports shooting
Medal record
Men's shooting
Representing the United States
Olympic Games
Gold medal – first place	1924 Paris	Team clay pigeons

Clarence Bitters Platt (October 28, 1873 – August 25, 1941) was an American sport shooter. He was born in Camden, New Jersey. He won a gold medal in team clay pigeons at the 1924 Summer Olympics in Paris.
