= Léon Deloy =

French sport shooter

Personal information
- Full name: Léon Émile Paul Théodore Deloy
- Born: 4 February 1894 Paris, France
- Died: 21 January 1969 (aged 74) Monaco

Sport
- Sport: Sports shooting

Léon Deloy (4 February 1894 – 21 January 1969) was a French sports shooter. He competed in two events at the 1924 Summer Olympics.

In 1923, Léon Deloy obtained authorization to install an amateur broadcasting station, on short waves, his call sign was F8AB. On 27 November 1923, the first global transatlantic transmission was finally made, between Hartford (Connecticut) and Nice on short waves (100–195 meters in length). wave) with Fred H. Schnell using Telegraphy. This opened the way to the use of short waves, discovered by "radio amateurs", to other users (public or military). For his role as a "pioneer" in the discovery of the use of short waves, he obtained the Legion of Honor.
