= Stade Olympique de Reims =

Firing range in Tinqueux, France

Le Stade Olympique de Reims was the temporary name of a firing range located in Tinqueux, near Reims, France, home of the Société de Tir de Reims. For the 1924 Summer Olympics in neighboring Paris, the range hosted the shooting 50 m rifle prone event.
