= Samuel Sharman =

American sport shooter

Personal information
- Born: November 2, 1879 Gallatin County, Montana, United States
- Died: August 30, 1951 (aged 71) Los Angeles, California, United States

Sport
- Sport: Sports shooting
Medal record
Men's shooting
Representing United States
Olympic Games
Gold medal – first place	1924 Paris	Team clay pigeons

Samuel Henry Sharman (November 2, 1879 – August 30, 1951) was an American sport shooter who competed in the 1924 Summer Olympics.

In 1924, he won the gold medal as member of the American team in the team clay pigeons competition. He also participated in the Individual trap and finished sixth.

He was born in Gallatin County, Montana and died in Los Angeles, California.
