= Fred Etchen =

American sport shooter (1884–1961)

Personal information
- Born: September 25, 1884 Coffeyville, Kansas, United States
- Died: November 6, 1961 (aged 77) Phoenix, Arizona, United States

Sport
- Sport: Sports shooting
Medal record
Men's shooting
Representing United States
Olympic Games
Gold medal – first place	1924 Paris	Team clay pigeons

Fred Etchen (September 25, 1884 – November 6, 1961) was an American sport shooter who competed in the 1924 Summer Olympics.

In 1924, he won the gold medal as member of the American team in the team clay pigeons competition. He also participated in the Individual trap and finished 24th.

He was born in Coffeyville, Kansas.
