= George M. Neal =

United States Navy sailor

- Born: August 29, 1930; Springfield, Ohio
- Died: December 1, 2016 (aged 86); Dayton, Ohio
- Burial place: Arlington National Cemetery (Section 76, Grave 1082)
- Military career
- Allegiance: United States
- Branch: United States Navy
- Rank: Aviation machinist's mate Petty officer third class
- Unit: Helicopter Squadron One
- Conflicts: Korean War
- Awards: Navy Cross; Prisoner of War Medal

George Milton Neal (August 29, 1930 – December 1, 2016) was a United States Navy Petty Officer from Springfield, Ohio. He served with Helicopter Utility Squadron ONE (HU-1), a Navy Helicopter rescue unit embarked from Australian light cruiser HMAS Sydney during the Korean War and was awarded the Navy Cross for his actions on July 3, 1951, when, while serving with Helicopter Utility Squadron ONE, he and pilot Lt. j.g. John Kelvin Koelsch attempted to rescue Marine Corps Captain James Wilkins. Wilkins crashed near Yondong in North Korea after his Vought F4U Corsair took antiaircraft fire.

He died on December 1, 2016, and was interred in Arlington National Cemetery.

== Navy Cross ==
The President of the United States takes pleasure in presenting The NAVY CROSS to George Milton Neal, Aviation Machinist's Mate Third Class, U.S. Navy For service as set forth in the following citation:

For extraordinary heroism in connection with military operations against an armed enemy of the United Nations while serving with Helicopter Utility Squadron ONE (HU-1), a Navy Helicopter Rescue Unit embarked from H.M.A.S. Sydney over North Korea on 3 July 1951. Aviation Machinist’s Mate Third Class Neal volunteered as crewman to fly in a helicopter deep into North Korean mountains to attempt the rescue of a Marine Aviator who had been shot down and was trapped by the enemy. Despite a low overcast of clouds which prevented their being protected by fighter aircraft, the helicopter crew descended below the clouds where the downed aviator’s parachute was located. Not finding the aviator during their first tour of the valley, the helicopter crew entered the area a second time in the face of intense enemy fire, approaching darkness, and adverse weather, any one of which made the mission extremely hazardous. Because of their courageous persistence, and their absolute disregard for their own safety, the helicopter’s crews’ search was successful. Aviation Machinist’s Mate Third Class Neal fearlessly exposed himself to the intense enemy gunfire and guided the rescue sling to the downed aviator. As Neal was hoisting him up to the helicopter, the enemy fire became so effective that the helicopter was disabled and crashed. Neal then assisted his pilot and the Marine aviator, who was seriously burned, in attempting to escape from the enemy troops. The small party effectively evaded the enemy forces for nine days under the most adverse conditions during which time Aviation Machinist’s Mate Third Class Neal contributed immeasurably to the success of the maneuver by his unflagging physical endurance, courageous persistence and fighting spirit which did much to maintain the morale of his companions. Aviation Machinist’s Mate Third Class Neal’s devotion to duty, to his country, and to his fellow men as well as his outstanding conduct before and after capture and the indomitable courage he displayed at all times were in keeping with the highest traditions of the United States Naval Service.

== Legacy ==
An Arleigh Burke-class guided-missile destroyer, DDG 131, named in honor of the Korean War veteran, and Navy Cross Recipient, Aviation Machinist's Mate 3rd Class George M. Neal, was launched on April 1, 2026.
