= Georg Nordblad =

Finnish sport shooter

Personal information
- Born: 24 August 1894 Helsinki, Finland
- Died: 15 August 1970 (aged 75) Helsinki, Finland

Sport
- Sport: Sports shooting
Medal record
Men's shooting
Representing Finland
Olympic Games
Bronze medal – third place	1924 Paris	team clay pigeons

Georg Julius Wilhelm Nordblad (24 August 1894 – 15 August 1970) was a Finnish sport shooter who competed in the 1924 Summer Olympics. In 1924 he won the bronze medal as member of the Finnish team in the team clay pigeons competition. He also participated in the individual trap and finished 24th.
