= John O'Leary (sport shooter) =

Sports shooter

John Joseph O'Leary
Personal information
- Born: 16 December 1880 Liverpool, Lancashire, England
- Died: 8 March 1967 (aged 86) Trim, County Meath, Ireland

Sport
- Sport: Sports shooting

John O'Leary (16 December 1880 – 8 March 1967) was a British sports shooter. He competed in three events at the 1924 Summer Olympics.
