= Konrad Huber =

Finnish sport shooter

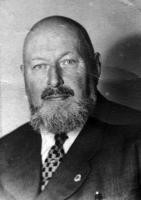
- 1950s.

Personal information
- Nickname: "Konni" Huber
- Born: 4 November 1892 Helsinki, Finland
- Died: 4 December 1960 (aged 68) Helsinki, Finland

Sport
- Sport: Sports shooting
Medal record
Men's shooting
Representing Finland
Olympic Games
Silver medal – second place	1924 Paris	individual trap
Bronze medal – third place	1924 Paris	team clay pigeons

Konrad Walentin Huber (4 November 1892 – 4 December 1960) was a Finnish sport shooter who competed in the 1924 Summer Olympics and the 1952 Summer Olympics. In 1924 he won the bronze medal as member of the Finnish team in the team clay pigeons competition and the silver medal in the individual trap event.
