= Heinrich Bartosch =

Austrian sports shooter

Personal information
- Born: 10 July 1869

Sport
- Sport: Sports shooting

Heinrich Bartosch (born 10 July 1869, date of death unknown) was an Austrian sports shooter. He competed in two events at the 1924 Summer Olympics.
