= Samuel Vance (sport shooter) =

Canadian sport shooter

Personal information
- Born: 30 March 1879 Oxford, Ontario, Canada
- Died: 16 May 1947 (aged 68) Tillsonburg, Canada

Sport
- Sport: Sports shooting
Medal record
Men's shooting
Representing Canada
Olympic Games
Silver medal – second place	1924 Paris	Team clay pigeons

Samuel Goodwin Vance (30 March 1879 – 16 May 1947) was a Canadian sport shooter who competed in the 1920 Summer Olympics and in the 1924 Summer Olympics.

In 1920, he finished fifth with the Canadian team in the team clay pigeons competition. He also participated in the individual trap event, but his place is unknown. Four years later, he won the silver medal as a member of the Canadian team in the team clay pigeons competition. In the individual trap event, he finished sixth.
