= Samuel Newton (sport shooter) =

Canadian sport shooter

Personal information
- Born: November 23, 1881 Drummondville, Quebec, Canada
- Died: October 11, 1944 (aged 62) Sherbrooke, Quebec, Canada

Sport
- Sport: Sports shooting
Medal record
Men's shooting
Representing Canada
Olympic Games
| Silver medal – second place | 1924 Paris | Team clay pigeons |

Samuel Robert Newton (November 23, 1881 – October 11, 1944) was a Canadian sport shooter, who competed in the 1924 Summer Olympics. In 1924 he won a silver medal in team trap event.
