= Robert Montgomery (sport shooter) =

Canadian sport shooter

Personal information
- Born: 20 September 1891 Lincoln, Ontario, Canada
- Died: 10 January 1964 (aged 72) Boston

Sport
- Sport: Sports shooting
Medal record
Men's shooting
Representing Canada
Olympic Games
Silver medal – second place	1924 Paris	Team clay pigeons

Robert James Montgomery (born 20 September 1891 – 10 January 1964) was a Canadian sports shooter. He was born in Lincoln, Ontario. Competing for Canada, he won a silver medal in team clay pigeons at the 1924 Summer Olympics in Paris.

He died in Boston on 10 January 1964.
