= Shooting at the 1920 Summer Olympics – Men's 50 metre team pistol =

Olympic shooting event

Men's 50 metre team free pistol at the Games of the VII Olympiad
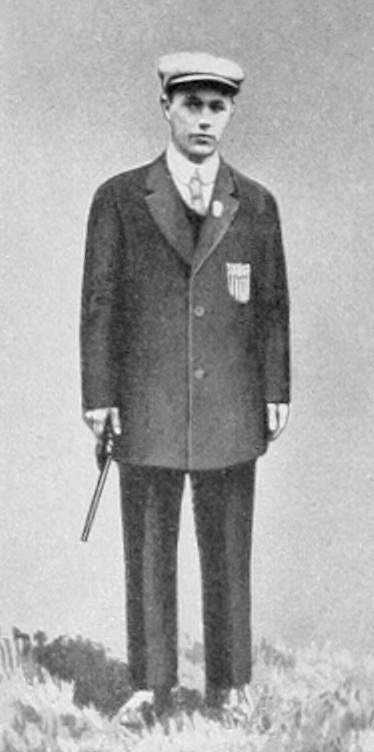
- Two-time gold medalist Alfred Lane (1912)
- Venue: Beverloo Camp
- Date: 2 August 1920
- Competitors: 65 from 13 nations
- Winning score: 2372

Medalists
1st place, gold medalist(s)		United States: Raymond Bracken; Karl Frederick; Michael Kelly; Alfred Lane; James H. Snook
2nd place, silver medalist(s)		Sweden: Anders Andersson; Gunnar Gabrielsson; Sigvard Hultcrantz; Anders Johnson; Casimir Reuterskiöld
3rd place, bronze medalist(s)		Brazil: Dario Barbosa; Afrânio da Costa; Guilherme Paraense; Fernando Soledade; Sebastião Wolf

The men's 50 metre team pistol was a shooting sports event held as part of the Shooting at the 1920 Summer Olympics programme. It was the fourth and last appearance of the event. The competition was held on 2 August 1920. 65 shooters from 13 nations competed. The event was won by the United States, the nation's third consecutive victory in the event. Alfred Lane returned from the 1912 team, making him the second (and last) person to earn multiple medals, and multiple gold medals, in the men's team pistol. Sweden also repeated as silver medalists. Bronze went to Brazil, in that nation's debut in the event.

About a quarter of the way through the competition, it was discovered that two of the teams were shooting from the wrong distances. Brazil was shooting from 45 metres, while the United States was at 54 metres. Both teams restarted; the United States was given the option of keeping the scores from the longer distance, but declined. The American scores for the reshoot were actually lower, likely a result of increased wind, but the United States still won comfortably.

== Background ==
This was the fourth and final appearance of a team version of what would become (for individuals) standardised as the men's ISSF 50 meter pistol event. The team event was held 4 times, at every Summer Olympics from 1900 to 1920 (except 1904, when no shooting events were held).

Brazil, Czechoslovakia, Denmark, Finland, Italy, and Spain each made their debut in the event. Belgium, France, Greece, the Netherlands, Sweden, and the United States all made their third appearance; no nation had appeared all four times the event was held.

== Competition format ==
The competition had each shooter fire 60 shots, in 10 series of 6 shots each, at a distance of 50 metres. The target was round, 50 centimetres in diameter, with 10 scoring rings. Scoring for each shot was up to 10 points, in increments of 1 point. The maximum individual score possible was 600 points. The team score was the sum of the five shooters' individual scores, with a maximum of 3000 points. Shooters who had competed in the team event could use their team score in the individual competition.

Pistols with hairspring triggers, allowed in the world championship, continued to be banned.

== Schedule ==
Date	Time	Round
Monday, 2 August 1920	8:00	Final

== Results ==
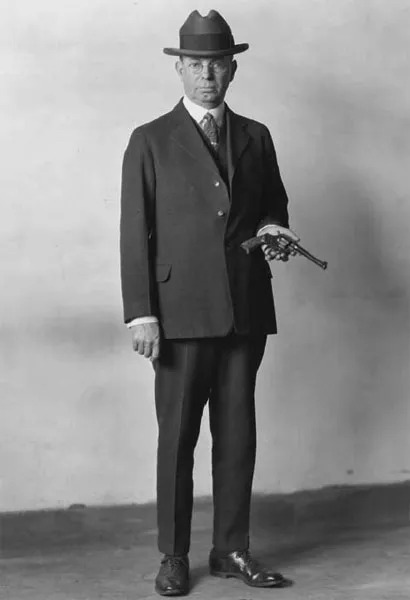
James H. Snook was a member of the gold-medal winning American team.

The scores of the five shooters on each team were summed to give a team score. The maximum score was 3000.

Rank	Nation	Shooter	Score
1st place, gold medalist(s)	United States	United States total	2372
1st place, gold medalist(s)	United States	Karl Frederick	496
1st place, gold medalist(s)	United States	Alfred Lane	481
1st place, gold medalist(s)	United States	James H. Snook	471
1st place, gold medalist(s)	United States	Michael Kelly	468
1st place, gold medalist(s)	United States	Raymond Bracken	456
2nd place, silver medalist(s)	Sweden	Sweden total	2289
2nd place, silver medalist(s)	Sweden	Anders Andersson	467
2nd place, silver medalist(s)	Sweden	Casimir Reuterskiöld	464
2nd place, silver medalist(s)	Sweden	Gunnar Gabrielsson	460
2nd place, silver medalist(s)	Sweden	Sigvard Hultcrantz	450
2nd place, silver medalist(s)	Sweden	Anders Johnson	448
3rd place, bronze medalist(s)	Brazil	Brazil total	2264
3rd place, bronze medalist(s)	Brazil	Afrânio da Costa	489
3rd place, bronze medalist(s)	Brazil	Guilherme Paraense	456
3rd place, bronze medalist(s)	Brazil	Sebastião Wolf	454
3rd place, bronze medalist(s)	Brazil	Dario Barbosa	441
3rd place, bronze medalist(s)	Brazil	Fernando Soledade	424
4	Greece	Greece total	2240
4	Greece	Iason Sappas	464
4	Greece	Ioannis Theofilakis	462
4	Greece	Alexandros Theofilakis	
4	Greece	Georgios Moraitinis	
4	Greece	Alexandros Vrasivanopoulos	
5	Belgium	Belgium total	2229
5	Belgium	Paul Van Asbroeck	466
5	Belgium	Conrad Adriaenssens	
5	Belgium	Arthur Balbaert	
5	Belgium	Joseph Haesaerts	
5	Belgium	François Heyens	
6	France	France total	2225
6	France	Joseph Pecchia	
6	France	Jules Maujean	
6	France	Léon Johnson	
6	France	Émile Boitout	
6	France	André Regaud	
7	Italy	Italy total	2224
7	Italy	Ricardo Ticchi	
7	Italy	Alfredo Galli	
7	Italy	Roberto Preda	
7	Italy	Giancarlo Boriani	
7	Italy	Raffaele Frasca	
8	Denmark	Denmark total	2159
8	Denmark	Niels Larsen	470
8	Denmark	Lars Jørgen Madsen	450
8	Denmark	Otto Plantener	419
8	Denmark	Carl Pedersen	413
8	Denmark	Christian Andersen	407
9	Switzerland	Switzerland total	2136
9	Switzerland	Fritz Zulauf	436
9	Switzerland	Domenico Giambonini	432
9	Switzerland	Hans Egli	427
9	Switzerland	Gustave Amoudruz	426
9	Switzerland	Bernard Siegenthaler	415
10	Netherlands	Netherlands total	2123
10	Netherlands	Gerard van den Bergh	445
10	Netherlands	Antonius Bouwens	444
10	Netherlands	Klaas Woldendorp	443
10	Netherlands	Cornelis van Altenburg	397
10	Netherlands	Herman Bouwens	394
11	Finland	Finland total	2052
11	Finland	Kalle Lappalainen	
11	Finland	Vilho Vauhkonen	
11	Finland	Robert Tikkanen	
11	Finland	Nestori Toivonen	
11	Finland	Yrjö Kolho	
12	Spain	Spain total	2010
12	Spain	José Bento	
12	Spain	Luis Calvet	
12	Spain	Antonio Bonilla	
12	Spain	José María Miró	
12	Spain	Antonio Vázquez	
—	Czechoslovakia	Czechoslovakia total	DNF
—	Czechoslovakia	František Procházka	
—	Czechoslovakia	Josef Štojdl	
—	Czechoslovakia	František Bláha	
—	Czechoslovakia	Antonín Brych	
—	Czechoslovakia	Václav Kindl	
