= Shooting at the 1920 Summer Olympics – Men's 50 metre pistol =

Olympic shooting event

Men's 50 metre free pistol at the Games of the VII Olympiad
- Shooting pictogram
- Venue: Beverloo Camp
- Date: 2 August 1920
- Competitors: 31 from 8 nations
- Winning score: 496

Medalists
1st place, gold medalist(s)		Karl Frederick; United States
2nd place, silver medalist(s)		Afrânio da Costa; Brazil
3rd place, bronze medalist(s)		Alfred Lane; United States

The men's individual competition with revolver and pistol was a shooting sports event held as part of the Shooting at the 1920 Summer Olympics programme. It was the fifth appearance of such an event at different distances. The competition was held on 2 August 1920. 31 shooters from 8 nations competed. The event was won by Karl Frederick of the United States, the nation's second consecutive and third overall victory in the event (most of any nation). Defending champion Alfred Lane took bronze, the first man to win multiple medals in the event. Brazil's Afrânio da Costa finished between the two Americans, taking silver.

== Background ==
This was the fifth appearance of what would become standardised as the men's ISSF 50 meter pistol event. The event was held at every Summer Olympics from 1896 to 1920 (except 1904, when no shooting events were held) and from 1936 to 2016; it was open to women from 1968 to 1980. 1896 and 1908 were the only Games in which the distance was not 50 metres; the former used 30 metres and the latter 50 yards.

Of the top ten shooters from the pre-World War I 1912 Games, only the defending gold medalist, Alfred Lane of the United States, returned.

Brazil and Norway each made their debut in the event. Greece and the United States each made their fourth appearance, tied for most of any nation.

Frederick used a Smith & Wesson Perfected Model Third Model. Da Costa used a new Colt .22 pistol that had been loaned to the Brazilian team by the United States team, and ammunition from Alfred Lane.

== Competition format ==
The competition had each shooter fire 60 shots, in 10 series of 6 shots each, at a distance of 50 metres. The target was round, 50 centimetres in diameter, with 10 scoring rings. Scoring for each shot was up to 10 points, in increments of 1 point. The maximum score possible was 600 points. Shooters who had competed in the team event could use their team score in the individual competition.

Pistols with hairspring triggers, allowed in the world championship, continued to be banned.

== Records ==
Prior to this competition, the existing world and Olympic records were as follows.

World record				
Olympic record	Karl Röderer (SUI)	503	Paris, France	1 August 1900

No new world or Olympic records were set during the competition.

== Schedule ==
Date	Time	Round
Monday, 2 August 1920		Final

== Results ==
The maximum score was 600.

Rank	Shooter	Nation	Score
1st place, gold medalist(s)	Karl Frederick	United States	496
2nd place, silver medalist(s)	Afrânio da Costa	Brazil	489
3rd place, bronze medalist(s)	Alfred Lane	United States	481
4	Laurits Larsen	Denmark	475
5	Niels Larsen	Denmark	470
6	Anders Andersson	Sweden	467
7	Paul Van Asbroeck	Belgium	466
8	Iason Sappas	Greece	464
8	Casimir Reuterskiöld	Sweden	464
10	Ioannis Theofilakis	Greece	462
11	Gunnar Gabrielsson	Sweden	460
12	George Fiske	United States	458
13	Raymond Bracken	United States	456
13	Guilherme Paraense	Brazil	456
15	Sebastião Wolf	Brazil	454
16	Lars Jørgen Madsen	Denmark	450
16	Sigvard Hultcrantz	Sweden	450
18	Anders Johnson	Sweden	448
19	Gerard van den Bergh	Netherlands	445
20	Antonius Bouwens	Netherlands	444
21	Klaas Woldendorp	Netherlands	443
22	Einar Liberg	Norway	442
23	Dario Barbosa	Brazil	441
24	Oluf Wesmann-Kjær	Norway	434
25	Howard Bayles	United States	430
26	Fernando Soledade	Brazil	424
27	Otto Plantener	Denmark	419
28	Carl Pedersen	Denmark	413
29	Christian Andersen	Denmark	407
30	Cornelis van Altenburg	Netherlands	397
31	Herman Bouwens	Netherlands	394
