= Shooting at the 1920 Summer Olympics – Men's 30 metre team rapid fire pistol =

Sports shooting at the Olympics

Men's 30 metre team rapid fire pistol at the Games of the VII Olympiad
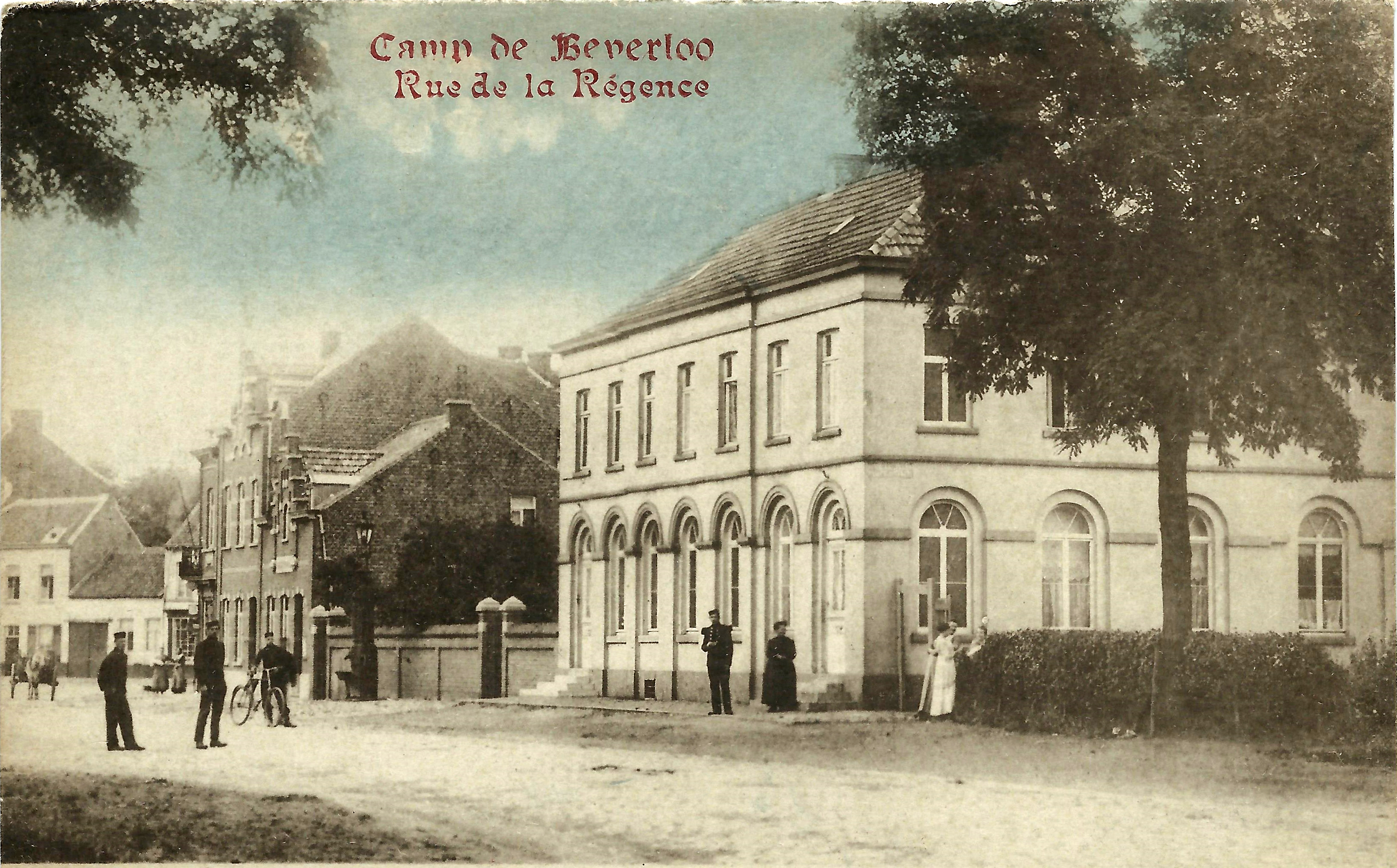
- Beverloo Camp
- Venue: Beverloo Camp
- Date: 3 August 1920
- Competitors: 45 from 9 nations

Medalists
1st place, gold medalist(s)		Karl Frederick, Louis Harant, Michael Kelly, Alfred Lane, James H. Snook; United States
2nd place, silver medalist(s)		Georgios Moraitinis, Iason Sappas, Alexandros Theofilakis, Ioannis Theofilakis, Alexandros Vrasivanopoulos; Greece
3rd place, bronze medalist(s)		Gustave Amoudruz, Hans Egli, Domenico Giambonini, Joseph Jehle, Fritz Zulauf; Switzerland

The men's 30 metre team rapid fire pistol was a shooting sports event held as part of the Shooting at the 1920 Summer Olympics programme. It was the second and last appearance of the event. The competition was held on 3 August 1920, and 45 shooters from 9 nations competed.

== Results ==
The scores of the five shooters on each team were summed to give a team score. The maximum score was 1500.

Place	Shooter	Score
1
1	United States	1310
1	Louis Harant	268
1	Alfred Lane	263
1	Karl Frederick	262
1	James H. Snook	261
1	Michael Kelly	256
2
2	Greece	1285
2	Alexandros Vrasivanopoulos	264
2	Georgios Moraitinis	258
2	Iason Sappas	258
2	Alexandros Theofilakis	254
2	Ioannis Theofilakis	251
3
3	Switzerland	1270
3	Fritz Zulauf	269
3	Joseph Jehle	262
3	Gustave Amoudruz	257
3	Hans Egli	242
3	Domenico Giambonini	240
4
4	Brazil	1261
4	Guilherme Paraense	274
4	Mário Maurity	
4	Sebastião Wolf	
4	Demerval Peixoto	
4	Fernando Soledade	
5
5	France	1239
5	Joseph Pecchia	
5	Jules Maujean	
5	Léon Johnson	
5	Émile Boitout	
5	André Regaud	
6
6	Spain	1224
6	José Bento	
6	Luis Calvet	
6	Antonio Bonilla	
6	Antonio Vázquez	
6	José María Miró	
7
7	Belgium	1221
7	Paul Van Asbroeck	
7	Norbert Van Molle	
7	Philippe Cammaerts	
7	Robert Andrieux	
7	Jules Bastin	
7	Léon De Coster	
8
8	Portugal	1184
8	Hermínio Rebelo	
8	António dos Santos	
8	António Ferreira	
8	António Martins	
8	Dario Canas	
9
9	Italy	1121
9	Ricardo Ticchi	
9	Alfredo Galli	
9	Roberto Preda	
9	Giancarlo Boriani	
9	Raffaele Frasca	
