= Shooting at the 1920 Summer Olympics =

Shooting at the Games of the VII Olympiad
- Venue: Beverloo Camp; Hoogboom Military Camp
- Dates: 22 July-3 August 1920

At the 1920 Summer Olympics in Antwerp, 21 events in shooting were contested. A contested 22nd event may have taken place as a list of medal winners are known but the event is unknown.

The competitions were held from 22 July 1920 to 3 August 1920, with Beverloo Camp hosting the pistol and rifle events, and the Olympic trap and 100 metre running deer held at Hoogboom Military Camp.

== Medal summary ==
Event	Gold	Silver	Bronze
30 m rapid fire pistol	Guilherme Paraense; Brazil	Raymond Bracken; United States	Fritz Zulauf; Switzerland
Team 30 m military pistol	United States; Karl Frederick; Louis Harant; Michael Kelly; Alfred Lane; James H. Snook	Greece; Georgios Moraitinis; Iason Sappas; Alexandros Theofilakis; Ioannis Theofilakis; Alexandros Vrasivanopoulos	Switzerland; Gustave Amoudruz; Hans Egli; Domenico Giambonini; Joseph Jehle; Fritz Zulauf
50 m free pistol	Karl Frederick; United States	Afrânio da Costa; Brazil	Alfred Lane; United States
Team 50 m free pistol	United States; Raymond Bracken; Karl Frederick; Michael Kelly; Alfred Lane; James H. Snook	Sweden; Anders Andersson; Gunnar Gabrielsson; Sigvard Hultcrantz; Anders Johnson; Casimir Reuterskiöld	Brazil; Dario Barbosa; Afrânio da Costa; Guilherme Paraense; Fernando Soledade; Sebastião Wolf
50 m small bore rifle	Lawrence Nuesslein; United States	Arthur Rothrock; United States	Dennis Fenton; United States
Team 50 m small bore rifle	United States; Dennis Fenton; Willis A. Lee; Lawrence Nuesslein; Arthur Rothrock; Oliver Schriver	Sweden; Oscar Eriksson; Sigvard Hultcrantz; Leon Lagerlöf; Erik Ohlsson; Ragnar Stare	Norway; Albert Helgerud; Sigvart Johansen; Anton Olsen; Østen Østensen; Olaf Sletten
300 m free rifle, 3 positions	Morris Fisher; United States	Niels Larsen; Denmark	Østen Østensen; Norway
Team free rifle, 3 positions	United States; Dennis Fenton; Morris Fisher; Willis A. Lee; Carl Osburn; Lloyd Spooner	Norway; Albert Helgerud; Otto Olsen; Østen Østensen; Gudbrand Skatteboe; Olaf Sletten	Switzerland; Gustave Amoudruz; Ulrich Fahrner; Fritz Kuchen; Werner Schneeberger; Bernard Siegenthaler
300 m military rifle, prone	Otto Olsen; Norway	Léon Johnson; France	Fritz Kuchen; Switzerland
Team 300 m military rifle, prone	United States; Morris Fisher; Joseph Jackson; Willis A. Lee; Carl Osburn; Lloyd Spooner	France; Léon Johnson; André Parmentier; Achille Paroche; Georges Roes; Émile Rumeau	Finland; Voitto Kolho; Kalle Lappalainen; Veli Nieminen; Vilho Vauhkonen; Magnus Wegelius
300 m military rifle, standing	Carl Osburn; United States	Lars Jørgen Madsen; Denmark	Lawrence Nuesslein; United States
Team 300 m military rifle, standing	Denmark; Niels Larsen; Lars Jørgen Madsen; Anders Peter Nielsen; Anders Petersen; Erik Sætter-Lassen	United States; Thomas Brown; Willis A. Lee; Lawrence Nuesslein; Carl Osburn; Lloyd Spooner	Sweden; Olle Ericsson; Mauritz Eriksson; Walfrid Hellman; Hugo Johansson; Leon Lagerlöf
600 m military rifle, prone	Hugo Johansson; Sweden	Mauritz Eriksson; Sweden	Lloyd Spooner; United States
Team 600 m military rifle, prone	United States; Dennis Fenton; Joseph Jackson; Willis A. Lee; Oliver Schriver; Lloyd Spooner	South Africa; Robert Bodley; Ferdinand Buchanan; George Harvey; Fred Morgan; David Smith	Sweden; Erik Blomqvist; Mauritz Eriksson; Hugo Johansson; Gustaf Adolf Jonsson; Erik Ohlsson
Team 300 + 600 m military rifle, prone	United States; Joseph Jackson; Willis A. Lee; Carl Osburn; Oliver Schriver; Lloyd Spooner	Norway; Albert Helgerud; Otto Olsen; Jacob Onsrud; Østen Østensen; Olaf Sletten	Switzerland; Eugene Addor; Joseph Jehle; Fritz Kuchen; Werner Schneeberger; Weibel
100 m running deer, single shots	Otto Olsen; Norway	Alfred Swahn; Sweden	Harald Natvig; Norway
Team 100 m running deer, single shots	Norway; Einar Liberg; Ole Lilloe-Olsen; Harald Natvig; Hans Nordvik; Otto Olsen	Finland; Yrjö Kolho; Kalle Lappalainen; Toivo Tikkanen; Nestori Toivonen; Magnus Wegelius	United States; Thomas Brown; Willis A. Lee; Lawrence Nuesslein; Carl Osburn; Lloyd Spooner
100 m running deer, double shots	Ole Lilloe-Olsen; Norway	Fredric Landelius; Sweden	Einar Liberg; Norway
Team 100 m running deer, double shots	Norway; Thorstein Johansen; Einar Liberg; Ole Lilloe-Olsen; Harald Natvig; Hans Nordvik	Sweden; Edward Benedicks; Bengt Lagercrantz; Fredric Landelius; Alfred Swahn; Oscar Swahn	Finland; Yrjö Kolho; Toivo Tikkanen; Nestori Toivonen; Vilho Vauhkonen; Magnus Wegelius
Trap	Mark Arie; United States	Frank Troeh; United States	Frank Wright; United States
Team trap	United States; Mark Arie; Horace Bonser; Jay Clark; Forest McNeir; Frank Troeh; Frank Wright	Belgium; Albert Bosquet; Joseph Cogels; Émile Dupont; Edouard Fesinger; Henri Quersin; Louis Van Tilt	Sweden; Per Kinde; Fredric Landelius; Erik Lundquist; Karl Richter; Erik Sökjer-Petersén; Alfred Swahn

== Participating nations ==
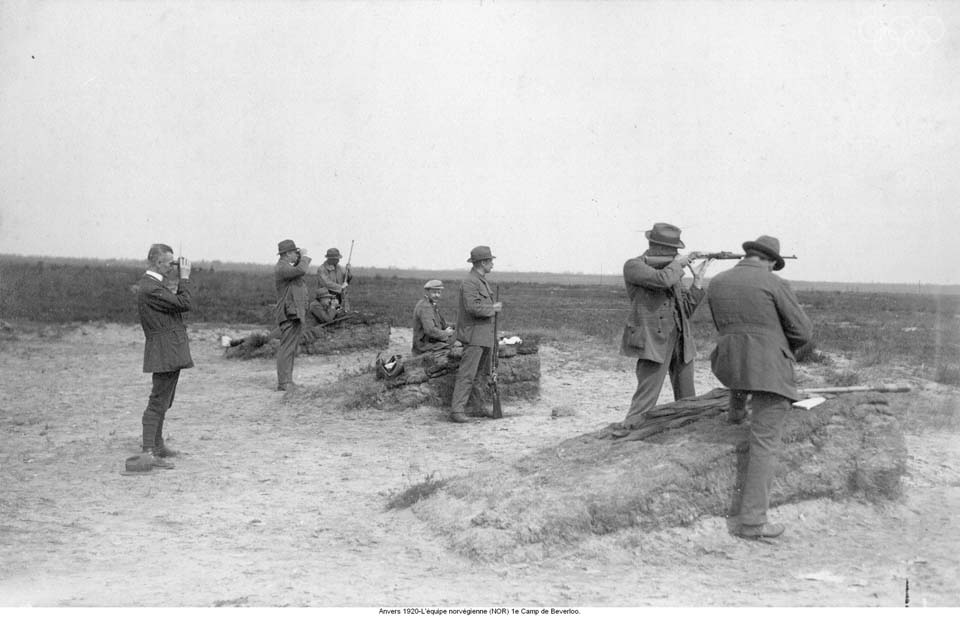
The Norwegian team

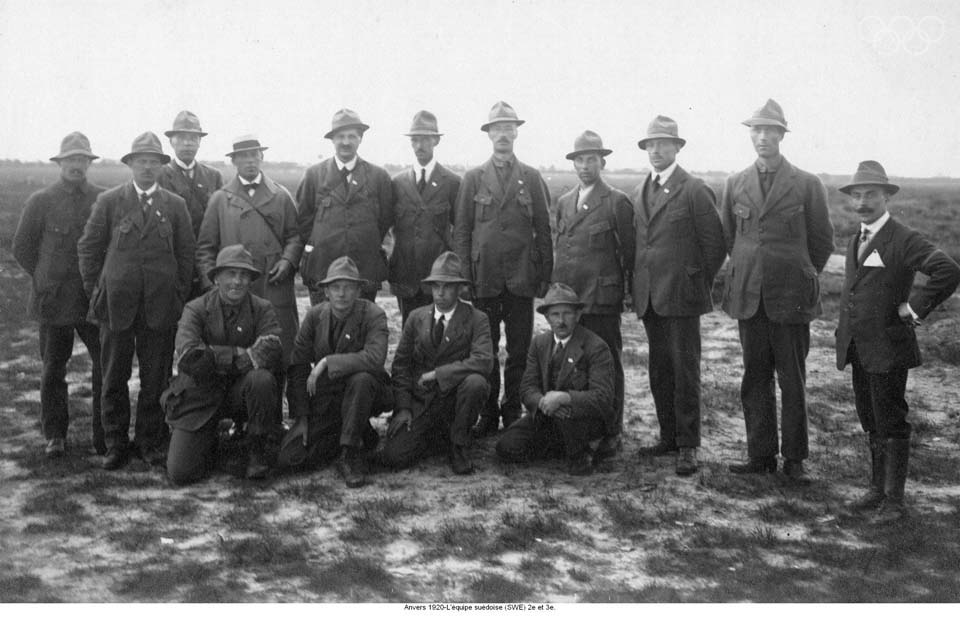
The Swedish team

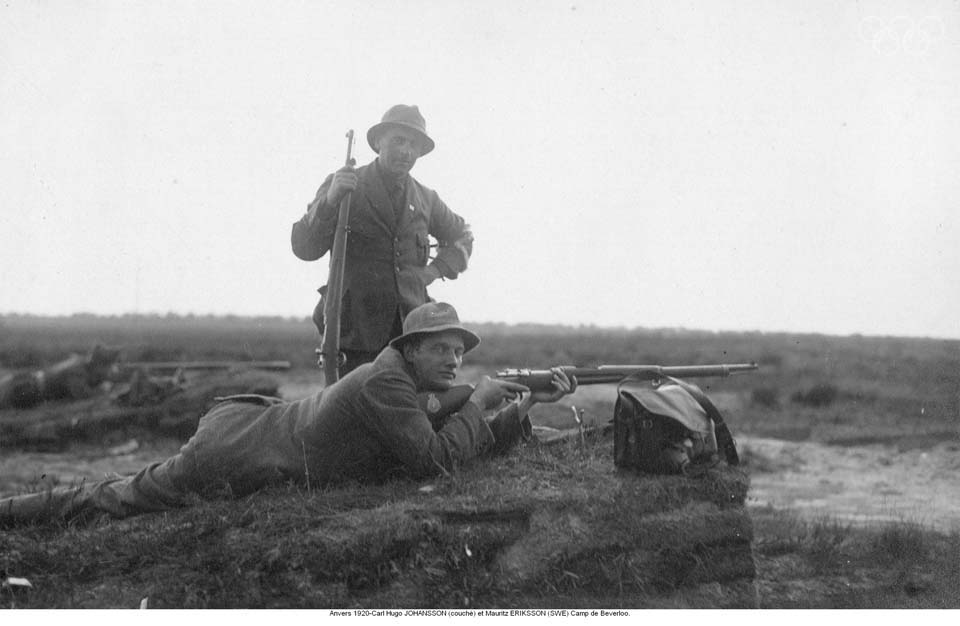
Carl Johansson and Mauritz Eriksson

A total of 234 shooters from 18 nations competed at the Antwerp Games:

- Belgium (29)
- Brazil (5)
- Canada (7)
- Czechoslovakia (8)
- Denmark (15)
- Finland (9)
- France (17)
- Great Britain (7)
- Greece (9)
- Italy (10)
- Netherlands (15)
- Norway (16)
- Portugal (5)
- South Africa (7)
- Spain (7)
- Sweden (28)
- Switzerland (15)
- United States (29)

== Medal table ==
Rank	Nation	Gold	Silver	Bronze	Total
1	United States	13	4	6	23
2	Norway	5	2	4	11
3	Sweden	1	6	3	10
4	Denmark	1	2	0	3
5	Brazil	1	1	1	3
6	France	0	2	0	2
7	Finland	0	1	2	3
8	Belgium	0	1	0	1
8	Greece	0	1	0	1
8	South Africa	0	1	0	1
11	Switzerland	0	0	5	5
Totals (11 entries)		21	21	21	63
