= Greece at the 1920 Summer Olympics =

- IOC code: GRE
- NOC: Committee of the Olympic Games

in Antwerp Belgium
- Competitors: 47 in 8 sports
- Flag bearer: Vasilios Zarkadis
- Medals Ranked 19th: Gold 0 Silver 1 Bronze 0 Total 1

Summer Olympics appearances (overview)
- 1896; 1900; 1904; 1908; 1912; 1920; 1924; 1928; 1932; 1936; 1948; 1952; 1956; 1960; 1964; 1968; 1972; 1976; 1980; 1984; 1988; 1992; 1996; 2000; 2004; 2008; 2012; 2016; 2020; 2024; 2028

Other related appearances
- 1906 Intercalated Games

Greece competed at the 1920 Summer Olympics in Antwerp, Belgium. 47 competitors, all men, took part in 34 events in 8 sports. Greek athletes have competed in every Summer Olympic Games.

== Medalists ==
Medal	Name	Sport	Event	Date
Silver	Georgios Moraitinis; Iason Sappas; Alexandros Theofilakis; Ioannis Theofilakis; Alexandros Vrasivanopoulos	Shooting	Men's 30 m team military pistol	August 3

== Aquatics ==
=== Water polo ===
Greece competed in the Olympic water polo tournament for the first time in 1920. The Bergvall System was in use at the time. Greece was shut out by the United States in the quarterfinals. It is unclear why the Greeks received a place in the third-place tournament, as the Americans had not won either gold or silver, but Greece beat Italy in the quarterfinals of the bronze medal tournament before losing again to the United States in the bronze semifinals.

Quarterfinals

United States	7–0	Greece	Antwerp

Bronze medal quarterfinals

Greece	5–1	Italy	Antwerp

Bronze medal semifinals

United States	7–0	Greece	Antwerp

Final rank
5th

== Athletics ==
Nine athletes represented Greece in 1920. It was the nation's sixth appearance in athletics, having competed in the sport at every Olympics. The Stockholm Games were only the second time that no Greek won a medal in athletics.

Ranks given are within the heat.

Athlete	Event	Heats		Quarterfinals		Semifinals		Final	
Athlete	Event	Result	Rank	Result	Rank	Result	Rank	Result	Rank
Dimitrios Andromidas	110 m hurdles	N/A		Unknown	5	did not advance			
Dimitrios Andromidas	High jump	1.65	16	N/A				did not advance	
Dimitrios Andromidas	Pentathlon	N/A						did not finish	
Dimitrios Andromidas	Decathlon	N/A						did not finish	
Dimitrios Karambatis	100 m	Unknown	4	did not advance					
Dimitrios Karambatis	200 m	24.2	3	did not advance					
Alexandros Kranis	5000 m	N/A				Unknown	6	did not advance	
Alexandros Kranis	10000 m	N/A				Unknown	7	did not advance	
Alexandros Kranis	Cross country	N/A						Unknown	38
Apostolos Nikolaidis	Decathlon	N/A						did not finish	
Menelaos Ponireas	Triple jump	12.60	18	N/A				did not advance	
Panagiotis Retelas	5000 m	N/A				did not finish		did not advance	
Konstantinos Roubesis	Pentathlon	N/A						did not finish	
Iraklis Sakellaropoulos	Marathon	N/A						3:14:25.0	32
Panagiotis Trivoulidas	Marathon	N/A						did not finish	
Panagiotis Trivoulidas	Cross country	N/A						Unknown	39

== Fencing ==
Three fencers represented Greece in 1920. It was the nation's third appearance in the sport.

Ranks given are within the group.

Fencer	Event	First round		Quarterfinals		Semifinals		Final	
Fencer	Event	Result	Rank	Result	Rank	Result	Rank	Result	Rank
S. Antonidas	Épée	4–5	5 Q	3–8	11	did not advance			
Evangelos Skotidas	Épée	4–3	2 Q	5–6	7	did not advance			
Evangelos Skotidas	Sabre	N/A		3–4	5	did not advance			
Vasilios Zarkadis	Épée	1–7	8	did not advance					
Vasilios Zarkadis	Sabre	N/A		4–4	5	did not advance			

== Football ==
Greece competed in the Olympic football tournament for the first time. The country was defeated in the first round by Sweden.

Team Roster

- Ioannis Andrianopoulos
- Theodoros Dimitriou
- Antonios Fotiadis
- Agamemnon Gilis
- Dimitrios Gotis
- Georgios Kalafatis
- Nikolaos Kaloudis
- Georgios Khatziandreou
- Apostolos Nikolaidis
- Theodoros Nikolaidis
- Khristos Peppas
- Reserve:Dimitris Demertzis
- Reserve:Ioannis Stavropoulos
- Reserve:Vassilis Samios
- Reserve:Sotiris Despotopoulos
- Reserve:Georgio Andrianopoulos

First round

28 August 1920

Sweden	9–0	Greece
Olsson 4' 79'; Karlsson 15' 20' 21' 51' 85'; Wicksell 25'; Dahl 31'	Report

Olympisch Stadion, Antwerp
Attendance: 5,000
Referee: Charles Barette (BEL)

Final rank
10th

== Shooting ==
Nine shooters represented Greece in 1920. It was the nation's fourth appearance in the sport. Greece took a silver medal in the team military pistol, its first medal in shooting since 1896.

Shooter	Event	Final	
Shooter	Event	Result	Rank
Konstantinos Kefalas	50 m small-bore rifle	Unknown	
Georgios Moraitinis	300 m free rifle, 3 pos.	Unknown	
Emmanouil Peristerakis	50 m small-bore rifle	Unknown	
Iason Sappas	50 m free pistol	464	8
Iason Sappas	300 m free rifle, 3 pos.	Unknown	
Alexandros Theofilakis	300 m free rifle, 3 pos.	Unknown	
Ioannis Theofilakis	50 m free pistol	462	10
Ioannis Theofilakis	50 m small-bore rifle	Unknown	
Ioannis Theofilakis	300 m free rifle, 3 pos.	Unknown	
Ioannis Theofilakis	600 m military rifle, prone	59	4
Andreas Vikhos (Note: also competed at the 1924 Summer Olympics)	50 m small-bore rifle	Unknown	
Alexandros Vrasivanopoulos	300 m free rifle, 3 pos.	Unknown	
Vasileios Xylinakis	50 m small-bore rifle	Unknown	
Konstantinos Kefalas; Emmanouil Peristerakis; Alexandros Theofilakis; Ioannis Theofilakis; Andreas Vikhos	300 m team military rifle, prone	270	11
Konstantinos Kefalas; Emmanouil Peristerakis; Alexandros Theofilakis; Ioannis Theofilakis; Andreas Vikhos	600 m team military rifle, prone	270	7
Konstantinos Kefalas; Emmanouil Peristerakis; Alexandros Theofilakis; Ioannis Theofilakis; Vasileios Xylinakis	300 & 600 m team military rifle, prone	553	7
Konstantinos Kefalas; Emmanouil Peristerakis; Ioannis Theofilakis; Andreas Vikhos; Vasileios Xylinakis	50 m team small-bore rifle	1727	10
Konstantinos Kefalas; Emmanouil Peristerakis; Ioannis Theofilakis; Andreas Vikhos; Vasileios Xylinakis	300 m team military rifle, standing	209	13
Georgios Moraitinis; Iason Sappas; Alexandros Theofilakis; Ioannis Theofilakis; Alexandros Vrasivanopoulos	30 m team military pistol	1285	2nd place, silver medalist(s)
Georgios Moraitinis; Iason Sappas; Alexandros Theofilakis; Ioannis Theofilakis; Alexandros Vrasivanopoulos	50 m team free pistol	2240	4
Georgios Moraitinis; Iason Sappas; Alexandros Theofilakis; Ioannis Theofilakis; Alexandros Vrasivanopoulos	Team free rifle	3910	13

== Tennis ==
A single tennis player, in the men's singles, competed for Greece in 1920. It was the nation's second appearance in the sport, and first since 1896. Zerlentis lost his first match, though that single match took 66 games over 4 sets to complete.

Player	Event	Round of 64	Round of 32	Round of 16	Quarterfinals	Semifinals	Finals	Rank
Player	Event	Opposition Score	Opposition Score	Opposition Score	Opposition Score	Opposition Score	Opposition Score	Rank
Athanasios Zerlentis	Men's singles	Bye	Lowe (GBR); L 14–12, 8–10, 7–5, 6–4	did not advance				17

Opponent nation	Wins	Losses	Percent
Great Britain	0	1	.000
Total	0	1	.000

Round	Wins	Losses	Percent
Round of 64	0	0	–
Round of 32	0	1	.000
Round of 16	0	0	–
Quarterfinals	0	0	–
Semifinals	0	0	–
Final	0	0	–
Bronze match	0	0	–
Total	0	1	.000

== Weightlifting ==
A single weightlifter represented Greece in 1920. It was the nation's third appearance in the sport, in which Greece was the only country to have competed at both prior appearances in 1896 and 1900.

Weightlifter	Event	Final	
Weightlifter	Event	Result	Rank
Evangelos Menexis	67.5 kg	205.0	10

== Wrestling ==
Five wrestlers competed for Greece in 1920. It was the nation's third appearance in the sport. Notaris was the only one to win a match. Both Dialetis and Vergos competed in both freestyle and Greco-Roman.

=== Freestyle ===
Wrestler	Event	Round of 32	Round of 16	Quarterfinals	Semifinals	Finals / Bronze match	Rank
Ioannis Dialetis	Featherweight	N/A	Ackerly (USA) (L)	did not advance			9
Dimitrios Vergos	Middleweight	Bye	Borgström (SWE) (L)	did not advance			9

Opponent nation	Wins	Losses	Percent
Sweden	0	1	.000
United States	0	1	.000
Total	0	2	.000

Round	Wins	Losses	Percent
Round of 32	0	0	–
Round of 16	0	2	.000
Quarterfinals	0	0	–
Semifinals	0	0	–
Final	0	0	–
Bronze match	0	0	–
Total	0	2	.000

=== Greco-Roman ===
Wrestler	Event	Round of 32	Round of 16	Quarterfinals	Semifinals	Finals	Rank
Wrestler	Event	Round of 32	Round of 16	Silver quarters	Silver semis	Silver match	Rank
Wrestler	Event	Round of 32	Round of 16	Bronze quarters	Bronze semis	Bronze match	Rank
Ioannis Dialetis	Featherweight	Brian (USA) (L)	did not advance	did not advance			17
Ioannis Dialetis	Featherweight	Brian (USA) (L)	did not advance	N/A	did not advance		17
Ioannis Dialetis	Featherweight	Brian (USA) (L)	did not advance	did not advance			17
Sotirios Notaris	Middleweight	Müller (EST) (W)	Stensrud (NOR) (L)	did not advance			13
Sotirios Notaris	Middleweight	Müller (EST) (W)	Stensrud (NOR) (L)	did not advance			13
Sotirios Notaris	Middleweight	Müller (EST) (W)	Stensrud (NOR) (L)	did not advance			13
Vasilios Pavlidis	Lightweight	Frisenfeldt (DEN) (L)	did not advance	did not advance			18
Vasilios Pavlidis	Lightweight	Frisenfeldt (DEN) (L)	did not advance	did not advance			18
Vasilios Pavlidis	Lightweight	Frisenfeldt (DEN) (L)	did not advance	did not advance			18
Dimitrios Vergos	Heavyweight	Bye	Sjouwerman (NED) (L)	did not advance			12
Dimitrios Vergos	Heavyweight	Bye	Sjouwerman (NED) (L)	did not advance			12
Dimitrios Vergos	Heavyweight	Bye	Sjouwerman (NED) (L)	did not advance			12
Vasilios Vouyoukos	Lightweight	Bye	Metropoulos (USA) (L)	did not advance			12
Vasilios Vouyoukos	Lightweight	Bye	Metropoulos (USA) (L)	did not advance			12
Vasilios Vouyoukos	Lightweight	Bye	Metropoulos (USA) (L)	did not advance			12

Opponent nation	Wins	Losses	Percent
Denmark	0	1	.000
Estonia	1	0	1.000
Netherlands	0	1	.000
Norway	0	1	.000
United States	0	2	.000
Total	1	5	.167

Round	Wins	Losses	Percent
Round of 32	1	2	.333
Round of 16	0	3	.000
Quarterfinals	0	0	–
Semifinals	0	0	–
Final	0	0	–
Silver quarterfinals	0	0	–
Silver semifinals	0	0	–
Silver match	0	0	–
Bronze quarterfinals	0	0	–
Bronze semifinals	0	0	–
Bronze match	0	0	–
Total	1	5	.167
