= Switzerland at the 1920 Summer Olympics =

- IOC code: SUI
- NOC: Swiss Olympic Association

in Antwerp
- Competitors: 77 in 13 sports
- Flag bearer: Luigi Antognini
- Medals Ranked 13th: Gold 2 Silver 2 Bronze 7 Total 11

Summer Olympics appearances (overview)
- 1896; 1900; 1904; 1908; 1912; 1920; 1924; 1928; 1932; 1936; 1948; 1952; 1956; 1960; 1964; 1968; 1972; 1976; 1980; 1984; 1988; 1992; 1996; 2000; 2004; 2008; 2012; 2016; 2020; 2024

Other related appearances
- 1906 Intercalated Games

Switzerland competed at the 1920 Summer Olympics in Antwerp, Belgium. 77 competitors, all men, took part in 45 events in 13 sports.

== Medalists ==
=== Gold ===
- Willy Brüderlin, Max Rudolf, Paul Rudolf, Hans Walter and Paul Staub — Rowing, Men's four with coxswain(4+)
- Robert Roth — Wrestling, Freestyle heavyweight

=== Silver ===
- Fritz Hünenberger — Weightlifting, Light heavyweight
- Charles Courant — Wrestling, Freestyle light heavyweight

=== Bronze ===
- Édouard Candeveau, Alfred Felber and Paul Piaget — Rowing, Men's pair with coxswain (2+)
- Fritz Zulauf — Shooting, Men's 30m military pistol
- Fritz Kuchen, Albert Tröndle, Arnold Rösli, Walter Lienhard and Caspar Widmer — Shooting, Men's team military rifle, 300m + 600m
- Fritz Zulauf, Joseph Jehle, Gustave Amoudruz, Hans Egli and Domenico Giambonini — Shooting, Men's team 30m military pistol
- Fritz Kuchen — Shooting, Men's 300m military rifle, prone
- Eugène Ryter — Weightlifting, Featherweight

== Aquatics ==
=== Diving ===
A single diver represented Switzerland in 1920. It was the nation's debut in the sport. Knuchel competed in the springboard event, but was unable to advance to the final.

Men

Ranks given are within the semifinal group.

Diver	Event	Semifinals			Final		
Diver	Event	Points	Score	Rank	Points	Score	Rank
Paul Knuchel	3 m springboard	33	431.35	7	did not advance		

=== Swimming ===
Four swimmers, all men, represented Switzerland in 1920. It was the nation's debut in the sport. None of the swimmers advanced to an event final.

Ranks given are within the heat.

Men

Swimmer	Event	Quarterfinals		Semifinals		Final	
Swimmer	Event	Result	Rank	Result	Rank	Result	Rank
Henri Demiéville	400 m breast	7:12.4	2 Q	Unknown	4	did not advance	
Hans Drexler	1500 m free	Unknown	4	did not advance			
Jean Jenni	100 m free	Unknown	5	did not advance			
René Ricolfi-Doria	400 m free	Unknown	5	did not advance			
René Ricolfi-Doria	1500 m free	did not finish		did not advance			

=== Water polo ===
Switzerland competed in the Olympic water polo tournament for the first time in 1920. A modified version of the Bergvall System was in use at the time. Switzerland lost heavily to Belgium in the opening round. Because Belgium eventually finished with the silver medal, Switzerland should have had a chance to play for the bronze; it is not clear why they did not.

Round of 16

Belgium	11–0	Switzerland	Antwerp

Final rank
9th

== Athletics ==
13 athletes represented Switzerland in 1920. It was the nation's fourth appearance in athletics. A pair of ninth-place finishes were the team's best results.

Ranks given are within the heat.

Athlete	Event	Heats		Quarterfinals		Semifinals		Final	
Athlete	Event	Result	Rank	Result	Rank	Result	Rank	Result	Rank
Stanislas Anselmetti	3 km walk	N/A				Disqualified		did not advance	
Stanislas Anselmetti	10 km walk	N/A				did not finish		did not advance	
Luigi Antognini	Shot put	10.32	19	N/A				did not advance	
Constant Bucher	Decathlon	N/A						5273.280	10
Oscar Garin	10000 m	N/A				33:04.4	5 Q		9
Alfred Gaschen	5000 m	N/A				15:38.0	6	did not finish	
Alfred Gaschen	10000 m	N/A				34:38.4	5 Q	did not advance	
Ernst Gerspach	Decathlon	N/A						5947.780	9
Josef Imbach	100 m	11.0	2 Q	11.1	3	did not advance			
Josef Imbach	200 m	23.5	2 Q	23.1	2 Q	did not finish		did not advance	
Hans Kindler	Long jump	6.34	15	N/A				did not advance	
Paul Martin	800 m	N/A		1:59.8	5	did not advance			
Willi Moser	110 m hurdles	N/A		did not finish		did not advance			
August Waibel	100 m		4	did not advance					
August Waibel	200 m		4	did not advance					
Josef Imbach; Walter Leibundgut; Adolf Rysler; August Waibel	4 × 100 m relay	N/A				44.2	4	did not advance	

== Boxing ==
A single boxer represented Switzerland at the 1920 Games. It was the nation's debut in boxing. Reichenbach lost his first match, in the welterweight round of 16.

Boxer	Weight class	Round of 32	Round of 16	Quarterfinals	Semifinals	Final / Bronze match	
Boxer	Weight class	Opposition Score	Opposition Score	Opposition Score	Opposition Score	Opposition Score	Rank
Willy Reichenbach	Welterweight	Bye	Ireland (GBR); L	did not advance			9

Opponent nation	Wins	Losses	Percent
Great Britain	0	1	.000
Total	0	1	.000

Round	Wins	Losses	Percent
Round of 32	0	0	–
Round of 16	0	1	.000
Quarterfinals	0	0	–
Semifinals	0	0	–
Final	0	0	–
Bronze match	0	0	–
Total	0	1	.000

== Fencing ==
Eight fencers represented Switzerland in 1920. It was the nation's fourth appearance in the sport. Switzerland competed only in the épée competitions. Edouard Fitting was the only Swiss fencer to advance to the quarterfinals, where he was eliminated. The team was much more successful than any of the individuals, advancing to the finals before finishing in fifth overall.

Ranks given are within the group.

Fencer	Event	First round		Quarterfinals		Semifinals		Final	
Fencer	Event	Result	Rank	Result	Rank	Result	Rank	Result	Rank
Louis de Tribolet	Épée	3–5	6	did not advance					
Eugène Empeyta	Épée	3–5	6	did not advance					
Edouard Fitting	Épée	5–4	3 Q	3–7	8	did not advance			
Frédéric Fitting	Épée	2–5	7	did not advance					
Henri Jacquet	Épée	2–6	8	did not advance					
John Albaret; Louis de Tribolet; Eugène Empeyta; Édouard Fitting; Frédéric Fitting; Henri Jacquet; Léopold Montagnier; Franz Wilhelm	Team épée	N/A				3–1	2 Q	1–4	5

== Ice hockey ==
Switzerland competed in the inaugural Olympic ice hockey tournament. The team suffered the most lopsided loss of the tournament in a 29–0 defeat by the United States in the quarterfinals, Switzerland's first match. The American team's eventual winning of the silver medal qualified Switzerland for the bronze medal tournament. In the bronze medal semifinals, the Swiss played a closer game but still lost to Sweden, 4–0.

Roster

Coach: (Switzerland) Max Sillig

Pos	Player	GP	G	Birthdate	Age
F	Rodolphe Cuendet	1	0		
R	Louis Dufour Jr.	2	0	July 26, 1901	18
F	Max Holzboer	1	0		
D	Marius Jaccard	2	0	March 27, 1898	22
F	Bruno Leuzinger	1	0	January 6, 1886	34
D	Paul Lob	2	0	July 13, 1893	26
G	René Savoie	2	0	February 9, 1896	24
F	Max Sillig	1	0	November 19, 1873	46
F	Walter von Siebenthal	1	0	June 6, 1899	20
D	Louis Dufour Sr.	1	0	1873	~47

Gold medal quarterfinals

24 April 1920; 17:00	United States	29 – 0 (15–0, 14–0)	Switzerland	Palais de Glace d'Anvers

Game reference
Ray Bonney	Goalies	René Savoie	Referee: (United States) Raoul Le Mat
Conroy (8); J. McCormick (7); Drury (6); Goheen (6); Fitzgerald; Tuck / Goals			Referee: (United States) Raoul Le Mat
7 min	Penalties	0 min	Referee: (United States) Raoul Le Mat

Bronze medal semifinals

28 April 1920; 23:30	Sweden	4 – 0 (0–0, 4–0)	Switzerland	Palais de Glace d'Anvers

Game reference

Abbe Jansson
Goalies
René Savoie
Referee:
(Canada) Frank Fredrickson

Säfwenberg	1 – 0
Johansson	2 – 0
Arwe	3 – 0
Arwe	4 – 0

0 min
Penalties
0 min

Final rank
5th (Tied)

== Rowing ==
Thirteen rowers represented Switzerland in 1920. It was the nation's debut in the sport. Two of the four boats won medals, with the coxed fours team taking gold and the coxed pairs taking bronze.

Ranks given are within the heat.

Rower	Cox	Event	Quarterfinals		Semifinals		Final	
Rower	Cox	Event	Result	Rank	Result	Rank	Result	Rank
Max Schmid	N/A	Single sculls	7:49.0	2	did not advance			
Édouard Candeveau; Alfred Felber	Paul Piaget	Coxed pair	N/A		8:50.0	1 Q	Unknown	3rd place, bronze medalist(s)
Willy Brüderlin; Max Rudolf; Paul Rudolf; Hans Walter	Paul Staub	Coxed four	N/A		7:03.0	1 Q	6:54.0	1st place, gold medalist(s)
P. Baur; Rudolf Bosshard; Willy Brüderlin; Charles Freuler; Max Rudolf; Paul Rudolf; Franz Türler; Hans Walter	Paul Staub	Eight	6:21.4	2	did not advance			

== Skating ==
=== Figure skating ===
A single figure skater represented Switzerland in 1920. It was the nation's debut in the sport. Megroz took eighth place out of nine skaters in the men's singles.

Skater	Event	Final	
Skater	Event	Result	Rank
Alfred Megroz	Men's singles	52.5	8

== Shooting ==
Fifteen shooters represented Switzerland in 1920. It was the nation's third appearance in the sport, and first since 1900. The team's five bronze medals gave Switzerland the fourth-most total medals in 1920, but put them behind ten other teams who had won at least one gold or silver.

Shooter	Event	Final	
Shooter	Event	Result	Rank
Gustave Amoudruz	300 m free rifle, 3 pos.	959	Unknown
Ulrich Fahrner	300 m free rifle, 3 pos.	947	Unknown
Fritz Kuchen	300 m free rifle, 3 pos.	961	Unknown
Fritz Kuchen	300 m military rifle, prone	59	3rd place, bronze medalist(s)
Werner Schneeberger	300 m free rifle, 3 pos.	947	Unknown
Bernard Siegenthaler	300 m free rifle, 3 pos.	906	Unknown
Fritz Zulauf	30 m military pistol	269	3rd place, bronze medalist(s)
Eugene Addor; Joseph Jehle; Fritz Kuchen; Werner Schneeberger; Weibel	300 & 600 m team military rifle, prone	563	3rd place, bronze medalist(s)
Gustave Amoudruz; Hans Egli; Domenico Giambonini; Joseph Jehle; Fritz Zulauf	30 m team military pistol	1270	3rd place, bronze medalist(s)
Gustave Amoudruz; Hans Egli; Domenico Giambonini; Bernard Siegenthaler; Fritz Zulauf	50 m team free pistol	2136	9
Gustave Amoudruz; Ulrich Fahrner; Fritz Kuchen; Werner Schneeberger; Bernard Siegenthaler	Team free rifle	4698	3rd place, bronze medalist(s)
Fritz Kuchen; Walter Lienhard; Arnold Rösli; Albert Tröndle; Caspar Widmer	300 m team military rifle, prone	281	4
Fritz Kuchen; Walter Lienhard; Arnold Rösli; Albert Tröndle; Caspar Widmer	300 m team military rifle, standing	234	8
Fritz Kuchen; Walter Lienhard; Arnold Rösli; Albert Tröndle; Caspar Widmer	600 m team military rifle, prone	279	6

== Tennis ==
Three tennis players, all men, competed for Switzerland in 1920. It was the nation's debut in the sport. Simon was the only one of the Swiss players to win a match; Syz and Chiesa each lost their first, as did the Simon and Syz pair in the doubles.

Player	Event	Round of 64	Round of 32	Round of 16	Quarterfinals	Semifinals	Finals	Rank
Player	Event	Opposition Score	Opposition Score	Opposition Score	Opposition Score	Opposition Score	Opposition Score	Rank
Alberto Henri Chiesa	Men's singles	Bye	Brugnon (FRA); W 6–4, 7–5, 6–4	did not advance				17
Armand Simon	Men's singles	Bye	de Satrústegui (ESP); W 3–6, 8–6, 6–2, 6–8, 6–2	Malström (SWE); L 6–2, 6–2, 6–0	did not advance			9
Hans Syz	Men's singles	Lammens (BEL); L 6–3, 6–4, 3–6, 7–5	did not advance					32
Armand Simon; Hans Syz	Men's doubles	N/A	Bye	Balbi & Colombo (ITA); L 6–3, 7–5, 3–6, 6–4	did not advance			9

Opponent nation	Wins	Losses	Percent
Belgium	0	1	.000
France	0	1	.000
Italy	0	1	.000
Spain	1	0	1.000
Sweden	0	1	.000
Total	1	4	.200

Round	Wins	Losses	Percent
Round of 64	0	1	.000
Round of 32	1	1	.500
Round of 16	0	2	.000
Quarterfinals	0	0	–
Semifinals	0	0	–
Final	0	0	–
Bronze match	0	0	–
Total	1	4	.200

== Weightlifting ==
Two weightlifters represented Switzerland in 1920. It was the nation's debut in the sport. Both men won medals, though neither was able to take a gold.

Weightlifter	Event	Final	
Weightlifter	Event	Result	Rank
Fridriech Hünenberger	82.5 kg	275.0	2nd place, silver medalist(s)
Eugène Ryter	60 kg	210.0	3rd place, bronze medalist(s)

== Wrestling ==
Four wrestlers, all in the freestyle discipline, competed for Switzerland in 1920. It was the nation's debut in the sport. Roth took the gold medal in the unlimited weight class, with Courant taking silver in the light heavyweight.

=== Freestyle ===
Wrestler	Event	Round of 32	Round of 16	Quarterfinals	Semifinals	Finals / Bronze match	Rank
Léonard Bron	Middleweight	Bye	Leino (FIN) (L)	did not advance			9
Charles Courant	Light heavyweight	N/A	Bye	van Rensburg (RSA) (W)	Redman (USA) (W)	Larsson (SWE) (L)	2nd place, silver medalist(s)
Daniel Kaiser	Featherweight	N/A	Bye	Ackerly (USA) (L)	did not advance		5
Robert Roth	Heavyweight	N/A		Salila (FIN) (W)	Meyer (USA) (W)	Pendleton (USA) (W)	1st place, gold medalist(s)

Opponent nation	Wins	Losses	Percent
Finland	1	1	.500
South Africa	1	0	1.000
Sweden	0	1	.000
United States	3	1	.750
Total	5	3	.625

Round	Wins	Losses	Percent
Round of 32	0	0	–
Round of 16	0	1	.000
Quarterfinals	2	1	.667
Semifinals	2	0	1.000
Final	1	1	.500
Bronze match	0	0	–
Total	5	3	.625
