= Sport in Greece =

Greece has risen to prominence in a number of sporting areas in recent decades. Football in particular has seen a rapid transformation, with the Greece national football team winning the UEFA Euro 2004. Many Greek athletes have also achieved significant success and have won world and olympic titles in numerous sports during the years, such as basketball, wrestling, water polo, athletics, weightlifting, with many of them becoming international stars inside their sports. The successful organisation of the Athens 2004 Olympic and Paralympic Games led also to the further development of many sports and has led to the creation of many world class sport venues all over Greece and especially in Athens. Greek athletes have won a total 169 medals for Greece in 17 different Olympic sports at the Summer Olympic Games, including the Intercalated Games, an achievement which makes Greece one of the top nations globally, in the world's rankings of medals per capital

== History of Ancient Greek Sports ==
The Archaic Age (c. 750–500 B.C.E.), especially the sixth century, was the formative age of Greek sport with city-state (polis) formation, colonization, the adoption of money, and other socioeconomic changes. When Archaic Greeks founded new colonies as independent city-states from the Black Sea to Sicily, they took their games with them, and soon they returned to watch or compete at Olympia and other sites. Interactions between dispersed Greeks and the Greek mainland raise interesting questions of ethnicity and status displayed as groups used sport for propaganda and legitimization. Like modern expansion franchises, new city-states abroad established local games to display their ethnic legitimacy, resources, and status, and they competed for prestige as homes of victors, festivals, and patrons of the sport. Sophisticated and broad, Hornblower and Morgan’s volume uses Pindar and other sources to show that athletic prestige was sought by individuals, families, and communities all over the Greek Mediterranean. Essays on regions prominent in Pindar (e.g., Argos, Corinth, Aegina, Thessaly) discuss the influence of local patronage, the regional dimensions of victory odes, and Pindar’s adaptation of local myth-historical imagery. The work also covers Western colonial elites, the tyrants of Sicily, and Greek sport in Hellenistic Egypt and the Roman Empire. 24 Applying New Historicism to Pindar, Nicholson examines the poetics of representation and omission as victors and poets attempted to re-create realities for personal and political ends. Elites and tyrants displayed their wealth and status by personal athletic competition or indirectly via equestrian events in which hired or slave drivers risked injury but the owners claimed the victories. Nicholson argues that socioeconomic changes brought challenges by non-elite citizens in Archaic and Classical Greece, moving anxious aristocrats to minimize the contributions of hired charioteers and jockeys, and paid trainers, in their victory commemorations (odes, dedications, and vases).

== Olympic Games ==
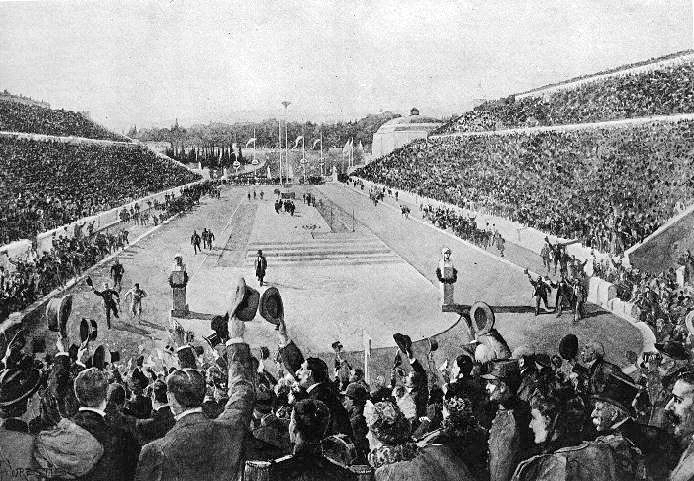
Spyridon Louis entering the Kallimarmaron Stadium at the end of the marathon of 1896 Summer Olympics.

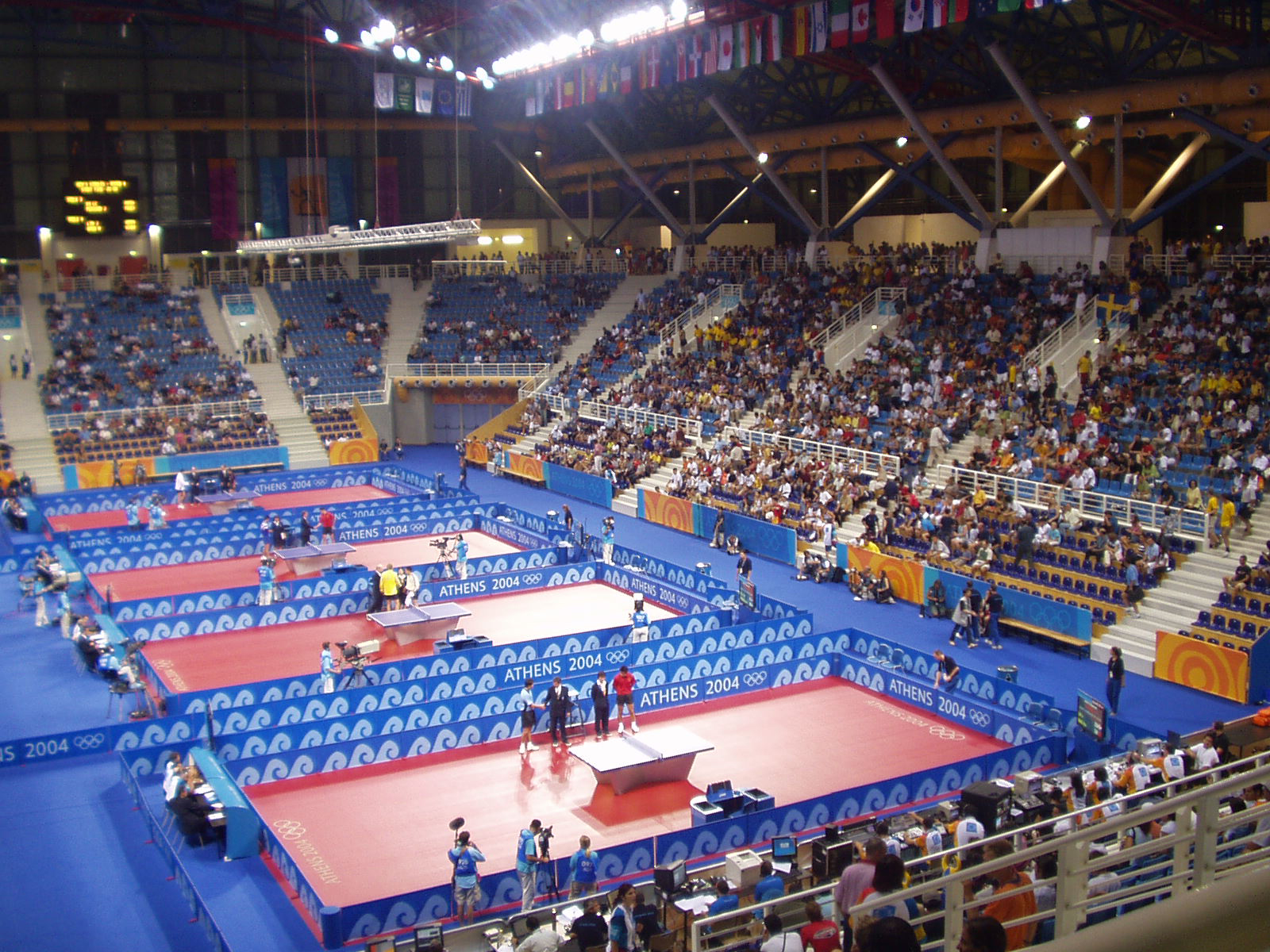
Galatsi Olympic Hall during the 2004 Summer Olympics.

Greece was home of the ancient Olympic Games, first recorded in 776 BC in Olympia, and hosted the modern Olympic Games twice, the inaugural 1896 Summer Olympics and the 2004 Summer Olympics; the country also hosted the 1906 Intercalated Games, at the time regarded as Olympic Games but not officially recognized by the International Olympic Committee today. The nation has competed at every Summer Olympic Games, one of the only four countries to have done so, and most of the Winter Olympic Games. During the parade of nations Greece is always called first, as the founding nation of the ancient precursor of modern Olympics, and its national governing body is the Hellenic Olympic Committee.

Having won a total of 121 medals (35 gold, 45 silver and 41 bronze), Greece is ranked 32nd by gold medals in the all-time Summer Olympic medal count. Their best ever performance was in the 1896 Summer Olympics, when Greece finished second in the medal table with 10 gold medals, one less than the United States, the most silver (17) and bronze (19) medals, as well as the most medals overall (46). After a long period of poor tallies, the 1992 Summer Olympics marked an upturn and Greece made successive medal-winning records (excluding the 1896 record) in the three following Olympic Games. Greek athletes have won medals in 15 different sports, but the sports in which the Greek team has won most medals are primarily athletics and weightlifting, as well as other sports like wrestling, gymnastics and shooting. In the 1906 Games, Greece finished third with 8 gold, 14 silver and 13 bronze medals, and second in total behind France with 35 medals; these medals are not officially included in the Olympic medal count though. Winter sports have not played a major role in Greece, thus the country has not won any medal in the Winter Olympics so far. Despite that, Greece leads the Parade of Nations also in the Winter Olympics.

=== Paralympic Games ===
Paralympic Sports have grown significantly in Greece since the late 1970s. The first participation of athletes with a disability at Paralympic Games was in 1976. The organisation of the Paralympic Games in Athens led to significant growth. The Hellenic Team participated in 17 of the 19 sports and won 20 medals (3 Gold, 13 Silver and 4 Bronze). At the Beijing 2008 Paralympic Games the Greek Team made its most successful appearance ever with 24 medals (5 Gold, 9 Silver and 10 Bronze). Greece has won in total 105 medals at the Paralympic Games, participating only lately.

== Football ==
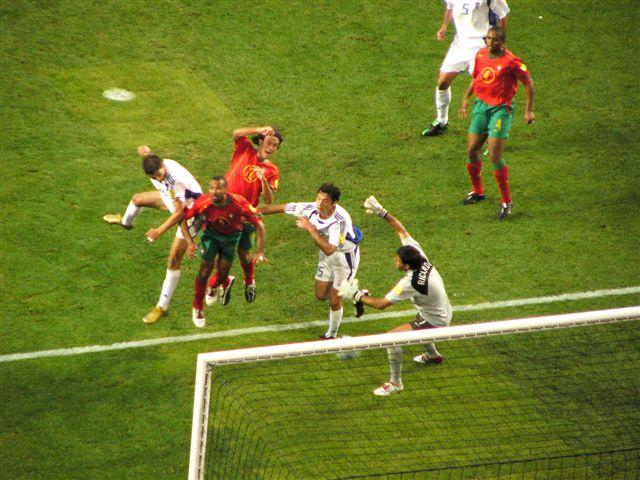
Angelos Charisteas scoring Greece's winning goal in the UEFA Euro 2004 Final.

Association football is the most popular team sport in Greece. Its national governing body is the Hellenic Football Federation founded in 1926, which is member of FIFA and UEFA. The Greece national football team rose to prominence in the UEFA Euro 2004, when they were crowned European champions which is referred to by many people as the biggest shock in football history until today. Ranked 13th in the world as of 2009, they have qualified three times for the FIFA World Cup in 1994, 2010 and 2014, reaching the Round of 16 in 2014, four times for the UEFA European Championship in 1980, 2004, 2008 and 2012, and one time for the FIFA Confederations Cup in 2005. Greece has great tradition in youth teams, which have been successful; the Under-21 team were runners-up in the UEFA European Under-21 Championship in 1988 and 1998, the Under-19 team were runners-up in the UEFA European Under-19 Championship in 2007, while the Under-17 team were runners-up in the UEFA European Under-17 Championship in 1985, took the third place in 1991 and the fourth place in 1996 and 2000.

The official national championship was held for a first time in the season 1927–28. Super League Greece is now the highest professional league in the Greek football league system. It is currently ranked 12th in the UEFA coefficient, while it was placed among the top ten strongest leagues in Europe from 1996 to 2006, with its peak being the 6th place in 2002 and 2003. The Greek Football Cup has been the main domestic cup competition, inaugurated in season 1931–32. Both competitions have been dominated by Olympiacos, which is the most successful football club in Greece, followed by Panathinaikos, AEK Athens, and PAOK. Olympiacos is the only Greek team that has won European football titles, UEFA Conference League 2024 and UEFA Youth League 2024.

== Basketball ==
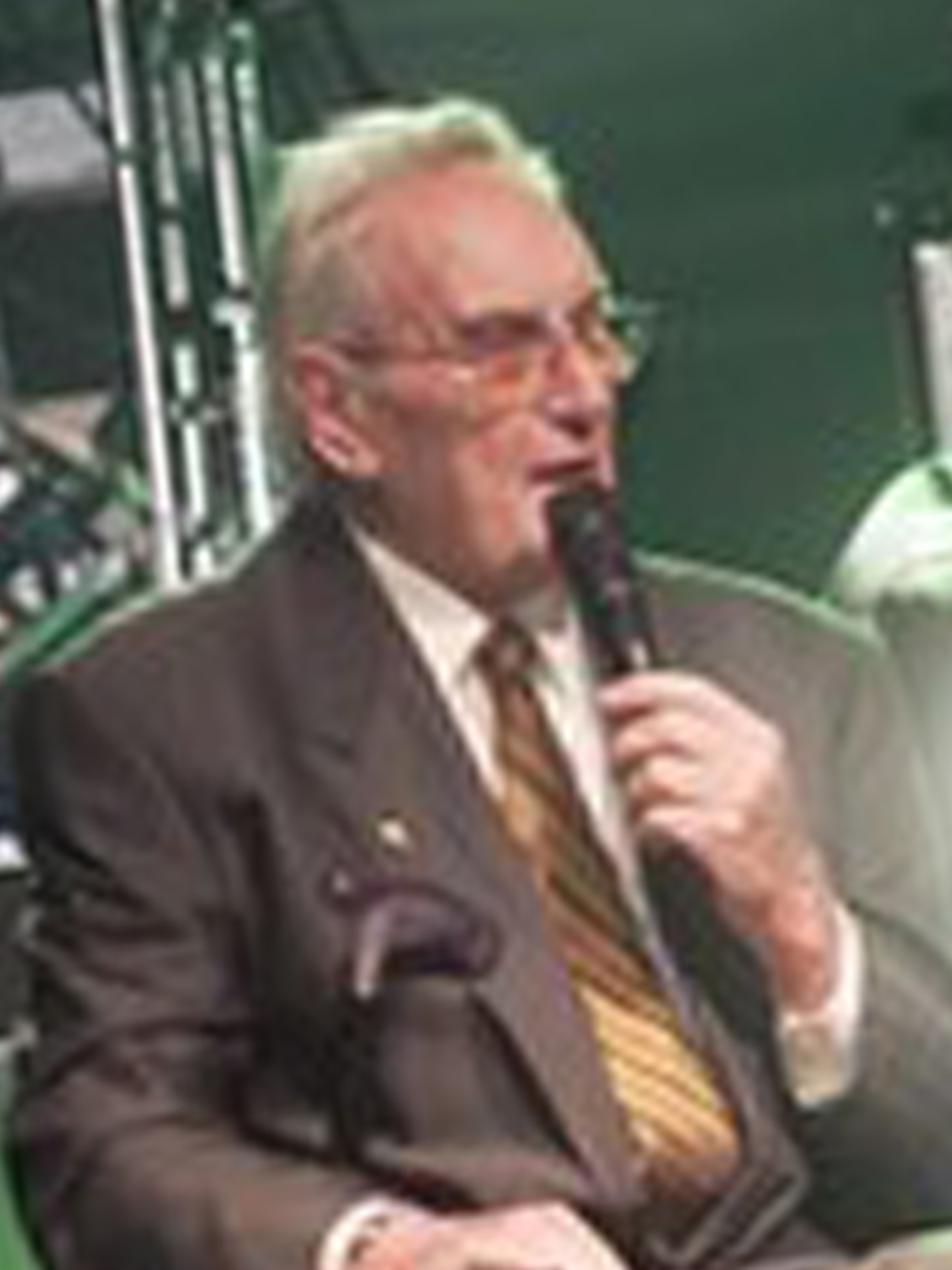
Faidon Matthaiou, considered to be the Patriarch of the basketball in Greece

Greece has a long tradition and history of success in basketball. Greece was one of the eight founding members of FIBA in 1932 and the national governing body is the Hellenic Basketball Federation, member of FIBA Europe. The Greece national basketball team is considered among the world's top basketball powers; ranked 9th in the world. They were the silver medalists of the 2006 FIBA World Championship after beating 101–95 the United States of LeBron James, Dwyane Wade, Chris Bosh, Chris Paul, Dwight Howard and Carmelo Anthony in the tournament's semifinal. They have been crowned European Champions twice, in 1987 and 2005, and they have also won three more medals at European level, one silver in 1989 and two bronze medals in 1949 and 2009 Eurobasket. At the Olympic Games they have been placed 5th in three occasions. The 1987 gold medal was the first win for a Greece national team in a major tournament in any team sport, thus basketball became extremely popular in Greece after that achievement. The youth national teams of Greece have also enjoyed great success, having been crowned World and European Champions and having won a hatful of medals in all the major World and European tournaments.

The Greek Basket League is the top professional basketball league in Greece and one of the strongest in Europe, while several Greek clubs have won major European titles. In fact, Greek basketball teams are the most successful in European basketball the last 25 years, having won as many as 11 Euroleagues since the establishment of the modern era Euroleague Final Four format in 1988, while no other nation has won more than 5 Euroleague championships in this period. AEK Athens was the first-ever Greek team, not only to reach a European Cup Final, but also to win a European title. On 4 April 1968, AEK Athens defeated Slavia Prague by a score of 89-82, in Athens before 80,000 spectators. Panathinaikos, seven times European Champions and Olympiacos, four times European Champions and four times Euroleague Runners-up, are two of the most successful European clubs and among the top basketball powers in Europe.

Besides the 11 Euroleagues, Greek basketball teams (Panathinaikos, Olympiacos, Aris Thessaloniki, AEK Athens, PAOK, Maroussi) have won 3 Triple Crowns, 5 Saporta Cups, 2 Korać Cups and 1 FIBA Europe Champions Cup, while all of them - except for Maroussi - have made it to the Euroleague Final Four. In women's basketball, Athinaikos have won the EuroCup. A number of Greek and Greek-born foreign players have gained notability for their achievements such as Nikos Galis, widely regarded as one of the all-time greatest players in international basketball history, Panagiotis Giannakis, Panagiotis Fasoulas, Fanis Christodoulou, Theodoros Papaloukas, Vassilis Spanoulis and Dimitris Diamantidis. The Greek players that have played in the NBA are Efthimios Rentzias, Vassilis Spanoulis, Antonis Fotsis, Andreas Glyniadakis, Jake Tsakalidis, Kostas Papanikolaou, brothers Giannis Antetokounmpo, Thanasis Antetokounmpo and Kostas Antetokounmpo, and Greek Americans Lou Tsioropoulos, Kurt Rambis, Nick Calathes and Kostas Koufos. Anastasia Kostaki and Evanthia Maltsi are female Greek professional basketball players that have played in the WNBA.

== Water polo ==
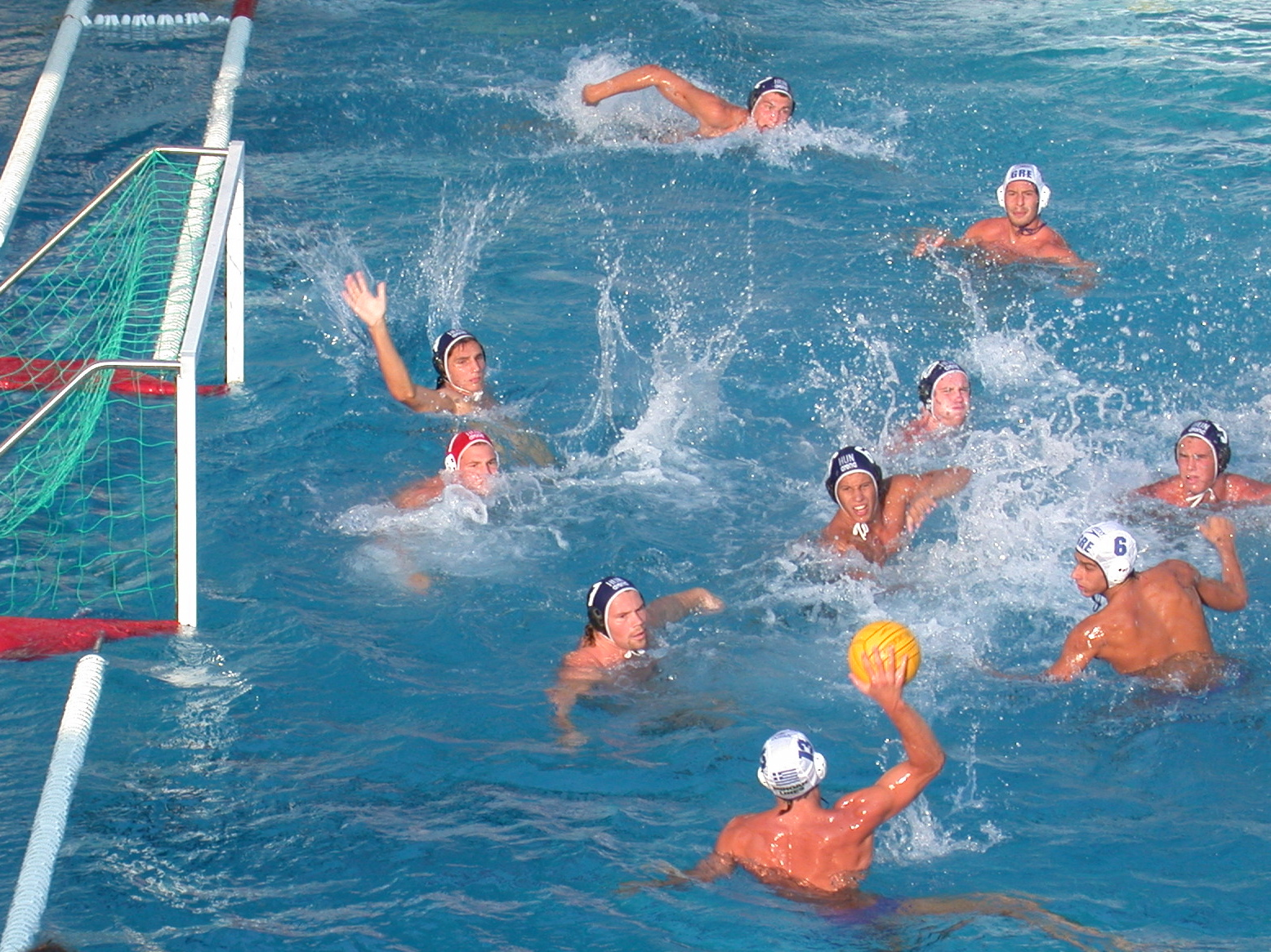
Greece (white) vs. Hungary (blue) play in a water polo match

Greece is often regarded as an international powerhouse in both men's and women's water polo, with its clubs and nationals teams having achieved a great number of distinctions in international competitions. The Greek men's national water polo team have won a silver medal in the 1997 FINA World Cup, two bronze medals in the FINA World League in 2004 and 2006, a bronze medal in the 2005 World Aquatics Championships and the 4th place in the 2004 Olympic Games. The Greek women's national water polo team's most important achievements are the gold medal in the 2011 World Aquatics Championships, the silver medals in the 2004 Olympic Games, 2010 European Championship and 2012 European Championship, as well as a gold and three bronze medals in the FINA World League in 2005, 2007, 2010 and 2012 respectively.

The Greek water polo leagues in both men and women are among the top European leagues, while several Greek clubs have enjoyed international success. In men's competitions, Olympiacos is one of the biggest European water polo clubs having won one LEN Euroleague title and a European Super Cup in 2002, the only Greek club to have been crowned European champions, while they have also participated in three more finals, one in the LEN Euroleague and two in the LEN Cup Winners' Cup; along with Ethnikos Piraeus, they are the most successful water polo clubs in the country. Vouliagmeni won a LEN Cup Winner's Cup in 1997 and they have also been runners-up one time in the LEN Trophy, such as NO Patras and Panionios. In women's competitions, the Greek clubs have dominated the European competitions in the 2000s (decade); Vouliagmeni, three-time European champions and LEN Trophy winner once, and Glyfada, with two European championships, are two of the most successful European women's sides. Ethnikos Piraeus have also won a LEN Trophy, while Olympiacos have made it to the final in the same competition y

Dimitrios Diathessopoulos is known as the father of Greek water polo.

== Athletics ==
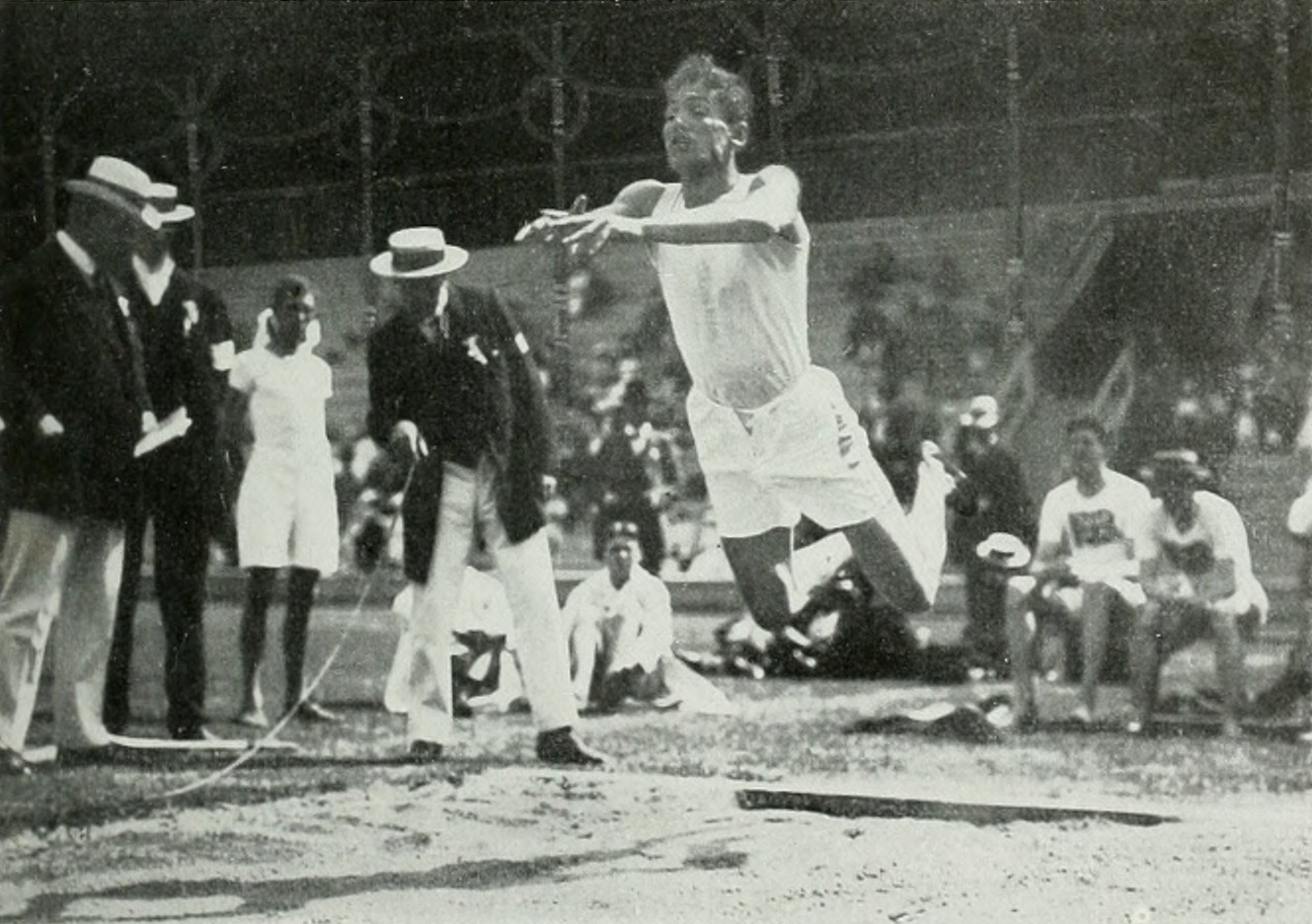
Konstantinos Tsiklitiras during the standing long jump competition at the 1912 Summer Olympics.

Athletics has been another very successful individual sport in Greece. Greek athletes have won 29 medals in total, at the Olympic games for Greece and 19 medals in the IAAF World Championships in Athletics, while some Greek athletes have reached world stardom with their achievements such as:

- Fani Chalkia who won the gold medal in the women's 400m hurdles at the 2004 Summer Olympics in Athens. During the semifinals Halkia set an Olympic record of 52.77 seconds.
- Niki Bakoyianni won a silver medal at the 1996 Summer Olympics after a tough competition with Stefka Kostadinova. Her personal best jump of 2.03 metres is the current Greek record.
- Periklis Iakovakis who won the gold medal at the World Junior Championships in Annecy, France with 49.82 seconds, and five years later he won the bronze medal at the 2003 World Championships in Athletics in Paris-Saint-Denis, France. Iakovakis achieved his personal best of 47.82 seconds on 6 May 2006 in Osaka during the IAAF World Athletics Tour. He became European Champion in Gothenborg, Sweden finishing at 48.46 seconds in the final.
- Anastasia Kelesidou is a retired Greek discus thrower best known for winning silver medals at the 2000 and 2004 Summer Olympics. During her career she set seven Greek records in discus throw, the best being 67.70 metres.
- Konstantinos Kenteris won gold medals in the 200 metres at the 2000 Summer Olympics, the 2001 World Championships in Athletics and the 2002 European Championships in Athletics. Kenteris became the first White male to win a 200-meter sprinting medal at the Olympics since Pietro Mennea achieved the feat by winning gold at the 1980 Summer Olympics in Moscow. He is one of the very few elite runners who have run the 200m distance under 20 seconds, with a personal best 19.85 sec.
- Haralabos Papadias won the gold medal in 60 metres at the 1997 World Indoor Championships, in a time of 6.50 seconds (NR), the first and only white man to do so until today.
- Voula Patoulidou was the surprise winner of the Women's 100 m hurdles race at the Olympic Games in Barcelona in 1992.
- Ekaterini Thanou won the silver medal in the women's 100 metres at the 2000 Summer Olympics in Sydney. Although Marion Jones admitted to steroid use prior to and during the Sydney Olympics and had her gold medal withdrawn by the International Olympic Committee, Thanou's silver medal was not upgraded to gold because she committed a doping offense herself in 2004. In 2002 she won the 100 m gold medal at the European Championships in Munich.
- Louis Tsatoumas is a Greek long jumper who on 2 June 2007 in Kalamata jumped 8.66 metres, achieving a personal best. The performance was the best in the world since Iván Pedroso leaped 8.70 m to win the gold medal at the 1995 World Championships. Tsatoumas ranks as the eighth best long jumper in history and holds the European record in the event at low altitude.
- Anna Verouli is a retired Greek javelin thrower who won the gold medal at the 1982 European Championships in Athletics, and a bronze medal at the 1983 World Championships in Athletics.
- Hrysopiyi Devetzi won the triple jump silver medal at the 2004 Summer Olympics with 15.25 and the triple jump bronze medal at the 2008 Summer Olympics with 15.23 m. At the 2004 Summer Olympics semifinal she set a Greek record of 15.32 metres. This performance ranks her in the fourth place of all time triple jumpers, after the world record holder, Inessa Kravets, her greatest rival Tatyana Lebedeva and Françoise Mbango Etone.
- Konstadinos Gatsioudis is a Greek javelin thrower, set a world junior record in 1990, and eight national records during his career. His personal best throw is 91.69 metres, achieved in June 2000 .

Other notable Greek athletes include Sofia Sakorafa who broke the world record on 16 September 1982 with a throw of 74.20 metres. Lambros Papakostas a retired Greek high jumper who won two silver medals at the World Indoor Championships in 1995 and 1997, with a personal best, achieved in Athens in 1992, 2.36 metres. Konstadinos Filippidis, Konstadinos Koukodimos, Christos Papanikolaou (who jumped 5.49 metres in Athens to capture the world record in 1970), Paraskevi Tsiamita, Niki Xanthou and Mirela Manjani. Also legends of the past include the legendary Spyridon Louis and Konstantinos Tsiklitiras.

== Fencing ==
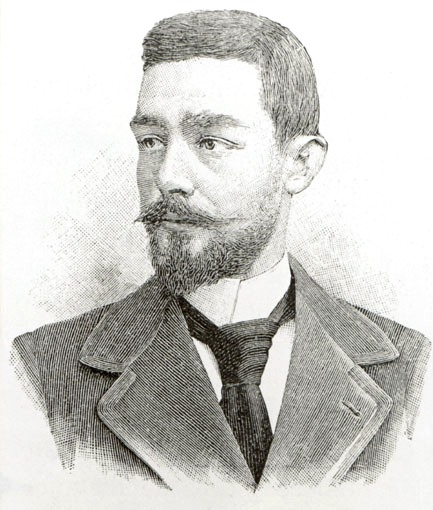
Leonidas Pyrgos

Fencing used to be popular in Greece in the late 19th century and early 20th century. Greek fencers won Olympic medals in the first Olympic Games in Athens. These include Leonidas Pyrgos, Ioannis Georgiadis gold, Tilemachos Karakalos silver and Periklis Pierrakos-Mavromichalis bronze.

== Futsal ==
Futsal in Greece was active less than three decades. The first fields of this sport appeared in the early of 1990s and initially they served the amusement and the recreation of adults. Soon, the sport becomes more organised and the first official championship held at the late of 1990s, concretely in the season 1997–98. The official Championship, Cup and the national teams are regulated by Hellenic Football Federation. Just after, in 1999 the Panhellenic Association of Futsal Clubs (Πανελλήνια Ενωση Ποδοσφαιρικών Σωματείων Σάλας) was established. Now, the championship held with the participation of ten teams.

== Handball ==
Handball is considered among the five major olympic team sports in Greece, but it is less popular than football, basketball, volleyball and water polo. However, it is a growing team sport in Greece. The Greece men's national handball team finished 6th out of 24 teams in the 2005 World Men's Handball Championship, in their first (and so far only) time competing. In the 2004 Summer Olympics, Greece finished 6th. Greece finished 4th out of 6 teams in Group B, with wins over Brazil men's national handball team and Egypt men's national handball team, before losing in the quarterfinals to eventual gold medalists Croatia men's national handball team, and then beating South Korea men's national handball team, before losing to France men's national handball team. In 2024 Greece men's national handball team was qualified for the first time for the European Men's Handball Championship.

== Kickboxing ==
Kickboxing in Greece and the Greek dispora, has produced many all-time great fighters. It is not one of the most popular sports in Greece, but it has its followers. Famous Greek fighters include:

- 'Iron' Mike Zambidis who is a former 18-time world kickboxing champion.

Kickboxing however is more popular amongst Greeks of Diaspora, especially in Melbourne, Australia, which has produced several superstars of the sport, such as:

- Stan 'The Man' Longinidis who is a former 8-time world champion.
- Tosca Petridis who is a former 7-time world champion.
- Arthur Tsakonas who is a former world champion.
- As well as other greats such as Louie Iosifidis, Nick Talakouris, Evangelos Goussis, and others.

== Motorsport ==
Greece organises the rally Acropolis one of toughest rallies in WRC's calendar. Due to the mountainous terrain of the country the roads are unpredictable, and thus an ideal place for hill-climb rally; This has led to the foundation of the Hellenic Hill Climb.

Despite the passion of the Greek people for the Formula 1 & Moto GP, there is no race track that meets the requirements for the organization of such an event. It is rumored that construction of a race track somewhere in Greece will commence that meets the standards, however this is yet to be seen. However the Serres circuit does meet the formula 3 standards. Despite this, the Greek people sate their passion for motorsports by organising a wide variety of motorsports, from drag racing to drift.

Notable Greek drivers are:

- Aris Vovos
- Alex Fontana
- Jourdan Serderidis
- Andreas Laskaratos

== Rugby ==
Rugby union and Rugby league started to gain a popular foothold in Greece during the 1990s.

A Hellenic Rugby (Union) Federation established in 2004 set up the mechanism for organizing its national team for international competitions.

The Domestic Rugby League started in 2011 in the Piraeus region and since 2012 there have been regular tournaments in Athens, Piraeus and Thessaloniki.

From September 2014 to May 2023 Rugby Union was under the aegis of the Hellenic Handball Federation. In May 2023, the Greek General Secretariat of Sports restored recognition of the Greek Rugby Federation. In February 2024 rugby sevens championships for men and women begun again.

From 2016 to 2022 Rugby League was under the aegis of the Hellenic Federation of Modern Pentathlon. In August 2022 a "Greek Rugby League Federation" was officially recognised.

On 9 November 2019 the unofficial Greece national rugby league team qualified for the 2021 Rugby League World Cup, after defeating Serbia in a qualifier in Belgrade, 82-6.

== Shooting ==
Shooting used to be very popular amongst the Greeks in the late 19th and early 20th centuries. Several Greek shooters won many Olympic medals in the first Olympiads (Pantelis Karasevdas, Georgios Orphanidis, Ioannis Frangoudis gold, Panagiotis Pavlidis, Georgios Moraitinis, Iason Sappas, Alexandros Theofilakis, Ioannis Theofilakis, Alexandros Vrasivanopoulos silver, Nicolaos Trikupis, Nikolaos Morakis, Anastasios Metaxas bronze).

A new rise in shooting's popularity has been noted after Anna Korakaki won 1 gold and 1 bronze medal at the 2016 Summer Olympics.

== Sailing & Rowing ==
Greece has three bordering seas, the Aegean Sea, Ionian Sea and Mediterranean Sea, so it is not surprising that sailing is a popular sport. Greek athletes have won 7 medals in sailing and 2 in Rowing at the Olympic games and also numerous gold medals in the world and European championships. Some of the most notable Greek athletes in the sports of sailing and rowing include world and olympic champions such as:

- Nikolaos Kaklamanakis, a Greek Gold-medal winner in windsurfing, who lit the Olympic torch in the opening ceremony of the 2004 Summer Olympics in Athens.
- Anastasios Bountouris, a Greek sailor who competed at six Olympics between 1976 and 1996. He is the first Greek to compete at six Olympic Games, an achievement so far matched only by shooter Agathi Kassoumi. He won a bronze medal in the 1980 Olympics in the Three-Person Keelboat with Anastasios Gavrilis and Aristidis Rapanakis.
- Sofia Bekatorou, who has participated in over 470 main class events including 2004 Summer Olympics sailing competition, where she won gold medal in the women's double-handed dinghy event in the 470 with her pair Emilia Tsoulfa. She has also won 4 world championships.
- Georgios Zaimis, a Greek sailor and Olympic Champion, who together with Constantine II of Greece and Odysseus Eskidioglou competed at the 1960 Summer Olympics in Rome and won a gold medal in the Dragon class with the boat Nirefs .
- Vasileios Polymeros, a Greek rower who won the bronze medal in men's lightweight double sculls with Nikolaos Skiathitis at the 2004 Summer Olympics in Athens, and the silver in men's lightweight double sculls with Dimitrios Mougios at the 2008 Summer Olympics in Beijing. He has also won one gold and 3 silver medals in the world championships.
- Dimitrios Mougios is a Greek rower, who won the silver medal in men's lightweight double sculls with Vasileios Polymeros at the 2008 Summer Olympics in Beijing, two-times European champion and a silver world champion.

== Swimming & Diving ==
Swimming and Diving are two sports that Greek athletes have achieved significant wins at the Olympic Games, World championships and European Championships. Some notable Greek swimmers are the Olympic champions of the past Spyridon Chazapis and Efstathios Chorafas and present World and European champions such as Romanos Alyfantis, Nery Mantey Niangkouara, Ioannis Drymonakos, the world champion in the 50 m backstroke event of the 2005 World Championships Aristeidis Grigoriadis and silver world champion Spyridon Gianniotis. Thomas Bimis and Nikolaos Siranidis made history winning Greece's first-ever gold medal in diving and the hosts' first gold of the 2004 Athens Olympics. The diver pair therefore became very popular in Greece.

== Tennis ==
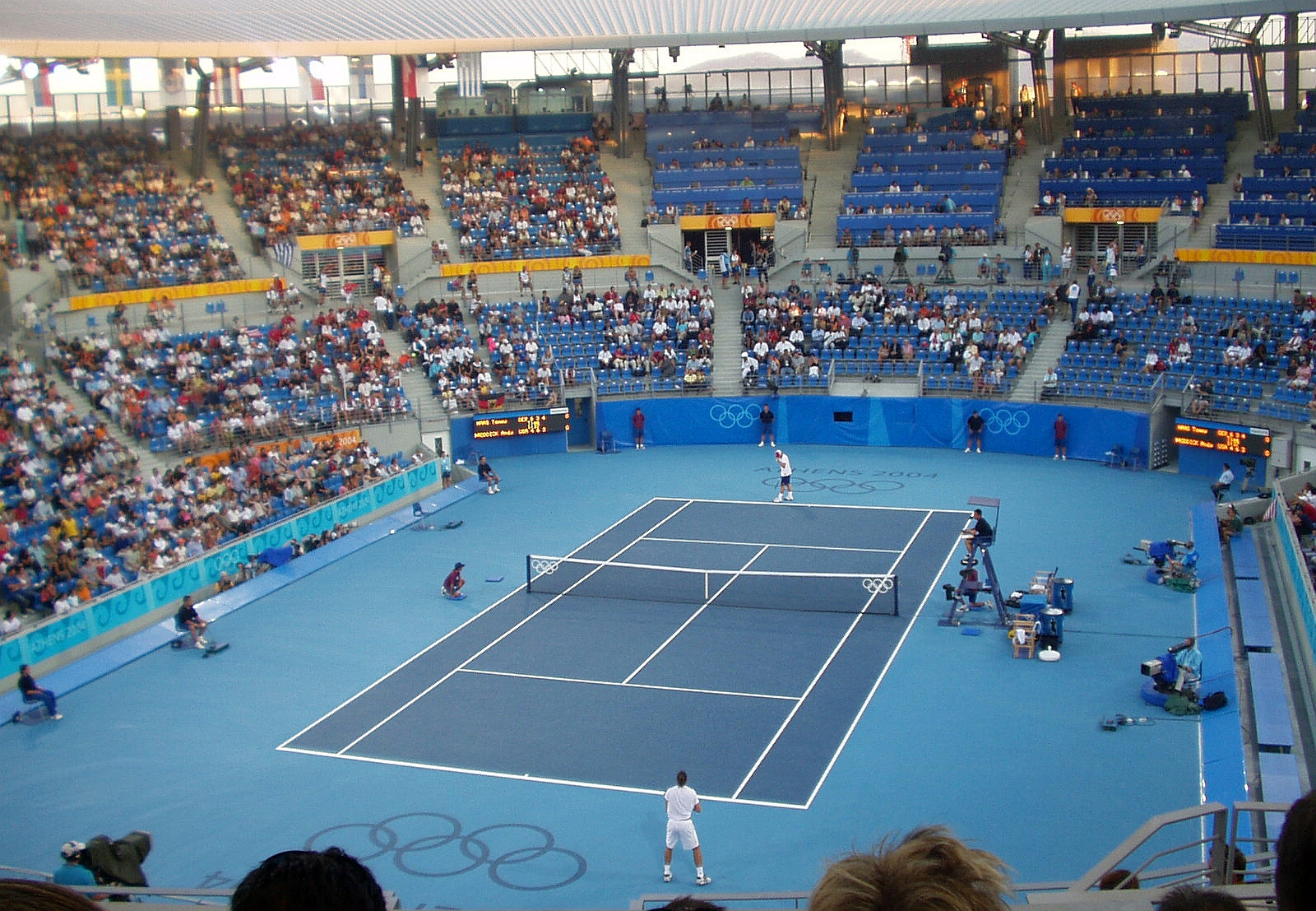
Athens Olympic Tennis Centre during the 2004 Summer Olympics.

Tennis has been growing in Greece over the past decade. Eleni Daniilidou has had a lot of success, winning 5 WTA Tour titles in her career. Several players with Greek ancestry, such as Pete Sampras and Mark Philippoussis have become very famous around the world. Greek-Cypriot star Marcos Baghdatis has many fans in Greece. Greece also has several other players at the international level, like Konstantinos Economidis, Anna Gerasimou and Irini Georgatou.

Since the late 2010's, a new era started for this sport in Greece with the rise of Maria Sakkari and Stefanos Tsitsipas. Sakkari broke into the world top 10 in the WTA Rankings in 2021 and reached the semis of two Grand Slams at the French Open and the US Open. She finished both 2021 and 2022 ranked in the top 10 and has been as high as world number 3. In the men's game, Tsitsipas has made a strong impression by reaching the 2021 French Open final, becoming the first player representing Greece to have reached a major final. Tsitsipas has also notably won the Monte-Carlo Masters twice and won the ATP Finals in 2019. Like Sakkari, Tsitsipas has also been as high as world number 3.

== Volleyball ==
Volleyball is a popular sport in Greece controlled by the Hellenic Volleyball Federation, member of CEV. The major achievements of the Greek men's national volleyball team are two bronze medals, one in the Men's European Volleyball Championship and another one in the Men's European Volleyball League, a 5th place in the Olympic Games and a 6th place in the FIVB Volleyball Men's World Championship. The Greek league, the A1 Ethniki, is considered one of the top volleyball leagues in Europe and the Greek clubs have made significant success in European competitions. Olympiacos is the most successful volleyball club in the country having won the most domestic titles and being the only Greek club to have won European trophies; they have won two CEV Cups, they have been CEV Champions League runners-up twice and have also played in many final fours in the European competitions, making them one of the biggest volleyball clubs in Europe. Iraklis, Panathinaikos and Orestiada have also made it to the final in continental tournaments.

Greece featured a women's national team in beach volleyball that competed at the 2018–2020 CEV Beach Volleyball Continental Cup.

== Weightlifting ==
Weightlifting has been the most successful individual sport for the Greeks, with the national team regularly winning gold medals at the Olympics and the rest international competitions. Greek weightlifters have won a total 15 medals at the Olympics with 6 of them being gold, 5 silver and 4 bronze medals. In the World Weightlifting Championships Greek weightlifting team has won a total 111 medals (70 in men and 41 in women) with 26 of them being gold. Greek weightlifters have set many world and Olympic records during the years which forced the sporting world to name the Greek weightlifting team of the mid-1990s, the "Dream Team" of the sport. Some of the greatest weightlifters in the history of the sport include Greek legends such as:

- Pyrros Dimas, a Greek weightlifter from Northern Epirus. A three-time Olympic champion, multiple World and European champion. He is considered worldwide one of the greatest athletes in the history of this sport and the most successful weightlifter of the Olympic Games.
- Kakhi Kakhiashvili, another all-time great of this sport. He is one of only four weightlifters to have won three consecutive gold medals at Olympic Games.
- Viktor Mitrou, a retired male weightlifter from Greece. He became an Olympic medalist during the 2000 Summer Olympics when he claimed the silver medal in the men's – 77 kg class and
- The legendary Greek weightlifter Dimitrios Tofalos. He was a member of both Gymnastiki Etaireia Patron and Panachaikos Gymnastikos syllogos, that merged in 1923 to become Panachaiki Gymnastiki Enosi. Arguably the greatest weightlifter of the early 20th century, he won the gold medal in the 1906 Intercalated Games, setting a world record that lasted until 1914.

== Wrestling ==
The forms of wrestling we know today as Greco-Roman and Freestyle found their origins in the lands on the eastern end of the Mediterranean Sea. These lands are where the Ancient Greeks resided, and developed the art of wrestling. Wrestling to the Greeks was not only part of a soldier's training regimen, but also a part of everyday life. Even in modern days, Wrestling has been one of the most significant Olympic sports in Greece, which has produced many Olympic and world champions and has given moments of glory to the country. Greece has won 11 medals at the modern Olympics and multiple medals in the World and European championships, a fact that makes the sport as one of the most successful for the country on a global stage. Some of the most significant Greek wrestlers are:

Greco-Roman Wrestling:

- Stelios Mygiakis, who competed at the 1980 Summer Olympics in Moscow and won a gold medal in Greco-Roman wrestling.
- Georgios Tsitas, who won a silver medal at the 1896 Summer Olympics in Greco-Roman wrestling.
- Petros Galaktopoulos, who won 3 medals at the FILA Wrestling World Championships and 2 Olympic medals, a bronze at the 1968 Summer Olympics and a silver at the 1972 Summer Olympics, in Greco-Roman wrestling.
- Artiom Kiouregkian, is a Greek-Armenian wrestler, who won a bronze medal at the 2004 Summer Olympic Games in Greco-Roman wrestling.

Freestyle Wrestling:

- Ioannis Arzoumanidis, a two time bronze medalist at the world championships, in Freestyle Wrestling.

== Popularity of sports ==
In 2021 a research was made about trends concerning motorsports in Greece. The research had been requested by the Organisational Committee for Events of Motor Sports (Motorsport Greece), and was conducted by Kappa Research. One of the questions was "which sport or sports would you say that you watch the most?". According to the findings of the research the most popular sports to watch in Greece are in descending order: football, basketball, athletics, motorsports, tennis, volleyball, waterpolo, martial arts.

== Notable multi-sport clubs ==
- In Athens: Panathinaikos A.O., A.E.K., Panionios G.S.S., NC Vouliagmeni, Panellinios G.S.
- In Thessaloniki: P.A.O.K., Aris Thessaloniki, G.S. Iraklis Thessaloniki
- In Patras: Panachaiki G.E.
- In Piraeus: Olympiacos CFP, Ethnikos Piraeus
- In Larissa: Athletic Union of Larissa 1964
- In Heraklion: O.F.I.
- In Ioannina: PAS Giannina

== Notable sportsmen of Greek origin ==
Greek American

- Pete Sampras - tennis player, considered one of the best tennis players in history
- Chris Chelios - NHL hockey all-time great player
- Peter Angelos - MLB owner of the Baltimore Orioles
- Anton Christoforidis - professional boxer, NBA World Light Heavyweight Champion 1941
- Chris Karamesines - racecar driver
- David Batista (Bautista) - WWE SmackDown!, professional wrestler (Greek mother)
- Kosta Koufos - player for the Utah Jazz in the NBA and the Greece national team
- George Karlaftis - American football defensive end for the Kansas City Chiefs of the National Football League (NFL) - 2× Super Bowl champion
- Dean Karnazes - ultramarathon champion, writer, businessman
- Alex Karras - NFL player with the Detroit Lions, wrestler and actor
- Lou Karras - NFL player with the Washington Redskins, older brother of Alex Karras
- Ted Karras - NFL player with the Chicago Bears and Detroit Lions, brothers of Alex & Lou Karras
- Alexi Lalas - soccer player for the L.A. Galaxy, U.S. national team
- George Kottaras - currently starting catcher for the Milwaukee Brewers
- Matt Stover - NFL player, kicker for Baltimore Ravens
- Jim Londos - champion wrestler during the 1930s
- Greg Louganis - Olympic diving champion
- Harry "the Golden Greek" Agganis^{1} - college football star and professional baseball player for the Boston Red Sox
- Chris Maragos - former American football safety and special teamer, 2 times Super Bowl champion.
- Nick Markakis - MLB outfielder who currently plays for the Atlanta Braves
- Tino Martinez - former MLB first baseman for the N.Y. Yankees (Greek mother)
- Milt Pappas - MLB pitcher for the Baltimore Orioles and Cincinnati Reds and other teams
- Tom Pappas - Track & field decathlete, 2003 world decathlon champion and 2-time Olympian.
- George Parros - NHL hockey player
- Kurt Rambis - former NBA player, won 4 championships with the L.A. Lakers (birth name Kyriakos Rambidis)
- Alex Spanos - NFL owner of the San Diego Chargers
- Trish Stratus - WWE diva
- George Theodore - MLB outfielder for the New York Mets
- Lou Tsioropoulos - former NBA player with the Boston Celtics
- Garo Yepremian - NFL player (Greek Cypriot origin)

Greek Australian

- Braith Anasta – Rugby league
- Anthony Koutoufides- a former Australian rules footballer with the Carlton Football Club. One of the most powerful and athletic players of all-time, he played in almost every position and was often called the prototype of the modern footballer.
- Ang Christou – Australian rules football player
- Angelo Lekkas – Australian rules football player
- Lou Richards – Australian rules football player
- David Zaharakis – Australian rules football player
- Michael Katsidis – professional boxer, former WBO lightweight world champion
- George Kambosos Jr. - professional boxer
- Stan Longinidis - a retired Australian Heavyweight kickboxer and 8-time Kickboxing World Champion. Born in Australia of Greek ethnicity, Longinidis is one of the few fighters to have won World titles in three different styles, International Rules Kickboxing, Full Contact and Muay Thai.
- Tosca Petridis - a former 7 world Kickboxing champion
- George Sotiropoulos – mixed martial artist
- Glenn Lazarus – player Canberra Raiders, Brisbane Broncos and Melbourne Storm
- George Peponis – former Australian captain
- Willie Peters – player, South Sydney Rabbitohs
- Michael Diamond – shooter – Olympic gold medallist, Sydney 2000
- Lydia Lassila (née Lerodiaconou) – skier – Winter Olympian (gold medalist)
- Mark Philippoussis – tennis player
- Nick Kyrgios - tennis player
- Thanasi Kokkinakis - tennis player
- Stan Lazaridis – Association football player
- Charlie Yankos – Association football player
- Marcus Stoinis - Australian cricket player

Greek Diaspora

- Joseph Pilates
- Nicolas Macrozonaris
- Dave Nonis
- Dominic Filiou
- George Athans
- Bret Hart
- Stanley Christodoulou
- Nic Pothas
- Eder Jofre
- Emanuel Moriatis
- Oscar Panno
- Kyriakos Ioannou
- Ilias Zacharopoulos

== See also ==
- Super League Greece (top football league)
- Greek Basket League (top basketball league)
- Hellenic Football Federation
- Greece national football team
- Greece national basketball team
- Greece at the 2004 Summer Olympics
- List of Greek sports teams
