= Antonio Vázquez =

Antonio Vázquez may refer to:

- Antonio Vázquez de Espinosa (died 1630), Spanish monk
- Antonio Vázquez (sport shooter) (1860 – after 1920), Spanish sport shooter and Olympic competitor
- Antonio Vázquez (archer) (born 1961), Spanish archer and Olympic gold medalist
- Antonio Jesús Vázquez Muñoz or Jesús Vázquez (born 1980), Spanish football player
- Antonio Vázquez (weightlifter) (born 1993), weightlifter who represented Mexico at the 2015 Pan American Games
