= Robert Andrieux =

Belgian sports shooter

Sport
- Sport: Sports shooting

Robert Andrieux was a Belgian sports shooter. He competed in the 30m team military pistol event at the 1920 Summer Olympics.
