= Howard Bayles =

American sports shooter

Personal information
- Born: April 6, 1877 Port Jefferson, New York, United States
- Died: May 20, 1940 (aged 63) Port Chester, New York, United States

Sport
- Sport: Sports shooting

Howard Alfred Bayles (April 6, 1877 – May 20, 1940) was an American sports shooter. He competed in two events at the 1920 Summer Olympics.
