= Jules Bastin (sport shooter) =

Belgian sport shooter

Personal information
- Born: 28 December 1879

Sport
- Sport: Sports shooting

Jules Bastin (born 28 December 1879, date of death unknown) was a Belgian sports shooter. He competed in the 30m team military pistol event at the 1920 Summer Olympics.
