= George Fiske (sport shooter) =

American sports shooter

Personal information
- Born: September 28, 1891 Chicago, Illinois, United States
- Died: June 21, 1965 (aged 73)

Sport
- Sport: Sports shooting

George Foster Fiske (September 28, 1891 – June 21, 1965) was an American sports shooter. He competed in the 50m free pistol event at the 1920 Summer Olympics.
