= Léon De Coster =

Belgian sports shooter

Personal information
- Born: 26 April 1893 Mechelen, Belgium

Sport
- Sport: Sports shooting

Léon De Coster (born 26 April 1893, date of death unknown) was a Belgian sports shooter. He competed in the 30m team military pistol event at the 1920 Summer Olympics.
