= Dario Barbosa =

Brazilian sport shooter (1882-1965)

Personal information
- Born: 21 July 1882 Porto Alegre, Brazil
- Died: 25 September 1965 (aged 83) Porto Alegre, Brazil

Sport
- Sport: Sports shooting
Medal record
Men's shooting
Representing Brazil
Olympic Games
Bronze medal – third place	1920 Antwerp	team 50 m free pistol

Dario Barbosa (21 July 1882 – 25 September 1965) was a Brazilian sport shooter who competed in the 1920 Summer Olympics. In 1920, he won the bronze medal with the Brazilian team in the team 50 metre free pistol competition.

In the 1920 Summer Olympics, he also participated in the following events:

- Team 30 metre military pistol – fourth place
- 50 metre free pistol – place unknown
