= Guilherme Paraense =

Brazilian sport shooter

Personal information
- Born: 25 June 1884 Belém, Empire of Brazil
- Died: 18 April 1968 (aged 83) Rio de Janeiro, Brazil

Sport
- Sport: Sports shooting
Medal record
Men's shooting
Representing Brazil
Olympic Games
Gold medal – first place	1920 Antwerp	30 m military pistol
Bronze medal – third place	1920 Antwerp	team 50 m free pistol

Guilherme Paraense (25 June 1884 – 18 April 1968) was a Brazilian sport shooter and Olympic Champion. He was the first Brazilian to win an Olympic gold medal.

Paraense was born in Belém. He won a gold medal at the 1920 Summer Olympics in Antwerp, in the Rapid-Fire Pistol event. He was also part of the Brazilian team which earned a bronze medal in Military Revolver.

He also finished fourth with the Brazilian team in the team 30 metre military pistol competition. He also participated in the individual 50 metre free pistol event, but his place is unknown.

Paraense died in Rio de Janeiro, aged 83.
