= Roberto Preda =

Italian sports shooter

Personal information
- Born: 25 August 1878 Massa Lombarda, Italy
- Died: 20 July 1962 (aged 83) Faenza, Italy

Sport
- Sport: Sports shooting

Roberto Ettore Domenico Preda (25 August 1878 – 20 July 1962) was an Italian sports shooter. He competed in two events at the 1920 Summer Olympics.
