= Sebastião Wolf =

Brazilian sport shooter

Personal information
- Nationality: German; Brazilian (naturalized)
- Born: 5 February 1869 Gößweinstein, BY, Germany
- Died: 15 March 1936 (aged 67) Porto Alegre, RS, Brazil

Sport
- Sport: Sports shooting
Medal record
Men's shooting
Representing Brazil
Olympic Games
Bronze medal – third place	1920 Antwerp	team 50 m free pistol

Sebastião Wolf (5 February 1869 – 15 March 1936) was a Brazilian sport shooter who competed in the 1920 Summer Olympics. In 1920, he won the bronze medal with the Brazilian team in the team 50 metre free pistol competition.

In the 1920 Summer Olympics he also participated in the following events:

- Team 30 metre military pistol – fourth place
- 50 metre free pistol – place unknown
