= Louis Harant =

American sport shooter

Personal information
- Born: Louis Joseph Slavotinek; November 20, 1895 Baltimore, Maryland, United States
- Died: July 2, 1986 (aged 90) Vero Beach, Florida, United States

Sport
- Sport: Sports shooting
Medal record
Men's shooting
Representing United States
Olympic Games
Gold medal – first place	1920 Antwerp	Team 30 m military pistol

Louis Joseph Harant (November 20, 1895 – July 2, 1986) was an American sport shooter who competed in the 1920 Summer Olympics.

In 1920, he won the gold medal as a member of the American team in the team 30 metre military pistol competition. He also participated in the individual 30 metre military pistol event, finishing fourth.

He was born as Louis Joseph Slavotinek in Baltimore, Maryland on 20 November 1895 and baptized Catholic at St. Wenceslaus Church on 1 December. His mother, Monika (née Bezvodová), was from Mnichovo Hradiště. His father, Alois Slavotínek, was from Prostějov and died in 1899 from chronic bronchitis. In 1904, Monika remarried to František Harant at the same church; Louis subsequently adopted his surname by 1920.

He died in Vero Beach, Florida.
