= Otto Plantener =

Danish sports shooter (1889–1964)

Personal information
- Born: 26 April 1889 Odense, Denmark
- Died: 9 April 1964 (aged 74) Copenhagen, Denmark

Sport
- Sport: Sports shooting

Otto Plantener (26 April 1889 – 9 April 1964) was a Danish sports shooter. He competed in three events at the 1920 Summer Olympics.
