= Luigi Antognini =

Swiss shot putter

Personal information
- Full name: Luigi Paolo Antognini
- Nationality: Swiss
- Born: 8 September 1886
- Died: 21 July 1966 (aged 99)

Sport
- Sport: Athletics
- Event: Shot put

Luigi Antognini (8 September 1886 – 21 July 1966) was a Swiss athlete. He competed in the men's shot put at the 1920 Summer Olympics. Antognini was the flag bearer for Switzerland in the opening ceremony of the 1920 Summer Olympics.
