= Joseph Pecchia =

French sports shooter

Personal information
- Born: 13 July 1889 Montmagny, Val-d'Oise, France
- Died: 26 November 1974 (aged 85) Montmorency, Val-d'Oise, France

Sport
- Sport: Sports shooting

Joseph Pecchia (13 July 1889 – 26 November 1974) was a French sports shooter. He competed in two events at the 1920 Summer Olympics.
