= Klaas Woldendorp =

Dutch sports shooter

Personal information
- Born: 12 February 1871 Delft, Netherlands
- Died: 28 February 1936 (aged 65) Rotterdam, Netherlands

Sport
- Sport: Sports shooting

Klaas Woldendorp (12 February 1871 – 28 February 1936) was a Dutch sports shooter. He competed in two events at the 1920 Summer Olympics.
