= Carl Pedersen (sport shooter) =

Danish sports shooter (born 1888)

Personal information
- Born: 7 February 1888 Hovedstaden, Denmark
- Died: Canada

Sport
- Sport: Sports shooting

Carl Emil Pedersen (born 7 February 1888, date of death unknown) was a Danish sports shooter. He competed in three events at the 1920 Summer Olympics.
