= Ioannis Dialetis =

Greek wrestler

Ioannis Dialetis was a Greek wrestler. He competed in the Greco-Roman featherweight and the freestyle featherweight events at the 1920 Summer Olympics.
