= Émile Boitout =

French sports shooter

Personal information
- Full name: Edmond Émile Boitout
- Born: 14 May 1870 Saint-Pierre-lès-Elbeuf, France
- Died: Unknown

Sport
- Sport: Sports shooting

Edmond Émile Boitout (born 14 May 1870, date of death unknown) was a French sports shooter. He competed in two events at the 1920 Summer Olympics.
