= Gunnar Gabrielsson =

Swedish sport shooter

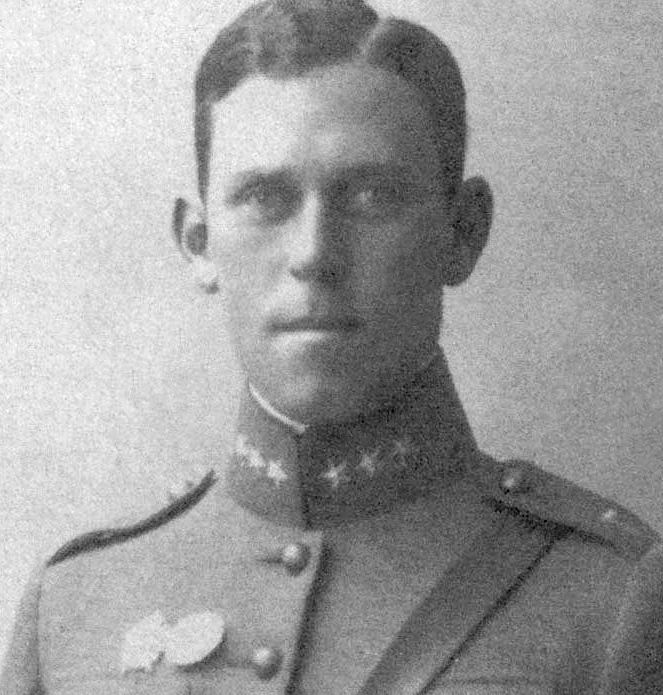

Personal information
- Born: 17 June 1891 Sölvesborg, Sweden
- Died: 29 March 1981 (aged 89) Karlskrona, Sweden

Sport
- Sport: Sports shooting
- Club: I7 IF, Karlskrona
Medal record
Representing Sweden
Olympic Games
Silver medal – second place	1920 Antwerp	Team free pistol

Gunnar Emil Gabrielsson (17 June 1891 – 29 March 1981) was a Swedish sport shooter who competed in the 1920 Summer Olympics. He won a silver medal in the team free pistol competition, and also participated in the individual free pistol event. Gabrielsson was a career military officer, reaching the rank of major.
