= Michael Kelly (sport shooter) =

American sport shooter (1872–1923)

Personal information
- Born: March 29, 1872 Attymon, County Galway, Ireland
- Died: May 3, 1923 (aged 51) Koblenz, Germany

Sport
- Sport: Sports shooting
Medal record
Men's shooting
Representing United States
Olympic Games
Gold medal – first place	1920 Antwerp	Team 30 m military pistol
Gold medal – first place	1920 Antwerp	Team 50 m free pistol

Michael Kelly (March 29, 1872 – May 3, 1923) was an American sport shooter, born in Attymon, County Galway, Ireland, who competed in the 1920 Summer Olympics. In 1920 he won the gold medal as member of the American team in the team 30 metre military pistol competition as well as in the 50 metre free pistol event.
