= Antonio Vázquez (sport shooter) =

Spanish sport shooter

Personal information
- Born: 9 October 1860 Madrid, Spain

Sport
- Sport: Sports shooting

Antonio Vázquez de Aldana Fernández (9 October 1860 – after 1920) was a Spanish sport shooter who competed in the 1920 Summer Olympics.

In the 1920 Summer Olympics he participated in the following events:

- Team 30 metre military pistol – sixth place
- Team 50 metre free pistol – twelfth place
