= Jules Maujean =

French sports shooter

Personal information
- Born: 22 February 1886 Laveline-devant-Bruyères, France
- Died: 5 December 1966 (aged 80) Nancy, France

Sport
- Sport: Sports shooting

Paul Jules Maujean (22 February 1886 – 5 December 1966) was a French sports shooter. He competed in two events at the 1920 Summer Olympics.
