= Anders Johnsson (sport shooter) =

Swedish sport shooter

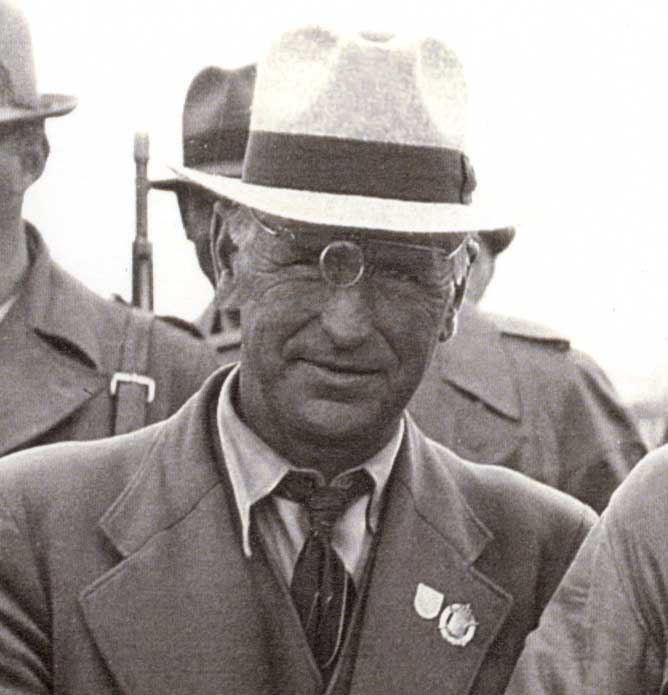

Personal information
- Born: 14 November 1890 Staffanstorp, Sweden
- Died: 7 July 1952 (aged 61) Staffanstorp, Sweden

Sport
- Sport: Sport shooting
- Event: Pistol
- Club: Malmö SG
Medal record
Representing Sweden
Olympic Games
Silver medal – second place	1920 Antwerp	Team free pistol

Anders Johnsson (14 November 1890 – 7 July 1952) was a Swedish sport shooter who competed in the 1920 Summer Olympics. He won a silver medal in the team free pistol competition, and also took part in the individual free pistol event.
