= Karl Frederick =

American sport shooter (1881–1963)

Personal information
- Born: February 2, 1881 Chateaugay, New York, United States
- Died: February 11, 1963 (aged 82) Port Chester, New York, United States

Sport
- Sport: Sports shooting
Medal record
Men's shooting
Representing United States
Olympic Games
Gold medal – first place	1920 Antwerp	50 m free pistol
Gold medal – first place	1920 Antwerp	50 m team free pistol
Gold medal – first place	1920 Antwerp	30 m team military pistol

Karl Telford Frederick (February 2, 1881 – February 11, 1963) was an American sport shooter who competed in the 1920 Summer Olympics.

In 1920 he won the gold medal in the individual free pistol event. And he won two gold medals as member of the American team in the team 50 metre free pistol competition and in the team 30 metre military pistol event. He also participated in the individual 30 metre military pistol competition but his place is unknown.

He was born in Chateaugay, New York, and graduated from Princeton University and Harvard Law School.

Frederick served as president of the National Rifle Association of America (from 1934 to 1935) and vice president of the US Revolver Association. He testified during hearings on the National Firearms Act in 1934, saying "I have never believed in the general practice of carrying weapons. I seldom carry one. I have when I felt it was desirable to do so for my own protection. I know that applies in most of the instances where guns are used effectively in self-defense or in places of business and in the home. I do not believe in the general promiscuous toting of guns. I think it should be sharply restricted and only under licenses." Following discussion on the criminal element obtaining weapons, he said "I believe in regulatory methods. I think that makes it desirable that any such regulations imposed should not impose undue hardships on the law-abiding citizens and that they should not obstruct him in the right of self-defense, but that they should be directed exclusively, so far as possible, to suppressing the criminal use, or punishing the criminal use of weapons."

== See also ==
- List of Princeton University Olympians

National Rifle Association of America
Preceded by G. A. Fraser	President of the NRA; 1934–1935	Succeeded by Ammon B. Critchfield
