= Casimir Reuterskiöld =

Swedish sport shooter

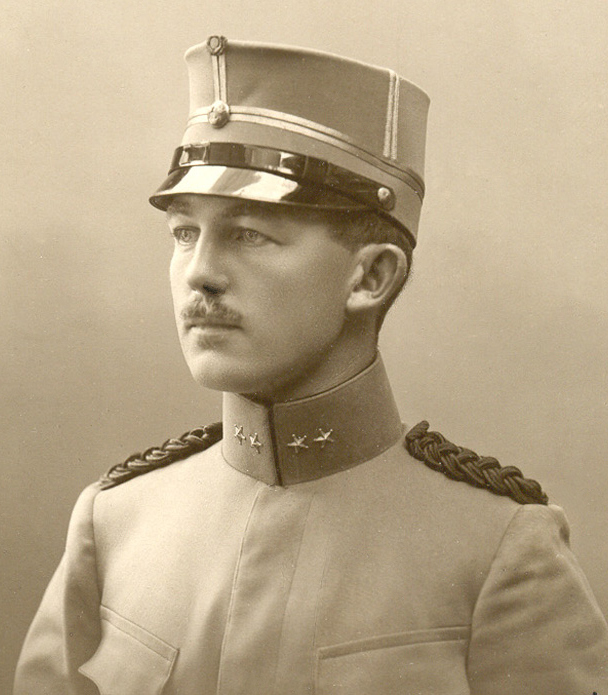

Personal information
- Born: 14 September 1883 Ljusdal, Sweden
- Died: 25 December 1953 (aged 70) Stockholm, Sweden
- Height: 173 cm (5 ft 8 in)

Sport
- Sport: Sports shooting
- Event: Pistol
- Club: FOK, Stockholm
Medal record
Representing Sweden
Olympic Games
| Silver medal – second place | 1920 Antwerp | Team free pistol |
World championships
| Bronze medal – third place | 1913 Camp Perry | Individual 50 m pistol |
| Bronze medal – third place | 1913 Camp Perry | Team 50 m pistol |

Ludvig Casimir Reuterskiöld (14 September 1883 – 25 December 1953) was a Swedish sport shooter who competed in the 1920 Summer Olympics. He won a silver medal in the team free pistol competition and finished eighth individually.

Reuterskiöld was a career military officer. At the 1920 Olympics, he held the rank of captain and was one of the most experienced shooters on the Swedish pistol team, having won two bronze medals at the 1913 World Championships. He retired from the service as a major.
