= James H. Snook =

American sport shooter, veterinarian, and murderer (1879–1930)

James Howard Snook
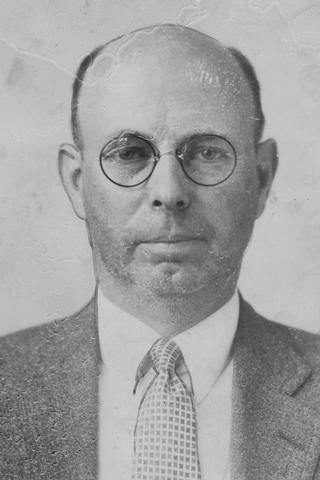
- Snook in 1929
- Born: September 17, 1879; South Lebanon, Ohio, US
- Died: February 28, 1930 (aged 50); Ohio Penitentiary, Columbus, Ohio, US
- Resting place: Green Lawn Cemetery, Columbus, Ohio, US
- Occupation: Professor
- Employer: Ohio State University
- Height: 178 cm (5 ft 10 in)
- Criminal charges: First-degree murder
- Criminal status: Executed by electrocution
- Spouse: Helen Marple (m. 1922)
- Partner: Theora Hix
Medal record
Men's shooting
Representing the United States
ISSF World Shooting Championships
Gold medal – first place	1913 Camp Perry	50 m team pistol
Olympic Games
Gold medal – first place	1920 Antwerp	Team 30 m military pistol
Gold medal – first place	1920 Antwerp	50 m team pistol

James Howard Snook (September 17, 1879 – February 28, 1930) was an American Olympic sport shooter, veterinarian, professor, and convicted murderer. He won two gold medals in team events for the United States at the 1920 Summer Olympics. Outside of sport, he worked as a professor and a veterinary surgeon at the Ohio State University College of Veterinary Medicine, where he invented a surgical instrument called the Snook hook. In 1929 he murdered Theora Hix, a student with whom he had an extramarital affair. The murder trial received widespread media attention before he was sentenced to death and executed by electric chair in 1930.

== Early life and education ==
James H. Snook was born on September 17, 1879, in South Lebanon, Ohio, to Albert L. Snook and Mary Keever Snook. He had a younger sister named Bertha. As a teenager he attended South Lebanon High School and was known for his quiet demeanor. His father owned around 220 acres of farmland, a corn-canning factory, and a horse racing track. The Snook family was well known for their racehorses, and an interest in his father's horses contributed to James gaining an interest in veterinary medicine.

Snook earned a commercial business degree at the Nelson Business College before returning to work on his family farm for three years. He began attending Ohio State University in 1905 and received his doctorate in veterinary medicine in 1908. While he was a student at the university he was a member of the Veterinary Medical Society as well as the fraternities Sigma Phi Epsilon and Alpha Psi, the latter of which he co-founded. He entered Cornell University in New York in 1908 but soon thereafter returned to his family farm. Snook served in Cavalry Troop B of the Ohio National Guard and fought against the Night Riders along the southern border of Ohio in 1908.

== Career ==
=== Ohio State University ===
On January 1, 1910, Snook started working as a teaching assistant at the Ohio State University College of Veterinary Medicine. He became a professor in 1921. While working as a veterinary professor he invented the Snook hook, a surgical instrument for the spaying of female animals that remains in common use.

During World War I, Snook taught at Ohio State University's Military Aeronautics School, mentoring US Army recruits on rifle and small-arm shooting. He turned down an Army commission in favor of continuing to work at Ohio State University during the war.

=== Sport shooting ===
While he was a student at Ohio State University, Snook became interested in sport shooting. By 1911 he held a world record in revolver shooting. Snook won gold in the men's 50-meter team pistol event at the 1913 ISSF World Shooting Championships at Camp Perry. Also in 1913, he became the first civilian to win the Civilian Marksmanship Program's National Trophy Individual Pistol Match. Snook was a member of the Columbus Revolver Club. He won the Peters Challenge Trophy in the Indoor Rifle Championships of Ohio and Indiana multiple times.

In 1917, Snook became an editor of a monthly magazine about guns and ammunition and was paid US$100 (equivalent to $2,513 in 2025) per month. Because he was known for working at Ohio State, Snook wrote articles using pen names such as "Kingfisher", "Kingman", and "Wesley King". While he was well known for his skill in sport shooting, he was also skilled in fly fishing, which he said was his "first love".

Snook was chosen as an alternate for the US Olympic Pistol Team at the 1920 Summer Olympics in Antwerp, Belgium. He competed when another team member was unable to. With Snook, the team placed first in both the men's 30-meter team military pistol event and the men's 50-meter team pistol competitions. Snook also coached fellow Olympic multi-medalist Raymond Bracken.

== Murder of Theora Hix ==
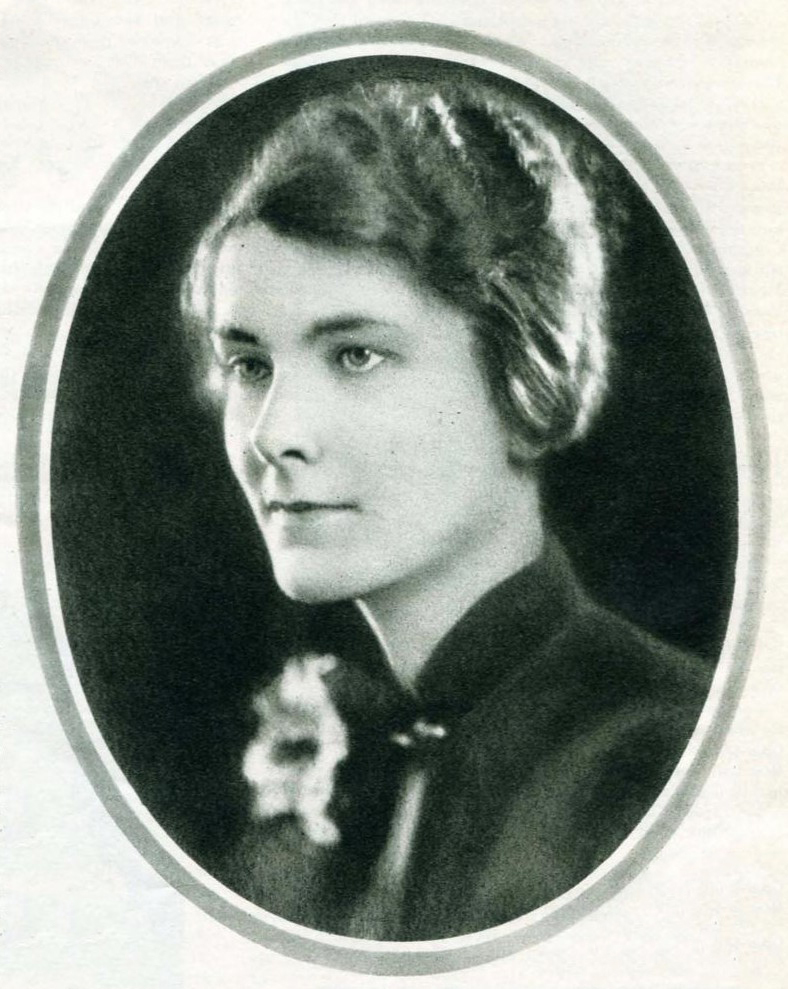
Theora Hix

On September 11, 1922, Snook married sixth-grade teacher Helen Marple. The two had a son who died in infancy before having a daughter named Mary. In June 1926, he met Theora Hix, a student doing stenography work for the Ohio State University veterinary school. When they met, she was 22 and he was 45. The two began an extramarital sexual affair which lasted for three years. According to Snook, at the start of their relationship, Hix recommended several books about sexual topics to him, as she was more experienced in that area than he was.

During the affair, Snook and Hix rented a room on West Hubbard Avenue, which the media would later label as their "love nest". They told the landlady that they were a married couple of salt salespeople. According to Snook's testimony, Hix was a sadomasochist with a large appetite for sex. She allegedly frequently made mention of her previous partner, Marion Meyers, and taunted Snook by saying that Meyers had a larger penis and was better at sex than him. The two also experimented with drugs such as Cannabis indica and Lytta vesicatoria, which are both used as aphrodisiacs. Snook testified that, over the course of the affair, Hix became discontent with "normal sex". She introduced him to fellatio, which he said she performed on him ten times. Snook told interviewers that he and Hix never loved each other, and that their affair was only "practical and pleasing".

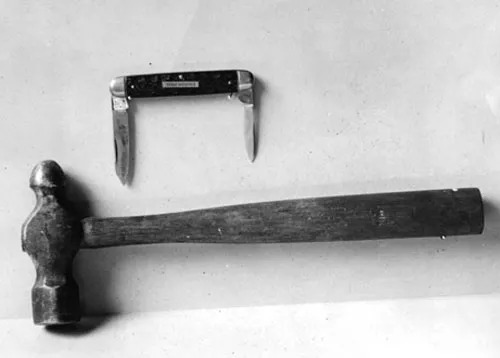
The ball-peen hammer and pocketknife used by Snook in the murder

On June 13, 1929, near the Scioto Country Club, Snook and Hix had sex in his car. Afterwards, Snook hit Hix with a ball-peen hammer multiple times before cutting her jugular vein with a pocketknife. According to Snook's testimony, Hix was angry that he said he planned to visit his mother. He testified that she had threatened to murder his wife and child and that he hit her after she had reached for her gun. He claimed that he cut her jugular vein in order to end her suffering.

Hix's body was discovered on the morning of June 14 by two sixteen-year-old boys near a shooting range outside of Columbus, Ohio. That afternoon, Hix was reported missing by her roommate and police identified the body as hers. Police discovered that Snook had rented a room for himself and Hix. Hix's hat and gloves were found in Snook's car, and blood stains were found on the car door and on his clothing. Snook was arrested on June 15.

Snook confessed to the crime, but during the course of the trial he rescinded his confession because he was coerced by police and prosecutors. He claimed that he was physically struck by state prosecutor Jack Chester; this was verified by Police Chief Harry French, who witnessed the attack. Snook's counsel invoked an insanity defense and self-defense plea, arguing that Hix had driven Snook mad by getting him addicted to narcotics and aphrodisiacs. Snook also stated that Hix had abused him through sexual control. The prosecution argued that Hix could not have been as sexually deviant as Snook claimed, citing the fact that she wore one-piece underwear, which was considered modest and old-fashioned for the time.

The trial received significant national media attention. Courtroom sketches of the trial were created by Milton Caniff for The Columbus Dispatch. Transcripts of Snook's sexually explicit testimony were sold by a court reporter before copies were seized by authorities. The jury took 28 minutes to deliberate before finding Snook guilty of murder in the first degree on August 14, 1929. Snook was then sentenced to death by electrocution.

Prison warden P. E. Thomas alleged that, prior to his execution, Snook admitted to him that he had lied in his testimony, and that the murder was premeditated. According to Thomas, Snook said that he murdered Hix because she had threatened to expose their affair, which would ruin his reputation. Snook was executed on February 28, 1930, at the Ohio Penitentiary by electric chair. He was buried in Green Lawn Cemetery after a short service at the King Avenue Methodist Church. Following her husband's execution, Helen and her daughter returned to her maiden name Marple. To protect the family's privacy, Snook's surname was excluded from his gravestone, which is labelled as only "James Howard". At the family's request, the exact location of the grave was kept a secret from the public until 2005.

== See also ==
- List of Ohio State University people
- List of professional sportspeople convicted of crimes
- List of people executed in the United States in 1930
