= Anders Andersson (sport shooter) =

Swedish sport shooter

Personal information
- Born: 2 November 1875 Eskilstuna, Sweden
- Died: 6 March 1945 (aged 69) Eskilstuna, Sweden

Sport
- Sport: Sports shooting
Medal record
Men's shooting
Representing Sweden
Olympic Games
| Silver medal – second place | 1920 Antwerp | Team free pistol |

Anders Wilhelm Andersson (2 November 1875 – 6 March 1945) was a Swedish sport shooter who competed in the 1920 Summer Olympics. In 1920 he won the silver medal as member of the Swedish team in the team free pistol competition. In the individual free pistol event, he finished sixth.
