= Domenico Giambonini =

Swiss sport shooter

Personal information
- Born: 11 November 1868 Lugano, Switzerland
- Died: 8 August 1956 (aged 87) Bellinzona, Switzerland

Sport
- Sport: Sports shooting
Medal record
Men's shooting
Representing Switzerland
Olympic Games
Bronze medal – third place	1920 Antwerp	Team military pistol

Domenico Giambonini (11 November 1868 – 8 August 1956) was a Swiss sport shooter who competed in the 1920 Summer Olympics. He was born in Lugano and died in Bellinzona.

In 1920, he won a bronze medal as a member of the Swiss team in the team 30 metre military pistol competition. He was also part of the Swiss team, which finished ninth in the team 50 metre free pistol competition.
