= Fernando Soledade =

Brazilian sports shooter

Personal information
- Born: 5 February 1879
- Died: 6 May 1959 (aged 80)

Sport
- Sport: Sports shooting
Medal record
Men's shooting
Representing Brazil
Olympic Games
Bronze medal – third place	1920 Antwerp	Team 50m free pistol

Fernando Soledade (5 February 1879 – 6 May 1959) was a Brazilian sports shooter. He competed in three events at the 1920 Summer Olympics winning a bronze medal in the team 50 m free pistol.
