= Cornelis van Altenburg =

Sports shooter

Personal information
- Full name: Cornelis Gerardus Willem van Altenburg
- Nationality: Dutch
- Born: 24 July 1871 Dordrecht, Netherlands
- Died: 2 August 1953 (aged 82) Dordrecht, Netherlands

Sport
- Sport: Sports shooting

Cornelis van Altenburg (24 July 1871 – 2 August 1953) was a Dutch sports shooter. He competed at the 1908 Summer Olympics and the 1920 Summer Olympics.

== Biography ==
Cornelis van Altenburg was married to Anna Maria Frederica Balck (1900 Rotterdam), daughter of Johann August Balck, owner of an old Rhineship company (J.A. Balck) in Rotterdam - still working.
