= Joseph Jehle =

Swiss sports shooter

Sport
- Sport: Sports shooting
Medal record
Men's shooting
Representing Switzerland
Olympic Games
Bronze medal – third place	1920 Antwerp	Team military pistol
Bronze medal – third place	1920 Antwerp	Team military rifle

Joseph Jehle was a Swiss sports shooter. He competed at the 1920 Summer Olympics winning two bronze medals.
