= Hans Egli =

Swiss sports shooter

Personal information
- Born: 22 October 1862 Flawil, Switzerland
- Died: 11 September 1925 (aged 62) Zurich, Switzerland

Sport
- Sport: Sports shooting
Medal record
Men's shooting
Representing Switzerland
Olympic Games
Bronze medal – third place	1920 Antwerp	Team military pistol

Hans Walter Egli was a Swiss sports shooter. He competed in two events at the 1920 Summer Olympics winning a bronze medal in the team military pistol.
