= Fritz Zulauf =

Swiss sports shooter (1883–1941)

Personal information
- Born: 19 April 1883
- Died: 5 December 1941 (aged 58) Zürich, Switzerland

Sport
- Sport: Sports shooting
Medal record
Men's shooting
Representing Switzerland
Olympic Games
| Bronze medal – third place | 1920 Antwerp | 30m military pistol |
| Bronze medal – third place | 1920 Antwerp | Team 30m military pistol |

Fritz Zulauf (19 April 1883 – 5 December 1941) was a Swiss sport shooter who competed in the 1920 Summer Olympics.

In 1920, he won a bronze medal in the 30 metre military pistol event and a second bronze medal as a member of the Swiss team in the team 30 metre military pistol competition. He was also part of the Swiss team, which finished ninth in the team 50 metre free pistol competition.
