= Georgios Moraitinis =

Greek sport shooter

Personal information
- Born: 1892 Egypt
- Died: Unknown

Sport
- Sport: Sports shooting
Medal record
Men's shooting
Representing Greece
Olympic Games
Silver medal – second place	1920 Antwerp	team military pistol

Georgios Moraitinis (Greek: Γεώργιος Μωραϊτίνης, born 1892, date of death unknown) was a Greek sport shooter. He competed in the 1920 Summer Olympics and in the 1924 Summer Olympics.

== Career ==
Moraitinis was born in Egypt.

In 1920, he won the silver medal as member of the Greek team in the team 30 metre military pistol event.

In the 1920 Summer Olympics he also participated in the following events:

- Team 50 metre free pistol – fourth place
- Team free rifle – 13th place
- 300 metre free rifle, three positions – result unknown

Four years later at the 1924 Summer Olympics he participated in the following events:

- Team free rifle – twelfth place
- 25 metre rapid fire pistol – 37th place
- 50 metre rifle, prone – 58th place
