= Gustave Amoudruz =

Swiss sports shooter (1885–1963)

Personal information
- Born: 23 March 1885 Geneva, Switzerland
- Died: 28 December 1963 (aged 78) Geneva, Switzerland

Sport
- Sport: Sports shooting
Medal record
Men's shooting
Representing Switzerland
Olympic Games
| Bronze medal – third place | 1920 Antwerp | Team military pistol |
| Bronze medal – third place | 1920 Antwerp | Team free rifle |

Gustave Amoudruz (23 March 1885 – 28 December 1963) was a Swiss sports shooter. He competed at the 1920 Summer Olympics winning two bronze medals.
