= Alexandros Vrasivanopoulos =

Greek sport shooter

Personal information
- Born: 1890 Volos, Greece
- Died: Unknown

Sport
- Sport: Sports shooting
Medal record
Men's shooting
Representing Greece
Olympic Games
Silver medal – second place	1920 Antwerp	team military pistol

Alexandros Vrasivanopoulos (Greek: Αλέξανδρος Βρασιβανόπουλος, born 1890, date of death unknown) was a Greek sport shooter who competed in the 1920 Summer Olympics.

In the 1920 Summer Olympics he won the silver medal as member of the Greek team in the team 30 metre military pistol event.

He also participated in the following events:

- Team 50 metre free pistol – fourth place
- Team free rifle – 13th place
- 300 metre free rifle, three positions – result unknown

He was born in Volos.
