= Alexandros Theofilakis =

Greek sport shooter

Personal information
- Born: 1877 Sparta, Greece
- Died: Unknown

Sport
- Sport: Sports shooting
Medal record
Men's shooting
Representing Greece
Olympic Games
| Silver medal – second place | 1920 Antwerp | Team 50m army pistol |
Intercalated Games
| Silver medal – second place | 1906 Athens | 25m army pistol |

Alexandros Theofilakis (Greek: Αλέξανδρος Θεοφιλάκης, born 1877) was a Greek shooter.

== Career ==
Theofilakis competed at the Summer Olympics in 1896, 1908, 1912, 1920 and 1924 Summer Olympics.

At the 1906 Intercalated Games, he won a silver medal at 25 m army pistol (standard model) event. In 1920 he won another silver medal, this time in the team 50m army pistol event.
