= Ioannis Theofilakis =

Greek sport shooter (1879–1968)

Personal information
- Born: 1879 Sparta, Greece
- Died: 1968 (aged 88–89)

Sport
- Sport: Sport shooting
Medal record
Men's shooting
Representing Greece
Olympic Games
Silver medal – second place	1920 Antwerp	Team 30 m army pistol

Ioannis Theofilakis (Theophilakis) (Greek: Ιωάννης Θεοφιλάκης, 1879–1968) was a Greek sport shooter who competed at five Olympic games, and the 1906 Intercalated Games. He competed at the 1896 Summer Olympics in Athens. He also competed at the 1908 Summer Olympics, the 1912 Summer Olympics, the 1920 Summer Olympics where he won silver, and at the 1924 Summer Olympics.

== Biography ==
Ioannis Theofilakis competed in all five of the shooting events: military rifle, free rifle, military pistol, rapid fire pistol, and free pistol.

In 1896 he competed in two rifle events. In the military rifle, he was placed ninth, with a score of 1,261. In the second string of 10 shots, he scored 312. His score and place in the free rifle event is unknown, except that he did not win a medal.

For the 1906 Olympics there are currently no records found on his achievements, except that he did not win any medals.

In the 1908 Olympics he participated in four events: men's team free rifle, where he placed ninth; men's team military rifle, where he placed seventh; men's individual pistol, where he placed twenty ninth; and men's team pistol, where he placed seventh.

In the 1912 Olympics he participated in eleven events: 25 m team small-bore rifle, where he placed fourth; 50 m team small-bore rifle, where he placed fifth; 30 m team military pistol, where he placed fifth; team rifle, where he placed seventh; 50 m rifle, prone, where he placed thirty-second; 600 m free rifle, where he placed thirty-fourth; 300 m military rifle 3 positions, where he placed seventy-fifth; 25 m small-bore rifle, where he placed twenty-first; 100 m deer single shots, where he placed twenty-ninth; 50 m pistol, where he placed eighteenth; and 25 m rapid fire pistol, where he placed twenty-third.

In the 1920 Olympics he participated in eleven events: 50 m free pistol, where he placed tenth; 50 m small-bore rifle unknown; 300 m rifle 3 positions unknown; 600 m military rifle prone, where he placed fourth; 300 m team military rifle prone, where he placed eleventh; 600 m team military rifle prone, where he placed seventh; 50 m team small-bore rifle, where he placed tenth; 300 m team military rifle standing, where he placed thirteenth; 50 m team free pistol, where he placed fourth; team free rifle, where he placed thirteenth; and 30 m team military pistol, where he placed second (silver).

At the age of 48 in the 1924 Olympics he participated in four events: team free rifle, where he was placed twelfth; 25 m rapid fire pistol, where he was placed fortieth; 50 m rifle prone, where he was placed forty-first; and 600 m free rifle, where he was placed forty first.
