= Shooting at the 1920 Summer Olympics – Men's 300 metre team military rifle, prone =

Men's 300 metre team military rifle, prone at the Games of the VII Olympiad
- Venue: Beverloo Camp
- Date: 29 July 1920
- Competitors: 75 from 15 nations

Medalists
1st place, gold medalist(s)		Morris Fisher, Joseph Jackson, Willis Augustus Lee, Carl Osburn, Lloyd Spooner; United States
2nd place, silver medalist(s)		Léon Johnson, André Parmentier, Achille Paroche, Georges Roes, Émile Rumeau; France
3rd place, bronze medalist(s)		Voitto Kolho, Kalle Lappalainen, Veli Nieminen, Vilho Vauhkonen, Magnus Wegelius; Finland

The men's 300 metre team military rifle, prone was a shooting sports event held as part of the Shooting at the 1920 Summer Olympics programme. It was the third (and last) appearance for military rifle events but the first time that medals were awarded for teams in the prone position. The competition was held on 29 July 1920. 75 shooters from 15 nations competed.

== Results ==
The scores of the five shooters were summed to give a team score. The maximum score was 300.

Place	Shooter	Score
1
1	United States	289
1	Carl Osburn	59
1	Lloyd Spooner	59
1	Morris Fisher	59
1	Willis Augustus Lee	57
1	Joseph Jackson	55
2
2	France	283
2	Léon Johnson	
2	Achille Paroche	
2	Émile Rumeau	
2	André Parmentier	58
2	Georges Roes	
3
3	Finland	281
3	Vilho Vauhkonen	59
3	Kalle Lappalainen	57
3	Veli Nieminen	57
3	Magnus Wegelius	57
3	Voitto Kolho	51
4
4	Switzerland	281
4	Fritz Kuchen	59
4	Albert Tröndle	
4	Arnold Rösli	
4	Walter Lienhard	
4	Caspar Widmer	
5
5	Sweden	281
5	Hugo Johansson	60
5	Mauritz Eriksson	
5	Erik Blomqvist	
5	Ture Holmberg	
5	Werner Jernström	
6
6	Norway	280
6	Østen Østensen	
6	Otto Olsen	
6	Olaf Sletten	
6	Albert Helgerud	
6	Jacob Onsrud	
7
7	Spain	278
7	José Bento	
7	Antonio Bonilla	
7	Domingo Rodríguez	
7	Luis Calvet	
7	Antonio Moreira	
8
8	South Africa	276
8	Robert Bodley	
8	George Lishman	
8	David Smith	
8	Mark Paxton	
8	Fred Morgan	
9
9	Italy	272
9	Ricardo Ticchi	
9	Raffaele Frasca	
9	Alfredo Galli	
9	Camillo Isnardi	
9	Peppy Campus	
10
10	Czechoslovakia	271
10	Rudolf Jelen	
10	Josef Sucharda	
10	Václav Kindl	
10	Josef Linert	
10	Antonín Brych	
11
11	Greece	270
11	Andreas Vikhos	
11	Ioannis Theofilakis	
11	Alexandros Theofilakis	
11	Konstantinos Kefalas	
11	Emmanouil Peristerakis	
12
12	Netherlands	269
12	Gerard van den Bergh	
12	Antonius Bouwens	
12	Herman Bouwens	
12	Cornelis van Dalen	
12	Jan Brussaard	
13
13	Denmark	268
13	Lars Jørgen Madsen	
13	Niels Larsen	
13	Peter Petersen	
13	Otto Plantener	
13	Anton Andersen	
14
14	Belgium	264
14	Paul Van Asbroeck	
14	Joseph Janssens	
14	Vincent Libert	
14	Louis Ryskens	
14	Conrad Adriaenssens	
15
15	Portugal	256
15	Hermínio Rebelo	
15	António dos Santos	
15	António Ferreira	
15	António Martins	
15	Dario Canas	
