= Shooting at the 1920 Summer Olympics – Men's 600 metre team military rifle, prone =

Men's 600 metre team military rifle, prone at the Games of the VII Olympiad
- Venue: Beverloo Camp
- Dates: 29 July – 2 August 1920
- Competitors: 70 from 14 nations

Medalists
1st place, gold medalist(s)		Dennis Fenton, Joseph Jackson, Willis Augustus Lee, Ollie Schriver, Lloyd Spooner; United States
2nd place, silver medalist(s)		Robert Bodley, Ferdinand Buchanan, George Harvey, Fred Morgan, David Smith; South Africa
3rd place, bronze medalist(s)		Erik Blomqvist, Mauritz Eriksson, Hugo Johansson, Gustaf Adolf Jonsson, Erik Ohlsson; Sweden

The men's 600 metre team military rifle, prone was a shooting sports event held as part of the Shooting at the 1920 Summer Olympics programme. It was the third (and last) appearance for military rifle events but the first time that medals were awarded for teams in the prone position. The competition was held on 29 and 30 July and on 2 August 1920. 70 shooters from 14 nations competed.

== Results ==
The scores of the five shooters were summed to give a team score. The maximum score was 300. Two shoot-offs were necessary to find the winning team.

Place	Shooter	Score	Shoot-off 1	Shoot-off 2
1
1	United States	287	283	284
1	Dennis Fenton	60	56	58
1	Willis Augustus Lee	58	57	56
1	Lloyd Spooner	57	56	57
1	Ollie Schriver	57	58	59
1	Joseph Jackson	55	56	54
2
2	South Africa	287	283	279
2	Robert Bodley	59		
2	Ferdinand Buchanan	58		
2	George Harvey	58		
2	Fred Morgan	58		
2	David Smith	54		
3
3	Sweden	287	275	
3	Mauritz Eriksson	59		
3	Hugo Johansson	59		
3	Erik Blomqvist	58		
3	Erik Ohlsson	57		
3	Gustaf Adolf Jonsson	54		
4
4	Norway	282		
4	Østen Østensen			
4	Otto Olsen			
4	Olaf Sletten			
4	Albert Helgerud			
4	Jacob Onsrud			
5
5	France	280		
5	Léon Johnson			
5	Achille Paroche			
5	Émile Rumeau			
5	André Parmentier			
5	Georges Roes			
6
6	Switzerland	279		
6	Fritz Kuchen			
6	Albert Tröndle			
6	Arnold Rösli			
6	Walter Lienhard			
6	Caspar Widmer			
7
7	Greece	270		
7	Andreas Vikhos			
7	Ioannis Theofilakis			
7	Alexandros Theofilakis			
7	Konstantinos Kefalas			
7	Emmanouil Peristerakis			
8
8	Finland	268		
8	Veli Nieminen	57		
8	Voitto Kolho	55		
8	Vilho Vauhkonen	53		
8	Magnus Wegelius	52		
8	Kalle Lappalainen	51		
9
9	Netherlands	266		
9	Gerard van den Bergh			
9	Antonius Bouwens			
9	Herman Bouwens			
9	Cornelis van Dalen			
9	Jan Brussaard			
10
10	Belgium	264		
10	Paul Van Asbroeck			
10	Conrad Adriaenssens			
10	Arthur Balbaert			
10	François Ceulemans			
10	Joseph Haesaerts			
11
11	Czechoslovakia	258		
11	Rudolf Jelen			
11	Josef Sucharda			
11	Václav Kindl			
11	Josef Linert			
11	Antonín Brych			
12
12	Italy	257		
12	Ricardo Ticchi			
12	Raffaele Frasca			
12	Alfredo Galli			
12	Camillo Isnardi			
12	Peppy Campus			
13
13	Spain	253		
13	José Bento			
13	Antonio Bonilla			
13	Domingo Rodríguez			
13	Luis Calvet			
13	Antonio Moreira			
14
14	Portugal	248		
14	Hermínio Rebelo			
14	António dos Santos			
14	António Ferreira			
14	António Martins			
14	Dario Canas			
