= Shooting at the 1920 Summer Olympics – Men's 300 metre team military rifle, standing =

Sports event in the 1920 Summer Olympics

Men's 300 metre team military rifle, standing at the Games of the VII Olympiad
- Venue: Beverloo Camp
- Date: 29 July 1920
- Competitors: 75 from 15 nations

Medalists
1st place, gold medalist(s)		Niels Larsen, Lars Jørgen Madsen, Anders Peter Nielsen, Anders Petersen, Erik Sætter-Lassen; Denmark
2nd place, silver medalist(s)		Thomas Brown, Willis A. Lee, Lawrence Nuesslein, Carl Osburn, Lloyd Spooner; United States
3rd place, bronze medalist(s)		Olle Ericsson, Mauritz Eriksson, Walfrid Hellman, Hugo Johansson, Leon Lagerlöf; Sweden

The men's 300 metre team military rifle, standing was a shooting sports event held as part of the Shooting at the 1920 Summer Olympics programme. It was the third (and last) appearance for military rifle events but the first time that medals were awarded for teams in the standing position. The competition was held on 29 July 1920. 75 shooters from 15 nations competed.

== Results ==
The scores of the five shooters were summed to give a team score. The maximum score was 300.

Place	Shooter	Score
1
1	Denmark	266
1	Lars Jørgen Madsen	55
1	Erik Sætter-Lassen	54
1	Anders Petersen	53
1	Anders Peter Nielsen	53
1	Niels Larsen	51
2
2	United States	255
2	Lawrence Nuesslein	56
2	Carl Osburn	53
2	Lloyd Spooner	50
2	Willis A. Lee	48
2	Thomas Brown	48
3
3	Sweden	255
3	Olle Ericsson	54
3	Walfrid Hellman	53
3	Mauritz Eriksson	52
3	Hugo Johansson	49
3	Leon Lagerlöf	47
4
4	Italy	251
4	Ricardo Ticchi	
4	Camillo Isnardi	
4	Luigi Favretti	
4	Giancarlo Boriani	
4	Sem De Ranieri	
5
5	France	249
5	Léon Johnson	
5	Achille Paroche	
5	Émile Rumeau	
5	André Parmentier	
5	Georges Roes	
6
6	Norway	242
6	Østen Østensen	
6	Otto Olsen	
6	Olaf Sletten	
6	Albert Helgerud	
6	Gudbrand Skatteboe	
7
7	Finland	235
7	Kalle Lappalainen	
7	Vilho Vauhkonen	
7	Magnus Wegelius	
7	Voitto Kolho	
7	Nestor Toivonen	
8
8	Switzerland	234
8	Fritz Kuchen	
8	Albert Tröndle	
8	Arnold Rösli	
8	Walter Lienhard	
8	Caspar Widmer	
9
9	South Africa	233
9	Robert Bodley	
9	Fred Morgan	
9	Mark Paxton	
9	Ferdinand Buchanan	
9	David Smith	
10
10	Netherlands	228
10	Gerard van den Bergh	
10	Antonius Bouwens	
10	Herman Bouwens	
10	Cornelis van Dalen	
10	Jan Brussaard	
11
11	Portugal	226
11	Hermínio Rebelo	
11	António dos Santos	
11	António Ferreira	
11	António Martins	
11	Dario Canas	
12
12	Belgium	217
12	Paul Van Asbroeck	
12	Joseph Janssens	
12	Vincent Libert	
12	Louis Ryskens	
12	Conrad Adriaenssens	
13
13	Greece	209
13	Andreas Vikhos	
13	Ioannis Theofilakis	
13	Konstantinos Kefalas	
13	Vasileios Xylinakis	
13	Emmanouil Peristerakis	
14
14	Czechoslovakia	200
14	Rudolf Jelen	
14	Josef Sucharda	
14	Václav Kindl	
14	Josef Linert	
14	Antonín Brych	
14	Spain	200
14	José Bento	
14	Antonio Bonilla	
14	Domingo Rodríguez	
14	Luis Calvet	
14	Antonio Moreira	
