= Shooting at the 1920 Summer Olympics – Men's 300 metre free rifle, three positions =

Olympic shooting event

Men's 300 metre free rifle, three positions at the Games of the VII Olympiad
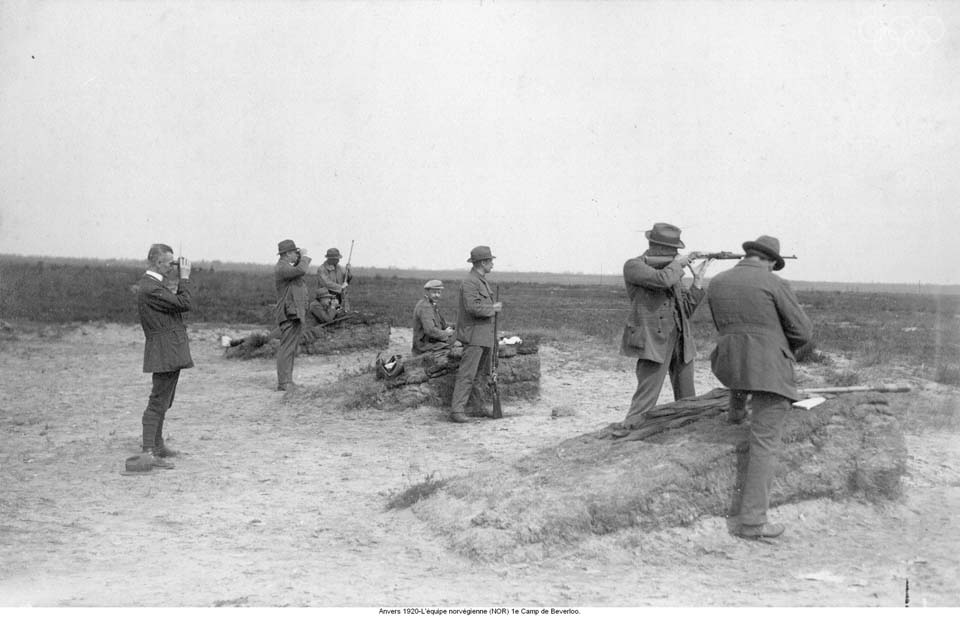
- Shooting at the 1920 Summer Olympics
- Venue: Beverloo Camp
- Date: 31 July 1920
- Competitors: 70 from 14 nations
- Winning score: 996 OR

Medalists
1st place, gold medalist(s)		Morris Fisher; United States
2nd place, silver medalist(s)		Niels Larsen; Denmark
3rd place, bronze medalist(s)		Østen Østensen; Norway

The men's 300 m rifle three positions was a shooting sports event held as part of the Shooting programs at the 1920 Summer Olympics programme. It was the fourth appearance of the 300 metre rifle three positions event at an Olympic Games. The competition was held on 31 July 1920, with 70 shooters from 14 nations competing. The event was won by Morris Fisher of the United States, the nation's first victory in the event. Niels Larsen of Denmark earned silver (the first man to win multiple medals in the event, adding to his 1912 bronze), while Østen Østensen of Norway took bronze.

== Background ==
This was the fourth appearance of the men's 300 metre three-positions rifle event, which was held 11 times between 1900 and 1972. Seven of the top 10 shooters from 1912 returned: gold medalist Paul Colas of France, silver medalist Lars Jørgen Madsen of Denmark (who had also competed in 1900 and 1908), bronze medalist Niels Larsen of Denmark, fourth-place finisher Hugo Johansson of Sweden, fifth-place finisher Gudbrand Skatteboe of Norway, seventh-place finisher (and 1908 gold medalist) Albert Helgerud of Norway, and tenth-place finisher Erik Blomqvist of Sweden.

Czechoslovakia, Greece, Italy, and Spain made their debut in the event. Denmark, France, and Norway each made their fourth appearance, the only nations to have competed at every appearance of the event to date.

== Participating nations and athletes ==
The scores are only known for the shooters of the best eight nations, and so according to sports-reference.com 40 shooters from 8 nations participated in this event. However the scores for the Men's team free rifle uses the scores from this event (the summed score of the five athletes form each nation). Because these events were contested concurrently, shooters that competed in the team event should have competed automatically in this event. In that case 5 athletes from Italy, Spain, Belgium, Greece, Czechoslovakia and South Africa would also have competed in this event, making 70 athletes from 14 nations.

== Competition format ==
The competition had each shooter fire 120 shots, 40 shots in each of three positions: prone, standing, and kneeling (with sitting permitted instead in 1920). The target was 1 metre in diameter, with 10 scoring rings; targets were set at a distance of 300 metres. Thus, the maximum score possible was 1200 points. Any rifle could be used. As in 1900 (but not 1908 or 1912), the scores for each individual were summed to give a team score.

== Records ==
Prior to the competition, the existing world and Olympic records were as follows.

World record				
Olympic record	Paul Colas (FRA)	987	Stockholm, Sweden	2 July 1912

The top two shooters in 1920 broke the Olympic record. Morris Fisher ended with the new record, at 996 points; Niels Larsen had 989.

== Schedule ==
Date	Time	Round
Saturday, 31 July 1920		Final

== Results ==
The scores are only known for the shooters of the best eight nations. The maximum score was 1200. The scores of this event were summed to the result of the team free rifle competition.

Rank	Shooter	Nation	Score				Notes
Rank	Shooter	Nation	Prone	Standing	Kneeling	Total	Notes
1st place, gold medalist(s)	Morris Fisher	United States	347	288	361	996	OR
2nd place, silver medalist(s)	Niels Larsen	Denmark	328	320	341	989	
3rd place, bronze medalist(s)	Østen Østensen	Norway	347	309	324	980	
4	Carl Osburn	United States	353	280	347	980	
5	Gudbrand Skatteboe	Norway	351	294	330	975	
5	Lloyd Spooner	United States	341	306	328	975	
7	Voitto Kolho	Finland	357	301	316	974	
7	Mauritz Eriksson	Sweden	347	294	333	974	
9–70	Vilho Vauhkonen	Finland	336	295	335	966	
9–70	Willis Augustus Lee	United States	341	277	347	965	
9–70	Fritz Kuchen	Switzerland	329	307	325	961	
9–70	Hugo Johansson	Sweden	345	282	334	961	
9–70	Dennis Fenton	United States	351	267	342	960	
9–70	Gustave Amoudruz	Switzerland	323	287	349	959	
9–70	Albert Helgerud	Norway	337	302	316	955	
9–70	Lars Jørgen Madsen	Denmark	324	307	320	951	
9–70	Werner Schneeberger	Switzerland	352	269	326	947	
9–70	Kalle Lappalainen	Finland	347	270	328	945	
9–70	Gerard van den Bergh	Netherlands	Unknown			939	
9–70	Veli Nieminen	Finland	338	263	333	934	
9–70	Olaf Sletten	Norway	317	303	310	930	
9–70	Achille Paroche	France	339	261	329	929	
9–70	Ulrich Fahrner	Switzerland	338	264	323	925	
9–70	Erik Blomqvist	Sweden	345	272	307	924	
9–70	Peter Petersen	Denmark	324	303	296	923	
9–70	Georges Roes	France	322	274	313	909	
9–70	Antonius Bouwens	Netherlands	Unknown			909	
9–70	Otto Olsen	Norway	343	283	282	908	
9–70	Bernard Siegenthaler	Switzerland	306	282	318	906	
9–70	André Parmentier	France	313	297	295	905	
9–70	Niels Laursen	Denmark	294	280	329	903	
9–70	Viktor Knutsson	Sweden	303	278	315	896	
9–70	Paul Colas	France	338	260	295	893	
9–70	Anton Andersen	Denmark	285	301	292	878	
9–70	Jan Brussaard	Netherlands	Unknown			866	
9–70	Albert Regnier	France	320	241	289	850	
9–70	Magnus Wegelius	Finland	320	236	293	849	
9–70	Herman Bouwens	Netherlands	Unknown			841	
9–70	Leon Lagerlöf	Sweden	300	261	275	836	
9–70	Cornelis van Dalen	Netherlands	Unknown			828	
9–70	Alfredo Galli	Italy	Unknown				
9–70	Raffaele Frasca	Italy	Unknown				
9–70	Peppy Campus	Italy	Unknown				
9–70	Franco Micheli	Italy	Unknown				
9–70	Ricardo Ticchi	Italy	Unknown				
9–70	Robert Bodley	South Africa	Unknown				
9–70	Fred Morgan	South Africa	Unknown				
9–70	Mark Paxton	South Africa	Unknown				
9–70	David Smith	South Africa	Unknown				
9–70	George Harvey	South Africa	Unknown				
9–70	José Bento	Spain	Unknown				
9–70	Antonio Bonilla	Spain	Unknown				
9–70	Domingo Rodríguez	Spain	Unknown				
9–70	Luis Calvet	Spain	Unknown				
9–70	Antonio Moreira	Spain	Unknown				
9–70	Paul Van Asbroeck	Belgium	Unknown				
9–70	Conrad Adriaenssens	Belgium	Unknown				
9–70	Arthur Balbaert	Belgium	Unknown				
9–70	Joseph Haesaerts	Belgium	Unknown				
9–70	François Heyens	Belgium	Unknown				
9–70	Alexandros Vrasivanopoulos	Greece	Unknown				
9–70	Alexandros Theofilakis	Greece	Unknown				
9–70	Ioannis Theofilakis	Greece	Unknown				
9–70	Georgios Moraitinis	Greece	Unknown				
9–70	Iason Sappas	Greece	Unknown				
9–70	Rudolf Jelen	Czechoslovakia	Unknown				
9–70	Josef Sucharda	Czechoslovakia	Unknown				
9–70	Václav Kindl	Czechoslovakia	Unknown				
9–70	Josef Linert	Czechoslovakia	Unknown				
9–70	Antonín Brych	Czechoslovakia	Unknown				
