= Shooting at the 1920 Summer Olympics – Men's 300 metre free rifle, team =

Olympic shooting event

Men's team free rifle at the Games of the VII Olympiad
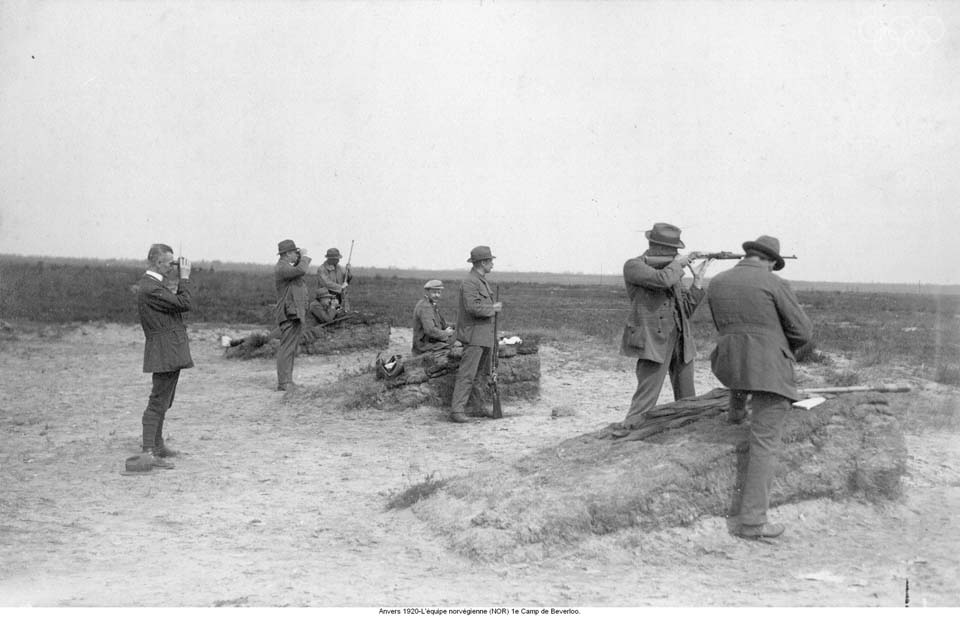
- Norwegian team
- Venue: Beverloo Camp
- Date: 31 July 1920
- Competitors: 70 from 14 nations
- Winning score: 4876

Medalists
1st place, gold medalist(s)		United States: Dennis Fenton; Morris Fisher; Willis A. Lee; Carl Osburn; Lloyd Spooner
2nd place, silver medalist(s)		Norway: Albert Helgerud; Otto Olsen; Østen Østensen; Gudbrand Skatteboe; Olaf Sletten
3rd place, bronze medalist(s)		Switzerland: Gustave Amoudruz; Ulrich Fahrner; Fritz Kuchen; Werner Schneeberger; Bernard Siegenthaler

The men's 300 metre team free rifle was a shooting sports event held as part of the Shooting at the 1920 Summer Olympics programme. It was the fourth and final appearance of the event. The competition was held on 31 July 1920. 70 shooters from 14 nations competed. The event was won by the United States, in its first (and only) appearance in the men's team free rifle. Norway finished with four podium appearances (all at silver or better) in the four appearances of the event, taking silver in 1920. Switzerland earned bronze, its first medal in the event since gold in 1900.

Albert Helgerud and Gudbrand Skatteboe each won their third medal in the event, matching Ole Sæther (1900, 1908, and 1912) for the most ever won; each of those Norwegian shooters had one gold and two silver medals. Østen Østensen earned his second medal, the seventh and last man to achieve multiple medals in the event.

== Background ==
This was the fourth and final appearance of the men's 300 metre team rifle event, which was held 4 times between 1900 and 1920.

Czechoslovakia, Italy, Spain, and the United States each made their debut in the event. Denmark, France, and Norway each made their fourth appearance, having competed in each edition of the event before it was cancelled.

== Competition format ==
The competition had each shooter fire 120 shots, 40 shots in each of three positions: prone, kneeling (or sitting), and standing. The target was 1 metre in diameter, with 10 scoring rings; targets were set at a distance of 300 metres. The five team members' scores were then summed. Thus, the maximum score possible was 6000 points. The scores for the individual and team events were the same.

== Schedule ==
Date	Time	Round
Saturday, 31 July 1920		Final

== Results ==
The scores of the five shooters on each team were the scores from the 300 metre free rifle, three positions event and were summed to give a team score.

Morris Fisher, the individual champion, won his second gold medal.

Rank	Nation	Shooter	Score
1st place, gold medalist(s)	United States	United States total	4876
1st place, gold medalist(s)	United States	Morris Fisher	996
1st place, gold medalist(s)	United States	Carl Osburn	980
1st place, gold medalist(s)	United States	Lloyd Spooner	975
1st place, gold medalist(s)	United States	Willis A. Lee	965
1st place, gold medalist(s)	United States	Dennis Fenton	960
2nd place, silver medalist(s)	Norway	Norway total	4748
2nd place, silver medalist(s)	Norway	Østen Østensen	980
2nd place, silver medalist(s)	Norway	Gudbrand Skatteboe	975
2nd place, silver medalist(s)	Norway	Albert Helgerud	955
2nd place, silver medalist(s)	Norway	Olaf Sletten	930
2nd place, silver medalist(s)	Norway	Otto Olsen	908
3rd place, bronze medalist(s)	Switzerland	Switzerland total	4698
3rd place, bronze medalist(s)	Switzerland	Fritz Kuchen	961
3rd place, bronze medalist(s)	Switzerland	Gustave Amoudruz	959
3rd place, bronze medalist(s)	Switzerland	Werner Schneeberger	947
3rd place, bronze medalist(s)	Switzerland	Ulrich Fahrner	925
3rd place, bronze medalist(s)	Switzerland	Bernard Siegenthaler	906
4	Finland	Finland total	4668
4	Finland	Voitto Kolho	974
4	Finland	Vilho Vauhkonen	966
4	Finland	Kalle Lappalainen	945
4	Finland	Veli Nieminen	934
4	Finland	Magnus Wegelius	849
5	Denmark	Denmark total	4644
5	Denmark	Niels Larsen	989
5	Denmark	Lars Jørgen Madsen	951
5	Denmark	Peter Petersen	923
5	Denmark	Niels Laursen	903
5	Denmark	Anton Andersen	878
6	Sweden	Sweden total	4591
6	Sweden	Mauritz Eriksson	974
6	Sweden	Hugo Johansson	961
6	Sweden	Erik Blomqvist	924
6	Sweden	Viktor Knutsson	896
6	Sweden	Leon Lagerlöf	836
7	France	France total	4487
7	France	Achille Paroche	996
7	France	Georges Roes	980
7	France	André Parmentier	975
7	France	Paul Colas	965
7	France	Albert Regnier	960
8	Netherlands	Netherlands total	4383
8	Netherlands	Gerard van den Bergh	939
8	Netherlands	Antonius Bouwens	909
8	Netherlands	Jan Brussaard	866
8	Netherlands	Herman Bouwens	841
8	Netherlands	Cornelis van Dalen	828
9	Italy	Italy total	4371
9	Italy	Alfredo Galli	
9	Italy	Raffaele Frasca	
9	Italy	Peppy Campus	
9	Italy	Franco Micheli	
9	Italy	Ricardo Ticchi	
10	South Africa	South Africa total	4292
10	South Africa	Robert Bodley	
10	South Africa	Fred Morgan	
10	South Africa	Mark Paxton	
10	South Africa	David Smith	
10	South Africa	George Harvey	
11	Spain	Spain total	4080
11	Spain	José Bento	
11	Spain	Antonio Bonilla	
11	Spain	Domingo Rodríguez	
11	Spain	Luis Calvet	
11	Spain	Antonio Moreira	
12	Belgium	Belgium total	3936
12	Belgium	Paul Van Asbroeck	
12	Belgium	Conrad Adriaenssens	
12	Belgium	Arthur Balbaert	
12	Belgium	Joseph Haesaerts	
12	Belgium	François Heyens	
13	Greece	Greece total	3910
13	Greece	Alexandros Vrasivanopoulos	
13	Greece	Alexandros Theofilakis	
13	Greece	Ioannis Theofilakis	
13	Greece	Georgios Moraitinis	
13	Greece	Iason Sappas	
14	Czechoslovakia	Czechoslovakia total	3542
14	Czechoslovakia	Rudolf Jelen	
14	Czechoslovakia	Josef Sucharda	
14	Czechoslovakia	Václav Kindl	
14	Czechoslovakia	Josef Linert	
14	Czechoslovakia	Antonín Brych	
