= Shooting at the 1920 Summer Olympics – Men's 300 and 600 metre team military rifle, prone =

Men's 300 and 600 metre team military rifle, prone at the Games of the VII Olympiad
- Venue: Beverloo Camp
- Date: 29 July 1920
- Competitors: 70 from 14 nations

Medalists
1st place, gold medalist(s)		Joseph Jackson, Willis A. Lee, Carl Osburn, Oliver Schriver, Lloyd Spooner; United States
2nd place, silver medalist(s)		Albert Helgerud, Otto Olsen, Jacob Onsrud, Østen Østensen, Olaf Sletten; Norway
3rd place, bronze medalist(s)		Eugene Addor, Joseph Jehle, Fritz Kuchen, Werner Schneeberger, Weibel; Switzerland

The men's 300 and 600 metre team military rifle, prone was a shooting sports event held as part of the Shooting at the 1920 Summer Olympics programme. It was the third (and last) appearance for military rifle events but the first time that medals were awarded for teams in the prone position. The competition was held on 29 July 1920. 70 shooters from 14 nations competed.

== Results ==
The scores of the five shooters were summed to give a team score. The maximum score was 600.

Place	Shooter	Score
1
1	United States	573
1	Joseph Jackson	116
1	Willis Augustus Lee	116
1	Oliver Schriver	115
1	Lloyd Spooner	113
1	Carl Osburn	113
2
2	Norway	565
2	Otto Olsen	117
2	Østen Østensen	116
2	Olaf Sletten	114
2	Albert Helgerud	111
2	Jacob Onsrud	107
3
3	Switzerland	563
3	Werner Schneeberger	116
3	Joseph Jehle	114
3	Weibel	114
3	Fritz Kuchen	111
3	Eugene Addor	108
4
4	France	563
4	Léon Johnson	117
4	Achille Paroche	
4	Émile Rumeau	
4	André Parmentier	
4	Georges Roes	
5
5	South Africa	560
5	David Smith	
5	Robert Bodley	
5	Ferdinand Buchanan	
5	George Harvey	
5	Fred Morgan	
6
6	Sweden	558
6	Erik Blomqvist	118
6	Mauritz Eriksson	
6	Hugo Johansson	
6	Bror Andreasson	
6	Gustaf Adolf Jonsson	
7
7	Greece	553
7	Ioannis Theofilakis	
7	Alexandros Theofilakis	
7	Konstantinos Kefalas	
7	Vasileios Xylinakis	
7	Emmanouil Peristerakis	
8
8	Czechoslovakia	536
8	Rudolf Jelen	
8	Josef Sucharda	
8	Václav Kindl	
8	Josef Linert	
8	Antonín Brych	
9
9	Italy	527
9	Ricardo Ticchi	
9	Raffaele Frasca	
9	Camillo Isnardi	
9	Alfredo Galli	
9	Sem De Ranieri	
10
10	Finland	524
10	Veli Nieminen	111
10	Kalle Lappalainen	110
10	Magnus Wegelius	106
10	Voitto Kolho	102
10	Vilho Vauhkonen	95
11
11	Portugal	519
11	Hermínio Rebelo	
11	António dos Santos	
11	António Ferreira	
11	António Martins	
11	Dario Canas	
12
12	Spain	510
12	José Bento	
12	Antonio Bonilla	
12	Domingo Rodríguez	
12	Luis Calvet	
12	Antonio Moreira	
13
13	Netherlands	495
13	Gerard van den Bergh	
13	Antonius Bouwens	
13	Herman Bouwens	
13	Cornelis van Dalen	
13	Jan Brussaard	
14
14	Belgium	469
14	Paul Van Asbroeck	
14	Conrad Adriaenssens	
14	Arthur Balbaert	
14	François Ceulemans	
14	Joseph Haesaerts	
