= Shooting at the 1920 Summer Olympics – Men's 50 metre small-bore rifle =

Men's 50 metre small-bore rifle at the Games of the VII Olympiad
- Venue: Beverloo Camp
- Date: 2 August 1920
- Competitors: 49 from 10 nations

Medalists
1st place, gold medalist(s)		Lawrence Nuesslein	United States
2nd place, silver medalist(s)		Arthur Rothrock	United States
3rd place, bronze medalist(s)		Dennis Fenton	United States

The men's 50 metre small-bore rifle, standing position was a shooting sports event held as part of the Shooting at the 1920 Summer Olympics programme. It was the third appearance of the event but the first time in the standing position. The competition was held on 2 August 1920. 50 shooters from 10 nations competed.

== Results ==
The scores are only known for the shooters of the best four nations. The maximum score was 400. The scores of this event were summed to the result of the team small-bore rifle competition.

Place	Shooter	Total
1	Lawrence Nuesslein (USA)	391
2	Arthur Rothrock (USA)	386
3	Dennis Fenton (USA)	385
-	Sigvard Hultcrantz (SWE)	382
-	Erik Ohlsson (SWE)	381
-	Anton Olsen (NOR)	379
-	Lars Jørgen Madsen (DEN)	378
-	Erik Sætter-Lassen (DEN)	378
-	Albert Helgerud (NOR)	375
-	Leon Lagerlöf (SWE)	375
-	Anders Peter Nielsen (DEN)	374
-	Otto Wegener (DEN)	373
-	Sigvart Johansen (NOR)	373
-	Olaf Sletten (NOR)	371
-	Willis A. Lee (USA)	370
-	Oscar Eriksson (SWE)	370
-	Østen Østensen (NOR)	368
-	Oliver Schriver (USA)	367
-	Christen Møller (DEN)	359
-	Léon Johnson (FRA)	unknown
-	Achille Paroche (FRA)	unknown
-	Émile Rumeau (FRA)	unknown
-	André Parmentier (FRA)	unknown
-	Georges Roes (FRA)	unknown
-	Paul Van Asbroeck (BEL)	unknown
-	Norbert Van Molle (BEL)	unknown
-	Philippe Cammaerts (BEL)	unknown
-	Victor Robert (BEL)	unknown
-	Louis Andrieu (BEL)	unknown
-	Alfredo Galli (ITA)	unknown
-	Raffaele Frasca (ITA)	unknown
-	Peppy Campus (ITA)	unknown
-	Franco Micheli (ITA)	unknown
-	Ricardo Ticchi (ITA)	unknown
-	George Lishman (RSA)	unknown
-	Fred Morgan (RSA)	unknown
-	George Harvey (RSA)	unknown
-	Robert Bodley (RSA)	unknown
-	Mark Paxton (RSA)	unknown
-	José Bento (ESP)	unknown
-	Antonio Bonilla (ESP)	unknown
-	Domingo Rodríguez (ESP)	unknown
-	Luis Calvet (ESP)	unknown
-	Antonio Moreira (ESP)	unknown
-	Andreas Vikhos (GRE)	unknown
-	Ioannis Theofilakis (GRE)	unknown
-	Konstantinos Kefalas (GRE)	unknown
-	Vasileios Xylinakis (GRE)	unknown
-	Emmanouil Peristerakis (GRE)	unknown
