= South Africa at the 1920 Summer Olympics =

- IOC code: RSA (ZAF used at these Games)
- NOC: South African Olympic and Empire Games Association

in Antwerp
- Competitors: 39 in 7 sports
- Medals Ranked 11th: Gold 3 Silver 4 Bronze 3 Total 10

Summer Olympics appearances (overview)
- 1904; 1908; 1912; 1920; 1924; 1928; 1932; 1936; 1948; 1952; 1956; 1960; 1964–1988; 1992; 1996; 2000; 2004; 2008; 2012; 2016; 2020; 2024

The Union of South Africa competed at the 1920 Summer Olympics in Antwerp, Belgium. 39 competitors, 38 men and 1 woman, took part in 34 events in 7 sports.

== Medalists ==
=== Gold ===
- Bevil Rudd — Athletics, Men's 400m
- Clarence Walker — Boxing, Bantamweight
- Louis Raymond — Tennis, Men's singles

=== Silver ===
- Henry Dafel, Clarence Oldfield, Jack Oosterlaak and Bevil Rudd — Athletics, Men's 4 × 400 m relay
- Henry Kaltenbrunn — Cycling, Men's Individual Time Trial
- William Smith and James Walker — Cycling, Men's Tandem
- David Smith, Robert Bodley, Ferdinand Buchanan, George Harvey and Frederick Morgan — Shooting, Men's Team 600m military rifle

=== Bronze ===
- Bevil Rudd — Athletics, Men's 800m
- James Walker, William Smith, Henry Kaltenbrun and Harry Goosen — Cycling, Men's Team pursuit
- Charles Winslow — Tennis, Men's singles

== Aquatics ==
=== Swimming ===
A single swimmer represented South Africa in 1920. It was the nation's second appearance in the sport. Nash did not advance to the final in either event.

Ranks given are within the heat.

Women

Swimmer	Event	Semifinals		Final	
Swimmer	Event	Result	Rank	Result	Rank
Blanche Nash	100 m free	Unknown	5	did not advance	
Blanche Nash	300 m free	Unknown	6	did not advance	

== Athletics ==
13 athletes represented South Africa in 1920. It was the nation's fourth appearance in athletics, a sport in which South Africa had competed each time the country had appeared at the Olympics. The team took three total medals, one of each color, with Rudd winning two on his own and being part of the relay that won the silver. It was the country's best result in athletics to date.

Ranks given are within the heat.

Athlete	Event	Heats		Quarterfinals		Semifinals		Final	
Athlete	Event	Result	Rank	Result	Rank	Result	Rank	Result	Rank
Jacobus Bukes	100 m	11.0	2 Q	11.0	3	did not advance			
Jacobus Bukes	200 m	23.4	3	did not advance					
Henry Dafel	400 m	51.2	2 Q	50.8	1 Q	50.4	3 Q	50.6	6
Henry Dafel	800 m	—N/a		1:59.2	3 Q		6	did not advance	
Leonard Dixon	100 m		3	did not advance					
James Doig	800 m	—N/a		1:59.6	4 Q	2:01.5	7	did not advance	
Christian Gitsham	Marathon	—N/a						did not finish	
Francis Irvine	100 m		3	did not advance					
Francis Irvine	200 m	23.3	3	did not advance					
Francis Irvine	400 m	52.5	4	did not advance					
Harold Jeppe	110 m hurdles	—N/a			3	did not advance			
Cecil McMaster	3 km walk	—N/a				13:48.5	2 Q	13:23.6	4
Cecil McMaster	10 km walk	—N/a				51:39.0	2 Q	50:04.0	4
Clarence Oldfield	400 m	52.2	2 Q	51.1	5	did not advance			
Jack Oosterlaak	100 m	11.0	1 Q	11.0	1 Q		4	did not advance	
Jack Oosterlaak	200 m	23.2	2 Q	23.0	1 Q	22.7	3 Q	22.4	6
Leonard Richardson	Cross country	—N/a						did not finish	
Bevil Rudd	400 m	51.6	1 Q	51.3	2 Q	49.7	2 Q	49.6	1st place, gold medalist(s)
Bevil Rudd	800 m	—N/a		1:55.0	1 Q	1:57.0	1 Q	1:53.6	3rd place, bronze medalist(s)
Adriaan "Attie" van Heerden	400 m hurdles	—N/a		did not finish		did not advance			
Jacobus Bukes; Henry Dafel; Francis Irvine; Jack Oosterlaak	4 × 100 m relay	—N/a				44.4	3	did not advance	
Henry Dafel; Clarence Oldfield; Jack Oosterlaak; Bevil Rudd	4 × 400 m relay	—N/a				3:38.6	1 Q	3:23.0	2nd place, silver medalist(s)

== Boxing ==
Seven boxers represented South Africa at the 1920 Games. It was the nation's debut in boxing. Walker won the nation's first Olympic boxing medal, a gold in the bantamweight.

Boxer	Weight class	Round of 32	Round of 16	Quarterfinals	Semifinals	Final / Bronze match	
Boxer	Weight class	Opposition Score	Opposition Score	Opposition Score	Opposition Score	Opposition Score	Rank
Richard Beland	Lightweight	N/A	Grégoire (FRA); W	Van Muysen (BEL); W	Mosberg (USA); L	Newton (CAN); L	4
William Bradley	Middleweight	Bye	Hesterman (NED); W	Herscovitch (CAN); L	did not advance		5
Thomas Holdstock	Light heavyweight	N/A	Clementz (NOR); W	Eagan (USA); L	did not advance		5
Roy Ingram	Welterweight	Bye	Stokstad (NOR); L	did not advance			9
Jim MacGregor	Light heavyweight	N/A	Schell (USA); L	did not advance			9
Joseph Thomas	Welterweight	Bye	Schneider (CAN); L	did not advance			9
Clarence Walker	Bantamweight	N/A	Bouwens (BEL); W	Hartman (USA); W	McKenzie (GBR); W	Graham (CAN); W	1st place, gold medalist(s)

Opponent nation	Wins	Losses	Percent
Belgium	2	0	1.000
Canada	1	3	.250
France	1	0	1.000
Great Britain	1	0	1.000
Netherlands	1	0	1.000
Norway	1	1	.500
United States	1	3	.250
Total	8	7	.533

Round	Wins	Losses	Percent
Round of 32	0	0	–
Round of 16	4	3	.571
Quarterfinals	2	2	.500
Semifinals	1	1	.500
Final	1	0	1.000
Bronze match	0	1	.000
Total	8	7	.533

== Cycling ==
Five cyclists represented South Africa in 1920. It was the nation's third appearance in the sport. The South Africans took three medals, including silvers in the tandem (Smith and Walker) and individual time trial (by Kaltenbrun) and a bronze in the team pursuit. The team pursuit medal was awarded due to South Africa having the faster time of the two semifinal losers.

=== Road cycling ===
Cyclist	Event	Final	
Cyclist	Event	Result	Rank
Henry Kaltenbrunn	Time trial	4:41:26.6	2nd place, silver medalist(s)
James Walker	Time trial	did not finish	

=== Track cycling ===
Ranks given are within the heat.

Cyclist	Event	Heats		Quarterfinals		Repechage semis		Repechage final		Semifinals		Final	
Cyclist	Event	Result	Rank	Result	Rank	Result	Rank	Result	Rank	Result	Rank	Result	Rank
Hendrik Goosen	Sprint	Unknown	3	did not advance									
William Smith	Sprint	Unknown	3	did not advance									
William Smith	50 km	N/A										Unknown	7
George Thursfield	Sprint	Unknown	2 Q	13.2	1 Q	Advanced directly				15.2	2	did not advance	
James Walker	Sprint	13.6	1 Q	13.6	1 Q	Advanced directly				15.2	3	did not advance	
James Walker	50 km	N/A										did not finish	
Hendrik Goosen; George Thursfield	Tandem	N/A		Unknown	2	N/A				did not advance			
William Smith; James Walker	Tandem	N/A		13.0	1 Q	N/A				12.6	1 Q	Unknown	2nd place, silver medalist(s)
Hendrik Goosen; Henry Kaltenbrunn; William Smith; James Walker	Team pursuit	N/A		5:21.0	1 Q	N/A				5:17.8	2	Did not advance	3rd place, bronze medalist(s)

== Shooting ==
Seven shooters represented South Africa in 1920. It was the nation's second appearance in the sport. South Africa won its first Olympic shooting medal, with the silver in the long-range team prone military rifle.

Shooter	Event	Final	
Shooter	Event	Result	Rank
Robert Bodley	50 m small-bore rifle	Unknown	
Robert Bodley	300 m free rifle, 3 pos.	Unknown	
George Harvey	50 m small-bore rifle	Unknown	
George Harvey	300 m free rifle, 3 pos.	Unknown	
George Lishman	50 m small-bore rifle	Unknown	
Fred Morgan	50 m small-bore rifle	Unknown	
Fred Morgan	300 m free rifle, 3 pos.	Unknown	
Mark Paxton	50 m small-bore rifle	Unknown	
Mark Paxton	300 m free rifle, 3 pos.	Unknown	
David Smith	300 m free rifle, 3 pos.	Unknown	
Robert Bodley; Ferdinand Buchanan; George Harvey; Fred Morgan; David Smith	600 m team military rifle, prone	287	2nd place, silver medalist(s)
Robert Bodley; Ferdinand Buchanan; George Harvey; Fred Morgan; David Smith	300 & 600 m team military rifle, prone	560	5
Robert Bodley; Ferdinand Buchanan; Fred Morgan; Mark Paxton; David Smith	300 m team military rifle, standing	233	9
Robert Bodley; George Harvey; George Lishman; Fred Morgan; Mark Paxton	50 m team small-bore rifle	1755	8
Robert Bodley; George Harvey; Fred Morgan; Mark Paxton; David Smith	Team free rifle	4292	10
Robert Bodley; George Lishman; Fred Morgan; Mark Paxton; David Smith	300 m team military rifle, prone	276	8

== Tennis ==
Five tennis players, all men, competed for South Africa in 1920. It was the nation's third appearance in the sport. Winslow, the defending gold medalist in the singles, fell to Ichiya Kumagae in the semifinals and finished with the bronze medal. Kumagae had also beaten Dodd in the quarterfinals. Raymond won the other semifinal, however, and then beat Kumagae to take the gold. Both men's doubles pairs lost in the quarterfinals.

Player	Event	Round of 64	Round of 32	Round of 16	Quarterfinals	Semifinals	Finals	Rank
Player	Event	Opposition Score	Opposition Score	Opposition Score	Opposition Score	Opposition Score	Opposition Score	Rank
George Dodd	Men's singles	Blanchy (FRA); W 2–6, 6–2, 6–1, 9–7	Décugis (FRA); W 6–2, 6–1, 6–1	Kashio (JPN); W 6–3, 4–6, 6–2, 3–6, 6–1	Kumagae (JPN); L 7–5, 6–1, 6–1	did not advance		5
Brian Norton	Men's singles	Décugis (FRA); L 6–4, 12–10, 2–6, 8–6	did not advance					32
Louis Raymond	Men's singles	Bye	van den Bemden (BEL); W 7–5, 6–1, 4–6, 6–1	Brugnon (FRA); W 3–6, 6–2, 6–0, 6–1	Malström (SWE); W 6–3, 6–1, 6–1	Turnbull (GBR); W 2–6, 1–6, 6–2, 6–2, 6–1	Kumagae (JPN); W 5–7, 6–4, 7–5, 6–4	1st place, gold medalist(s)
Charles Winslow	Men's singles	Bye	Samazeuilh (FRA); W 7–5, 2–6, 6–3, 6–2	Washer (BEL); W 8–6, 6–4, 6–1	Lowe (GBR); W 6–4, 3–6, 6–4, 3–6, 6–2	Kumagae (JPN); L 6–2, 6–2, 6–2	Turnbull (GBR); W	3rd place, bronze medalist(s)
Cecil Blackbeard; George Dodd	Men's doubles	N/A	Beamish & Lowe (GBR); W 6–1, 10–8, 6–3	Lawton & Samazeuilh (FRA); W 6–3, 6–0, 9–7	Albarran & Décugis (FRA); L 3–6, 6–4, 6–4, 7–5	did not advance		5
Brian Norton; Louis Raymond	Men's doubles	N/A	J. Alonso & M. Alonso (ESP); W 6–3, 7–5, 6–0	Ardelt & Žemla-Rázný (TCH); W 6–1, 6–4, 6–4	Kashio & Kumagae (JPN); L 6–3, 6–2, 4–6, 6–3	did not advance		5

Opponent nation	Wins	Losses	Percent
Belgium	2	0	1.000
Czechoslovakia	1	0	1.000
France	5	2	.714
Great Britain	4	0	1.000
Japan	2	3	.400
Spain	1	0	1.000
Sweden	1	0	1.000
Total	16	5	.762

Round	Wins	Losses	Percent
Round of 64	1	1	.500
Round of 32	5	0	1.000
Round of 16	5	0	1.000
Quarterfinals	2	3	.400
Semifinals	1	1	.500
Final	1	0	1.000
Bronze match	1	0	1.000
Total	16	5	.762

== Wrestling ==
A single wrestler competed for South Africa in 1920. It was the nation's debut in the sport. Hans J.J. van Rensburg was defeated in the quarterfinals of the freestyle light heavyweight.

=== Freestyle ===
Wrestler	Event	Round of 32	Round of 16	Quarterfinals	Semifinals	Finals / Bronze match	Rank
Hans van Rensburg	Light heavyweight	N/A	Snoeck (BEL) (W)	Courant (SUI) (L)	did not advance		5

Opponent nation	Wins	Losses	Percent
Belgium	1	0	1.000
Switzerland	0	1	.000
Total	1	1	.500

Round	Wins	Losses	Percent
Round of 32	0	0	–
Round of 16	1	0	1.000
Quarterfinals	0	1	.000
Semifinals	0	0	–
Final	0	0	–
Bronze match	0	0	–
Total	1	1	.500
