= Spain at the 1920 Summer Olympics =

- IOC code: ESP
- NOC: Spanish Olympic Committee

in Antwerp
- Competitors: 58 in 7 sports
- Flag bearer: José García
- Medals Ranked 17th: Gold 0 Silver 2 Bronze 0 Total 2

Summer Olympics appearances (overview)
- 1900; 1904–1912; 1920; 1924; 1928; 1932; 1936; 1948; 1952; 1956; 1960; 1964; 1968; 1972; 1976; 1980; 1984; 1988; 1992; 1996; 2000; 2004; 2008; 2012; 2016; 2020; 2024

Spain competed at the 1920 Summer Olympics in Antwerp, Belgium. It was only the second appearance of the nation at the Summer Games, after competing in the 1900 Summer Olympics, but missing the Games in 1904, 1908, and 1912. 58 competitors, all men, took part in 29 events in 7 sports.

== Medalists ==
Medal	Name	Sport
Silver	Spain national football team: Domingo Acedo; Patricio Arabolaza; Mariano Arrate; Juan Artola; José Belausteguigoitia; Sabino Bilbao; Ramón Eguiazábal; Ramón Gil; Silverio Izaguirre; Luis Otero; Francisco Pagatzaurtundúa; Rafael Moreno "Pichichi"; Josep Samitier; Agustin Sancho; Félix Sesúmaga; Pedro Vallana; Joaquín Vázquez; Ricardo Zamora	Football
Silver	Marquess of Villabrágima; José de Figueroa; Duke of Peñaranda; Duke of Alba; Count of la Maza	Polo

== Aquatics ==
=== Swimming ===
Two swimmers, both men, represented Spain in 1920. It was the nation's debut in the sport. Neither man advanced past the quarterfinals.

Ranks given are within the heat.

Men

Swimmer	Event	Quarterfinals		Semifinals		Final	
Swimmer	Event	Result	Rank	Result	Rank	Result	Rank
Luis Balcells	200 m breast	Unknown	6	Did not advance			
Luis Balcells	400 m breast	Did not finish		Did not advance			
Joaquín Cuadrada	1500 m free	Unknown	4	Did not advance			

=== Water polo ===
Spain competed in the Olympic water polo tournament for the first time in 1920. The Bergvall System was in use at the time. Spain took advantage of an Italian forfeit in the round of 16 to advance to the quarterfinals, but there met the dominant Great Britain—the British team was on its way to its fourth gold medal in four appearances. Losing to the gold medalist, however, had its advantages under the Bergvall System. Spain got a chance to contest the silver medal. It lost in the silver medal semifinals to the United States, however, and the Americans' loss to Belgium kept Spain from trying for the bronze.

Round of 16

Spain	1–1	Italy	Antwerp

Italy forfeited the match.

Quarterfinals

Great Britain	9–0	Spain	Antwerp

Silver medal semifinals

United States	5–0	Spain	Antwerp

Final rank
7th

== Athletics ==
14 athletes represented Spain in 1920. It was the nation's debut in athletics. Domínguez's 25th-place finish in the cross country was the only time a Spanish athlete competed in, and finished, an event final.

Ranks given are within the heat.

Athlete	Event	Heats		Quarterfinals		Semifinals		Final	
Athlete	Event	Result	Rank	Result	Rank	Result	Rank	Result	Rank
Carlos Botín	100 m	11.6	3	Did not advance					
Jaime Camps	100 m		5	Did not advance					
Julio Domínguez	Cross country	N/A							25
José García Lorenzana	400 m	53.4	4	Did not advance					
Miguel García Onsalo	400 m	52.0	2 Q	52.8	4	Did not advance			
Miguel García Onsalo	800 m	N/A		2:02.2	3 Q	2:01.2	6	Did not advance	
José Grasset	800 m	N/A			7	Did not advance			
Ignacio Izaguirre	Shot put	11.235	17	N/A				Did not advance	
Ignacio Izaguirre	Javelin throw	38.92	23	N/A				Did not advance	
Luis Meléndez	10 km walk	N/A				53:56.6	5 Q	Did not finish	
Félix Mendizábal	100 m	11.2	2 Q	11.1	2 Q		5	Did not advance	
Félix Mendizábal	200 m	23.2	3	Did not advance					
Juan Muguerza	1500 m	N/A				Did not finish		Did not advance	
Juan Muguerza	5000 m	N/A					6	Did not advance	
Diego Ordóñez	100 m		3	Did not advance					
Diego Ordóñez	200 m	23.7	3	Did not advance					
Carlos Pajarón	200 m	24.2	3	Did not advance					
Teodoro Pons	5000 m	N/A				Did not finish		Did not advance	
Teodoro Pons	10000 m	N/A					7	Did not advance	
Federico Reparez	200 m		5	Did not advance					
Félix Mendizábal; Diego Ordóñez; Jaime Camps; Federico Reparez	4 × 100 m relay	N/A				44.6	3	Did not advance	

== Football ==
Spain competed in the Olympic football tournament for the first time. The team compiled a record of 4–1 on the way to a silver medal; the four wins were the most of any team in 1920. A first-round win over Denmark set up a quarterfinal contest against eventual gold-medalists Belgium—Spain's only loss. In the consolation tournament, the Spanish squad won its matches against Sweden and Italy to advance to the silver medal game against the Netherlands, which Spain won.

First round

28 August 1920

Spain	1–0	Denmark
Arabolaza 54'	Report

La Butte, Brussels
Attendance: 3,000
Referee: Willem Eymers (NED)

Quarterfinals

29 August 1920

Belgium	3–1	Spain
Coppée 11' 52' 55'	Report	Arrate 62' (pen.)

Olympisch Stadion, Antwerp
Attendance: 18,000
Referee: Johannes Mutters (NED)

Consolation first round

1 September 1920

Spain	2–1	Sweden
Belauste 51'; Acedo 53'	Report	Dahl 28'

Broodstraat, Antwerp
Attendance: 1,500
Referee: Giovanni Mauro (ITA)

Consolation semifinals

2 September 1920

Spain	2–0	Italy
Sesúmaga 43' 72'	Report

Olympisch Stadion, Antwerp
Attendance: 10,000
Referee: Paul Putz (BEL)

Consolation final

5 September 1920

Spain	3–1	Netherlands
Sesúmaga 7' 35'; Pichichi 72'	Report	Groosjohan 68'

Olympisch Stadion, Antwerp
Attendance: 14,000
Referee: Paul Putz (BEL)

Final rank
(silver) Silver

== Polo ==
Spain competed in the Olympic polo tournament for the first time. The team took the silver medal, beating the United States in the semifinals but losing to Great Britain in the final.

Semifinals

Spain	13–3	United States

Final

Spain	11–13	Great Britain

Final rank
(silver) Silver

== Shooting ==
Seven shooters represented Spain in 1920. It was the nation's debut in the sport. Spain's best result was sixth place, achieved in the team military pistol event.

Shooter	Event	Final	
Shooter	Event	Result	Rank
José Benito López	50 m small-bore rifle	Unknown	
José Benito López	300 m free rifle, 3 pos.	Unknown	
Antonio Bonilla	50 m small-bore rifle	Unknown	
Antonio Bonilla	300 m free rifle, 3 pos.	Unknown	
Luis Calvet	50 m small-bore rifle	Unknown	
Luis Calvet	300 m free rifle, 3 pos.	Unknown	
Antonio Moreira	50 m small-bore rifle	Unknown	
Antonio Moreira	300 m free rifle, 3 pos.	Unknown	
Domingo Rodríguez	50 m small-bore rifle	Unknown	
Domingo Rodríguez	300 m free rifle, 3 pos.	Unknown	
José Benito López; Antonio Bonilla; Luis Calvet; José María Miró; Antonio Vázquez	30 m team military pistol	1224	6
José Benito López; Antonio Bonilla; Luis Calvet; José María Miró; Antonio Vázquez	50 m team free pistol	2010	12
José Benito López; Antonio Bonilla; Luis Calvet; Antônio Moreira; Domingo Rodríguez	50 m team small-bore rifle	1753	9
José Benito López; Antonio Bonilla; Luis Calvet; Antônio Moreira; Domingo Rodríguez	Team free rifle	4080	11
José Benito López; Antonio Bonilla; Luis Calvet; Antônio Moreira; Domingo Rodríguez	300 m team military rifle, prone	278	7
José Benito López; Antonio Bonilla; Luis Calvet; Antônio Moreira; Domingo Rodríguez	300 m team military rifle, standing	200	14
José Benito López; Antonio Bonilla; Luis Calvet; Antônio Moreira; Domingo Rodríguez	600 m team military rifle, prone	253	13
José Benito López; Antonio Bonilla; Luis Calvet; Antônio Moreira; Domingo Rodríguez	300 & 600 m team military rifle, prone	510	12

== Tennis ==
Four tennis players, all men, competed for Spain in 1920. It was the nation's debut in the sport. Manuel Alonso had the most success in the singles, winning three matches to advance to the quarterfinals before being beaten. Fernández de Liencres and de Satrústegui were the better of the two doubles pairs, advancing to the second round.

Player	Event	Round of 64	Round of 32	Round of 16	Quarterfinals	Semifinals	Finals	Rank
Player	Event	Opposition Score	Opposition Score	Opposition Score	Opposition Score	Opposition Score	Opposition Score	Rank
José María Alonso	Men's singles	Kumagae (JPN); L 7–5, 6–3, 6–3	Did not advance					32
Manuel Alonso	Men's singles	Just (TCH); W 6–3, 2–6, 6–0, 6–2	Woosnam (GBR); W 6–1, 2–6, 6–1, 6–3	Beamish (GBR); W 6–1, 5–7, 5–7, 6–3, 6–1	Turnbull (GBR); L 0–6, 7–5, 4–6, 6–3, 7–5	Did not advance		5
Enrique de Satrústegui	Men's singles	Bye	Simon (SUI); L 3–6, 8–6, 6–2, 6–8, 6–2	Did not advance				17
José Miguel Fernández de Liencres	Men's singles	Lindqvist (SWE); W 0–6, 6–2, 6–3, 6–2	Balbi (ITA); L 6–2, 6–4, 6–1	Did not advance				17
José Alonso; Manuel Alonso	Men's doubles	N/A	Norton & Raymond (RSA); L 6–3, 7–5, 6–0	Did not advance				17
Enrique de Satrústegui; J.M. Fernández de Liencres	Men's doubles	N/A	de Laveleye & Halot (SUI); W 7–5, 6–3, 1–6, 6–4	Albarran & Décugis (FRA); L 6–2, 3–6, 6–0, 6–4	Did not advance			9

Opponent nation	Wins	Losses	Percent
Czechoslovakia	1	0	1.000
France	0	1	.000
Great Britain	2	1	.667
Italy	0	1	.000
Japan	0	1	.000
South Africa	0	1	.000
Sweden	1	0	1.000
Switzerland	1	1	.500
Total	5	6	.455

Round	Wins	Losses	Percent
Round of 64	2	1	.667
Round of 32	2	3	.400
Round of 16	1	1	.500
Quarterfinals	0	1	.000
Semifinals	0	0	–
Final	0	0	–
Bronze match	0	0	–
Total	5	6	.455
