= Shooting at the 1920 Summer Olympics – Men's 300 metre military rifle, prone =

Men's 300 metre military rifle, prone events at the Olympics

Men's 300 metre military rifle, prone at the Games of the VII Olympiad
- Venue: Beverloo Camp
- Dates: 29–30 July 1920
- Competitors: 22 from 7 nations

Medalists
1st place, gold medalist(s)		Otto Olsen	Norway
2nd place, silver medalist(s)		Léon Johnson	France
3rd place, bronze medalist(s)		Fritz Kuchen	Switzerland

The 300 metre military rifle, prone was a shooting sports event held as part of the Shooting at the 1920 Summer Olympics programme. It was the fourth appearance for military rifle events and the second time that medals were awarded for the prone position. The first time was the competition in 1900. The competition was held on 29 July 1920 and on 30 July 1920. 22 shooters from seven nations competed.

== Results ==
The maximum score was 60.

Place	Shooter	Total	Shoot-off
1	Otto Olsen (NOR)	60	
2	Léon Johnson (FRA)	59	58
3	Fritz Kuchen (SUI)	59	57
4	Vilho Vauhkonen (FIN)	59	56
5	Achille Paroche (FRA)	59	56
6	Erik Blomqvist (SWE)	58	
6	Mauritz Eriksson (SWE)	58	
6	Hugo Johansson (SWE)	58	
6	Lloyd Spooner (USA)	58	
6	Albert Helgerud (NOR)	58	
6	Olaf Sletten (NOR)	58	
-	Lars Jørgen Madsen (DEN)	57	
-	Ture Holmberg (SWE)	57	
-	Werner Jernström (SWE)	57	
-	Harry Adams (USA)	57	
-	Willis A. Lee (USA)	56	
-	Frederick Hird (USA)	55	
-	Joseph Jackson (USA)	54	
-	Erik Sætter-Lassen (DEN)	unknown	
-	Niels Larsen (DEN)	unknown	
-	Christen Møller (DEN)	unknown	
-	Anders Andersson (DEN)	unknown	
