= Shooting at the 1920 Summer Olympics – Men's 600 metre military rifle, prone =

Men's 600 metre military rifle, prone at the Games of the VII Olympiad
- Venue: Beverloo Camp
- Dates: 29–30 July 1920
- Competitors: 18 from 6 nations

Medalists
| 1st place, gold medalist(s) | | Hugo Johansson | Sweden |
| 2nd place, silver medalist(s) | | Mauritz Eriksson | Sweden |
| 3rd place, bronze medalist(s) | | Lloyd Spooner | United States |

The 600 metre military rifle, prone was a shooting sports event held as part of the Shooting at the 1920 Summer Olympics programme. It was the fourth appearance for military rifle events and the second time that medals were awarded for the prone position. The first time was the competition in 1900. The competition was held on 29 July 1920 and 30 July 1920. 18 shooters from six nations competed.

== Results ==
The maximum score was 60.

| Place | Shooter | Total | Shoot-off |
|---|---|---|---|
| 1 | Hugo Johansson (SWE) | 59 | 58 |
| 2 | Mauritz Eriksson (SWE) | 59 | 56 + 6 |
| 3 | Lloyd Spooner (USA) | 59 | 56 + 5 |
| 4 | Ioannis Theofilakis (GRE) | 59 | 55 |
| 5 | Olaf Sletten (NOR) | 58 | |
| 5 | Erik Blomqvist (SWE) | 58 | |
| 5 | Joseph Jackson (USA) | 58 | |
| 8 | Povl Gerlow (DEN) | 57 | |
| 8 | Erik Ohlsson (SWE) | 57 | |
| 8 | Joseph Lawless (USA) | 57 | |
| - | Magnus Wegelius (FIN) | 56 | |
| - | Otto Wegener (DEN) | 56 | |
| - | Willis A. Lee (USA) | 56 | |
| - | Lars Jørgen Madsen (DEN) | 55 | |
| - | Niels Larsen (DEN) | 55 | |
| - | Christen Møller (DEN) | 55 | |
| - | Gustaf Adolf Jonsson (SWE) | 54 | |
| - | Elmer Lindroth (USA) | 54 | |
