= Ika Peyron =

Swedish musician (1845–1922)

Albertina Fredrika Peyron
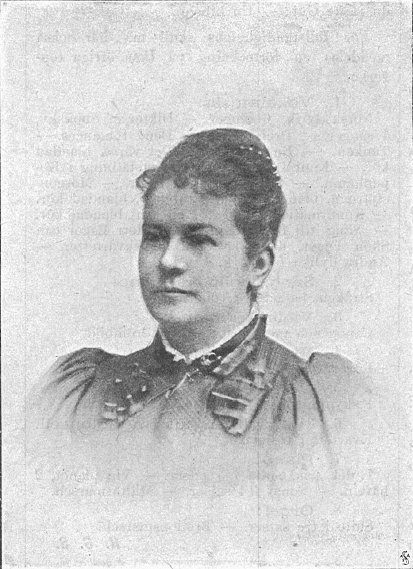
- Born: Albertina Asp; 1 July 1845; Timrå, Västernorrland
- Died: 15 March 1922 (aged 76); Stockholm, Sweden
- Other name: Ika Peyron
- Occupations: Composer, pianist and organist
- Spouse: Ludvig Peyron

Albertina Fredrika "Ika" Peyron, née Asp (1 July 1845 – 15 March 1922) was a Swedish composer, pianist and organist. She wrote songs as well as compositions for violin, piano and solo songs. Some of her pieces are still played, especially compositions for marching bands.

== Life ==
Ika Peyron was born in Timrå, Västernorrland, and was the foster child of the merchant Anton Asp, who wished her to have a profession and gave her a good education. Asp wished for her to become a medical doctor, but she was early on focused on music. She was educated as a pianist in Stockholm and a student of Louise Engström, Ivar Hallström, Johan van Boom, Emil Sjögren and Anton Andersen. She also studied in London. She attempted to compose but gave up because of the poor attitude toward female composers.

In 1865 she married the merchant and politician Ludvig Peyron, and devoted the next decade to raising her sons. In the late 1870s, her sons were no longer small, and the attitude toward female composers had changed. Ika Peyron devoted herself completely to composition from the 1880s, when she tutored as well as directed and performed concerts at the chapels of the theatres and at the Ladies' Society Nya Idun. She published a large number of compositions suited to amateur players at home, and was widely published in Sweden, and her music was popular. Some of her compositions for marching bands are still played today, especially På terrassen, I ungdomstiden, and Festligt intåg.

She died in Stockholm in 1922.

Ivar Hallström dedicated three piano pieces to Peyron.

== Works ==
Peyron's compositions included:

- Chamber music (principally string quartets and works for violin and piano)
- Piano music
- Organ music
- Songs
- Choral works
