= Erik Ohlsson (sport shooter) =

Swedish sport shooter (1884–1980)

Personal information
- Born: 20 November 1884 Malmö, Sweden
- Died: 19 September 1980 (aged 95) Malmö, Sweden

Sport
- Sport: Sports shooting
Medal record
Men's shooting
Representing Sweden
Olympic Games
Silver medal – second place	1920 Antwerp	Team small-bore rifle
Bronze medal – third place	1920 Antwerp	Team 600m

Per Erik F. "Pågen" Ohlsson (20 November 1884 – 19 September 1980) was a Swedish sport shooter who competed in the 1908 Summer Olympics, in the 1912 Summer Olympics, and in the 1920 Summer Olympics.

In 1908 he finished 28th in the 300 metre free rifle competition and 43rd in the 1000 yard free rifle event. Four years later, he finished 21st in the 300 metre military rifle, three positions competition and 28th in the 600 metre free rifle event. In 1920, he won the silver medal as a member of the Swedish team in the team small-bore rifle competition and the bronze medal in the team 600 metre military rifle, prone.

In the 1920 Summer Olympics, he also participated in the following events:

- 600 metre military rifle, prone - eighth place
- 300 metre military rifle, prone - place unknown
- 50 metre small-bore rifle - place unknown
