= Leon Lagerlöf =

Swedish sport shooter

Personal information
- Born: 8 April 1870 Nordmaling, Sweden
- Died: 30 November 1951 (aged 81) Stockholm, Sweden

Sport
- Sport: Sports shooting
Medal record
Men's shooting
Representing Sweden
Olympic Games
Silver medal – second place	1920 Antwerp	Team small-bore rifle
Bronze medal – third place	1920 Antwerp	Team 300 m military rifle, standing

John Leonard "Leon" Lagerlöf (8 April 1870 – 30 November 1951) was a Swedish sport shooter who competed in the 1912 Summer Olympics, in the 1920 Summer Olympics, and in the 1924 Summer Olympics.

In 1912, he finished 29th in the 600 metre free rifle competition.

Eight years later, he won the silver medal as a member of the Swedish team in the team small-bore rifle event and the bronze medal in the team 300 metre military rifle, standing competition. He finished sixth in the team free rifle event. He also participated in the 300 metre free rifle, three positions event and in the 50 metre small-bore rifle competition.

In 1924 he finished twelfth in the 50 metre rifle, prone competition.
