= Erik Sætter-Lassen =

Danish sport shooter (1892–1966)

Personal information
- Nationality: Danmark
- Born: 15 July 1892 Gilleleje, Denmark
- Died: 24 December 1966 (aged 74) Helleruplund, Denmark

Sport
- Country: Denmark
- Sport: Sports shooting
Medal record
Men's shooting
Representing Denmark
Olympic Games
Gold medal – first place	1920 Antwerp	Team military rifle

Erik Sætter-Lassen (15 July 1892 – 24 December 1966) was a Danish sport shooter who competed at the 1920, 1924, 1936 and 1948 Summer Olympics.

== 1920 Antwerp ==
In 1920, he won the gold medal as a member of the Danish team in the team 300 metre military rifle standing event.

In the Summer Olympics, he also participated in the following events:

- 300 metre military rifle, standing - fourth place
- Team 50 metre small-bore rifle - fourth place
- 50 metre small-bore rifle - place unknown
- 300 metre military rifle, prone - result unknown

== 1924 Paris ==
In the 1924 Summer Olympics, he participated in the following events:

- 50 metre rifle, prone - fourth place
- Team free rifle - sixth place
- 600 metre free rifle - 46th place

== 1936 Berlin ==
In 1936, he finished 15th in the 50 metre rifle, prone event and 22nd in the 25 metre rapid fire pistol competition.
