= Erik Blomqvist (sport shooter) =

Swedish sport shooter (1879–1956)

Personal information
- Nationality: Swedish
- Born: 5 January 1879 Stockholm, Sweden
- Died: 17 September 1956 (aged 77) Stockholm, Sweden

Sport
- Country: Sweden
- Sport: Sports shooting
Medal record
Men's shooting
Representing Sweden
Olympic Games
Gold medal – first place	1912 Stockholm	Team free rifle
Bronze medal – third place	1920 Antwerp	Team 600 m military rifle, prone

Erik Gustaf Blomqvist (5 January 1879 – 17 September 1956) was a Swedish sport shooter who competed in the 1912 Summer Olympics and in the 1920 Summer Olympics.

In 1912, he won the gold medal as a member of the Swedish team in the team free rifle competition. He finished tenth in the 300 metre free rifle, three positions event. Eight years later, he won the bronze medal as a member of the Swedish team in the team 600 metre military rifle, prone competition.

In the 1920 Summer Olympics, he also participated in the following events:

- 600 metre military rifle, prone - fifth place
- Team 300 metre military rifle, prone - fifth place
- 300 metre military rifle, prone - sixth place
- Team 300 and 600 metre military rifle, prone - sixth place
- Team free rifle - sixth place
- 300 metre free rifle, three positions - place unknown
