= Jan Brussaard =

Dutch sport shooter (1875–1940)

Personal information
- Born: 30 January 1875 Delfshaven, Netherlands
- Died: 28 December 1940 (aged 65) Rotterdam, Netherlands

Sport
- Sport: Sports shooting

Pieter Johannes "Jan" Brussaard (30 January 1875 – 28 December 1940) was a Dutch sport shooter who competed in the 1908 Summer Olympics and in the 1920 Summer Olympics.

He was born in Delfshaven and died in Rotterdam. He was the father of Jan Hendrik Brussaard. In 1908 he finished seventh with the Dutch team in the team free rifle event. Four years later at the 1920 Summer Olympics he participated in the following events:

- Team free rifle – eighth place
- Team 600 metre military rifle, prone – ninth place
- Team 300 metre military rifle, standing – tenth place
- Team 300 metre military rifle, prone – twelfth place
- Team 300 and 600 metre military rifle, prone – 13th place
- 300 metre free rifle, three positions – place unknown
