= Castromonte =

Municipality and village in Valladolid, Castile and León, Spain

Coordinates: 41°46′N 5°02′W

Castromonte, Spain
- Coat of arms

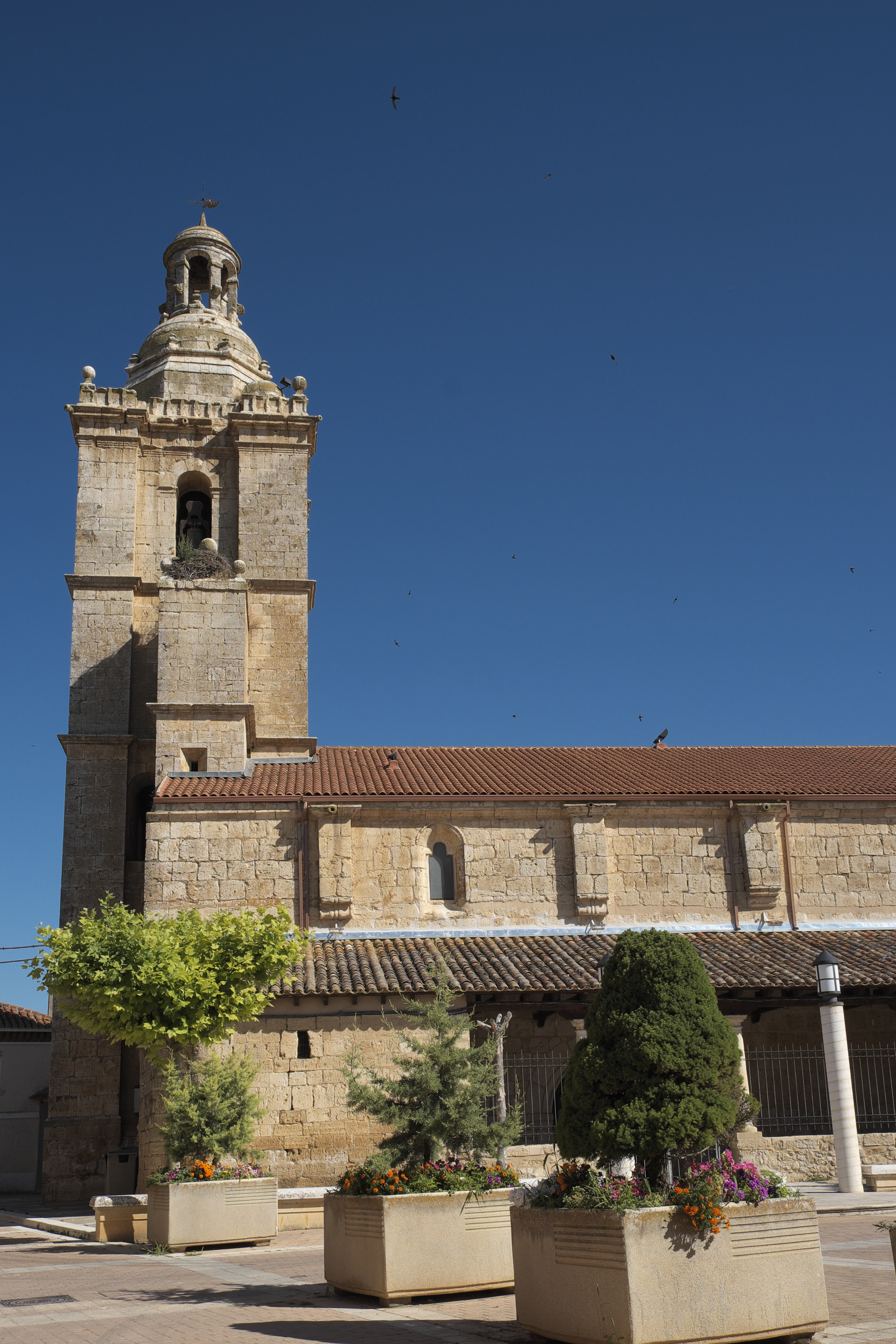
- Church of Inmaculada Concepción
- Country: Spain
- Autonomous community: Castile and León
- Province: Valladolid
- Municipality: Castromonte

Government
  - Major: Helidoro de la Iglesia Bezos (Spanish People's Party)

Area
  - Total: 87 km^{2} (34 sq mi)

Population (2023)
  - Total: 331
  - Density: 3.8/km^{2} (9.9/sq mi)
- Time zone: UTC+1 (CET)
  - Summer (DST): UTC+2 (CEST)

Castromonte is a municipality located in the province of Valladolid, Castile and León, Spain. According to the 2023 census (INE), the municipality has a population of 331 inhabitants. Olympic sports shooter Domingo Rodríguez was born here.

== See also ==
- Cuisine of the province of Valladolid
