= Anders Petersen (sport shooter) =

Danish sport shooter (1876–1968)

Personal information
- Born: 13 July 1876 Vordingborg, Denmark
- Died: 8 December 1968 (aged 92) Glostrup, Denmark

Sport
- Sport: Sports shooting
Medal record
Men's shooting
Representing Denmark
Olympic Games
Gold medal – first place	1920 Antwerp	Team 300 m military rifle, standing

Anders Martinus Petersen (13 July 1876 – 8 December 1968) was a Danish sport shooter who competed in the 1920 Summer Olympics. In 1920 he won the gold medal as member of the Danish team in the team 300 metre military rifle, standing event. In the individual 300 metre military rifle, standing event he finished seventh.
