= Morris Fisher =

American sport shooter

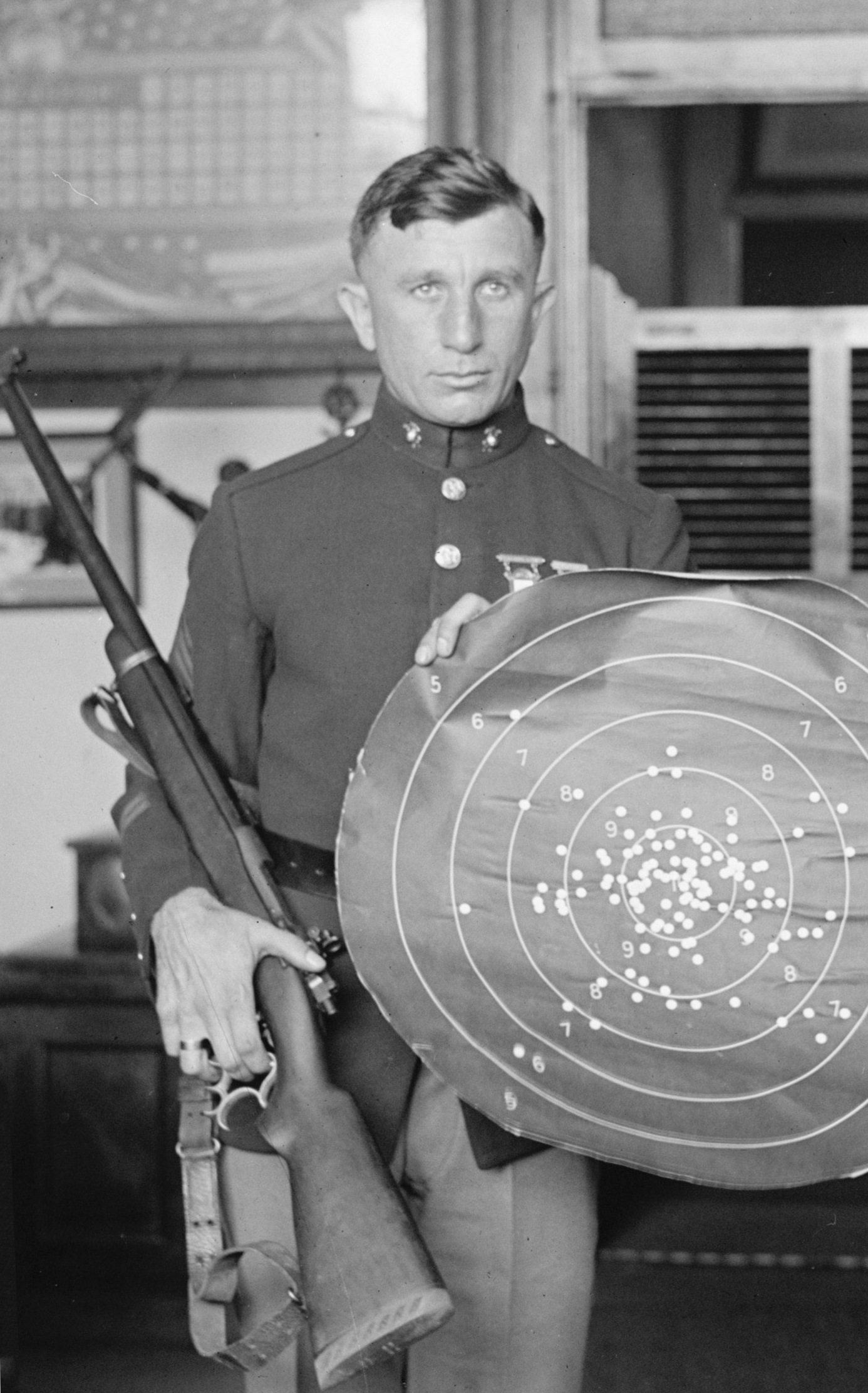
- Morris Fisher in 1923 holding his 300 m rifle and its target

Personal information
- Born: May 4, 1890 Youngstown, Ohio, United States
- Died: May 23, 1968 (aged 78) Honolulu, Hawaii, United States

Sport
- Sport: Sport shooting
- Club: U.S. Marine Corps
Medal record
Representing United States
Olympic Games
Gold medal – first place	1920 Antwerp	300 m free rifle, three positions
Gold medal – first place	1920 Antwerp	Team free rifle
Gold medal – first place	1920 Antwerp	Team 300 m military rifle, prone
Gold medal – first place	1924 Paris	600 metre free rifle
Gold medal – first place	1924 Paris	Team free rifle

Morris "Bud" Fisher (May 4, 1890 – May 23, 1968) was an American sport shooter and United States Marine Corps shooting instructor. He competed at the 1920 and 1924 Summer Olympics and won five gold medals in 300–800 m rifle events. He ended his Olympic career in 1924, as shooting was not part of the 1928 Games, and long-distance rifle events re-appeared only at the 1948 Olympics, when he had long retired both from active competitions and military service.

== Biography ==
Fisher was born in Youngstown, Ohio. In 1911, Fisher enlisted in the United States Marine Corps and later competed while on duty. Besides his Olympic medals, Fisher won six world titles and held five world records. In 1916, he was awarded the distinguished marksman badge. He retired from shooting competitions in 1934 and later coached shooters at the U.S. Marine Corps and at the Toledo police department. In 1941, he retired from military service as a gunnery sergeant. He was soon recalled as a shooting instructor during World War II, in which he lost his son William, at Okinawa in 1945. Fisher retired for good in 1946 as a Chief Warrant Officer.

He settled first in La Jolla, California, and then in Honolulu, Hawaii, where he died in 1968. He was buried with full military honors at Fort Rosecrans National Cemetery in San Diego, California. In 2009, he was inducted into the United States Marine Corps Sports Hall of Fame. He has also been inducted into the USA Shooting Hall of fame.

== Books by Fisher ==
- Mastering the Pistol and Revolver, New York: Putnam's, 1940. [Riling 2314]
- Mastering the Rifle, New York: Putnam's, 1940. [Riling 2315]
