= Bror Andreasson =

Swedish sports shooter

Personal information
- Born: 25 January 1887 Billinge, Sweden
- Died: 15 October 1969 (aged 82) Billinge, Sweden

Sport
- Sport: Sports shooting

Bror Andreasson (25 January 1887 – 15 October 1969) was a Swedish sports shooter. He competed in the 300 and 600 metre team military rifle event at the 1920 Summer Olympics.
