= Dennis Fenton =

American sport shooter (1888–1954)

Personal information
- Born: November 20, 1888 Ventry, Ireland
- Died: March 29, 1954 (aged 65) San Diego, California, United States

Sport
- Sport: Sport shooting
Medal record
Men's shooting
Representing United States
Olympic Games
Gold medal – first place	1920 Antwerp	Team free rifle
Gold medal – first place	1920 Antwerp	Team military rifle, prone
Gold medal – first place	1920 Antwerp	Team small-bore rifle
Bronze medal – third place	1920 Antwerp	Small-bore rifle
Bronze medal – third place	1924 Paris	Team running deer

Dennis Fenton (November 20, 1888 – March 29, 1954) was an American sport shooter and Olympic champion. He was born in Ventry, Ireland, and died in San Diego, California.

In 1920, he won three gold and one bronze medal. He also participated in the 300 metre free rifle, three positions, but his final placing is unknown. Four years later, he won another bronze medal. In the 1924 Summer Olympics he also participated in the following events:

- Team 100 metre running deer, double shots - fifth place
- 100 metre running deer, single shots - twelfth place
- 600 metre free rifle - 24th place
- 100 metre running deer, double shots - 24th place
