= Hugo Johansson =

Swedish sport shooter (1887–1977)

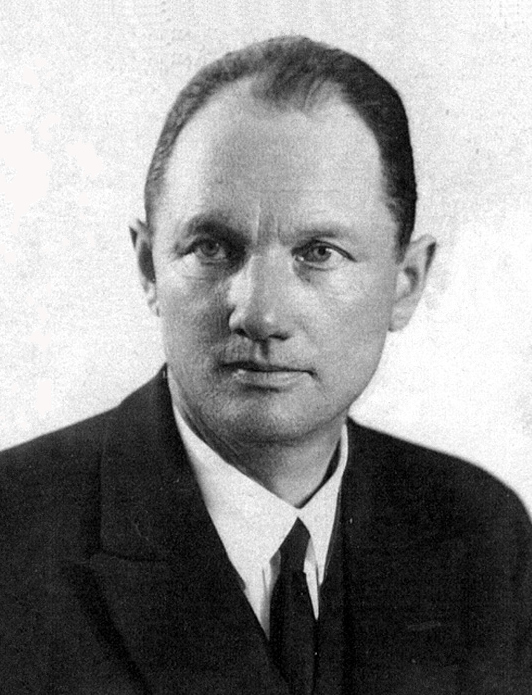

Personal information
- Full name: Carl Hugo Johansson
- Nationality: Swedish
- Born: 16 June 1887 Stockholm, Sweden
- Died: 23 February 1977 (aged 88) Stockholm, Sweden

Sport
- Country: Sweden
- Sport: Sports shooting
- Club: Kungsholms SG, Täby
Medal record
Representing Sweden
Olympic Games
Gold medal – first place	1912 Stockholm	Team free rifle
Gold medal – first place	1920 Antwerp	600 metre military rifle, prone
Bronze medal – third place	1912 Stockholm	Team military rifle
Bronze medal – third place	1920 Antwerp	Team 300 m military rifle, standing
Bronze medal – third place	1920 Antwerp	Team 600 m military rifle, prone

Carl Hugo Johansson (16 June 1887 – 23 February 1977) was a Swedish sport shooter who competed at the 1912, 1920 and 1924 Summer Olympics.

In 1912, he won the gold medal as a member of the Swedish team in the team free rifle event and the bronze medal in the team military rifle competition.

In the 1912 Summer Olympics he also participated in the following events:

- 300 metre free rifle, three positions – fourth place
- 600 metre free rifle – 23rd place

Eight years later, he won the gold medal in the 600 metre military rifle prone event and two bronze medals in military rifle team competitions.

In the 1920 Summer Olympics, he also participated in the following events:

- Team 300 metre military rifle, prone – fifth place
- 300 metre military rifle, prone – sixth place
- Team 300 and 600 metre military rifle, prone – sixth place
- Team free rifle – sixth place
- 300 metre free rifle, three positions – place unknown

In the 1924 Summer Olympics, he participated in the following events:

- Team free rifle – seventh place
- 600 metre free rifle – eighth place
