= Vilho Vauhkonen =

Finnish sport shooter (1877–1957)

Personal information
- Born: 6 February 1877 Pieksämäki, Finland
- Died: 1 February 1957 (aged 79) Helsinki, Finland

Sport
- Sport: Sports shooting
Medal record
Men's shooting
Representing Finland
Olympic Games
Bronze medal – third place	1920 Antwerp	team running deer, double shots
Bronze medal – third place	1920 Antwerp	team 300 m military rifle, prone

Vilhelm "Vilho" Vauhkonen (6 February 1877 – 1 February 1957) was a Finnish sport shooter who competed in the 1912 Summer Olympics and in the 1920 Summer Olympics. He was born in Pieksämäki and died in Helsinki.

In 1912 he finished fifth with the Finnish team in the team free rifle event and 41st in the 300 metre free rifle, three positions competition. Eight years later, he won two bronze medals as a member of the Finnish team in the team running deer, double shots event and in the team 300 metre military rifle, prone competition. In the 1920 Summer Olympics he also participated in the following events:

- 300 metre military rifle, prone – fourth place
- Team free rifle – fourth place
- Team 300 metre military rifle, standing – seventh place
- Team 600 metre military rifle, prone – eighth place
- Team 300 and 600 metre military rifle, prone – tenth place
- 300 metre free rifle, three positions – place unknown
