= Luigi Favretti =

Italian sports shooter

Personal information
- Born: 20 November 1872 Agordo, Italy
- Died: 15 June 1950 (aged 77) Agordo, Italy

Sport
- Sport: Sports shooting

Luigi Favretti (20 November 1872 – 15 June 1950) was an Italian sports shooter. He competed in the 300m team military rifle event at the 1920 Summer Olympics.
