= Mauritz Eriksson =

Swedish sport shooter (1888–1947)

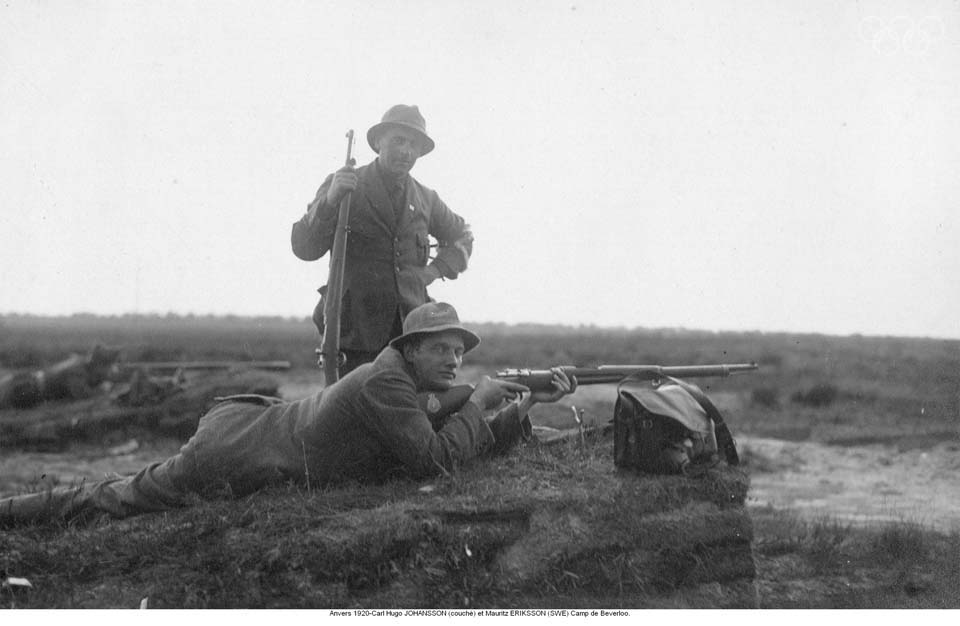
- Eriksson (standing) at the 1920 Summer Olympics

Personal information
- Full name: Axel Mauritz Eriksson
- Nationality: Swedish
- Born: 18 December 1888 Stockholm, Sweden
- Died: 14 February 1947 (aged 58) Stockholm, Sweden

Sport
- Country: Sweden
- Sport: Sports shooting
Medal record
Men's shooting
Representing Sweden
Olympic Games
Gold medal – first place	1912 Stockholm	Team free rifle
Silver medal – second place	1920 Antwerp	600 metre military rifle, prone
Bronze medal – third place	1912 Stockholm	Team military rifle
Bronze medal – third place	1920 Antwerp	Team 300 m military rifle, standing
Bronze medal – third place	1920 Antwerp	Team 600 m military rifle, prone

Axel Mauritz Eriksson (18 December 1888 – 14 February 1947) was a Swedish sport shooter who competed in the 1912 Summer Olympics, in the 1920 Summer Olympics, and in the 1924 Summer Olympics.

In 1912, he won the gold medal as a member of the Swedish team in the team free rifle event and the bronze medal in the team military rifle competition.

In the 1912 Summer Olympics, he also participated in the following events:

- 300 metre free rifle, three positions - 14th place
- 600 metre free rifle - 38th place

Eight years later, he won the silver medal in the 600 metre military rifle prone event and two bronze medals in military rifle team competitions.

In the 1920 Summer Olympics, he also participated in the following events:

- Team 300 metre military rifle, prone - fifth place
- 300 metre military rifle, prone - sixth place
- Team 300 and 600 metre military rifle, prone - sixth place
- Team free rifle - sixth place
- 300 metre free rifle, three positions - seventh place

In the 1924 Summer Olympics, he participated in the following events:

- Team free rifle - seventh place
- 600 metre free rifle - 19th place
- 50 metre rifle, prone - 24th place
