= Walfrid Hellman =

Swedish sport shooter

Personal information
- Born: 17 November 1883 Badelunda, Sweden
- Died: 7 October 1952 (aged 68) Stockholm, Sweden

Sport
- Sport: Sports shooting
Medal record
Men's shooting
Representing Sweden
Olympic Games
Bronze medal – third place	1920 Antwerp	Team 300 m military rifle, standing

Gustaf Walfrid Hellman (17 November 1883 – 7 October 1952) was a Swedish sport shooter who competed in the 1920 Summer Olympics. In 1920, he won the bronze medal as a member of the Swedish team in the team 300 metre military rifle, standing competition.
