= Fritz Kuchen =

Swiss sport shooter (1877–1973)

Personal information
- Born: 10 September 1877
- Died: 26 May 1973 (aged 95) Winterthur, Switzerland

Sport
- Sport: Sports shooting
Medal record
Men's shooting
Representing Switzerland
Olympic Games
Bronze medal – third place	1920 Antwerp	300m military rifle
Bronze medal – third place	1920 Antwerp	team free rifle
Bronze medal – third place	1920 Antwerp	team military rifle

Fritz Kuchen (10 September 1877 – 26 May 1973) was a Swiss sport shooter who competed in the 1920 Summer Olympics.

In 1920, he won a bronze medal in the 300 metre military rifle, prone event, as well as two bronze medals as a member of the Swiss team in the team free rifle competition and in the team 300 and 600 metre military rifle, prone competition. In the 1920 Summer Olympics he also participated in the following events:

- Team 300 metre military rifle, prone – fourth place
- Team 600 metre military rifle, prone – sixth place
- Team 300 metre military rifle, standing – eighth place
- 300 metre free rifle, three positions – place unknown
