= Voitto Kolho =

Finnish sport shooter (1885–1963)

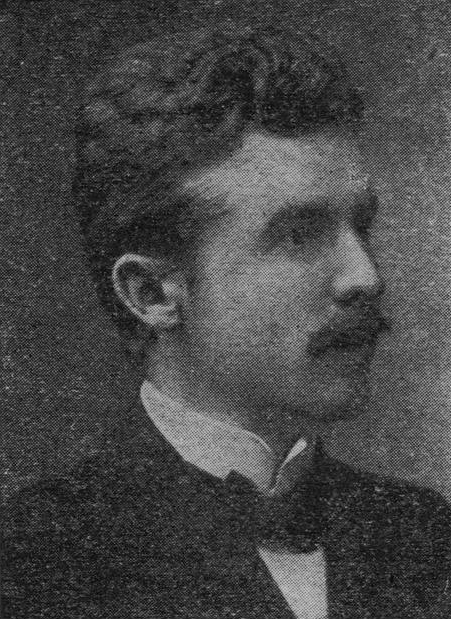

Personal information
- Full name: Voitto Valdemar Kolho
- Nickname: VeeVee
- National team: Finland
- Born: Voitto Valdemar Saxberg; 6 February 1885 Keuruu, Grand Duchy of Finland, Russian Empire
- Died: 4 October 1963 (aged 78) Helsinki, Finland
- Education: Master of Science (Technology), Helsinki University of Technology, 1912
- Occupation(s): Senior engineer, technical director, machine shop engineer, assistant teacher of mechanical engineering
- Spouse: Eira Helena Nylund

Sport
- Sport: Sports shooting
- Club: Ylä-Vuoksen Ampujat; Kolhon Ampuma- ja Metsästysseura; Enson Suojeluskunta
Medal record
Representing Finland
Olympic Games
Bronze medal – third place	1920 Antwerp	300 metre team military rifle, prone

Voitto Valdemar Kolho (born Saxberg, 6 February 1885 – 4 October 1963) was a Finnish sport shooter, who won an Olympic bronze and five Finnish national championships.

== Shooting ==
=== Olympics ===
Voitto Kolho at the Olympic Games
Games	Event	Rank	Notes
1908 Summer Olympics	300 metre free rifle, three positions	17th	Source:
1908 Summer Olympics	300 metre free rifle, team	8th	Source:
1912 Summer Olympics	300 metre free rifle, three positions	13th	
1912 Summer Olympics	Team free rifle	5th	
1920 Summer Olympics	50 metre team free pistol	11th	
1920 Summer Olympics	300 metre free rifle, three positions	7th	
1920 Summer Olympics	Team free rifle	4th	
1920 Summer Olympics	300 metre team military rifle, prone	3rd	
1920 Summer Olympics	600 metre team military rifle, prone	8th	
1920 Summer Olympics	300 metre team military rifle, standing	7th	
1920 Summer Olympics	300 and 600 metre team military rifle, prone	10th	
1924 Summer Olympics	50 metre rifle, prone	18th	
1924 Summer Olympics	Team free rifle	5th	

He was the leader of Finland's shooting team in the 1952 Summer Olympics and a deputy member of the board of the Finnish Olympic Committee in 1957–1960.

=== International ===
Kolho competed at the 1914 and the 1924 ISSF World Shooting Championships.

=== National ===
He won five Finnish national championship golds in shooting:

- 150 metre free rifle, standing: 1919, 1920, 1921
- 150 metre free rifle, three positions: 1920
- center-fire pistol, rapid fire: 1930

He won a shooting competition at the Finnish Winter Games 1919 in Helsinki, the largest shooting competition in Finland yet at the time.

He was a founding member of Finnish Shooting Sport Federation and a member of the board in 1919–1921 and a vice-chairman 1953–1957.

== Other ==
He was born to farmer Abram Evert Kolho and Eulalia Riihimäki. Olympic shooters Lauri and Yrjö Kolho were his brothers, as was architect Vilho Kolho. Born Saxberg, they finnicized the family name to Kolho on 12 May 1906.

He married Eira Helena Nylund (1895–1984). They had four children:

1. Ritva (1929–)
2. Maija-Stiina (1930–)
3. Mauri (1933–1978)
4. Kai (1933–)

He graduated as a Master of Science (Technology) from the Helsinki University of Technology in 1912. He was a senior engineer and a member of the board in the Enso-Gutzeit Oy in 1935–1950. He was awarded an honorary doctorate in technology.

In the municipal elections of 1936 he was elected in Jääski and was a member of the National Coalition Party. He sat until the end of the term, but was not re-elected in 1945.

== Sources ==
- Siukonen, Markku (2001). Urheilukunniamme puolustajat. Suomen olympiaedustajat 1906–2000. Suuri olympiateos (in Finnish). Jyväskylä: Graface. p. 135. ISBN 951-98673-1-7.
