= Veli Nieminen =

Finnish gymnast

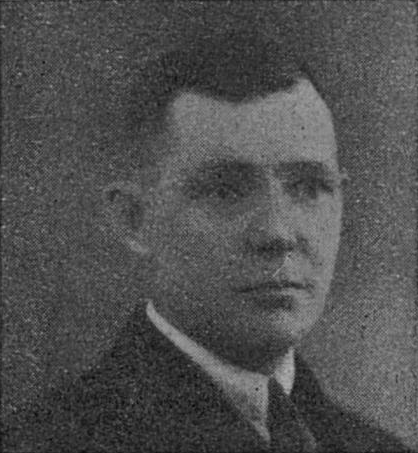

Personal information
- Full name: Heikki Veli Nieminen
- National team: Finland
- Born: 1 December 1886 Tyrväntö, Grand Duchy of Finland, Russian Empire
- Died: 1 April 1936 (aged 49) Hämeenlinna, Finland
- Resting place: Tyrväntö cemetery, Hattula
- Education: Master of Philosophy

Sport
- Sport: Gymnastics; Shooting sports
- Club: Riihimäen ampumaseura; Hämeenlinnan metsästysseura

Gymnastics career
- Discipline: Men's artistic gymnastics
- Country represented: Finland
Medal record
Men's Gymnastics
Representing (Russia) Finland
| Bronze medal – third place | 1908 London | Gymnastics team |
Men's Shooting
Representing Finland
| Bronze medal – third place | 1920 Antwerp | Team 300 m army rifle, prone |

Heikki Veli Nieminen (1 December 1886 – 1 April 1936) was a Finnish gymnast and sports shooter who won two bronzes competing in the 1908, 1920 and 1924 Summer Olympics.

== Sport ==
Veli Nieminen at the Olympic Games
| Games | Sport | Event | Rank | Notes |
|---|---|---|---|---|
| 1908 Summer Olympics | Gymnastics | Team | 3rd | Source: |
| 1920 Summer Olympics | Shooting | Trap | 13th– | Complete results are unavailable, but he was at best 13th |
| 1920 Summer Olympics | Shooting | 300 metre free rifle, three positions | 20th– | Complete results are unavailable, but he was at best 20th |
| 1920 Summer Olympics | Shooting | 300 metre team military rifle, prone | 3rd | |
| 1920 Summer Olympics | Shooting | Team free rifle | 4th | |
| 1920 Summer Olympics | Shooting | 600 metre team military rifle, prone | 8th | |
| 1920 Summer Olympics | Shooting | 300 and 600 metre team military rifle, prone | 10th | |
| 1924 Summer Olympics | Shooting | 600 metre free rifle | 31st | |
| 1924 Summer Olympics | Shooting | Team free rifle | 5th | |

He also participated the ISSF World Shooting Championships twice:

- 1924: free rifle, kneeling: 5th
- 1928: free rifle, prone: 17th

He won the Finnish championship in 150 metre free rifle standing in 1925.

He was the secretary of Finnish Shooting Sport Federation from 1927 to 1936 and a board member from 1919 to 1933.

== Politics ==
He was among the leadership in the Mäntsälä rebellion. He was prosecuted for the rebellion but acquitted.

He was developing the party platform and organisation for the Patriotic People's Movement.

He sat in the Hämeenlinna municipal council in 1934–1936.
