= André Parmentier (sport shooter) =

French sport shooter (1876–1939)

Personal information
- Born: 29 May 1876 Sauveterre-de-Guyenne, France
- Died: 17 September 1969 (aged 93)

Sport
- Sport: Sports shooting
Medal record
Men's shooting
Representing France
Olympic Games
Silver medal – second place	1920 Antwerp	team 300m
Bronze medal – third place	1908 London	team free rifle

André Parmentier (29 May 1876 – 17 September 1939) was a French sport shooter who competed at the 1908 Summer Olympics and at the 1920 Summer Olympics. He was born in Sauveterre de Guyenne, Gironde. In 1908, he was a member of the French team, winning the bronze medal in the team free rifle competition. He also finished fourth with the French team in the team military rifle event. In the 1908 Summer Olympics he also participated in the following events:

- 300 metre free rifle - eighth place
- moving target small-bore rifle - tenth place
- disappearing target small-bore rifle - 21st place

Twelve years later, he won the silver medal as member of the French team in the team 300 metre military rifle, prone competition. In the 1920 Summer Olympics, he also participated in the following events:

- Team 300 and 600 metre military rifle, prone - fourth place
- Team 50 metre small-bore rifle - fifth place
- Team 300 metre military rifle, standing - fifth place
- Team 600 metre military rifle, prone - fifth place
- Team free rifle - seventh place
- 300 metre free rifle, three positions - place unknown
- 50 metre small-bore rifle - result unknown
