= Kalle Lappalainen =

Finnish sport shooter

Personal information
- Born: 30 September 1877 Murtolahti, Finland
- Died: 9 May 1965 (aged 87)

Sport
- Sport: Sports shooting
Medal record
Men's shooting
Representing Finland
Olympic Games
Silver medal – second place	1920 Antwerp	team running deer, single shots
Bronze medal – third place	1920 Antwerp	team 300 m military rifle, prone

Kaarlo "Kalle" Kustaa Lappalainen (30 September 1877 – 9 May 1965) was a Finnish sport shooter who competed in the 1920 Summer Olympics.

In 1920, he won the silver medal as member of the Finnish team in the team running deer, single shots event and the bronze medal in the team 300 metre military rifle, prone competition. In the 1920 Summer Olympics, he also participated in the following events:

- Team free rifle – fourth place
- Team 300 metre military rifle, standing – seventh place
- Team 600 metre military rifle, prone – eighth place
- Team 300 and 600 metre military rifle, prone – tenth place
- 300 metre free rifle, three positions – place unknown
