= Olaf Sletten =

Norwegian sport shooter (1886–1943)

Personal information
- Born: 19 April 1886 Aremark, Norway
- Died: 10 December 1943 (aged 57) Oslo, Aremark

Sport
- Sport: Sports shooting
Medal record
Men's shooting
Representing Norway
Olympic Games
Silver medal – second place	1920 Antwerp	Military rifle, team
Silver medal – second place	1920 Antwerp	Free rifle, team
Bronze medal – third place	1920 Antwerp	50m rifle, team

Olaf Johannessen (19 April 1886 – 10 December 1943) was a Norwegian shooter who competed in the early 20th century in rifle shooting. He won two Olympic silver medals and one bronze medal at the 1920 Summer Olympics in Antwerp.

== Career ==
He was born in Aremark. At the 1920 Summer Olympics he competed in ten shooting events. He won silver medals in the free rifle team event and the 300 and 600 metre military rifle, prone, team event; and a bronze medal in the 50 metre small-bore rifle team event. He finished fourth in the 600 metre military rifle, prone, team event; fifth in the 600 metre military rifle, prone event; and sixth in the 300 metre military rifle, prone, the 300 metre military rifle, prone, team and the 300 metre military rifle, standing, team events. He also competed in the 300 metre free rifle, three positions and the 50 metre small-bore rifle events.

At the 1924 Summer Olympics he finished 26th in the 50 metre rifle, prone event. He died in 1943.
