= Luis Calvet =

Spanish sport shooter

Personal information
- Born: 17 March 1888 Castellón de la Plana, Spain

Sport
- Sport: Sports shooting

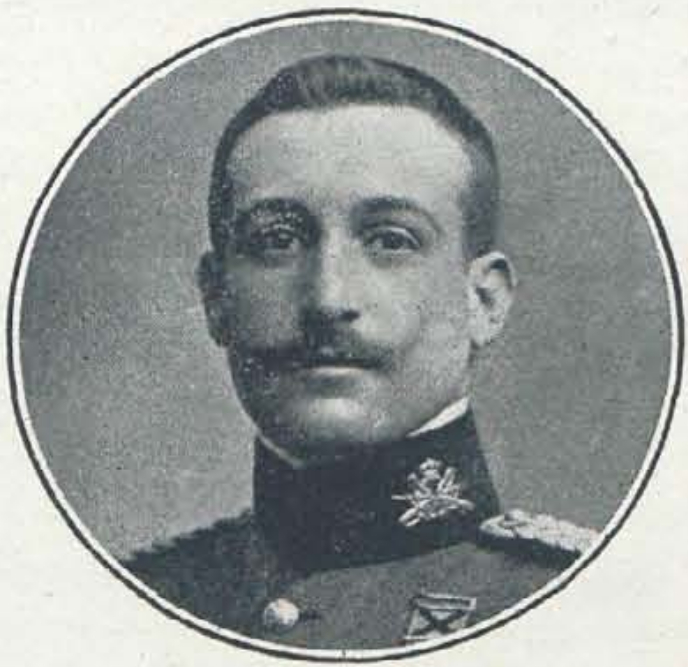
Mr. Luis Calvet, pistol champion.

Luis Calvet Sandoz (17 March 1888 – 7 November 1951) was a Spanish sport shooter who competed in the 1920 Summer Olympics and in the 1932 Summer Olympics.

In the 1920 Summer Olympics he participated in the following events:

- Team 30 metre military pistol – sixth place
- Team 300 metre military rifle, prone – seventh place
- Team 50 metre small-bore rifle – ninth place
- Team free rifle – eleventh place
- Team 50 metre free pistol – twelfth place
- Team 300 and 600 metre military rifle, prone – twelfth place
- Team 600 metre military rifle, prone – 13th place
- Team 300 metre military rifle, standing – 14th place
- 300 metre free rifle, three positions – result unknown
- 50 metre small-bore rifle – result unknown

Twelve years later, at the 1932 Summer Olympics, he finished 13th in the 25 metre rapid fire pistol competition.
