= David Smith (sport shooter) =

South African sport shooter

Personal information
- Born: 10 April 1880 Scotland
- Died: 15 August 1945 (aged 65) Johannesburg, South Africa

Sport
- Sport: Sports shooting
Medal record
Men's shooting
Representing South Africa
Olympic Games
Silver medal – second place	1920 Antwerp	Team 600 m military rifle, prone

David J. Smith (10 April 1880 – 15 August 1945) was a South African sport shooter who competed in the 1920 Summer Olympics and in the 1924 Summer Olympics.

1920 Antwerp

In 1920 he won the silver medal with the South African team in the team 600 metre military rifle, prone competition. In the 1920 Summer Olympics he also participated in the following events:

- Team 300 and 600 metre military rifle, prone - fifth place
- Team 300 metre military rifle, prone - eighth place
- Team 300 metre military rifle, standing - ninth place
- Team free rifle - tenth place
- 300 metre free rifle, three positions - result unknown

1924 Paris

In the 1924 Summer Olympics he participated in the following events:

- Team free rifle - ninth place
- 600 metre free rifle - 59th place
