= Ulrich Fahrner =

Swiss sports shooter

Sport
- Sport: Sports shooting
Medal record
Men's shooting
Representing Switzerland
Olympic Games
| Bronze medal – third place | 1920 Antwerp | Team military rifle |

Ulrich Fahrner was a Swiss sports shooter. He competed in two events at the 1920 Summer Olympics winning a bronze medal in the team military rifle.
