= Bolehošť =

- Municipality
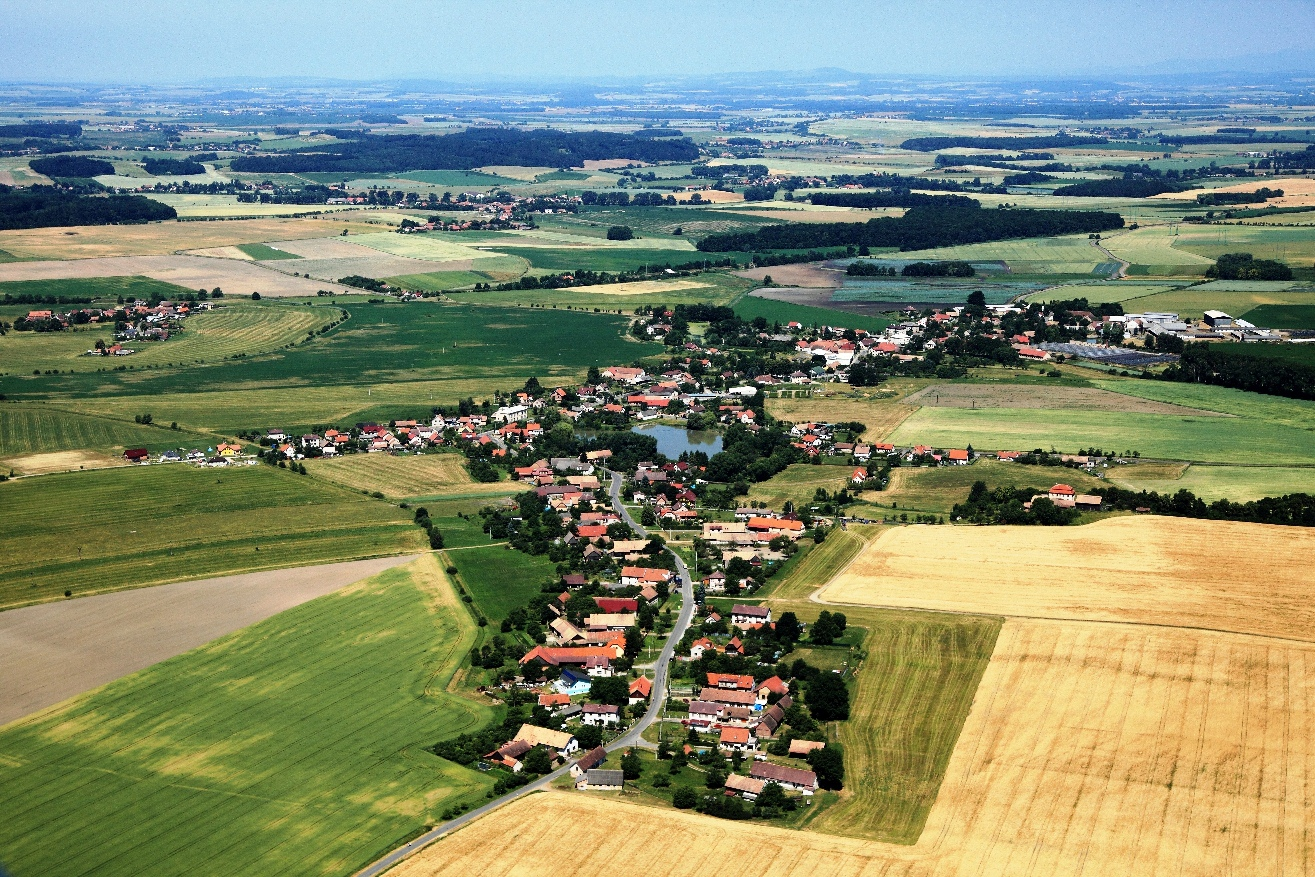
- Aerial view

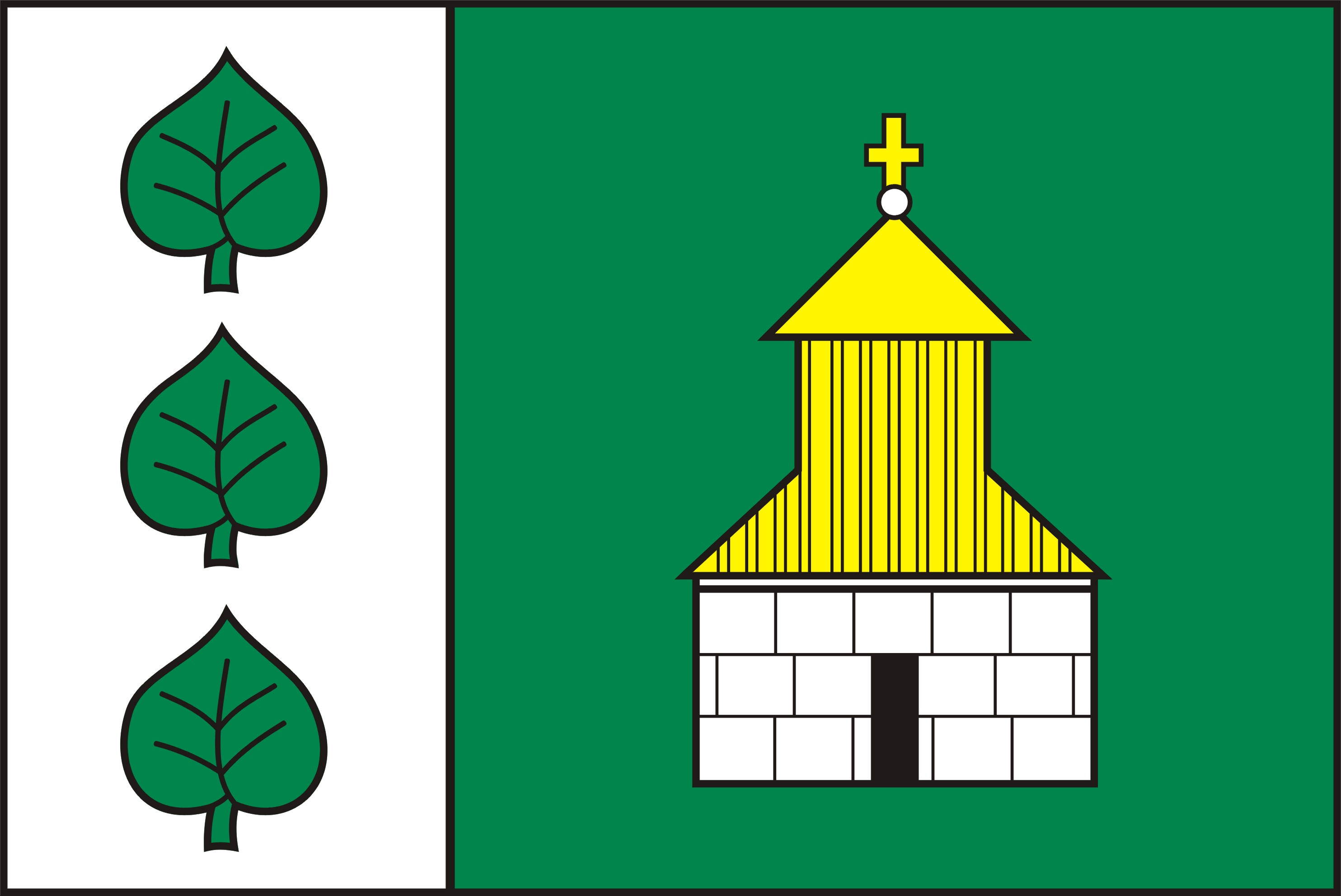
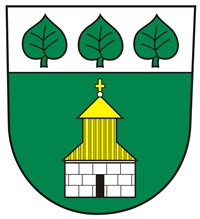
- Flag Coat of arms

- Location in the Czech Republic
- Coordinates: 50°12′49″N 16°4′37″E
- Country: Czech Republic
- Region: Hradec Králové
- District: Rychnov nad Kněžnou
- First mentioned: 1394

Area
  - Total: 10.71 km^{2} (4.14 sq mi)
- Elevation: 261 m (856 ft)

Population (2026-01-01)
  - Total: 665
  - Density: 62.1/km^{2} (161/sq mi)
- Time zone: UTC+1 (CET)
  - Summer (DST): UTC+2 (CEST)
- Postal codes: 517 31
- Website: www.obecbolehost.cz

Bolehošť is a municipality and village in Rychnov nad Kněžnou District in the Hradec Králové Region of the Czech Republic. It has about 700 inhabitants.

== Administrative division ==
Bolehošť consists of three municipal parts (in brackets population according to the 2021 census):

- Bolehošť (381)
- Bolehošťská Lhota (120)
- Lipiny (96)

== Demographics ==
Historical population
Year	Pop.	±%
1869	1,010	—
1880	1,076	+6.5%
1890	1,038	−3.5%
1900	1,019	−1.8%
1910	1,006	−1.3%
1921	1,012	+0.6%
1930	945	−6.6%
1950	762	−19.4%
1961	722	−5.2%
1970	670	−7.2%
1980	634	−5.4%
1991	565	−10.9%
2001	529	−6.4%
2011	529	+0.0%
2021	597	+12.9%
Source: Censuses
