= Robert Bodley =

South African sport shooter (1878–1956)

Personal information
- Born: 31 July 1878 Cape Town, Cape Colony
- Died: 6 November 1956 (aged 78) Port Shepstone, South Africa

Sport
- Sport: Sports shooting
Medal record
Men's shooting
Representing South Africa
Olympic Games
Silver medal – second place	1920 Antwerp	Team 600 m military rifle, prone

Robert Bodley (31 July 1878 – 6 November 1956) was a South African sport shooter who competed in the 1912 Summer Olympics and in the 1920 Summer Olympics.

1912 Stockholm

In the 1912 Summer Olympics, he participated in the following events:

- Team military rifle – fourth place
- Team free rifle – sixth place
- 300 metre military rifle, three positions – 45th place
- 600 metre free rifle – 54th place
- 300 metre free rifle, three positions – 55th place

1920 Antwerp

Eight years later, he won the silver medal with the South African team in the team 600 metre military rifle, prone competition.

In the 1920 Summer Olympics, he also participated in the following events:

- Team 300 and 600 metre military rifle, prone – fifth place
- Team 50 metre small-bore rifle – eighth place
- Team 300 metre military rifle, prone – eighth place
- Team 300 metre military rifle, standing – ninth place
- Team free rifle – tenth place
- 300 metre free rifle, three positions – result unknown
- 50 metre small-bore rifle – result unknown
