= Fred Morgan (sport shooter) =

South African sport shooter

Personal information
- Full name: Fred Hilton Morgan
- Born: 30 June 1893 Johannesburg, South African Republic
- Died: 29 July 1980 (aged 87) Bulawayo, Zimbabwe

Sport
- Sport: Sports shooting
Medal record
Men's shooting
Representing South Africa
Olympic Games
| Silver medal – second place | 1920 Antwerp | Team 600 m military rifle, prone |

Fred Hilton Morgan (30 June 1893 – 29 July 1980) was a South African sport shooter who competed in the 1920 Summer Olympics.

In 1920, he won the silver medal with the South African team in the team 600 metre military rifle, prone competition. He also participated in the following events:

- Team 300 and 600 metre military rifle, prone - fifth place
- Team 300 metre military rifle, standing - ninth place
- Team 300 metre military rifle, prone - eighth place
- Team 50 metre small-bore rifle - eighth place
- Team free rifle - tenth place
- 50 metre small-bore rifle - result unknown
- 300 metre free rifle, three positions - result unknown
