= George Harvey (sport shooter) =

South African sport shooter (1878–1960)

Personal information
- Born: 9 January 1878 Gloucestershire, England
- Died: 3 October 1959 (aged 81) Alicedale, South Africa

Sport
- Sport: Sports shooting
Medal record
Men's shooting
Representing South Africa
Olympic Games
Silver medal – second place	1920 Antwerp	Team 600 m military rifle, prone

George Henry Harvey (9 January 1878 – 3 October 1959) was a South African sport shooter who competed in the 1912 Summer Olympics and in the 1920 Summer Olympics.

1912 Stockholm

In the 1912 Summer Olympics, he participated in the following events:

- Team military rifle – fourth place
- Team free rifle – sixth place
- 300 metre military rifle, three positions – tenth place
- 600 metre free rifle – 21st place
- 300 metre free rifle, three positions – 40th place

1920 Antwerp

Eight years later, he won the silver medal with the South African team in the team 600 metre military rifle, prone competition.

In the 1920 Summer Olympics, he also participated in the following events:

- Team 300 and 600 metre military rifle, prone – fifth place
- Team 50 metre small-bore rifle – eighth place
- Team free rifle – tenth place
- 300 metre free rifle, three positions – result unknown
- 50 metre small-bore rifle – result unknown
