= Ollie Schriver =

American sport shooter

Personal information
- Born: December 17, 1879 Washington, District of Columbia, United States
- Died: June 28, 1947 (aged 67) Washington, District of Columbia, United States

Sport
- Sport: Sport shooting
Medal record
Men's shooting
Representing United States
Olympic Games
Gold medal – first place	1920 Antwerp	Team 600 m military rifle, prone
Gold medal – first place	1920 Antwerp	Team 300+600 m military rifle, prone
Gold medal – first place	1920 Antwerp	Team small-bore rifle

Oliver Martin Schriver (December 17, 1879 – June 28, 1947) was an American gunnery sergeant, sport shooter, and Olympic champion.

He won three gold medals at the 1920 Summer Olympics in Antwerp.

He was born in Washington, D. C., and also died there.
