= Ferdinand Buchanan =

South African sport shooter

Personal information
- Born: 8 March 1888 Swaziland
- Died: 14 April 1967 (aged 79) Pretoria, South Africa

Sport
- Sport: Sports shooting
Medal record
Men's shooting
Representing South Africa
Olympic Games
Silver medal – second place	1920 Antwerp	Team 600 m military rifle, prone

Ferdinand Buchanan
- Military career
- Allegiance: South Africa
- Branch: South African Army
- Rank: Brigadier-General
- Commands: 9th Infantry Brigade; 2nd Infantry Brigade
- Conflicts: World War I World War II: East Africa Campaign
- Awards: Military Cross

Ferdinand Lindley Augustus Buchanan MC (8 March 1888 – 14 April 1967) was a South African sport shooter who competed in the 1920 Summer Olympics. He also was a general in the South African Army who served in both World War I and World War II.

In 1920 he won the silver medal with the South African team in the team 600 metre military rifle, prone competition. He also participated in the following events:

- Team 300 and 600 metre military rifle, prone – fifth place
- Team 300 metre military rifle, standing – ninth place
