= José García (sprinter) =

Spanish sprinter

Personal information
- Nationality: Spanish
- Born: José García Lorenzana; 28 May 1900

Sport
- Sport: Sprinting
- Event: 400 metres

José García Lorenzana (born 28 May 1900, date of death unknown) was a Spanish sprinter. He competed in the men's 400 metres at the 1920 Summer Olympics and was the flag bearer for Spain.
