= Antonio Bonilla =

Spanish sport shooter

Personal information
- Born: 6 December 1882 Guadalajara, Spain
- Died: 9 November 1937 (aged 54) Madrid, Spain

Sport
- Sport: Sports shooting

Antonio Bonilla Sanmartín (6 December 1882 – 9 November 1937) was a Spanish sport shooter who competed in the 1920 Summer Olympics. He was killed in action during the Spanish Civil War.

In the 1920 Summer Olympics he participated in the following events:

- Team 30 metre military pistol – sixth place
- Team 300 metre military rifle, prone – seventh place
- Team 50 metre small-bore rifle – ninth place
- Team free rifle – eleventh place
- Team 50 metre free pistol – twelfth place
- Team 300 and 600 metre military rifle, prone – twelfth place
- Team 600 metre military rifle, prone – 13th place
- Team 300 metre military rifle, standing – 14th place
- 300 metre free rifle, three positions – result unknown
- 50 metre small-bore rifle – result unknown
