= Vincent Libert =

Belgian sports shooter

Sport
- Sport: Sports shooting

Vincent Libert was a Belgian sports shooter. He competed in two events at the 1920 Summer Olympics.
