= Albert Regnier =

French sports shooter (1872–1925)

Personal information
- Born: 18 February 1872 Rouen, France
- Died: 1925 (aged 52–53)

Sport
- Sport: Sports shooting

Albert Louis Marie Regnier (18 February 1872 – 1925) was a French sports shooter. He competed in two events at the 1920 Summer Olympics.
