= Ture Holmberg =

Swedish sports shooter

Personal information
- Born: 4 November 1886 Lund, Sweden
- Died: 7 April 1954 (aged 67) Stockholm, Sweden

Sport
- Sport: Sports shooting

Ture Holmberg (4 November 1886 – 7 April 1954) was a Swedish sports shooter. He competed in two events at the 1920 Summer Olympics.
