= Lloyd Spooner =

American sport shooter

Personal information
- Born: October 6, 1884 Tacoma, Washington, United States
- Died: December 20, 1966 (aged 82) Zephyrhills, Florida, United States

Sport
- Sport: Sports shooting
Medal record
Men's shooting
Representing the United States
Olympic Games
Gold medal – first place	1920 Antwerp	300 m team military rifle, prone
Gold medal – first place	1920 Antwerp	600 m team military rifle, prone
Gold medal – first place	1920 Antwerp	300 and 600 m team military rifle, prone
Gold medal – first place	1920 Antwerp	Team free rifle
Silver medal – second place	1920 Antwerp	300 m team military rifle, standing
Bronze medal – third place	1920 Antwerp	600 m military rifle, prone
Bronze medal – third place	1920 Antwerp	100 m team running deer, single shots

Lloyd Spencer Spooner (October 6, 1884 – December 20, 1966) was an American sports shooter and Olympic champion.

He won four gold medals, one silver medal and two bronze medals at the 1920 Summer Olympics in Antwerp. Six of his seven medals were in team competitions, and the one individual bronze medal was obtained in the Military Rifle, Prone, 600m.

He was born in Tacoma, Washington and died in Zephyrhills, Florida.

== See also ==
- List of multiple Olympic gold medalists at a single Games
