= Jacob Onsrud =

Norwegian sport shooter (1882–1971)

Personal information
- Born: 23 February 1882 Vestre Toten Municipality, Norway
- Died: 4 November 1971 (aged 89) Østre Toten Municipality, Norway

Sport
- Sport: Sports shooting
Medal record
Men's shooting
Representing Norway
Olympic Games
Silver medal – second place	1920 Antwerp	Team military rifle

Jacob Onsrud (23 February 1882 – 4 November 1971) was a Norwegian rifle shooter competing in the early 20th century. He won an Olympic silver medal at the 1920 Summer Olympics in Antwerp for team, military rifle, 300 + 600 m.
