= Joseph Janssens =

Belgian sports shooter

Sport
- Sport: Sports shooting

Joseph Janssens was a Belgian sports shooter. He competed in three events at the 1920 Summer Olympics.
