= Viktor Knutsson =

Swedish sports shooter

Personal information
- Born: 4 January 1886 Örnsköldsvik, Sweden
- Died: 21 January 1969 (aged 83) Stockholm, Sweden

Sport
- Sport: Sports shooting

Viktor Knutsson (4 January 1886 – 21 January 1969) was a Swedish sports shooter. He competed at the 1920 Summer Olympics and the 1924 Summer Olympics.
