= Sem De Ranieri =

Italian sports shooter

Personal information
- Born: 4 June 1888 Viareggio, Italy
- Died: 13 February 1979 (aged 90) Viareggio

Sport
- Sport: Sports shooting

Sem De Ranieri (4 June 1888 – 13 February 1979) was an Italian sports shooter. He competed at the 1920 Summer Olympics and the 1924 Summer Olympics.
