= Louis Ryskens =

Belgian sports shooter

Sport
- Sport: Sports shooting

Louis Ryskens was a Belgian sports shooter. He competed in two events at the 1920 Summer Olympics.
