= Albert Tröndle =

Swiss sports shooter

Personal information
- Born: 28 February 1886

Sport
- Sport: Sports shooting

Albert Tröndle (born 28 February 1886, date of death unknown) was a Swiss sports shooter. He competed at the 1920 Summer Olympics and the 1924 Summer Olympics.
