= George Lishman =

South African sports shooter

George Seath Lishman
Personal information
- Born: 1885
- Died: 14 August 1940 (aged 54–55)

Sport
- Sport: Sports shooting

George Lishman (1885 – 14 August 1940) was a South African sports shooter. He competed in three events at the 1920 Summer Olympics.
