= Christen Møller =

Danish sports shooter (1884–1981)

Personal information
- Born: 17 March 1884 Aalborg, Denmark
- Died: 12 February 1981 (aged 96) Copenhagen, Denmark

Sport
- Sport: Sports shooting

Christen Møller (17 March 1884 – 12 February 1981) was a Danish sports shooter. He competed at the 1920 Summer Olympics and the 1936 Summer Olympics.
