= Peter Petersen (sport shooter) =

Danish sports shooter (1892–1964)

Personal information
- Born: 5 May 1892 Vejen, Denmark
- Died: 27 August 1964 (aged 72) Varde, Denmark

Sport
- Sport: Sports shooting

Peter Petersen (5 May 1892 – 27 August 1964) was a Danish sports shooter. He competed at the 1920 Summer Olympics and the 1924 Summer Olympics.
