= Arnold Rösli =

Swiss sports shooter

Personal information
- Born: 7 August 1879

Sport
- Sport: Sports shooting

Arnold Rösli (born 7 August 1879, date of death unknown) was a Swiss sports shooter. He competed at the 1920 Summer Olympics and the 1924 Summer Olympics.
