= Franco Micheli =

Italian sports shooter

Sport
- Sport: Sports shooting

Franco Micheli was an Italian sports shooter. He competed in three events at the 1920 Summer Olympics. He also competed at the 1906 Intercalated Games.
