= Dario Canas =

Portuguese sports shooter

Personal information
- Born: 29 February 1884 Grande Lisboa, Portugal
- Died: 3 June 1966 (aged 82) São Jorge de Arroios, Portugal

Sport
- Sport: Sports shooting

Dario Canas (29 February 1884 – 3 June 1966) was a Portuguese sports shooter. He competed at the 1920 Summer Olympics and the 1924 Summer Olympics.
