= Arthur Balbaert =

Belgian sports shooter

Personal information
- Born: 27 May 1879 Roubaix, France
- Died: 14 October 1938 (aged 59) Hoevenen, Belgium

Sport
- Sport: Sports shooting

Arthur Balbaert (27 May 1879 – 14 October 1938) was a Belgian sports shooter who competed at the 1920 Summer Olympics and the 1924 Summer Olympics.
