= Andreas Vikhos =

Greek sports shooter

Personal information
- Nationality: Greek
- Born: 1877
- Died: January 1949 (aged 71–72) Athens, Greece

Sport
- Country: Greece
- Sport: Sports shooting

Andreas Vikhos (1877 – January 1949) was a Greek sports shooter. He competed at the 1920 Summer Olympics and the 1924 Summer Olympics.
