= Hermínio Rebelo =

Portuguese sports shooter

Personal information
- Born: 14 April 1883
- Died: 29 August 1962 (aged 79)

Sport
- Sport: Sports shooting

Hermínio Rebelo (14 April 1883 – 29 August 1962) was a Portuguese sports shooter. He competed in five events at the 1920 Summer Olympics.
