= António dos Santos (sport shooter) =

Portuguese sports shooter (1876–?)

Personal information
- Born: 24 April 1888
- Died: 14 January 1968 (aged 79)

Sport
- Sport: Sports shooting

António dos Santos (24 April 1888 – 14 January 1968) was a Portuguese sports shooter. He competed in five events at the 1920 Summer Olympics.
