= Émile Rumeau =

French sport shooter

Personal information
- Born: 23 December 1878 Port Said, Egypt
- Died: 8 July 1943 (aged 64)

Sport
- Sport: Sports shooting
Medal record
Men's shooting
Representing France
Olympic Games
Silver medal – second place	1920 Antwerp	Team military rifle
Silver medal – second place	1924 Paris	Team free rifle

Émile Rumeau (23 December 1878 – 8 July 1943) was a French sport shooter. He was born in Port Said. He won silver medals at the 1920 Summer Olympics and at the 1924 Summer Olympics.
