= Joseph Haesaerts =

Belgian sports shooter

Sport
- Sport: Sports shooting

Philippe Joseph Haesaerts (7 April 1877 - 19 September 1944) was a Belgian sports shooter. He competed in four events at the 1920 Summer Olympics.
