= Anton Andersen =

Danish sports shooter (1880–1971)

Personal information
- Born: 7 September 1880 Holstebro, Denmark
- Died: 13 October 1971 (aged 91) Holstebro, Denmark

Sport
- Sport: Sports shooting

Anton Kristian Andersen (7 September 1880 – 13 October 1971) was a Danish sports shooter. He competed in four events at the 1920 Summer Olympics.
