= Camillo Isnardi =

Italian sports shooter

Personal information
- Born: 17 September 1874 Turin, Italy
- Died: 17 January 1949 (aged 74)

Sport
- Sport: Sports shooting

Camillo Isnardi (17 September 1874 – 17 January 1949) was an Italian sports shooter. He competed at the 1920 Summer Olympics and the 1924 Summer Olympics.
