= Otto Olsen (sport shooter) =

Norwegian sport shooter (1884–1953)

Personal information
- Born: 13 December 1884 Oslo, Norway
- Died: 13 January 1953 (aged 68) Oslo, Norway

Sport
- Sport: Sports shooting
Medal record
Men's shooting
Representing Norway
Olympic Games
Gold medal – first place	1920 Antwerp	Team running deer, single shot
Gold medal – first place	1920 Antwerp	Running deer, single shot
Gold medal – first place	1920 Antwerp	300 m military rifle, prone
Gold medal – first place	1924 Paris	Team running deer, single shot
Silver medal – second place	1920 Antwerp	Team free rifle
Silver medal – second place	1920 Antwerp	Team military rifle, prone, 300 + 600 m
Silver medal – second place	1924 Paris	Team running deer, double shot
Bronze medal – third place	1924 Paris	Running deer, single shot

Otto Martin Olsen (13 December 1884 – 12 July 1953) was a Norwegian rifle shooter who competed in the early 20th century. He won eight Olympic medals, including four gold medals. He became the third shooter to win two Olympic individual gold medals and is one of five athletes to have done so at one Olympics.

== See also ==
- List of multiple Olympic gold medalists
- List of multiple Summer Olympic medalists
