= António Ferreira (sport shooter) =

Portuguese sports shooter

Personal information
- Born: 1886
- Died: 1941 (aged 54–55)

Sport
- Sport: Sports shooting

António Soares de Andréa Ferreira (1886 – 1941) was a Portuguese sports shooter. He competed at the 1920 Summer Olympics and the 1924 Summer Olympics.
