= Gerard van den Bergh =

Dutch sports shooter (1882–1949)

Personal information
- Full name: Gerard Anne van den Bergh
- Born: 19 November 1882 The Hague, Netherlands
- Died: 22 October 1949 (aged 66) The Hague, Netherlands
- Parent: Solko van den Bergh (father)

Sport
- Country: Netherlands
- Sport: Sports shooting
- Club: Oranje Nassau, The Hague
Medal record
Men's shooting
Representing Netherlands
Summer Olympics
Winner	1900 Paris	200m rifle (Note: Achievement recognized by NOC*NSF, but is unofficial according to the IOC.)
World Championships
Second place	1911 Rome	300m rifle prone
Third place	1912 Biarritz	300 m free rifle 3 positions team

Gerard Anne van den Bergh (19 November 1882 – 22 October 1949) was a Dutch sports shooter and shooting sport administrator. He was a member of shooting club Oranje Nassau from The Hague. He had an international career of over two decades, then transitioned into a career as sport shooting administrator.

He won during the 1900 Summer Olympics in Paris the boys 200 meter rifle event. This achievement is recognized by the Dutch Olympic Committee, but he is not recognized by the IOC as an official Olympic champion; which is as of 2024 still under discussion.

He won the silver medal at the World Shooting Championships at the 1911 World Championships and the bronze medal at the 1912 World Championships. He competed at a range of international other tournaments, including the 1908 Summer Olympics and the 1920 Summer Olympics.

He became during his career multiple times national champion and national shooting master.

After the former international governing shooting body was discontinued in 1916, he was the co-founder of the Union Internationale de Tir (nowadays called International Shooting Sport Federation) after World War I.

He held multiple shooting administration functions, including the president of the Royal Association of Dutch Marksmen (nowadays called Royal Dutch Shooting Sport Association) where he has been credited for his impact in the shooting sport. He is credited for the success and organizing the shooting tournament during the 1928 Summer Olympics where shooting was not included, and is regarded as a main moment in the 50-year history of the Royal Dutch Shooting Federation. After the tournament a successful proposal was sent for re-inclusion of shooting at the 1932 Summer Olympics.

== Shooting career ==
Van den Bergh trained at the Dutch national shooting facility Ockenburgh in Loosduinen. He was described as a skilled rifleman. Described by Het Vaderland in 1911, he trained with “praiseworthy diligence”.

=== International career ===
Van den Bergh was at the 1900 Summer Olympics the winner of the boys 200 meter rifle event and is recognized by the Dutch Olympic Committee as an Olympic gold medalist. However, the event is not considered official by the IOC. Like Van den Bergh, there is an ongoing debate about four other Dutch sportspeople, if they can be considered an Olympic champion by the IOC. Proposals to gain recognition for these athletes including Van den Bergh are as of 2024 ongoing, with two Dutch cyclists receiving this recognition in 2024. In 2023 NOC*NSF paid attention to the achievement of Van den Bergh.

At the 1908 Summer Olympics in London, van den Bergh competed in three events – the 50 yard pistol event, 50 yard team pistol event and 300 metre free rifle for teams event. His best ranking was sixth in the 50 yard team event. The early results at the Games were disappointing; it was explained this was because there was every now and then a strong wind blowing over the shooting venue which the Dutch team was not familiar with. With the Dutch team, he became seventh in the free rifle 300 m three positions event, where he was the best of his team with 751 points.

Van den Bergh was a member of the national team for the 1909 World Championships in Hamburg, Germany. He scored standing 280 points and laying 332 points. He was selected as substitute for Dutch team for the 1910 World Shooting Championships in Loosduinen and competed in the practice match. In 1911, via a national competition at Ockenbugh, Van den Burgh was selected for the 1911 World Championships in Rome, Italy. At these World Championships he won the silver medal in the 300 metre military rifle prone event. He finished 5th in the rifle competition, and sixth in the pistol competition. The next year he won the bronze medal in the 300 metre free rifle 3 positions team event at the 1912 World Championships in Biarritz, France.

At the 1920 Summer Olympics in Antwerp he took part in eight events. His best ranking was eighth place in the 300 metre free rifle event.

He did not compete at the 1925 World Championships and retired from international shooting.

=== Main national achievements ===
In July 1908, ahead of the 1908 Summer Olympics, he won a main national competition in the 300 metres event. In June 1909 he competed with his club for the Jochems Cup, where Van den Bergh was the best lying shooter. In August 1909 he became the Dutch master sniper shooter at Ockenburgh. Van den Bergh was not able to win a medal at the 1911 national championships. In 1912 he was one of the main shooter at the General van Merlen competition in Haarlem that lasted 1.5 months. In July 1913 he became with Oranje-Nassau for the third time in a row Dutch national champion. Later that month, he was main prize winner of the Dutch annual match over 200 metres. In August 1913 he became the Dutch master pistol shooter at Ockenburgh. In May 1914 he won, with his club Oranje-Nassau, the Hague-Rotterdam Cup.

== Shooting administration ==
Van den Berg, as well as being a shooter, was also active as a shooting administrator at the national Dutch shooting associations. As of January 1914 he was secretary treasurer of the Neederlandsche Pistool en Revolververeeniging. In April 1916 Van den Berg became a member of the newly formed technical committee of the Koninklijke Vereeniging van Scherpschutters (Royal Shooting Association), and became the Dutch delegate to the Union Internationale de Tir.

After the international shooting federation was dissolved in 1916, Van den Bergh was one of the founders of the Union Internationale de Tir (nowadays called International Shooting Sport Federation).

After being vice-president, Van den Bergh became in 1921 president of the Royal Association of Dutch Marksmen. He was also president of the shooting association Oranje-Nassau. He is credited for being a good leader and organizer. It has been said that he had “all good qualities” of his father who was before a beloved and honored president. An example, Van den Berg is credited for the successful shooting tournament that he organized next to the 1928 Summer Olympics in Amsterdam where shooting was not included and is regarded as a main moment in the 50-year history of the Royal Dutch Shooting Federation. For this tournament the neglected shooting facility Ockenbugh had to be renovated. A few days after the tournament it was urged to include shooting again at the Olympics at the congres of the Union Internationale de Tir. It was decided to propose at the 27th IOC meeting in 1929 inclusion of shooting at the 1932 Olympics what eventually happened.

In 1924 and following years he also served as the team leader of the Dutch national shooting team at Olympic Games and World Championships.

Due to his busy schedule and moving abroad, he resigned from his president position of Oranje-Nassau in 1928 and of the Royal Dutch Shooting association in 1929. He was subsequently appointed honorary chairman of the Oranje-Nassau and honorary member of the Royal Dutch Shooting association. His resignation was regretted by the Dutch association as well as by foreign administrators of shooting associations.

After resigning as president, he remained a member of the international committee and team leader of the Dutch shooting team at Olympic Games and World Championships until the 1939 World Championships, the last world shooting championships before World War II.

== Personal life and death ==
Van den Bergh was born on 19 November 1882 in The Hague. He was the son of Solko van den Bergh, who won a bronze medal at the 1900 Summer Olympics. Gerard van den Berg married Theodora Stelzl in 1913. He was secretary of Grovestins Stichting (Grovestins Foundation) from 1917 until his death. He died on 22 October 1949 in The Hague at the age of 66 years old, survived by his wife and daughter.
