= Joseph Jackson (sport shooter) =

American sport shooter

Personal information
- Born: September 23, 1880 St. Louis, Missouri, United States
- Died: December 30, 1960 (aged 80)

Sport
- Sport: Sport shooting
Medal record
Men's shooting
Representing United States
Olympic Games
Gold medal – first place	1920 Antwerp	Military rifle, prone, teams, 300m
Gold medal – first place	1920 Antwerp	Military rifle, prone, teams, 600m
Gold medal – first place	1920 Antwerp	Military rifle, prone, teams, 300+600m

Joseph Jackson (September 23, 1880 – December 30, 1960) was an American sport shooter and Olympic champion. He was born in St. Louis, Missouri. He won three gold medals, all in team events, at the 1920 Summer Olympics in Antwerp.
