= Konstantinos Kefalas =

Greek sports shooter

Personal information
- Born: 1890
- Died: Unknown

Sport
- Sport: Sports shooting

Konstantinos Kefalas (born 1890, date of death unknown) was a Greek sports shooter. He competed in six events at the 1920 Summer Olympics.
