= Peppy Campus =

Italian sports shooter

Personal information
- Born: 12 January 1869
- Died: Unknown

Sport
- Sport: Sports shooting

Peppy Campus (born 12 January 1869, date of death unknown) was an Italian sports shooter. He competed in five events at the 1920 Summer Olympics.
