= Rudolf Jelen =

Czech sport shooter

Personal information
- Born: 27 January 1876 Bolehošť, Bohemia, Austria-Hungary
- Died: 10 March 1938 (aged 62)

Sport
- Country: Czechoslovakia
- Sport: Sport shooting

Rudolf Jelen (27 January 1876 – 10 March 1938) was a Czech sport shooter. He competed for Czechoslovakia at the 1920 Summer Olympics and the 1924 Summer Olympics.
