= Mark Paxton =

South African sports shooter

Personal information
- Born: 12 May 1875 Fort Beaufort, Cape Colony
- Died: August 17, 1948 (aged 73)

Sport
- Sport: Sports shooting

Mark Paxton (12 May 1875 – 17 August 1948) was a South African sports shooter. He competed in five events at the 1920 Summer Olympics.
