= Václav Kindl =

Czech sport shooter

Personal information
- Born: 1882 Prague, Bohemia, Austria Hungary

Sport
- Sport: Sport shooting

Václav Kindl (1882–?) was a Czech sport shooter. He competed in six events at the 1920 Summer Olympics.
