= Østen Østensen =

Norwegian sport shooter (1878–1939)

Personal information
- Born: 12 August 1878 Drammen, Norway
- Died: 22 December 1939 (aged 61) Oslo, Norway

Sport
- Sport: Sports shooting
Medal record
Men's shooting
Representing Norway
Olympic Games
Silver medal – second place	1912 Stockholm	Team free rifle
Silver medal – second place	1920 Antwerp	Team military rifle
Silver medal – second place	1920 Antwerp	Team free rifle
Bronze medal – third place	1920 Antwerp	Free rifle, three positions
Bronze medal – third place	1920 Antwerp	Team, small bore rifle

Østen Østensen (12 August 1878 – 22 December 1939) was a Norwegian rifle shooter competing in the early 20th century. He won three Olympic silver medals and two bronze medals. His first medal was a silver medal in team, free rifle at the 1912 Summer Olympics in Stockholm. At the 1920 Summer Olympics in Antwerp, he won silver medals for team, free rifle and team, military rifle, 300 + 600 m, and bronze medals in free rifle, three positions, and team, small bore rifle.
