= Herman Bouwens =

Dutch sports shooter

Personal information
- Born: 29 October 1868 Velden, Limburg, Netherlands
- Died: 22 July 1955 (aged 86) Rijswijk, Netherlands

Sport
- Sport: Sports shooting

Herman Bouwens (29 October 1868 – 22 July 1955) was a Dutch sports shooter. He competed in eight events at the 1920 Summer Olympics.
