= Georges Roes =

French sport shooter

Personal information
- Born: 3 March 1889 Tarbes, France
- Died: 14 May 1945 (aged 56) Levallois-Perret, France

Sport
- Sport: Sports shooting
Medal record
Men's shooting
Representing France
Olympic Games
Silver medal – second place	1920 Antwerp	Team military rifle
Silver medal – second place	1924 Paris	Team free rifle

Georges Charles Roes (3 March 1889 – 14 May 1945) was a French sport shooter. He was born in Tarbes. He won silver medals at the 1920 Summer Olympics and at the 1924 Summer Olympics.
