= Cornelis van Dalen =

Dutch sports shooter (1885–1953)

Personal information
- Born: 14 March 1885 Monster, South Holland, Netherlands
- Died: 22 May 1953 (aged 68) Vlaardingen, Netherlands

Sport
- Sport: Sports shooting

Cornelis Marinus van Dalen (14 March 1885 – 22 May 1953) was a Dutch sports shooter. He competed in six events at the 1920 Summer Olympics.
