= Raffaele Frasca =

Italian sports shooter

Personal information
- Born: Naples, Italy

Sport
- Sport: Sports shooting

Raffaele Frasca was an Italian sports shooter. He competed in eight events at the 1920 Summer Olympics.
