= Antonín Brych =

Czech sport shooter

Sport
- Country: Czechoslovakia
- Sport: Sport shooting

Antonín Brych was a Czech sport shooter. He competed for Czechoslovakia in six events at the 1920 Summer Olympics.
