= Josef Sucharda =

Czech sport shooter

Personal information
- Born: 18 April 1883 Řeheč, Bohemia, Austria Hungary
- Died: 19 January 1963 (aged 79) Prachatice, Czechoslovakia

Sport
- Sport: Sport shooting

Josef Sucharda (18 April 1883 – 19 January 1963) was a Czech sport shooter. He competed at the 1920 Summer Olympics and the 1924 Summer Olympics.
