= Josef Linert =

Czech sport shooter

Sport
- Sport: Sports shooting

Josef Linert was a Czech sport shooter. He competed in five events at the 1920 Summer Olympics.
