= Ricardo Ticchi =

Italian sports shooter

Personal information
- Born: 1871
- Died: Unknown

Sport
- Sport: Sports shooting

Ricardo Ticchi (born 1871, date of death unknown) was an Italian sports shooter. He competed at the 1920 Summer Olympics and 1924 Summer Olympics.
