= José Bento =

Spanish sports shooter

Personal information
- Born: 23 April 1882 Placetas, Cuba
- Died: 5 October 1969 (aged 87) Madrid, Spain

Sport
- Sport: Sports shooting

José Bento (23 April 1882 – 5 October 1969) was a Spanish sports shooter. He competed in nine events at the 1920 Summer Olympics.
