= Domingo Rodríguez =

Spanish sports shooter

Personal information
- Born: 4 August 1885 Castromonte, Spain
- Died: 11 March 1968 (aged 82)

Sport
- Sport: Sports shooting

Domingo Rodríguez (4 August 1885 – 11 March 1968) was a Spanish sports shooter. He competed in seven events at the 1920 Summer Olympics.
