= Antonio Moreira =

Spanish sports shooter

Personal information
- Born: 20 January 1897
- Died: 28 January 1937 (aged 40)

Sport
- Sport: Sports shooting

Antonio Moreira (20 January 1897 – 28 January 1937) was a Spanish sports shooter. He competed in seven events at the 1920 Summer Olympics.
