= Water polo at the 1920 Summer Olympics – Men's team squads =

The following is the list of squads that took part in the men's water polo tournament at the 1920 Summer Olympics.

== Belgium ==
The following players represented Belgium:

- Albert Durant
- Paul Gailly
- Pierre Nijs
- Joseph Pletinckx
- Maurice Blitz
- René Bauwens
- Gérard Blitz
- Pierre Dewin

== Brazil ==
The following players represented Brazil:

- Orlando Amêndola
- Agostinho Sampaio de Sá
- Victorino Ramos Fernandes
- Ângelo Gammaro
- João Jório
- Alcides Paiva
- Abrahão Saliture
- Edgard Leite

== Czechoslovakia ==
The following players represented Czechoslovakia:

- František Franěk
- Antonín Novotný
- Václav Lancinger
- Eduard Stibor
- Hugo Sedláček
- Emil Cirl
- František Černík
- Jan Hora

== France ==
The following players represented France:

- Jean Thorailler
- Émile-Georges Drigny
- Albert Mayaud
- Henri Padou
- Henri Duvanel
- Marcel Hussaud
- Paul Vasseur

== Great Britain ==
The following players represented Great Britain:

- Charles Smith
- Noel Purcell
- Chris Jones
- Charles Bugbee
- Billy Dean
- Paul Radmilovic
- Bill Peacock

== Greece ==
The following players represented Greece:

- Pantelis Psychas
- Andreas Asimakopoulos
- Georgios Pilavakhis
- Konstantinos Nikolopoulos
- Mikes Tsamis
- Aristidis Rousias
- Savvas Mavridis
- Dionysios Vasilopoulos
- Nikolaos Baltatzis-Mavrokordatos

== Italy ==
The following players represented Italy:

- Salvatore Cabella
- Ercole Boero
- Amilcare Beretta
- Luigi Burlando
- Achille Olivari
- Umberto Lungavia
- Mario Boero
- Angelo Vassallo

== Netherlands ==
The following players represented the Netherlands:

- Karel Struijs
- Karel Kratz
- Karel Meijer
- George Cortlever
- Piet Plantinga
- Gé Bohlander
- Jean van Silfhout
- Piet van der Velden
- Leen Hoogendijk

== Spain ==
The following players represented Spain:

- Luis Gibert
- Alfonso Tusell
- Ramón Berdomás
- Manuel Armanqué
- Antonio Vila-Coro
- Francisco Gibert
- Enrique Granados
- José Fontanet

== Sweden ==
The following players represented Sweden:

- Theodor Nauman
- Pontus Hanson
- Max Gumpel
- Torsten Kumfeldt
- Vilhelm Andersson
- Nils Backlund
- Robert Andersson
- Erik Andersson
- Harald Julin
- Erik Bergqvist

== Switzerland ==
The following players represented Switzerland:

- Albert Mondet
- Charles Biefer
- Charles Horn
- Henri Demiéville
- Jean Jenni
- Armand Boppart
- René Ricolfi-Doria

== United States ==
The following players represented the United States:

- Preston Steiger
- Sophus Jensen
- Mike McDermott
- Clement Browne
- Herb Vollmer
- Harry Hebner
- James Carson
- William Vosburgh
- Herbert Taylor
- Perry McGillivray
- Duke Kahanamoku
- Norman Ross
