= Brazil at the 1920 Summer Olympics =

- IOC code: BRA
- NOC: Brazilian Olympic Committee

in Antwerp
- Competitors: 19 in 5 sports
- Flag bearer: Guilherme Paraense
- Medals Ranked 15th: Gold 1 Silver 1 Bronze 1 Total 3

Summer Olympics appearances (overview)
- 1920; 1924; 1928; 1932; 1936; 1948; 1952; 1956; 1960; 1964; 1968; 1972; 1976; 1980; 1984; 1988; 1992; 1996; 2000; 2004; 2008; 2012; 2016; 2020; 2024

Brazil competed at the modern Olympic Games for the first time at the 1920 Summer Olympics in Antwerp, Belgium. 19 competitors, all men, took part in 10 events in 5 sports.

Brazil won its first ever Olympic medals in Antwerp. All the three medals came in Shooting events. The five shooters had great difficulty getting to the Antwerp. First, the shooters boarded the Curvello steamship with the rest of the Brazilian delegation, but they had to go down in Portugal when they learned that the ship would not arrive in time for the competition. Then they took a train from Lisbon to Paris, and much of the trip was in an open car, with the athletes being exposed to rain and sun. In Paris, they changed trains, heading for Belgium. But in Brussels, where they expected the connection to Antwerp, some of the weapons and ammunition had been stolen. The athletes had 200 caliber 8 bullets, although they needed at least 75 for each. They made friends with the American athletes Alfred Lane and Raymond Bracken, who gave the Brazilians 2,000 cartridges and 50 targets.

On August 2, Brazil had already started the men's 50 metre team free pistol, with Fernando Soledade. As his weapon was very bad, the head of the American shooting team, Colonel Snyders, lent the Brazilians two weapons manufactured by Colt especially for the competition. The shooters Sebastião Wolf, Dario Barbosa, Guilherme Paraense and Afrânio da Costa exchanged the weapons among themselves and won the bronze medal for men's 50 metre team free pistol. The individual event was simultaneous with the team event, so Afrânio da Costa also got the individual silver medal, in men's 50 metre free pistol, the first individual medal ever won by a Brazilian .

The next day, Guilherme Paraense, a Lieutenant of the Army, became the first ever gold medalist from Brazil, when he won the 30 metre military pistol event.

== Medalists ==
Medal	Name	Sport	Event	Date
Gold	Guilherme Paraense	Shooting	Men's 30 metre military pistol	August 3
Silver	Afrânio da Costa	Shooting	Men's 50 metre free pistol	August 2
Bronze	Afrânio da Costa; Sebastião Wolf; Dario Barbosa; Fernando Soledade; Guilherme Paraense	Shooting	Men's 50 metre team free pistol	August 2

Medals by sport
Sport	1st place, gold medalist(s)	2nd place, silver medalist(s)	3rd place, bronze medalist(s)	Total
Shooting	1	1	1	3
Total	1	1	1	3

Medals by gender
Gender	1st place, gold medalist(s)	2nd place, silver medalist(s)	3rd place, bronze medalist(s)	Total
Male	1	1	1	3
Female	0	0	0	0
Mixed	0	0	0	0
Total	1	1	1	3

=== Multiple medallists ===
The following competitors won several medals at the 1920 Olympic Games.

Name	Medal	Sport	Event
Guilherme Paraense	Gold; Bronze	Shooting	Men's 30 metre military pistol Men's 50 metre team free pistol
Afrânio da Costa	Silver; Bronze	Shooting	Men's 50 metre free pistol Men's 50 metre team free pistol

== Diving ==
A single diver represented Brazil in the nation's Olympic debut in 1920. Wellisch competed in all three of the men's events, reaching the final in two but winning no medals.

Men

Ranks given are within the semifinal group.

Diver	Event	Semifinals			Final		
Diver	Event	Points	Score	Rank	Points	Score	Rank
Adolfo Wellisch	3 m springboard	19	522.85	4	did not advance		
Adolfo Wellisch	10 m platform	Skipped			29	423.80	7
Adolfo Wellisch	Plain high dive	14	162.3	3 Q	37	153.0	8

== Rowing ==
Five rowers represented Brazil in 1920. It was the nation's debut in the sport. Brazil sent one boat, in the coxed fours. It was unable to advance past the semifinals, taking second place to the United States in the three-boat heat. Ranks given are within the heat.

Men

Rower	Event	Quarterfinals		Semifinals		Final	
Rower	Event	Result	Rank	Result	Rank	Result	Rank
Guilherme Lorena; João Jório; Alcides Veira; Abrahão Saliture; Ernesto Flores Filho	Coxed four	N/A		7:25.4	2	did not advance	

== Shooting ==
Five shooters represented Brazil in 1920. It was the nation's debut in the sport as well as the Olympics. All three of Brazil's medals at the Antwerp Games came in shooting events, with one of each type.

Men

Shooter	Event	Final	
Shooter	Event	Result	Rank
Dario Barbosa	50 m free pistol	441	23
Afrânio da Costa	50 m free pistol	489	2nd place, silver medalist(s)
Guilherme Paraense	30 m military pistol	274	1st place, gold medalist(s)
Guilherme Paraense	50 m free pistol	456	13
Fernando Soledade	50 m free pistol	424	26
Sebastião Wolf	50 m free pistol	454	15
Demerval Peixoto; Mário Maurity; Guilherme Paraense; Fernando Soledade; Sebastião Wolf	30 m team military pistol	1261	4
Dario Barbosa; Afrânio da Costa; Guilherme Paraense; Fernando Soledade; Sebastião Wolf	50 m team free pistol	2264	3rd place, bronze medalist(s)

== Swimming ==
Two swimmers, both male, represented Brazil in 1920. It was the nation's debut in the sport as well as the Olympics. Neither swimmer advanced past the quarterfinals.

Men

Swimmer	Event	Quarterfinals		Semifinals		Final	
Swimmer	Event	Result	Rank	Result	Rank	Result	Rank
Orlando Amêndola	100 m freestyle	Unknown	6	did not advance			
Ângelo Gammaro	100 m freestyle	1:22.0	3	did not advance			

== Water polo ==
Brazil competed in the Olympic water polo tournament for the first time in 1920. A modified version of the Bergvall System was in use at the time. Brazil won its first match, against France, before being defeated by Sweden in the quarterfinals.

Round of 16

Brazil	5–1	France	Antwerp

Quarterfinals

Sweden	7–3	Brazil	Antwerp

Roster

Final rank: 6th

- Orlando Amêndola
- Victorino Fernandes
- Ângelo Gammaro
- João Jório
- Edgard Leite
- Mangangá
- Alcides Paiva
- Abrahão Saliture
