= Czechoslovakia at the 1920 Summer Olympics =

- IOC code: TCH
- NOC: Czechoslovak Olympic Committee

in Antwerp
- Competitors: 121 in 13 sports
- Flag bearer: Ladislav Žemla
- Medals Ranked 21st: Gold 0 Silver 0 Bronze 2 Total 2

Summer Olympics appearances (overview)
- 1920; 1924; 1928; 1932; 1936; 1948; 1952; 1956; 1960; 1964; 1968; 1972; 1976; 1980; 1984; 1988; 1992

Other related appearances
- Bohemia (1900–1912); Czech Republic (1994–pres.); Slovakia (1994–pres.)

Czechoslovakia competed at the 1920 Summer Olympics in Antwerp, Belgium. It was the first time that the nation had competed at the Summer Olympic Games, after the republic was founded in 1918. Previously, Bohemia had competed at the Olympic Games from 1900 to 1912.

== Medalists ==
Medal	Name	Sport	Event	Date
Bronze	Karel Hartmann; Vilém Loos; Jan Palouš; Jan Peka; Karel Pešek; Josef Šroubek; Otakar Vindyš; Karel Wälzer	Ice hockey	Men's	April 29
Bronze	Milada Skrbková; Ladislav Žemla	Tennis	Mixed doubles	August 24

== Aquatics ==
=== Swimming ===
Four swimmers, all male, represented Czechoslovakia in 1920. It was the nation's debut in the sport as well as the Olympics. None of the swimmers were able to advance to the finals.

Ranks given are within the heat.

Men

Swimmer	Event	Quarterfinals		Semifinals		Final	
Swimmer	Event	Result	Rank	Result	Rank	Result	Rank
Václav Bucháček	100 m free	1:19.2	2 Q	Unknown	5	Did not advance	
Alois Hrášek	400 m free	Unknown	4	Did not advance			
Alois Hrášek	1500 m free	Unknown	5	Did not advance			
Emanuel Prüll	1500 m free	Unknown	5	Did not advance			
Eduard Stibor	200 m breast	Unknown	5	Did not advance			
Eduard Stibor	400 m breast	Unknown	5	Did not advance			

=== Water polo ===
Czechoslovakia competed in the Olympic water polo tournament for the first time in 1920. A modified version of the Bergvall System was in use at the time. The team was shut out in both of its games, first by Sweden in the round of 16 and then by the Netherlands in the bronze medal quarterfinals.

- Squad

- Frantšek Franěk
- Antonín Novotný
- Václav Lancinger
- Eduard Stibor

- Hugo Sedláček
- Emil Cirl
- František Černík
- Jan Hora

Round of 16

Sweden	11–0	Czechoslovakia	Antwerp

Bronze medal quarterfinals

Netherlands	7–0	Czechoslovakia	Antwerp

Final rank
11th

== Athletics ==
16 athletes represented Czechoslovakia in the country's Olympics debut in 1920. The best result for the team was Vohralík's 4th-place finish in the 1500 metres, just 1.6 seconds behind the bronze medal winner.

Ranks given are within the heat.

Athlete	Event	Heats		Quarterfinals		Semifinals		Final	
Athlete	Event	Result	Rank	Result	Rank	Result	Rank	Result	Rank
Karel Frankenstein	400 m	52.5	3	Did not advance					
Karel Frankenstein	800 m	—N/a			6	Did not advance			
Eduard Hašek	100 m		4	Did not advance					
František Kiehlmann	400 m hurdles	—N/a		59.9	3 Q	Did not advance			
František Marek	110 m hurdles	—N/a			4	Did not advance			
František Marek	400 m hurdles	—N/a			4	Did not advance			
Karel Pacák	5000 m	—N/a					8	Did not advance	
Karel Pacák	10000 m	—N/a					11	Did not advance	
Vojtěch Plzák	100 m		4	Did not advance					
Vojtěch Plzák	200 m	23.4	1 Q	23.1	4	Did not advance			
Karel Přibyl	400 m	54.0	3	Did not advance					
Karel Přibyl	800 m	—N/a			8	Did not advance			
Jaroslav Procházka	800 m	—N/a			5	Did not advance			
Adolf Reich	110 m hurdles	—N/a			4	Did not advance			
Josef Šlehofer	3 km walk	—N/a				Disqualified		Did not advance	
Josef Šlehofer	10 km walk	—N/a				Did not finish		Did not advance	
Josef Teplý	800 m	—N/a		2:00.6	7	Did not advance			
Václav Vohralík	1500 m	—N/a				4:02.2	1 Q	4:08.0	4

Athlete	Event	Qualifying		Final	
Athlete	Event	Result	Rank	Result	Rank
František Hoplíček	Discus throw	36.75	13	Did not advance	
František Šretr	Long jump	5.55	26	Did not advance	
František Šretr	Triple jump	No mark	20	Did not advance	
František Stejskal	Triple jump	No mark	20	Did not advance	
František Stejskal	High jump	1.65	16	Did not advance	
Ardy Vydra	Javelin throw	37.75	24	Did not advance	

Athlete	Event	Final	
Athlete	Event	Result	Rank
Eduard Hašek	Decathlon	Did not finish	

== Cycling ==
Four cyclists represented Czechoslovakia in the nation's Olympic debut 1920. The four cyclists competed in the road time trials, placing ninth as a team. Procházka was the best of the four, finishing 34th individually.

=== Road cycling ===
Cyclist	Event	Final	
Cyclist	Event	Result	Rank
Ladislav Janoušek	Time trial	5:29:23.4	36
František Kundert	Time trial	5:38:07.0	39
Josef Procházka	Time trial	5:23:31.4	34
Bohumil Rameš	Time trial	5:40:00.0	40
Ladislav Janoušek; František Kundert; Josef Procházka; Bohumil Rameš	Team time trial	22:10:01.8	9

== Fencing ==
Nine fencers represented Czechoslovakia in 1920. It was the nation's debut in the sport. The country had two individual fencers reach semifinals, but neither advanced to a final. The nation's teams were unsuccessful in team competitions, unable to win a single bout.

Ranks given are within the group.

Fencer	Event	First round		Quarterfinals		Semifinals		Final	
Fencer	Event	Result	Rank	Result	Rank	Result	Rank	Result	Rank
Jan Černohorský	Épée	1–8	10	Did not advance					
František Dvořák	Foil	N/A		2–4	4	Did not advance			
Josef Javůrek	Épée	2–7	10	Did not advance					
Josef Javůrek	Foil	N/A		3–5	6	Did not advance			
Josef Javůrek	Sabre	N/A		3–3	5 Q	3–3	5	Did not advance	
Josef Jungmann	Épée	4–4	5 Q	1–9	11	Did not advance			
Josef Jungmann	Foil	N/A		1–5	6	Did not advance			
Antonín Mikala	Foil	N/A		1–4	5	Did not advance			
Jaroslav Šourek	Sabre	N/A		3–5	7	Did not advance			
Otakar Švorčík	Épée	4–4	4 Q	1–9	11	Did not advance			
Viliam Tvrský	Épée	1–7	9	Did not advance					
Viliam Tvrský	Foil	N/A		6–2	3 Q	1–4	5	Did not advance	
Viliam Tvrský	Sabre	N/A		2–5	7	Did not advance			
Zdeněk Vávra	Sabre	N/A		3–4	5	Did not advance			
František Dvořák; Josef Javůrek; Antony Mikala; Viliam Tvrský	Team foil	N/A				0–5	5	Did not advance	
Jan Černohorský; Josef Javůrek; Josef Jungmann; Otakar Švorčík; Zdeněk Vávra	Team épée	N/A				0–5	5	Did not advance	
František Dvořák; Josef Javůrek; Josef Jungmann; Antony Mikala; Otakar Švorčík	Team sabre	N/A						0–7	6

== Football ==
Czechoslovakia competed in the Olympic football tournament for the first time. The squad started strong, outscoring opponents 15 to 1 in the first three rounds to qualify for the final. There the team fell behind 2–0 to Belgium before abandoning the match in protest in the 40th minute. Czechoslovakia, which was not guaranteed the silver medal by advancing to the final due to the use of the Bergvall System, was disqualified from the competition, losing the opportunity to play in the second-place tournament.

First round

August 28, 1920

Czechoslovakia	7–0	Yugoslavia
Vaník 20' 46' 79'; Janda 34' 50' 75'; Sedláček 43'	Report

Broodstraat, Antwerp
Attendance: 600
Referee: Rafael van Praag (NED)

Quarterfinals

August 29, 1920

Czechoslovakia	4–0	Norway
Vaník 8'; Janda 17' 66' 77'	Report

La Butte, Brussels
Attendance: 4,000
Referee: Charles Barette (BEL)

Semifinals

August 31, 1920

Czechoslovakia	4–1	France
Mazal 18' 75' 87'; Steiner 70'	Report	Boyer 79'

Olympisch Stadion, Antwerp
Attendance: 12,000
Referee: Johannes Mutters (NED)

Final

September 2, 1920

Belgium	2–0	Czechoslovakia
Coppée 6' (pen.); Larnoe 30'	Report

Olympisch Stadion, Antwerp
Attendance: 35,000
Referee: John Lewis (GBR)

Final rank
Disqualified

== Gymnastics ==
Sixteen gymnasts represented Czechoslovakia in 1920. It was the nation's debut in the sport, though Bohemia had competed three times previously. No gymnasts competed in the individual all-around, and the country sent a team in only one of the three team events. That team took fourth place out of five.

=== Artistic gymnastics ===
Gymnast	Event	Final	
Gymnast	Event	Result	Rank
Josef Bochníček; Ladislav Bubeníček; Josef Čada; Stanislav Indruch; Miroslav Klinger; Josef Malý; Zdeněk Opočenský; Josef Pagáč; František Pecháček; Robert Pražák; Václav Stolař; Svatopluk Svoboda; Ladislav Vácha; František Vaněček; Jaroslav Velda; Václav Wirt	Team	305.255	4

== Ice hockey ==
Czechoslovakia competed in the inaugural Olympic ice hockey tournament. The team took a bronze medal, thanks in large part to the use of the Bergvall System in the tournament. This system allowed the team to continue competing despite an early loss. Czechoslovakia was blown out by Canada, 15 to nil, in the quarterfinals. Because Canada went on to win the gold medal, the Bergvall System operated to put Czechoslovakia in the silver medal tournament; there, the team received a bye in the semifinals and went immediately to play against the United States in the silver medal match. The Americans did Canada one better, beating Czechoslovakia 16 to nothing. Still the Czechoslovak team was not done; having lost only to the gold and silver medalists, the team competed for the bronze medal. Again Czechoslovakia received a semifinal bye, facing Sweden in the bronze medal match. This time, they were on the right end of the shutout, beating the Swedes 1 to zero to finish in third place.

Roster

Coach: (Czechoslovakia) Adolf Dušek

Pos	Player	GP	G	Birthdate	Age
R	Karel Hartmann	3	0	July 6, 1885	34
F	Vilém Loos	3	0	September 20, 1895	24
D	Jan Palouš	3	0	October 25, 1888	31
G	Jan Peka	2	0	July 27, 1894	25
F	Karel Pešek	3	0	September 20, 1895	24
F	Josef Šroubek	3	1	December 2, 1891	28
D	Otto Vindyš	3	0	April 9, 1884	36
G	Karel Wälzer	1	0	August 28, 1888	31
G	Karel Kotrba	0	–		

Gold medal quarterfinals

24 April 1920; 21:30	Canada	15 – 0 (7–0, 8–0)	Czechoslovakia	Palais de Glace d'Anvers

Game reference
Walter Byron	Goalies	Jan Peka
Halderson (7); Fredrickson (4); Goodman (2); Woodman; Johannesson / Goals
0 min	Penalties	0 min

Silver medal match

28 April 1920; 22:00	(silver) United States	16 – 0 (7–0, 9–0)	Czechoslovakia	Palais de Glace d'Anvers

Game reference
Cy Weidenborner	Goalies	Jan Peka	Referee: (Belgium) Paul Loicq
L. McCormick (7); Drury (4); Conroy (2); Goheen; J. McCormick; Synott / Goals			Referee: (Belgium) Paul Loicq
0 min	Penalties	0 min	Referee: (Belgium) Paul Loicq

Bronze medal match

29 April 1920; 23:00	(bronze) Czechoslovakia	1 – 0 (1–0, 0–0)	Sweden	Palais de Glace d'Anvers

Game reference
Karel Wälzer	Goalies	Seth Howander	Referee: (Canada) Frank Fredrickson
Šroubek / 1 – 0			Referee: (Canada) Frank Fredrickson
0 min	Penalties	0 min	Referee: (Canada) Frank Fredrickson
2	Shots	48	Referee: (Canada) Frank Fredrickson

Final rank
(bronze) Bronze

== Rowing ==
Fifteen rowers represented Czechoslovakia in the nation's debut in 1920 (Bohemia had competed in rowing once, in 1912). The nation sent three boats, each of which came in last in their initial heats in its event and did not advance.

Ranks given are within the heat.

Rower	Cox	Event	Quarterfinals		Semifinals		Final	
Rower	Cox	Event	Result	Rank	Result	Rank	Result	Rank
Gustav Zinke	N/A	Single sculls	Unknown	3	Did not advance			
Jindřich Mulač; Jaroslav Oplt; Dominik Štillip; Jiří Wihan	Jan Bauch	Coxed four	N/A		Unknown	3	Did not advance	
Ferdinand Brožek; Bohdan Kallmünzer; Jiří Kallmünzer; Emil Ordnung; Ivan Schweizer; Josef Širc; Vladimír Širc; Otakar Votík	Karel Čížek	Eight	6:43.0	2	Did not advance			

== Shooting ==
Eight shooters represented Czechoslovakia in 1920. It was the nation's debut in the sport as well as the Olympics.

Shooter	Event	Final	
Shooter	Event	Result	Rank
Antonín Brych	300 m free rifle, 3 pos.	Unknown	
Rudolf Jelen	300 m free rifle, 3 pos.	Unknown	
Václav Kindl	300 m free rifle, 3 pos.	Unknown	
Josef Linert	300 m free rifle, 3 pos.	Unknown	
Josef Sucharda	300 m free rifle, 3 pos.	Unknown	
František Bláha; Antonín Brych; Václav Kindl; František Procházka; Josef Štojdl	50 m team free pistol	Did not finish	
Antonín Brych; Rudolf Jelen; Václav Kindl; Josef Linert; Josef Sucharda	Team free rifle	3542	14
Antonín Brych; Rudolf Jelen; Václav Kindl; Josef Linert; Josef Sucharda	300 m team military rifle, prone	271	10
Antonín Brych; Rudolf Jelen; Václav Kindl; Josef Linert; Josef Sucharda	300 m team military rifle, standing	200	14
Antonín Brych; Rudolf Jelen; Václav Kindl; Josef Linert; Josef Sucharda	600 m team military rifle, prone	258	11
Antonín Brych; Rudolf Jelen; Václav Kindl; Josef Linert; Josef Sucharda	300 & 600 m team military rifle, prone	536	8

== Tennis ==
Seven tennis players, including one woman, competed for Czechoslovakia in 1920. It was the nation's debut in the sport as well as the Olympics, though Bohemia had competed three times. Three of the Czechoslovak men had previously competed. Skrbková, the lone woman, did not compete in the singles but only as part of a mixed pair with Žemla-Rázný. That pair won the bronze medal, contributing three of the nation's four match wins in 1920. Žemla-Rázný was also involved in the fourth, as part of a men's pair with Ardelt which won its first match before being defeated. The other two men's pairs, as well as all four men's singles players, were defeated in their first match.

Player	Event	Round of 64	Round of 32	Round of 16	Quarterfinals	Semifinals	Finals	Rank
Player	Event	Opposition Score	Opposition Score	Opposition Score	Opposition Score	Opposition Score	Opposition Score	Rank
Karel Ardelt	Men's singles	Bye	Beamish (GBR); L 6–2, 6–4, 6–3	Did not advance				17
Jaroslav Just	Men's singles	Alonso (ESP); L 6–3, 2–6, 6–0, 6–2	Did not advance					32
Otto Woffek	Men's singles	Beamish (GBR); L 6–1, 6–3, 6–4	Did not advance					32
Ladislav Žemla-Rázný	Men's singles	Bye	Malström (SWE); L 4–6, 6–2, 6–3, 7–5	Did not advance				17
Karel Ardelt; Ladislav Žemla-Rázný	Men's doubles	N/A	Laloux & Laloux (BEL); W 6–2, 6–4, 6–4	Norton & Raymond (RSA); L 6–1, 6–4, 6–4	Did not advance			9
Bohuslav Hykš-Černý; Jaroslav Just	Men's doubles	N/A	Bye	Blanchy & Brugnon (FRA); L 6–1, 6–2, 6–4	Did not advance			9
Milada Skrbková; Ladislav Žemla-Rázný	Mixed doubles	N/A	Bye	Dupont & Laloux (BEL); W 7–5, 6–4	Halot & Storms (BEL); W 7–5, 6–3	McKane & Woosnam (GBR); L 9–7, 6–3	Hansen & Tegner (DEN); W 8–6, 6–4	3rd place, bronze medalist(s)
František Týř; Otto Woffek	Men's doubles	N/A	Bye	Turnbull & Woosnam (GBR); L 6–1, 6–2, 6–3	Did not advance			9

Opponent nation	Wins	Losses	Percent
Belgium	3	0	1.000
Denmark	1	0	1.000
France	0	1	.000
Great Britain	0	4	.000
South Africa	0	1	.000
Spain	0	1	.000
Sweden	0	1	.000
Total	4	8	.333

Round	Wins	Losses	Percent
Round of 64	0	2	.000
Round of 32	1	2	.333
Round of 16	1	3	.250
Quarterfinals	1	0	.000
Semifinals	0	1	.000
Final	0	0	–
Bronze match	1	0	1.000
Total	4	8	.333

== Weightlifting ==
Two weightlifters represented Czechoslovakia in 1920. It was the nation's debut in the sport as well as the Games. Wágner placed fifth and Dvořák took eighth in their respective weight classes.

Weightlifter	Weight class	Final	
Weightlifter	Weight class	Result	Rank
Jaroslav Dvořák	82.5 kg	227.5	8
Ludvík Wágner	60 kg	195.0	5

== Wrestling ==
Ten wrestlers, two in each of the Greco-Roman weight classes, competed for Czechoslovakia in 1920. It was the nation's debut in the sport as well as the Games, though Bohemia had competed twice previously. Czechoslovakia had no freestyle wrestlers in 1920.

=== Greco-Roman ===
Wrestler	Event	Round of 32	Round of 16	Quarterfinals	Semifinals	Finals	Rank
Wrestler	Event	Round of 32	Round of 16	Silver quarters	Silver semis	Silver match	Rank
Wrestler	Event	Round of 32	Round of 16	Bronze quarters	Bronze semis	Bronze match	Rank
Jan Balej	Greco-Roman middle	Bye	Corsanego (ITA) (W)	Lindfors (FIN) (L)	Did not advance		7
Jan Balej	Greco-Roman middle	Bye	Corsanego (ITA) (W)	Did not advance			7
Jan Balej	Greco-Roman middle	Bye	Corsanego (ITA) (W)	Eillebrecht (NED) (L)	Did not advance		7
Josef Beránek	Greco-Roman feather	Bye	Bouquet (FRA) (W)	Pütsep (EST) (L)	Did not advance		9
Josef Beránek	Greco-Roman feather	Bye	Bouquet (FRA) (W)	N/A	Did not advance		9
Josef Beránek	Greco-Roman feather	Bye	Bouquet (FRA) (W)	Did not advance			9
Karel Halík	Greco-Roman light	Bye	Coerse (NED) (L)	Did not advance			12
Karel Halík	Greco-Roman light	Bye	Coerse (NED) (L)	Did not advance			12
Karel Halík	Greco-Roman light	Bye	Coerse (NED) (L)	Did not advance			12
Josef Huml	Greco-Roman middle	Prunier (FRA) (W)	Szymanski (USA) (L)	Did not advance			13
Josef Huml	Greco-Roman middle	Prunier (FRA) (W)	Szymanski (USA) (L)	Did not advance			13
Josef Huml	Greco-Roman middle	Prunier (FRA) (W)	Szymanski (USA) (L)	Did not advance			13
Václav Kocián	Greco-Roman light heavy	Bye	Snoeck (BEL) (L)	Did not advance			10
Václav Kocián	Greco-Roman light heavy	Bye	Snoeck (BEL) (L)	N/A	Did not advance		10
Václav Kocián	Greco-Roman light heavy	Bye	Snoeck (BEL) (L)	N/A			10
František Kopřiva	Greco-Roman light	Bye	Tamminen (FIN) (L)	Did not advance			5
František Kopřiva	Greco-Roman light	Bye	Tamminen (FIN) (L)	Did not advance			5
František Kopřiva	Greco-Roman light	Bye	Tamminen (FIN) (L)	Bye	Andersen (NOR) (L)	Did not advance	5
Jan Kraus	Greco-Roman heavy	Calza (ITA) (L)	Did not advance	Did not advance			18
Jan Kraus	Greco-Roman heavy	Calza (ITA) (L)	Did not advance	Did not advance			18
Jan Kraus	Greco-Roman heavy	Calza (ITA) (L)	Did not advance	Did not advance			18
František Řezáč	Greco-Roman feather	Torgensen (DEN) (L)	Did not advance	Did not advance			17
František Řezáč	Greco-Roman feather	Torgensen (DEN) (L)	Did not advance	N/A	Did not advance		17
František Řezáč	Greco-Roman feather	Torgensen (DEN) (L)	Did not advance	Did not advance			17
Josef Struna	Greco-Roman heavy	Willkie (USA) (L)	Did not advance	Did not advance			18
Josef Struna	Greco-Roman heavy	Willkie (USA) (L)	Did not advance	Did not advance			18
Josef Struna	Greco-Roman heavy	Willkie (USA) (L)	Did not advance	Did not advance			18
František Tázler	Greco-Roman light heavy	Theisen (LUX) (W)	Rajala (FIN) (L)	Did not advance			10
František Tázler	Greco-Roman light heavy	Theisen (LUX) (W)	Rajala (FIN) (L)	N/A	Did not advance		10
František Tázler	Greco-Roman light heavy	Theisen (LUX) (W)	Rajala (FIN) (L)	N/A			10

Opponent nation	Wins	Losses	Percent
Belgium	0	1	.000
Denmark	0	1	.000
Estonia	0	1	.000
Finland	0	3	.000
France	2	0	1.000
Italy	1	1	.500
Luxembourg	1	0	1.000
Netherlands	0	2	.000
Norway	0	1	.000
United States	0	2	.000
Total	4	12	.250

Round	Wins	Losses	Percent
Round of 32	2	3	.400
Round of 16	2	5	.286
Quarterfinals	0	2	.000
Semifinals	0	0	–
Final	0	0	–
Silver quarterfinals	0	0	–
Silver semifinals	0	0	–
Silver match	0	0	–
Bronze quarterfinals	0	1	.000
Bronze semifinals	0	1	.000
Bronze match	0	0	–
Total	4	12	.250
