= Swimming at the 1920 Summer Olympics – Men's 100 metre freestyle =

Men's 100 metre freestyle at the Games of the VII Olympiad
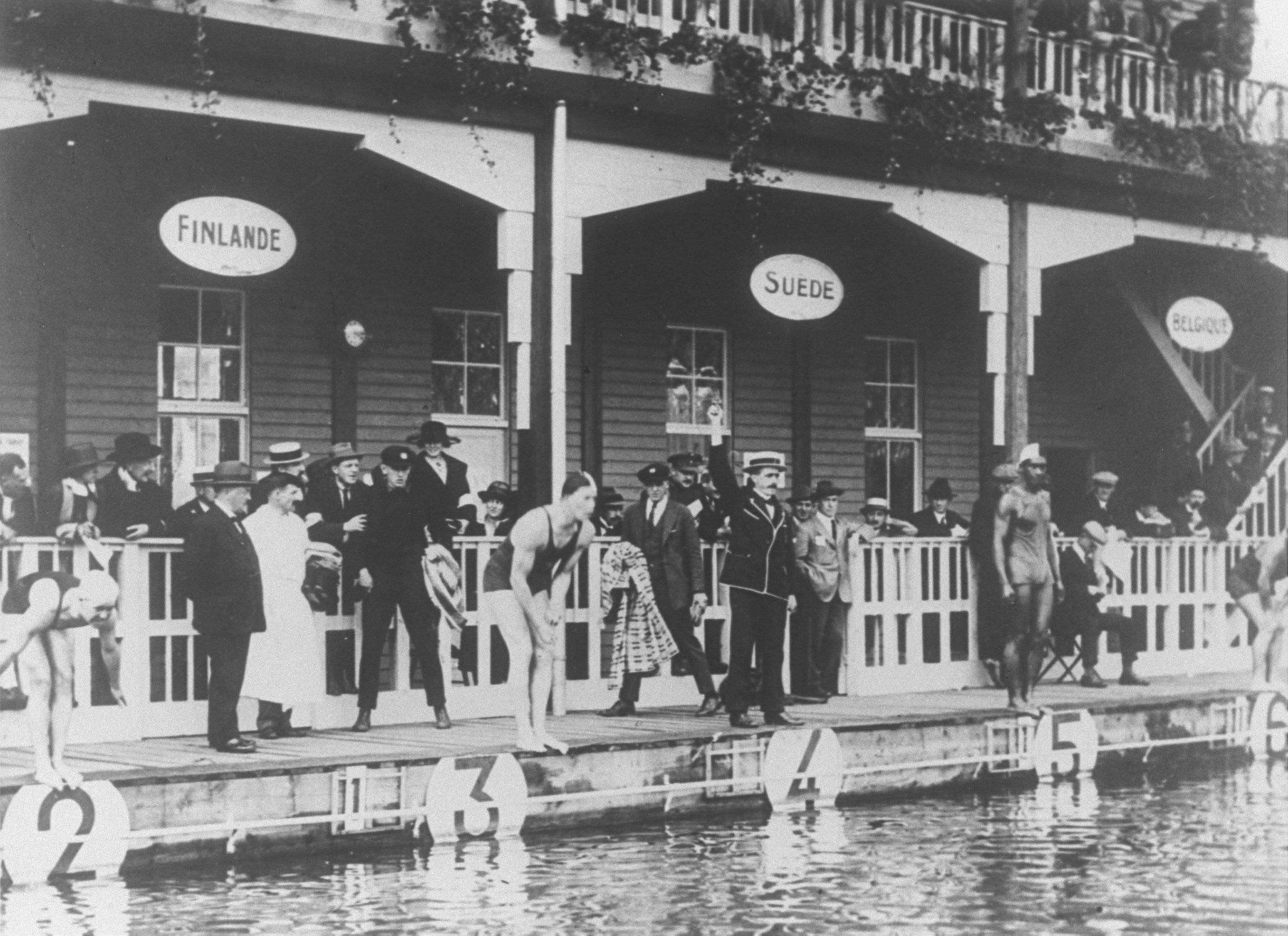
- Swimming at the 1920 Olympics
- Venue: Stade Nautique d'Antwerp
- Dates: August 22–29
- Competitors: 31 from 15 nations
- Winning time: 1:01.4

Medalists
1st place, gold medalist(s)		Duke Kahanamoku; United States
2nd place, silver medalist(s)		Pua Kealoha; United States
3rd place, bronze medalist(s)		Bill Harris; United States

The men's 100 metre freestyle was a swimming event held as part of the swimming at the 1920 Summer Olympics programme. It was the fourth appearance of the event. A total of 31 swimmers from 15 nations competed in the event, which was held from August 22 to August 29, 1920. Nations were limited to four swimmers each. The United States swept the medals, and Duke Kahanamoku broke his own Olympic record in the semifinals and bettered his time again in the final to successfully defend his championship from 1912. Kahanamoku was the first man to successfully defend an Olympic 100 metres freestyle title (excluding Charles Daniels's win in the 1906 Intercalated Games) and third man to win multiple medals of any color in the event (including Daniels's silver and Zoltán Halmay's gold in the 1904 yards-based event).

== Background ==
This was the fifth appearance of the men's 100 metre freestyle. The event has been held at every Summer Olympics except 1900 (when the shortest freestyle was the 200 metres), though the 1904 version was measured in yards rather than metres.

One of the six finalists from 1912 returned: gold medalist Duke Kahanamoku of the United States. The favorites were Kahanamoku and fellow American Norman Ross, the 1919 Inter-Allied Games winner. Kahanamoku had broken the world record in 1918.

Brazil, Czechoslovakia, Japan, Luxembourg, and Switzerland each made their debut in the event; Australia made its first appearance separate from New Zealand (the two had previously competed together as Australasia). The United States made its fifth appearance, having competed at each edition of the event to date. Hungary missed the event for the first time, with the nation not invited to the Games after World War I.

== Competition format ==
The competition used a three-round (quarterfinals, semifinals, final) format. The advancement rule was the same used in 1912; for each round before the final, the top two in each heat plus the fastest third-place swimmer would advance. There were 6 quarterfinals of between 4 and 7 swimmers, allowing 13 swimmers to advance to the semifinals. The 2 semifinals had 6 or 7 swimmers; 5 advanced to the final.

== Records ==
These were the standing world and Olympic records (in minutes) prior to the 1920 Summer Olympics.

World record	Duke Kahanamoku (USA)	1:01.4	New York City, United States	9 August 1918
Olympic record	Duke Kahanamoku (USA)	1:02.4	Stockholm, Sweden	7 July 1912

In the first heat Duke Kahanamoku set a new Olympic record with 1:01.8 minutes. In the semi-final he equalled the standing world record with 1:01.4 minutes. In the final which was later re-swum Kahanamoku set a new world record with 1:00.4 minutes, in the second final he equalled his record of 1:01.4 minutes again.

== Schedule ==
Date	Time	Round
Sunday, 22 August 1920	18:30	Heats
Monday, 23 August 1920	15:15	Semifinals
Tuesday, 24 August 1920	17:10	Final
Sunday, 29 August 1920	16:45	Final re-run

== Results ==
=== Heats ===
The fastest two in each heat and the fastest third-placed from across the heats advanced.

==== Heat 1 ====
Rank	Swimmer	Nation	Time	Notes
1	Duke Kahanamoku	United States	1:01.8	Q, OR
2	Keith Kirkland	Australia	1:08.0	Q
3	Jean van Silfhout	Netherlands	1:09.0	
4	Georges Pouilley	France	Unknown	
5	Albert Dickin	Great Britain	Unknown	

==== Heat 2 ====
Rank	Swimmer	Nation	Time	Notes
1	Agostino Frassinetti	Italy	1:11.8	Q
2	Václav Bucháček	Czechoslovakia	1:19.2	Q
3	Ângelo Gammaro	Brazil	1:22.0	
4	Harold Annison	Great Britain	Unknown	

==== Heat 3 ====
Rank	Swimmer	Nation	Time	Notes
1	Pua Kealoha	United States	1:02.0	Q
2	Ivan Stedman	Australia	1:04.2	Q
3	Henri Padou	France	1:08.4	
4	Martial van Schelle	Belgium	Unknown	
5	Jean Jenni	Switzerland	Unknown	
6	Kenkichi Saito	Japan	Unknown	

==== Heat 4 ====
Rank	Swimmer	Nation	Time	Notes
1	George Vernot	Canada	1:05.2	Q
2	Harry Hay	Australia	1:06.8	Q
3	Orvar Trolle	Sweden	1:07.8	q
4	Léon Pesch	Luxembourg	Unknown	
5	Leslie Savage	Great Britain	Unknown	
6	Orlando Amêndola	Brazil	Unknown	
7	Gérard Blitz	Belgium	Unknown	

==== Heat 5 ====
Rank	Swimmer	Nation	Time	Notes
1	Norman Ross	United States	1:04.2	Q
2	William Herald	Australia	1:08.8	Q
3	Mario Massa	Italy	1:10.4	
4	Rémy Weil	France	Unknown	
5	Masayoshi Uchida	Japan	Unknown	

==== Heat 6 ====
Rank	Swimmer	Nation	Time	Notes
1	Bill Harris	United States	1:04.4	Q
2	Ko Korsten	Netherlands	1:05.6	Q
3	Jack Dickin	Great Britain	1:10.0	
4	Alfred Steen	Norway	Unknown	

=== Semifinals ===
The fastest two in each semi-final and the faster of the two third-placed swimmer advanced to the final.

==== Semifinal 1 ====
Rank	Swimmer	Nation	Time	Notes
1	Duke Kahanamoku	United States	1:01.4	Q, =WR
2	Bill Harris	United States	1:04.2	Q
3	George Vernot	Canada	1:05.8	
4	Agostino Frassinetti	Italy	Unknown	
5	Václav Bucháček	Czechoslovakia	Unknown	
6	Harry Hay	Australia	Unknown	

==== Semifinal 2 ====
Rank	Swimmer	Nation	Time	Notes
1	Pua Kealoha	United States	1:02.4	Q
2	Norman Ross	United States	1:04.8	Q
3	William Herald	Australia	1:05.8	q
4	Ivan Stedman	Australia	Unknown	
5	Orvar Trolle	Sweden	Unknown	
6	Keith Kirkland	Australia	Unknown	
7	Ko Korsten	Netherlands	Unknown	

=== Final ===
In the first final Norman Ross finished fourth and William Herald finished fifth, but a second final was run after a protest by Herald, claiming that Ross had fouled him. For the second run Ross was disqualified. None of the medal ranks changed.

Rank	Swimmer	Nation	Time (1st)	Time (2nd)	Notes
1st place, gold medalist(s)	Duke Kahanamoku	United States	1:00.4	1:01.4	WR
2nd place, silver medalist(s)	Pua Kealoha	United States	1:02.2	1:02.6	
3rd place, bronze medalist(s)	Bill Harris	United States	1:03.2	1:03.0	
4	William Herald	Australia	Unknown	1:03.8	
—	Norman Ross	United States	DSQ (1:03.8)	—	

== Results summary ==
Rank	Swimmer	Nation	Heats	Semifinals	Final	Notes
1st place, gold medalist(s)	Duke Kahanamoku	United States	1:01.8	1:01.4	1:01.4	WR 1:00.4 in final before re-run
2nd place, silver medalist(s)	Pua Kealoha	United States	1:02.0	1:02.4	1:02.6	
3rd place, bronze medalist(s)	Bill Harris	United States	1:04.4	1:04.2	1:03.0	
4	William Herald	Australia	1:08.8	1:05.8	1:03.8	
5	Norman Ross	United States	1:04.2	1:04.8	DSQ	
6	George Vernot	Canada	1:05.2	1:05.8	Did not advance	
7	Agostino Frassinetti	Italy	1:11.8	Unknown	Did not advance	4th in semifinal
7	Ivan Stedman	Australia	1:04.2	Unknown	Did not advance	4th in semifinal
9	Václav Bucháček	Czechoslovakia	1:19.2	Unknown	Did not advance	5th in semifinal
9	Orvar Trolle	Sweden	1:07.8	Unknown	Did not advance	5th in semifinal
11	Harry Hay	Australia	1:06.8	Unknown	Did not advance	6th in semifinal
11	Keith Kirkland	Australia	1:08.0	Unknown	Did not advance	6th in semifinal
13	Ko Korsten	Netherlands	1:05.6	Unknown	Did not advance	7th in semifinal
14	Henri Padou	France	1:08.4	did not advance		
15	Jean van Silfhout	Netherlands	1:09.0	did not advance		
16	Jack Dickin	Great Britain	1:10.0	did not advance		
17	Mario Massa	Italy	1:10.4	did not advance		
18	Ângelo Gammaro	Brazil	1:22.0	did not advance		
19	Harold Annison	Great Britain	Unknown	did not advance		4th in heat
19	Léon Pesch	Luxembourg	Unknown	did not advance		4th in heat
19	Georges Pouilley	France	Unknown	did not advance		4th in heat
19	Alfred Steen	Norway	Unknown	did not advance		4th in heat
19	Martial van Schelle	Belgium	Unknown	did not advance		4th in heat
19	Rémy Weil	France	Unknown	did not advance		4th in heat
25	Albert Dickin	Great Britain	Unknown	did not advance		5th in heat
25	Jean Jenni	Switzerland	Unknown	did not advance		5th in heat
25	Leslie Savage	Great Britain	Unknown	did not advance		5th in heat
25	Masaren Uchida	Japan	Unknown	did not advance		5th in heat
29	Orlando Amêndola	Brazil	Unknown	did not advance		6th in heat
29	Kenkichi Saito	Japan	Unknown	did not advance		6th in heat
31	Gérard Blitz	Belgium	Unknown	did not advance		7th in heat

== Notes ==
- Belgium Olympic Committee (1957). Olympic Games Antwerp 1920: Official Report (in French).
- Wudarski, Pawel (1999). "Wyniki Igrzysk Olimpijskich" (in Polish).
