= Černík =

Černík may refer to:

- Černík, Slovakia, a municipality and village in Slovakia
- Černík (surname), Czech surname

== See also ==
- Cernik (disambiguation)
