= Shooting at the 1920 Summer Olympics – Men's 30 metre rapid fire pistol =

Sports shooting at the Olympics

Men's 30 metre military pistol at the Games of the VII Olympiad
- Shooting pictogram
- Venue: Beverloo Camp
- Date: 3 August 1920
- Competitors: 11 from 3 nations
- winning score: 274

Medalists
1st place, gold medalist(s)		Guilherme Paraense; Brazil
2nd place, silver medalist(s)		Raymond Bracken; United States
3rd place, bronze medalist(s)		Fritz Zulauf; Switzerland

The men's 30 metre rapid fire pistol, labeled the "revolver" in the Official Report and often described as a "military pistol" event was a shooting sports event held as part of the Shooting at the 1920 Summer Olympics programme. The International Shooting Sport Federation identified this event as the fourth appearance of an individual 25 metre rapid fire pistol event; it was the second time the distance was 30 metres (after 1912). In 1896 the distance was 25 metres; in 1900, 20 metres. The competition was held on 3 August 1920. 11 shooters from 3 nations competed. The event was won by Guilherme Paraense in Brazil's debut in the event; it was Brazil's first Olympic gold in any event. American Raymond Bracken took silver, while Swiss shooter Fritz Zulauf earned his nation's first medal in the event.

== Background ==
This was the fourth appearance of what would become standardised as the men's ISSF 25 meter rapid fire pistol event, the only event on the 2020 programme that traces back to 1896. The event has been held at every Summer Olympics except 1904 and 1928 (when no shooting events were held) and 1908; it was nominally open to women from 1968 to 1980, although very few women participated these years. The 1920 event was very different from the 1896 event, the 1900 event, and the 1912 event which were also all quite different from each other. Standardization would come in 1924, the next time the event was held.

Brazil made its debut appearance in the event; the United States and Switzerland each appeared for the second time, tied with France, Great Britain, and Greece for most of any nation.

The Brazilian team used Smith & Wesson revolvers with adjustable sights. The Americans used the Colt Army Special or the Smith & Wesson Military with fixed sights.

== Competition format ==
The format was 30 shots in 5 series of 6 shots each. 30 hits were possible, with 300 points possible. Scores from the team competition could be used for the individual competition.

== Schedule ==
Date	Time	Round
Tuesday, 3 August 1920		Final

== Results ==
The format was 30 shots in five series of six shots. Team competitors could allow their score to stand for the individual match. The maximum individual score was 300. Guilherme Paraense won the first Olympic gold medal for Brazil ever.

Rank	Shooter	Nation	Total
1st place, gold medalist(s)	Guilherme Paraense	Brazil	274
2nd place, silver medalist(s)	Raymond Bracken	United States	272
3rd place, bronze medalist(s)	Fritz Zulauf	Switzerland	269
4	Louis Harant	United States	264
5	Karl Frederick	United States	262
6	Alfred Lane	United States	258
7	Mário Maurity	Brazil	249
7	Sebastião Wolf	Brazil	249
9	Fernando Soledade	Brazil	248
10	Howard Bayles	United States	244
11	Demerval Peixoto	Brazil	241
