= Dickin =

Dickin is a surname of English and Irish origin originating in the mid-11th century during the Norman conquests.

== History ==
The origin of the Dickin surname stems from the Norman conquests of 1066 and King Richard the First of England. Patronymic naming, established following the Norman conquests, meant that Richard's son would become Richardson (Richard + Son). Eventually, as the shorthand for Richard became "Dick" the name morphed into Dickson and several other related names. In order to be gender neutral, the name also morphed into being the kin of Richard, as in Richard's kin or Dick + Kin, which was eventually shortened to Dickin.

== Geographic settlement ==
=== Great Britain ===
The 1891 England and Wales census shows a high concentration of Dickin families in Lancashire (19%), Shropshire (23%), and Staffordshire (15%). A large number of records between 1532 and 1812 show the prominent use of the Dickin surname at that time.

=== North America ===
The earliest known records of the Dickin family in North America show John Dickin landing in New England in 1753 and Alexander Dickin landing in Maryland in 1813.

== Alternate spellings ==
While the root of the surname is always Richard, the Dickin surname has seen its spelling changed. This is mainly due to the societal illiteracy of the time; writing had not become widespread throughout society and many names were spoken, but rarely written.

- Dicun
- Dycon
- Diccon
- Dykyns
- Dikins
- Dicin
- Dikun
- Dicon
- Dicconson

== Related surnames ==
With Richard as its root patronymic, Dickin is related to several other surnames:

- Richard
- Richardson
- Dickson
- Dickens
- Dickenson
- Dixon
- Dickins

== Notable people with the surname ==
- Albert Dickin (1901–1955), British swimmer
- John Dickin (1899–1966), British swimmer
- Maria Dickin (1870–1951), British social reformer
- Mike Dickin (1943–2006), English radio DJ

== See also ==
- Dickin Medal, award for animals, known as "the animals' Victoria Cross"
