= Charles Horn =

Charles Horne may refer to:

- Charles Horn (writer), Canadian comedy writer and producer
- Charles Horn (water polo), Swiss Olympic water polo player
- Charles C. Horn, American behavioral neuroscientist
- Charles Edward Horn (1786–1849), English composer and singer
- Charles Frederick Horn (1762–1830), English musician and composer
- Charles L. Horn (fl. 1922), founder of Federal Cartridge Corporation
- Chuck Horn, Ohio state senator

== See also ==
- Charles Horne (disambiguation)
- Charles Horner (disambiguation)
