= Bill Harris (swimmer) =

American swimmer (1897–1961)

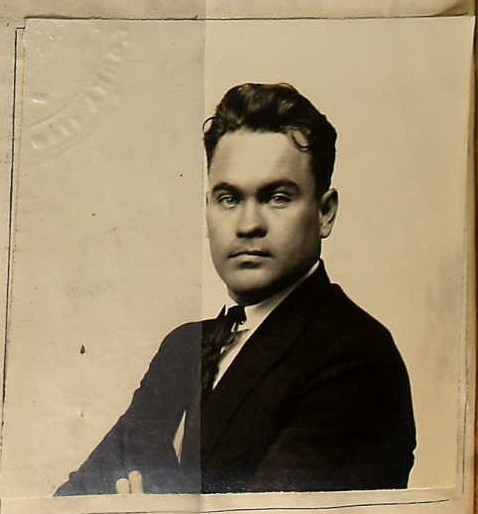

Personal information
- Full name: William White Harris, Jr.
- National team: United States
- Born: October 26, 1897 Honolulu, Hawaii
- Died: March 7, 1961 (aged 63) Honolulu, Hawaii, U.S.

Sport
- Sport: Swimming
- Strokes: Freestyle
- Club: Columbia Club of Manila; Outrigger Canoe Club, Hawaii
- Coach: George "Dad" Center
Medal record
Men's swimming
Representing the United States
Olympic Games
Bronze medal – third place	1920 Antwerp	100 m freestyle

William White Harris, Jr. (October 26, 1897 – March 7, 1961) was a Hawaiian born American competition swimmer who represented the United States at the 1920 Summer Olympics in Antwerp, Belgium, and received a bronze medal in the 100-meter freestyle.

Bill W. Harris Jr. was born on October 26, 1897 to William White Harris, Sr., and Evelyn Pearl Dexter on October 26, 1897 in Honolulu, Hawaii. Harris's father William, born in Indianapolis, worked throughout Asia, and eventually moved to Manila in the Philippines for a job in mining.

== Early life and swimming ==
Harris circa 1915

In his early years in Hawaii, Bill Harris Jr. swam for the Myrtle Club in Honolulu that also featured rowing shells. After moving from Hawaii, he lived in the Philippines from 1912-1918, where he won numerous titles in swimming, and held freestyle records from the 50-yard distance to the 1650-yard mile. In 1915, he was selected to coach the Philippine National Swimming team at the Far Eastern Olympiad in Shanghai. At the Shanghai Olympiad, Harris won all six swimming events, with many of his records standing for decades. Harris also competed in bowling and handball.

While in the Philippines, he swam for the Columbia Club of Manila, and held the fastest time ever recorded in Manila of .56.4 in the 100-yard event. He had a time of 2:29.8 at 220-yards which rivalled the time of former Olympian Duke Kohanamoku.

At 21, Harris returned to Hawaii in December 1918, and began focused swim training with Hawaiian-born George "Dad" David Center at Honolulu's Outrigger Canoe Club. A somewhat demanding swim coach, Center was an outstanding fundraiser and meet organizer. Center also coached surfing, paddling, volleyball, and track, and mentored a number of outstanding swimmers, including Olympic gold medalist and world record holder Duke Kohanamoku.

Swimming for the Outrigger Club of Honolulu at the AAU Centennial Oahu Water Meet in Honolulu on April 17, 1920, Harris defeated future 100-yard world record holder Duke Kahanamoku and talented freestyler Harold Kruger in the 220-yard event. He completed the swim in a time of 2:30.2. Demonstrating he could compete against champions, Harris passed Kahanamoku only a few yards from the finish.

== 1920 Olympic bronze ==
=== Olympic trials ===
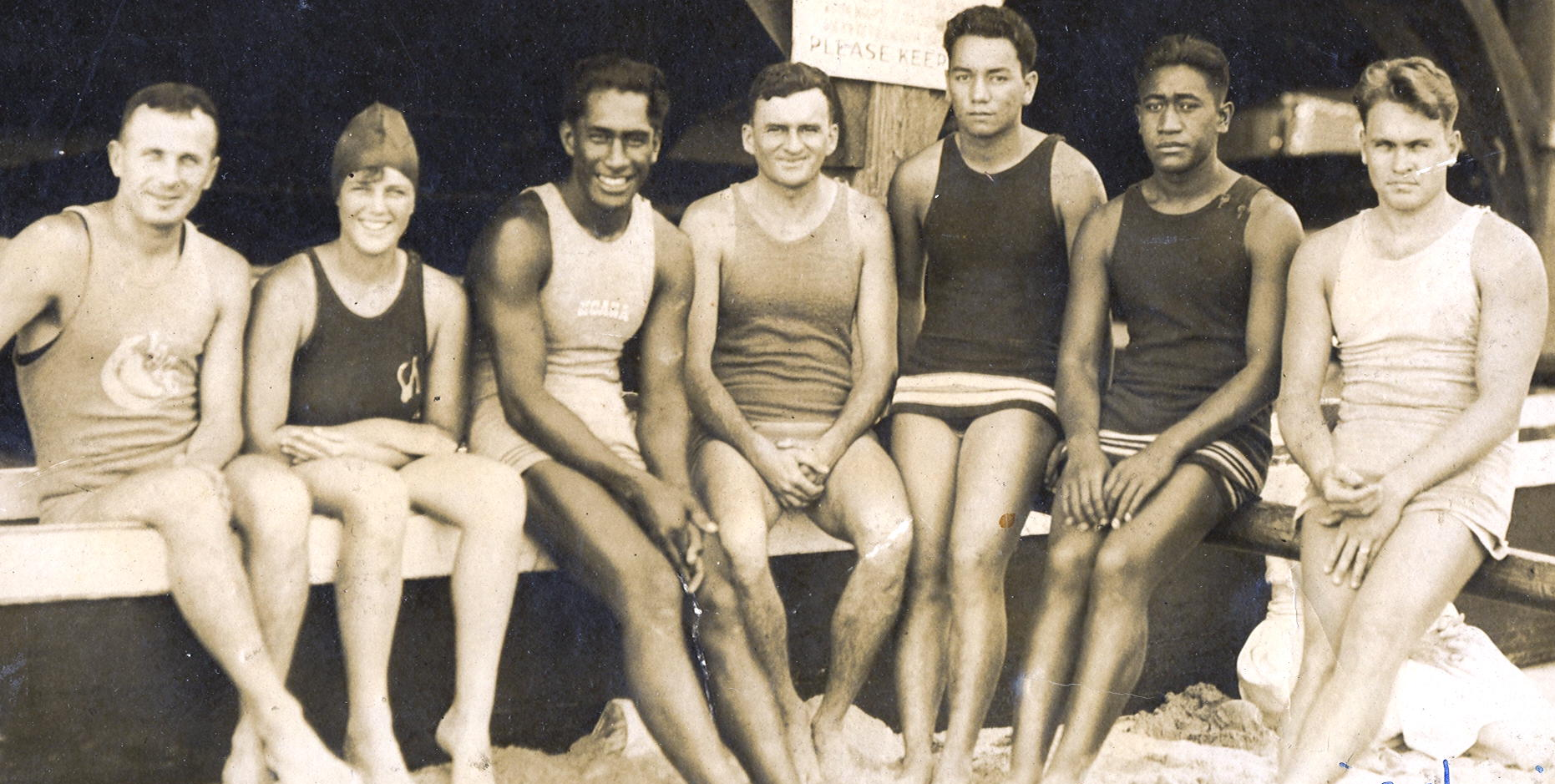
Hawaiian Team selected for 1920 Olympic try-outs

Hawaiians who qualified for the 1920 Olympic try-outs shown left to right: Ludy Langer, Helen Moses, Duke Kahanamoku, Dad Center, Warren Kealoha, Pua Kealoha, and Bill Harris.

At the first round of the 1920 Olympic trials on June 27, 1920 at Neptune Beach in San Francisco, Harris placed third in the 100-meter freestyle final behind first place Duke Kahanamoku, who set a new world record of 1:00.2. Harris also swam with the winning Hawaiian Association 4x200-yard relay team led by Duke Kahanamoku, setting a new record time of 9:00.2. Harris's performance qualified him to the next stage of the trials in Chicago.

Harris and the Hawaii swimmers moved to the last Olympic trial round of competition in Chicago. All the male Hawaiian male swimmers qualified for the 1920 U.S. Men’s Olympic Swimming team.

=== Antwerp Olympics ===
At the 1920 Olympics in Antwerp, Harris competed in the men's 100-meter freestyle. Bill won the first 100-meter freestyle preliminary heat with a time of 1:04.4, and placed second to Duke Kahanamoku in the semifinals with a time of 1:04.2. Harris advanced to the final of the men's Olympic 100-meter swim event.

The original 100-meter final had to be swum a second time due to a protest filed by Bill Herald of the Australian team against Norman Ross of the American team. As he had in the first final, in the second final World record holder Duke Kahanamoku finished first for the gold with a time of 1:01.4. Performing well, Harris received the bronze medal for his third-place finish in 1:03.0, a second faster than he swam in the first final and less than two seconds behind the first place finisher Kahanamoku. At the Antwerp Olympics, Harris was coached by Assistant Olympic swim coach George Center, who had coached him at the Outrigger Canoe Club.

Harris also swam in the men's 400-meter freestyle, and advanced to the event semifinal, posting a time of 5:36.0. The race was won by American Norman Ross, who would later become known as a sports announcer.

At the Antwerp Olympics that summer, the swimmers from the Hawaiian team, swept the first three places in the 100-meter freestyle. As noted, Duke Kahanamoku set a world record of 1:00.4 with teammates Pua Kealoha and Harris not far behind. In the 100-meter backstroke, Hawaiian Warren Kealoha captured gold, and another Hawaiian, Harold Kruger, finished fifth.

=== Life after the 1920 Olympics ===
After swimming a meet in Australia in 1922, he married his first wife Australian Ada Margaret Harrison in Sydney, Australia in 1923, and shortly after returned to Manila. There the couple had their daughter Shirley Mae. After divorcing his first wife, and marrying his second wife Janet Agnes Foran on February 10, 1932 in Manila, Harris returned to Hawaii with Janet and their daughter Louis Lane Harris in the 1940's after WWII, and remained there.

On his return to Hawaii, Harris was a Sales Manager for the Pressed Steel Car Company in Honolulu in the 1950's and was office manager for U.S. Industries, after it changed its name from the Pressed Steel Car Company in 1954.

Harris died at age 63 on March 7, 1961 of shock from a kidney condition at St. Francis Hospital in Honolulu, Hawaii. He was survived by a daughter and a sister. A mass was held March 14, 1961, at St. Augustine Catholic Church, and he was buried at Honolulu's Hawaiian Memorial Park. His wife Janet of twenty-nine years predeceased him in May, 1960 when she was struck at a pedestrian crossing. Harris had a daughter from each marriage.

=== Honors ===
Bill was inducted into the Hawaii Swimming Hall of Fame in 2002, and was also made a life member of the Outrigger Canoe Club.
