= Tsamis =

Tsamis (Greek: Τσάμης) is a Greek surname. Notable people with that surname include:

- Angelos Tsamis (born 1981), Greek professional basketball player
- Dionysis Tsamis (1951–2026), Greek football player
- George Tsamis (born 1967), American baseball player, coach, and team manager
- Lazaros Tsamis (1878–1933), Aromanian revolutionary
- Mikes Tsamis (1895–unknown), Greek water polo player
