= Antonín Novotný (disambiguation) =

Antonín Novotný (1904–1975) was First Secretary of the Communist Party of Czechoslovakia 1953–1968 and president 1957–1968.

Antonín Novotný may also refer to:

- Antonín Novotný (actor) (1913–2005), Czech film actor
- Antonín Novotný (chess composer) (1827–1871), Czech chess composer and lawyer
- Antonín Novotný (water polo), Czech Olympic water polo player in 1920
