= Bergvall system =

Knockout tournament system

The Bergvall system was a variation of the traditional knockout tournament system.

It was used at the 1912, 1920 and 1924 Summer Olympics after being devised by Erik Bergvall, a Swedish water polo player, journalist and sports official who wanted to improve on the traditional knockout method used in Olympic competitions.

Believing that the traditional knockout system was only fair in deciding the gold medal winner, Bergvall advocated that separate competitions should also be held for the silver and bronze medals.

Bergvall also believed that teams knocked out in the early rounds of the main gold medal tournament should be given a second chance: all the teams knocked out by the gold medal winner, including the losing finalist, should compete in another knockout competition for the silver medal, then all the teams knocked out by the gold and silver medallists would compete in a third competition for the bronze.

At the 1912, 1920 and 1924 Games, the Bergvall system was used to decide the water polo tournaments, while at the 1920 Games it was also used for the football, ice hockey and tug of war tournaments.

Although the system is fair, there are two intrinsic flaws: firstly, the gold medal final is held in the middle of the tournament, instead of at the end, and secondly, defeated competitors have to remain ready to compete if those who lost to them are to have any chance of winning a medal.

Because of these flaws, the system was dropped by Olympic organisers after the 1924 Olympics, and was abandoned by the NCAA in 1931.

== Example 1 ==
=== Gold medal round ===
First round
Great Britain	2
United States	0

Semifinals
Great Britain	2
Belgium	0
Netherlands	2
Italy	0

Final
Great Britain	2
Netherlands	0

=== Silver medal round ===
First round		Final
Belgium	2
United States	0	Belgium	0
		Netherlands	2

=== Bronze medal round ===
First round		Final
United States	2
Italy	0	United States	0
		Belgium	2

== Example 2 ==
=== Gold medal round ===
First round
Spain	1
Italy	1 (Note: Italy forfeited the match in extra time.)
Belgium	11
Switzerland	0
Sweden	11
Czechoslovakia	0
Brazil	5
France	1

Quarterfinals
Great Britain	9
Spain	0
United States	7
Greece	0
Belgium	2
Netherlands	1
Sweden	7
Brazil	3

Semifinals
Great Britain	7
United States	2
Belgium	5
Sweden	3

Final
Great Britain	3
Belgium	2

=== Silver medal round ===
First round		Final
United States	5
Spain	0	United States	2
		Belgium	7

=== Bronze medal round ===
First round
Netherlands	7
Czechoslovakia	0
Greece	5
Italy	1

Semifinals
Sweden	9
Netherlands	1
United States	7
Greece	0

Final
Sweden	5
United States	0
