= Pouilley =

Pouilley may refer to

Places

- Pouilley-Français, commune in eastern France
- Pouilley-les-Vignes, commune in eastern France

Surname

- Georges Pouilley, French swimmer
