= Helen Moses =

American swimmer

Helen Olney Moses Cassidy
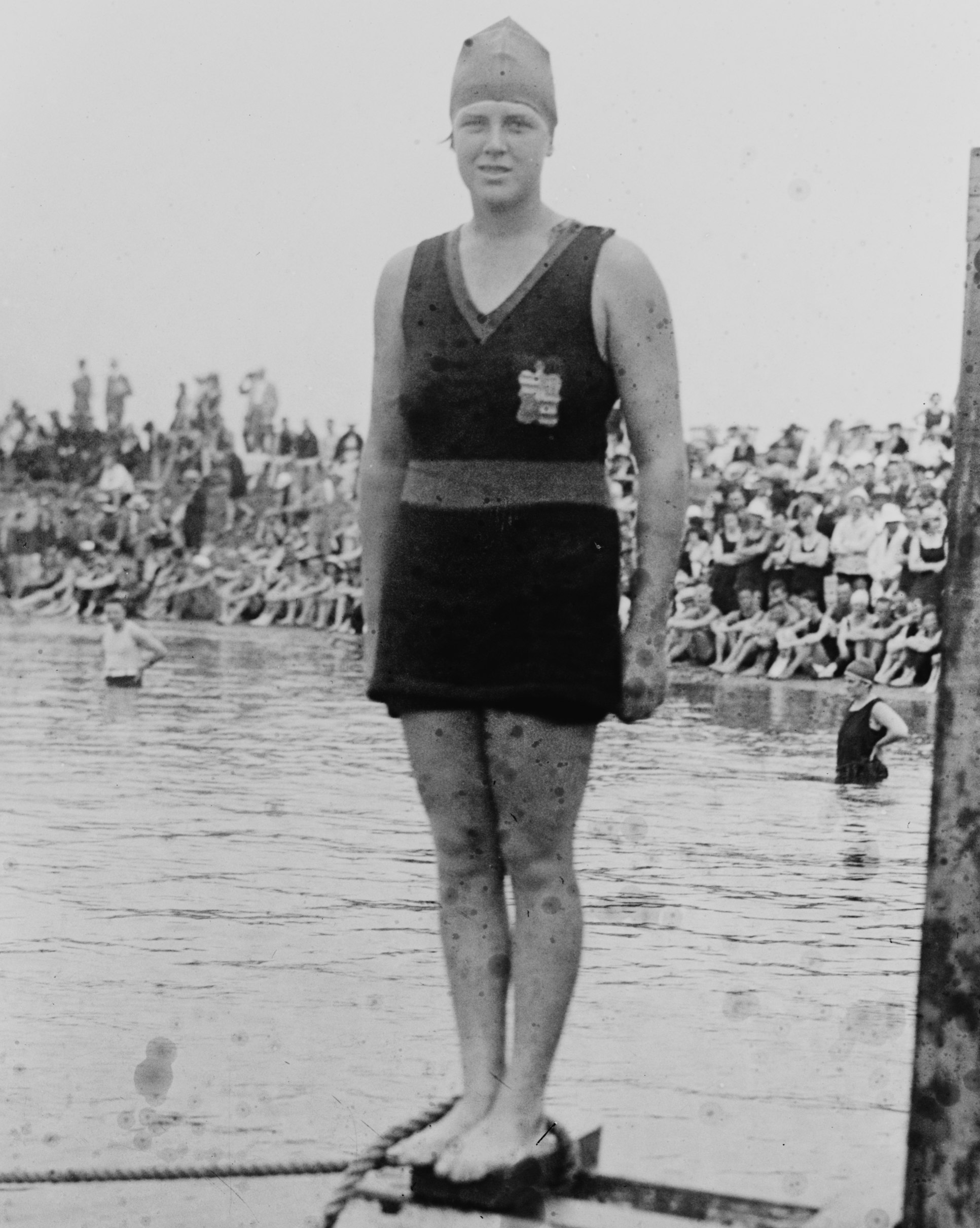

Personal information
- Born: 6 July 1905
- Died: 8 April 1985 (aged 79) Honolulu, Hawaii, United States

Sport
- Country: United States
- Sport: Swimming
- Club: Outrigger Canoe Club
- Coached by: George "Dad" Center

Helen Moses Cassidy (July 6, 1905 – April 8, 1985) was an American swimmer. She was an alternate swimmer in the women's relay team at the 1920 Summer Olympics.

== Early swimming ==
Moses began swimming in Coconut Island, then was trained by Hawaii Hall of Fame Coach George Center at the Outrigger Canoe Club in Honolulu beginning in 1919. In the early 1920's she was featured frequently in press coverage for her performances in swim meets in Honolulu. In March, 1921, swimming for the Outrigger Canoe Club, at a city-wide meet at the YMCA in Honolulu, Moses finished second in the 100-yard event behind Mariechen Wehselau, and first in the 160-yard relay with Outrigger members Helen Vernon, Estelle Cassidy, and Mariechen Wehselau setting a new record of 1:30.2.

At the Women's Swim tournament at the Punahou Pool in April, 2022, Moses placed a close second for the 50-yard breaststroke to Mariechen Wehselau, and placed second to Wehselau in the Century Open. Moses placed first in springboard diving and broke the island plunge record three times with a final distance of 54 feet, 10.5 inches. Known as a Plunge for distance, the event recorded the distance from the starting point a swimmer could reach after a dive from 18 inches above the surface, and became a competitive event as it encouraged swimming competitors to become more efficient in their dive starts in races.

== 1920 Antwerp Olympic trials ==
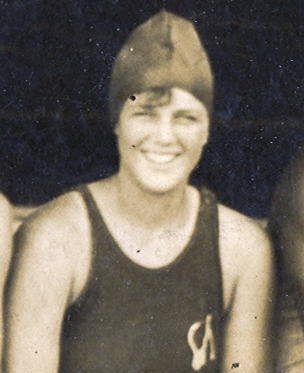
Helen Moses in 1920

Helen, as a Punahou Freshman at only 14, was just beginning her swimming career at Punahou when she was chosen to try out for the 1920 Olympics. She was the only woman chosen to be part of the Hawaiian contingent for the 1920 Olympic swimming trials in San Francisco, California. She progressed to the final U.S. women's Olympic trials in New York.

Although she did not place first in her races, she swam personal best times and so impressed the judges that they selected her as a member of the U.S. women’s swimming team as an alternate on the relay team.

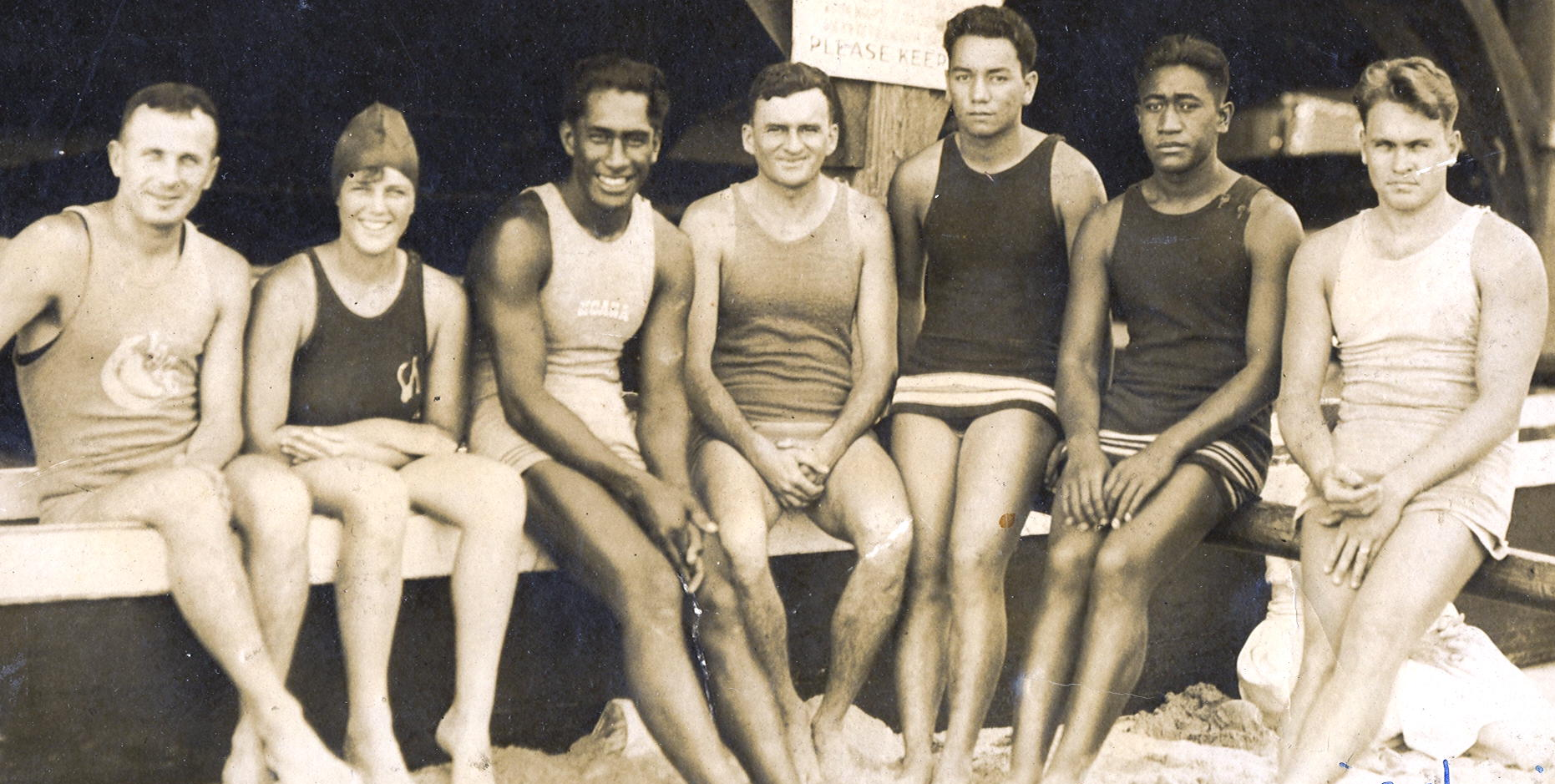
Hawaiian Team selected for 1920 Olympic try-outs

Hawaiians who qualified for the 1920 Olympic try-outs shown left to right: Ludy Langer, Helen Moses, Duke Kahanamoku, George "Dad" Center, Warren Kealoha, Pua Kealoha, and Bill Harris. Her coach at the Outrigger Club, George Center, would also serve as an Assistant swimming coach in the 1920 Antwerp Olympics.

The first round of the 1920 Olympic trials were on June 27, 1920 at Neptune Beach in San Francisco.

During her swimming career she won top honors in the annual Thurston Meet in 1922, as the open champion and team captain.

== Honors ==
In 1920 Helen received a life membership in the Outrigger Club as an honor, perhaps partly in tribute to selection as an Olympic candidate. In additional recognition, she was inducted into the Hawaii Swimming Hall of Fame in 2002.

Moses graduated from the Punahou School in 1924. After High School graduation, she pursued studies for a year and a half at the University of Hawaii, then worked at the University's registrar's office prior to her marriage. She married Charles E. Cassidy in 1930 and had a daughter. After graduating Punahou, she continued to help with the training of Punahou’s swimmers and from 1935 to 1937 served as swimming coach for the Punahou’s girls team. After retiring in 1973, she moved to Kamuela in Waimea on the Big Island near to her old swimming friend, Mariechen.

She died April 8, 1985, and was buried in Oahu Cemetery in Honolulu with her husband Charles who pre-deceased her by 13 years, in 1972.
