= Jorio =

Jorio, De Jorio and Di Jorio are Italian surnames, and may refer to:

- Alberto di Jorio (1884–1979), Italian Roman Catholic cardinal
- Andrea De Jorio (1769–1851), Italian antiquarian
- Domenico Jorio (1867–1954), Italian Roman Catholic cardinal
- Francesco Di Jorio (born 1973), Swiss former footballer
- João Jório, Brazilian rower
- Maurizio De Jorio (born 1967), Italian singer

== See also ==
- Iorio, another surname
