= Luiz da Silva =

Luiz da Silva may refer to:

- Luiz da Silva (water polo) (born 1903), Brazilian water polo player
- Luiz Inácio Lula da Silva (born 1945), 35th & 39th President of Brazil
- Luiz da Silva (boxer) in 2019 AIBA World Boxing Championships – Welterweight
- Beto da Silva (born 1996), Peruvian footballer
- Luiz Maurício da Silva (born 2000), Brazilian javelin thrower

== See also ==
- Luís da Silva (born 1946), Brazilian sprinter
- Luis Da Silva (born 1982), American actor, basketball player, author, and producer
