= Cernik =

Cernik may refer to:

- Cernik, Brod-Posavina County, a village in Croatia
- Cernik, Primorje-Gorski Kotar County, a village near Čavle, Croatia
- Cernik, Zagreb County, a village in Žumberak, Croatia
- Černík, Slovakia, a municipality and village in Slovakia
- Černík (surname), Czech surname

== See also ==
- Cerna (disambiguation)
