= Vinicius Antonelli =

Brazilian water polo player

Personal information
- Born: 1 March 1990 (age 36)
- Height: 182 cm (6 ft 0 in)
- Weight: 88 kg (194 lb)

Sport
- Sport: Water polo
- Club: Pinheiros
Medal record
Representing Brazil
Pan American Games
Silver medal – second place	2015 Toronto	Team

Vinicius Antonelli (born 1 March 1990) is a water polo player from Brazil. He was part of the Brazilian team at the 2016 Summer Olympics, where the team was eliminated in the quarterfinals.

== See also ==
- Brazil men's Olympic water polo team records and statistics
- List of men's Olympic water polo tournament goalkeepers
