= Charles Horner =

Charles Horner may refer to:

- Charles Horner (jeweller) (1837–1896), English jeweller
- Charles Horner (cricketer) (1857–1925), English cricketer
- Chuck Horner (born 1936), retired USAF general
- Charles Horner (diplomat) (born 1943), U.S. diplomat
- Charles T. Horner Jr. (1916–1992), U.S. Army officer

== See also ==
- Charles Horn (disambiguation)
- Charles Horne (disambiguation)
