= Iorio =

Iorio is an Italian surname (original a given name derived from Giorgio). Notable people with the surname include:

- Átila Iório (1921–2002), Brazilian actor
- Matt Iorio (fl. 2003–present), American rally driver
- Maurizio Iorio (born 1959), Italian retired footballer
- Mike Iorio (born 1964), American professional wrestler under the ring name Big Guido
- Nicola Di Iorio (fl. 2015–present), Canadian politician
- Pam Iorio (born 1959), American mayor of Tampa, Florida, and author
- Ricardo Iorio (1962–2023), Argentine heavy metal musician
- Salomé di Iorio (born 1980), Argentine football referee
- Sam Iorio (born 1998), American-Israeli basketball player in the Israeli Basketball Premier League
- Vincent Iorio (born 2002), Canadian ice hockey player

== See also ==
- La figlia di Iorio
- Jorio, another surname
