= Henrique Melmann =

Brazilian water polo player (1931–2021)

Personal information
- Born: 24 April 1931; Recife, Brazil
- Died: 1 June 2021 (aged 90)

Sport
- Sport: Water polo

Henrique Melmann (24 April 1931 – 1 June 2021) was a Brazilian water polo player. He competed in the men's tournament at the 1952 Summer Olympics. Melmann died on 1 June 2021, at the age of 90.

== See also ==
- Brazil men's Olympic water polo team records and statistics
- List of men's Olympic water polo tournament goalkeepers
