= Ko Korsten =

Dutch swimmer

Personal information
- Nationality: Dutch
- Born: 2 May 1895 Amsterdam, Netherlands
- Died: 3 October 1981 (aged 86) Heemstede, Netherlands

Sport
- Sport: Swimming

Ko Korsten (2 May 1895 – 3 October 1981) was a Dutch swimmer. He competed in the men's 100 metre freestyle event at the 1920 Summer Olympics. His time in the semi-finals (1.05.2) was the best among European competitors. However, it was not good enough to make the final.
