= Charles Horne =

Charles Horne may refer to:

- Charles Silvester Horne (1865–1914), British Congregationalist minister and politician
- Charles Francis Horne (1870–1942), American author

== See also ==
- Charles Van Horne (1921–2003), politician in New Brunswick, Canada
- Charles Horn (disambiguation)
- Charles Horner (disambiguation)
