= Lucio Figueirêdo =

Brazilian water polo player (1927–2003)

Personal information
- Full name: Lúcio da Cunha Figueirêdo
- Nationality: Brazilian
- Born: 15 September 1927
- Died: 21 December 2003 (aged 76) Rio de Janeiro, Brazil

Sport
- Sport: Water polo

Lúcio da Cunha Figueirêdo (15 September 1927 – 21 December 2003) was a Brazilian water polo player. He competed in the men's tournament at the 1952 Summer Olympics. Figueirêdo died in Rio de Janeiro on 21 December 2003, at the age of 76.

== See also ==
- Brazil men's Olympic water polo team records and statistics
- List of men's Olympic water polo tournament goalkeepers
