= Agostino Frassinetti =

Italian swimmer (1897–1967)

Personal information
- Born: 20 October 1897 Genoa, Italy
- Died: 16 March 1967 (aged 69) Sampierdarena, Italy

Sport
- Sport: Swimming

Agostino Frassinetti (20 October 1897 – 16 March 1967) was an Italian freestyle swimmer who competed in the 1920 Summer Olympics and in the 1924 Summer Olympics. He was born in Genoa. In 1920, he was a member of the Italian relay team, which finished fifth in the 4 x 200 metre freestyle relay competition. In the 100 metre freestyle event, he was eliminated in the semi-finals. Four years later, at the Paris Games, he was eliminated with the Italian relay team in the semi-finals of the 4 x 200 metre freestyle relay contest.
