= Luiz Daniel =

Brazilian water polo player

Personal information
- Born: 29 September 1936 (age 89) São Paulo, Brazil

Sport
- Sport: Water polo
Medal record
Men's water polo
Representing Brazil
Pan American Games
Gold medal – first place	1963 São Paulo	Team competition
Bronze medal – third place	1959 Chicago	Team competition

Luiz Daniel (born 29 September 1936) is a Brazilian water polo player. He competed at the 1960 Summer Olympics and the 1964 Summer Olympics. Daniel was also a member of Brazil's bronze medal winning team at the 1959 Pan American Games and the gold medal winning team at the 1963 Pan American Games.

== See also ==
- Brazil men's Olympic water polo team records and statistics
- List of men's Olympic water polo tournament goalkeepers
