= Léon Pesch =

Luxembourgish swimmer

Personal information
- Full name: Léon Pesch

Sport
- Sport: Swimming

Léon Pesch was a Luxembourgish swimmer. He competed in the men's 100 metre freestyle event at the 1920 Summer Olympics.
