= Jan Peka =

Czech ice hockey player

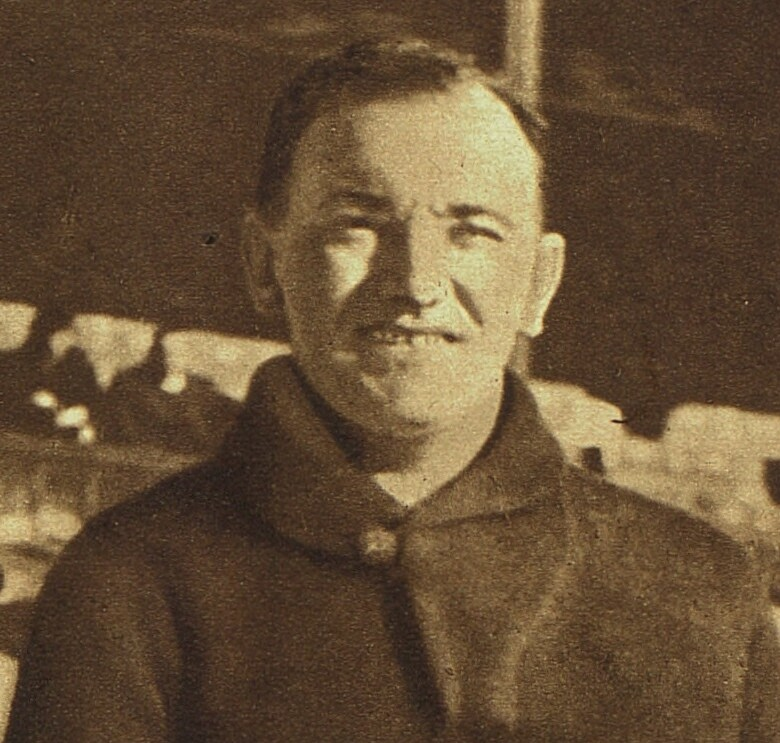
- Born: 27 July 1894 Rataje nad Sázavou, Austria-Hungary
- Died: 21 January 1985 (aged 90) Prague, Czechoslovakia
- Position: Goaltender
- Caught: Left
- National team: Czechoslovakia
- Playing career: 1912–1936
Medal record
Olympic Games
Bronze medal – third place	1920 Antwerp	Team

Jan Peka (27 July 1894 – 21 January 1985) was a Czech ice hockey player, representing Czechoslovakia. He competed in the 1920 Summer Olympics, the 1928 Winter Olympics, and at the 1936 Winter Olympics.

Born in Rataje nad Sázavou, Austria-Hungary, Peka fought in the First World War and was captured, becoming a prisoner of war in Greece. He did not return home until 1919. He was also a member of the Czechoslovakia national team which won the bronze medal at the 1920 Summer Olympics, where ice hockey was first played. The original goaltender for the team, Karel Wälzer, broke his thumb before the start of the tournament, and was unable to play the first two games. Peka was brought in to play against Canada and the United States, losing each game by a score of 15–0 and 16–0, respectively. Wälzer returned for the final match against Sweden, winning it and ensuring the Czechoslovaks won bronze.

He also participated in the 1928 ice hockey tournament and in the 1936 ice hockey tournament.
