= Roberto Borelli =

Brazilian water polo player

Personal information
- Born: 3 December 1963 (age 61); São Paulo, Brazil

Sport
- Sport: Water polo

Roberto Borelli (born 3 December 1963) is a Brazilian water polo player. He competed in the men's tournament at the 1984 Summer Olympics.

== See also ==
- Brazil men's Olympic water polo team records and statistics
- List of men's Olympic water polo tournament goalkeepers
