= Antonio Vila-Coro =

Spanish water polo player (1895–1977)

Personal information
- Full name: Antonio Vila-Coro Nadal
- Nationality: Spanish
- Born: 12 July 1895; Madrid, Spain
- Died: 13 January 1977 (aged 81); Barcelona, Spain

Sport
- Sport: Water polo

Antonio Vila-Coro Nadal (12 July 1895 – 13 January 1977) was a Spanish water polo player. He competed in the men's tournament at the 1920 Summer Olympics.
