= Raymond Bracken =

American sport shooter

Personal information
- Born: January 8, 1891 Steubenville, Ohio, United States
- Died: October 23, 1974 (aged 83) Columbus, Ohio, United States

Sport
- Sport: Sports shooting
Medal record
Men's shooting
Representing United States
Olympic Games
Gold medal – first place	1920 Antwerp	Team 50 m free pistol
Silver medal – second place	1920 Antwerp	30 m military pistol

Raymond Cope Bracken (January 8, 1891 – October 23, 1974) was an American sport shooter who competed in the 1920 Summer Olympics.

He was born in Steubenville, Ohio and died in Columbus, Ohio. Coached by James H. Snook, Bracken made his debut by winning the 1917 United States Revolver Association National Championship Pistol Novice Match. In 1920, along with his coach, he won the gold medal as a member of the American team in the team 50 metre free pistol competition, and the silver medal in the individual 30 metre military pistol. He also participated in the individual 50 metre free pistol competition.

Bracken died in Columbus, Ohio, on October 23, 1974. He was 83 years old.
