= Albert Dickin =

British swimmer and diver

Personal information
- Full name: Albert Edward Dickin
- National team: Great Britain
- Born: 11 January 1901 Brentford, England
- Died: 5 May 1955 (aged 54) Birmingham, England

Sport
- Sport: Swimming
- Strokes: Freestyle
- Club: Polytechnic Swimming Club

Albert Edward Dickin (11 January 1901 – 5 May 1955) was a British freestyle swimmer and diver who competed in the 1920 Summer Olympics, 1924 Summer Olympics, and 1928 Summer Olympics.

In 1920, he was eliminated in the first round of the 100-metre freestyle event as well as of the plain high diving competition. Four years later, he finished fifth with the British team in the 4×200-metre freestyle relay. In the 100-metre freestyle event as well as the plain high diving competition, he was eliminated in the first round again. At the 1928 Games, he was a member of the British team that finished sixth in the 4×200-metre freestyle relay.

His brother Jack Dickin also swam the 100-metre freestyle event in the 1920 Summer Olympics.
