= Charles C. Horn =

American behavioral neuroscientist

Dr. Charles Christopher Horn (Charles C. Horn) is an American behavioral neuroscientist. His research focuses on the neurobiological basis of nausea and vomiting, and symptoms associated with cancer and cancer treatments. He was a faculty member at the Monell Chemical Senses Center, Philadelphia, United States. Currently his laboratory is at the University of Pittsburgh Cancer Institute and he is a faculty member in the Departments of Medicine (Division of Gastroenterology, Hepatology, and Nutrition) and Anesthesiology.
