= Marcel Hussaud =

French water polo player (1894–1960)

Personal information
- Nationality: French
- Born: 18 May 1894
- Died: 23 September 1960 (aged 66)

Sport
- Sport: Water polo

Marcel Hussaud (18 May 1894 – 23 September 1960) was a French water polo player. He competed in the men's tournament at the 1920 Summer Olympics.
