= Luiz da Silva (water polo) =

Brazilian water polo player

Personal information
- Born: 1903 Pernambuco, Brazil

Sport
- Sport: Water polo

Luiz da Silva (born 1903, date of death unknown) was a Brazilian water polo player. He competed in the men's tournament at the 1932 Summer Olympics.

== See also ==
- Brazil men's Olympic water polo team records and statistics
- List of men's Olympic water polo tournament goalkeepers
