= Václav Bucháček =

Czech swimmer (1901–1974)

Personal information
- Full name: Václav Bucháček
- Born: 2 June 1901 Prague, Austria-Hungary
- Died: 14 August 1974 (aged 73)

Sport
- Sport: Swimming

Václav Bucháček (2 June 1901 – 14 August 1974) was a Czech swimmer. He competed in the men's 100 metre freestyle event at the 1920 Summer Olympics.
