= Alfred Steen =

Norwegian swimmer

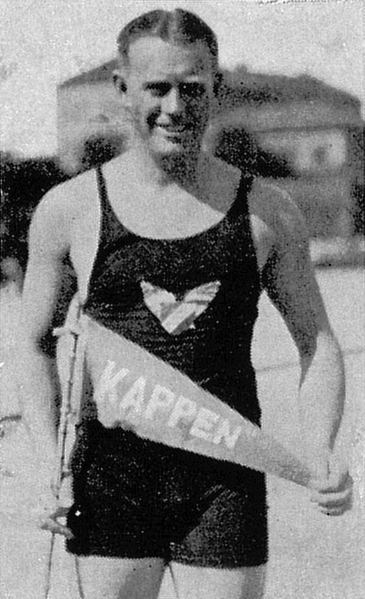
- Steen between 1919 and 1924.

Personal information
- Nationality: Norwegian
- Born: 10 June 1896; Brooklyn, United States
- Died: 4 March 1949 (aged 52); Tampa, Florida

Sport
- Sport: Swimming

Alfred Richard Steen (10 June 1896 – 4 March 1949) was a Norwegian freestyle swimmer. He was born in Brooklyn. He competed at the 1920 Summer Olympics in Antwerp. He won a total of sixteen gold medals at the Norwegian championships.
