= Afrânio da Costa =

Brazilian sport shooter (1892–1979)

Personal information
- Full name: Afrânio Antônio da Costa
- Born: 14 March 1892 Rio de Janeiro, Brazil
- Died: 26 June 1979 (aged 87) Rio de Janeiro, Brazil

Sport
- Sport: Sports shooting
Medal record
Men's shooting
Representing Brazil
Olympic Games
Silver medal – second place	1920 Antwerp	50 m free pistol
Bronze medal – third place	1920 Antwerp	team 50 m free pistol

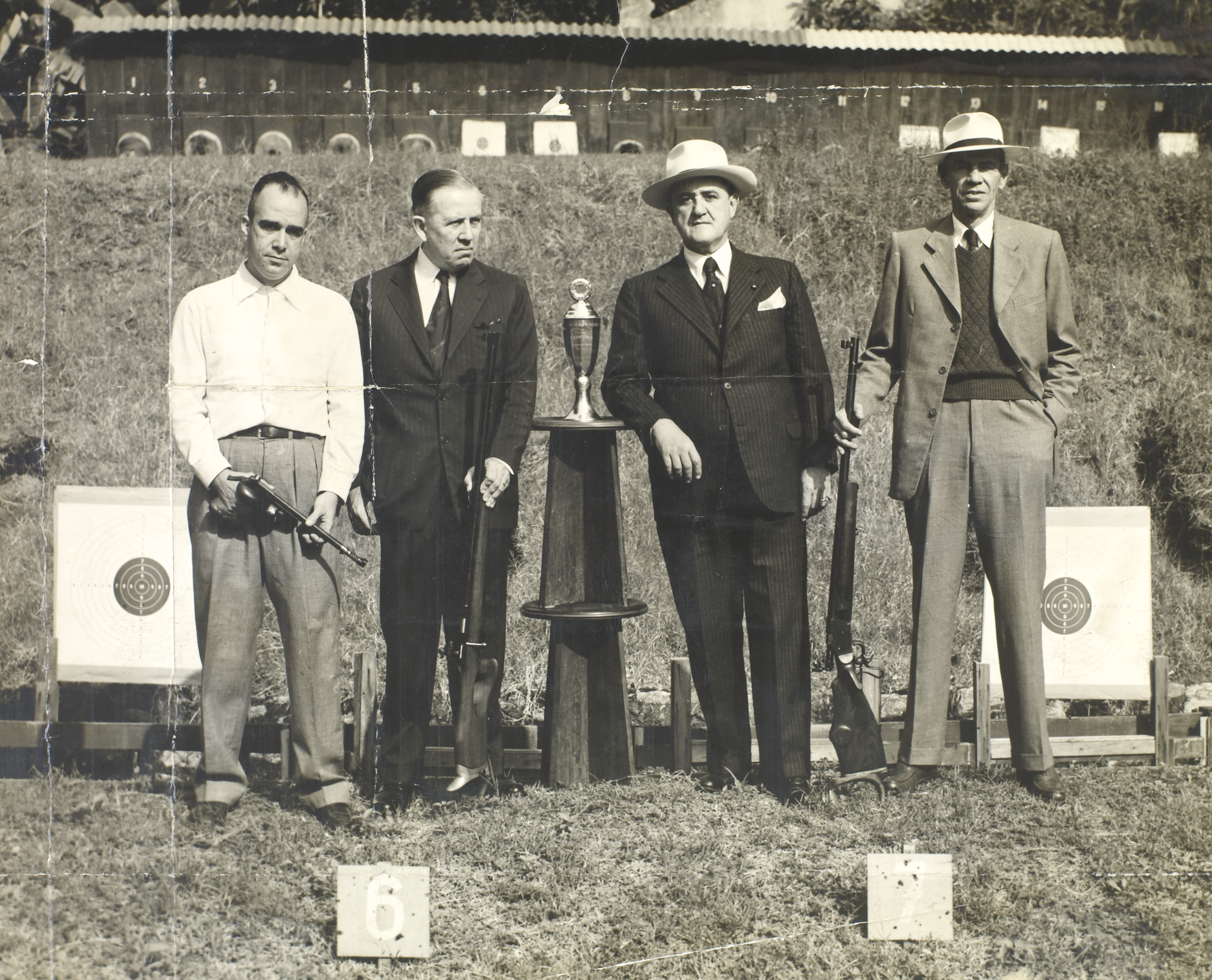
Ministro Afrânio Costa, Harvey Vellela, Adhaury Rocha and Salvador Trindade, Olympic shooters.tif

Afrânio Antônio da Costa (14 March 1892 – 26 June 1979) was a Brazilian sport shooter who competed in the 1920 Summer Olympics. He served as a judge of the Brazilian Federal Court of Appeals (TFR) between 1947 and 1962. He was born and died in Rio de Janeiro.

In 1920 he won the silver medal in the 50 metre free pistol event and the bronze medal with the Brazilian team in the team 50 metre free pistol competition. He was also part of the Brazilian team which finished fourth in the Shooting at the 1920 Summer Olympics – Men's 30 metre team military pistol|team 30 metre military pistol event.
