= Jack Dickin =

British swimmer

Personal information
- Full name: John Henry Laurence Dickin
- Nationality: British
- Born: 10 February 1899
- Died: 1966 (aged 66–67)

Sport
- Sport: Swimming

Jack Dickin (10 February 1899 – 1966) was a British swimmer. He competed in the men's 100 metre freestyle event at the 1920 Summer Olympics.

His brother is Albert Dickin.
