= Černík (surname) =

Černík (feminine: Černíková) in a Czech surname, derived from černý, i.e. 'black'. Surnames derived from the name of this colour usually referred to the wearer's appearance (dark hair, dark skin, etc.). Notable people with the surname include:

- František Černík (born 1953), Czech ice hockey player
- František Černík (water polo) (1900–1982), Czech water polo player
- Martin Černík (born 1976), Czech snowboarder
- Oldřich Černík (1921–1994), Czech politician, Prime Minister of Czechoslovakia in 1968–1970
- Vladimír Černík (1917–2002), Czech tennis player
