= Jean Jenni =

Swiss swimmer

Personal information
- Full name: Jean Jenni
- Nationality: Swiss
- Died: January 1954

Sport
- Sport: Swimming

Jean Jenni (died January 1954) was a Swiss swimmer. He competed in the men's 100 metre freestyle event and the water polo at the 1920 Summer Olympics.
