= René Laloux (tennis) =

Belgian tennis player

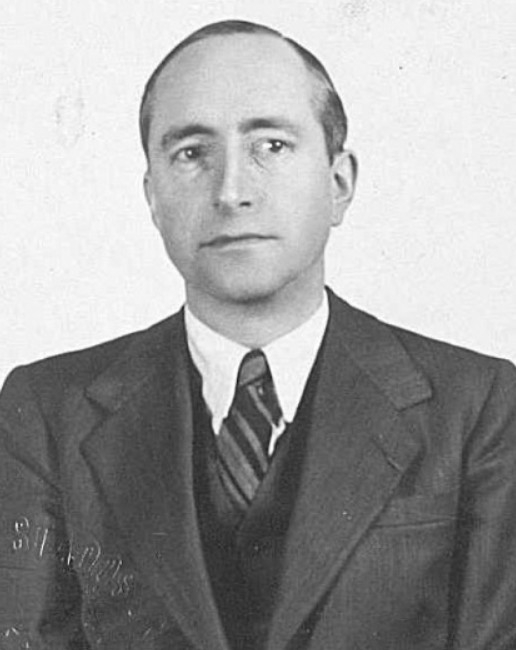

Personal information
- Nationality: Belgian
- Born: 19 January 1895
- Died: 22 November 1981 (aged 86)

Sport
- Sport: Tennis

René Laloux (19 January 1895 – 22 November 1981) was a Belgian tennis player. He competed in the men's doubles event at the 1920 Summer Olympics.
