= Hugo Sedláček =

Czech water polo player (1895–1952)

Personal information
- Nationality: Czech
- Born: 19 February 1895; Křivoklát, Austria-Hungary
- Died: 18 January 1952 (aged 56); Prague, Czechoslovakia

Sport
- Sport: Water polo

Hugo Sedláček (19 February 1895 – 18 January 1952) was a Czech water polo player. He competed in the men's tournament at the 1920 Summer Olympics.
