= Václav Lancinger =

Czech water polo player

Personal information
- Nationality: Czech
- Born: 4 May 1896; Prague, Czechoslovakia

Sport
- Sport: Water polo

Václav Lancinger (born 4 May 1896; date of death unknown) was a Czech water polo player. He competed in the men's tournament at the 1920 Summer Olympics.
