= Černík, Slovakia =

Černík Csornok
- Municipality
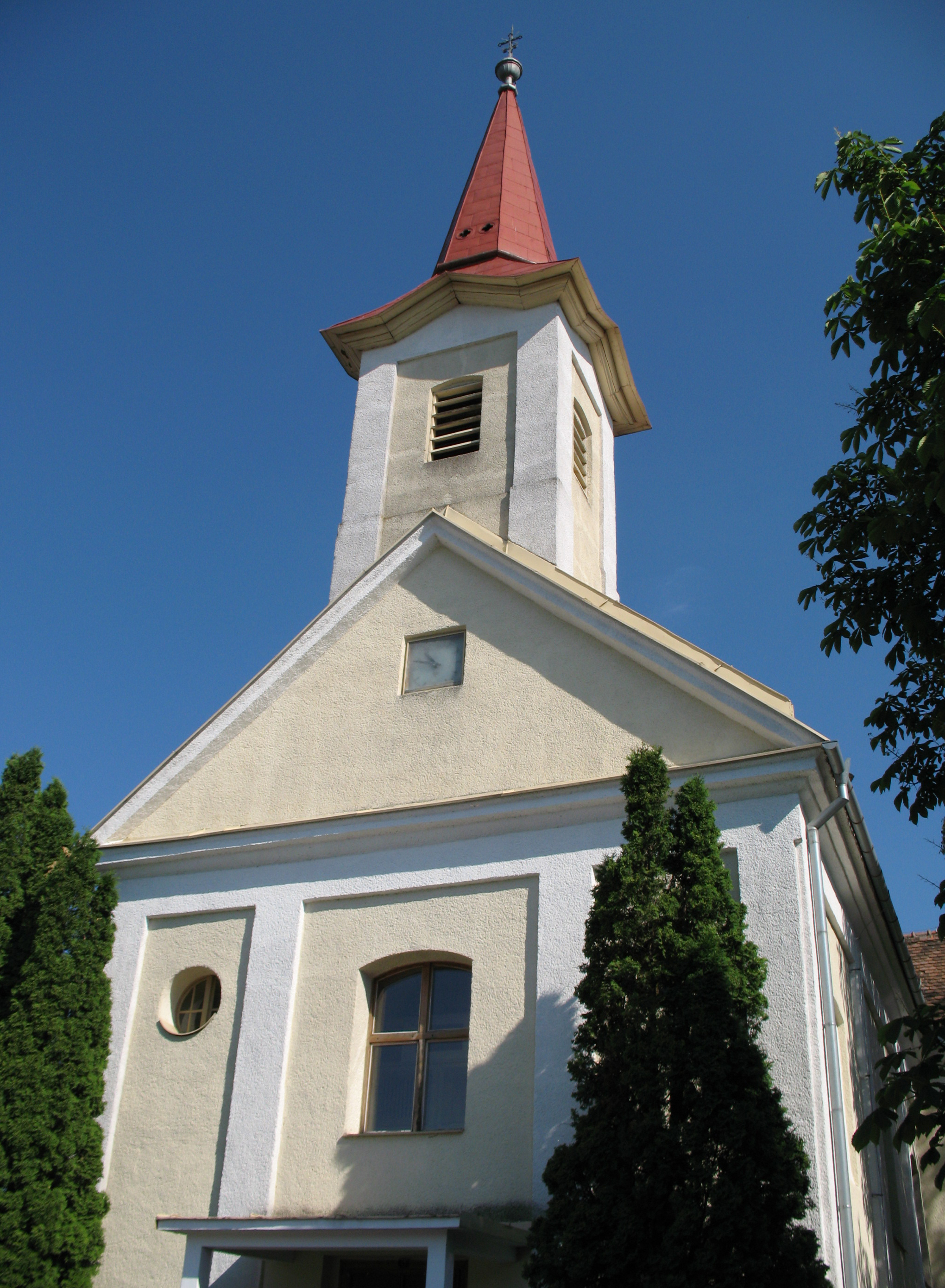

- Flag

- Location of Černík in the Nitra Region Location of Černík in Slovakia
- Coordinates: 48.15°N 18.23°E
- Country: Slovakia
- Region: Nitra Region
- District: Nové Zámky District
- First mentioned: 1156

Area
  - Total: 13.38 km^{2} (5.17 sq mi)
- Elevation: 126 m (413 ft)

Population (2025)
  - Total: 1,085
- Time zone: UTC+1 (CET)
  - Summer (DST): UTC+2 (CEST)
- Postal code: 941 05
- Area code: +421 35
- Vehicle registration plate (until 2022): NZ
- Website: www.obeccernik.sk

Černík (Hungarian: Csornok) is a village and municipality in the Nové Zámky District in the Nitra Region of south-west Slovakia.

== History ==
The village was first mentioned in historical records in 1156.

== Geography ==
The municipality lies at an altitude of 126 metres (413 ft) and covers an area of 13.38 km^{2} (5.17 sq mi) (2025).

== Population ==
Population statistic (10 years)
Year	1995	2005	2015	2025
Count	1012	1002	1040	1085
Difference		−0.98%	+3.79%	+4.32%

Population statistic
Year	2024	2025
Count	1058	1085
Difference		+2.55%

It has a population of 1085 people (31 December 2025).

=== Ethnicity ===
Census 2021 (1+ %)
Ethnicity	Number	Fraction
Slovak	975	93.03%
Not found out	64	6.1%
Total	1048	

In year 2021 was 1048 people by ethnicity 975 as Slovak, 64 as Not found out, 9 as Czech, 8 as Hungarian, 2 as Russian, 2 as Other, 1 as Romani, 1 as Rusyn, 1 as German and 1 as English.

Note on population: The difference values of population numbers in the table "Population statistic" and in the sections "Ethnicity" & "Religion" is caused by the use of various statistical methods.

=== Religion ===
Census 2021 (1+ %)
Religion	Number	Fraction
Roman Catholic Church	834	79.58%
None	132	12.6%
Not found out	59	5.63%
Total	1048	

In year 2021 was 1048 people by religion 834 from Roman Catholic Church, 132 from None, 59 from Not found out, 6 from Evangelical Church, 5 from Calvinist Church, 3 from Christian Congregations in Slovakia, 3 from Greek Catholic Church, 2 from Eastern Orthodox Church, 2 from Ad hoc movements, 1 from Paganism and natural spirituality and 1 from Other.

== Facilities ==
The village has a small public library a gym and football pitch.

== Genealogical resources ==
The records for genealogical research are available at the state archive "Statny Archiv in Nitra, Slovakia"

- Roman Catholic church records (births/marriages/deaths): 1709-1918 (parish B)
- Lutheran church records (births/marriages/deaths): 1785-1896 (parish B)

== See also ==
- List of municipalities and towns in Slovakia
