= Georges Pouilley =

French swimmer (1893–1958)

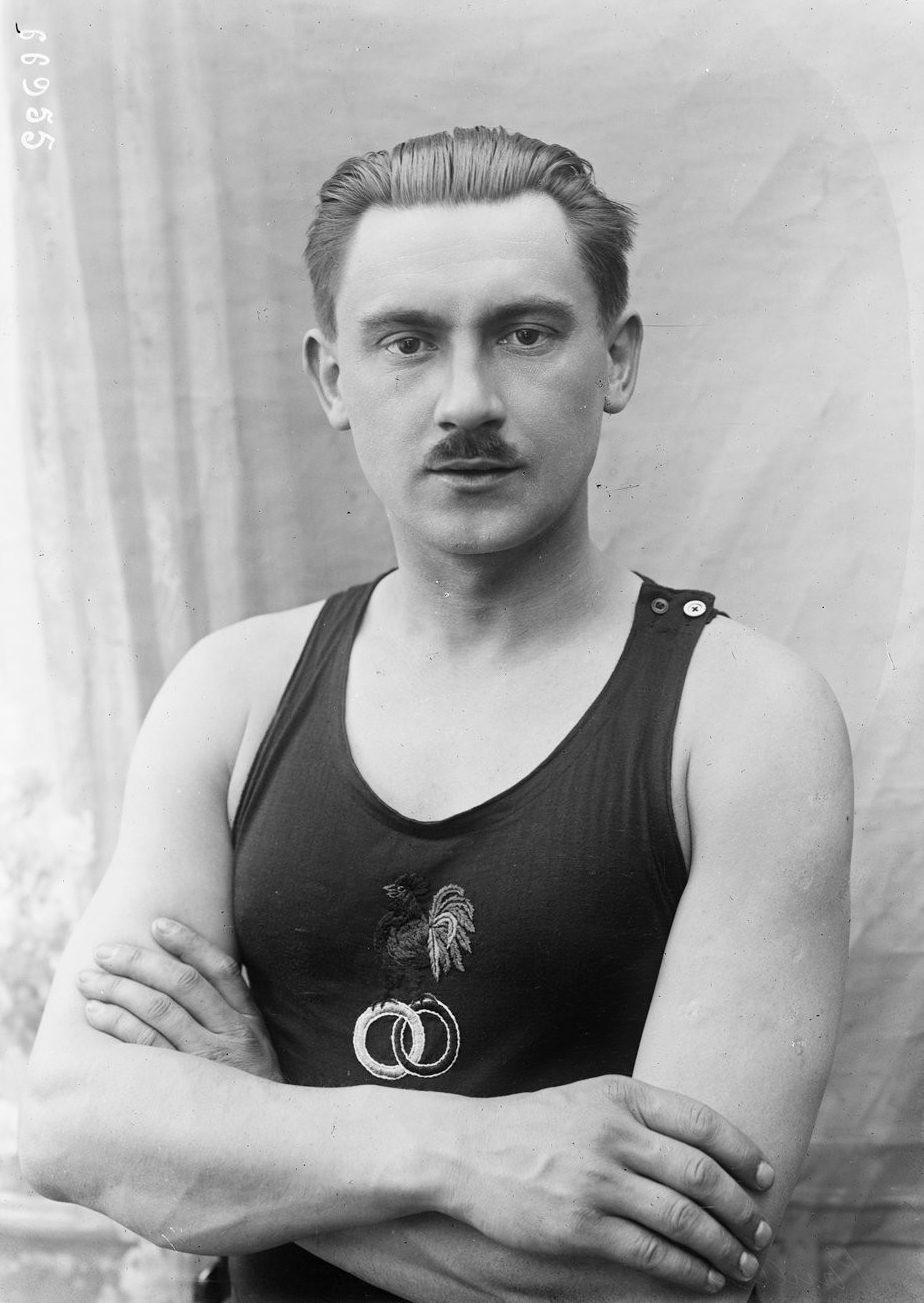
- Georges Pouilley in 1921

Personal information
- Born: 23 July 1893
- Died: 12 January 1958 (aged 64)

Sport
- Sport: Swimming
- Club: CN Paris

Georges Pouilley (23 July 1893 – 12 January 1958) was a French freestyle swimmer. He competed at the 1920 Summer Olympics in the 100 m and 4 × 200 m, but failed to reach the finals. He later became an aviator.
