= Mário Maurity =

Brazilian sports shooter

Personal information
- Born: 31 July 1883; Rio de Janeiro, Brazil
- Died: 11 October 1922 (aged 39)

Sport
- Sport: Sports shooting

Mário Maurity (31 July 1883 – 11 October 1922) was a Brazilian sports shooter. He competed in two events at the 1920 Summer Olympics.
