= Charles Horn (water polo) =

Swiss water polo player

Personal information
- Nationality: Swiss

Sport
- Sport: Water polo

Charles Horn was a Swiss water polo player. He competed in the men's tournament at the 1920 Summer Olympics.
