= Emil Cirl =

Czech water polo player

Personal information
- Nationality: Czech
- Born: 4 February 1900; Prague, Czechoslovakia

Sport
- Sport: Water polo

Emil Cirl (born 4 February 1900 – date of death unknown) was a Czech water polo player. He competed in the men's tournament at the 1920 Summer Olympics.
