= Edgard Leite =

Brazilian water polo player

Personal information
- Born: 22 March 1889; Rio de Janeiro, Brazil
- Died: 9 September 1974 (aged 85); Rio de Janeiro, Brazil

Sport
- Sport: Water polo

Edgard Leite (22 March 1889 – 9 September 1974) was a Brazilian water polo player. He competed in the men's tournament at the 1920 Summer Olympics.
