= Pua Kealoha =

American swimmer (1902–1989)

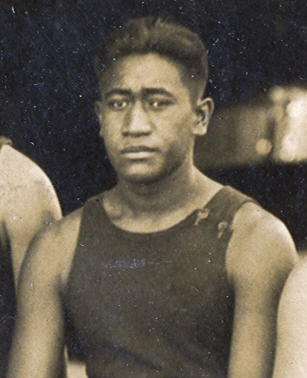
- Pua Kealoha in 1920 Hawaii before Olympic tryouts

Personal information
- Full name: Pua Kele Kealoha
- National team: United States
- Born: November 14, 1902 Waialua, Territory of Hawaii, U.S.
- Died: August 29, 1989 (aged 86) San Francisco, California, U.S.
- Occupations: Swim athlete, musician, movie extra
- Height: Around 6 ft 0 in (1.83 m) or more
- Weight: Around 175 lb (79 kg)

Sport
- Sport: Swimming
- Strokes: Freestyle
- Club: Hui Makami Club
- College team: St. Louis School, Honolulu
- Coach: Harvey Chilton (Hui Makami)
Medal record
Men's swimming
Representing the United States
Olympic Games
Gold medal – first place	1920 Antwerp	4x200 m freestyle relay
Silver medal – second place	1920 Antwerp	100 m freestyle

Pua Kele Kealoha (November 14, 1902 – August 29, 1989) was a Hawaiian-American competition swimmer, a 1920 Antwerp Olympic champion in the 4x200 freestyle relay, and a former world record-holder. After retiring as a swimmer, he made a living as a musician, starting his own band "Pua Kealoha and his Hawaiian Trio", which performed at the well-known Royal Hawaiian Hotel in 1927 and was featured daily in the late 1930's in California's Lake Arrowhead Resort. He later worked as a musician travelling the world while on Matson cruiseliners, which travelled to Pacific destinations that included Honolulu, Fiji, New Zealand, Australia, and Samoa.

== Early life and swimming ==
Pua was born November 14, 1902, in coastal Waialua, Hawaii. A close friend, Joe Akana, believed Kealoha grew up in the Kalihi neighborhood of greater Honolulu, 25 miles Southeast and inland of his commonly cited birthplace Waialua, and learned to swim in the pool at Honolulu's nearby Palama Settlement. The Palama Settlement area had a social service agency established in the 19th century for the neighborhood of Kalihi that that included a community pool that may have offered free swimming instruction to local residents when Pua was a youth. Legend has it that, Kealoha made extra money as a youth diving for coins in Honolulu Harbor. Though he excelled in swimming in High School, he was a multi-sport athlete at Honolulu's Kamehameha Schools, likely at or near the current Kapalama Campus. Kealoha attended and swam for the St. Louis School in Honolulu, benefitting from tuition provided by a Montana businessman who owned copper mines. The St. Louis School sport's teams which included water polo and swimming were popular and closely followed throughout greater Honolulu.

As he evolved as a swimmer, Kealoha trained and competed with the strong swim program provided by the Hui Makani Club in greater Honolulu. Kealoha's Coach at Hui Makani, Harvey Chilton, a 2015 Hawaii Sports Hall of Fame inductee, coached both the well-known Hui Makani and Hui Nalu Swim Clubs during his accomplished career as a coach which spanned over forty years. Kealoha may have done some of his early training in Honolulu Harbor, but large pools such as the Punahou School "tank" pool, the Elizabeth Waterhouse Memorial Tank opened in 1922, and the Waikīkī War Memorial Natatorium opened in 1927, were available in greater Honolulu for training and swim meets. Though few records of Kealoha's height remain, a 1930's era photo of Kealoha with entertainer Eddie Cantor, who was 5' 8" tall, shows Kealoha around 4-5 inches taller, around 6' 0" or more. Kealoha's post-peak swimming weight was listed as around 175 pounds.

== 1920 Antwerp Olympic medals ==
Kealoha represented the United States at the August, 1920 Summer Olympics in Antwerp, Belgium as a 17-year-old. As many as eight Hawaiians made the U.S. Olympic team that year. Kealoha won a gold medal as a member of the winning U.S. team in the men's 4×200-meter freestyle relay with teammates Perry McGillivray, Norman Ross and Hawaiian champion Duke Kahanamoku. The U.S. relay team set a new Olympic and world record of 10:04.4 in the event final.

Individually, Kealoha also received a silver medal in the 1920 Olympics for his second-place performance in the men's 100-meter freestyle with a time of 1:02.6 finishing second to Hawaiian Champion Duke Kahanamoku.

Pua represented Honolulu's Saint Louis College in 1923, when he swam the 50-yard freestyle in 24 seconds flat to set the Yale Interscholastic Swimming Meet Record, a record that held for 24 years. St. Louis College was an all-boys Catholic prep school in Honolulu's St. Louis Heights.

In the 1924 Olympic swimming trials in Chicago, Pua finished second in the preliminary heats but fifth in the final of 100-meter freestyle, and did not make the U.S. Olympic team, requiring a third place to qualify. Pua was likely beaten in the 100 meter Olympic trial finals by Johnny Weissmuller and the Kahanamoku brothers Sam and Duke who would later earn medals in the event in the 1924 Olympics.

in 1962, Kealoha became a member of the Outrigger Canoe Club, though he did not train with the club, nor represent them during his swimming career.

According to a member of the Kahanamoku family who knew him, Kealoha was the only person to swim unassisted from Molokai to Oahu. He had previously tried to swim from Oahu to Molokai but failed due to the headwind, current, and waves.

=== Honors ===
Kealoha was an inductee to the Hawaii Sports Hall of Fame in 1998, and the Hawaii Swimming Hall of Fame in 2002.

== Later life and careers ==
After his swimming career, Kealoah earned his living as a musician, performing with other "beachboy" musicians, and had his own band, "Pua Kealoha and his Hawaiian Trio". His band performed Hawaiian music, featured Hula Dancing, was accompanied by ukelele, woodwinds, steel and acoustic guitars. The band played and often sang melees, Hawaiian songs and poems. His six piece Hawaiian orchestra performed for the opening of Honolulu's famed Royal Hawaiian Hotel in February, 1927. Kealoha composed the work "Bucking Horse Hula", which was later recorded by the Hawaiian band "Chick Daniels and the Royal Hawaiians". Daniels, an inductee of the Hawaiian Music Hall of Fame, had a Hawaiian band that performed nights at Waikiki's Royal Hawaiian Hotel.

=== Hotel and cruise line musician ===
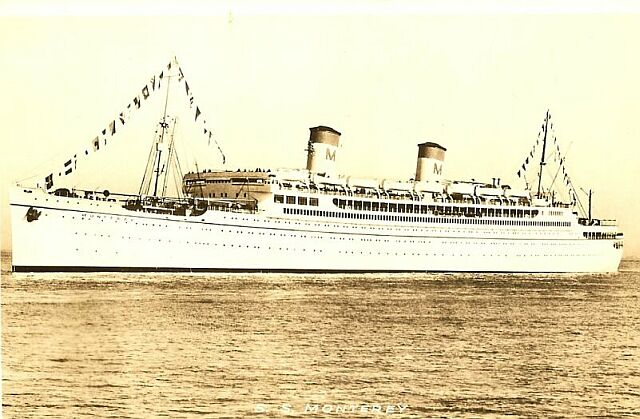
Matson Line's Matsonia, 1931

When the Arrowhead Lake Resort in Lake Arrowhead, California, hired his band to perform around 1935, Pua left Honolulu for the United States mainland. In 1938, the Resort, which sat on the edge of Lake Arrowhead, resembled a Swiss Chalet and had been renovated. The Resort featured daily performances by the Pua Kealoha Hawaiian Trio, other well known singers and bands, Yacht races, and a variety of sports including golf, fishing, and swimming races. Pua spent much of his time in Laguna Beach, California, becoming known as a diver, surfer, beachboy, and player of the ukelele. Burton Ogilvie, the owner of the Lake Arrowhead resort, also owned the Royal Hawaiian Hotel in Waikiki. Kealoha later earned his livelihood as a musician on ocean line cruisers particularly the Matson Lines' "White Ships'", SS Monterey, renamed the Matsonia, and the SS Mariposa. The Matson Navigation Company had a Hawaiian Hotels Division, and when in Honolulu, the Matson Cruise line's SS Matsonia made stops at the Royal Hawaiian where Kealoha's Hawaiian band had performed. Kealoha became a world traveler to exotic Pacific locations while working on the Matsonia, as in addition to making stops in California, the Matsonia docked in Fiji, Samoa, New Zealand and Australia. In his later years, Kealoha gained weight, tipping the scales at close to 250 lbs., becoming a commanding on-stage personality. From around 1968-1973, Kealoha and fellow musician Robert E. Krebs, a drummer, performed on the cruise liner SS President Roosevelt, and Kealoha may have cruised with other ships of the American President Lines, named for U.S. Presidents. Around 1969, while cruising together on the SS President Roosevelt, Kealoha made a will naming Krebs a beneficiary. Among the items Krebs inherited from Kealoha were his Olympic gold medal and a ring.

When Duke Kahonamoku died on January 22, 1968, Kealoha returned to Hawaii from San Francisco with childhood friend John Gregory Monte Junior, a Honolulu beachboy, to attend the funeral of Kahonamoku at Hawaii's St. Andrew's Cathedral. Monte, who was living in California at the time, and Kealoha met in Los Angeles to fly to Hawaii.

=== Movie extra ===
Kealoha may have begun work as an extra in a few movies after completing a swimming tour that ended in Hollywood with U.S. Olympic swim team companions and film stars Johnny Weissmuller and Buster Crabbe. In "Gallant Bess", a 1946 MGM film directed by Andrew Martin, Kealoha played an uncredited native chief. Partially shot in Santa Barbara in 1945, Gallant Bess was based on the life of Navy warrant officer Arthur Parker and centers on a WWII soldier who finds renewed life purpose through his horse Bess, who inspired soldiers during the fighting in Japan. Kealoha also appeared in the 1944 film Rainbow Island, directed by Ralph Murphy, in which he played an uncredited native man. Kealoha continued to work as a movie extra in California into his late years. Several of his films mirrored his life as an exotic Pacific islander and native.

The Waikiki Beachboy culture is described in Grady Timmon's book, Waikiki Beachboy, released in January, 1989.

Kealoha died at 86 on August 29, 1989 in a retirement home in San Francisco, California, and was cremated. The urn containing his ashes was returned to Honolulu by long-time friend, legal heir, and fellow musician Robert Krebs, who had kept it for a year at his home in San Rafael. Kealoha's old friend Joe Akana arranged the funeral. A ceremony was held at Honolulu's Waikiki Beach by Krebs and several of Pua's former friends, including Joe Akana, on June 10, 1990. A seaside service was held, and then after paddling a canoe into the waves, his friends scattered Kealoha's ashes off Waikiki Beach, in Diamondhead, near the Sheraton-Waikiki. The area was close to where fellow U.S. Olympic swim team member Duke Kahanamoku had his ashes scattered in 1969.

== See also ==
- List of Olympic medalists in swimming (men)
- World record progression 4 × 200 metres freestyle relay
