= Karel Wälzer =

Czech ice hockey player (1888–1948)

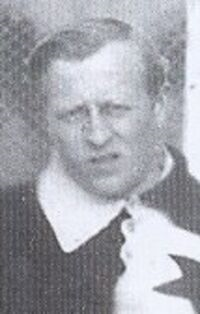
- Born: 28 August 1888 Plzeň, Austria-Hungary
- Died: January 1948 (aged 59) Prague, Czechoslovakia
- Position: Goaltender
- National team: Bohemia and Czechoslovakia
- Playing career: 1910–1921
Medal record
Olympic Games
Bronze medal – third place	1920 Antwerp	Team

Karel Wälzer (28 August 1888 – January 1948) was a Czech ice hockey player who competed in the 1920 Summer Olympics, helping the Czechoslovakia national team win the bronze medal. The main goaltender for the team, Wälzer broke his thumb before the start of the tournament, was unable to play the first two games, against Canada and the United States, returning for the final match against Sweden. Wälzer helped Czechoslovakia win, giving the team the bronze.
