= Demerval Peixoto =

Brazilian sports shooter

Personal information
- Born: 11 December 1884; São Fidélis, Empire of Brazil
- Died: 23 September 1962 (aged 77)

Sport
- Sport: Sports shooting

Demerval Peixoto (11 December 1884 – 23 September 1962) was a Brazilian sports shooter. He competed in two events at the 1920 Summer Olympics.
