= Agostinho Sampaio de Sá =

Brazilian water polo player

Personal information
- Nationality: Brazilian
- Born: 8 January 1897
- Died: 28 April 1960 (aged 63)

Sport
- Sport: Water polo

Agostinho Sampaio de Sá (8 January 1897 – 28 April 1960) was a Brazilian water polo player. He competed in the men's tournament at the 1920 Summer Olympics.

== See also ==
- Brazil men's Olympic water polo team records and statistics
- List of men's Olympic water polo tournament goalkeepers
