= Mikes Tsamis =

Greek water polo player

Personal information
- Nationality: Greek
- Born: 1895

Sport
- Sport: Water polo

Mikes Tsamis (born 1895, date of death unknown) was a Greek water polo player. He competed in the men's tournament at the 1920 Summer Olympics.
