= Abrahão Saliture =

Brazilian rower

Personal information
- Born: 17 December 1884; Rio de Janeiro, Brazil
- Died: 30 April 1967 (aged 82)

Sport
- Sport: Rowing

Abrahão Saliture (17 December 1884 – 30 April 1967) was a Brazilian rower. He competed in the men's coxed four event at the 1920 Summer Olympics. He also competed in the water polo tournament at the same Olympics.
