= Alcides Paiva =

Brazilian water polo player

Personal information
- Born: 5 September 1894; Rio de Janeiro, Brazil
- Died: 5 December 1959 (aged 65)

Sport
- Sport: Water polo

Alcides Barros Paiva (5 September 1894 – 5 December 1959) was a Brazilian water polo player. He competed in the men's tournament at the 1920 Summer Olympics.
