= Victorino Ramos Fernandes =

Brazilian water polo player

Personal information
- Born: 29 March 1896; Rio de Janeiro, Brazil
- Died: 2 March 1983 (aged 86); Rio de Janeiro, Brazil

Sport
- Sport: Water polo

Victorino Ramos Fernandes (29 March 1896 – 2 March 1983) was a Brazilian water polo player. He competed in the men's tournament at the 1920 Summer Olympics.
