= František Franěk =

Czech water polo player (1901–1973)

Personal information
- Nationality: Czech
- Born: 10 February 1901 Prague, Austria-Hungary
- Died: 14 November 1973 (aged 72) Prague, Czechoslovakia

Sport
- Sport: Water polo

František Franěk (10 February 1901 – 14 November 1973) was a Czech water polo player. He competed at the 1920 Summer Olympics and the 1924 Summer Olympics.

He has been involved in competitive swimming and water polo since 1920 in the Prague swimming club APK Praha, which was formed by the departure of members of the swimming section of AC Sparta Praha. In swimming he was mostly a member of relays and as a polo player he played as a defender. In 1920, he was nominated to the Olympic Games in Antwerp as a substitute for the Czechoslovak polo team and because one of the players in the starting line-up refused to play due to poor conditions (water temperature of 10 °C), he played as a defender in the match against Sweden. In 1924, he was already a member of the starting line-up at the Paris Olympics. He played water polo actively until 1932. After his sporting career he was a water polo referee.
