= Orlando Amêndola =

Brazilian swimmer

Personal information
- Full name: Orlando Amêndola
- Born: 2 November 1899 Brazil
- Died: 10 May 1974 (aged 74) Brazil

Sport
- Sport: Swimming
- Strokes: Freestyle
Medal record
Men's swimming
Men's water polo
Men's rowing
Representing Brazil

Orlando Amêndola (2 November 1899 – 10 May 1974) was an Olympic freestyle swimmer, water polo player, and rower from Brazil, who participated at one Summer Olympics for his native country.

He was an athlete at Clube de Regatas Boqueirão do Passeio, where he practiced swimming, water polo, and rowing.

He started playing polo in 1916 and quickly became a skilled player. In 1918, he was Rio de Janeiro's champion of the 100 meters freestyle.

He was one of the first Brazilians who participated at the Olympics. At the 1920 Summer Olympics in Helsinki, the first time that Brazil participated in the Games, he swam the 100-metre freestyle, not reaching the finals. He also participated in the water polo, finishing fourth with the Brazil team. He also participated in rowing.
