= František Černík (water polo) =

Czech water polo player (1900–1982)

Personal information
- Nationality: Czech
- Born: June 14, 1900; Malá Strana, Prague, Austria-Hungary
- Died: July 21, 1982 (aged 82); Prague, Czechoslovakia

Sport
- Sport: Water polo, swimming
- Position: Center, offensive wing
- Club: AC Sparta Prague (until 1920); APK Prague (since 1920)

František Černík (14 June 1900 – 21 July 1982) was a Czech water polo player. He competed in the men's tournament at the 1920 Summer Olympics. He was also a member of the team at the 1924 Summer Olympics, but didn't play.
