= Antonín Novotný (water polo) =

Czech water polo player (1900–1962)

Personal information
- Nationality: Czech
- Born: 24 November 1900; Prague, Czechoslovakia
- Died: 25 March 1962 (aged 61); Prague, Czechoslovakia

Sport
- Sport: Water polo

Antonín Novotný (24 November 1900 – 25 March 1962) was a Czech water polo player. He competed in the men's tournament at the 1920 Summer Olympics.
