= Ângelo Gammaro =

Brazilian swimmer and water polo player

Personal information
- Born: 17 September 1895 Rio de Janeiro, Rio de Janeiro, Brazil
- Died: 12 June 1977 (aged 81) Rio de Janeiro, Rio de Janeiro, Brazil

Sport
- Sport: Swimming
- Strokes: Freestyle

Ângelo Chiappeta Gammaro (17 September 1895 – 12 June 1977) was a Brazilian sportsman. He competed at one Olympics for his native country. Born in Rio de Janeiro, he represented Brazil in swimming and water polo at the 1920 Olympics.

He was one of the first Brazilians who participated at the Olympics. At the 1920 Summer Olympics in Helsinki, the first time that Brazil participated in the Games, he swam the 100-meter freestyle, not reaching the finals. He also participated in the Water Polo, finishing fourth with the Brazil team.
