= João Jório =

Brazilian rower

Personal information
- Nationality: Brazilian
- Born: 29 November 1886
- Died: Unknown

Sport
- Sport: Rowing

João Jório (born 29 November 1886, date of death unknown) was a Brazilian rower. He competed in the men's coxed four event at the 1920 Summer Olympics. He also competed in the water polo tournament at the same Olympics.
