= Sweden at the 1920 Summer Olympics =

- IOC code: SWE
- NOC: Swedish Olympic Committee

in Antwerp
- Competitors: 260 (247 men and 13 women) in 18 sports
- Flag bearer: Hans Granfelt
- Medals Ranked 2nd: Gold 19 Silver 20 Bronze 25 Total 64

Summer Olympics appearances (overview)
- 1896; 1900; 1904; 1908; 1912; 1920; 1924; 1928; 1932; 1936; 1948; 1952; 1956; 1960; 1964; 1968; 1972; 1976; 1980; 1984; 1988; 1992; 1996; 2000; 2004; 2008; 2012; 2016; 2020; 2024

Other related appearances
- 1906 Intercalated Games

Sweden competed at the 1920 Summer Olympics in Antwerp, Belgium. 260 competitors, 247 men and 13 women, took part in 100 events in 18 sports.

== Medalists ==
Medal	Name	Sport	Event
Gold	William Petersson	Athletics	Men's Long jump
Gold	Harry Stenqvist	Cycling	Men's Individual Time Trial
Gold	Arvid Wallman	Diving	Plain high diving
Gold	Janne Lundblad	Equestrian	Individual dressage
Gold	Helmer Morner	Equestrian	Individual three-day event
Gold	Helmer Mörner, Åge Lundström, Georg von Braun and Gustaf Dyrsch	Equestrian	Team three-day event
Gold	Hans von Rosen, Claës König, Daniel Norling and Frank Martin	Equestrian	Team jumping
Gold	Gillis Grafström	Figure skating	Men's singles
Gold	Magda Julin	Figure skating	Women's singles
Gold	Swedish Men's Team	Gymnastics	Men's team (Swedish system)
Gold	Gustaf Dyrssen	Modern pentathlon	Men's Individual
Gold	Gösta Lundqvist, Rolf Steffenburg, Gösta Bengtsson and Axel Calvert	Sailing	Men's 30 m^{2} class
Gold	Tore Holm, Yngve Holm, Axel Rydin and Georg Tengwall	Sailing	Men's 40 m^{2} class
Gold	Hugo Johansson	Shooting	Men's 600m free rifle
Gold	Håkan Malmrot	Swimming	Men's 200m breaststroke
Gold	Håkan Malmrot	Swimming	Men's 400m breaststroke
Gold	Anders Larsson	Wrestling	Freestyle light heavyweight
Gold	Carl Westergren	Wrestling	Greco-Roman middleweight
Gold	Claes Johanson	Wrestling	Greco-Roman light heavyweight
Silver	Erik Backman	Athletics	Men's Individual Cross country
Silver	Carl Johan Lind	Athletics	Men's Hammer throw
Silver	Folke Jansson	Athletics	Men's Triple jump
Silver	Harry Stenqvist, Ragnar Malm, Axel Persson and Sigfrid Lundberg	Cycling	Men's Team Time Trial
Silver	Erik Adlerz	Diving	Men's 10m Platform
Silver	Nils Skoglund	Diving	Plain high diving
Silver	Age Lundstrom	Equestrian	Individual eventing
Silver	Bertil Sandström	Equestrian	Individual dressage
Silver	Svea Norén	Figure skating	Women's singles
Silver	Erik de Laval	Modern pentathlon	Men's Individual
Silver	Gustaf Svensson, Ragnar Svensson, Percy Almstedt and Erik Mellbin	Sailing	Men's 40 m^{2} class
Silver	Fredric Landelius	Shooting	Men's 100m running deer, double shots
Silver	Alfred Swahn, Oscar Swahn, Fredric Landelius, Bengt Lagercrantz and Edward Benedicks	Shooting	Men's Team 100m running deer, double shots
Silver	Alfred Swahn	Shooting	Men's 100m running deer, single shot
Silver	Anders Andersson, Casimir Reuterskiöld, Gunnar Gabrielsson, Sigvard Hultcrantz, Anders Johnson	Shooting	Men's Team 50m army pistol
Silver	Sigvard Hultcrantz, Erik Ohlsson, Leon Lagerlöf, Ragnar Stare and Olle Ericsson	Shooting	Men's Team 50m small bore rifle
Silver	Mauritz Eriksson	Shooting	600m free rifle
Silver	Thor Henning	Swimming	Men's 200m breaststroke
Silver	Thor Henning	Swimming	Men's 400m breaststroke
Silver	Gottfrid Svensson	Wrestling	Freestyle lightweight
Bronze	Erik Backman, Sven Lundgren and Edvin Wide	Athletics	Men's 3000m Team
Bronze	Nils Engdahl	Athletics	Men's 400m
Bronze	Agne Holmström, William Petersson, Sven Malm and Nils Sandström	Athletics	Men's 4 × 100 m Relay
Bronze	Erik Backman	Athletics	Men's 5000m
Bronze	Carl Johan Lind	Athletics	Men's 56 lb weight throw
Bronze	Erik Backman, Gustaf Mattsson and Hilding Ekman	Athletics	Men's Team Cross country
Bronze	Bertil Ohlson	Athletics	Men's Decathlon
Bronze	Bo Ekelund	Athletics	Men's High jump
Bronze	Erik Abrahamsson	Athletics	Men's Long jump
Bronze	Erik Almlöf	Athletics	Men's Triple jump
Bronze	Eva Olliwier	Diving	Women's 10m Platform
Bronze	John Jansson	Diving	Plain high diving
Bronze	Carl Gustaf Lewenhaupt	Equestrian	Individual jumping
Bronze	Hans von Rosen	Equestrian	Individual dressage
Bronze	Anders Mårtensson, Oskar Nilsson and Carl Green	Equestrian	Team vaulting
Bronze	Gösta Runö	Modern pentathlon	Men's Individual
Bronze	Olle Ericsson, Hugo Johansson, Leon Lagerlöf, Walfrid Hellman and Mauritz Eriksson	Shooting	Men's Team 300m army rifle, standing
Bronze	Mauritz Eriksson, Hugo Johansson, Gustaf Jonsson, Erik Blomqvist and Erik Ohlsson	Shooting	Men's Team 600m free rifle
Bronze	Erik Lundquist, Per Kinde, Fredric Landelius, Alfred Swahn, Karl Richter and Erik Sökjer-Petersén	Shooting	Men's Team clay pigeons
Bronze	Aina Berg, Emy Machnow, Carin Nilsson and Jane Gylling	Swimming	Women's 4 × 100 m freestyle relay
Bronze	Harald Julin, Robert Andersson, Vilhelm Andersson, Erik Bergqvist, Max Gumpel, Pontus Hanson, Erik Andersson, Nils Backlund, Torsten Kumfeldt, Theodor Nauman	Water polo	Men's Team competition
Bronze	Albert Pettersson	Weightlifting	Middleweight
Bronze	Erik Pettersson	Weightlifting	Light heavyweight
Bronze	Ernst Nilsson	Wrestling	Freestyle heavyweight
Bronze	Fritiof Svensson	Wrestling	Greco-Roman featherweight

== Aquatics ==
=== Diving ===
Twelve divers, eight men and four women, represented Sweden in 1920. It was the nation's third appearance in the sport. Four of the eight men took a medal each, and the group added three fourth-place finishes. Sweden's four plain high divers took the top four places in that event, with Adlerz (fourth in the plain high dive) adding a silver in the platform. On the women's side, Olliwier was the only diver to advance to the final; she finished with the bronze medal.

Men

Ranks given are within the semifinal group.

Diver	Event	Semifinals			Final		
Diver	Event	Points	Score	Rank	Points	Score	Rank
Erik Adlerz	10 m platform	9	468.50	1 Q	10	495.40	2nd place, silver medalist(s)
Erik Adlerz	Plain high dive	11	177.0	2 Q	19	173.0	4
Gustaf Blomgren	3 m springboard	7	614.00	1 Q	19	587.05	4
Gustaf Blomgren	10 m platform	11	468.10	2 Q	23	453.80	4
Oscar Dose	3 m springboard	20	543.70	4	did not advance		
Gunnar Ekstrand	3 m springboard	15	560.85	3 Q	27	559.25	5
Gunnar Ekstrand	10 m platform	20	402.80	4	did not advance		
John Jansson	3 m springboard	16	549.70	3 Q	34	544.75	6
John Jansson	Plain high dive	8	171.5	1 Q	16	175.0	3rd place, bronze medalist(s)
Yngve Johnson	10 m platform	7	445.80	1 Q	27	424.00	5
Nils Skoglund	Plain high dive	10	153.0	1 Q	8	183.0	2nd place, silver medalist(s)
Arvid Wallman	Plain high dive	8	175.5	1 Q	7	183.5	1st place, gold medalist(s)

Women

Ranks given are within the semifinal group.

Diver	Event	Semifinals			Final		
Diver	Event	Points	Score	Rank	Points	Score	Rank
Märta Adlerz	10 m platform	29	136.5	7	did not advance		
Selma Andersson	10 m platform	25	143.0	6	did not advance		
Karin Leiditz	10 m platform	20	147.0	5	did not advance		
Eva Olliwier	10 m platform	6	152.0	1 Q	11	166.0	3rd place, bronze medalist(s)

=== Swimming ===
Thirteen swimmers, nine men and four women, represented Sweden in 1920. It was the nation's fourth appearance in the sport.

The breaststroke was Sweden's strength, with all five men's individual finals appearances made by three swimmers in those two events. Malmrot and Henning finished first and second, respectively, in both events. Malmrot also posted a new Olympic record in the 200 metre event. The men's relay also advanced to the finals, placing fourth.

The women's relay team added a fifth medal just by showing up—only three teams competed. The Swedish women took bronze. Gylling also advanced to each of the women's individual event finals, placing sixth in both.

Ranks given are within the heat.

Men

Swimmer	Event	Quarterfinals		Semifinals		Final	
Swimmer	Event	Result	Rank	Result	Rank	Result	Rank
Arne Borg	400 m free	Unknown	4	did not advance			
Arne Borg	1500 m free	23:54.4	3 q	Unknown	4	did not advance	
Per Cederblom	200 m breast	3:12.2	2 Q	3:14.6	2 Q	did not finish	
Per Cederblom	400 m breast	7:14.0	2 Q	7:05.6	2 Q	Unknown	5
Olle Dickson	200 m breast	3:16.0	1 Q	Unknown	4	did not advance	
Olle Dickson	400 m breast	7:12.0	1 Q	6:59.0	4	did not advance	
Thor Henning	200 m breast	3:12.8	1 Q	3:16.0	3 q	3:09.2	2nd place, silver medalist(s)
Thor Henning	400 m breast	6:46.2	1 Q	6:45.0	2 Q	6:45.2	2nd place, silver medalist(s)
Per Holmström	100 m back	1:26.0	4	did not advance			
Håkan Malmrot	200 m breast	3:04.0 OR	1 Q	3:09.0	1 Q	3:04.4	1st place, gold medalist(s)
Håkan Malmrot	400 m breast	6:49.0	1 Q	6:44.8	1 Q	6:31.8	1st place, gold medalist(s)
Frans Möller	1500 m free	27:42.0	3	did not advance			
Orvar Trolle	100 m free	1:07.8	3 q	Unknown	5	did not advance	
Robert Andersson; Arne Borg; Frans Möller; Orvar Trolle	4 × 200 m free relay	N/A		10:54.4	3 q	10:50.2	4

Women

Swimmer	Event	Semifinals		Final	
Swimmer	Event	Result	Rank	Result	Rank
Aina Berg	100 m free	Unknown	5	did not advance	
Aina Berg	300 m free	5:29.6	3	did not advance	
Jane Gylling	100 m free	1:25.6	2 Q	Unknown	6
Jane Gylling	300 m free	5:04.8	3 q	Unknown	6
Carin Nilsson	100 m free	Unknown	6	did not advance	
Carin Nilsson	300 m free	5:07.0	3	did not advance	
Aina Berg; Jane Gylling; Emily Machnow; Carin Nilsson	4 × 100 m free relay	N/A		5:43.6	3rd place, bronze medalist(s)

== Athletics ==
64 athletes represented Sweden in 1920. It was the nation's fifth appearance in athletics, a sport in which Sweden had competed each time the nation appeared at the Olympics. Sweden had success in a variety of events, but its best performances came in the field events. Petersson took the country's only gold medal of the Games in the long jump. The team also finished with three silver and ten bronze medals, enough to put Sweden in fifth place on the athletics medals leader board despite gathering the fewest gold medals since 1900.

Ranks given are within the heat.

Athlete	Event	Heats		Quarterfinals		Semifinals		Final	
Athlete	Event	Result	Rank	Result	Rank	Result	Rank	Result	Rank
Erik Abrahamsson	Long jump	6.86	2 Q	—N/a				7.08	3rd place, bronze medalist(s)
Knut Alm	Cross country	—N/a							30
Erik Almlöf	Triple jump	14.19	2 Q	—N/a				14.27	3rd place, bronze medalist(s)
Eric Backman	5000 m	—N/a				15:34.0	2 Q	15:13.0	3rd place, bronze medalist(s)
Eric Backman	10000 m	—N/a				32:48.5	2 Q	did not finish	
Eric Backman	Cross country	—N/a						27:17.6	2nd place, silver medalist(s)
Nils Bergström	5000 m	—N/a				15:39.2	4 Q	15:29.5	10
Nils Bergström	10000 m	—N/a				33:38.0	6	did not advance	
Gösta Bladin	400 m hurdles	—N/a		57.7	2 Q	56.5	4	did not advance	
Gösta Bladin	Long jump	6.57	9	—N/a				did not advance	
Erik Blomqvist	Shot put	11.935	16	—N/a				did not advance	
Erik Blomqvist	Javelin throw	58.18	7 Q	—N/a				58.18	8
Tolly Bolin	400 m	52.6	3	did not advance					
Tolly Bolin	800 m	—N/a		1:57.8	3 Q	1:57.5	5	did not advance	
Carl-Axel Christiernsson	110 m hurdles	—N/a			2 Q	15.2	3 Q	15.3	6
Carl-Axel Christiernsson	400 m hurdles	—N/a		56.4	1 Q	55.7	2 Q	55.4	5
Bo Ekelund	High jump	1.80	1 Q	—N/a				1.90	3rd place, bronze medalist(s)
Hilding Ekman	Cross country	—N/a						28:17.0	11
Nils Engdahl	400 m	50.6	2 Q	50.4	1 Q	49.4	1 Q	50.2	3rd place, bronze medalist(s)
Nils Engdahl	800 m	—N/a		2:00.0	5	did not advance			
Allan Eriksson	Discus throw	39.41	6 Q	—N/a				39.41	6
Rudolf Falk	5000 m	—N/a				15:17.8	1 Q		11
Rolf Franksson	Long jump	6.73	4 Q	—N/a				6.73	6
William Grüner	Marathon	—N/a						3:01:48.0	28
Axel-Erik Gyllenstolpe	Pentathlon	—N/a						did not finish	
Axel-Erik Gyllenstolpe	Decathlon	—N/a						6331.435	8
Lars Hedwall	3000 m steeplechase	—N/a				10:43.5	2 Q	10:42.2	7
Lars Hedwall	Cross country	—N/a							24
Georg Högström	Pole vault	3.60	1 Q	—N/a				3.50	8
Gösta Holmér	110 m hurdles	—N/a			3	did not advance			
Gösta Holmér	Decathlon	—N/a						6532.150	4
Agne Holmström	100 m		3	did not advance					
Agne Holmström	200 m	23.3	2 Q	22.5	5	did not advance			
Josef Holsner	3000 m steeplechase	—N/a				did not finish		did not advance	
Göran Hultin	110 m hurdles	—N/a			2 Q		6	did not advance	
Hans Jagenburg	High jump	1.80	1 Q	—N/a				1.75	9
Bertil Jansson	Shot put	13.27	9	—N/a				did not advance	
Folke Jansson	Triple jump	14.16	3 Q	—N/a				14.48	2nd place, silver medalist(s)
Elis Johansson	800 m	—N/a			8	did not advance			
Gustav Kinn	Marathon	—N/a						2:49:10.4	17
Fritz Kiölling	1500 m	—N/a				4:15.0	4	did not advance	
Sven Krokström	200 m	23.8	1 Q	23.3	4	did not advance			
Sven Krokström	400 m	51.6	3	did not advance					
Hugo Lilliér	Javelin throw	56.77	10 Q	—N/a				56.77	10
Carl Johan Lind	Hammer throw	48.00	3 Q	—N/a				48.43	2nd place, silver medalist(s)
Carl Johan Lind	56 lb weight throw	10.255	3 Q	—N/a				10.255	3rd place, bronze medalist(s)
Nils Linde	Hammer throw	44.885	7	—N/a				did not advance	
Nils Linde	56 lb weight throw	8.635	11	—N/a				did not advance	
Elof Lindström	Javelin throw	51.53	13	—N/a				did not advance	
Georg Lindström	110 m hurdles	—N/a		15.9	3	did not advance			
Georg Lindström	400 m hurdles	—N/a		59.1	3	did not advance			
Gunnar Lindström	Javelin throw	60.52	4 Q	—N/a				60.52	6
Erik Lindvall	100 m		3	did not advance					
Sven Lundgren	800 m	—N/a		2:00.6	1 Q	1:58.4	4	did not advance	
Sven Lundgren	1500 m	—N/a				4:07.0	1 Q	4:12.0	5
Emanuel Lundström	5000 m	—N/a				16:04.2	4 Q		13
Werner Magnusson	10000 m	—N/a				34:49.2	6	did not advance	
Werner Magnusson	Cross country	—N/a							13
Sven Malm	100 m		5	did not advance					
Sven Malm	200 m	23.3	3	did not advance					
John Mattsson	Pole vault	3.60	1 Q	—N/a				3.50	9
Gustaf Mattsson	3000 m steeplechase	—N/a				10:22.6	2 Q	10:32.1	4
Gustaf Mattsson	Cross country	—N/a						28:16.0	10
Einar Nilsson	Shot put	13.735	5 Q	—N/a				13.87	5
Evert Nilsson	Pentathlon	—N/a						did not finish	
Evert Nilsson	Decathlon	—N/a						6433.530	5
Bertil Ohlson	Pentathlon	—N/a						29	7
Bertil Ohlson	Decathlon	—N/a						6580.030	3rd place, bronze medalist(s)
Robert Olsson	Hammer throw	44.19	10	—N/a				did not advance	
Robert Olsson	56 lb weight throw	8.555	12	—N/a				did not advance	
William Petersson	Long jump	6.94	1 Q	—N/a				7.15	1st place, gold medalist(s)
Sven Runström	Triple jump	13.63	10	—N/a				did not advance	
Ernfrid Rydberg	Pole vault	3.60	1 Q	—N/a				3.60	5
Ivar Sahlin	Triple jump	13.86	5 Q	—N/a				14.175	5
Nils Sandström	100 m		6	did not advance					
Nils Sandström	200 m	23.6	2 Q	23.3	4	did not advance			
Hans Schuster	Marathon	—N/a						did not finish	
Eric Sundblad	400 m	52.0	1 Q	51.2	3 Q	Did not finish			
Thorvig Svahn	High jump	1.80	1 Q	—N/a				1.75	9
Carl-Enock Svensson	Pentathlon	—N/a						did not finish	
Malcolm Svensson	Hammer throw	47.29	4 Q	—N/a				47.29	4
Malcolm Svensson	56 lb weight throw	9.45	5 Q	—N/a				9.455	5
Einar Thulin	High jump	1.80	1 Q	—N/a				1.80	7
Lars Erik Tirén	Pole vault	No mark	15	—N/a				did not advance	
Rudolf Wåhlin	Marathon	—N/a						2:59:23.0	23
Edvin Wide	1500 m	—N/a				4:03.8	4	did not advance	
Oscar Zallhagen	Discus throw	40.16	5 Q	—N/a				41.07	4
John Zander	1500 m	—N/a				4:08.1	1 Q	did not finish	
Eric Backman; Hilding Ekman; Gustaf Mattsson	Team cross country	—N/a						23	3rd place, bronze medalist(s)
Eric Backman; Sven Lundgren; Edvin Wide; John Zander	3000 m team race	—N/a				12	2 Q	24	3rd place, bronze medalist(s)
Nils Engdahl; Sven Krokström; Sven Malm; Eric Sundblad	4 × 400 m relay	—N/a				3:46.4	3 Q	3:24.3	5
Agne Holmström; Sven Malm; William Petersson; Nils Sandström	4 × 100 m relay	—N/a				43.4	1 Q	42.8	3rd place, bronze medalist(s)

Fausto Acke who participated in gymnastics was also registered to participate in men's discus throw, but did not start.

== Cycling ==
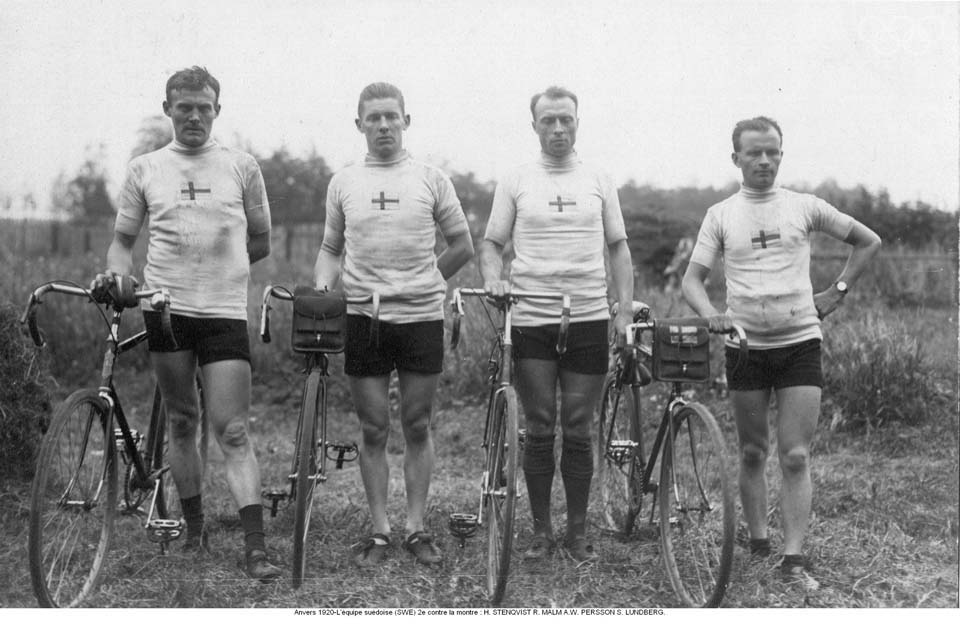
The Swedish team won silver in the men's team time trial

Four cyclists represented Sweden in 1920. It was the nation's third appearance in the sport. The Swedes competed only in the road time trial events, with Stenqvist posting the best time of all cyclists to take the gold medal. The combined team of the four Swedish cyclists was good for a silver medal.

=== Road cycling ===
Cyclist	Event	Final	
Cyclist	Event	Result	Rank
Sigfrig Lundberg	Time trial	5:03:02.6	22
Karl Malm	Time trial	4:46:22.0	7
Axel Persson	Time trial	4:53:43.6	12
Harry Stenqvist	Time trial	4:40:01.8	1st place, gold medalist(s)
Sigfrig Lundberg; Karl Malm; Axel Persson; Harry Stenqvist	Team time trial	19:23:10.0	2nd place, silver medalist(s)

== Equestrian ==
Twenty-two equestrians represented Sweden in 1920. It was the nation's second appearance in the sport. Sweden took four of the seven gold medals, and finished with a total of nine medals.

The five dressage competitors initially took the top five places in the individual competition, though Boltenstern was disqualified and thus the Swedes eventually held only the top four places (no team dressage event was held in 1920). It was the second straight time that Sweden had swept the dressage medals. The eventers took the top two individual places, as well as the gold medal in the team event. The individual jumpers' best result was a bronze medal, while a separate group of riders took the gold in the team event. The vaulters had the most difficulty, coming in at the bottom four spots if finishing at all, though still receiving the bronze in the team event because only three nations entered.

Equestrian	Horse	Event	Final	
Equestrian	Horse	Event	Result	Rank
Nils Åkerblom	Heikki	Jumping	19.50	23
Gustaf Adolf Boltenstern	Iron	Dressage	Disqualified	
Karl Dyrsch	Salamis	Eventing	did not finish	
Allan Ekman	Tagore	Jumping	21.50	24
Carl Green		Vaulting	20.500	13
Gustaf Kilman	Irving	Jumping	10.00	15
Herman Kristoffersson		Vaulting	did not finish	
Carl Gustaf Lewenhaupt	Mon Coeur	Jumping	4.00	3rd place, bronze medalist(s)
Janne Lundblad	Uno	Dressage	27.9375	1st place, gold medalist(s)
Åge Lundström	Ysra	Eventing	1738.75	2nd place, silver medalist(s)
Åge Lundström	Eros	Jumping	9.75	14
Anders Mårtensson		Vaulting	20.250	15
Helmer Mörner	Germania	Eventing	1775.00	1st place, gold medalist(s)
Fredrik Nilsson		Vaulting	14.916	17
Oskar Nilsson		Vaulting	18.666	16
Bertil Sandström	Sabel	Dressage	26.3125	2nd place, silver medalist(s)
Georg von Braun	Diana	Eventing	1543.75	8
Wilhelm von Essen	Nomeg	Dressage	24.8750	4
Hans von Rosen	Running Sister	Dressage	25.1250	3rd place, bronze medalist(s)
Lars von Stockenström	Reward	Jumping	6.00	5
Carl Green; Anders Mårtensson; Oskar Nilsson		Team vaulting	59.416	3rd place, bronze medalist(s)
Gustaf Dyrsch; Åge Lundström; Helmer Mörner; Georg von Braun	Salamis; Ysra; Germania; Diana	Team eventing	5057.50	1st place, gold medalist(s)
Claës König; Frank Martin; Daniel Norling; Hans von Rosen	Tresor; Kohort; Eros II; Poor Boy	Team jumping	14.00	1st place, gold medalist(s)

== Fencing ==
Eight fencers represented Sweden in 1920. It was the nation's fourth appearance in the sport. Lindblom was the only individual fencer to advance to a final, placing ninth in the épée. The épée was the only team event Sweden entered; the team went winless in its four matches in its semifinal pool.

Ranks given are within the group.

Fencer	Event	First round		Quarterfinals		Semifinals		Final	
Fencer	Event	Result	Rank	Result	Rank	Result	Rank	Result	Rank
Knut Enell	Épée	2–5	6	did not advance					
Knut Enell	Foil	N/A		4–2	3 Q	1–4	5	did not advance	
Carl Gripenstedt	Épée	4–5	5 Q	3–7	10	did not advance			
Nils Hellsten	Épée	6–2	1 Q	8–2	1 Q	4–7	8	did not advance	
Nils Hellsten	Foil	N/A		0–6	7	did not advance			
Gustaf Lindblom	Épée	5–4	3 Q	7–3	2 Q	6–5	3 Q	4–7	9
Gustaf Lindblom	Foil	N/A		2–6	7	did not advance			
Einar Råberg	Épée	0–8	9	did not advance					
Hans Törnblom	Épée	2–4	7	did not advance					
Hans Törnblom	Foil	N/A		1–7	8	did not advance			
Bertil Uggla	Épée	2–5	7	did not advance					
David Warholm	Épée	3–5	6	did not advance					
Nils Hellsten; Gustaf Lindblom; Bertil Uggla; David Warholm	Team épée	N/A				0–4	6	did not advance	

== Football ==
Summary

Key:

- W – Win D – Draw L – Loss
- A.E.T – After extra time.
- RP – Game replayed

Team	Event	Gold medal round				Silver/Bronze medal round			Rank
Team	Event	First round	Quarterfinal	Semifinal	Final	First round	Second round	Final	Rank
Team	Event	Opposition Score	Opposition Score	Opposition Score	Opposition Score	Opposition Score	Opposition Score	Opposition Score	Rank
Sweden men's	Men's tournament	Greece; W 9–0	Netherlands; L 4–5 (a.e.t.)	Did not advance		Spain; L 1–2	Did not advance		5

Sweden competed in the Olympic football tournament for the third time. Its first match was an easy 9–0 win over Greece. The second match also featured nine goals, but Sweden scored only four of them to lose in extra time. Sweden also lost in the first round of the consolation tournament.

First round

August 28, 1920

Sweden	9–0	Greece
Olsson 4' 79'; Karlsson 15' 20' 21' 51' 85'; Wicksell 25'; Dahl 31'	Report

Olympisch Stadion, Antwerp
Attendance: 5,000
Referee: Charles Barette (BEL)

Quarterfinals

August 29, 1920

Netherlands	5–4 (a.e.t.)	Sweden
Groosjohan 10' 57'; J. Bulder 44' 88' (pen.) de Natris 115'	Report	Karlsson 16' 32'; Olsson 20'; Dahl 72'

Broodstraat, Antwerp
Attendance: 5,000
Referee: Josef Fanta (TCH)

Consolation first round

September 1, 1920

Spain	2–1	Sweden
Belauste 51'; Acedo 53'	Report	Dahl 28'

Broodstraat, Antwerp
Attendance: 1,500
Referee: Giovanni Mauro (ITA)

Final rank
8th

== Gymnastics ==
Twenty-four gymnasts represented Sweden in 1920. It was the nation's fourth appearance in the sport. Sweden entered a team in the Swedish system competition, defeating Denmark and Belgium to win the gold medal. No Swedish gymnasts competed in the individual event, nor did Sweden enter teams in the other two team events.

=== Artistic gymnastics ===
Gymnast	Event	Final	
Gymnast	Event	Result	Rank
Fausto Acke; Albert Andersson; Arvid Andersson-Holtman; Bengt Bengtsson; Fabian Biörck; Helge Bäckander; Erik Charpentier; Sture Ericsson-Ewreus; Ture Hedman; Åke Häger; Konrad Granström; Helge Gustafsson; Sven Johnson; Sven-Olof Jonsson; Karl Lindahl; Edmund Lindmark; Bengt Mohrberg; Frans Persson; Curt Sjöberg; Erik Svensen; Klas Särner; Gunnar Söderlindh; John Sörenson; Gösta Törner	Team, Swedish system	1363.833	1st place, gold medalist(s)

== Ice hockey ==
Summary

Team	Event	Gold medal round			Silver medal round		Bronze medal round		Rank
Team	Event	Quarterfinal	Semifinal	Final	Semifinal	Final	Semifinal	Final	Rank
Team	Event	Opposition Score	Opposition Score	Opposition Score	Opposition Score	Opposition Score	Opposition Score	Opposition Score	Rank
Sweden men's	Men's tournament	Belgium; W 8–0	France; W 4–0	Canada; L 1–12	United States; L 0–7	Did not advance	Switzerland; W 4–0	Czechoslovakia; L 0–1	4

Sweden competed in the inaugural Olympic ice hockey tournament. The team was unfortunate in the use of the Bergvall System, which caused the Swedes to have to play six games in seven days and resulted in a fourth-place finish for a team which would have taken the silver medal in a straight single-elimination tournament.

Sweden started well, beating Belgium and France by a combined score of 12–0. In the final, however, the team faced a dominant Canadian side and fell 12–1. In the silver medal semifinals, Sweden was again defeated, this time by the United States who went on to win the silver medal and give Sweden a chance at the bronze. The Swedes finally got their third win in the bronze medal semifinals, beating Switzerland. The bronze medal match pitted Sweden against the only team the Swedes had not yet played in the 1920 Olympic tournament; Czechoslovakia's only goal of the tournament was enough to defeat Sweden, 1–0.

Roster

Coach: (United States) Raoul Le Mat

Pos	Player	GP	G	Birthdate	Age	Club
R/D	Wilhelm Arwe	3	2	January 28, 1898	22	IK Göta
F	Erik Burman	5	4	December 6, 1897	22	IK Göta
G	Seth Howander	5	0	October 6, 1892	27	IFK Uppsala
G	Albin Jansson	1	0	October 9, 1897	22	Järva IS
F	Georg Johansson	6	3	May 10, 1898	21	IK Göta
F	Einar Lindqvist	6	3	May 31, 1895	24	IFK Uppsala
R/D	Einar Lundell	5	0	January 9, 1894	26	IK Göta
F/D	Hans-Jacob Mattsson	1	0	June 2, 1890	30	
R	Nils Molander	4	2	May 22, 1889	30	Berliner Schlittschuhclub
F	David Säfwenberg	1	1	October 1, 1896	23	Berliner Sport Club
R	Einar Svensson	5	2	September 27, 1894	25	IK Göta

Gold medal quarterfinals

23 April 1920; 21:30	Sweden	8 – 0 (5–0, 3–0)	Belgium	Palais de Glace d'Anvers

Game reference

Seth Howander
Goalies
François Vergult
Referee:
(Canada) W. A. Hewitt

Burman	1 – 0
Johansson	2 – 0
Burman	3 – 0
Lindqvist	4 – 0
Burman	5 – 0
Johansson	6 – 0
Molander	7 – 0
Lindqvist	8 – 0

12 min
Penalties
6 min

Gold medal semifinals

25 April 1920; 17:00	Sweden	4 – 0 (2–0, 2–0)	France	Palais de Glace d'Anvers

Game reference

Seth Howander
Goalies
Jacques Gaittet
Referee:
(Canada) Ernie Garon

Burman	1 – 0
Svensson	2 – 0
Molander	3 – 0
Lindqvist	4 – 0

0 min
Penalties
0 min

Shots
1

Gold medal match

26 April 1920; 22:00	(gold) Canada	12 – 1 (5–1, 7–0)	Sweden	Palais de Glace d'Anvers

Game reference

Walter Byron
Goalies
Seth Howander
Referee:
(United States) Joseph McCormick

Halderson – 1:15	1 – 0
Fridfinnson − 1:55	2 – 0
Fredrickson – 5:20	3 – 0
	3 – 1	15:58 – Svensson
Fredrickson – 16:00	4 – 1
Fredrickson – 17:35	5 – 1
Goodman – 23:47	6 – 1
Benson – 28:09	7 – 1
Fredrickson – 29:15	8 – 1
Fredrickson – 29:30	9 – 1
Fredrickson – 34:55	10 – 1
Halderson – 36:20	11 – 1
Fredrickson – 39:02	12 – 1

0 min
Penalties
0 min

Silver medal semifinals

27 April 1920; 22:00	United States	7 – 0 (5–0, 2–0)	Sweden	Palais de Glace d'Anvers

Game reference
Cy Weidenborner	Goalies	Seth Howander
Drury (4); Geran (3) / Goals
0 min	Penalties	0 min

Bronze medal semifinals

28 April 1920; 23:30	Sweden	4 – 0 (0–0, 4–0)	Switzerland	Palais de Glace d'Anvers

Game reference

Abbe Jansson
Goalies
René Savoie
Referee:
(Canada) Frank Fredrickson

Säfwenberg	1 – 0
Johansson	2 – 0
Arwe	3 – 0
Arwe	4 – 0

0 min
Penalties
0 min

Bronze medal match

29 April 1920; 23:00	(bronze) Czechoslovakia	1 – 0 (1–0, 0–0)	Sweden	Palais de Glace d'Anvers

Game reference
Karel Wälzer	Goalies	Seth Howander	Referee: (Canada) Frank Fredrickson
Šroubek / 1 – 0			Referee: (Canada) Frank Fredrickson
0 min	Penalties	0 min	Referee: (Canada) Frank Fredrickson
2	Shots	48	Referee: (Canada) Frank Fredrickson

Final rank
4th

== Modern pentathlon ==
Four pentathletes represented Sweden in 1920. It was the nation's second appearance in the sport, having competed at both instances of the Olympic modern pentathlon. The Swedes continued their domination of the sport, sweeping the medals for the second time in two attempts and finishing with the four top spots in the competition.

A point-for-place system was used, with the lowest total score winning.

Pentathlete	Final						
Pentathlete	Riding	Fencing	Shooting	Swimming	Running	Total	Rank
Erik de Laval	1	13	5	1	3	23	2nd place, silver medalist(s)
Gustaf Dyrssen	6	2	2	6	2	18	1st place, gold medalist(s)
Gösta Runö	4	1	16	5	1	27	3rd place, bronze medalist(s)
Bengt Uggla	13	5	10	13	5	46	4

== Rowing ==
Six rowers represented Sweden in 1920. It was the nation's second appearance in the sport. Both boats were eliminated in their first race.

Ranks given are within the heat.

Rower	Cox	Event	Quarterfinals		Semifinals		Final	
Rower	Cox	Event	Result	Rank	Result	Rank	Result	Rank
Nils Ljunglöf	N/A	Single sculls	7:49.6	2	did not advance			
John Lager; Nestor Östergren; Axel Eriksson; Gunnar Lager	Gösta Eriksson	Coxed four	N/A		7:12.0	2	did not advance	

== Sailing ==
Eleven sailors represented Sweden in 1920. It was the nation's third appearance in the sport. There were three Swedish boats, competing in two classes, but no boats from any other nation competed against Sweden. In the 30 m^{2} class, there was only one boat. The 40 m^{2} was a competition between two Swedish crews. Unsurprisingly, Sweden took two gold medals and a silver.

Sailors	Class	Race 1		Race 2		Race 3		Total	
Sailors	Class	Result	Rank	Result	Rank	Result	Rank	Score	Rank
Gösta Bengtsson; Gösta Lundqvist; Rolf Steffenburg	30 m^{2}	Unknown							1st place, gold medalist(s)
Percy Almstedt; Erik Mellbin; Gustaf Svensson; Ragnar Svensson	40 m^{2}	Unknown							2nd place, silver medalist(s)
Tore Holm; Yngve Holm; Axel Rydin; Georg Tengwall	40 m^{2}	Unknown							1st place, gold medalist(s)

== Skating ==
=== Figure skating ===
Four figure skaters represented Sweden in 1920. It was the nation's second appearance in the sport; Sweden was one of three countries to compete in both Summer Olympics figure skating competitions. The top Swedish skaters took both of the singles gold medals, with their second skaters in those two events taking a silver medal and a fourth place. Sweden entered no pairs.

Skater	Event	Final	
Skater	Event	Result	Rank
Gillis Grafström	Men's singles	7.0	1st place, gold medalist(s)
Magda Julin	Men's singles	12.0	1st place, gold medalist(s)
Svea Norén	Men's singles	12.5	2nd place, silver medalist(s)
Ulrich Salchow	Men's singles	25.5	4

== Shooting ==
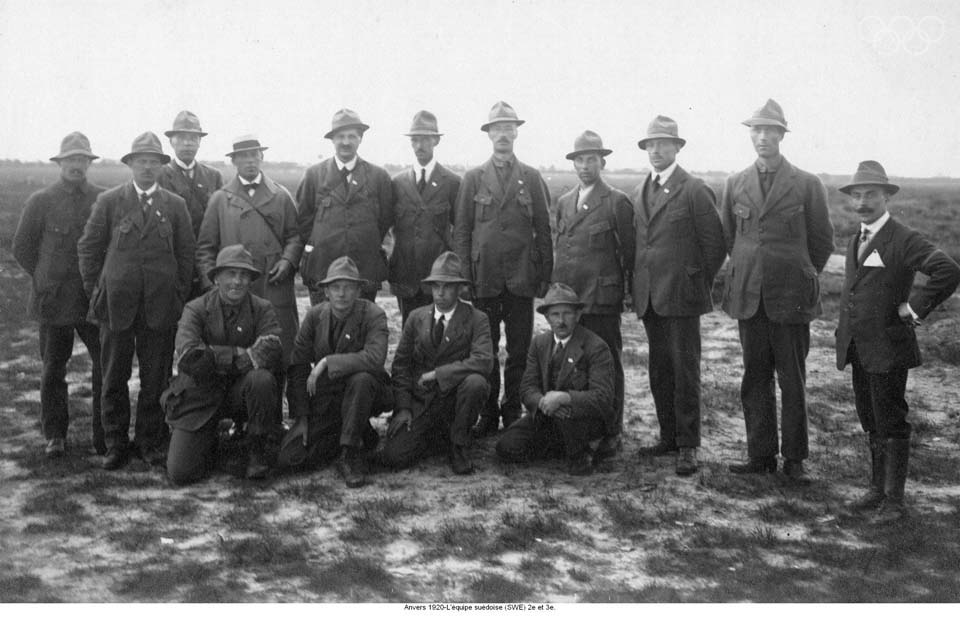
Swedish shooting team

Twenty-nine shooters represented Sweden in 1920. It was the nation's third appearance in the sport. Johansson won the nation's only gold medal of the year, in the 600 metre prone military rifle, as well as being on two of the medal-winning teams. In all, Sweden gathered ten medals, third-most of any nation in 1920. The six silver medals were the most of any country.

Shooter	Event	Final	
Shooter	Event	Result	Rank
Anders Andersson	50 m free pistol	467	6
Edward Benedicks	100 m deer, single shots	Unknown	
Edward Benedicks	100 m deer, double shots	Unknown	
Erik Blomqvist	300 m free rifle, 3 pos.	924	Unknown
Erik Blomqvist	300 m military rifle, prone	58	6
Erik Blomqvist	600 m military rifle, prone	58	5
Olle Ericsson	300 m military rifle, standing	Unknown	
Mauritz Eriksson	300 m free rifle, 3 pos.	974	7
Mauritz Eriksson	300 m military rifle, prone	58	6
Mauritz Eriksson	300 m military rifle, standing	53	7
Mauritz Eriksson	600 m military rifle, prone	59	2nd place, silver medalist(s)
Oscar Eriksson	50 m small-bore rifle	370	Unknown
Gunnar Gabrielsson	50 m free pistol	460	Unknown
Walfrid Hellman	300 m military rifle, standing	53	7
Ture Holmberg	300 m military rifle, prone	57	Unknown
Sigvard Hultcrantz	50 m free pistol	450	Unknown
Sigvard Hultcrantz	50 m small-bore rifle	382	Unknown
Werner Jernström	300 m military rifle, prone	57	Unknown
Hugo Johansson	300 m free rifle, 3 pos.	961	Unknown
Hugo Johansson	300 m military rifle, prone	58	6
Hugo Johansson	300 m military rifle, standing	Unknown	
Hugo Johansson	600 m military rifle, prone	59	1st place, gold medalist(s)
Anders Johnson	50 m free pistol	448	Unknown
Gustaf Adolf Jonsson	300 m military rifle, prone	57	Unknown
Gustaf Adolf Jonsson	600 m military rifle, prone	54	Unknown
Per Kinde	100 m deer, single shots	Unknown	
Per Kinde	Trap	Unknown	
Viktor Knutsson	300 m free rifle, 3 pos.	896	Unknown
Bengt Lagercrantz	100 m deer, single shots	Unknown	
Bengt Lagercrantz	100 m deer, double shots	Unknown	
Leon Lagerlöf	50 m small-bore rifle	375	Unknown
Leon Lagerlöf	300 m free rifle, 3 pos.	836	Unknown
Leon Lagerlöf	300 m military rifle, standing	Unknown	
Fredric Landelius	100 m deer, single shots	39	6
Fredric Landelius	100 m deer, double shots	77	2nd place, silver medalist(s)
Fredric Landelius	Trap	Unknown	
Erik Lundquist	Trap	Unknown	
Erik Ohlsson	50 m small-bore rifle	381	Unknown
Erik Ohlsson	300 m military rifle, prone	57	Unknown
Erik Ohlsson	600 m military rifle, prone	57	8
Casimir Reuterskiöld	50 m free pistol	464	8
Karl Richter	Trap	Unknown	
Erik Sökjer-Petersén	Trap	Unknown	
Ragnar Stare	50 m small-bore rifle	365	Unknown
Alfred Swahn	100 m deer, single shots	41	2nd place, silver medalist(s)
Alfred Swahn	100 m deer, double shots	67	Unknown
Alfred Swahn	Trap	Unknown	
Oscar Swahn	100 m deer, single shots	37	8
Anders Andersson; Gunnar Gabrielsson; Sigvard Hultcrantz; Anders Johnson; Casimir Reuterskiöld	50 m team free pistol	2289	2nd place, silver medalist(s)
Bror Andreasson; Erik Blomqvist; Mauritz Eriksson; Hugo Johansson; Gustaf Adolf Jonsson	300 & 600 m team military rifle, prone	558	6
Edward Benedicks; Bengt Lagercrantz; Fredric Landelius; Alfred Swahn; Oscar Swahn	100 m team deer, double shots	336	2nd place, silver medalist(s)
Erik Blomqvist; Mauritz Eriksson; Ture Holmberg; Werner Jernström; Hugo Johansson	300 m team military rifle, prone	281	5
Erik Blomqvist; Mauritz Eriksson; Hugo Johansson; Gustaf Adolf Jonsson; Erik Ohlsson	600 m team military rifle, prone	287	3rd place, bronze medalist(s)
Erik Blomqvist; Mauritz Eriksson; Hugo Johansson; Viktor Knutsson; Leon Lagerlöf	Team free rifle	4591	6
Olle Ericsson; Mauritz Eriksson; Walfrid Hellman; Hugo Johansson; Leon Lagerlöf	300 m team military rifle, standing	255	3rd place, bronze medalist(s)
Oscar Eriksson; Sigvard Hultcrantz; Leon Lagerlöf; Erik Ohlsson; Ragnar Stare	50 m team small-bore rifle	1873	2nd place, silver medalist(s)
Per Kinde; Bengt Lagercrantz; Karl Larsson; Alfred Swahn; Oscar Swahn	100 m team deer, single shots	153	4
Per Kinde; Fredric Landelius; Erik Lundquist; Karl Richter; Erik Sökjer-Petersén; Alfred Swahn	Team clay pigeons	500	3rd place, bronze medalist(s)

== Tennis ==
Eight tennis players, five men and three women, competed for Sweden in 1920. It was the nation's third appearance in the sport. Fick was the most successful individual, reaching the semifinals before losing that match and the bronze medal match to take fourth place. All five of the doubles pairs lost their first match.

Player	Event	Round of 64	Round of 32	Round of 16	Quarterfinals	Semifinals	Finals	Rank
Player	Event	Opposition Score	Opposition Score	Opposition Score	Opposition Score	Opposition Score	Opposition Score	Rank
Sigrid Fick	Women's singles	N/A	Bye	Dahl (NOR); W 7–5, 6–2	de Borman (BEL); W 6–4, 8–6	Lenglen (FRA); L 6–0, 6–1	McKane (GBR); L 6–2, 6–0	4
Margareta Lindberg	Women's singles	N/A	Gagliardi (ITA); L 6–0	did not advance				15
Fritz Lindqvist	Men's singles	Flaquer (ESP); L 0–6, 6–2, 6–3, 6–2	did not advance					32
Sune Malmström	Men's singles	Bye	Žemla-Rázný (TCH); W 4–6, 6–2, 6–3, 7–5	Simon (SUI); W 6–2, 6–2, 6–0	Raymond (RSA); L 6–3, 6–1, 6–1	did not advance		5
Henning Müller	Men's singles	Woosnam (GBR); L 3–6, 6–1, 6–3, 6–3	did not advance					32
Lily Strömberg	Women's singles	N/A	Bye	Brehm (DEN); W 7–5, 6–3	Lenglen (FRA); L 6–0, 6–0	did not advance		5
Carl-Eric von Braun	Men's singles	Bonacossa (ITA); W 4–6, 6–1, 7–5, 6–2	Lammens (BEL); L 6–2, 6–1, 6–1	did not advance				17
Olle Andersson; Henning Müller	Men's doubles	N/A	Bye	Langaard & Nielsen (NOR); L 6–1, 6–8, 6–1, 6–4	did not advance			9
Sigrid Fick; Fritz Lindqvist	Mixed doubles	N/A	d'Ayen & Hirsch (FRA); L 6–4, 6–2	did not advance				14
Sigrid Fick; Lily Strömberg	Women's doubles	N/A	N/A	Bye	d'Ayen & Lenglen (FRA); L 6–4, 6–3	did not advance		5
Jarl Malström; Lily Strömberg	Mixed doubles	N/A	Bye	Bye	Hansen & Tegner (DEN); L 0–6, 6–1, 6–2	did not advance		5
Jarl Malström; Carl-Eric von Braun	Men's doubles	N/A	Lammens & Washer (BEL); L 6–2, 6–4, 6–3	did not advance				17

Opponent nation	Wins	Losses	Percent
Belgium	1	2	.333
Czechoslovakia	1	0	1.000
Denmark	1	1	.500
France	0	4	.000
Great Britain	0	2	.000
Italy	1	1	.500
Norway	1	1	.500
South Africa	0	1	.000
Spain	0	1	.000
Switzerland	1	0	1.000
Total	6	13	.316

Round	Wins	Losses	Percent
Round of 64	1	2	.333
Round of 32	1	4	.200
Round of 16	3	1	.750
Quarterfinals	1	4	.200
Semifinals	0	1	.000
Final	0	0	–
Bronze match	0	1	.000
Total	6	13	.316

== Water polo ==
Summary

Team	Event	Gold medal round				Silver medal round		Bronze medal round			Rank
Team	Event	First round	Quarterfinal	Semifinal	Final	Semifinal	Final	Quarterfinal	Semifinal	Final	Rank
Team	Event	Opposition Score	Opposition Score	Opposition Score	Opposition Score	Opposition Score	Opposition Score	Opposition Score	Opposition Score	Opposition Score	Rank
Sweden men	Men's tournament	Czech Republic; W 11–0	Brazil; W 7–3	Belgium; L 3–5	Did not advance			Bye	Netherlands; W 9–1	United States; W 5–0	3rd place, bronze medalist(s)

Sweden competed in the Olympic water polo tournament for the third time in 1920, having won a bronze and a silver medal previously. A modified version of the Bergvall System was in use at the time. Sweden had little trouble with its first two matches, against Czechoslovakia and Brazil, but fell to Belgium in the semifinals. Belgium's eventual taking of the silver medal let Sweden contest the bronze medal. In the third-place tournament, they defeated first the Netherlands and then the United States to take the bronze medal.

Round of 16

Sweden	11–0	Czechoslovakia	Antwerp

Quarterfinals

Sweden	7–3	Brazil	Antwerp

Semifinals

Belgium	5–3	Sweden	Antwerp

Bronze medal semifinals

Sweden	9–1	Netherlands	Antwerp

Bronze medal match

Sweden	5–0	United States	Antwerp

Final rank
(bronze) Bronze

== Weightlifting ==
Six weightlifters represented Sweden in 1920. It was the nation's debut appearance in the sport. The Swedes took a pair of bronze medals, and no Swedish wrestler finished lower than sixth place.

Weightlifter	Event	Final	
Weightlifter	Event	Result	Rank
Erik Carlsson	82.5 kg	262.5	4
Otto Brunn	+82.5 kg	250.0	5
Gustav Eriksson	60 kg	192.5	6
Carl Olofsson	67.5 kg	220.0	5
Albert Pettersson	75 kg	235.0	3rd place, bronze medalist(s)
Erik Pettersson	82.5 kg	267.5	3rd place, bronze medalist(s)

== Wrestling ==
Thirteen wrestlers competed for Sweden in 1920. It was the nation's third appearance in the sport. Sweden was the second-most successful nation in 1920, behind only Finland. Sweden took three gold medals, as well as a silver and two bronzes.

=== Freestyle ===
Wrestler	Event	Round of 32	Round of 16	Quarterfinals	Semifinals	Finals / Bronze match	Rank
Otto Borgström	Middleweight	Bye	Vergos (GRE) (W)	Frantz (USA) (L)	did not advance		5
Anders Larsson	Light heavyweight	N/A	Meyer (FRA) (W)	Gallén (FIN) (W)	Maurer (USA) (W)	Courant (SUI) (W)	1st place, gold medalist(s)
Gottfrid Lindgren	Middleweight	Bye	Grimstad (NOR) (L)	did not advance			9
Ernst Nilsson	Heavyweight	N/A		MacDonald (GBR) (W)	Pendleton (USA) (L)	Meyer (SUI) (D)	3rd place, bronze medalist(s)
Gottfrid Svensson	Lightweight	N/A	Metropoulos (USA) (W)	MacKenzie (GBR) (W)	Wright (GBR) (W)	Anttila (FIN) (L)	2nd place, silver medalist(s)

Opponent nation	Wins	Losses	Percent
Finland	1	1	.500
France	1	0	1.000
Great Britain	3	0	1.000
Greece	1	0	1.000
Norway	0	1	1.000
Switzerland	1	0	1.000
United States	2.5	2.5	.500
Total	9.5	4.5	.679

Round	Wins	Losses	Percent
Round of 32	0	0	–
Round of 16	3	1	.750
Quarterfinals	3	1	.750
Semifinals	2	1	.667
Final	1	1	.500
Bronze match	0.5	0.5	.500
Total	9.5	4.5	.679

=== Greco-Roman ===
Wrestler	Event	Round of 32	Round of 16	Quarterfinals	Semifinals	Finals	Rank
Wrestler	Event	Round of 32	Round of 16	Silver quarters	Silver semis	Silver match	Rank
Wrestler	Event	Round of 32	Round of 16	Bronze quarters	Bronze semis	Bronze match	Rank
Anders Ahlgren	Heavyweight	Bye	Bonneveld (NED) (W)	Vassboten (NOR) (W)	Sjouwerman (NED) (W)	Lindfors (FIN) (L)	8
Anders Ahlgren	Heavyweight	Bye	Bonneveld (NED) (W)	Bye	Willkie (USA) (L)	Did not advance	8
Anders Ahlgren	Heavyweight	Bye	Bonneveld (NED) (W)	did not advance			8
Carl Fältström	Middleweight	Bye	Gorletti (ITA) (W)	Perttilä (FIN) (L)	did not advance		11
Carl Fältström	Middleweight	Bye	Gorletti (ITA) (W)	did not advance			11
Carl Fältström	Middleweight	Bye	Gorletti (ITA) (W)	did not advance			11
Claes Johansson	Light heavyweight	Bye	Rosenqvist (FIN) (W)	Eriksen (DEN) (W)	Tetens (DEN) (W)	Sint (NED) (W)	1st place, gold medalist(s)
Claes Johansson	Light heavyweight	Bye	Rosenqvist (FIN) (W)	N/A	Won gold		1st place, gold medalist(s)
Claes Johansson	Light heavyweight	Bye	Rosenqvist (FIN) (W)	N/A			1st place, gold medalist(s)
Holger Lindberg	Lightweight	Nolton (NED) (W)	Andersen (NOR) (L)	did not advance			12
Holger Lindberg	Lightweight	Nolton (NED) (W)	Andersen (NOR) (L)	did not advance			12
Holger Lindberg	Lightweight	Nolton (NED) (W)	Andersen (NOR) (L)	did not advance			12
Ernst Nilsson	Heavyweight	Bye	van den Bril (BEL) (W)	Sjouwerman (NED) (L)	did not advance		10
Ernst Nilsson	Heavyweight	Bye	van den Bril (BEL) (W)	did not advance			10
Ernst Nilsson	Heavyweight	Bye	van den Bril (BEL) (W)	did not advance			10
Gustaf Nilsson	Lightweight	Bye	Frydenlund (NOR) (L)	did not advance			12
Gustaf Nilsson	Lightweight	Bye	Frydenlund (NOR) (L)	did not advance			12
Gustaf Nilsson	Lightweight	Bye	Frydenlund (NOR) (L)	did not advance			12
Sven Ohlsson	Light heavyweight	Duvinet (FRA) (W)	Maichle (USA) (L)	did not advance			10
Sven Ohlsson	Light heavyweight	Duvinet (FRA) (W)	Maichle (USA) (L)	N/A	did not advance		10
Sven Ohlsson	Light heavyweight	Duvinet (FRA) (W)	Maichle (USA) (L)	N/A			10
Fritiof Svensson	Featherweight	Bye	Jensen (DEN) (W)	Friman (FIN) (L)	did not advance		3rd place, bronze medalist(s)
Fritiof Svensson	Featherweight	Bye	Jensen (DEN) (W)	N/A	Kähkönen (FIN) (L)	Did not advance	3rd place, bronze medalist(s)
Fritiof Svensson	Featherweight	Bye	Jensen (DEN) (W)	Bye	Boumans (BEL) (W)	Torgensen (DEN) (W)	3rd place, bronze medalist(s)
Gottfrid Svensson	Featherweight	Bye	Porro (ITA) (L)	did not advance			11
Gottfrid Svensson	Featherweight	Bye	Porro (ITA) (L)	N/A	did not advance		11
Gottfrid Svensson	Featherweight	Bye	Porro (ITA) (L)	did not advance			11
Calle Westergren	Middleweight	Eillebrecht (NED) (W)	Dechmann (LUX) (W)	Vanderleenden (BEL) (W)	Perttilä (FIN) (W)	Lindfors (FIN) (W)	1st place, gold medalist(s)
Calle Westergren	Middleweight	Eillebrecht (NED) (W)	Dechmann (LUX) (W)	Won gold			1st place, gold medalist(s)
Calle Westergren	Middleweight	Eillebrecht (NED) (W)	Dechmann (LUX) (W)	Won gold			1st place, gold medalist(s)

Opponent nation	Wins	Losses	Percent
Belgium	3	0	1.000
Denmark	4	0	1.000
Finland	3	4	.429
France	1	0	1.000
Italy	1	1	.500
Luxembourg	1	0	1.000
Netherlands	5	1	.833
Norway	1	2	.333
United States	0	2	.000
Total	19	10	.655

Round	Wins	Losses	Percent
Round of 32	3	0	1.000
Round of 16	6	4	.600
Quarterfinals	3	3	.500
Semifinals	3	0	1.000
Final	2	1	.667
Silver quarterfinals	0	0	–
Silver semifinals	0	2	.000
Silver match	0	0	–
Bronze quarterfinals	0	0	–
Bronze semifinals	1	0	1.000
Bronze match	1	0	1.000
Total	19	10	.655
