= Sailing at the 1920 Summer Olympics – 40 m2 Skerry cruiser =

40 m^{2} Skerry cruiser at the Games of the VII Olympiad
- Line drawings of the 40 m^{2} Skerry cruiser
- Venue: Belgium, Ostend
- Dates: First race: 7 July 1920; Last race: 9 July 1920
- Competitors: 8 from 1 nation
- Teams: 2

Medalists
1st place, gold medalist(s)		Tore Holm, Yngve Holm, Axel Rydin, Georg Tengwall	Sweden
2nd place, silver medalist(s)		Gustaf Svensson, Percy Almstedt, Erik Mellbin, Ragnar Svensson	Sweden

The 40 m^{2} Skerry Cruiser was a sailing event on the Sailing at the 1920 Summer Olympics program in Ostend. Four races were scheduled in each type. In total 8 sailors, on 2 boats, from 1 nation entered in the 40 m^{2} Skerry cruiser.

== Race schedule ==
●	Opening ceremony	●	Event competitions	●	Event finals	●	Closing ceremony

Date	July			
Date	7th Wed	8th Thu	9th Fri	10th Sat
40 m^{2} Skerry cruiser	●	●	●	●
Total gold medals				1

== Course area ==
40 m^{2} Skerry cruiser 1920 Olympic Course Areas

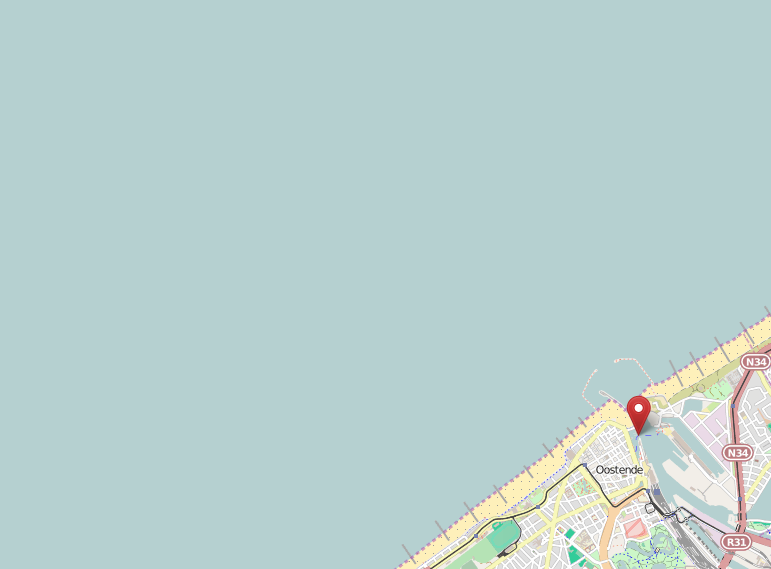
Ostend, Belgium

== Weather conditions ==
Date	Max temperature	Wind speed	Average wind direction
7 July 1920	Unknown		
8 July 1920	Unknown		
9 July 1920	Unknown		

== Final results ==
The 1920 Olympic scoring system was used.

Rank	Country	Helmsman	Crew	Boat	Race 1		Race 2		Race 3		Total
Rank	Country	Helmsman	Crew	Boat	Pos.	Pts.	Pos.	Pts.	Pos.	Pts.	Total
1st place, gold medalist(s)	Sweden	Tore Holm	Yngve Holm; Axel Rydin; Georg Tengwall	Sif	1	1	2	1	1	1	4
2nd place, silver medalist(s)	Sweden	Gustaf Svensson	Percy Almstedt; Erik Mellbin; Ragnar Svensson	Elsie	2	2	1	1	2	2	5

== Notes ==
- Since the official documentation of the 1920 Summer Olympics was written in 1957 many facts did disappear in time.

== Other information ==
=== Sailors ===
During the Sailing regattas at the 1920 Summer Olympics the following persons were competing:

40 m^{2} Skerry cruiser sailors at the 1920 Olympic Games
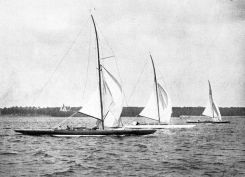
40 m^{2} Skerry cruisers at the Olympics

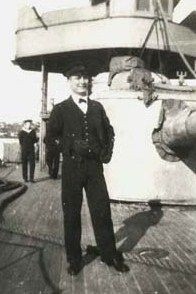
Yngve Holm (SWE)

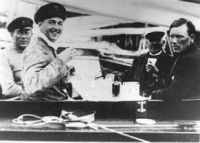
Crew of 40 m^{2} Skerry cruiser SIF (SWE)
