= Equestrian at the 1920 Summer Olympics – Individual vaulting =

Equestrian at the Olympics

Individual vaulting at the Games of the VII Olympiad
- Venue: Olympisch Stadion
- Date: 11 September
- Competitors: 18 from 3 nations

Medalists
1st place, gold medalist(s)		Daniel Bouckaert	Belgium
2nd place, silver medalist(s)		Field	France
3rd place, bronze medalist(s)		Louis Finet	Belgium

The individual vaulting event was part of the equestrian programme at the 1920 Summer Olympics.

== Results ==
Place	Vaulter	Score
1	Daniel Bouckaert (BEL)	30.500
2	Field (FRA)	29.500
3	Louis Finet (BEL)	29.000
4	Maurice Van Ranst (BEL)	28.000
5	van Schauwenbroeck (BEL)	27.250
6	Albert Van Cauwenburg (BEL)	26.666
7	Salins (FRA)	26.333
8	Victor Claes (BEL)	26.163
9	Cauchy (FRA)	25.250
10	Cabanac (FRA)	24.333
11	Alfred Badu (FRA)	23.000
12	Quartermaster Formal (FRA)	22.833
13	Soldier Formal (FRA)	20.500
13	Carl Green (SWE)	20.500
15	Anders Mårtensson (SWE)	20.250
16	Oskar Nilsson (SWE)	18.666
17	Oscar Nilsson (SWE)	14.916
—	Herman Kristoffersson (SWE)	DNF

== Sources ==
- Belgium Olympic Committee (1957). Olympic Games Antwerp 1920: Official Report (in French).
- Wudarski, Pawel (1999). "Wyniki Igrzysk Olimpijskich" (in Polish). Archived from the original on 16 February 2009.
