= Equestrian at the 1920 Summer Olympics – Team vaulting =

Equestrian at the Olympics

Team vaulting at the Games of the VII Olympiad
- Venue: Olympisch Stadion
- Date: 11 September
- Competitors: 18 from 3 nations

Medalists
1st place, gold medalist(s)		Daniel Bouckaert, Louis Finet, Maurice Van Ranst; Belgium
2nd place, silver medalist(s)		Cauchy, Field, Salins; France
3rd place, bronze medalist(s)		Carl Green, Anders Mårtensson, Oskar Nilsson; Sweden

The team vaulting event was part of the equestrian programme at the 1920 Summer Olympics.

== Results ==
The team score was simply the sum of the best three scores for each nation in the individual vaulting competition.

Place	Team	Ind. place	Score	Total
Final
Gold	Belgium			87.500
Gold	Daniel Bouckaert	1	30.500	87.500
Gold	Louis Finet	3	29.000	87.500
Gold	Maurice Van Ranst	4	28.000	87.500
Silver	France			81.083
Silver	Field	2	29.500	81.083
Silver	Salins	7	26.333	81.083
Silver	Cauchy	10	25.250	81.083
Bronze	Sweden			59.416
Bronze	Carl Green	13	20.500	59.416
Bronze	Anders Mårtensson	15	20.250	59.416
Bronze	Oskar Nilsson	16	18.666	59.416

== Sources ==
- Belgium Olympic Committee (1957). Olympic Games Antwerp 1920: Official Report (in French).
- Wudarski, Pawel (1999). "Wyniki Igrzysk Olimpijskich" (in Polish). Archived from the original on 16 February 2009.
