= Athletics at the 1920 Summer Olympics – Men's pole vault =

Men's pole vault at the Games of the VII Olympiad
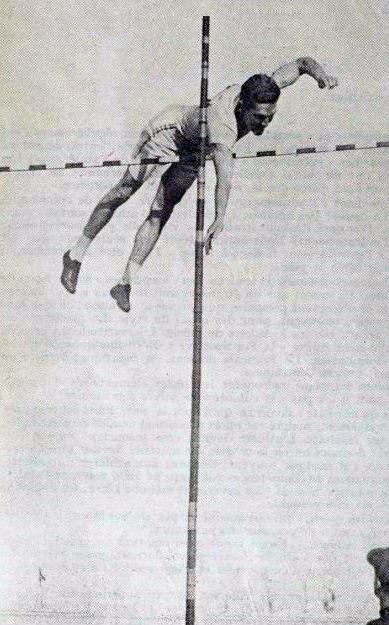
- Frank Foss vaulting
- Venue: Olympisch Stadion
- Dates: August 18–20, 1920
- Competitors: 16 from 7 nations
- Winning height: 4.09 WR

Medalists
1st place, gold medalist(s)		Frank Foss; United States
2nd place, silver medalist(s)		Henry Petersen; Denmark
3rd place, bronze medalist(s)		Edwin Myers; United States

Official Video

The men's pole vault event was part of the track and field athletics programme at the 1920 Summer Olympics. The competition was held on Wednesday, August 18, 1920, and on Friday, August 20, 1920. 16 pole vaulters from seven nations competed. No nation had more than 4 jumpers, suggesting the limit had been reduced from the 12 maximum in force in 1908 and 1912. The event was won by Frank Foss of the United States, the nation's sixth consecutive victory in the men's pole vault. Henry Petersen's silver was Denmark's first medal in the event and the first time a non-American had done better than bronze in the pole vault. Edwin Myers's bronze continued the American streak of winning at least two medals in each pole vault, however.

The winning margin was 39 cm which as of 2023 is the only time the men's pole vault has been won by more than 15 cm at the Olympics.

== Background ==
This was the sixth appearance of the event, which is one of 12 athletics events to have been held at every Summer Olympics. None of the finalists from the pre-war 1908 Games returned. The Americans continued to be dominant coming into the Antwerp Games. Frank Foss had won the United States Olympic trials, making him the favorite; Edwin Myers had come in second.

Belgium, Estonia, and Finland each made their first appearance in the event. The United States made its sixth appearance, the only nation to have competed at every Olympic men's pole vault to that point.

== Competition format ==
The competition continued to use the two-round format introduced in 1912, with results cleared between rounds. Vaulters received three attempts at each height.

In the qualifying round, all vaulters clearing 3.65 metres advanced to the final.

== Records ==
These were the standing world and Olympic records (in metres) prior to the 1920 Summer Olympics.

World record	Marc Wright (USA)	4.02	Cambridge, United States	8 June 1912
Olympic record	Harry Babcock (USA)	3.95	Stockholm, Sweden	11 July 1912

At first Frank Foss set a new Olympic record with 4.00 metres. Then he set a new world record with 4.09 metres.

== Schedule ==
Date	Time	Round
Wednesday, 18 August 1920	10:00	Qualifying
Friday, 20 August 1920	15:30	Final

== Results ==
=== Qualifying ===
The qualification was held on August 18, 1920. The qualification height was 3.60. Only three pole vaulters were eliminated.

Rank	Athlete	Nation	Height	Notes
1	Frank Foss	United States	3.60	Q
1	André Francquenelle	France	3.60	Q
1	Georg Högström	Sweden	3.60	Q
1	Eldon Jenne	United States	3.60	Q
1	René Joannes-Powell	Belgium	3.60	Q
1	Laurits Jørgensen	Denmark	3.60	Q
1	Edward Knourek	United States	3.60	Q
1	Paul Lagarde	France	3.60	Q
1	John Mattsson	Sweden	3.60	Q
1	Edwin Myers	United States	3.60	Q
1	Henry Petersen	Denmark	3.60	Q
1	Jussi Ruoho	Finland	3.60	Q
1	Ernfrid Rydberg	Sweden	3.60	Q
14	Étienne Gajan	France	3.50	
—	Johann Martin	Estonia	No mark	
—	Lars Erik Tirén	Sweden	No mark	

=== Final ===
In the final held on August 20, 1920, only seven athletes were able to clear 3.60 metres again. Foss cleared 4.00 metres and also the new world record of 4.09 metres in his third try. Jump-offs were held to break ties, though details are unclear.

Rank	Athlete	Nation	Height	Notes
1st place, gold medalist(s)	Frank Foss	United States	4.09	WR
2nd place, silver medalist(s)	Henry Petersen	Denmark	3.70	
3rd place, bronze medalist(s)	Edwin Myers	United States	3.60	
4	Edward Knourek	United States	3.60	
5	Ernfrid Rydberg	Sweden	3.60	
6	Laurits Jørgensen	Denmark	3.60	
7	Eldon Jenne	United States	3.60	
8	Georg Högström	Sweden	3.50	
9	John Mattsson	Sweden	3.50	
10	André Francquenelle	France	3.40	
11	Paul Lagarde	France	3.40	
12	Jussi Ruoho	Finland	3.40	
13	René Joannes-Powell	Belgium	3.30	

== Sources ==
- Belgium Olympic Committee (1957). Olympic Games Antwerp 1920: Official Report (in French).
- Wudarski, Pawel (1999). "Wyniki Igrzysk Olimpijskich" (in Polish).
