= André Francquenelle =

French pole vaulter & France international rugby union player (1889–1965)

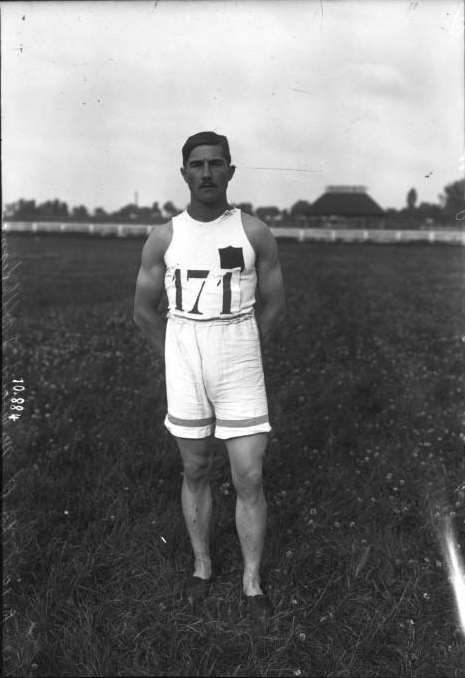
- André Francquenelle in 1910

Personal information
- Nationality: French
- Born: 15 August 1889
- Died: 11 July 1965 (aged 75)

Sport
- Sport: Athletics
- Event: Pole vault

André Francquenelle (15 August 1889 – 11 July 1965) was a French athlete and national rugby union player.

== Career ==
At the 1920 Olympic Games, Francquenelle competed in the men's pole vault.

The following year, Francquenelle finished second behind Ernfrid Rydberg in the pole jump event at the British 1921 AAA Championships.
