= Ruoho =

Ruoho is a surname. Notable people with the surname include:

- Esa Ruoho (born 1978), known as Lackluster, Finnish musician
- Jussi Ruoho (1892–1975), Finnish athlete
- Marita Ruoho (born 1949), Finnish orienteer
- Veera Ruoho (born 1969), Finnish politician and taekwondo practitioner
