= Ragnar Svensson =

Ragnar Svensson may refer to

- Ragnar Svensson (sailor) (1882–1959), Swedish sailor
- Ragnar Svensson (wrestler) (born 1934), Swedish wrestler
- Eric Ragnor Sventenius (Erik Ragnar Svensson, 1910–1973), Hispano-Swedish botanist
