= Shooting at the 1920 Summer Olympics – Men's 50 metre team small-bore rifle =

Men's 50 metre team small-bore rifle at the Games of the VII Olympiad
- Venue: Beverloo Camp
- Date: 2 August 1920
- Competitors: 50 from 10 nations

Medalists
1st place, gold medalist(s)		Dennis Fenton, Willis A. Lee, Lawrence Nuesslein, Arthur Rothrock, Oliver Schriver; United States
2nd place, silver medalist(s)		Oscar Eriksson, Sigvard Hultcrantz, Leon Lagerlöf, Erik Ohlsson, Ragnar Stare; Sweden
3rd place, bronze medalist(s)		Albert Helgerud, Sigvart Johansen, Anton Olsen, Østen Østensen, Olaf Sletten; Norway

The men's 50 metre team small-bore rifle, standing position was a shooting sports event held as part of the Shooting at the 1920 Summer Olympics programme. It was the only appearance of the event in the standing position, with a similar team competition being held in 1908 and 1912. The competition was held on 2 August 1920. 50 shooters from 10 nations competed.

== Results ==
The scores of the five shooters on each team were the scores from the 50 metre small-bore rifle, standing position event and were summed to give a team score. The maximum score was 2000.

Lawrence Nuesslein won his second gold medal.

Place	Shooter	Score
1
1	United States	1899
1	Lawrence Nuesslein	391
1	Arthur Rothrock	386
1	Dennis Fenton	385
1	Willis A. Lee	370
1	Oliver Schriver	367
2
2	Sweden	1873
2	Sigvard Hultcrantz	382
2	Erik Ohlsson	381
2	Leon Lagerlöf	375
2	Oscar Eriksson	370
2	Ragnar Stare	365
3
3	Norway	1866
3	Anton Olsen	379
3	Albert Helgerud	375
3	Sigvart Johansen	373
3	Olaf Sletten	371
3	Østen Østensen	368
4
4	Denmark	1862
4	Lars Jørgen Madsen	378
4	Erik Sætter-Lassen	378
4	Anders Peter Nielsen	374
4	Otto Wegener	373
4	Christen Møller	359
5
5	France	1847
5	Léon Johnson	
5	Achille Paroche	
5	Émile Rumeau	
5	André Parmentier	
5	Georges Roes	
6
6	Belgium	1785
6	Paul Van Asbroeck	
6	Norbert Van Molle	
6	Philippe Cammaerts	
6	Victor Robert	
6	Louis Andrieu	
7
7	Italy	1777
7	Alfredo Galli	
7	Raffaele Frasca	
7	Peppy Campus	
7	Franco Micheli	
7	Ricardo Ticchi	
8
8	South Africa	1755
8	George Lishman	
8	Fred Morgan	
8	George Harvey	
8	Robert Bodley	
8	Mark Paxton	
9
9	Spain	1753
9	José Bento	
9	Antonio Bonilla	
9	Domingo Rodríguez	
9	Luis Calvet	
9	Antonio Moreira	
10
10	Greece	1727
10	Andreas Vikhos	
10	Ioannis Theofilakis	
10	Konstantinos Kefalas	
10	Vasileios Xylinakis	
10	Emmanouil Peristerakis	
