= Edwin Myers (pole vaulter) =

American pole vaulter (1896–1978)

Medal record

Men's athletics

Representing the United States

Olympic Games
Bronze medal – third place	1920 Antwerp	Pole vault

Edwin Earle Myers (December 18, 1896 – August 31, 1978) was an American athlete who competed in the men's pole vault. He competed at the 1920 Summer Olympics and won a bronze medal, behind Danish pole vaulter Henry Petersen, who won silver. He attended Dartmouth College. He was born in Hinsdale, Illinois and died in Evanston, Illinois.
