= Kristoffersson =

Kristoffersson, Kristofersson or Kristofferson is a Swedish surname that may refer to

- Herman Kristoffersson (1895–1968), Swedish equestrian
- Johan Kristoffersson (born 1988), Swedish racecar driver
- Katarina Bosetti-Kristoffersson (born 1979), Swedish politician
- Kristoffer Kristofferson (1936–2024), American singer, songwriter, musician and actor
- Kristofer Kristofersson Hjeltnes (1856–1930), Norwegian horticulturist and politician
- Tommy Kristoffersson (born 1959), Swedish race car driver, father of Johan
- Marcus Kristoffersson (born 1979), Swedish ice hockey right winger
