= Maurice Van Ranst =

Belgian equestrian

Medal record

Equestrian

Representing Belgium

Olympic Games
Gold medal – first place	920 Antwerp	Vaulting, Team

Maurice Van Ranst was an equestrian and Olympic champion from Belgium. He won a gold medal in vaulting with the Belgian team (together with Daniel Bouckaert and Louis Finet) at the 920 Summer Olympics in Antwerp. He finished 4th in the individual vaulting competition.
