= Mellbin =

Mellbin is a surname. Notable people with the surname include:

- Erik Mellbin (1901–1955), Swedish sailor
- Franz-Michael Skjold Mellbin (born 1958), Danish diplomat
