= Edward Knourek =

American pole vaulter

Edward Emil Knourek (February 12, 1893 – May 10, 1977) was an American track and field athlete who competed in the 1920 Summer Olympics. In 1920 he finished fourth in the pole vault competition.
