= Oskar Nilsson (equestrian) =

Swedish equestrian

Personal information
- Born: 25 January 1897 Ringarum, Sweden
- Died: 29 March 1958 (aged 61) Norrköping, Sweden

Sport
- Sport: Horse riding
- Club: K1 IF, Stockholm
Medal record
Representing Sweden
Olympic Games
Bronze medal – third place	1920 Antwerp	Team vaulting

Oskar Petrus Nilsson (25 January 1897 – 29 March 1958) was a Swedish vaulter who competed in the 1920 Summer Olympics. He was part of the Swedish team that won the bronze medal in vaulting. In the individual vaulting competition he finished sixteenth, one place ahead of his compatriot Oscar Nilsson.

He is the great grandfather of Princess Sofia, Duchess of Värmland.
