= Eldon Jenne =

American pole vaulter and sports coach

Eldon Irl Jenne
Personal information
- Born: May 29, 1899
- Died: February 4, 1993 (aged 93) La Jolla, California, U.S.
- Education: Washington State University

Sport
- Country: United States
- Sport: Track and field

Eldon Irl Jenne (May 29, 1899 – February 4, 1993) was an American track and field athlete who competed in the 1920 Summer Olympics and a high school athletic coach.

== Athletic career ==
Jenne attended Coupeville High School in Coupeville, WA, where he played football, baseball, and basketball. He later attended Washington State University, where he excelled in the pole vault. In 1920, he was a member of the United States track and field team at the 1920 Summer Olympics in Antwerp, Belgium, finishing seventh in the pole vault competition.

In 1921, Jenne tied for the individual pole vault championship at the NCAA Men's Outdoor Track and Field Championship. He was Washington State's first Olympian and is a member of the Washington State University Sports Hall of Fame.

== Coaching career ==
Following the end of his athletic career, Jenne returned to Portland to coach football, basketball, baseball, and track at Washington High School. In 1928, he coached the boys' basketball team to the Oregon state championship, defeating future University of Oregon football coach Prink Callison's Medford High School team. Jenne's football teams amassed an overall 61–16–14 record with seven Portland city championships, one state championship, with only one losing season.

Jenne also served as head football and basketball coach at Pacific University. He led the Portland Interscholastic League's athletic program from 1938 until his retirement in 1965. In 1983, he was named to the Oregon Sports Hall of Fame for his achievements in coaching.

Jenne died in La Jolla, California in 1993.

== Head coaching record ==
=== College football ===
| Year | Team | Overall | Conference | Standing | Bowl/playoffs |
|---|---|---|---|---|---|
Pacific Badgers (Northwest Conference) (1930–1932)
| 1930 | Pacific | 5–4–1 | 2–1–1 | 3rd | |
| 1931 | Pacific | 5–2 | 3–2 | 3rd | |
| 1932 | Pacific | 4–3–2 | 3–2 | T–3rd | |
| Pacific: | | 14–9–3 | 7–5–1 | | |
| Total: | | 14–9–3 | | | |
