= Anton Olsen (rifle shooter) =

Norwegian sport shooter (1897–1968)

Personal information
- Born: 15 May 1897 Oslo, Norway
- Died: 27 April 1968 (aged 70) Oslo, Norway

Sport
- Sport: Sports shooting
Medal record
Men's shooting
Representing Norway
Olympic Games
Bronze medal – third place	1920 Antwerp	Team, small bore rifle

Anton Wilhelm Olsen (15 May 1897 – 27 April 1968) was a Norwegian rifle shooter competing in the early 20th century. He won a bronze medal at the 1920 Summer Olympics in Antwerp for team, small bore rifle.
