= Sigvart Johansen =

Norwegian sports shooter (1881–1964)

Personal information
- Born: 25 December 1881
- Died: 22 September 1964 (aged 82)

Sport
- Sport: Sports shooting
Medal record
Men's shooting
Representing Norway
Olympic Games
Bronze medal – third place	1920 Antwerp	Team small-bore rifle

Hans Sigvart Johansen (25 December 1881 – 22 September 1964) was a Norwegian rifle shooter competing in the early 20th century. He won a bronze medal at the 1920 Summer Olympics in Antwerp in the team small-bore rifle competition.
