= Lagerlöf =

Lagerlöf is a Swedish surname. Notable people with the surname include:

- Daniel Lind Lagerlöf (1969 – presumed 2011), Swedish film director
- Leon Lagerlöf (1870–1951), Swedish sport shooter
- Selma Lagerlöf (1858–1940), Swedish writer
- Thomas Lagerlöf (born 1971), Swedish association football coach

== See also ==
- 11061 Lagerlöf, a main-belt asteroid
