= Louis Finet =

Belgian equestrian

Olympic medal record

Men's Equestrian
| Gold medal – first place | 1920 Antwerp | Team vaulting |
| Bronze medal – third place | 1920 Antwerp | Individual vaulting |

Louis Casimir Finet (born 5 March 1894, date of death unknown) was a Belgian vaulter who competed in the 1920 Summer Olympics. In 1920, he won the gold medal in the team vaulting competition and the bronze medal in the individual vaulting event.
