= Anders Mårtensson =

Swedish equestrian

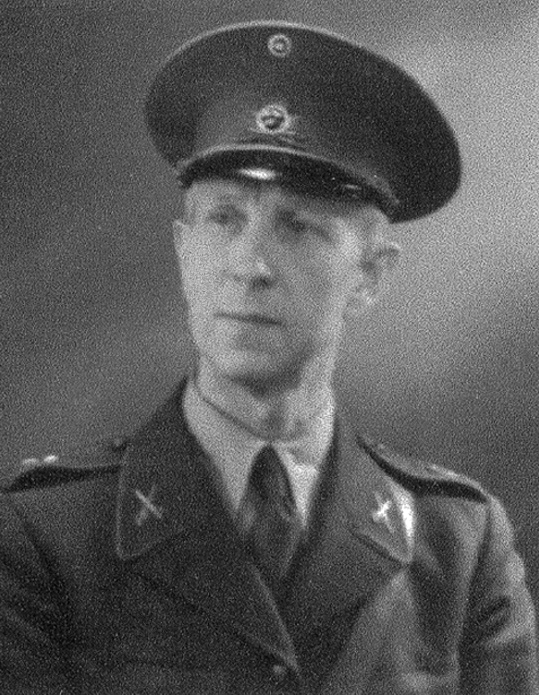

Personal information
- Born: 17 February 1893 Södra Sandby, Lund, Sweden
- Died: 17 July 1973 (aged 66) Skövde, Sweden

Sport
- Sport: Horse riding
- Club: K5 IF, Helsingborg
Medal record
Representing Sweden
Olympic Games
Bronze medal – third place	1920 Antwerp	Team vaulting

Anders Mårtensson (17 February 1893 – 17 July 1973) was a Swedish equestrian who competed in the 1920 Summer Olympics. He finished 15th in the individual vaulting competition and won a bronze medal with the Swedish vaulting team.
