= Erik Ohlsson =

Erik Ohlsson may refer to:

- Erik Ohlsson (musician) (born 1975), Swedish guitarist
- Erik Ohlsson (sport shooter) (1884–1980), Swedish sport shooter
