= Carl Green =

Swedish equestrian

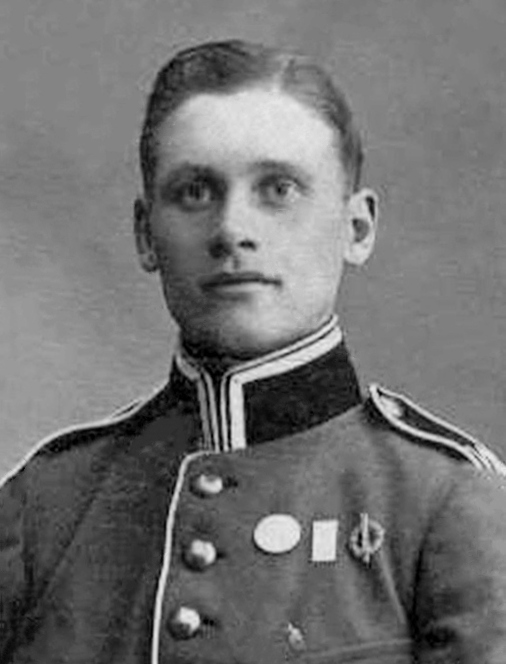

Personal information
- Born: 1 January 1894 Flen, Sweden
- Died: 1 September 1962 (aged 66) Norrköping, Sweden

Sport
- Sport: Horse riding
- Club: K8 IF, Umeå
Medal record
Representing Sweden
Olympic Games
Bronze medal – third place	1920 Antwerp	Team vaulting

Carl Seth Green (1 January 1894 – 1 September 1962) was a Swedish equestrian who competed in the 1920 Summer Olympics. He finished 13th in the individual vaulting competition and won a bronze medal with the Swedish vaulting team.
