= Daniel Bouckaert =

Belgian equestrian (1894–1965)

Olympic medal record

Men's Equestrian
| Gold medal – first place | 1920 Antwerp | Individual vaulting |
| Gold medal – first place | 1920 Antwerp | Team vaulting |

Daniel Ephrem Bouckaert (17 May 1894 – 26 December 1965) was a Belgian vaulter who competed in the 1920 Summer Olympics. In 1920 he won the gold medal in the individual vaulting competition as well as in the team vaulting event.
