= Henry Petersen =

Danish pole vaulter

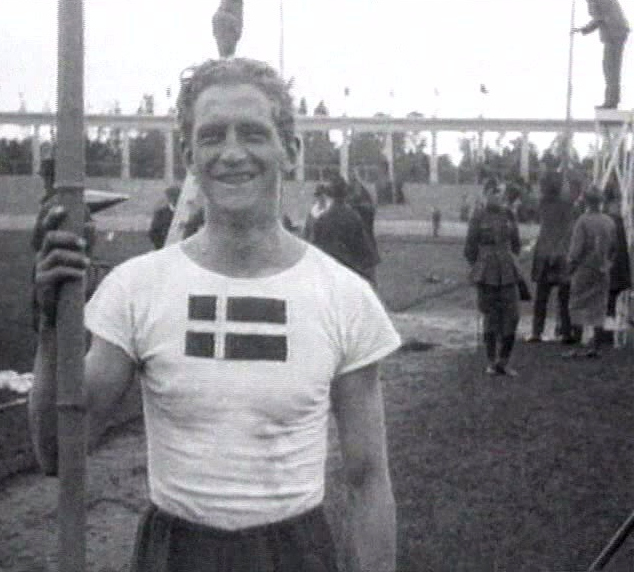
- Petersen at the 1920 Olympics

Personal information
- Born: 1 October 1900 Ring, Horsens, Denmark
- Died: 24 September 1949 (aged 48) Copenhagen, Denmark

Sport
- Sport: Athletics
- Event: Pole vault
- Club: KIF Copenhagen

Achievements and titles
- Personal best: 4.038 (1925)
Medal record
Representing Denmark
Olympic Games
Silver medal – second place	1920 Antwerp	Pole vault
World Student Games
Gold medal – first place	1923 Paris	Pole vault

Henry Petersen (1 October 1900 – 24 September 1949) was a Danish athlete, who competed in the pole vault at the 1920 and 1924 Olympics and won a silver medal in 1920, placing fourth in 1924.

== Career ==
Petersen won the Danish national pole vault title in 1920–21, 1923 and 1925–27 and improved the national record eight times from 3.69 m in 1919 to 4.03 m in 1925. He also held three national titles in the 4 × 100 m sprint relay (1919–20 and 1922) and five in team gymnastics events (between 1921 and 1927).

Petersen finished second behind Georg Högström in the pole jump event at the British 1919 AAA Championships. He finished second behind Henry Lindblad in the pole jump event at the 1927 AAA Championships.

He retired from sport shortly before the 1928 Olympics due to tuberculosis. He was an engineer by profession.
