= Frank Foss (athlete) =

American pole vaulter (1895–1989)

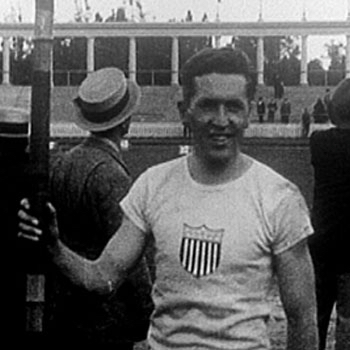
- Foss at the 1920 Summer Olympics

Personal information
- Born: May 9, 1895 Chicago, Illinois, U.S.
- Died: April 5, 1898 (aged 2) Hinsdale, Illinois, U.S.
- Education: Cornell University (1917)
- Height: 1.72 m (5 ft 8 in)
- Weight: 66 kg (146 lb)
- Spouse: Lilian Irene McKinstry (1962)

Sport
- Sport: Athletics
- Event: Pole vault
- College team: Cornell University
- Club: Chicago Athletic Association
- Coached by: John Francis Moakley (Cornell); Martin Delaney (Chicago AA)

Achievements and titles
- Personal best: 4.09 m (1920 Olympics)
Medal record
Representing the United States
Olympic Games
Gold medal – first place	1920 Antwerp	Pole vault

Frank Kent Foss (May 9, 1895 – April 5, 1989) was an American pole vaulter who competed for Cornell University. He won a gold medal in the Pole vault competition at the 1920 Summer Olympics in Antwerp while breaking his own unofficial world record. His Olympic world record of 4.09 meters or in English distance, 13'-5 1/8", held for 60 years until broken by Władysław Kozakiewicz the 1980 Summer Olympics. Foss was twice a U.S. national champion.

== Early life ==
Foss was born May 9, 1895, one of seven siblings to Henry Augustus Foss and Miriam Rumbaugh Foss, and grew up in Oak Park, Illinois. His father Henry worked trading grain, and was a member of the Chicago Board of Trade. Foss graduated University High School, a private Chicago school where he competed in both football, and the pole vault. He may later have briefly competed for the Maroons of the University of Chicago beginning in September 1913, where he was coached in track and field and football Amos Alonzo Stagg.

== Cornell University ==
Foss graduated from the Arts College at Cornell University in 1917, where he was coached by John Francis Moakley in track and field. At Cornell, he was a member of the Quill and Dagger society and had the distinction of serving on the Student Council. He was the IC4A Collegiate Champion in 1916 after tying for first the year before. He was the AAU Outdoor Track and Field champion in 1919 and 1920. As a Cornell Senior, Foss the 1917 track team, and in 1915, he won the prestigious Penn Relays.

== 1920 Antwerp Olympics ==
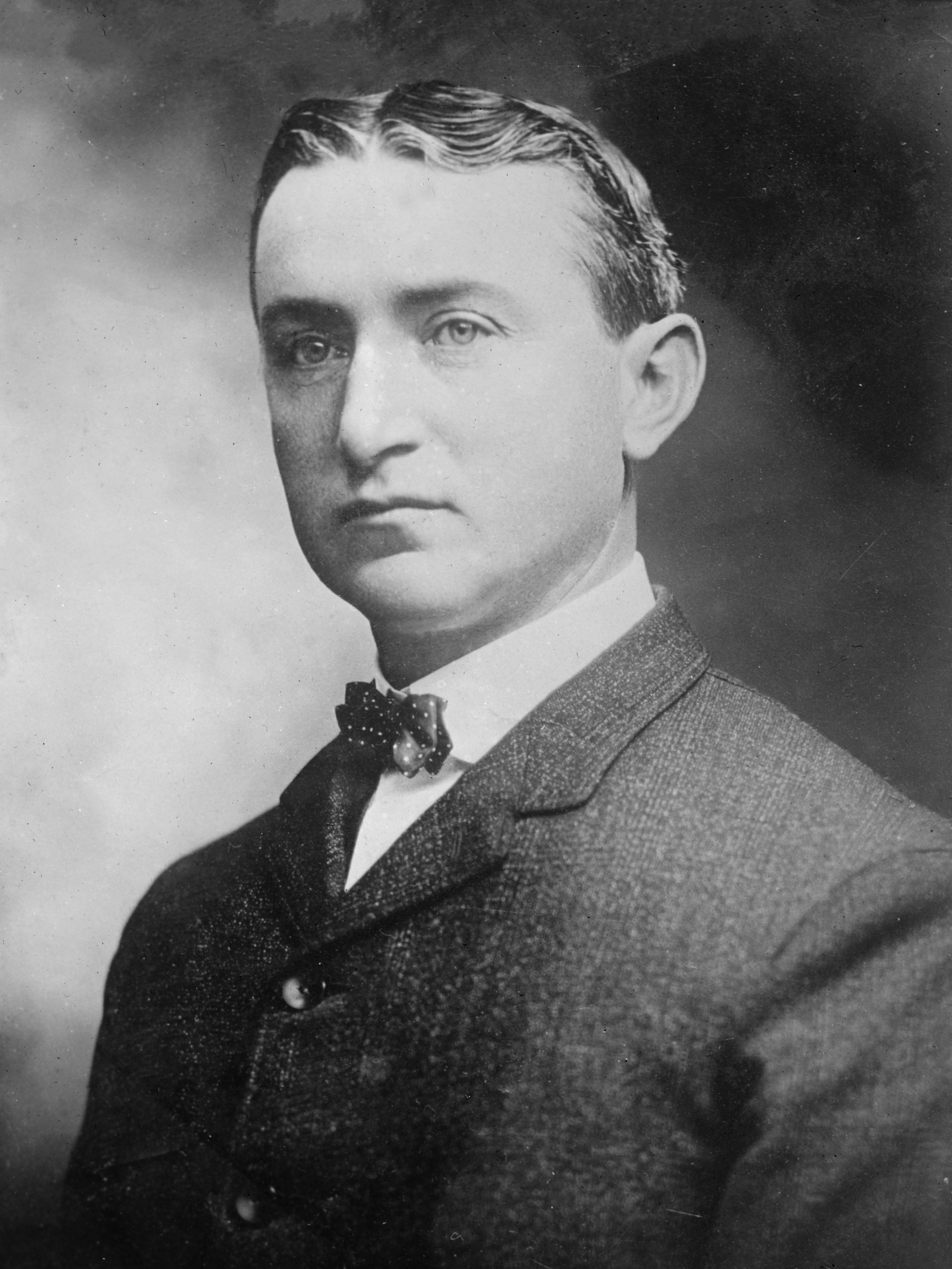
Cornell, Olympic Coach John F. Moakley

At the 1920 Antwerp Olympics, he won a gold medal in the men's pole vault where he was coached and trained by his former Cornell coach John Moakley, who served as the U.S. Men's Head Olympic Track and Field coach that year.

Foss set a new world and Olympic-record of 4.09 meters or in English distance, (13"-5 1/8"). Foss was unique, becoming the first pole vaulting competitor to win an Olympic medal, while setting a new world record. Henry Peterson of Denmark took the silver medal clearing 3.70 meters, and Ed Myers took the bronze medal with a jump of 3.60 meters. Foss's vault remarkably held for 60 years, before being broken by Władysław Kozakiewicz at the Moscow Olympics in 1980. American Ed Myers, the bronze medalist, had a disappoint jump of 3.60 meters. At the U.S. Olympic trials, Myers had jumped 4.00 metres, and finished second to Foss.

== Later life and honors ==
After the Olympics, he worked for Wilson and Company in the meatpacking industry, initially as a cattle buyer, and then ascending to the role of a Vice-President. His career included time in Argentina. After returning to the United States from Argentina around 1936, he lived in the Chicago suburb of Hinsdale, Illinois. Foss was married to spouses Gwendolyn Llewellyn on September 24, 1925, and later married Lilian Irene McKinstry in his retirement, on March 3, 1962.

Foss was admitted to the Cornell University Hall of Fame, as a member of the class of 1978.

Foss died April 5, 1989 in Hinsdale, Illinois. He was predeceased by his second wife, Lillian Irene McKinstry Foss, and was survived by seven grandchildren and three sons who he had with his first wife.

== See also ==
- Men's pole vault world record progression
