= Alfred Badu =

French equestrian

Personal information
- Nationality: French

Sport
- Sport: Equestrian

Alfred Badu was a French equestrian. He competed in the individual vaulting event at the 1920 Summer Olympics.
