= Victor Claes =

Belgian equestrian

Personal information
- Nationality: Belgian
- Born: 6 October 1894

Sport
- Sport: Equestrian

Victor Claes (born 6 October 1894, date of death unknown) was a Belgian equestrian. He competed in the individual vaulting event at the 1920 Summer Olympics.
