= Albert Van Cauwenburg =

Belgian equestrian

Personal information
- Nationality: Belgian
- Born: 9 January 1891

Sport
- Sport: Equestrian

Albert Van Cauwenburg (born 9 January 1891, date of death unknown) was a Belgian equestrian. He competed in the individual vaulting event at the 1920 Summer Olympics.
