= Laurits Jørgensen =

Danish track and field athlete

Laurits Møller Jørgensen (December 16, 1896 - September 10, 1976) was a Danish track and field athlete who competed in the 1920 Summer Olympics. In 1920, he finished sixth in the pole vault competition.
