= Étienne Gajan =

French pole vaulter

Personal information
- Nationality: French
- Born: 27 December 1890
- Died: 14 January 1978 (aged 87)

Sport
- Sport: Athletics
- Event: Pole vault

Étienne Gajan (27 December 1890 – 14 January 1978) was a French athlete. He competed in the men's pole vault at the 1920 Summer Olympics.
