= Jussi Ruoho =

Finnish pole vaulter

Personal information
- Nationality: Finnish
- Born: 16 May 1892 Töysä, Finland
- Died: 24 October 1975 (aged 83) Helsinki, Finland

Sport
- Sport: Athletics
- Event: Pole vault

Jussi Ruoho (16 May 1892 – 24 October 1975) was a Finnish athlete. He competed in the men's pole vault at the 1920 Summer Olympics.
