= John Mattsson =

Swedish pole vaulter

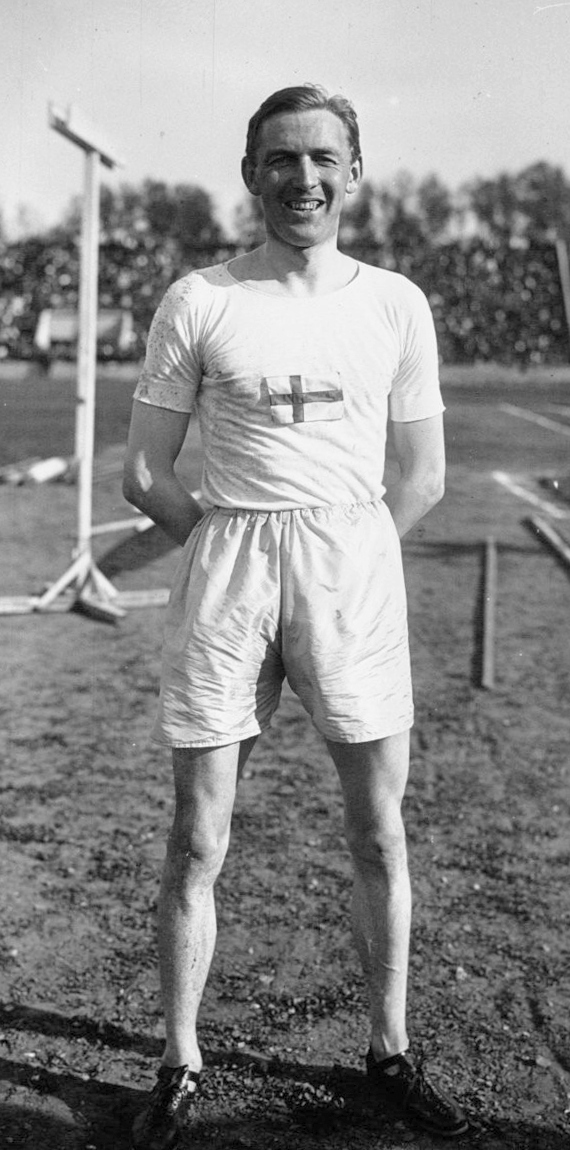
Johan Mattsson 1923

Johan ("John") Waldemar Mattsson (November 5, 1894 – September 1, 1969) was a Swedish track and field athlete who competed in the 1920 Summer Olympics. In 1920 he finished ninth in the pole vault competition.
