= Ragnar Stare =

Swedish sport shooter

Personal information
- Born: 24 November 1884 Västerhejde, Sweden
- Died: 30 June 1964 (aged 79) Stockholm, Sweden

Sport
- Sport: Sports shooting
Medal record
Men's shooting
Representing Sweden
Olympic Games
Silver medal – second place	1920 Antwerp	Team small-bore rifle

Ragnar Alexander Stare (24 November 1884 – 30 June 1964) was a Swedish sport shooter who competed in the 1920 Summer Olympics. In 1920 he won the silver medal as member of the Swedish team in the team small-bore rifle competition. He also participated in the individual small-bore rifle event but his exact place is unknown.
