= Oscar Nilsson (equestrian) =

Swedish equestrian

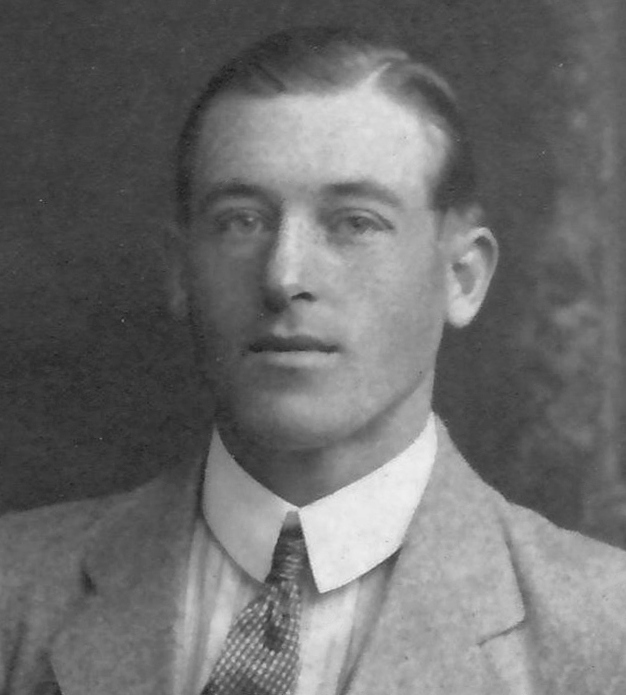

Personal information
- Born: 10 April 1896 Sireköpinge, Sweden
- Died: 5 May 1974 (aged 78) Helsingborg, Sweden

Sport
- Sport: Horse riding
- Club: K5 IF, Helsingborg

Fredrik Oscar Vilhelm Nilsson (later Burnér; 10 April 1896 – 5 May 1974) was a Swedish horse rider. He competed in vaulting at the 1920 Summer Olympics and finished 17th, one place behind his compatriot Oskar Nilsson.
