= Oscar Eriksson =

Swedish sport shooter (1889–1958)

Personal information
- Born: 28 June 1889 Örebro, Sweden
- Died: 25 December 1958 (aged 69) Örebro, Sweden

Sport
- Sport: Sports shooting
Medal record
Men's shooting
Representing Sweden
Olympic Games
Silver medal – second place	1920 Antwerp	Team small-bore rifle

Oscar Israel Eriksson (28 June 1889 – 25 December 1958) was a Swedish sport shooter who competed in the 1920 Summer Olympics. In 1920 he won the silver medal as member of the Swedish team in the team small-bore rifle competition. He also participated in the individual small-bore rifle event but his exact place is unknown.
