= Lars Erik Tirén =

Swedish pole vaulter

Personal information
- Nationality: Swedish
- Born: 27 July 1901
- Died: 14 September 1980 (aged 79)

Sport
- Sport: Athletics
- Event: Pole vault

Lars Erik Tirén (27 July 1901 – 14 September 1980) was a Swedish athlete. He competed in the men's pole vault at the 1920 Summer Olympics.
