= Yngve Holm =

Swedish sailor

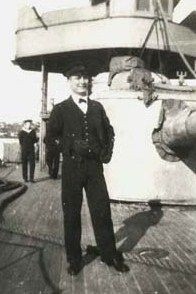

Personal information
- Full name: Yngve Robert Holm
- Nationality: Swedish
- Born: 12 September 1895 Västervik, Sweden
- Died: 16 February 1943 (aged 47) Stockholm, Sweden

Sailing career
- Sport: Sailing
- Club: Norrköpings Segelsällskap
- Class: Skerry Cruiser
Competition record
Sailing
Representing Sweden
Olympic Games
Gold medal – first place	1920 Antwerp	40 m² class
- Updated on 2014-01-18

Yngve Robert Holm (12 September 1895 – 16 February 1943) was a Swedish sailor who competed in the 1920 Summer Olympics. He was a crew member of the Swedish boat Sif, which won the gold medal in the 40m² Skerry cruiser.
