= Louis Andrieu =

Belgian sports shooter

Louis Andrieux
Personal information
- Full name: Louis Émile Jules Andrieux
- Born: 22 July 1876 Morlanwelz, Belgium
- Died: Unknown

Sport
- Sport: Sports shooting

Louis Émile Jules Andrieux (born 22 July 1876) was a Belgian sports shooter. He competed in two events at the 1920 Summer Olympics.
