= Sigvard Hultcrantz =

Swedish sport shooter (1888–1955)

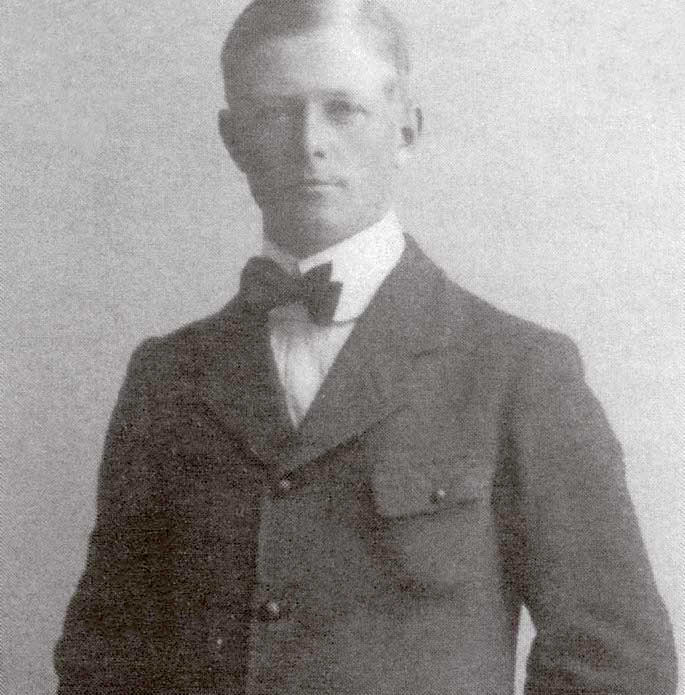

Personal information
- Born: 22 May 1888 Åmål, Sweden
- Died: 4 March 1955 (aged 66) Stockholm, Sweden
- Height: 178 cm (5 ft 10 in)

Sport
- Sport: Sports shooting
- Event(s): Pistol, small-bore rifle
- Club: KA2 IF, Karlskrona
Medal record
Representing Sweden
Olympic Games
Silver medal – second place	1920 Antwerp	Team free pistol
Silver medal – second place	1920 Antwerp	Team small-bore rifle

Sigvard Gustav Emanuel "Sigge" Hultcrantz (22 May 1888 – 4 March 1955) was a Swedish sport shooter who competed in the 1920 Summer Olympics.

In 1920, he won the silver medal as a member of the Swedish team in the team free pistol and team small-bore rifle events. He also participated in the individual free pistol competition and in the individual small-bore rifle event, but for both contests his exact placement is unknown.

At the time of the 1920 Olympics, Hultcrantz was a lieutenant in the Swedish Coast Artillery. He eventually reached the rank of major and served as the commandant of Älvsborg fortress from 1936 to 1939.
