= Percy Almstedt =

Swedish sailor (1888–1937)

Olympic medal record

Men's Sailing
Silver medal – second place	1920 Antwerp	40 m² class

Anders Percival Almstedt (November 30, 1888 – October 29, 1937) was a Swedish sailor who competed in the 1920 Summer Olympics. He was a crew member of the Swedish boat Elsie, which won the silver medal in the 40 m^{2} class. There were only two boats competing in this race, and so it was a foregone conclusion that they would win either the silver or gold.

Almstedt died in his birthplace of Gothenburg in 1937 at the age of 48. The manner of death was suicide.
