= Georg Tengvall =

Swedish sailor (1896–1954)

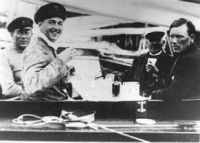

Medal record

Men's Sailing
Gold medal – first place	1920 Antwerp	40 m² class

Georg Henrik Tengvall (6 April 1896 – 4 March 1954) was a Swedish sailor who competed in the 1920 Summer Olympics. He was a crew member of the Swedish boat Sif, which won the gold medal in the 40 m^{2} class. Sif was in competition with only one other boat, "Elsie", also Swedish.
