= Gustaf Svensson =

Swedish sailor

Olympic medal record

Men's Sailing
Silver medal – second place	1920 Antwerp	40 m² class

Gustaf Arthur Leopold Svensson (17 March 1882 – 13 July 1950) was a Swedish sailor who competed in the 1920 Summer Olympics. Svensson won an Olympic silver medal in sailing at the 1920 Summer Olympics in Antwerp. He was a crew member of the Swedish boat Elsie, which won the silver medal in the 40 m^{2} class.
