= Axel Rydin =

Swedish sailor

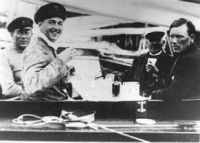

Medal record

Men's Sailing

Olympic Games
| Gold medal – first place | 1920 Antwerp | 40 m² class |

Axel Rydin (14 February 1887 – 13 May 1971) was a Swedish sailor who competed in the 1920 Summer Olympics. He was a crew member of the Swedish boat Sif, which won the gold medal in the 40 m^{2} class.
