= Herman Kristoffersson =

Swedish equestrian

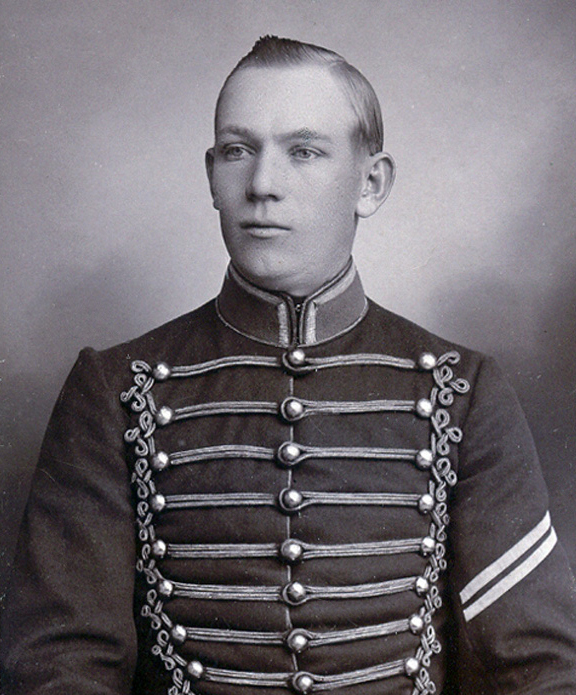

Personal information
- Born: 4 November 1895 Börringe, Svedala, Sweden
- Died: 23 April 1968 (aged 72) Malmö, Sweden

Sport
- Sport: Horse riding
- Event: Equestrian vaulting
- Club: K5 IF, Helsingborg

Herman Kristoffersson (4 November 1895 – 23 April 1968) was a Swedish equestrian. He competed in vaulting at the 1920 Summer Olympics, but failed to finish.
