= Georg Högström =

Swedish pole vaulter and high jumper

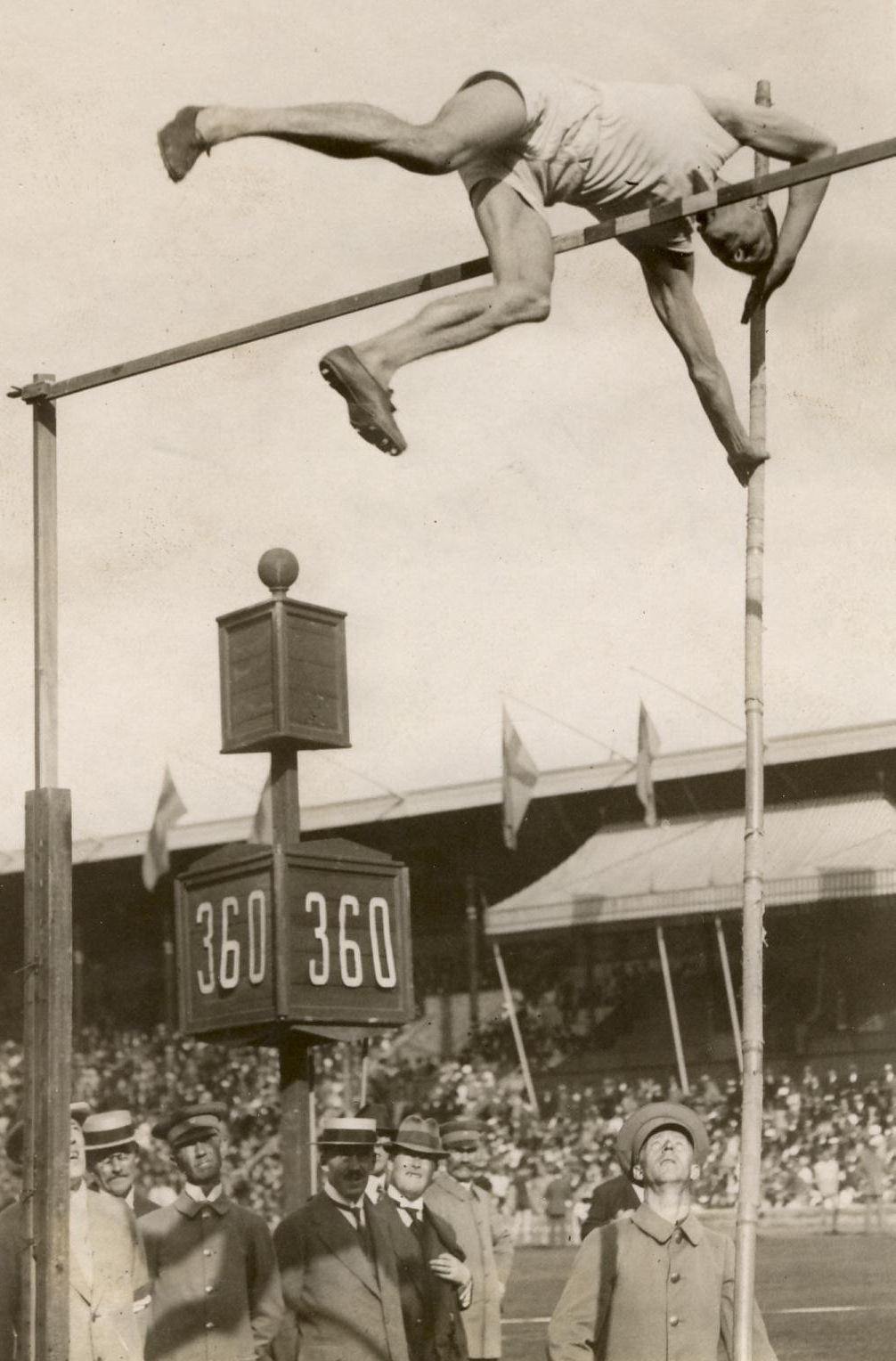

Personal information
- Born: 4 November 1895 Waukegan, Illinois, United States
- Died: 9 April 1976 (aged 80) Karlstad, Sweden

Sport
- Sport: Athletics
- Event: Pole vault / high jump
- Club: IF Göta

Achievements and titles
- Personal best: 3.80 m (1918)

Karl Georg Högström (4 November 1895 – 9 April 1976) was a Swedish pole vaulter, who competed at the 1920 Summer Olympics.

== Career ==
Högström won the Swedish national title in 1918 and 1919, and the British AAA Championships title at the 1919 AAA Championships. At the same Championships, he finished second behind Benjamin Howard Baker in the high jump event.

His personal best of 3.80 m in 1918 was the world-leading performance. Besides pole vaulting, in 1918 Högström won the national title in the high jump with a jump of 1.902 m, which was the world's second-best that year. After retiring from competitions, he became a bank executive.

At the 1920 Olympic Games, Högström competed in the pole vault and finished in eighth place.
