= Ernfrid Rydberg =

Swedish pole vaulter

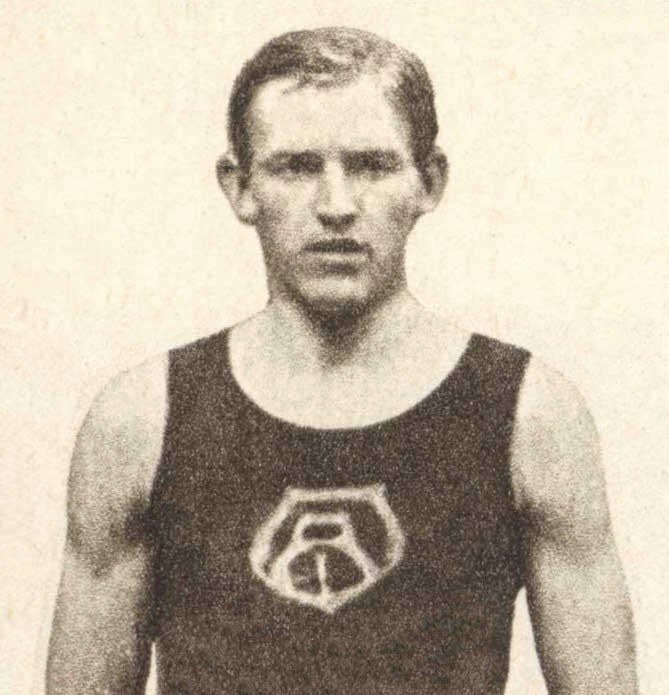

Personal information
- Born: 29 October 1896 Stockholm, Sweden
- Died: 3 December 1976 (aged 80) Uppsala, Sweden

Sport
- Sport: Athletics
- Event: Pole vault
- Club: Gefle IF

Achievements and titles
- Personal best: 3.90 m (1922)

Erik Gunnar Ernfrid Rydberg (29 October 1896 – 3 December 1976) was a Swedish pole vaulter who competed at the 1920 Summer Olympics.

== Career ==
At the 1920 Olympic Games, Rydberg competed in the pole vault event and finished fifth. Rydberg was the national champion in 1920, 1922 and 1924, and set a national record at 3.90 m in 1922.

Rydberg won the British AAA Championships title in the pole jump event at the 1921 AAA Championships.
