= Erik Mellbin =

Swedish sailor

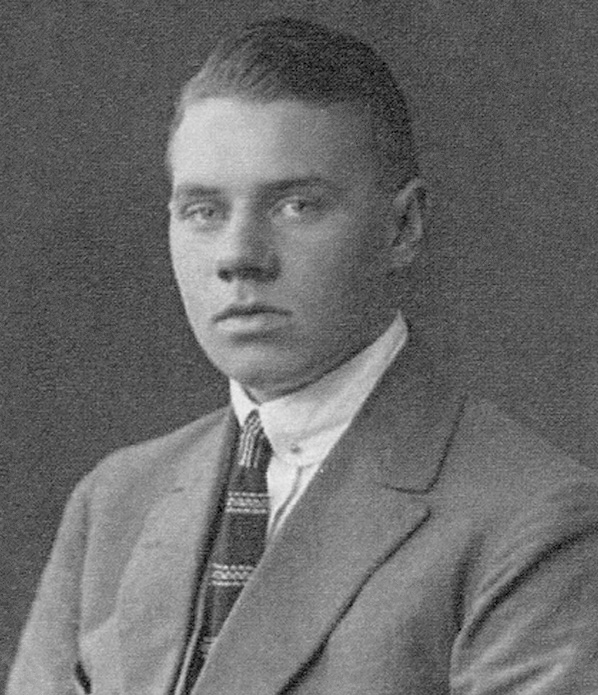

Personal information
- Born: 30 June 1901 Gothenburg, Sweden
- Died: 30 October 1955 (aged 54) Gothenburg, Sweden

Sailing career
- Sport: Sailing
- Club: Royal Gothenburg Yacht Club
Medal record
Representing Sweden
Olympic Games
Silver medal – second place	1920 Antwerp	40 m² class

Erik Hugo Mellbin (30 June 1901 – 30 October 1955) was a Swedish sailor. He was a crew member of the boat Elsie that won the silver medal in the 40 m^{2} class at the 1920 Summer Olympics.
