= Ragnar Svensson (sailor) =

Swedish sailor

Olympic medal record

Men's Sailing
Silver medal – second place	1920 Antwerp	40 m² class

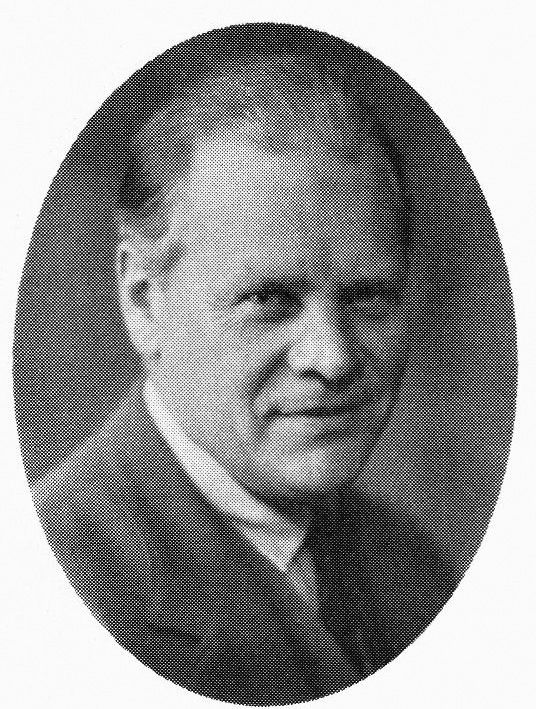
Ragnar Ossian Swensson

Ragnar Svensson (31 December 1882 – 5 June 1959) was a Swedish sailor who competed in the 1920 Summer Olympics. He was a crew member of the Swedish boat Elsie, which won the silver medal in the 40 m^{2} class.
