= Equestrian vaulting =

Gymnastics and dance on horseback

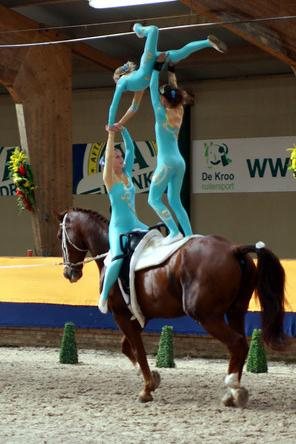
- Freestyle team vaulting
- Highest governing body: International Federation for Equestrian Sports (FEI)
- Nicknames: Vaulting

Characteristics
- Contact: No
- Team members: Individual and teams of varying numbers
- Mixed-sex: Yes
- Type: Indoor or outdoor
- Equipment: Horse, surcingle, longeing equipment
- Venue: Indoor or outdoor arena with sand or similar "dressage type" footing suitable for the horse & vaulter

Presence
- Olympic: 1920 Antwerp only
- World Games: 1993 (invitational)

Equestrian vaulting, or simply vaulting, is most often described as gymnastics and dance on horseback, which can be practiced both competitively or non-competitively and is different from circus or trick riding in that the horse is highly trained and controlled by a Loungeur. In competition, the Loungeur is also part of the athletic team. Despite the fact that helmets are not allowed in competition, vaulting is the safest of all equestrian disciplines. Vaulting is also foundational to all forms of riding with origins in military training, stretching back at least two thousand years. It is open to both men and women and is one of ten equestrian disciplines recognized by the International Federation for Equestrian Sports (Fédération Équestre Internationale or FEI). Therapeutic or interactive vaulting is also foundational to all therapeutic riding or activities for children and adults who may have balance, attention, gross motor skill or social deficits.

Vaulting's enthusiasts are concentrated in Europe and other parts of the Western world. It is especially well established in Germany and Switzerland. Vaulting was first introduced in the United States in the 1950s and 60s but was limited only to California and other areas of the west coast. As of 2010, it was beginning to gain popularity in the northeast United States.

== History ==
It is believed by some that the origins of vaulting could be traced to the ancient Roman games, where acrobats usually displayed their skills on cantering horses. Others, however, believe that vaulting originated in ancient Crete, where bull-leaping was prevalent. In either case, people have been performing acrobatic and dance-like movements on (or over) the backs of moving horses/animals for more than 2,000 years.

Renaissance and Middle Ages history include numerous references to vaulting or similar activities. The present name of the sport/art comes from the French la voltige, which it acquired during the Renaissance, when it was a form of riding drill and agility exercise for cavalry riders.

Modern vaulting developed in post-war Germany as an initiative to introduce children to equestrian sports.

In 1983, vaulting became one of the disciplines recognized by the FEI. European championships were first held in Ebreichsdorf, Austria in 1984, and the first FEI World Vaulting Championship was held in Bulle, Switzerland in 1986. Vaulting was included in the World Equestrian Games in Stockholm in 1990 and in all subsequent editions of the games. It was demonstrated as an art during the 1984 and 1996 Olympic Games events. It has been included in the Inter-Africa Cup since 2006.

The first World Cup Vaulting competition was held in Leipzig on 29–30 April 2011.

== Competition ==
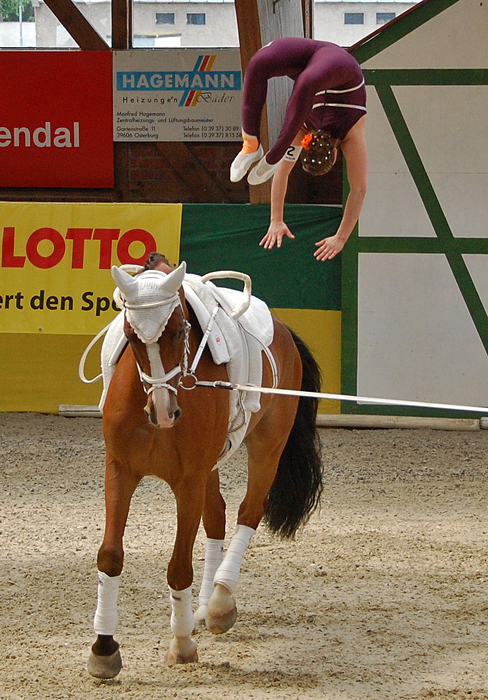
Individual freestyle

In competitive vaulting, vaulters compete as individuals, pairs (pas-de-deux) and Squad, (six vaulters, with up to three at a time on the horse). Beginning vaulters compete in walk while advanced vaulters compete at canter. The vaulting horse moves on a 30 meter circle and is connected to the lunger (or "longeur") via a lunge line, and who stands in the center. In competitive vaulting, the longeur, vaulter and horse are all judged on a scale from 1 to 10 with harmony, rhythm and "consideration of the horse" being the most important factors.

Vaulting competitions consist of compulsory exercises and choreographed freestyle exercises done to music. There are seven compulsory exercises: mount, basic seat, flag, mill, scissors, stand and flank. Each exercise is scored on a scale from 0 to 10. Horses also receive a score and are judged on the quality of their movement as well as their behavior.

Vaulters compete in team, pas-de-deux and individual categories. An individual freestyle (formerly known as Kür) is a 1-minute program, the pas-de-deux is 2 minutes, and squad, (formerly known as "team"), is 4 minutes, all choreographed to music. The components of a freestyle vaulting routine may include mounts and dismounts, handstands, kneeling and standing and aerial moves such jumps, leaps and tumbling skills. However, many of these skills are only seen in the highest levels. A typical routine for a child or beginner will more likely contain variations on simple kneels and planks. Teams also carry, lift, or even toss another vaulter in the air. Judging is based on technique, performance, form, difficulty, balance, security, and consideration of the horse; the horse is also scored, taking up 30% of the total score.

Vaulting horses wear a surcingle (or a roller), in lieu of a saddle, and a thick back pad. The surcingle has special handles which aid the vaulter in performing certain moves as well as leather loops called "cossack loops". The horse wears a bridle and side reins. The lunge line is attached to the inside bit ring.

Vaulting horses are worked in both directions, at walk, trot or canter, with most advanced competition primarily to the left and always at canter. Two-phase, and other classes of competition also work the horse to the right. While many European clubs do not compete to the right, they still work at home evenly both directions, believing this benefits the horse and the vaulter.

The premier vaulting competitions are the biannual World Junior & Senior Championships and the World Equestrian Games (WEG) held every four years. In many countries, vaulting associations organize and sponsor national, regional and local events every year. In 2011 there were at least 24 countries with such organisations.

== Competition movements ==
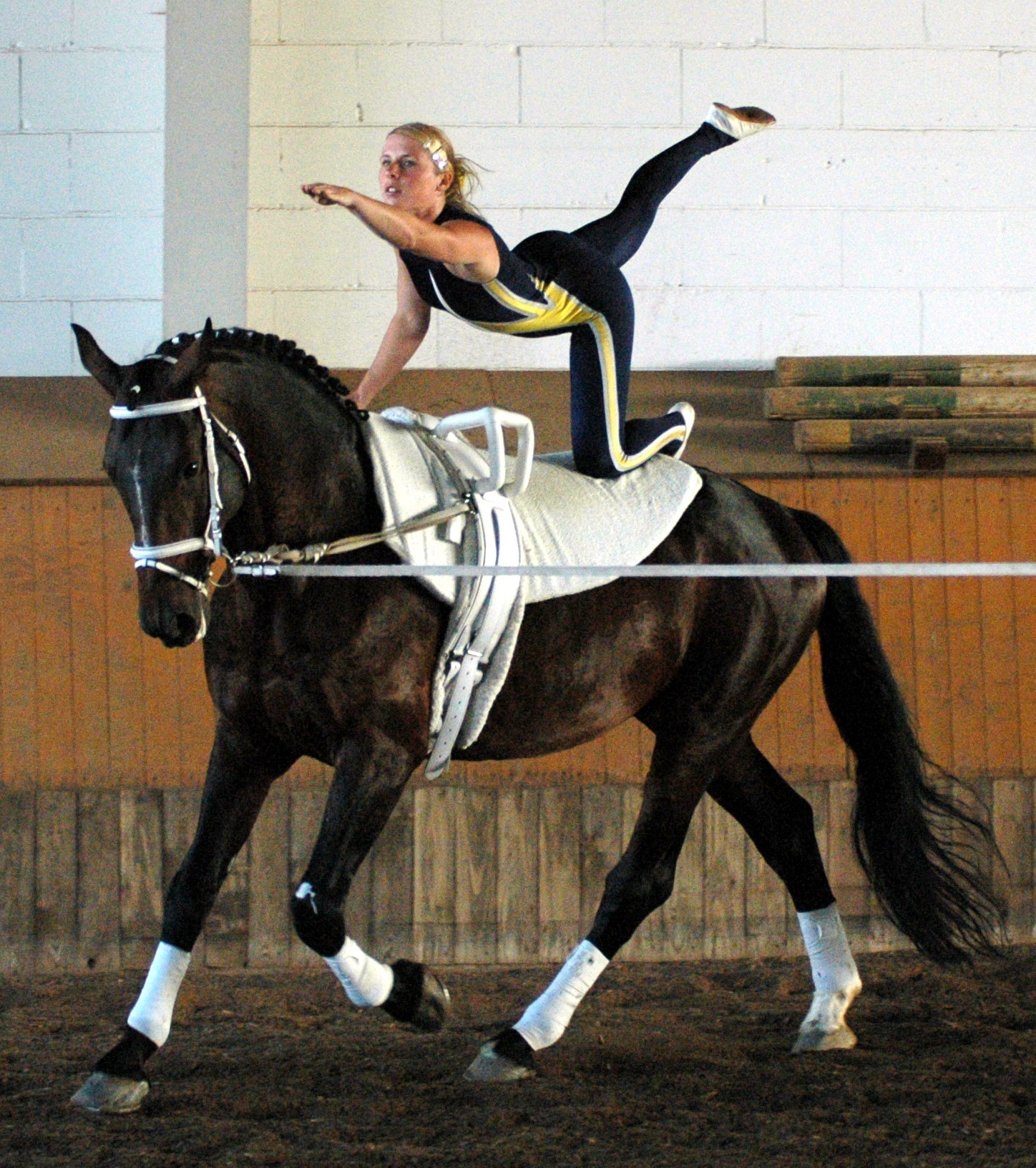
Compulsory flag

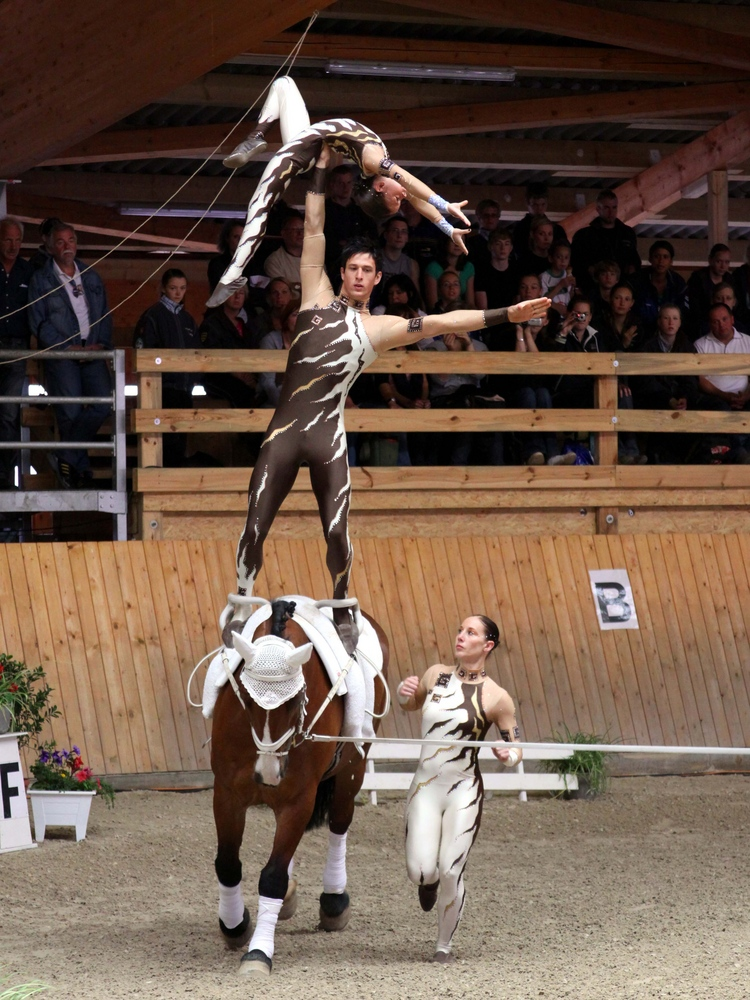
Team freestyle

Vaulters perform movements on the back of the horse. Novice and beginning vaulters may perform at the walk or the trot while higher level vaulters perform at the canter. Vaulters perform different compulsory exercises from the following list depending on the category and class they compete in:

Movement	Description
Vault On	The vault-on leads to the frontways seat on the horse. After jumping on both feet, the right leg swings up immediately, as high as possible, lifting the pelvis higher than the head, while the left leg remains stretched down. The shoulders and hips are parallel to the shoulder axis of the horse. When the pelvis is at the highest possible point, the vaulter lowers the stretched right leg and lands softly, erect and centred in the seat astride with the upper body vertical.
Basic Seat	An astride position (the vaulter sits on the horse as a rider would), with the arms held to the side and the hands raised to ear level. Hands should be held with closed fingers and palms facing downward, with the fingers arching slightly upward. Legs are wrapped around the horse's barrel, soles facing rearward, with toes down and feet arched. Vaulter holds this position for four full strides.
Flag	From the astride position, the vaulter hops to their knees and extends the right leg straight out behind, holding it slightly above their head so the leg is parallel to the horse's spine. The other leg should have pressure distributed through the shin and foot, most weight should be on the back of the ankle, to avoid digging the knee into the horse's back. The left arm is then stretched straight forward, at a height nearly that of the right leg. The hand should be held as it is in basic seat (palm down, fingers together). The right foot should be arched and the sole should face skyward. This movement should be held for four full strides after the arm and leg are raised.
Mill	From the astride position, the vaulter brings the right leg over the horse's neck. The grips must be ungrasped and retaken as the leg is brought over. The left leg is then brought in a full arc over the croup, again with a change of grips, before the right leg follows it, and the left leg moves over the neck to complete the full turn of the vaulter. The vaulter performs each leg movement in four strides each, completing the Mill movement in sixteen full strides. During the leg passes, the legs should be held perfectly straight, with the toes pointed. When the legs are on the same side of the horse, they should be pressed together. The vaulter must maintain good posture and may lean back at most 10% behind the vertical.
Scissors 1st part	From the astride position, the vaulter swings into a handstand. At the apex, the vaulter's body should be turned to the lunger and the inner leg should be crossed over the outer leg. The vaulter then comes down and lands so that they are facing backward on the horse, toward the tail.
Scissors 2nd part	From seat rearways on the horse the vaulter swings up with the outside leg over the inside leg, and lands facing forward once again. If the vaulter lands hard on the horse's back, they are severely penalized. Scissors is judged on the elevation of the movement.
Stand	The vaulter moves from the astride position onto the shins and immediately onto both feet, and releases the grips. The vaulter then straightens up with both knees bent, the buttocks tucked forward, and the hands held as they are in basic seat. The vaulter must hold the position for four full strides.
Flank 1st part	From the astride position, the legs are swung forward to create momentum, before swinging backward, and rolling onto the stomach with a straight body, with a full extension of the legs so that the vaulter nearly reaches a handstand. At the apex, the vaulter jackknifes her body and turns the body to the inside, before sliding down into a side seat. The vaulter is judged on form, landing, and elevation.
Swing off	From seat astride, the vaulter swings to handstand position with closed legs, arms extended to attain maximum elevation. At maximum arm extension, the vaulter pushes against the grips, and as a result of shoulder repulsion, attains additional elevation and maximum flight, landing to the inside of the horse, facing forward, on both feet.

== Dress code ==
The International Federation for Equestrian Sports (FEI) regulates dress codes for competitive vaulting. Every 2–3 years, new guidelines are released, which consistently declare that vaulters must wear form-fitting uniforms that do not conceal the line and form of the vaulter's body, as well as not hinder the movement of the vaulter or the safe interaction between the vaulters. For that reason, accessories such as belts, capes or hats are prohibited. Additionally, men's trousers must be secured at the ankle. It is expected that clothing be appropriate for the competition and does not give the effect of nudity. The most common form-fitting uniforms worn by vaulters are unitards.

== Non-competitive vaulting ==
In addition to competition, vaulting is a form of artistry, recreation and entertainment. Vaulters typically range in age from 7 to 70 years and older, practicing individual and team skills and routines. Athletes begin at the walk gait and progress to trot, and canter, based on harmony, strength and ability to mount and performing on the horse.

Vaulting is used on a therapeutic level in some instances. People with disabilities can often benefit from interacting with the horse and team members, and by doing simple movements with the help of "spotters" often wearing helmets.

Vaulting is often seen on a recreational level, through vaulting demonstrations, and occasionally in local parades.
