= United States at the 1920 Summer Olympics =

- Flag of the United States
- IOC code: USA
- NOC: American Olympic Committee

in Antwerp
- Competitors: 288 (274 men and 14 women) in 18 sports
- Flag bearer: Pat McDonald
- Medals Ranked 1st: Gold 41 Silver 27 Bronze 27 Total 95

Summer Olympics appearances (overview)
- 1896; 1900; 1904; 1908; 1912; 1920; 1924; 1928; 1932; 1936; 1948; 1952; 1956; 1960; 1964; 1968; 1972; 1976; 1980; 1984; 1988; 1992; 1996; 2000; 2004; 2008; 2012; 2016; 2020; 2024; 2028

Other related appearances
- 1906 Intercalated Games

The United States competed at the 1920 Summer Olympics in Antwerp, Belgium. 288 competitors, 274 men and 14 women, took part in 113 events in 18 sports.

== Medalists ==
Medal	Name	Sport	Event
Gold	Charles Paddock	Athletics	Men's 100 m
Gold	Allen Woodring	Athletics	Men's 200 m
Gold	Frank Loomis	Athletics	Men's 400 m hurdles
Gold	Charles Paddock; Jackson Scholz; Lorin Murchison; Morris Kirksey	Athletics	Men's 4 × 100 m relay
Gold	Horace Brown; Arlie Schardt; Ivan Dresser	Athletics	Men's 3000 m team race
Gold	Richmond Landon	Athletics	Men's high jump
Gold	Frank Foss	Athletics	Men's pole vault
Gold	Patrick Ryan	Athletics	Men's hammer throw
Gold	Pat McDonald	Athletics	Men's 56 lb weight throw
Gold	United States men's national rugby union team: Daniel Carroll; James Fitzpatrick; Charles Mehan; John Patrick; Dink Templeton; Charles Doe; Joseph Hunter; John Muldoon; Erwin Righter; Charles Lee Tilden, Jr.; George Fish; Morris Kirksey; John O'Neil; Rudolph Scholz; Heaton Wrenn	Rugby	Men's rugby union
Gold	Frankie Genaro	Boxing	Men's flyweight
Gold	Samuel Mosberg	Boxing	Men's lightweight
Gold	Eddie Eagan	Boxing	Men's light heavyweight
Gold	Louis Kuehn	Diving	Men's 3 m springboard
Gold	Clarence Pinkston	Diving	Men's 10 m platform
Gold	Aileen Riggin	Diving	Women's 3 m springboard
Gold	John B. Kelly Sr.	Rowing	Men's single sculls
Gold	Paul Costello; John B. Kelly Sr.	Rowing	Men's double sculls
Gold	Virgil Jacomini; Edwin Graves; William Jordan; Edward Moore; Alden Sanborn; Donald Johnston; Vince Gallagher; Clyde King; Sherm Clark	Rowing	Men's eight
Gold	Karl Frederick; Louis Harant; Michael Kelly; Alfred Lane; James H. Snook	Shooting	Men's 30 m team military pistol
Gold	Karl Frederick	Shooting	Men's 50 m free pistol
Gold	Raymond Bracken; Karl Frederick; Michael Kelly; Alfred Lane; James H. Snook	Shooting	Men's 50 m team free pistol
Gold	Lawrence Nuesslein	Shooting	Men's 50 m small bore rifle
Gold	Dennis Fenton; Willis A. Lee; Lawrence Nuesslein; Arthur Rothrock; Oliver Schriver	Shooting	Men's 50 m team small bore rifle
Gold	Morris Fisher	Shooting	Men's 300 m free rifle, 3 positions
Gold	Dennis Fenton; Morris Fisher; Willis A. Lee; Carl Osburn; Lloyd Spooner	Shooting	Men's team free rifle
Gold	Morris Fisher; Joseph Jackson; Willis A. Lee; Carl Osburn; Lloyd Spooner	Shooting	Men's 300 m team military rifle, prone
Gold	Carl Osborn	Shooting	Men's 300 m military rifle, standing
Gold	Dennis Fenton; Joseph Jackson; Willis A. Lee; Oliver Schriver; Lloyd Spooner	Shooting	Men's 600 m team military rifle, prone
Gold	Joseph Jackson; Willis A. Lee; Carl Osburn; Oliver Schriver; Lloyd Spooner	Shooting	Men's 300 + 600 m team military rifle, prone
Gold	Mark Arie	Shooting	Men's trap
Gold	Mark Arie; Horace Bonser; Jay Clark; Forest McNeir; Frank Troeh; Frank Wright	Shooting	Men's team clay pigeons
Gold	Duke Kahanamoku	Swimming	Men's 100 m freestyle
Gold	Norman Ross	Swimming	Men's 400 m freestyle
Gold	Norman Ross	Swimming	Men's 1500 m freestyle
Gold	Warren Kealoha	Swimming	Men's 100 m backstroke
Gold	Duke Kahanamoku; Pua Kealoha; Perry McGillivray; Norman Ross	Swimming	Men's 4 × 200 m freestyle relay
Gold	Ethelda Bleibtrey	Swimming	Women's 100 m freestyle
Gold	Ethelda Bleibtrey	Swimming	Women's 300 m freestyle
Gold	Ethelda Bleibtrey; Irene Guest; Frances Schroth; Margaret Woodbridge	Swimming	Women's 4 × 100 m freestyle relay
Gold	Charles Ackerly	Wrestling	Men's featherweight
Silver	Morris Kirksey	Athletics	Men's 100 m
Silver	Charles Paddock	Athletics	Men's 200 m
Silver	Earl Eby	Athletics	Men's 800 m
Silver	Harold Barron	Athletics	Men's 110 m hurdles
Silver	John Norton	Athletics	Men's 400 m hurdles
Silver	Patrick Flynn	Athletics	Men's 3000 m steeplechase
Silver	Joseph Pearman	Athletics	Men's 10 km walk
Silver	Carl Johnson	Athletics	Men's long jump
Silver	Harold Muller	Athletics	Men's high jump
Silver	Patrick Ryan	Athletics	Men's 56 lb weight throw
Silver	Everett Bradley	Athletics	Men's pentathlon
Silver	Brutus Hamilton	Athletics	Men's decathlon
Silver	Clarence Pinkston	Diving	Men's 3 m springboard
Silver	Helen Wainwright	Diving	Women's 3 m springboard
Silver	Ken Myers; Carl Klose; Franz Federschmidt; Erich Federschmidt; Sherm Clark	Rowing	Men's coxed four
Silver	Raymond Bracken	Shooting	Men's 30 m military pistol
Silver	Arthur Rothrock	Shooting	Men's 50 m small bore rifle
Silver	Thomas Brown; Willis A. Lee; Lawrence Nuesslein; Carl Osburn; Lloyd Spooner	Shooting	Men's 300 m team military rifle, standing
Silver	Frank Troeh	Shooting	Men's trap
Silver	Pua Kealoha	Swimming	Men's 100 m freestyle
Silver	Ludy Langer	Swimming	Men's 400 m freestyle
Silver	Ray Kegeris	Swimming	Men's 100 m backstroke
Silver	Irene Guest	Swimming	Women's 100 m freestyle
Silver	Margaret Woodbridge	Swimming	Women's 300 m freestyle
Silver	Sam Gerson	Wrestling	Men's featherweight
Silver	Nat Pendleton	Wrestling	Men's heavyweight
Silver	United States men's national ice hockey team Raymond Bonney; Anthony Conroy; Herbert Drury; Edward Fitzgerald; George Geran; Frank Goheen; Joseph McCormick; Lawrence McCormick; Frank Synott; Leon Tuck; Cyril Weidenborner	Ice Hockey	Men's competition
Bronze	Lawrence Shields	Athletics	Men's 1500 m
Bronze	Feg Murray	Athletics	Men's 110 m hurdles
Bronze	August Desch	Athletics	Men's 400 m hurdles
Bronze	Richard Remer	Athletics	Men's 3 km walk
Bronze	Edwin Myers	Athletics	Men's pole vault
Bronze	Harry Liversedge	Athletics	Men's shot put
Bronze	Gus Pope	Athletics	Men's discus throw
Bronze	Basil Bennett	Athletics	Men's hammer throw
Bronze	Frederick Colberg	Boxing	Men's welterweight
Bronze	Louis Balbach	Diving	Men's 3 m springboard
Bronze	Harry Prieste	Diving	Men's 10 m platform
Bronze	Thelma Payne	Diving	Women's 3 m springboard
Bronze	Alfred Lane	Shooting	Men's 50 m free pistol
Bronze	Dennis Fenton	Shooting	Men's 50 m small bore rifle
Bronze	Lawrence Nuesslein	Shooting	Men's 300 m military rifle, standing
Bronze	Lloyd Spooner	Shooting	Men's 600 m military rifle, prone
Bronze	Thomas Brown; Willis A. Lee; Lawrence Nuesslein; Carl Osburn; Lloyd Spooner	Shooting	Men's 100 m team running deer, single shots
Bronze	Frank Wright	Shooting	Men's trap
Bronze	Bill Harris	Swimming	Men's 100 m freestyle
Bronze	Frances Schroth	Swimming	Women's 100 m freestyle
Bronze	Frances Schroth	Swimming	Women's 300 m freestyle
Bronze	Charley Johnson	Wrestling	Men's middleweight
Bronze	Walter Maurer	Wrestling	Men's light heavyweight
Bronze	Fred Meyer	Wrestling	Men's heavyweight
Bronze	Francis Honeycutt; Arthur Lyon; Robert Sears; Henry Breckinridge; Harold Rayner	Fencing	Men's team foil
Bronze	United States; Arthur Harris; Terry Allen; John Montgomery; Nelson Margetts	Polo	Men's competition
Bronze	Theresa Weld	Figure Skating	Women's singles

== Background: voyage to Antwerp ==
Beginning July 26, 1920, a majority of the U.S. Olympic contingent destined for the 1920 Summer Olympics in Antwerp, Belgium, endured a troubled transatlantic journey aboard Princess Matoika. The voyage and the events on board, later called the "Mutiny of the Matoika", were still being discussed in the popular press years later. The Matoika was a last-minute substitute for another ship and, according to the athletes, did not have adequate accommodations or training facilities on board. The conditions on the Princess Matoika were terrible, as the hold reeked of formaldehyde from the dead bodies of the recently deceased American World War I soldiers, and there was no place to train. Furthermore, the athletes were dissatisfied with the quality of food and huge numbers of rats present on the ship. Near the end of the voyage, the athletes published a list of grievances and demands and distributed copies of the document to the United States Secretary of War, the American Olympic Committee members, and the press. Among these were the demands for better accommodations in Antwerp, cabin passage home, and railroad fare from New York to their home cities. The incident received wide coverage in American newspapers at the time.

== Aquatics ==
=== Diving ===
Fourteen divers, seven men and seven women, represented the United States in 1920. It was the nation's fourth appearance in the sport; the United States was the only nation to have competed at each Olympic diving contest to that point. The Americans won their first gold medals in the sport since 1904, winning championships in three of the five diving events in 1920. The team swept both the men's and women's springboard events (though only Americans competed in the women's springboard), and added a gold and a bronze in the men's platform. Pinkston was the only diver from any nation in 1920 to win multiple medals.

Men

Ranks given are within the semifinal group.

Diver	Event	Semifinals			Final		
Diver	Event	Points	Score	Rank	Points	Score	Rank
Louis Balbach	3 m springboard	8	630.80	2 Q	15	649.50	3rd place, bronze medalist(s)
Louis Balbach	10 m platform	17	409.15	3 Q	28	424.00	6
Richard Beauchamp	Plain high dive	23	135.0	6	did not advance		
Louis Kuehn	3 m springboard	7	628.15	1 Q	10	675.40	1st place, gold medalist(s)
Frank Mullen	Plain high dive	27	144.0	6	did not advance		
Clarence Pinkston	3 m springboard	8	622.70	2 Q	11	655.30	2nd place, silver medalist(s)
Clarence Pinkston	10 m platform	10	443.00	2 Q	7	503.30	1st place, gold medalist(s)
Harry Prieste	10 m platform	17	441.80	3 Q	16	468.65	3rd place, bronze medalist(s)
Harry Prieste	Plain high dive	18	149.5	4	did not advance		
Clyde Swendsen	10 m platform	26	414.80	6	did not advance		
Clyde Swendsen	Plain high dive	25	148.0	5	did not advance		

Women

Ranks given are within the semifinal group.

Diver	Event	Semifinals			Final		
Diver	Event	Points	Score	Rank	Points	Score	Rank
Aileen Allen	3 m springboard	N/A			20	489.9	4
Betty Grimes	10 m platform	13	156.0	2 Q	30	133.5	6
Alice Lord	10 m platform	35	118.5	7	did not advance		
Helen Meany	10 m platform	23	145.0	5	did not advance		
Thelma Payne	3 m springboard	N/A			12	534.1	3rd place, bronze medalist(s)
Aileen Riggin	3 m springboard	N/A			9	539.9	1st place, gold medalist(s)
Aileen Riggin	10 m platform	15	155.5	2 Q	20	157.0	5
Helen Wainwright	3 m springboard	N/A			9	534.8	2nd place, silver medalist(s)

=== Swimming ===
Twenty-two swimmers, sixteen men and six women, represented the United States in 1920. It was the nation's sixth appearance in the sport; the United States was the only nation to have competed in every Olympic swimming edition to that point. The Americans took eight of the ten gold medals, along with five silvers and three bronzes. This gave the team more than half of the available medals—16 out of 30; more than three times the next-best country. Eleven different Americans finished with at least one medal. Furthermore, the United States set five new world records and tied another.

On the men's side, Kahanamoku set a new Olympic record in the quarterfinals of the 100 free, then tied the world record twice in the semis and the final as the Americans swept the medals in that event. Ross took a pair of gold medals in the other two freestyle events. Kegeris briefly took the Olympic record in the 100 metre backstroke semifinals before Warren Kealoha broke the world record in the second semifinal; Kealoha took gold and Kegeris silver in the final. The relay team also set a world record in winning the gold medal.

On the women's side, Schroth, like Kegeris, briefly held an Olympic record in the 100 free before Bleibtrey broke the world record in a later semifinal. Bleibtrey bettered her own new record, leading the American women to a sweep of the medals in that event. Bleibtrey took her second world record and second gold medal in the 300 free, as the Americans swept that event as well. Her third gold medal and third world record came as part of the 4x100 free relay team along with Schroth, Guest, and Woodbridge.

Ranks given are within the heat.

Men

Swimmer	Event	Quarterfinals		Semifinals		Final	
Swimmer	Event	Result	Rank	Result	Rank	Result	Rank
Eugene Bolden	1500 m free	23:41.2	2 Q	23:26.4	3 q	24:04.3	5
Bill Harris	100 m free	1:04.4	1 Q	1:04.2	2 Q	1:03.0	3rd place, bronze medalist(s)
Bill Harris	400 m free	5:57.8	1 Q	5:36.0	3	did not advance	
Jack Howell	200 m breast	3:09.8	1 Q	3:10.8	1 Q	Unknown	4
Jack Howell	400 m breast	6:57.0	1 Q	6:51.4	3 q	6:51.0	4
Duke Kahanamoku	100 m free	1:01.8 OR	1 Q	1:01.4 =WR	1 Q	1:01.4 =WR	1st place, gold medalist(s)
Fred Kahele	400 m free	5:37.4	2 Q	5:35.8	2 Q	Unknown	4
Fred Kahele	1500 m free	23:41.6	2 Q	23:23.0	2 Q	23:59.1	4
Pua Kealoha	100 m free	1:02.0	1 Q	1:02.4	1 Q	1:02.6	2nd place, silver medalist(s)
Warren Kealoha	100 m back	N/A		1:14.8 WR	1 Q	1:15.2	1st place, gold medalist(s)
Ray Kegeris	100 m back	N/A		1:17.8 OR	1 Q	1:16.8	2nd place, silver medalist(s)
Harold Kruger	100 m back	N/A		1:19.0	2 Q	Unknown	5
Ludy Langer	400 m free	5:41.1	1 Q	5:29.2	2 Q	5:29.0	2nd place, silver medalist(s)
Ludy Langer	1500 m free	24:28.8	1 Q	Unknown	4	did not advance	
Mike McDermott	200 m breast	3:16.4	2 Q	Unknown	4	did not advance	
Mike McDermott	400 m breast	7:12.8	3 q	7:13.2	3	did not advance	
Perry McGillivray	100 m back	N/A		1:20.4	3 q	1:19.4	4
Charles Quinby	400 m breast	Unknown	4	did not advance			
Norman Ross	100 m free	1:04.2	1 Q	1:04.8	1 Q	Disqualified	
Norman Ross	400 m free	6:16.2	1 Q	5:33.8	1 Q	5:26.8	1st place, gold medalist(s)
Norman Ross	1500 m free	24:08.2	1 Q	23:12.0	1 Q	22:23.2	1st place, gold medalist(s)
Stephen Ruddy	200 m breast	Unknown	4	did not advance			
Stephen Ruddy	400 m breast	7:13.0	3	did not advance			
Herbert Taylor	200 m breast	Unknown	4	did not advance			
Duke Kahanamoku; Pua Kealoha; Perry McGillivray; Norman Ross	4 × 200 m free relay	N/A		10:20.4	1 Q	10:04.4 WR	1st place, gold medalist(s)

Women

Swimmer	Event	Semifinals		Final	
Swimmer	Event	Result	Rank	Result	Rank
Ethelda Bleibtrey	100 m free	1:14.4 WR	1 Q	1:13.6 WR	1st place, gold medalist(s)
Ethelda Bleibtrey	300 m free	4:41.4 WR	1 Q	4:34.0 WR	1st place, gold medalist(s)
Charlotte Boyle	100 m free	1:20.4	2 Q	did not finish	
Irene Guest	100 m free	1:18.8	1 Q	1:17.0	2nd place, silver medalist(s)
Frances Schroth	100 m free	1:18.0 OR	1 Q	1:17.2	3rd place, bronze medalist(s)
Frances Schroth	300 m free	5:03.2	2 Q	4:52.0	3rd place, bronze medalist(s)
Eleanor Uhl	300 m free	5:02.0	1 Q	Unknown	5
Margaret Woodbridge	300 m free	4:56.6	1 Q	4:42.8	2nd place, silver medalist(s)
Ethelda Bleibtrey; Irene Guest; Frances Schroth; Margaret Woodbridge	4 × 100 m free relay	N/A		5:11.6 WR	1st place, gold medalist(s)

=== Water polo ===
The United States competed in the Olympic water polo tournament for the second time in 1920. The Bergvall System was in use at the time. The Americans shut out Greece in the quarterfinals, advancing to the semifinals. They were defeated there by a dominant Great Britain side, which went on to win the gold medal. This gave the United States an opportunity to play for the silver under the Bergvall System. In the silver medal semifinals, they shut out Spain, but were again stymied in a loss to Belgium in the silver medal match. With one last chance at a medal, the Americans again defeated Greece in the bronze medal semifinals. In the bronze medal match, however, the team was shut out by Sweden.

Quarterfinals

United States	7–0	Greece	Antwerp

Semifinals

Great Britain	7–2	United States	Antwerp

Silver medal semifinals

United States	5–0	Spain	Antwerp

Silver medal match

United States	2–7	Belgium	Antwerp

Bronze medal semifinals

United States	7–0	Greece	Antwerp

Bronze medal match

Sweden	5–0	United States	Antwerp

Final rank
4th

== Athletics ==
90 athletes represented the United States in 1920. It was the sixth appearance of the nation in athletics, a sport in which the United States had competed at every Games. The American team, used to dominance of the sport, was seriously challenged for the first time. The nine gold medals won by the team tied the mark for fewest the nation had ever won, matching the 1896 total (when only 12 events, rather than 29, were contested). Finland matched the United States gold medal for gold medal, the first time any other nation had done so and the last time until the 1972 Games. The depth of the American team allowed the team to collect twelve silver and eight bronze medals as well (the United States's 29 total medals nearly doubled the 16 of Finland), allowing the team to remain on top of the athletics medals leader board yet again.

Ranks given are within the heat.

Athlete	Event	Heats		Quarterfinals		Semifinals		Final	
Athlete	Event	Result	Rank	Result	Rank	Result	Rank	Result	Rank
Dan Ahearn	Triple jump	13.75	6 Q	—N/a				14.08	6
Milton Angier	Javelin throw	57.58	9 Q	—N/a				59.275	7
Harold Barron	110 m hurdles	—N/a		15.2	1 Q	15.0 =WR	1 Q	15.1	2nd place, silver medalist(s)
William Bartlett	Discus throw	40.875	4	—N/a				40.875	5
Basil Bennett	Hammer throw	48.25	2 Q	—N/a				48.25	3rd place, bronze medalist(s)
George Bihlman	Shot put	13.575	7	—N/a				did not advance	
Max Bohland	Cross country	—N/a							16
Everett Bradley	Pentathlon	—N/a						24	2nd place, silver medalist(s)
Horace Brown	5000 m	—N/a				15:31.8	3 Q	did not finish	
Sol Butler	Long jump	6.60	7	—N/a				did not advance	
Thomas Campbell	800 m	—N/a		1:59.1	2 Q	1:57.6	2 Q	did not finish	
Howard Cann	Shot put	13.52	8	—N/a				did not advance	
James Connolly	1500 m	—N/a				4:10.0	3 Q	did not finish	
George Cornetta	10000 m	—N/a					9	did not advance	
Robert Crawford	Cross country	—N/a							40
Edward Curtis	1500 m	—N/a				did not finish		did not advance	
Charles Daggs	400 m hurdles	—N/a		56.7	2 Q	55.8	3 Q	55.7	6
August Desch	400 m hurdles	—N/a		57.6	1 Q	55.4	1 Q	54.7	3rd place, bronze medalist(s)
Michael Devaney	3000 m steeplechase	—N/a				10:23.0 OR	1 Q	10:34.3	5
Ivan Dresser	5000 m	—N/a				15:41.6	3 Q	did not finish	
Robert Dunne	Pentathlon	—N/a						did not finish	
Earl Eby	800 m	—N/a		1:56.8	3 Q	1:57.0	2 Q	1:53.6	2nd place, silver medalist(s)
Everett Ellis	Decathlon	—N/a						did not finish	
Robert Emery	400 m	52.6	1 Q	50.7	3 Q	50.2	4	did not advance	
Frederick Faller	10000 m	—N/a				33:02.4	4 Q	32:38.0	8
Frederick Faller	Cross country	—N/a							15
Patrick Flynn	3000 m steeplechase	—N/a				10:36.0	1 Q	10:21.1	2nd place, silver medalist(s)
Patrick Flynn	Cross country	—N/a						28:12.0	9
Frank Foss	Pole vault	3.60	1 Q	—N/a				4.09 WR	1st place, gold medalist(s)
Clifford Furnas	5000 m	—N/a				15:23.0	4 Q	did not finish	
Kaufman Geist	Triple jump	13.52	12	—N/a				did not advance	
Harry Goelitz	Decathlon	—N/a						did not finish	
Brutus Hamilton	Pentathlon	—N/a						27	6
Brutus Hamilton	Decathlon	—N/a						6771.085	2nd place, silver medalist(s)
Albert Hulsebosch	3000 m steeplechase	—N/a				10:26.8	3 Q	10:37.7	6
Charles Hunter	5000 m	—N/a					5	did not advance	
Clarence Jaquith	Triple jump	13.04	15	—N/a				did not advance	
Eldon Jenne	Pole vault	3.60	1 Q	—N/a				3.60	7
Carl Johnson	Long jump	6.82	3 Q	—N/a				7.095	2nd place, silver medalist(s)
Richard Johnson	10000 m	—N/a					8	did not advance	
Morris Kirksey	100 m	11.0	1 Q	10.8	1 Q	11.0	3 Q	10.9	2nd place, silver medalist(s)
Morris Kirksey	200 m	23.4	1 Q	22.6	1 Q	22.5	4	did not advance	
Edward Knourek	Pole vault	3.60	1 Q	—N/a				3.60	4
Sherman Landers	Triple jump	14.00	4 Q	—N/a				14.17	5
Richmond Landon	High jump	1.80	1 Q	—N/a				1.936	1st place, gold medalist(s)
Robert LeGendre	Pentathlon	—N/a						26	4
James Lincoln	Javelin throw	57.86	8 Q	—N/a				57.86	9
Carl Linder	Marathon	—N/a						2:44:21.2	11
Harry Liversedge	Shot put	13.755	4 Q	—N/a				14.15	3rd place, bronze medalist(s)
Frank Loomis	400 m hurdles	—N/a		55.8	1 Q	55.4	1 Q	54.0 WR	1st place, gold medalist(s)
Jack Mahan	Javelin throw	53.52	12	—N/a				did not advance	
Thomas Maroney	3 km walk	—N/a				13:52.1	3 Q	13:25.0	5
Thomas Maroney	10 km walk	—N/a				51:54.6	3 Q	50:24.4	6
Pat McDonald	Shot put	14.08	2 Q	—N/a				14.08	4
Pat McDonald	56 lb weight throw	11.00	1 Q	—N/a				11.265 OR	1st place, gold medalist(s)
James McEachern	Hammer throw	44.70	8	—N/a				did not advance	
James McEachern	56 lb weight throw	8.84	10	—N/a				did not advance	
Matt McGrath	Hammer throw	46.67	5 Q	—N/a				46.67	5
Charles Mellor	Marathon	—N/a						2:45:30.0	12
John Merchant	Long jump	6.50	11	—N/a				did not advance	
Ted Meredith	400 m	51.6	1 Q	50.8	3 Q	50.6	4	did not advance	
Harold Muller	High jump	1.80	1 Q	—N/a				1.90	2nd place, silver medalist(s)
Loren Murchison	100 m	10.8	1 Q	10.9	2 Q	11.0	3 Q	11.2	6
Loren Murchison	200 m	23.2	1 Q	22.8	1 Q	22.4	1 Q	22.2	4
John Murphy	High jump	1.80	1 Q	—N/a				1.85	5
Feg Murray	110 m hurdles	—N/a		15.8	1 Q	15.2	2 Q	15.1	3rd place, bronze medalist(s)
Edwin Myers	Pole vault	3.60	1 Q	—N/a				3.60	3rd place, bronze medalist(s)
John Norton	400 m hurdles	—N/a		57.6	1 Q	56.2	3 Q	54.6	2nd place, silver medalist(s)
Joseph Organ	Marathon	—N/a						2:41:30.0	7
Charlie Paddock	100 m	10.8	1 Q	10.8	1 Q	10.8	1 Q	10.6 =OR	1st place, gold medalist(s)
Charlie Paddock	200 m	23.2	1 Q	22.9	2 Q	22.5	2 Q	22.0	2nd place, silver medalist(s)
Amisoli Patisoni	10000 m	—N/a				did not finish		did not advance	
Amisoli Patisoni	Cross country	—N/a						did not finish	
Joseph Pearman	3 km walk	—N/a				Disqualified		did not advance	
Joseph Pearman	10 km walk	—N/a				47:30.0	2 Q	49:40.2	2nd place, silver medalist(s)
William Plant	10 km walk	—N/a				52:18.3	4 Q	did not start	
Gus Pope	Discus throw	42.13	3 Q	—N/a				42.13	3rd place, bronze medalist(s)
Joie Ray	1500 m	—N/a				4:13.4	1 Q	4:13.0	8
Richard Remer	3 km walk	—N/a				13:54.1	3 Q	13:22.2	3rd place, bronze medalist(s)
Edward Roberts	56 lb weight throw	9.36	7	—N/a				did not advance	
Winfred Rolker	3 km walk	—N/a				13:59.8	4 Q	13:30.4	8
Winfred Rolker	10 km walk	—N/a					7	did not advance	
Frank Roth	Marathon	—N/a						did not finish	
Patrick Ryan	Hammer throw	52.875	1 Q	—N/a				52.875	1st place, gold medalist(s)
Patrick Ryan	56 lb weight throw	10.925	2 Q	—N/a				10.965	2nd place, silver medalist(s)
George Schiller	400 m	50.4	1 Q	51.1	2 Q		5	did not advance	
Jackson Scholz	100 m	10.8	1 Q	10.8	1 Q	10.9	2 Q	10.9	4
Donald Scott	800 m	—N/a		1:56.9	2 Q	1:57.2	1 Q	1:54.6	5
Frank Shea	400 m	50.8	1 Q	51.0	1 Q	50.0	1 Q	50.4	4
Lawrence Shields	1500 m	—N/a				4:07.4	3 Q	4:04.3	3rd place, bronze medalist(s)
Walker Smith	110 m hurdles	—N/a		15.8	1 Q	15.2	2 Q	15.3	5
Albert Sprott	800 m	—N/a		2:01.5	2 Q	1:58.6	3 Q	1:55.4	6
Dink Templeton	Long jump	6.67	5 Q	—N/a				6.95	4
Arthur Tuck	Javelin throw	53.78	11	—N/a				did not advance	
Eugene Vidal	Decathlon	—N/a						6358.570	7
Lewis Watson	Cross country	—N/a						Unknown	34
Ray Watson	3000 m steeplechase	—N/a				10:49.0	3 Q	10:50.3	8
Walter Whalen	High jump	1.80	1 Q	—N/a				1.85	4
Kenneth Wilson	Discus throw	37.58	10	—N/a				did not advance	
Allen Woodring	200 m	22.8	1 Q	22.1	2 Q	22.4	1 Q	22.0	1st place, gold medalist(s)
William Yount	110 m hurdles	—N/a		15.6	1 Q		5	did not advance	
Max Bohland; Frederick Faller; Patrick Flynn	Team cross country	—N/a						36	4
George Bretnall; Ted Meredith; George Schiller; Frank Shea	4 × 400 m relay	—N/a				3:40.7	2 Q	3:23.6	4
Morris Kirksey; Loren Murchison; Charlie Paddock; Jackson Scholz	4 × 100 m relay	—N/a				43.0	1 Q	42.2 WR	1st place, gold medalist(s)
Horace Brown; Michael Devaney; Ivan Dresser; Arlie Schardt; Lawrence Shields	3000 m team	—N/a				14	2 Q	10	1st place, gold medalist(s)

== Boxing ==
16 boxers represented the United States at the 1920 Games. It was the nation's second appearance in boxing. The American team was one of two to send the maximum number of boxers, two in each weight class, along with Great Britain. The Americans' three gold medals was the best of any nation, but their four total medals was only the third most.

Boxer	Weight class	Round of 32	Round of 16	Quarterfinals	Semifinals	Final / Bronze match	
Boxer	Weight class	Opposition Score	Opposition Score	Opposition Score	Opposition Score	Opposition Score	Rank
Frank Cassidy	Lightweight	N/A	Janssens (NED); W	Johansen (DEN); L	did not advance		5
William Clark	Welterweight	Bye	Werll (BEL); W	Stokstad (NOR); W	Ireland (GBR); L	Colberg (USA); L	4
Frederick Colberg	Welterweight	Bye	Schannong (DEN); W	Gillet (FRA); W	Schneider (CAN); L	Clark (USA); W	3rd place, bronze medalist(s)
Joseph Cranston	Middleweight	Bye	Mallin (GBR); L	did not advance			9
Eddie Eagan	Light heavyweight	N/A	Bye	Holdstock (RSA); W	Franks (GBR); W	Sørsdal (NOR); W	1st place, gold medalist(s)
George Etzell	Featherweight	Bye	Fritsch (FRA); L	did not advance			9
Frankie Genaro	Flyweight	N/A	Nilsen (NOR); W	Rampignon (FRA); W	Albert (FRA); W	Pedersen (DEN); W	1st place, gold medalist(s)
Edward Hartman	Bantamweight	N/A	Bowling (GBR); W	Walker (RSA); L	did not advance		5
Samuel Lagonia	Middleweight	Bye	Jacobsen (NOR); W	Mallin (GBR); L	did not advance		5
Samuel Mosberg	Lightweight	N/A	Solvinto (FRA); W	Grace (GBR); W	Beland (RSA); W	Johansen (DEN); W	1st place, gold medalist(s)
Edwin Schell	Light heavyweight	N/A	MacGregor (RSA); W	Sørsdal (NOR); L	did not advance		5
William Spengler	Heavyweight	N/A	Bye	Creusen (BEL); W	Petersen (DEN); L	Eluère (FRA); L	4
Samuel Stewart	Heavyweight	N/A	Bye	Rawson (GBR); L	did not advance		5
Sam Vogel	Bantamweight	N/A	Cochon (FRA); W	Hébrans (BEL); L	did not advance		5
Jack Zivic	Featherweight	Bye	Bye	Clausen (DEN); L	did not advance		5
Peter Zivic	Flyweight	N/A	van Dijk (NED); W	Pedersen (DEN); L	did not advance		5

Opponent nation	Wins	Losses	Percent
Belgium	2	1	.667
Canada	0	1	.000
Denmark	3	4	.429
France	5	2	.714
Great Britain	3	4	.429
Netherlands	2	0	1.000
Norway	4	1	.800
South Africa	3	1	.750
Total international	22	14	.611
United States	1	1	.500
Total	23	15	.605

Round	Wins	Losses	Percent
Round of 32	0	0	–
Round of 16	10	2	.833
Quarterfinals	6	8	.429
Semifinals	3	3	.500
Final	3	0	1.000
Bronze match	1	2	.333
Total	23	15	.605

== Cycling ==
Nine cyclists represented the United States in 1920. It was the nation's fifth appearance in the sport. Taylor's semifinal qualification in the sprint was the best result on the cycling track for the Americans, with Kockler's 13th-place finish in the individual time trial the best American result in road cycling, leading the American road cyclists to a 7th place team total.

=== Road cycling ===
Cyclist	Event	Final	
Cyclist	Event	Result	Rank
James Freeman	Time trial	5:29:26.2	37
Ernest Kockler	Time trial	4:55:12.2	13
August Nogara	Time trial	5:20:08.0	30
John Otto	Time trial	5:47:50.2	42
James Freeman; Ernest Kockler; August Nogara; John Otto	Team time trial	21:32:36.6	7

=== Track cycling ===
Ranks given are within the heat.

Cyclist	Event	Heats		Quarterfinals		Repechage semis		Repechage final		Semifinals		Final	
Cyclist	Event	Result	Rank	Result	Rank	Result	Rank	Result	Rank	Result	Rank	Result	Rank
William Beck	Sprint	Unknown	3	did not advance									
William Beck	50 km	N/A										did not finish	
Christopher Dotterweich	Sprint	Unknown	2 Q	Unknown	2 R	Unknown	2	did not advance					
Frank Small	50 km	N/A										did not finish	
Fred Taylor	Sprint	13.2	1 Q	13.0	1 Q	Advanced directly				15.2	2	did not advance	
Fred Taylor	50 km	N/A										did not finish	
Anthony Young	Sprint	13.2	1 Q	Unknown	2 R	Disqualified		did not advance					
Anthony Young	50 km	N/A										did not finish	
William Beck; Christopher Dotterweich; Fred Taylor; Anthony Young	Team pursuit	N/A		Unknown	2	N/A				did not advance			

== Equestrian ==
Eight equestrians represented the United States in 1920. It was the nation's third appearance in the sport, having been one of three countries (along with Belgium and France) to have appeared at every Olympic equestrian competition to that point. The Americans earned no medals in 1920, unable to add to the bronze won in 1912. The team's best individual result was Chamberlin's sixth place in the eventing; the eventing team took fourth place. In a somewhat unusual result, all three of the American dressage competitors earned exactly the same score.

Equestrian	Horse	Event	Final	
Equestrian	Horse	Event	Result	Rank
Henry Allen	Don	Jumping	7.00	7
John Burke Barry	Chiswell	Dressage	19.3125	14
John Burke Barry	Raven	Eventing	1350.00	16
Harry Chamberlin	Harebell	Dressage	19.3125	14
Harry Chamberlin	Nigra	Eventing	1568.75	6
Sloan Doak	Singlen	Dressage	19.3125	14
Sloan Doak	Deceive	Eventing	did not finish	
John Downer	Dick	Jumping	8.50	12
William West	Black Boy	Eventing	1558.75	7
William West	Prince	Jumping	12.00	18
John Burke Barry; Harry Chamberlin; Sloan Doak; William West	Raven; Nigra; Deceive; Black Boy	Team eventing	4477.50	4
Harry Chamberlin; Sloan Doak; Vincent Erwin; Karl Greenwald	Nigra; Rabbit Red; Joffre; Moses	Team jumping	42.00	5

== Fencing ==
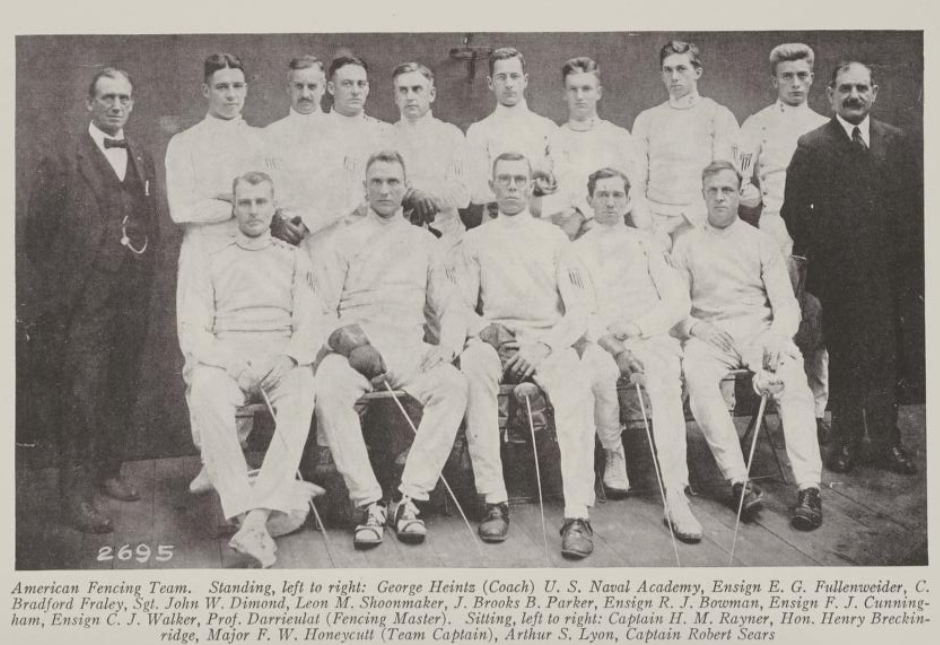
1920 United States Mens Olympic Fencing Team

Nineteen fencers represented the United States in 1920. It was the nation's fourth appearance in the sport. The Americans won a single medal, the bronze in the team foil. It was the country's first fencing medal since hosting the Games in 1904. None of the individual fencers reached an event final, though both teams which had to compete in semifinals did advance.

Ranks given are within the group.

Fencer	Event	First round		Quarterfinals		Semifinals		Final	
Fencer	Event	Result	Rank	Result	Rank	Result	Rank	Result	Rank
Millard Bloomer	Foil	N/A		4–4	5	did not advance			
Roscoe Bowman	Sabre	N/A		3–5	7	did not advance			
Henry Breckinridge	Épée	6–2	1 Q	5–3	5 Q	3–8	10	did not advance	
Henry Breckinridge	Foil	N/A		2–4	4	did not advance			
George Calnan	Foil	N/A		1–4	5	did not advance			
Frederick Cunningham	Sabre	N/A		1–7	9	did not advance			
John Dimond	Épée	2–4	7	did not advance					
John Dimond	Sabre	N/A		1–6	8	did not advance			
Raymond Dutcher	Épée	3–6	7	did not advance					
Edwin Fullinwider	Sabre	N/A		2–5	6	did not advance			
Francis Honeycutt	Foil	N/A		2–2	3 Q	0–5	6	did not advance	
Arthur Lyon	Sabre	N/A		1–6	8	did not advance			
Joseph Parker	Foil	N/A		3–5	6	did not advance			
Joseph Parker	Sabre	N/A		4–3	4 Q	1–5	6	did not advance	
William Russell	Épée	3–4	5 Q	6–5	3 Q	2–9	10	did not advance	
Leonard Schoonmaker	Épée	0–8	9	did not advance					
Leonard Schoonmaker	Foil	N/A		0–5	6	did not advance			
Claiborne Walker	Sabre	N/A		2–4	6	did not advance			
Henry Breckinridge; Francis Honeycutt; Arthur Lyon; Harold Rayner; Robert Sears	Team foil	N/A				1–0	2 Q	2–2	3rd place, bronze medalist(s)
Henry Breckinridge; Ray Dutcher; Arthur Lyon; Harold Rayner; William Russell; Robert Sears	Team épée	N/A				2–3	3 Q	0–5	6
Roscoe Bowman; Frederick Cunningham; John Dimond; Bradford Fraley; Edwin Fullinwider; Arthur Lyon; Brooks Parker; Claiborne Walker	Team sabre	N/A						3–4	5

== Gymnastics ==
Four gymnasts represented the United States in 1920. It was the nation's second appearance in the sport, and first since hosting the Games in 1904.

=== Artistic gymnastics ===
Gymnast	Event	Final	
Gymnast	Event	Result	Rank
Bjørne Jorgensen	All-around	76.71	21
Paul Krempel	All-around	78.00	20
Frank Kriz	All-around	83.10	10
John Mais	All-around	74.10	23

== Ice hockey ==
The United States competed in the inaugural Olympic ice hockey tournament. The team cruised through its quarterfinal, beating Switzerland 29–0. The Americans met Canada in a semifinal matchup; the two were clearly the best teams in the tournament. Canada came out the better, winning 2–0 to send the United States into the silver medal tournament. There, the Americans beat Sweden and Czechoslovakia by a combined score of 23–0 to emerge winners of the silver medal, using the Bergvall System.

Roster

Coach: (United States) Cornelius Fellowes

Pos	Player	GP	G	Birthdate	Age	Club
G	Raymond Bonney	2	0	April 5, 1892	28	Pittsburgh AA
F	Anthony Conroy	4	10	October 19, 1895	24	St. Paul AC
R	Herb Drury	4	14	March 2, 1896	24	Pittsburgh AA
D	Ed Fitzgerald	2	1	August 3, 1890	29	St. Paul AC
D	George Geran	2	3	August 3, 1896	23	Boston AA
R	Frank Goheen	4	7	February 9, 1894	26	St. Paul AC
F	Joe McCormick	3	8	February 9, 1894	26	Pittsburgh AA
F	Larry McCormick	1	7	July 12, 1890	29	Pittsburgh AA
R	Frank Synott	2	1	December 28, 1891	28	Boston AA
D	Leon Tuck	2	1	May 25, 1891	28	Boston AA
G	Cy Weidenborner	2	0	March 30, 1895	25	St. Paul AC

Gold medal Quarterfinals

April 24, 1920; 17:00	United States	29 – 0 (15–0, 14–0)	Switzerland	Palais de Glace d'Anvers

Game reference
Ray Bonney	Goalies	René Savoie	Referee: (United States) Raoul Le Mat
Conroy (8); J. McCormick (7); Drury (6); Goheen (6); Fitzgerald; Tuck / Goals			Referee: (United States) Raoul Le Mat
7 min	Penalties	0 min	Referee: (United States) Raoul Le Mat

Gold medal semifinals

April 25, 1920; 21:00	Canada	2 – 0 (0–0, 2–0)	United States	Palais de Glace d'Anvers

Game reference
Walter Byron	Goalies	Ray Bonney	Referee: (France) Alfred de Rauch
Fredrickson / 1 – 0; Johannesson / 2 – 0			Referee: (France) Alfred de Rauch
7 min	Penalties	5 min	Referee: (France) Alfred de Rauch

Silver medal semifinals

April 27, 1920; 22:00	United States	7 – 0 (5–0, 2–0)	Sweden	Palais de Glace d'Anvers

Game reference
Cy Weidenborner	Goalies	Seth Howander
Drury (4); Geran (3) / Goals
0 min	Penalties	0 min

Silver medal match

April 28, 1920; 22:00	(silver) United States	16 – 0 (7–0, 9–0)	Czechoslovakia	Palais de Glace d'Anvers

Game reference
Cy Weidenborner	Goalies	Jan Peka	Referee: (Belgium) Paul Loicq
L. McCormick (7); Drury (4); Conroy (2); Goheen; J. McCormick; Synott / Goals			Referee: (Belgium) Paul Loicq
0 min	Penalties	0 min	Referee: (Belgium) Paul Loicq

Final rank
(silver) Silver

== Modern pentathlon ==
Two pentathletes represented the United States in 1920. It was the nation's second appearance in the sport, having competed at both instances of the Olympic modern pentathlon.

A point-for-place system was used, with the lowest total score winning.

Pentathlete	Final						
Pentathlete	Riding	Fencing	Shooting	Swimming	Running	Total	Rank
Harold Rayner	5	12	13	14	4	48	6
Robert Sears	3	8	9	11	20	51	8

== Polo ==
The United States competed in the Olympic polo tournament for the second time. The team took the bronze medal, losing to Spain in the semifinals but defeating Belgium in the bronze medal match.

Semifinals

Spain	13–3	United States

Final

United States	11–3	Belgium

Final rank
(bronze) Bronze

== Rowing ==
Fifteen rowers represented the United States in 1920. It was the nation's third appearance in the sport. Three of the four boats took gold medals, with the fourth having to settle for silver after a 4-second loss to Switzerland in the coxed fours final.

Ranks given are within the heat.

Rower	Cox	Event	Quarterfinals		Semifinals		Final	
Rower	Cox	Event	Result	Rank	Result	Rank	Result	Rank
John B. Kelly Sr.	N/A	Single sculls	7:44.2	1 Q	7:46.2	1 Q	7:35.0	1st place, gold medalist(s)
Paul Costello; Jack Kelly	N/A	Double sculls	N/A		7:16.8	1 Q	7:09.0	1st place, gold medalist(s)
Erich Federschmidt; Franz Federschmidt; Carl Klose; Ken Myers	Sherm Clark	Coxed four	N/A		7:17.4	1 Q	6:58.0	2nd place, silver medalist(s)
Vince Gallagher; Edwin Graves; Virgil Jacomini; Donald Johnston; William Jordan; Clyde King; Edward Moore; Alden Sanborn	Sherm Clark	Eight	6:24.0	1 Q	6:24.0	1 Q	6:05.0	1st place, gold medalist(s)

== Rugby union ==
The United States competed in the Olympic rugby tournament for the first time. They faced France in the only match of the tournament, as the two countries were the only ones to compete. The Americans won the match to take the gold medal.

Final

United States	8–0	France
	Report

Attendance: 20,000

Final rank
(gold) Gold

== Skating ==
=== Figure skating ===
Two figure skaters represented the United States in 1920. It was the nation's second appearance in the sport; Sweden was one of three countries to compete in both Summer Olympics figure skating competitions. Weld took the bronze medal in the ladies' singles, with Niles finishing sixth in the men's. The two took fourth place in the pairs competition.

Skater	Event	Final	
Skater	Event	Result	Rank
Nathaniel Niles	Men's singles	49.0	6
Theresa Weld	Ladies' singles	15.5	3rd place, bronze medalist(s)
Nathaniel Niles; Theresa Weld	Pairs	28.5	4

== Shooting ==
Twenty-nine shooters represented the United States in 1920. It was the nation's fourth appearance in the sport. The country took 13 of 21 gold medals, won at least one medal in 18 of the 21 events, and finished with 23 medals—more than twice Norway's 11, which was second-best. The American teams took gold medals in 8 of the 11 team events, with a silver, a bronze, and a fourth-place finish rounding out its team results. In individual competitions, the United States won five golds, three silvers, and five bronzes. Twelve men won individual medals (Nuesslein was the only American shooter to win multiple individual medals), and ten more received medals as parts of teams.

They swept the individual small-bore rifle medals, as well as taking the gold medal in the team event. They repeated this performance in the trap and team clay pigeons events.

The American shooters won both the individual and team golds in the free rifle.

The team took both team pistol golds, as well as one of two individual pistol golds.

The military rifle events gave the United States more trouble; the team won no medal in the individual 300 metre prone event, and took only silver in the team 300 metre standing competition.

The running deer was by far the worst category for the Americans; of the four events, the United States took only a single bronze medal in the team single shots event.

Shooter	Event	Final	
Shooter	Event	Result	Rank
Harry Adams	300 m military rifle, prone	57	Unknown
Mark Arie	Trap	95	1st place, gold medalist(s)
Howard Bayles	30 m military pistol	244	Unknown
Howard Bayles	50 m free pistol	430	Unknown
Horace Bonser	Trap	87	5
Raymond Bracken	30 m military pistol	272	2nd place, silver medalist(s)
Raymond Bracken	50 m free pistol	456	Unknown
Thomas Brown	100 m deer, single shots	33	Unknown
Thomas Brown	100 m deer, double shots	63	Unknown
Dennis Fenton	50 m small-bore rifle	385	3rd place, bronze medalist(s)
Dennis Fenton	300 m free rifle, 3 pos.	960	Unknown
Morris Fisher	300 m free rifle, 3 pos.	996	1st place, gold medalist(s)
George Fiske	50 m free pistol	458	Unknown
Karl Frederick	30 m military pistol	262	Unknown
Karl Frederick	50 m free pistol	496	1st place, gold medalist(s)
Louis Harant	30 m military pistol	264	Unknown
Frederick Hird	300 m military rifle, prone	55	Unknown
Joseph Jackson	300 m military rifle, prone	54	Unknown
Joseph Jackson	600 m military rifle, prone	58	5
Joseph Jackson	100 m deer, single shots	30	Unknown
Joseph Jackson	100 m deer, double shots	61	Unknown
Alfred Lane	30 m military pistol	258	Unknown
Alfred Lane	50 m free pistol	481	3rd place, bronze medalist(s)
Joseph Lawless	600 m military rifle, prone	57	8
Willis A. Lee	50 m small-bore rifle	370	Unknown
Willis A. Lee	300 m free rifle, 3 pos.	965	Unknown
Willis A. Lee	300 m military rifle, prone	56	Unknown
Willis A. Lee	300 m military rifle, standing	48	Unknown
Willis A. Lee	600 m military rifle, prone	56	Unknown
Willis A. Lee	100 m deer, single shots	33	Unknown
Willis A. Lee	100 m deer, double shots	53	Unknown
Elmer Lindroth	600 m military rifle, prone	54	Unknown
Lawrence Nuesslein	50 m small-bore rifle	391	1st place, gold medalist(s)
Lawrence Nuesslein	300 m military rifle, standing	54	3rd place, bronze medalist(s)
Lawrence Nuesslein	100 m deer, single shots	38	7
Lawrence Nuesslein	100 m deer, double shots	64	Unknown
Carl Osburn	300 m free rifle, 3 pos.	980	4
Carl Osburn	300 m military rifle, standing	56	1st place, gold medalist(s)
Frederick Plum	Trap	87	4
Arthur Rothrock	50 m small-bore rifle	386	2nd place, silver medalist(s)
Arthur Rothrock	300 m military rifle, standing	45	Unknown
Oliver Schriver	50 m small-bore rifle	367	Unknown
Lloyd Spooner	300 m free rifle, 3 pos.	975	5
Lloyd Spooner	300 m military rifle, prone	58	6
Lloyd Spooner	300 m military rifle, standing	53	7
Lloyd Spooner	600 m military rifle, prone	59	3rd place, bronze medalist(s)
Lloyd Spooner	100 m deer, single shots	30	Unknown
Lloyd Spooner	100 m deer, double shots	62	Unknown
Frank Troeh	Trap	93	2nd place, silver medalist(s)
Frank Wright	Trap	87	3rd place, bronze medalist(s)
Raymond Bracken; Karl Frederick; Michael Kelly; Alfred Lane; James H. Snook	50 m team free pistol	2372	1st place, gold medalist(s)
Thomas Brown; Willis A. Lee; Lawrence Nuesslein; Carl Osburn; Lloyd Spooner	300 m team military rifle, standing	255	2nd place, silver medalist(s)
Thomas Brown; Willis A. Lee; Lawrence Nuesslein; Carl Osburn; Lloyd Spooner	100 m team deer, single shots	158	3rd place, bronze medalist(s)
Thomas Brown; Willis A. Lee; Lawrence Nuesslein; Carl Osburn; Lloyd Spooner	100 m team deer, double shots	282	4
Dennis Fenton; Morris Fisher; Willis A. Lee; Carl Osburn; Lloyd Spooner	Team free rifle	4876	1st place, gold medalist(s)
Dennis Fenton; Joseph Jackson; Willis A. Lee; Oliver Schriver; Lloyd Spooner	600 m team military rifle, prone	287	1st place, gold medalist(s)
Dennis Fenton; Willis A. Lee; Lawrence Nuesslein; Arthur Rothrock; Oliver Schriver	50 m team small-bore rifle	1899	1st place, gold medalist(s)
Morris Fisher; Joseph Jackson; Willis A. Lee; Carl Osburn; Lloyd Spooner	300 m team military rifle, prone	289	1st place, gold medalist(s)
Karl Frederick; Louis Harant; Michael Kelly; Alfred Lane; James H. Snook	30 m team military pistol	1310	1st place, gold medalist(s)
Joseph Jackson; Willis A. Lee; Carl Osburn; Oliver Schriver; Lloyd Spooner	300 & 600 m team military rifle, prone	573	1st place, gold medalist(s)
Mark Arie; Horace Bonser; Jay Clark; Forest McNeir; Frank Troeh; Frank Wright	Team clay pigeons	547	1st place, gold medalist(s)

== Tug of war ==
The United States competed in the Olympic tug of war tournament for the third time in 1920, the final appearance of the sport in the Olympics. The Americans joined the British in tying Sweden's mark for most appearances in the short life of tug of war at the Olympics at three of five.

The Bergvall System was used in 1920. The Americans lost in the quarterfinals to eventual gold-medallist Great Britain, thus putting the United States in contention for the silver medal. In the silver medal semifinals, they were defeated by Belgium. They won their first match of the tournament in the bronze medal semifinals, defeating Italy, before again losing to Belgium in the bronze medal match. The United States finished in fourth place of the five teams.

All matches were best-of-three pulls.

Quarterfinals

Great Britain	2–0	United States

Silver medal semifinals

Belgium	2–0	United States

Bronze medal semifinals

United States	2–0	Italy

Bronze medal match

United States	0–2	Belgium

Final rank
4th

== Wrestling ==
Eighteen wrestlers competed for the United States in 1920, tying Finland for most wrestlers that year. It was the nation's fourth appearance in the sport, matching Great Britain for most to that point. The American wrestlers took six medals, including one gold medal, and finished third on the medals leaderboard, behind Finland with five golds and Sweden with three golds. Ackerly was the American gold medalist, finishing 1–2 with Gerson in the freestyle featherweight. Metropoulos and Pendleton competed in both freestyle and Greco-Roman events, as the United States entered two wrestlers in each weight class. Most of the American success came in the freestyle competitions, with all six medals coming in that discipline.

=== Freestyle ===
Wrestler	Event	Round of 32	Round of 16	Quarterfinals	Semifinals	Finals / Bronze match	Rank
Charles Ackerly	Featherweight	N/A	Dialetis (GRE) (W)	Kaiser (SUI) (W)	Bernard (GBR) (W)	Gerson (USA) (W)	1st place, gold medalist(s)
Angus Frantz	Middleweight	Bye	Bacon (GBR) (W)	Borgström (SWE) (W)	Penttala (FIN) (L)	Johnson (USA) (L)	4
Sam Gerson	Featherweight	N/A	Mäkinen (FIN) (W)	Barathon (FRA) (W)	Shinde (IND) (W)	Ackerly (USA) (L)	2nd place, silver medalist(s)
Charley Johnson	Middleweight	Locon (CAN) (W)	Navale (IND) (W)	Grimstad (NOR) (W)	Leino (FIN) (L)	Frantz (USA) (W)	3rd place, bronze medalist(s)
Walter Maurer	Light heavyweight	N/A	Ledron (FRA) (W)	Westerlund (FIN) (W)	Larsson (SWE) (L)	Redman (USA) (W)	3rd place, bronze medalist(s)
George Metropoulos	Lightweight	N/A	Svensson (SWE) (L)	did not advance			8
Fred Meyer	Heavyweight	N/A		Mason (GBR) (W)	Roth (SUI) (L)	Nilsson (SWE) (D)	3rd place, bronze medalist(s)
Nat Pendleton	Heavyweight	N/A		Mattsson (FIN) (W)	Nilsson (SWE) (W)	Roth (SUI) (L)	2nd place, silver medalist(s)
John Redman	Light heavyweight	N/A	Bye	Wilson (GBR) (W)	Courant (SUI) (L)	Maurer (USA) (L)	4
Joseph Shimmon	Lightweight	N/A	Bye	Anttila (FIN) (L)	did not advance		5

Opponent nation	Wins	Losses	Percent
Canada	1	0	1.000
Finland	3	3	.500
France	2	0	1.000
Great Britain	4	0	1.000
Greece	1	0	1.000
India	2	0	1.000
Norway	1	0	1.000
Sweden	2.5	2.5	.500
Switzerland	1	3	.250
Total international	17.5	8.5	.673
United States	3	3	.500
Total	20.5	11.5	.641

Round	Wins	Losses	Percent
Round of 32	1	0	1.000
Round of 16	5	1	.833
Quarterfinals	8	1	.889
Semifinals	3	5	.375
Final	1	2	.333
Bronze match	2.5	2.5	.500
Total	20.5	11.5	.641

=== Greco-Roman ===
Wrestler	Event	Round of 32	Round of 16	Quarterfinals	Semifinals	Finals	Rank
Wrestler	Event	Round of 32	Round of 16	Silver quarters	Silver semis	Silver match	Rank
Wrestler	Event	Round of 32	Round of 16	Bronze quarters	Bronze semis	Bronze match	Rank
Adrian Brian	Featherweight	Dialetis (GRE) (W)	Kähkönen (FIN) (L)	did not advance			7
Adrian Brian	Featherweight	Dialetis (GRE) (W)	Kähkönen (FIN) (L)	N/A	did not advance		7
Adrian Brian	Featherweight	Dialetis (GRE) (W)	Kähkönen (FIN) (L)	Torgensen (DEN) (L)	did not advance		7
Daniel V. Gallery	Featherweight	van Maaren (NED) (W)	Friman (FIN) (L)	did not advance			8
Daniel V. Gallery	Featherweight	van Maaren (NED) (W)	Friman (FIN) (L)	N/A	Boumans (BEL) (L)	Did not advance	8
Daniel V. Gallery	Featherweight	van Maaren (NED) (W)	Friman (FIN) (L)	did not advance			8
Frank Maichle	Light heavyweight	Bye	Ohlsson (SWE) (W)	Tetens (DEN) (L)	did not advance		7
Frank Maichle	Light heavyweight	Bye	Ohlsson (SWE) (W)	N/A	did not advance		7
Frank Maichle	Light heavyweight	Bye	Ohlsson (SWE) (W)	N/A			7
George Metropoulos	Lightweight	Bye	Vouyoukos (GRE) (W)	Frisenfeldt (DEN) (L)	did not advance		10
George Metropoulos	Lightweight	Bye	Vouyoukos (GRE) (W)	did not advance			10
George Metropoulos	Lightweight	Bye	Vouyoukos (GRE) (W)	did not advance			10
Nat Pendleton	Light heavyweight	Bye	Eriksen (DEN) (L)	did not advance			10
Nat Pendleton	Light heavyweight	Bye	Eriksen (DEN) (L)	N/A	did not advance		10
Nat Pendleton	Light heavyweight	Bye	Eriksen (DEN) (L)	N/A			10
Oral Swigart	Lightweight	Ranghieri (ITA) (W)	Janssens (BEL) (L)	did not advance			12
Oral Swigart	Lightweight	Ranghieri (ITA) (W)	Janssens (BEL) (L)	did not advance			12
Oral Swigart	Lightweight	Ranghieri (ITA) (W)	Janssens (BEL) (L)	did not advance			12
Henry Szymanski	Middleweight	Bye	Huml (TCH) (W)	Stensrud (NOR) (W)	Lindfors (FIN) (L)	Did not advance	7
Henry Szymanski	Middleweight	Bye	Huml (TCH) (W)	did not advance			7
Henry Szymanski	Middleweight	Bye	Huml (TCH) (W)	Johnsen (NOR) (L)	did not advance		7
Alexander Weyand	Heavyweight	Bye	Hansen (DEN) (L)	did not advance			5
Alexander Weyand	Heavyweight	Bye	Hansen (DEN) (L)	did not advance			5
Alexander Weyand	Heavyweight	Bye	Hansen (DEN) (L)	Bye	Dame (FRA) (W)	Nieminen (FIN) (L)	5
Edward Willkie	Heavyweight	Struna (TCH) (W)	Lindfors (FIN) (L)	did not advance			5
Edward Willkie	Heavyweight	Struna (TCH) (W)	Lindfors (FIN) (L)	Bye	Ahlgren (SWE) (W)	Hansen (DEN) (L)	5
Edward Willkie	Heavyweight	Struna (TCH) (W)	Lindfors (FIN) (L)	Gasiglia (FRA) (W)	Nieminen (FIN) (L)	Did not advance	5
Paul Zanoline	Middleweight	Bye	Vanderleenden (BEL) (L)	did not advance			13
Paul Zanoline	Middleweight	Bye	Vanderleenden (BEL) (L)	did not advance			13
Paul Zanoline	Middleweight	Bye	Vanderleenden (BEL) (L)	did not advance			13

Opponent nation	Wins	Losses	Percent
Belgium	0	3	.000
Czechoslovakia	2	0	1.000
Denmark	0	6	.000
Finland	0	6	.000
France	2	0	1.000
Greece	2	0	1.000
Italy	1	0	1.000
Netherlands	1	0	1.000
Norway	1	1	.500
Sweden	2	0	1.000
Total	11	16	.407

Round	Wins	Losses	Percent
Round of 32	4	0	1.000
Round of 16	3	7	.300
Quarterfinals	1	2	.333
Semifinals	0	1	.000
Final	0	0	–
Silver quarterfinals	0	0	–
Silver semifinals	1	1	.500
Silver match	0	1	.000
Bronze quarterfinals	1	2	.333
Bronze semifinals	1	1	.500
Bronze match	0	1	.000
Total	11	16	.407

== See also ==
- Mutiny of the Matoika, an account of travel by the U.S. Olympic team to the 1920 Summer Olympics
