= Shooting at the 1920 Summer Olympics – Men's 100 meter running deer, double shots =

Men's 100 meter running deer, double shots at the Games of the VII Olympiad
- Venue: Hoogboom Military Camp
- Date: 27 July 1920
- Competitors: 8 from 3 nations

Medalists
1st place, gold medalist(s)		Ole Lilloe-Olsen	Norway
2nd place, silver medalist(s)		Fredric Landelius	Sweden
3rd place, bronze medalist(s)		Einar Liberg	Norway

The 100 meter running deer, double shots was a shooting sports event held as part of the Shooting at the 1920 Summer Olympics programme. It was the third appearance for the event. The competition was held on 27 July 1920. 8 shooters competed from 3 nations competed.

== Results ==
Place	Shooter	Total
1	Ole Lilloe-Olsen (NOR)	82
2	Fredric Landelius (SWE)	77
3	Einar Liberg (NOR)	71
-	Alfred Swahn (SWE)	67
-	Lawrence Nuesslein (USA)	64
-	Thomas Brown (USA)	63
-	Lloyd Spooner (USA)	62
-	Joseph Jackson (USA)	61
-	Willis A. Lee (USA)	53
