= Shooting at the 1920 Summer Olympics – Men's 300 metre military rifle, standing =

Men's 300 metre military rifle, standing at the Games of the VII Olympiad
- Venue: Beverloo Camp
- Dates: 29–30 July 1920
- Competitors: 16 from 7 nations

Medalists
1st place, gold medalist(s)		Carl Osburn	United States
2nd place, silver medalist(s)		Lars Jørgen Madsen	Denmark
3rd place, bronze medalist(s)		Lawrence Nuesslein	United States

The 300 metre military rifle, standing was a shooting sports event held as part of the Shooting at the 1920 Summer Olympics programme. It was the fourth appearance for military rifle events and the second time that medals were awarded for the prone position. The first time was the competition in 1900. The competition was held on 29 and 30 July 1920. 16 shooters from 7 nations competed.

== Results ==
The maximum score was 60.

Place	Shooter	Total	Shoot-off
1	Carl Osburn (USA)	56	
2	Lars Jørgen Madsen (DEN)	55	
3	Lawrence Nuesslein (USA)	54	56
4	Erik Sætter-Lassen (DEN)	54	51
5	Joseph Janssens (BEL)	54	47
6	Ricardo Ticchi (ITA)	54	44
7	Anders Peter Nielsen (DEN)	53	
7	Anders Petersen (DEN)	53	
7	Lloyd Spooner (USA)	53	
-	Anton Dahl (NOR)	52	
-	Magnus Wegelius (FIN)	51	
-	Niels Larsen (DEN)	51	
-	Willis A. Lee (USA)	48	
-	Arthur Rothrock (USA)	45	
-	Léon Johnson (FRA)	unknown	
-	Achille Paroche (FRA)	unknown	
