= Mutiny of the Matoika =

Complaints regarding the 1920 Princess Matoika model

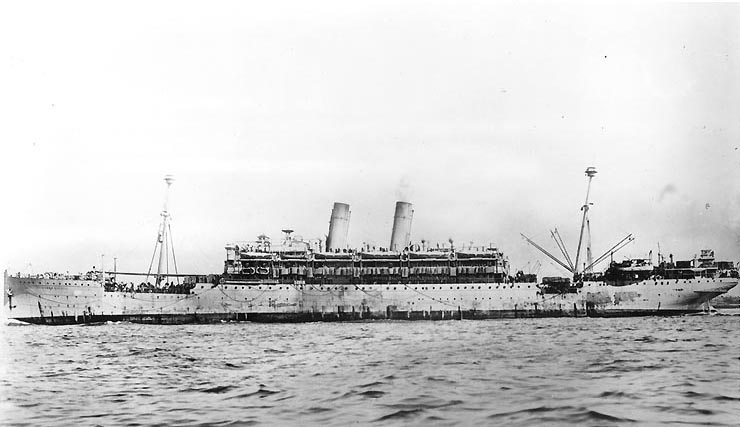
Princess Matoika, seen here in U.S. Navy service in 1919, was a last-minute substitution to carry most of the U.S. Olympic team to Antwerp for the 1920 Olympics.

Mutiny of the Matoika is the common name for the events in July 1920 involving a large portion of the 1920 United States Olympic team while on board the U.S. Army transport ship Princess Matoika, headed to Antwerp for the 1920 Summer Olympics. Princess Matoika was a last-minute substitute for another ship and, according to the athletes, did not have adequate accommodations or training facilities on board. Near the end of the voyage, the athletes published a list of grievances and demands and distributed copies of the document to the United States Secretary of War, the American Olympic Committee (AOC) members, and the press. The incident received wide coverage in American newspapers at the time and was still being discussed in the popular press years later. The event was not an actual mutiny, but has been called that since the mid-1930s.

The conditions on the Princess Matoika were terrible, as the hold reeked of formaldehyde from the dead bodies of the recently deceased American World War I soldiers, and there was no place to train. Furthermore, the athletes were dissatisfied with the quality of food and huge numbers of rats present on the ship. Near the end of the voyage, the athletes published a list of grievances and demands and distributed copies of the document to the United States Secretary of War, the American Olympic Committee members, and the press. Among these were the demands for better accommodations in Antwerp, cabin passage home, and railroad fare from New York to their home cities. The incident received wide coverage in American newspapers at the time.

== Background ==
In 1920, the number of ocean liners carrying passengers on the North Atlantic gradually increased, but was still far below the pre-war years; arrivals at Atlantic ports in the United States were still down some 60% from pre-war numbers. With the fewer ships and sailings available, the AOC made arrangements with both the U.S. Army and the U.S. Navy to transport the United States Olympic team to Antwerp. The Navy agreed to carry team members who were affiliated with their branch of the service, and the Army, to carry civilian and Army-affiliated competitors. The Olympic trip got off to a bad start when the Army's scheduled ship, Northern Pacific, was declared unseaworthy, requiring a last-minute substitution. The hurried selection of the Matoika meant the original planned departure date, July 20, had to be pushed back by six days to ready the liner to sail.

The Matoika had been in the service of the U.S. Army as a transport ship since September 1919, and, until the time of her selection, had been returning American soldiers from Europe and repatriating the remains of Americans killed during the war. Before World War I, the Matoika had been a passenger liner for North German Lloyd by the name of Princess Alice. After the United States joined the conflict in 1917, the liner had been pressed into service for the U.S. Navy carrying American troops to Europe; she was renamed Princess Matoika, after one of the given names for Pocahontas, as part of an order to replace Germanic names of seized ships with American names.

== Voyage ==
On the afternoon of July 26, the athletes attended a farewell reception at the Manhattan Opera House presided over by Gustavus T. Kirby, chairman of the American Olympic Committee (AOC), who read congratulatory telegrams to the team from the governors of eleven states. At the end of the reception, the 230 civilian and U.S. Army-affiliated team members marched from the Opera House to the Hudson Pier and ferried to Hoboken, New Jersey, and the waiting Matoika. (The 101 U.S. Navy-affiliated athletes and coaches were carried on cruiser USS Frederick, a frequent convoy escort of Princess Matoika during World War I.)

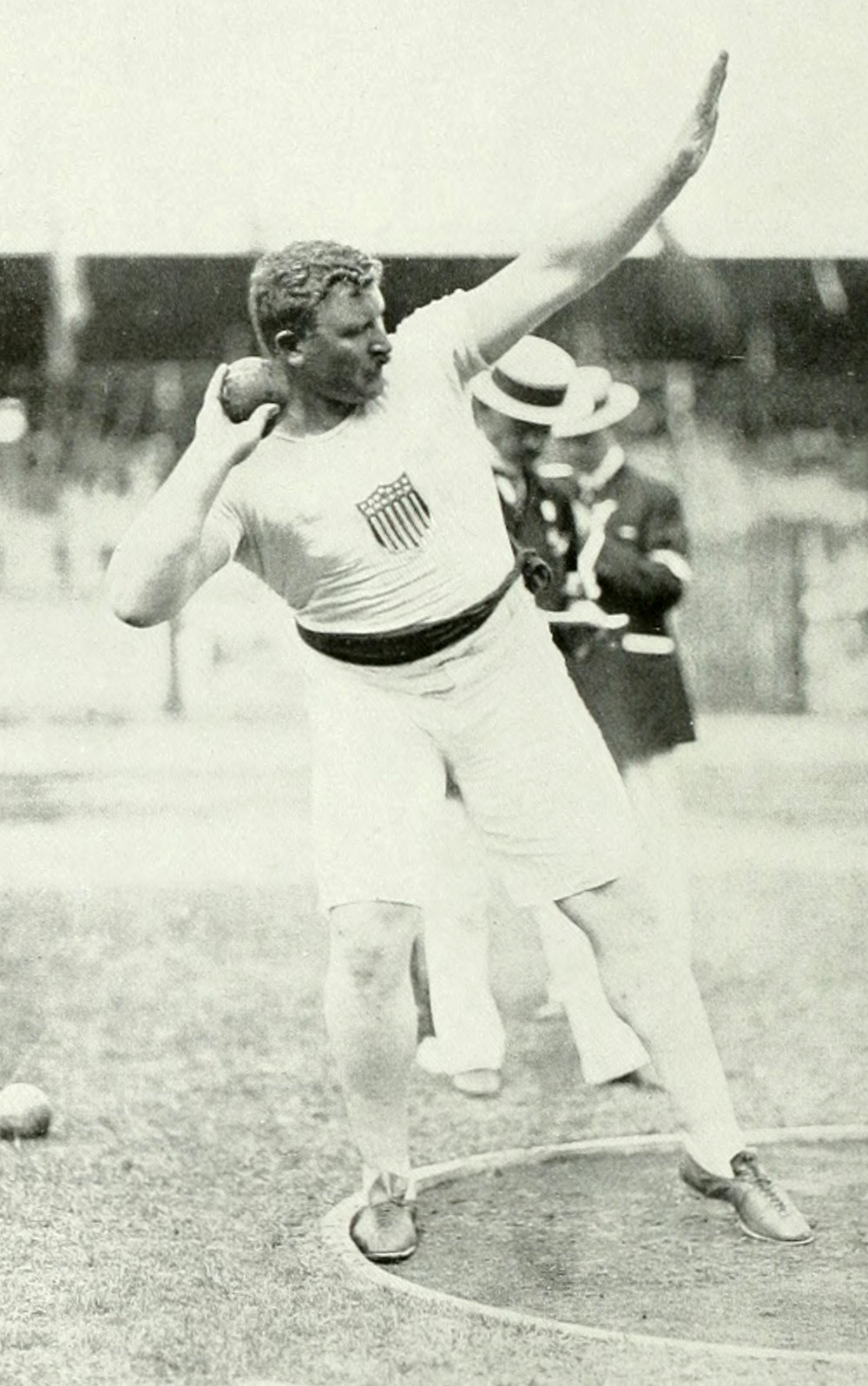
American shot putter Pat McDonald (seen here in the 1912 Summer Olympics) was one of the ringleaders of the "Mutiny of the Matoika"

When female team members, AOC members, and U.S. Army athletes and officials accompanying the team were assigned first-class cabins and the balance of the male athletes were relegated to troop quarters on lower decks, grumbling from team members quartered belowdecks began almost immediately. Before the Matoika even sailed, runner Joie Ray, a competitor in the 1500 meters in 1920, complained about the conditions declaring that "if those in charge had deliberately tried to create a psychology of depression and resentment among the members of the team, they couldn't have done anything more effective". Two days after sailing, some of the first-place winners at the Olympic tryouts were moved to the sick bay to escape the sweltering heat on the lower decks, but the majority remained below. Fencer Joseph B. B. Parker—who, as an Army athlete, was bunked in a cabin—commented that the troop accommodations were all right for troops but "not conducive to bringing men to the games in the pink of condition."

Training conditions aboard the ship were less than ideal throughout the voyage. Rough seas for parts of the journey hampered training and contributed to widespread seasickness. Although the long distance runners were able to practice by making multiple circuits of the ship, the sprinters and hurdlers were provided only a 70-yard (64 m) cork track—two-thirds the length of the shortest track event at the games—on which to practice. Javelins were tethered by rope and aimed by their throwers at the sea, and, when thrown, would often come down in unexpected locations. The only facility for swimmers was a canvas saltwater tank set up on the lower deck; the tank split when filled for the first time. Even after it was repaired, the best the swimmers could do was to practice strokes while tied to the corner of the tank with a rope, and divers, with no other facilities available, were allocated just a few minutes a day in the tank. Conditions on the ship contributed to several injuries to athletes. During foggy weather, American decathlete Everett Ellis fell on the slippery deck, suffering a bad sprain, and shot putter Pat McDonald sprained his thumb while tossing a medicine ball on the pitching deck.

Despite the problems encountered by some of the team, others were able to work out adequately. Fencers, wrestlers, and boxers were all able to work out in close-to-usual routines. But perhaps the most impressive training feat was a high jump by Richmond W. Landon who cleared a 5-foot-10-inch (1.78 m) high jump on the rolling deck. He later achieved a gold-medal-winning (and Olympic record) jump of 6 feet 4.2 inches (1.935 m).

== The "mutiny" ==
By the time the ship neared Antwerp, the team members had had enough of the "rusty old troop carrier". The team initially threatened to boycott the games if the conditions in the host city were not better than those aboard the Matoika, but quickly rescinded that. The group, with McDonald and Norman Ross serving as ringleaders, drafted a resolution in which they condemned the AOC and outlined their grievances and demands:

- the quarters aboard the ship were unlivable
- the food on board was terrible
- they requested better accommodation in Antwerp
- they requested cabin passage on the way home
- and they requested train fare to their homes from New York after returning.

They were careful to give credit to the crew of Princess Matoika who, in the athletes' assessment, did "everything possible to improve conditions". The document was signed by 150 of the athletes; some of the U.S. Army athletes agreed with the resolution but could not sign it. They had 200 copies of the resolution printed and addressed copies to Secretary of War Newton Diehl Baker, the members of the AOC, and members of the press.

== Aftermath ==
After the Olympics were over, fencer Joseph B. B. Parker summarized the situation by saying that all who made the trip would want to compete for the United States in future Olympics, but "never again … under the management of the Executive Committee of the Olympic team of 1920". In 1922, author Newton Fuessle brought up the specter of the 1920 Olympic passage on the Matoika when discussing the National Collegiate Athletic Association (NCAA) and his hopes that the NCAA would take over the functions of the Amateur Athletic Union in controlling American Olympic teams in the future.

By the mid-1930s, the events on board were known as the "Mutiny of the Matoika". Sportswriter John Kieran, in his 1936 book The Story of the Olympic Games: 776 B.C. to 1936 A.D., related the story of the mutiny by that name.
