= 1920 Summer Olympics medal table =

1920 Summer Olympics medals
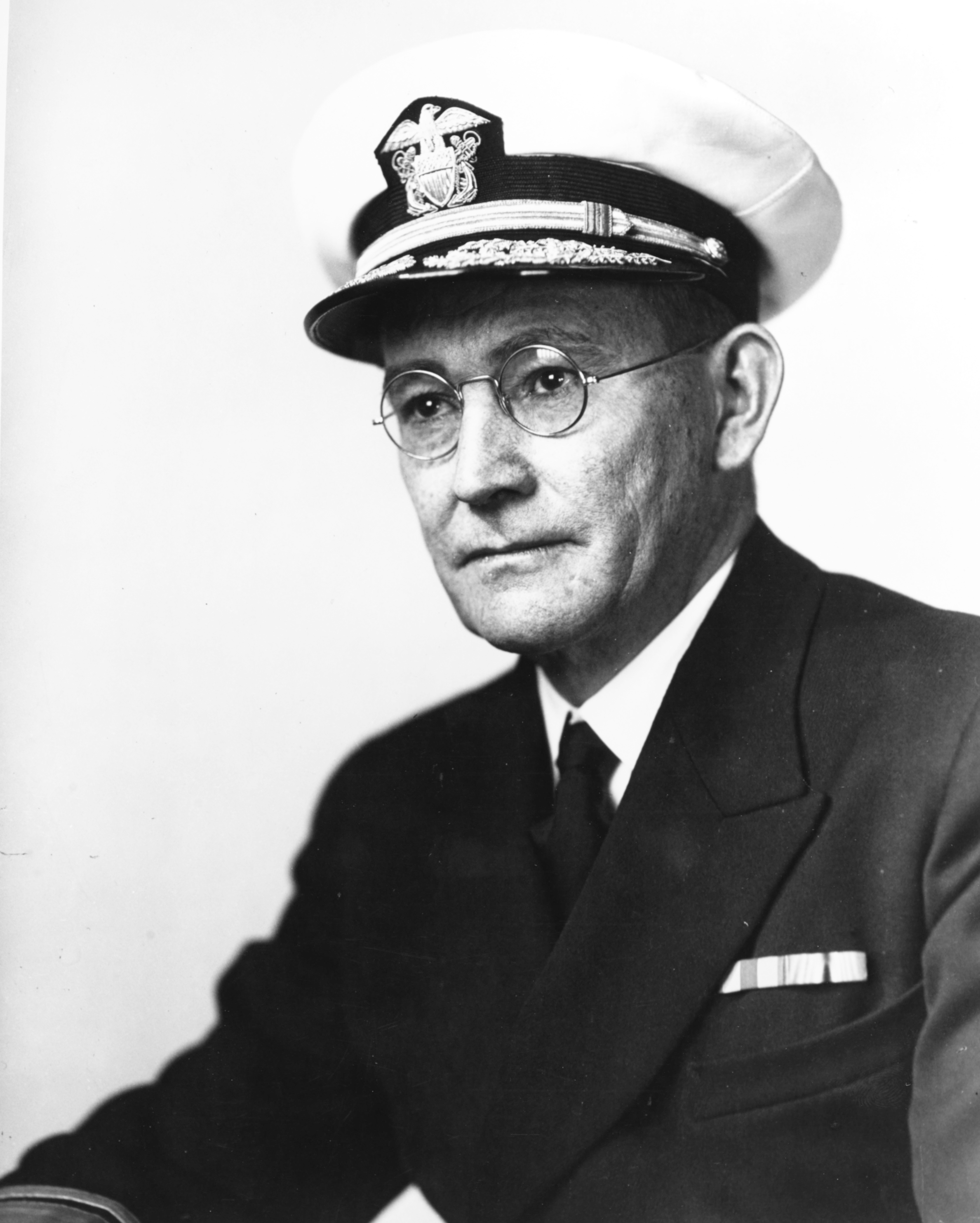
- American athlete Willis Lee won seven medals at the 1920 Summer Olympics, the most of any competing athlete.
- Location: Antwerp, Belgium

Highlights
- Most gold medals: United States (41)
- Most total medals: United States (95)
- Medalling NOCs: 22

World map showing the medal achievements of each country during the 1920 Summer Olympics Legend: represents countries that won at least one gold medal. represents countries that won at least one silver medal but no gold medals. represents countries that won at least one bronze medal (no gold or silver). represents participating countries that did not win medals. represents entities that did not participate at the 1920 Summer Olympics.

The 1920 Summer Olympics, now officially known as the Games of the VII Olympiad, were an international multi-sport event held in Antwerp, Belgium, from August 14 to September 12, 1920. A total of 2,622 athletes representing 29 National Olympic Committees (NOCs) participated. The games featured 162 events in 29 disciplines. (Note: Including the art competition) Willis Lee won five gold medals and 7 total medals at the 1920 Summer Olympics, the most of any competing athlete.

== Medal table ==
The medal table is based on information provided by the International Olympic Committee (IOC) and is consistent with IOC conventional sorting in its published medal tables. The table uses the Olympic medal table sorting method. By default, the table is ordered by the number of gold medals the athletes from a nation have won, where a nation is an entity represented by a NOC. The number of silver medals is taken into consideration next and then the number of bronze medals. If teams are still tied, equal ranking is given and they are listed alphabetically by their IOC country code.

- Medal table does not include art competition medals

* Host nation (Belgium)

1920 Summer Olympics medal table
Rank	Nation	Gold	Silver	Bronze	Total
1	United States	41	27	27	95
2	Sweden	19	20	25	64
3	Finland	15	10	9	34
4	Great Britain	14	15	13	42
5	Belgium*	14	11	11	36
6	Norway	13	9	9	31
7	Italy	13	5	5	23
8	France	9	19	13	41
9	Netherlands	4	2	5	11
10	Denmark	3	9	1	13
11	South Africa	3	4	3	10
12	Canada	3	3	3	9
13	Switzerland	2	2	7	11
14	Estonia	1	2	0	3
15	Brazil	1	1	1	3
16	Australia	0	2	1	3
17	Japan	0	2	0	2
17	Spain	0	2	0	2
19	Greece	0	1	0	1
19	Luxembourg	0	1	0	1
21	Czechoslovakia	0	0	2	2
22	New Zealand	0	0	1	1
Totals (22 entries)		155	147	136	438
