= Wrestling at the 1920 Summer Olympics – Men's freestyle heavyweight =

Wrestling at the Olympics

Men's heavyweight freestyle wrestling at the Games of the VII Olympiad
- Venue: Olympisch Stadion
- Dates: August 25–27, 1920
- Competitors: 8 from 5 nations

Medalists
1st place, gold medalist(s)		Robert Roth	Switzerland
2nd place, silver medalist(s)		Nat Pendleton	United States
3rd place, bronze medalist(s)		Fred Meyer	United States
3rd place, bronze medalist(s)		Ernst Nilsson	Sweden

The men's freestyle heavyweight was a Catch as Catch Can wrestling, later freestyle, event held as part of the wrestling at the 1920 Summer Olympics programme. It was the third appearance of the weight class. Heavyweight was the heaviest category, and included wrestlers weighing over 80 kilograms.

A total of eight wrestlers from five nations competed in the event, which was held from Wednesday, August 25 to Friday, August 27, 1920.

== Results ==
Quarterfinals; August 25
Robert Roth (SUI)	W
Jussi Salila (FIN)	L
Fred Meyer (USA)	W
Frederick Mason (GBR)	L
Nat Pendleton (USA)	W
Sven Mattsson (FIN)	L
Ernst Nilsson (SWE)	W
Archie MacDonald (GBR)	L

Semifinals; August 27
Robert Roth (SUI)	W
Fred Meyer (USA)	L
Nat Pendleton (USA)	W
Ernst Nilsson (SWE)	L

Final; August 27
Robert Roth (SUI)	W
Nat Pendleton (USA)	L
Third place
Fred Meyer (USA)	draw
Ernst Nilsson (SWE)	draw
