= Diving at the 1920 Summer Olympics – Women's 3 metre springboard =

Women's 3 metre springboard diving at the Games of the VII Olympiad
- Venue: Stade Nautique d'Antwerp
- Date: 29 August
- Competitors: 4 from 1 nation

Medalists
1st place, gold medalist(s)		Aileen Riggin	United States
2nd place, silver medalist(s)		Helen Wainwright	United States
3rd place, bronze medalist(s)		Thelma Payne	United States

The women's 3 metre springboard was presented to the Olympic Games for the first time as one of five diving events on the diving at the 1920 Summer Olympics programme. The competition was held on Monday, 29 August 1920. Four divers, all from the United States, competed.

== Results ==
The event was held on Monday, 29 August 1920.

Since there were only four entries, the divers and officials agreed to scratch the qualifying round and compete in a direct final.

Place	Diver	Nation	Points	Score
1st place, gold medalist(s)	Aileen Riggin	United States	9	539.9
2nd place, silver medalist(s)	Helen Wainwright	United States	9	534.8
3rd place, bronze medalist(s)	Thelma Payne	United States	12	534.1
4	Aileen Allen	United States	20	489.8
