= Charlotte Epstein =

American Olympic swim team coach (1884–1938)

Personal information
- Born: September 1884 New York, New York, U.S.
- Died: August 26, 1938 (aged 53) New York, New York
- Occupations: Manager, founder Women's Swimming Association; New York; 1917-1939

Charlotte "Eppy" Epstein (1884–1938) was an American swimming coach who managed the United States Women's Olympic Swimming Team in the 1920s. She was best known for founding the National Women's Life Saving League in 1914, and the New York's Women's Swimming Association (WSA), which she managed from 1917 to 1939. Known as "Mother of Women's Swimming in America", she helped enable women to become members of the American Athletic Union, to first participate in Olympic swimming competition in 1920, to wear more comfortable, practical and faster swim suits, to swim distance events rather than solely sprint events, and eventually to obtain the vote. During her time with the WSA, her swimmers held 51 world records, and captured 202 individual AAU Women's National Senior Championships in both swimming and diving.

== Career ==
Epstein was born in New York City in September, 1884, to Morris and Sara (Rosenau) Epstein.

In 1914, she founded the National Women's Life Saving League, which offered competitive swimming, lessons, and socialization for female swimmers. That same year she convinced the board of directors of the Amateur Athletic Union to allow female swimmers to register as AAU athletes.

In 1917, she was working as a stenographer when she founded the Women's Swimming Association (WSA) with the help of a few other friends. She worked for most of her life as a court stenographer with the Domestic Relations Court in New York City. The WSA became famous for promoting the health benefits of swimming as exercise, and the club would also teach diving. This was at a time when women were not viewed as athletic, and exercise was not considered beneficial to female health. Prior to founding the WSA, Epstein started the National Women's Life Saving League to help create a swimming culture for women and girls. Epstein managed the Women's Olympic Swimming Team in the 1920s, and was able to guide many of the WSA members to victory. Swimmers under her management, known as "Eppie's Swimmers," won 30 national championships, while setting 52 world records. A gifted administrator, in 1929, Epstein served as President of the WSA.

=== Promoting women's rights ===
As a swimming suffragist, she battled for women's suffrage, staging “suffrage swim races” with her teammates, as well as battling for emancipation in women's sports campaigning for bathing suit reform, distance swims for women, and more AAU swimming events for women. Epstein served as the team leader for Olympian Gertrude Ederle, who learned to swim at the Women's Swimming Association. In 1926 Ederle became the first woman to swim the English Channel beating the men's time by over two hours.

== Olympic and AAU administration ==
Epstein achieved the official position of Olympic team manager of the U.S. Women's Swimming Team in the 1920, 1924, and 1932 Games. She attended the Games in 1928, but did not serve as an Olympic official. In the 1932, she was the Assistant Manager of the U.S. Olympic Swim Team, the first woman to be formally recognized with the title. She was well known as a spokesperson for female athletes. Though she had been offered to coach and manage the team that year, she boycotted the 1936 Summer Olympics in Berlin to protest Nazi policies. During her career, she was appointed chair of both the U.S. Olympic Women's Swimming Committee, and chair of the national women's swimming committee of the Amateur Athletic Union.

In 1935, Epstein chaired the swimming committee tasked with administering the trials and for selecting the teams for the second Maccabiah Games in Tel Aviv, Israel known as the Jewish Olympics.

=== Outstanding WSA swimmers ===
Louis Handley, a 1904 Olympic gold medalist in swimming and water polo, coached New York's Women's Swimming Association. The team contained many exceptional women swimmers including Olympians Gertrude Ederle, Aileen Riggin, Eleanor Holm, Helen Wainwright, Adelaide Lambert, Charlotte Boyle, high diver Helen Meany, and Ethelda Bleibtrey. Handley, as well as other American coaches of the period including William Bachrach of the Illinois Athletic Club, advocated a 10-beat kick for each full two strokes of his swimmer's arms. Handley accepted a lower beat count, but approved of increasing the count from 4 kicks per full arm cycle. Many former coaches had considered the American crawl to have originally been designed to have four kicks to one cycle of the arms. Several of Handley's swimmers, including Adelaide Lambert were known for a fast kick, particularly in sprint races.

She died at 53 on Friday, August 26, 1938, at her home at the Hotel Ruxton on New York City's 72nd Street after suffering from illness for close to a year. She had been serving as chairman of both the National Women's Swimming Committee of the Amateur Athletic Union, and the United States Olympic Women's swimming committee for the last two years of her life.

== Honors ==
- 1974, inducted to the International Swimming Hall of Fame
- 1982, inducted to the Jewish Sports Hall of Fame, in Israel
- 1994, first woman inducted into the B'nai B'rith Klutznick National Jewish Museum, Jewish Sports Hall of Fame in Washington, D.C.

== See also ==
- List of members of the International Swimming Hall of Fame
- List of select Jewish coaches
