= Jacksontown, Ohio =

- Census-designated place
- Location within Ohio Location within the United States
- Coordinates: 39°57′38″N 82°24′47″W
- Country: United States
- State: Ohio
- County: Licking
- Township: Licking

Area
  - Total: 1.36 sq mi (3.51 km^{2})
  - Land: 1.34 sq mi (3.47 km^{2})
  - Water: 0.019 sq mi (0.05 km^{2})
- Elevation: 984 ft (300 m)

Population (2020)
  - Total: 402
  - Density: 300/sq mi (115.9/km^{2})
- Time zone: UTC-5 (Eastern (EST))
  - Summer (DST): UTC-4 (EDT)
- FIPS code: 39-38276
- GNIS feature ID: 2812826

Jacksontown is a census-designated place (CDP) in central Licking Township, Licking County, Ohio, United States. It has a post office with the ZIP code 43030. It lies at the intersection of U.S. Route 40 with State Route 13. As of the 2020 census, Jacksontown had a population of 402.

Jacksontown is the birthplace of Carl Osburn, winner of five Olympic gold medals, four silver medals and two bronze. It is also the headquarters for the Ohio Department of Transportation's (ODOT) District 5.

== History ==
Jacksontown was originally called Jackson, and under the latter name was laid out in 1829. The community was named after Andrew Jackson, seventh President of the United States. A post office has been in operation under the name Jacksontown since 1831.

== Demographics ==
Historical population
Census	Pop.	Note	%±
2020	402		—
U.S. Decennial Census
