= Anton Dahl =

Norwegian sports shooter (1882–1952)

Personal information
- Born: 19 December 1882 Bangsund, Norway
- Died: 3 November 1952 (aged 69) Steinkjer, Norway

Sport
- Sport: Sports shooting

Anton Edvart Dahl (19 December 1882 – 3 November 1952) was a Norwegian sports shooter. He competed in the 300m military rifle event at the 1920 Summer Olympics.
