= Harold Rayner =

American fencer

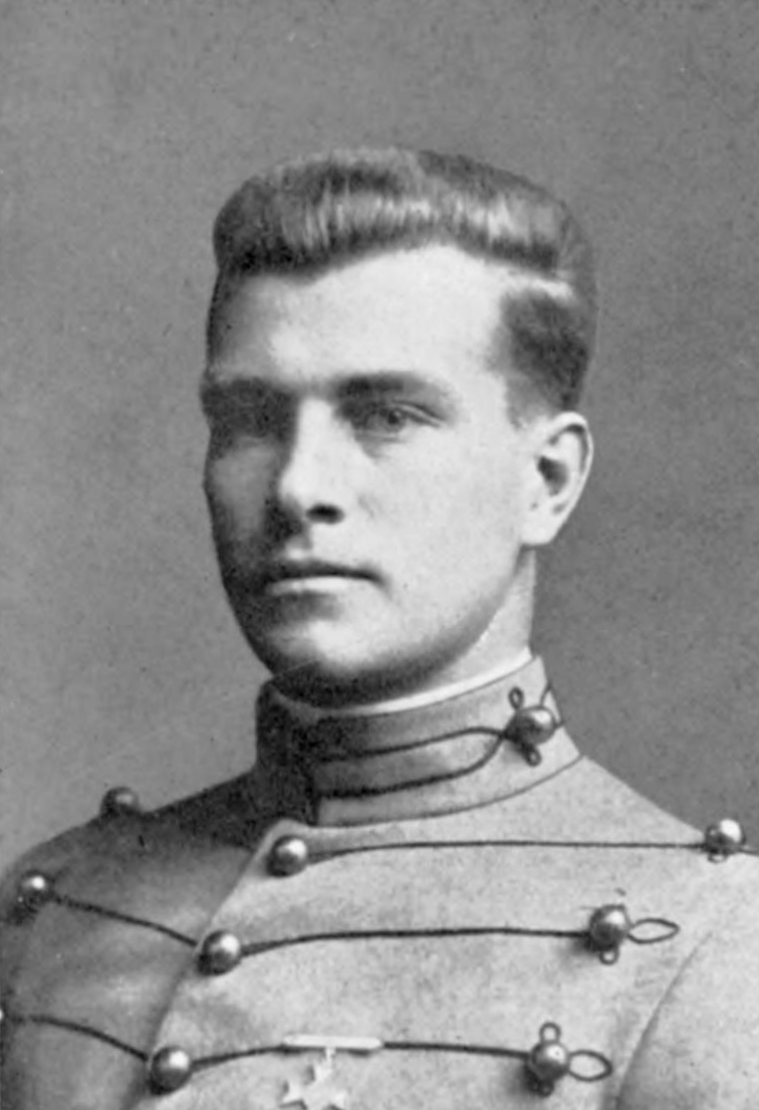

Personal information
- Full name: Harold Marvin Rayner
- Born: July 27, 1888 Glen Ridge, New Jersey, United States
- Died: December 8, 1954 (aged 66) Montrose, New York, United States

Sport
- Sport: Fencing, modern pentathlon
Medal record
Men's fencing
Representing United States
Olympic Games
| Bronze medal – third place | 1920 Antwerp | Foil, team |

Harold Marvin Rayner (July 27, 1888 – December 8, 1954) was an American fencer and modern pentathlete. He won a bronze medal in the team foil event at the 1920 Summer Olympics.
