= New Stark, Ohio =

Unincorporated community in Ohio, U.S.

Coordinates: 40°50′02″N 83°44′15″W

New Stark is an unincorporated community in Hancock County, in the U.S. state of Ohio.

== History ==
A post office called New Stark was established in 1886, and remained in operation until 1903. Besides the post office, New Stark had a sawmill and several country stores.
