= Arthur Rothrock =

American sport shooter (1886–1938)

Personal information
- Born: January 7, 1886 New Stark, Ohio, United States
- Died: November 28, 1938 (aged 52) Ada, Ohio, United States

Sport
- Sport: Sports shooting
Medal record
Men's shooting
Representing the United States
Olympic Games
Gold medal – first place	1920 Antwerp	Team small-bore rifle
Silver medal – second place	1920 Antwerp	Small-bore rifle

Captain Arthur Dale Rothrock (January 7, 1886 – November 28, 1938) was an American sport shooter who competed in the 1920 Summer Olympics.

In 1920 he won an Olympic gold medal as a member of the American team in the team small-bore rifle competition and a silver medal in the individual small-bore rifle. He also participated in the 300 metre military rifle, standing event but his place is unknown.

Additionally, he participated in a number of marksmen competitions both in the United States and abroad.

== Personal life ==
Rothrock was born in New Stark, Ohio to George and Anna May (Bowers) Rothrock. At a young age, his family moved to Ada, Ohio. Rothrock graduated from Ada High School in 1901 before attending Ohio Northern University.

Rothrock died in Ada, Ohio, two days before he was set to retire from the US Army. He was buried at the Rock Island National Cemetery.
