= Aileen Riggin =

American diver and swimmer

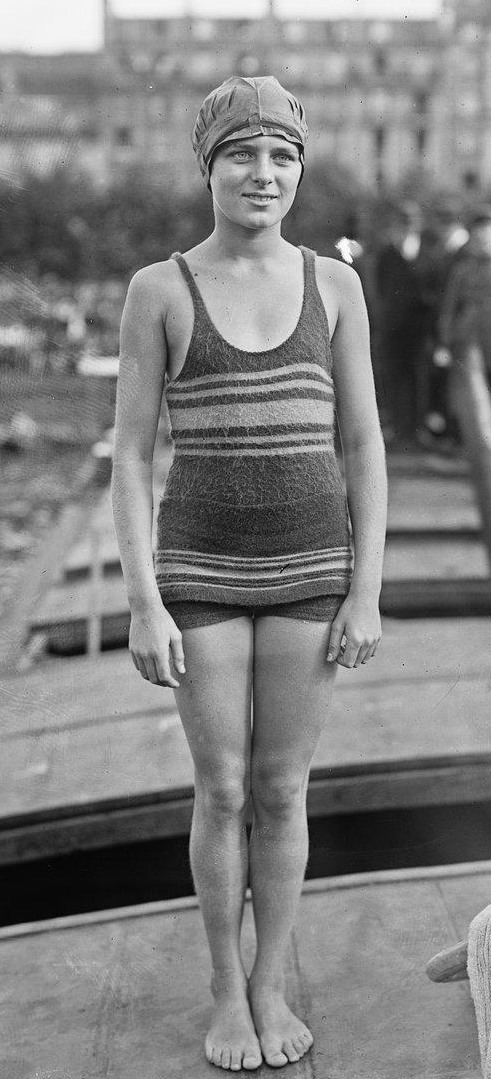
- Riggin in 1920

Personal information
- Full name: Aileen Muriel Riggin
- National team: United States
- Born: May 2, 1906 Newport, Rhode Island, U.S.
- Died: October 17, 2002 (aged 96) Honolulu, Hawaii, U.S.
- Height: 4 ft 8 in (142 cm)
- Weight: 65 lb (29.5 kg)

Sport
- Sport: Swimming, diving
- Club: Women's Swimming Association
Medal record
Representing the United States
Women's diving
Olympic Games
Gold medal – first place	1920 Antwerp	3m springboard
Silver medal – second place	1924 Paris	3m springboard
Women's swimming
Olympic Games
Bronze medal – third place	1924 Paris	100m backstroke

Aileen Muriel Riggin (May 2, 1906 – October 17, 2002), also known by her married name Aileen Soule (also Aileen Riggin Soule), was an American competition swimmer and diver. She was Olympic champion in springboard diving in 1920 and U.S. national springboard diving champion from 1923 to 1925. After retiring from competitions, she enjoyed a long and varied career in acting, coaching, writing and journalism. She was a swimming celebrity in Hawaii and the United States and an active ambassador of women's swimming well into old age.

== Early life ==
Born in Newport, Rhode Island, Riggin learned to swim at the age of six, in Manila Bay in the Philippines where her father, a U.S. Navy paymaster, was stationed.

Her family settled in Brooklyn Heights in New York and at the age of eleven she became a charter member (Note: A charter member of an organization is an original member; that is, one who became a member when the organization first received its charter.) of the celebrated Women's Swimming Association (WSA) of New York, founded by Charlotte Epstein in 1917. Her first WSA swimming coach was Louis de B. Handley of the New York Athletic Club, double gold medalist at St. Louis in 1904.

Riggin first took up diving in 1919 at the age of thirteen; she practiced in a tide pool on Long Island because there were no training facilities provided in those days for female divers. She had spent some time studying ballet at the Metropolitan Opera School of Ballet in New York and her ballet training enabled her to fine-tune her performance in artistic diving.

== Competitive career ==
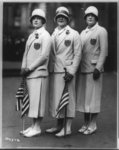
1920 Olympic swimmers Riggin, G. Ederle, and H. Wainwright

Riggin was the first-ever female Olympic diving champion. She was only 14 years and 120 days old when she won a gold medal in the women's 3 metre springboard diving ('fancy diving') event at the 1920 Olympic Games in Antwerp, also making her the youngest female Olympic champion (a record that was surpassed in 1936 by 13-year-old American diver Marjorie Gestring). Not only was she the youngest gold medalist at the 1920 Olympics, she was also the shortest, at only 4 feet 8 inches (1.42 m) and weighing just 65 pounds (29 kg); she went down in history as America's smallest Olympic champion.

Still only eighteen, Riggin competed at the 1924 Olympic Games in Paris in both diving and swimming, winning a silver medal in the 3m springboard diving and a bronze medal in the 100m backstroke swimming event. In doing so she became the first female Olympian to win medals in two different sports at the same Olympic Games; in fact she is widely credited as being the only female competitor ever to do so. (Note: Most references cite Riggin as the only woman to have won medals in two different sports at a single Olympic Games, but the evidence shows that this is not true. At the 1924 Olympics there were two females who achieved this feat: Aileen Riggin and Hjördis Töpel, both of whom won medals in swimming and diving. It is not possible to determine which of the two women was actually the first to do this as their respective events took place on the same dates and there are no records of the exact event schedule times.)

She was a member of the Amateur Athletic Union (AAU), winning three national springboard diving titles (from 1923 to 1925) at the AAU Outdoor Championships; she was also twice in the winning team in the 4×220m freestyle relay (1923 and 1924). At the National AAU Indoor Championships, she won one diving title and three freestyle relay titles (in 1922, 1923 and 1925).

== Professional career ==
Riggin made the first underwater swimming film in 1922 and the first slow motion coaching films for Grantland Rice in 1923. She retired from competitions in 1925 and spent her time helping to organize exhibitions and swimming demonstrations overseas.

She had minor roles in several Hollywood films: she was a dancer in the 1933 musical Roman Scandals and she skated in the first Sonja Henie film One in a Million in 1936. She starred in Billy Rose's first Aquacade at the 1937 Cleveland Exposition, which she also helped to organize.

She wrote books about her experiences in swimming and she became a successful sports journalist, writing newspaper columns for the New York Daily Post, the London Morning Post and others. Her articles were published in national magazines such as Good Housekeeping and Collier's.

== Personal life ==
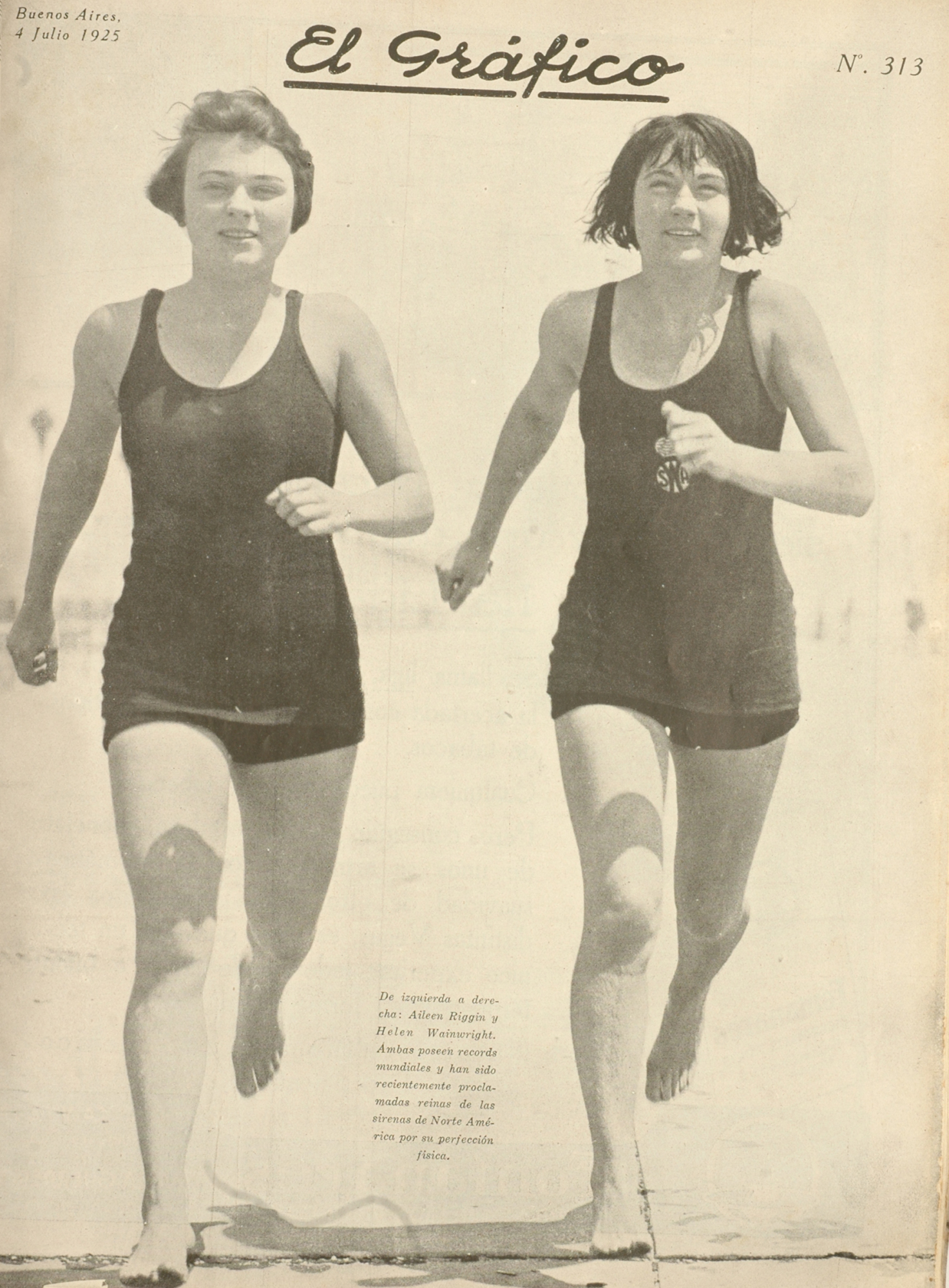
Aileen Riggin (left) with Helen Wainwright in 1925

Her first husband was Dwight D. Young, a navy doctor whom she married in 1924. They had one daughter together named Yvonne May. Young was killed in World War II. Following the death of her first husband, she later married Howard Soule, changing her name to Aileen Soule. She gained a stepdaughter named Patricia Soule Anderson and two stepsons, Bruce Soule and Wallace Soule. At the time of her death, she also had three grandchildren and two great-grandsons.

Aileen Soule moved to Hawaii in 1957 with her second husband, where they lived together for almost twenty-five years; she was widowed for the second time in 1981 and lived alone in Waikiki after her husband's death.

In 1967 she was inducted into the International Swimming Hall of Fame in Fort Lauderdale, Florida. As a result of her fundraising and motivational presentations, she was selected to serve as Grande Dame of the Swimming Hall of Fame in 1988. She was a founder member of the Hawaii Senior Games Association, supporters of the Senior Olympics, and remained a board member into old age.

Soule was one of the most sought after swimming celebrities in Hawaii and the USA. As one of the surviving members of the United States team at the 1920 Antwerp Olympics, she was chosen to escort the Ceremonial Olympic Handover Flag, known as the Antwerp Flag at the opening ceremony of the 1984 Los Angeles Olympics and she was invited to address Team USA at the 1996 Atlanta Olympics as a motivational speaker. She continued to swim into old age and at the age of 85 she broke six world records in freestyle and backstroke sprints in the World Masters for her age group (85–89). Furthermore, by the end of 1996 she held eleven national records and five world records in the next age group (90–94).

At the end of the 20th century, Riggin was the last surviving champion from the 1920 Olympic Games and she was celebrated as the nation's oldest living female Olympic gold medalist.

== Death ==
Aileen (Riggin) Soule died in October 2002 (Note: Date of death is given as Oct 17 in all references apart from one: Karl Lennartz gives date of death as Oct 19.) in a nursing home in Honolulu, Hawaii of natural causes. Following her death, she was remembered by friends and family as a "pioneer of women's sports". In November 2002, she was posthumously inducted into the Hawaii Sports Hall of Fame.

== See also ==
- List of members of the International Swimming Hall of Fame
- List of athletes with Olympic medals in different sports
- List of Olympic medalists in swimming (women)
