= Hoogboom Military Camp =

Military installation in Brasschaat, Belgium

Hoogboom Military Camp was a military installation located in Brasschaat, Belgium, located 10 km northeast of neighboring Antwerp. The venue hosted the Olympic trap and 100 metre running deer shooting events for the 1920 Summer Olympics.
