= Willis Augustus Lee =

United States Navy admiral (1888–1945)

Willis Augustus Lee Jr.
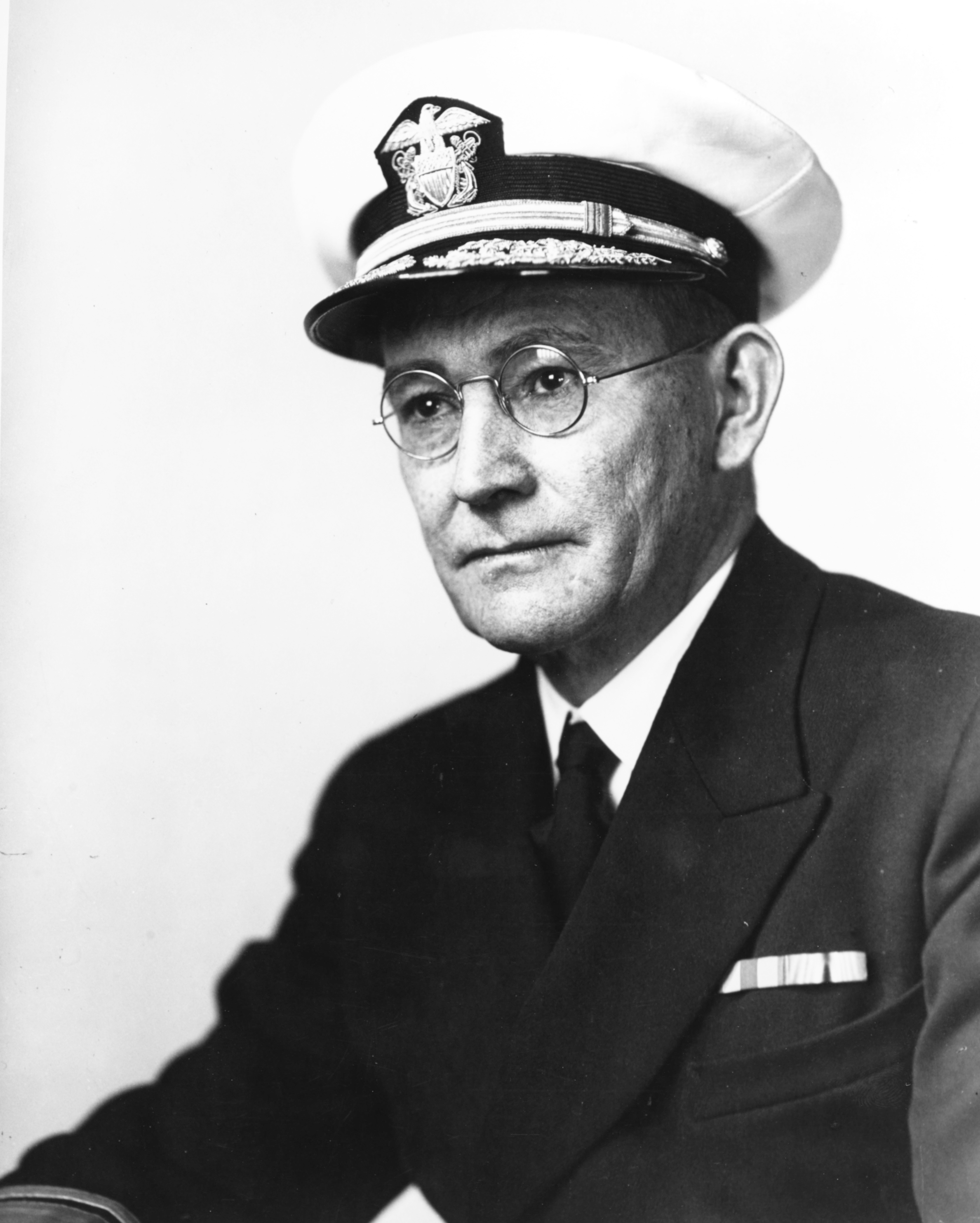
- Rear Admiral Willis A. Lee Jr., circa 1942.
- Born: May 11, 1888; Natlee, Kentucky, U.S.
- Died: August 25, 1945 (aged 57); USS Wyoming (BB-32), off the coast of Maine
- Burial place: Arlington National Cemetery
- Military career
- Allegiance: United States of America
- Branch: United States Navy
- Service years: 1908–1945
- Rank: Vice Admiral
- Nickname: Ching
- Commands: USS Fairfax; USS William B. Preston; USS Lardner; USS Pennsylvania; USS Concord; USS Washington; Battleship Division 6 Battleships Pacific Fleet
- Conflicts: Occupation of Veracruz; World War I; World War II; Naval Battle of Guadalcanal
- Awards: Navy Cross; Distinguished Service Medal (2); Legion of Merit

Willis Augustus "Ching" Lee Jr. (May 11, 1888 – August 25, 1945) was a vice admiral of the United States Navy during World War II. Lee commanded the American ships during the second night of the Naval Battle of Guadalcanal (November 14–15, 1942) and turned back a Japanese invasion force headed for the island. The victory ended Japanese attempts to reinforce their troops on Guadalcanal, and thus marked a turning point in both the Guadalcanal campaign and the Pacific War.

Lee was also a skilled sport shooter who won seven medals in the 1920 Olympics shooting events, including five gold medals, tied with teammate Lloyd Spooner for the most anyone had ever received at a single Olympic Games. Their record stood for 60 years. He was the most successful athlete at the 1920 Olympics.

== Early life ==
The son of Judge Willis Augustus Lee and Susan Arnold, he was known as "Mose" Lee to family and friends.

He entered the U.S. Naval Academy in 1904. While at the Naval Academy, his Chinese-sounding last name, compounded by his fondness for the Far East, earned him the moniker "Ching" Lee. Among his classmates were several future admirals including: Harry A. Badt, Paul H. Bastedo, John R. Beardall, Abel T. Bidwell, Joseph J. Broshek, Arthur S. Carpender, Jules James, Walter K. Kilpatrick, James L. Kauffman, Thomas C. Kinkaid, William R. Munroe, William R. Purnell, Francis W. Rockwell, John F. Shafroth Jr., and Richmond K. Turner.

Following graduation, Lee joined the academy's rifle team three times. First, during his final summer training stint on the USS Nevada he was called back to Annapolis to participate on the rifle team. He was assigned to the battleship Idaho from October 1908 to May 1909, before returning to the naval academy and rejoining the rifle team. From November 1909 until May 1910, Lee served aboard the protected cruiser New Orleans, and then transferred to the gunboat Helena. Upon being detached back to the United States, Lee re-joined the academy shooting team a third time. In July 1913, Lee re-joined Idaho, and in April 1914 he transferred to the battleship New Hampshire to participate in the occupation of Veracruz.

During World War I, Lee served on the destroyers O'Brien and Lea.

== 1920 Olympics ==
Willis Augustus Lee
Medal record

Men's shooting

Representing the United States

Olympic Games
Gold medal – first place	1920 Antwerp	Team 50 m small bore rifle
Gold medal – first place	1920 Antwerp	Team 300 m army rifle, prone
Gold medal – first place	1920 Antwerp	Team 600 m free rifle
Gold medal – first place	1920 Antwerp	Team free rifle, 300 m + 600 m
Gold medal – first place	1920 Antwerp	Team free rifle
Silver medal – second place	1920 Antwerp	Team 300 m army rifle, standing
Bronze medal – third place	1920 Antwerp	Team 100 m running deer, single shots

Lee participated in 14 events at the 1920 Summer Olympics in Antwerp. He won 7 medals (5 gold, 1 silver, and 1 bronze), all in team events. His teammates for the various events were Dennis Fenton, Lawrence Nuesslein, Arthur Rothrock, Oliver Schriver, Morris Fisher, Carl Osburn, Lloyd Spooner, and Joseph Jackson.

Lee and Spooner ended the 1920 Olympics with 7 medals each, the most anyone had ever received in a single year's games. Boris Shakhlin was the next person to reach 7, in 1960. It would not be until Alexander Dityatin in the 1980 games that anyone would beat the record.

== Interwar years ==
Lee attended the Naval War College in the late 1920s, and was promoted to the rank of captain in 1936.

During the 1930s and early 1940s, Lee was several times assigned to the Fleet Training Division, commanded the light cruiser Concord, and served on the staff of Commander, Cruisers, Battle Force. In early 1942, following his promotion to the rank of rear admiral, Lee became Assistant Chief of Staff to the Commander in Chief of U.S. Fleet.

== World War II ==
Lee's specialty in life was gunnery. At the age of 19 in 1907 "he became the only American to win both the US National High Power Rifle and Pistol championships in the same year." In 1914 during the Veracruz campaign in Mexico he drew the fire of three enemy snipers, thereby exposing their positions and then shot them at long range. He understood the powerful guns of a battleship as an extension of the law of ballistics and adapted his expertise to the new age of technology. When Admiral Lee engaged the Japanese Vice Admiral Nobutake Kondō's battleship Kirishima on the evening of November 14, 1942, in the waters off Guadalcanal, he became naval history's first battleship commander to conduct a "gunfight" primarily by radar remote control.

=== Naval Battle of Guadalcanal ===
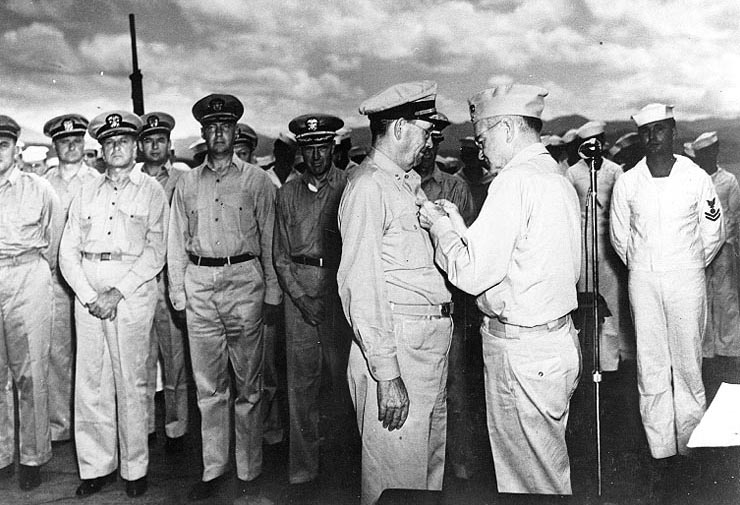
Bull Halsey presents Lee with the Navy Cross for his actions during the Naval Battle of Guadalcanal, circa January 1943

In August 1942, Rear Admiral Lee was sent to the Pacific to command Battleship Division Six, consisting of the battleships Washington and South Dakota. Flying his flag in Washington, Lee engaged an Imperial Japanese Navy surface fleet under the command of Vice Admiral Kondō during the second night of the Naval Battle of Guadalcanal on the night of November 14–15, 1942. While riding in the battleship Washington, which served as his flagship during this sea fight, Lee's battleship shelled the Japanese battleship Kirishima into a battered wreck. She capsized and sank a few hours afterward as the Japanese were abandoning ship. She went down in Ironbottom Sound with 212 Imperial Japanese Navy sailors still aboard, leaving Admiral Lee's flagship Washington the only American battleship during World War II to sink an enemy battleship in a "one on one" gunfight.

Lee, who "knew more about radar than the radar operators," used the SG radar installed aboard Washington to skillfully maneuver his ships during the night.

To Willis Lee went many accolades. "Audacious planning and execution" marked his operations, commented Halsey... Unlike Callaghan, Lee never allowed the action to degenerate into a nautical brawl, because he formulated a workable plan and adhered to it, even after every ship in his task force except Washington was sunk or forced to retire. Lee was never more incisive than in his own evaluation of his success: "We realized then and it should not be forgotten now, that our entire superiority was due almost entirely to our possession of radar. Certainly we have no edge on the Japs in experience, skill, training, or performance of personnel."

— Richard B. Frank

=== After Guadalcanal ===
Lee was awarded the Navy Cross for his actions at the battle, promoted to vice admiral in 1944 and placed in charge of the Pacific Fleet's fast battleships, as Commander, Battleships, Pacific Fleet (ComBatPac).

In May 1945, he was sent to the Atlantic to command a special unit researching defenses against the threat of Japanese kamikaze aircraft, the Composite Task Force, U.S. Atlantic Fleet. While serving in that position on August 25, 1945, Vice Admiral Lee died suddenly after suffering a heart attack, ten days after the surrender of Japan. He collapsed and died in a motor launch that was ferrying him out to his flagship, the gunnery training ship USS Wyoming (AG-17), in the harbor of Portland, Maine. Lee was buried in Arlington National Cemetery.

== Family ==
Willis Lee Jr. was a distant relative of Confederate General Robert E. Lee and the third Attorney General of the United States, Charles Lee. He married Mabelle Allen Elspeth (1894–1949) on July 14, 1919. They had no children. Willis' father, Judge Willis Augustus Lee Sr., was one of fourteen children of Nathaniel Wiley Lee (aka Nat Lee, founder of Natlee, Kentucky) and Frances Abbott, of Owen County, Kentucky. While in the Pacific theater, Lee unofficially adopted two Korean children in Vietnam after the children's family requested that Lee take the children to the United States.

His great-grandparents were early Kentucky settlers, Joseph R. Lee and Mary Wiley. His grandfather Nathaniel W. Lee operated a distillery at his namesake village of Natlee. In 1893, Nat Lee's sour mash whiskey was taken to the Chicago World's Fair where it won the Gold Medal over 5000 other entries.

== Namesakes ==
The Mitscher-class destroyer USS Willis A. Lee (DD-929), redesignated before commissioning as a destroyer leader (DL-4), was named for him.

== Awards and decorations ==
Below is the ribbon bar of Vice Admiral Willis Augustus Lee:

1st Row	Navy Cross		Navy Distinguished Service Medal with one 5/16" Gold Star
2nd Row	Legion of Merit	Mexican Service Medal	World War I Victory Medal with "Destroyer" Clasp
3rd Row	American Defense Service Medal	American Campaign Medal	Asiatic-Pacific Campaign Medal with five 3/16 inch battle stars
4th Row	World War II Victory Medal	Grand Cordon of the Order of the Cloud and Banner (Nationalist China)	Philippine Liberation Medal with two stars (Republic of the Philippines)

== See also ==
- List of multiple Olympic gold medalists
