= Frederick Mason (wrestler) =

British wrestler

- Born: 1 March 1889
- Died: 14 February 1961 (aged 71)

Frederick Mason (1 March 1889 – 14 February 1961) was a British wrestler. He competed in the freestyle heavyweight event at the 1920 Summer Olympics.
