= Joseph Lawless (sport shooter) =

American sports shooter

Personal information
- Born: March 23, 1890 Waltham, Massachusetts, United States
- Died: February 18, 1923 (aged 32)

Sport
- Sport: Sports shooting

Joseph Thomas Lawless (March 23, 1890 – February 18, 1923) was an American sports shooter. He competed in the 600m military rifle event at the 1920 Summer Olympics.
