= Elmer Lindroth =

American sports shooter

Personal information
- Born: August 23, 1887 Rockford, Illinois, United States
- Died: September 9, 1942 (aged 55) Washington, District of Columbia, United States

Sport
- Sport: Sports shooting

Elmer G. Lindroth (August 23, 1887 – September 9, 1942) was an American sports shooter. He competed in the 600m military rifle event at the 1920 Summer Olympics.
