= Robert Roth (sport wrestler) =

Swiss wrestler (1898–1959)

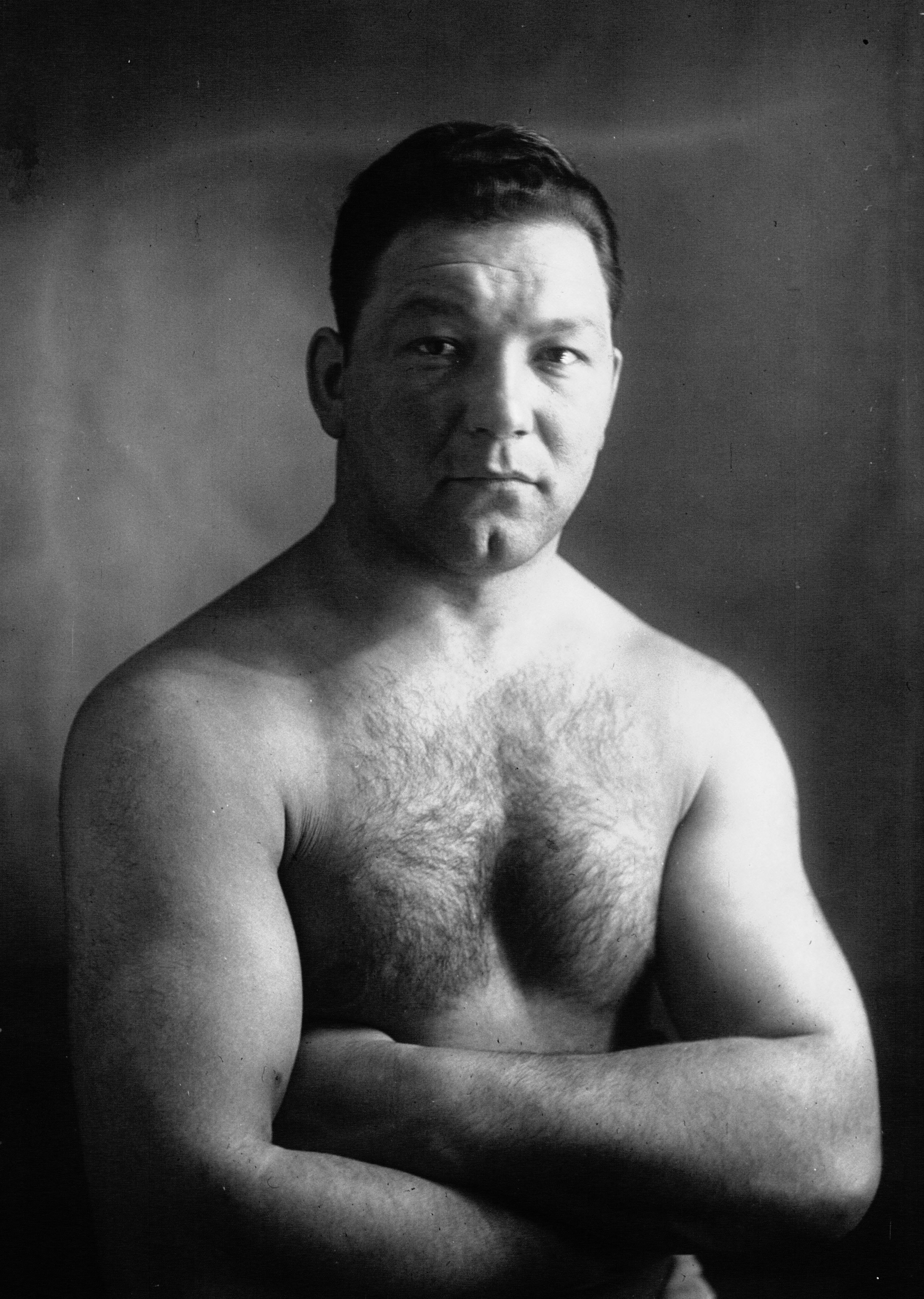
- Robert Roth in 1922

Personal information
- Born: 5 July 1898 Bern, Switzerland
- Died: 17 November 1959 (aged 61) Nidau, Switzerland
Medal record
Men's freestyle wrestling
Representing Switzerland
Olympic Games
Gold medal – first place	1920 Antwerp	Heavyweight

Robert Roth (5 July 1898 – 17 November 1959) was a Swiss wrestler who won a gold medal in the freestyle heavyweight class at the 1920 Summer Olympics. Roth was a national champion in schwingen, Swiss national wrestling, in 1919 and 1921. Between 1922 and 1927, he competed as a professional, then returned to amateur status and won the national title in 1928 and 1931. His younger brothers Hans and Fritz were also Olympic wrestlers.
