= Thomas Brown (sport shooter) =

American sport shooter (1885–1950)

Personal information
- Born: February 2, 1885 Halleck, West Virginia, United States
- Died: November 4, 1950 (aged 65) Rawlins, Wyoming, United States

Sport
- Sport: Sports shooting
Medal record
Men's shooting
Representing United States
Olympic Games
Silver medal – second place	1920 Antwerp	team 300 m military rifle, standing
Bronze medal – third place	1920 Antwerp	team running deer, single shots

Thomas Granville Brown (February 2, 1885 – November 4, 1950) was an American sport shooter who competed in the 1920 Summer Olympics.

In 1920, he won the silver medal as a member of the American squad in the team 300 metre military rifle, standing competition, and the bronze medal in the team running deer, single shots event. In the 1920 Summer Olympics he also participated in the following events:

- Team running deer, double shots - fourth place
- running deer, double shots - place unknown
- running deer, single shots - place unknown

He was born in Halleck, West Virginia and died in Rawlins, Wyoming.
