= Fred Meyer (wrestler) =

American wrestler (1900–1983)

Personal information
- Full name: Frederick Julius Meyer
- Born: May 17, 1900 Chicago, Illinois, U.S.
- Died: March 12, 1983 (aged 82) Los Angeles, California, U.S.

Sport
- Country: United States
- Sport: Wrestling
- Event: Freestyle
- Club: Chicago Hebrew Institute
- Team: USA
Medal record
Men's freestyle wrestling
Representing the United States
Olympic Games
Bronze medal – third place	1920 Antwerp	Heavyweight

Frederick Julius Meyer (May 17, 1900 – March 12, 1983) was an American wrestler who competed in the 1920 Summer Olympics winning a bronze medal and later had a successful professional wrestling career. Meyer, who was Jewish was born in Chicago and died in Los Angeles. He attended DePaul University.

== 1920 Olympic bronze medal ==
In 1920, he won the Olympic bronze medal in the freestyle wrestling heavyweight class in Antwerp. In the competition, he tied for third with Ernst Nilsson of Sweden. In the wrestle-off for the bronze medals, they wrestled two 15-minute bouts before the match was called a draw and two bronze medals were awarded.

Meyer had an excellent record in American competition. He won six Central AAU and four National AAU titles. He won both the 191 lb. and heavyweight divisions at the 1922 National Championships. He later became very successful as a professional wrestler.

As part of a trend in which religious and ethnic organizations used their facilities to develop competitive athletes, Meyer was one of a number of national champions whose skills were fostered at the Chicago Hebrew Institute. Meyer, who had been wrestling for the Chicago Hebrew Institute since he was nine years old, joined Walter Mauer of the Institute at the 1920 Summer Games in Antwerp, Belgium, marking the first time that Jewish athletes representing a Jewish club had been selected for the U.S. team. Dr. George Eisen of Nazareth College included Meyer on his list of Jewish Olympic Medalists.

Meyer died on March 12, 1983, of heart failure at Century City Hospital in Los Angeles.

== See also ==
- List of select Jewish wrestlers
