= Helen Wainwright =

American swimmer and diver

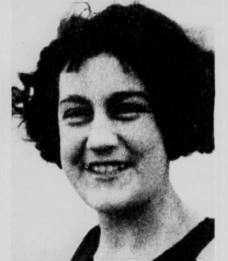
- Wainwright in 1922

Personal information
- Full name: Helen E. Wainwright
- National team: United States
- Born: March 15, 1906 New York City, New York, U.S.
- Died: October 8, 1965 (aged 59) Hampton Bays, New York, U.S.
- Height: 5 ft 1 in (155 cm)
- Spouse: Howard Cree Stelling

Sport
- Sport: Swimming
- Strokes: Freestyle, springboard diving
- Club: Women's Swimming Association (WSA)
- Coach: Louis de B. Handley, (WSA)
Medal record
Representing the United States
Olympic Games
Women's diving
Silver medal – second place	1920 Antwerp	3 m springboard
Women's swimming
Silver medal – second place	1924 Paris	400 m freestyle

Helen E. Wainwright (March 15, 1906 – October 8, 1965), also known by her married name Helen Stelling, was a competition diver and swimmer for the Women's Swimming Association of New York, who represented the United States at the 1920 Summer Olympics in Antwerp, where she won a silver medal in 3-meter springboard diving and in the 1924 Summer Olympics in Paris, where she won a silver medal in the 400-meter freestyle. She remains the only woman to ever win Olympic silver medals in both swimming and diving.

== Early life ==
Helen Wainwright was born on March 15, 1906, the daughter of John Wainwright, a bricklayer from Lancaster, England, who emigrated to New York in 1888.

=== Women's Swimming Association ===
She was a member of the Women's Swimming Association (WSA) of New York a progressive organization founded by Charlotte Epstein in 1914. The organization was one of the first to advocate for women's membership in the AAU, women's participation in distance rather than just sprint events, and increasing and facilitating women's participation in the Olympics. Her WSA swimming coach Louis de B. Handley, a former Olympic Gold medalist, called Wainwright the world's fastest swimmer. She won 19 gold medals in U.S. national championships, 17 of them for swimming and the other two for diving events.

== 1920, 24 Olympic medals ==
At the 1920 Olympics in Antwerp, aged just 14 years old, Wainwright won the silver medal in the women's 3-meter springboard competition.

Four years later, at the 1924 Olympics in Paris, she won the silver medal with a time of 6:03.8 in the women's 400-meter freestyle event. Although Gertrude Ederle would have been the favorite for the event, she had a poor Olympics. The American women swept the finals, with Martha Norelius winning the gold, and Trudy Ederle taking the bronze.

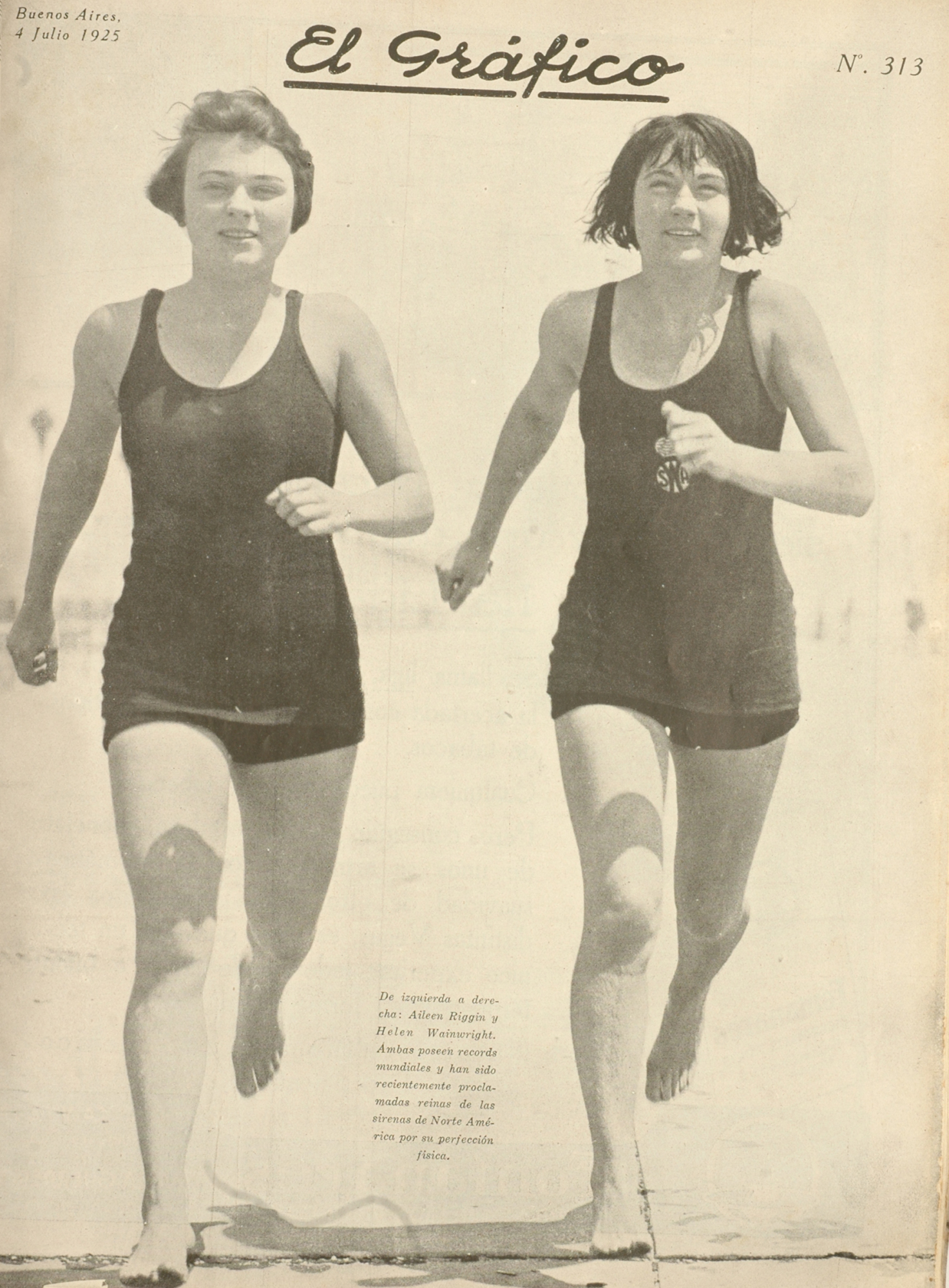
Aileen Riggin (l), with Wainwright (r), 1925

Demonstrating sustained dominance in distance freestyle, on August 19, 1922, Wainwright set a world record in the women's 1500 metres freestyle swimming event, a distance of around 1 mile, which stood for over three years.

During her exceptional swimming career, she held the world record at various times in the 50, 220, 440, and 880 yard freestyle events. With standard short course pool sizes having changed from 20 to 25 yards or meters since Wainwright's career, swimming events are all now multiples of 25 yards or meters in distance. She was national diving champion for the three years from 1923-1925.

== Post Olympic career ==
Shortly after the 1924 Olympics, she performed in swimming-and-diving shows at the New York Hippodrome along with fellow U.S. Olympians and WSA colleagues Aileen Riggin and Gertrude Ederle. They later toured round some of the biggest theaters in the U.S. using a portable water tank.

Wainwright very nearly became the first woman to swim the English Channel in 1925; she was selected by the WSA to make the attempt but was forced to pull out due to an injury to her leg caused while stepping off a New York trolley, so her teammate Gertrude Ederle was chosen to take her place.

While headlining a 1927 vaudeville performance in Dallas, Texas, though engaged to Ben Owen, she briefly married George Leonard Holland, an accompanying organist, Long Island resident and former athlete at the University of Pennsylvania. Wainwright never subsequently claimed the marriage was more than a spontaneous whim. She soon obtained an annulment with the permission of Holland. In the 1930s, she became a swimming coach on cruise liners out of New York.

=== Wedding ===
At 26, she married a career military man, Lt. Howard Cree Stelling of the 22nd Observation Squadron on February 1, 1933, in Shreveport, Caddo, Louisiana, United States, three miles from Bossier City. Stelling would later attain the rank of Colonel. The wedding coincided with the dedication of the newly established Barksdale Field, a new U.S. Army Air Corps Aviation Center in Bossier City, nearly adjacent to Shreveport. At the time, the U.S. Air Force had not been established as a military branch separate from the U.S. Army. A variety of high-ranking military personnel, including the Secretary and Assistant Secretary of War, and a Chief of the Army Air Corps, attended the dedication of the new base. Stelling of Augusta, Ga., who had earlier played football for the University of Georgia, was than an aviator stationed in Brooksfield, Texas. The couple met in 1928 in Chattanooga, Tennessee.

She died at her home in Hampton Bays, Long Island at the age of 59 on Friday, October 8, 1965 after a long illness. A private graveside service was held for her on October 11 at Long Island National Cemetery, Farmingdale.

=== Honors ===
Wainwright was inducted into the International Swimming Hall of Fame in 1972.

== See also ==
- List of members of the International Swimming Hall of Fame
- List of athletes with Olympic medals in different disciplines
- List of Olympic medalists in swimming (women)
- World record progression 1500 metres freestyle

Records
Preceded by Incumbent	Women's 1,500-meter freestyle world record-holder (long course); August 19, 1922 – December 31, 1925	Succeeded by Ethel McGary
