= Sven Mattsson =

Finnish wrestler

- Born: 5 May 1889; Turku, Finland
- Died: 16 January 1967 (aged 77); Helsinki, Finland

Sven Aleksander Mattsson (5 May 1889 – 16 January 1967) was a Finnish wrestler. He competed in the freestyle heavyweight event at the 1920 Summer Olympics.
