= Moose Goheen =

American ice hockey player (1894–1979)

- Hockey Hall of Fame, 1952
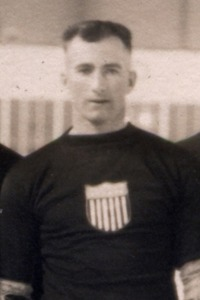
- Moose Goheen representing USA at the 1920 Summer Olympics.
- Born: February 8, 1894 White Bear Lake, Minnesota, U.S.
- Died: November 13, 1979 (aged 85) Maplewood, Minnesota, U.S.
- Height: 6 ft 0 in (183 cm)
- Weight: 220 lb (100 kg; 15 st 10 lb)
- Position: Left wing / Defence
- Shot: Left
- Played for: Buffalo Majors; St. Paul Saints; White Bear Lakers; St. Paul Athletic Club
- National team: United States
- Playing career: 1914–1933
Medal record
Olympic Games
Silver medal – second place	1920 Antwerp	Team

Francis Xavier "Moose" Goheen (February 8, 1894 – November 13, 1979) was an American amateur ice hockey forward. While enrolled at the Valparaiso University, Goheen was a skilled, three-sport athlete competing in football and baseball, in addition to hockey. Goheen was a member of the St. Paul Athletic Club team that won United States Amateur Hockey championship and received the MacNaughton Cup in the 1915–16 season. After that season, Goheen enlisted in the United States Army and served in the European theatre during World War I in the Army's signal corps. After his service in the Army, Goheen returned to the St. Paul Athletic Club and won a second league championship and MacNaughton Cup in 1920. Goheen also competed in the 1920 Summer Olympics as the captain and rover for the American ice hockey team, which won the silver medal. Outside of hockey, Goheen was dedicated to his career with the Northern States Power Company in St. Paul, so much so that he declined to play with United States Olympic hockey team in the 1924 Winter Olympics and spurned multiple contract offers to play in the National Hockey League with the Boston Bruins (in 1926) and Toronto Maple Leafs.

In 1952, Moose Goheen was inducted to the Hockey Hall of Fame; at the time, he was only the second American to have been inducted (after Hobey Baker) and the first Minnesotan. He was also elected to the Minnesota Sports Hall of Fame in 1958 and to the United States Hockey Hall of Fame in 1973. In 1924, in a 1–0 victory over Boston for the St. Paul Saints, Goheen scored a goal using a slap shot—the earliest record of the feat.

The White Bear Lake Area Hockey Association holds yearly tournaments in Goheen's name.

== Career statistics ==
=== International ===
Year	Team	Event	GP	G	A	Pts	PIM
1920	USA	OLY	4	7	0	7	—
Senior totals			4	7	0	7	—

=== Regular season and playoffs ===
			Regular season					Playoffs
Season	Team	League	GP	G	A	Pts	PIM	GP	G	A	Pts	PIM
1922–23	St. Paul Saints	USAHA	20	11	0	11	—	4	3	0	3	—
1923–24	St. Paul Saints	USAHA	20	10	4	14	—	8	3	1	4	—
1924–25	St. Paul Saints	USAHA	32	6	0	6	—	—	—	—	—	—
1925–26	St. Paul Saints	CHL	36	13	10	23	87	—	—	—	—	—
1926–27	St. Paul Saints	AHA	27	2	7	9	40	—	—	—	—	—
1927–28	St. Paul Saints	AHA	39	19	5	24	96	—	—	—	—	—
1928–29	St. Paul Saints	AHA	28	7	4	11	39	8	2	0	2	20
1929–30	St. Paul Saints	AHA	35	9	6	15	47	—	—	—	—	—
1930–31	Buffalo Majors	AHA	2	0	0	0	0	—	—	—	—	—
1931–32	St. Paul Saints	CHL	20	2	7	9	17	—	—	—	—	—
AHA totals			131	37	22	59	222	8	2	0	2	20
USAHA totals			72	27	4	31	—	12	4	3	7	—
