= Carl Osburn =

American sport shooter

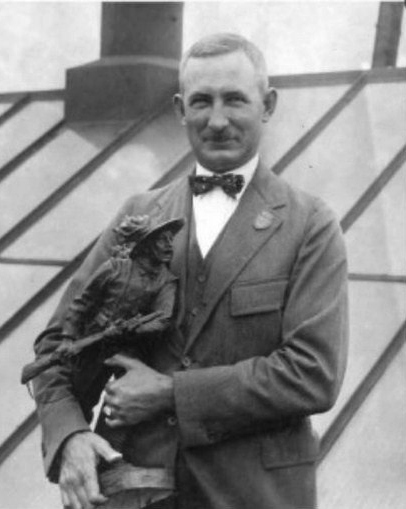

Personal information
- Born: November 5, 1884 Jacksontown, Ohio, U.S.
- Died: December 28, 1966 (aged 82) St. Helena, California, U.S.
- Height: 1.80 m (5 ft 11 in)

Sport
- Sport: Sport shooting
Medal record
Representing the United States
Olympic Games
Gold medal – first place	1912 Stockholm	Team rifle
Gold medal – first place	1920 Antwerp	300 m military rifle, standing
Gold medal – first place	1920 Antwerp	300 m team military rifle, prone
Gold medal – first place	1920 Antwerp	300 + 600 m team military rifle, prone
Gold medal – first place	1920 Antwerp	Team free rifle
Silver medal – second place	1912 Stockholm	600 m free rifle
Silver medal – second place	1912 Stockholm	300 m military rifle, three positions
Silver medal – second place	1920 Antwerp	300 m team military rifle, standing
Silver medal – second place	1924 Paris	600 m free rifle
Bronze medal – third place	1912 Stockholm	50 m team small-bore rifle
Bronze medal – third place	1920 Antwerp	100 m team running deer, single shots

Carl Townsend Osburn (May 5, 1884 – December 28, 1966) was a United States Navy officer and sport shooter from Jacksontown, Ohio. After graduating from the United States Naval Academy in 1906, Osburn went on to reach the rank of commander. He competed in the 1912 Summer Olympics, 1920 Summer Olympics, and 1924 Summer Olympics, winning a total of eleven Olympic medals: five gold (including two individual golds), four silver, and two bronze. He is the most successful shooter at the Olympic Games when individual and team medals are both taken into the account. His tally of eleven medals made him the leading male medal winner for the United States at the Olympic Games until Michael Phelps broke this record after Mark Spitz equaled it in 1972.

== Military history ==
Osburn was admitted to the U.S. Naval Academy as a midshipman on August 1, 1903, graduating in 1906, earlier than scheduled, to address a shortage of naval officers. He was assigned for his sea service as a midshipman on board USS Rhode Island (BB-17) from October 12, 1906, to June 1908. He was then assigned to USS Castine (PG-6), a gunboat serving as a submarine tender, from October 4, 1908, to May 1909, seeing service along the Atlantic coast.

During operations off Cuba in 1908, he earned the right to wear the Cuban Pacification Medal. Osburn was commissioned an ensign on February 12, 1909. Additionally, in 1909. Continuing his sea duty, Osburn was assigned on October 2, 1909, to USS Mississippi (BB-23), seeing service off the coast of New England until January 1910.

Promoted to lieutenant (j. g.) on February 12, 1912, Osburn was detailed in April from Mississippi to participate from June to July in the 1912 Olympic Games in Stockholm, Sweden, where he competed in rifle marksmanship.

Osburn then embarked on another tour of duty at sea, this time in USS Des Moines (C-15), a cruiser, beginning on September 12, 1912, and lasting until June 1913. From September 22, 1913, until April 1915, Osburn saw shore duty at the U.S. Naval Academy, and then on May 13, 1915, returned to sea duty on board the presidential yacht USS Mayflower (PY-1), being promoted to lieutenant on July 29, 1915. He received promotion to the permanent rank of lieutenant commander on July 1, 1919. Osburn took command of USS Schenck (DD-159), a recently commissioned destroyer of wartime construction, and conducted patrols in the Caribbean until September 1921, when he was assigned to USS Relief (AH-1).

On December 18, 1922, Osburn was assigned as the naval inspector of ordnance at the Bausch & Lomb Optical Company in Rochester, New York, remaining there until March 1925. On April 14, 1925, Osburn took command of the newly re-commissioned USS Dallas (DD-199), which lasted until June 1927.

Returning to shore duty on January 20, 1932, with the Bureau of Navigation, Osburn was promoted to captain on October 1, 1933. He returned to sea on July 27, 1934, in command of USS Henderson (AP-1), a billet he held until June 1936. On June 30, 1936, Osburn returned to shore duty with the 12th Naval District in San Francisco.

In 1937 he was made the Director, Naval Reserves, for the 12th Naval District. Osburn retired with the rank of captain in 1939 but was recalled to active duty in 1941 to serve as the war plans officer of the 12th Naval District, San Francisco until 1945.

== Personal life ==
After the Second World War, Osburn settled with his wife, Mary, at St. Helena, in the Napa Valley, California, where he died on December 28, 1966.

Osburn's widow donated his collection of medals, trophies and memorabilia to the Naval Historical Foundation in 1967. These artifacts are now in the custody of the Naval History and Heritage Command's Curatorial Management Branch.

Osburn was inducted into the USA Shooting Hall of Fame in 1994, where he is listed as one of the country's nine greatest marksmen.

== See also ==
- List of multiple Olympic gold medalists
- List of multiple Olympic gold medalists at a single Games
- List of multiple Summer Olympic medalists

Records
Preceded by (United States) Ray Ewry	Most career Olympic medals 1920–1928	Succeeded by (Finland) Paavo Nurmi
Preceded by (United States) Ray Ewry	Most career Olympic medals by an American; 1920–2004	Succeeded by (United States) Jenny Thompson
Preceded by (United States) Ray Ewry	Most career Olympic medals by an American man 1920–2008	Succeeded by (United States) Michael Phelps
