= Brooks Parker =

American fencer (1889–1951)

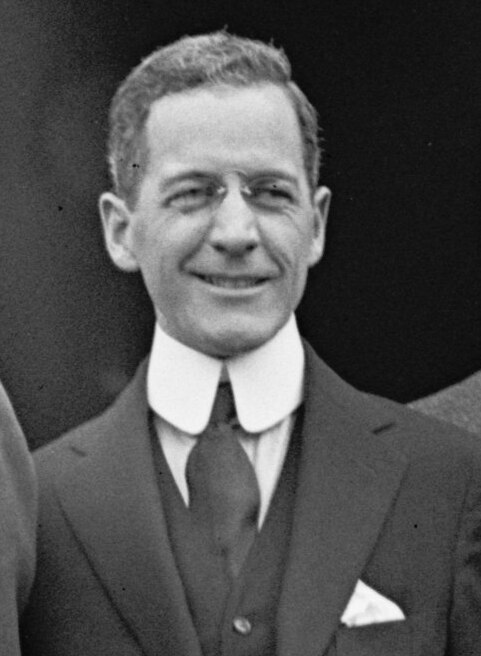
- Parker in 1921

Personal information
- Full name: Joseph Brooks Bloodgood Parker
- Born: December 25, 1889 Philadelphia, Pennsylvania, United States
- Died: November 30, 1951 (aged 61) Bryn Mawr, Pennsylvania, United States

Sport
- Country: USA
- Sport: Fencing
- Events: Foil and saber
- College team: University of Pennsylvania Quakers
- Club: Fencers Club

Joseph Brooks Bloodgood Parker (December 25, 1889 – November 30, 1951) was an American foil and sabre fencer. He competed at the 1920 and 1924 Summer Olympics. In World War I he served as an officer in U.S. Army aviation.
