= Lawrence Nuesslein =

American sport shooter (1895–1971)

Personal information
- Full name: Lawrence Adam Nuesslein I
- Nickname: Larry
- Born: May 16, 1895 Ridgefield Park, New Jersey, U.S.
- Died: May 10, 1971 (aged 75) Allentown, Pennsylvania, U.S.

Sport
- Sport: Sport shooting
Medal record
Men's shooting
Representing the United States
Olympic Games
Gold medal – first place	1920 Antwerp	Small-bore rifle
Gold medal – first place	1920 Antwerp	Team small-bore rifle
Silver medal – second place	1920 Antwerp	Team military rifle, standing
Bronze medal – third place	1920 Antwerp	Military rifle, standing
Bronze medal – third place	1920 Antwerp	Team running deer, single shots

Lawrence Adam Nuesslein (May 16, 1895 – May 10, 1971) was an American sport shooter who competed in the 1920 Summer Olympics. He won a total of five Olympic medals: two gold, one silver, and two bronze.

== Personal life ==
Nuesslein was born in Ridgefield Park, New Jersey, and died in Allentown, Pennsylvania.

== Legacy ==
Nuesslein has been inducted into the USA Shooting Hall of fame.
