= Athletics in India =

- Governing body: Athletics Federation of India

International competitions
- Olympic Games (gold) x1 (silver) x3 Paralympic Games (gold) x8 (silver) x16 (bronze) x13 World Championships (gold) x1 (silver) x1 (bronze) x1 Asian Championships (gold) x94 (silver) x120 (bronze) x140 Asian Games (gold) x85 (silver) x102 (bronze) x96 Commonwealth Games (gold) x6 (silver) x14 (bronze) x16

In India, the Athletics was introduced during the period of the British Raj. The sport is governed by the Athletics Federation of India, which was formed in 1946.

Despite the country's population, only a few Indian athletes used to win medals at global championships. This began to slowly change in the 21st century, when the citizens started taking a little more interest in athletics. The improvement in sport facilities was also another reason for its growth. India has been among the most successful Asian nations, only behind China and Japan.

At the national level, there are three major athletics competitions: the annual Indian National Open Athletics Championships and Indian Inter State Senior Athletics Championships (both first held in 1961), and the quadrennial National Games of India (first held in 1924). An Indian National Championships event predated the Open and Inter State ones, being held from 1924 until 1961. An Indian Marathon Championships was first contested in 1938, while the Indian Cross Country Championships celebrated its 50th edition in 2015. An Indian Racewalking Championships was established in 2014. In addition to the main senior championships there are championships for under-20 and under-18 athletes at national and sub-national levels, as well as senior, non-championship competitions in the form of the Athletics Federation Cup and Indian Athletics Grand Prix tour.

== History ==
=== 20th century ===
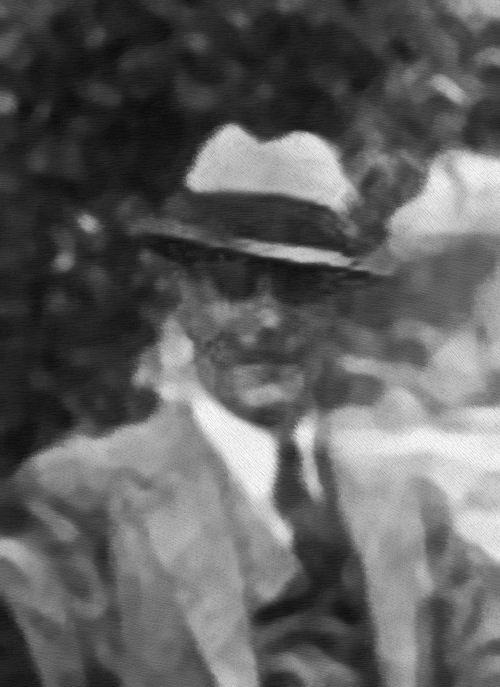
Norman Pritchard – India's first Olympic athletics medallist

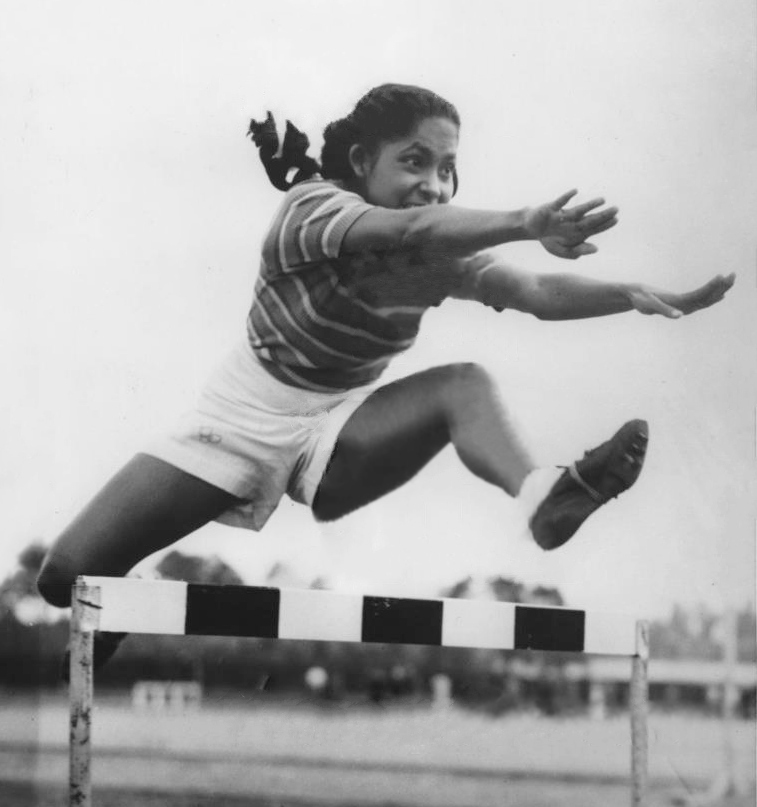
Nilima Ghose was among the first Indian female Olympians

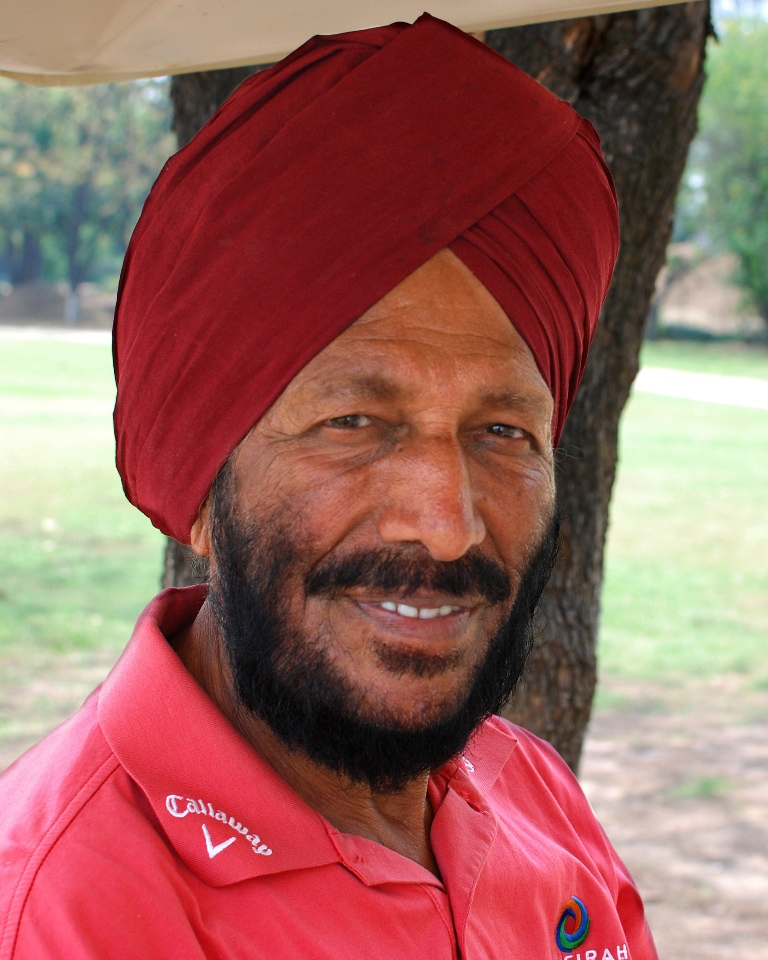
Milkha Singh – known as "The Flying Sikh"

At the Olympic Games, the first Indian competitor was Norman Pritchard, an Anglo-Indian, who won silver medals in the 200 metres and 200 metres hurdles at the 1900 Summer Olympics. These remain the only athletics medals for 120 years until Neeraj Chopra won gold medal in Javelin throw at 2020 Tokyo Olympics. Neeraj created the history by throwing his Javelin to 87.58 meters in the final at Tokyo. He became first track and field athlete of India, who won gold medal at Olympics.

The first indigenous Indians to compete at the games were sprinter Purma Bannerjee, and distance runners Phadeppa Chaugule and Sadashir Datar at the 1920 Antwerp Olympics. The nation continued to send athletes to the Olympic athletics competition every four years, with Nilima Ghose and Mary D'Souza Sequeira becoming independent India's first female Olympians at the 1952 Helsinki Games.

At a regional level, India took part in the 1930 Far Eastern Championship Games, but failed to win any medals. The nation hosted the Western Asiatic Games and won all but three of the athletics events. India was the host of the debut Asian Games in 1951 and finished second to Japan in the athletics medal table, which included a men's sprint double by Lavy Pinto and two silvers in women's sprints by Roshan Mistry. The country was less successful at the 1954 Asian Games, though Parduman Singh Brar managed a shot put/javelin double and Christine Brown, Stephie D'Souza, Violet Peters, Mary D'Souza Sequeira gave India its first women athletics gold medal, taking the 4 × 100 metres relay title.

Milkha Singh was India's first athlete to gain success at a global level, earning the nickname "The Flying Sikh". He won a 200 metres/400 metres double at the 1958 Asian Games before going on to take the 440 yards title at the British Empire and Commonwealth Games – India's first winner at that competition. He finished fourth in the 400 m at the 1960 Summer Olympics. Decathlete Gurbachan Singh Randhawa won gold at the 1962 Asian Games and placed fifth in the 110 metres hurdles final at the 1964 Olympic Games. Throws athlete Praveen Kumar was the sole Indian athletics medallist at the 1966 British Empire and Commonwealth Games and won back-to-back Asian Games discus titles from 1966 to 1970 (achievements that he converted into a film career).

In the 1970s, Indian athletes had increased regional success. Kamaljeet Sandhu became the first Indian female athlete to win an individual Asian Games gold medal, taking the 1970 title in the 400 metres. Decathlete Vijay Singh Chauhan winning the Asian Athletics Championships and Asian Games titles in 1973 and 1974. Men's triple jumper Mohinder Singh Gill won at the 1970 Asian Games, took the first two decathlon titles of the Asian Athletics Championships (1973 and 1975), as well as taking two minor medals at the Commonwealth Games. Sriram Singh established India in middle-distance running, winning two Asian Games golds and a silver that decade, three gold medals at the 1975 Asian Athletics Championships, and a seventh-place finish 1976 Olympic 800 m final. Shivnath Singh won four distance medals at the Asian Championships, placed 11th at the 1976 Olympic Marathon and set a long-standing national marathon record in 1978. In the second half of the decade, Hari Chand (long-distance), Bahadur Singh Chouhan (shot put), Hakam Singh (racewalking) and Suresh Babu (multi-events) each won multiple Asian medals and titles.

The Jawaharlal Nehru Stadium was constructed as the national stadium in preparation for hosting the 1982 Asian Games, representing an improvement in India's elite level sports infrastructure. India was third in the athletics rankings at the competition, behind the regional leaders China and Japan. Chand Ram (racewalking), Bahadur Singh Chouhan, and M. D. Valsamma (hurdles) all won gold with games record performances. The competition marked an era of increased success for India's women athletes: Geeta Zutshi took two silver medals in middle-distance running and 18-year-old P. T. Usha won her first major medals with two silvers in the sprints. Usha reached the final of Women's 400 metres hurdles at 1984 Summer Olympics, setting an Asian record time in fourth place, and also helped the Indian women's 4 × 400 metres relay to the final. Usha went on to win four gold medals at the 1986 Asian Games and an unprecedented four individual titles at the 1985 Asian Athletics Championships. She was the nation's leading athlete at the 1989 Asian Athletics Championships, held in New Delhi, winning four gold medals and one silver. Usha continued to win medals at continental level into the late 1990s.

Usha won three of India's six athletics medals at the 1990 Asian Games, but the emergence of Qatar and South Korea saw India fall down the country rankings. Women's runner Shiny Wilson led the nation with two golds and a silver at the 1991 Asian Athletics Championships. Men's distance runner Bahadur Prasad set national records and took a gold and a silver medal at the 1993 Asian Athletics Championships. The 1994 Asian Games highlighted India's fall at regional level again: with zero golds, women's runners Usha, Wilson and Kutty Saramma were involved in the nation's minor medals. Jyotirmoyee Sikdar marked her breakthrough in middle-distance with India's sole gold medals at the 1995 Asian Athletics Championships and the 1998 Asian Games. Usha won the final gold medal of her career with the women's 4 × 100 metres relay team at the 1998 Asian Athletics Championships, which was India's only gold that year.

=== 21st century ===
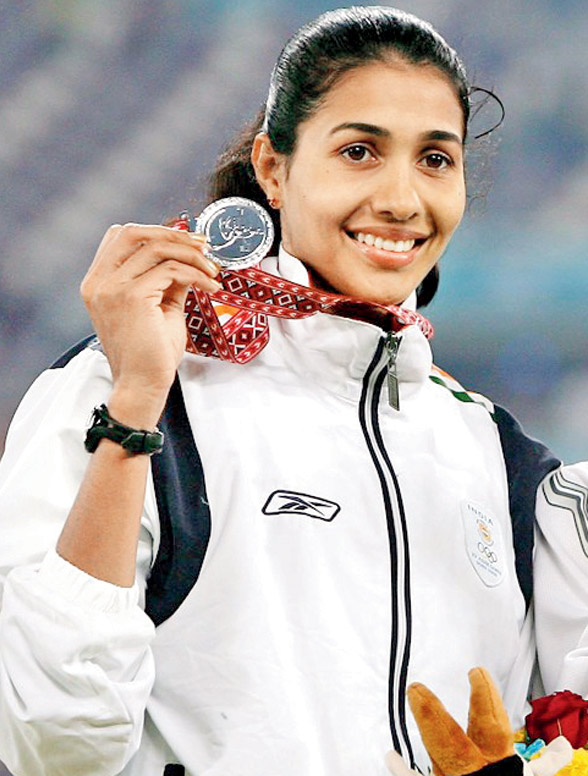
Anju Bobby George is one of India's few global athletics medallists

The start of the 21st century coincided with an improvement in the standard of performances in the sport in India. The country placed second at the 2000 Asian Athletics Championships, taking 21 of the medals available. It fell down the rankings at the 2002 edition, but still won ten medals and retained the women's 4 × 400 m relay title. After a long medal drought at the competition, discus thrower Neelam Jaswant Singh and long jumper Anju Bobby George reached the podium at the 2002 Commonwealth Games, becoming the first Indian women to do so. The 2002 Asian Games saw India return as a force at regional level, winning seven gold and 17 medals overall in athletics. On the women's side, Singh and George both won gold, K. M. Beenamol won 800 m and 4 × 400 m relay gold, Saraswati Saha won the 200 m, and Sunita Rani set the current Asian Games record in the 1500 metres. Bahadur Singh Sagoo was the sole men's gold medallist in the shot put.

Anju Bobby George made history when she won the bronze medal in Women's long jump at the 2003 World Championships in Athletics in Paris. With this achievement, she became the first Indian athlete ever to win a global athletics medal. Over the rest of the decade, she took fifth at the 2004 Summer Olympics, made two more finals at the World Championships in Athletics, won an Asian Championships title, and four more silver medals at Asian level. The Indian women's 4 × 400 metres relay team established itself as one of the best in the region in this decade, taking silver at the 2006 Commonwealth Games, gold at the 2006 Asian Games, seventh at the 2004 Olympics, and two Asian Championships titles in 2005 and 2007. Among the Indian relay runners were several athletes with individual success: Manjeet Kaur (2004 Asian Games runner-up), Chitra Soman (2007 Asian Championships winner) and Sathi Geetha (2005 Asian Championships runner-up). Other athletes who were successful during this period included 2007 Asian Championships men's triple jump champion Renjith Maheshwary, indoor and outdoor Asian men's shot put champion Navpreet Singh, Asian heptathlon medallists J. J. Shobha and Soma Biswas, and multiple Asian women's middle-distance runner Sinimole Paulose. Men's shot putter Om Prakash Karhana was India's sole winner at the 2009 Asian Athletics Championships, setting a championship record in the process.

The 2000s saw India begin to host major athletics events more frequently, with the 2004 Asian Cross Country Championships, 2003 Afro-Asian Games, 2004 IAAF World Half Marathon Championships, 2007 Military World Games, 2008 Commonwealth Youth Games and 2010 Commonwealth Games all representing the first time that India had hosted those competitions.

Krishna Poonia created history by winning the 2010 Commonwealth women's discus throw, becoming the first Commonwealth athletics gold medallist for India in 52 years and the first Indian woman to win an athletics gold at the Commonwealth Games. This was part of an Indian sweep of the women's discus, with Harwant Kaur and Seema Punia taking the minor medals. India won two athletics golds at a Commonwealth Games for the first time, as Manjeet Kaur, Sini Jose, Ashwini Akkunji and Mandeep Kaur secured the 4 × 400 m relay. That team returned at the 2010 Asian Games and achieved a Games record time in that victory. India won the second highest number of athletics gold medals there, with Akkunji and Joseph Abraham winning the 400 m hurdles titles, and women's distance runners Preeja Sreedharan and Sudha Singh also topping the podium. Mayookha Johny was India's best at the 2011 Asian Athletics Championships, winning the women's long jump and setting a triple jump national record. India performed well in the discus throw at the 2012 London Olympics, with Krishna Poonia and Vikas Gowda both making the finals. Irfan Kolothum Thodi also placed tenth in the men's 20 km walk with a national record time.

The 2013 Asian Athletics Championships held in Pune saw India accrue 17 medals. Gowda and the women's 4 × 400 metres relay team brought the country its two gold medals of the competition. Gowda was again victorious at the 2014 Commonwealth Games, winning a men's discus gold medal, and won silver at the 2014 Asian Games. The women's 4 × 400 metres relay team set an Asian Games record at that competition, with Priyanka Pawar, Tintu Lukka, Mandeep Kaur, and M. R. Poovamma clocking 3:28:68. Seema Punia brought India another gold in the women's discus event. The nation's gold medals at the 2015 Asian Athletics Championships were divided between men's throws (Inderjeet Singh and Vikas Gowda) and women's distance track events (Lalita Babar and Tintu Luka). Lalita Babar was the best performing Indian athlete at the 2016 Summer Olympics, placing tenth in the women's steeplechase.

India held the 2017 Asian Athletics Championships – its third time as host – and topped the medal table for the first time, beating China by twelve golds to eight. Govindan Lakshmanan won both the men's long-distance track events and Mohammad Anas and Arokia Rajiv took a men's 1–2 in the 400 m before winning the relay title. Neeraj Chopra won the men's javelin in a championship record of 85.23 m. Nirmala Sheoran was an individual and relay champion in women's 400 m. The remaining women's winners were P. U. Chitra (1500 m), Sudha Singh (steeplechase) and Swapna Barman (heptathlon). India extended its regional athletics success with second place at the 2018 Asian Games: Manjit Singh and Jinson Johnson won the men's middle distance titles, Arpinder Singh, Tejinder Pal Singh Toor and Neeraj Chopra won men's field titles, while the women' 4 × 400 m relay team and heptathlete Swapna Barman won the women's title. Throwing events proved to be India's forte at the 2018 Commonwealth Games, with Chopra adding a Commonwealth javelin title to his honours and Seema Punia making her fourth consecutive appearance on the Commonwealth women's discus podium.

Hima Das became India's first athlete to win a medal in a track event at an IAAF competition with her 400 m gold medal at the 2018 IAAF World U20 Championships. She is second gold medalist in athletics at IAAF World U20 Championships after Neeraj Chopra, who won men's javelin throw gold at the 2016 IAAF World U20 Championships with a world junior record mark.

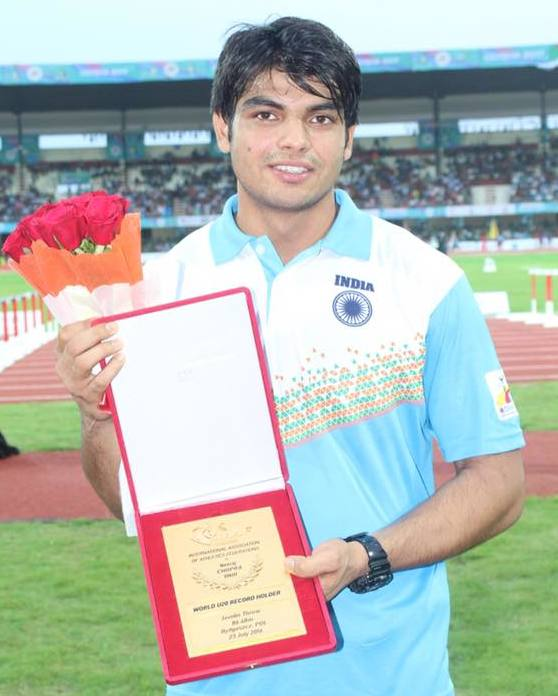
Neeraj Chopra, javelin thrower and India's first Olympic Gold medallist in athletics.

Neeraj Chopra won India's first-ever Olympic gold medal in athletics at the 2020 Summer Olympics (held in 2021) by throwing his best of 87.58 meters in the javelin throw final. Chopra is the first javelin thrower from India who won a gold medal, and only the second Indian sportsperson after Abhinav Bindra to win an Olympic gold medal.

In 2022, Awinash Sable and Priyanka Goswami created history by winning silver medals in 3000 m and 10,000 m steeplechase and racewalking at the Commonwealth Games, events in which India has historically been an underdog.

=== Para athletics ===
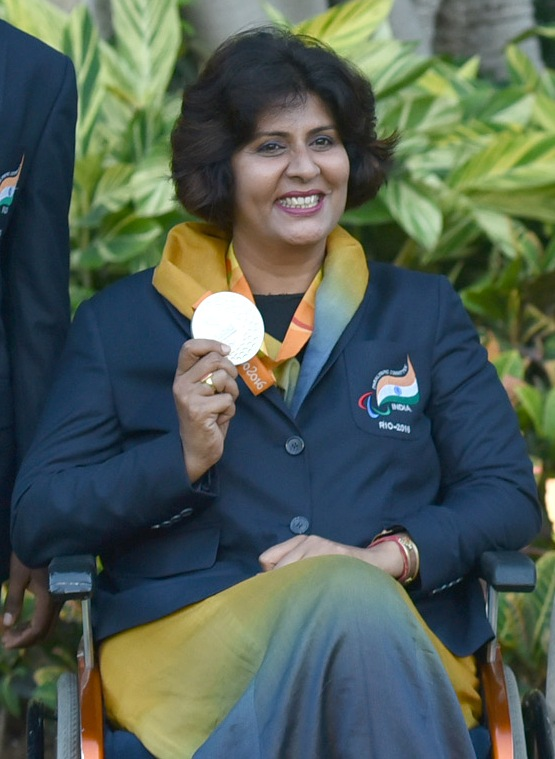
Deepa Malik – India's first women's Paralympic medallist

India first sent athletes at the 1968 Paralympic Games and won its first medals in 1984, when Joginder Singh Bedi won medals in three throwing events and Bhimrao Kesarkar took the javelin silver medal. Devendra Jhajharia became the nation's first Paralympic athletics champion in 2004, and only the second Indian to win in any Paralympic sport, after the swimmer Murlikant Petkar. The 2016 Summer Paralympics marked a new high for India as it win four medals, all in athletics: Mariyappan Thangavelu (high jump) and Devendra Jhajharia (javelin) won their events, Varun Singh Bhati took high jump bronze and Deepa Malik became India's first female Paralympic medallist with her shotput silver.

== Controversies ==
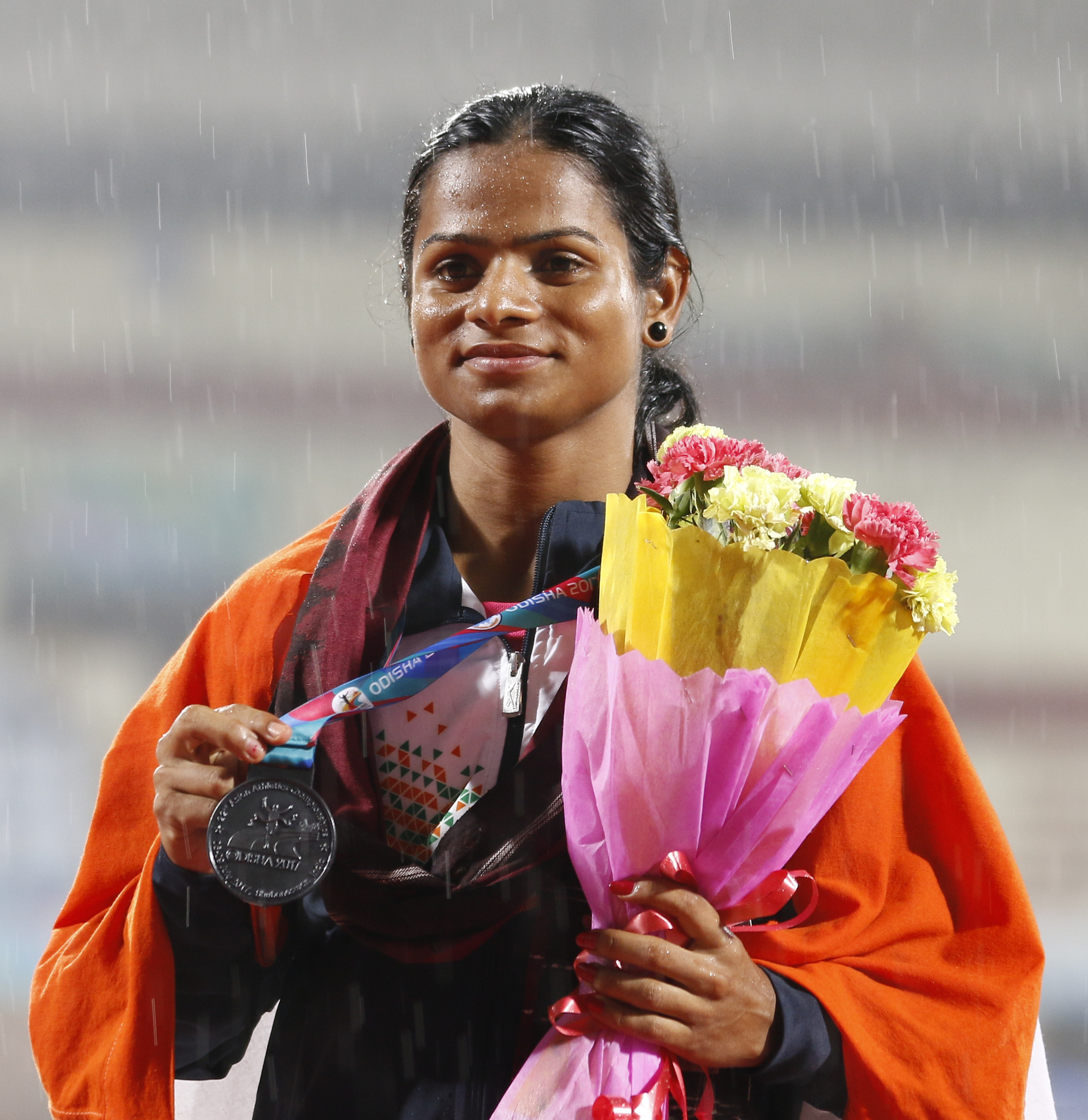
Dutee Chand won a landmark case on hyperandrogenism against the IAAF that had international impacts.

Indian athletes have been involved in several requests for sex verification in athletics in the 21st century.

In 2001, Indian athlete and swimmer Pratima Gaonkar committed suicide after disclosure and public commentary on her failed sex verification test. Santhi Soundarajan, who won the silver medal in the 800 m at the 2006 Asian Games, failed the sex verification test and was subsequently stripped of her medal. Another gold medallist at that competition, Pinki Pramanik, underwent medical tests in November 2012 that indicated she was a "male pseudo-hermaphrodite".

Dutee Chand was dropped from the 2014 Commonwealth Games at the last minute after the Athletic Federation of India stated that hyperandrogenism made her ineligible to compete as a female athlete. International policies on hyperandrogenism were suspended following the case of Dutee Chand v. Athletics Federation of India (AFI) & The International Association of Athletics Federations, in the Court of Arbitration for Sport, decided in July 2015. The ruling found that there was insufficient evidence that testosterone increased female athletic performance. In doing so the court immediately suspended the practice of hyperandrogenism regulation used by the IAAF and declared it void unless the organization could present better evidence by July 2017. The International Olympic Committee stated that it would not impose a maximum testosterone level for the 2016 Summer Olympics and, accordingly, Chand continued to compete internationally in the women's division.

== Hosting rights ==
India has hosted several major international athletics events. The first was the Western Asiatic Games in 1934. India's first global level athletics event came in the form of the 2004 IAAF World Half Marathon Championships.

- 1934 Western Asiatic Games
- 1951 Asian Games
- 1982 Asian Games
- 1987 South Asian Games
- 1989 Asian Athletics Championships
- 1992 Asian Junior Athletics Championships
- 1995 South Asian Games
- 1996 Asian Junior Athletics Championships
- 2003 Afro-Asian Games
- 2004 Asian Cross Country Championships
- 2004 IAAF World Half Marathon Championships
- 2007 Military World Games
- 2008 Commonwealth Youth Games
- 2010 Commonwealth Games
- 2010 Asian Marathon Championships
- 2013 Asian Athletics Championships
- 2013 South Asian Junior Athletics Championships
- 2014 Lusophony Games
- 2016 South Asian Games
- 2017 Asian Athletics Championships

== Venues ==
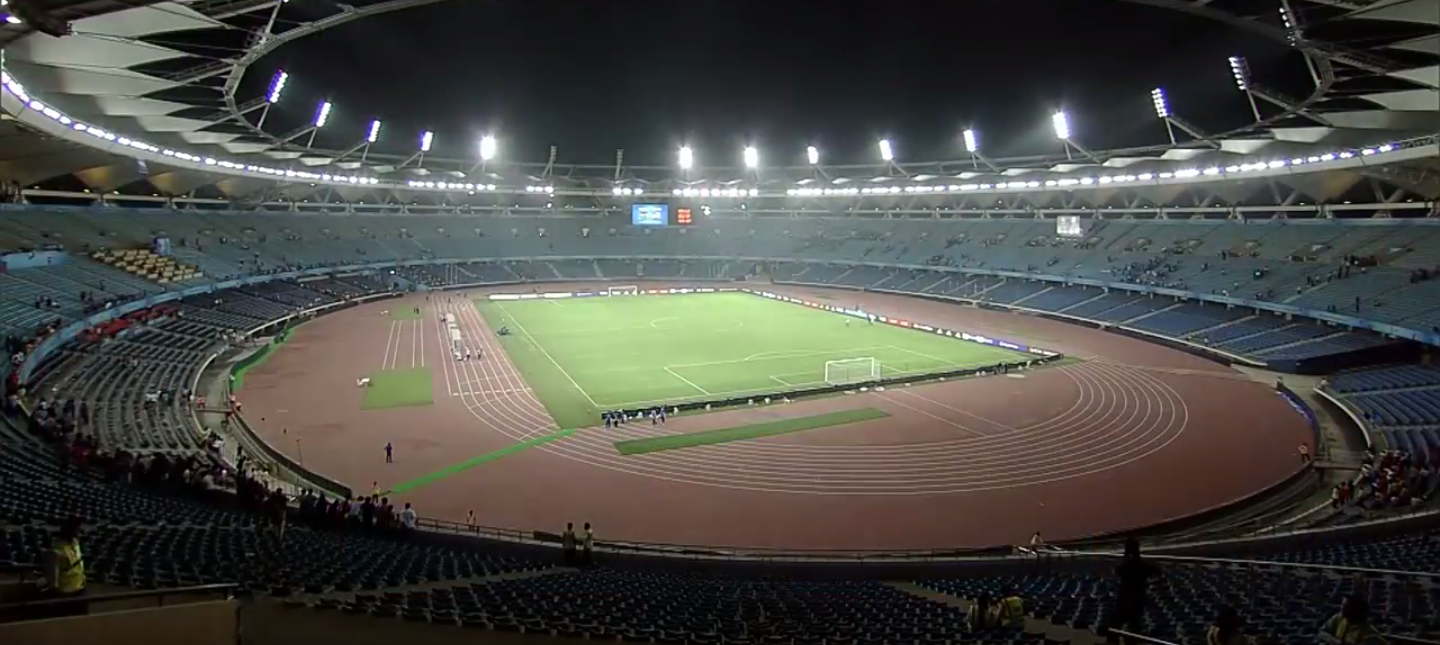
The Jawaharlal Nehru Stadium was the centerpiece for the 2010 Commonwealth Games in Delhi.

Numerous low-level athletics facilities exist in India, along with several large stadia for major athletics events. It is common for multi-purpose stadiums in India to include a running track for athletics.

- Angul Stadium
- Biju Patnaik Hockey Stadium
- Birsa Munda Athletics Stadium
- G. M. C. Balayogi Athletic Stadium
- Indira Gandhi Athletic Stadium
- Indira Gandhi Stadium, Alwar
- Jaipal Singh Stadium
- Jawaharlal Nehru Stadium (Chennai)
- Jawaharlal Nehru Stadium (Coimbatore)
- Jawaharlal Nehru Stadium (Delhi)
- JRD Tata Sports Complex
- Judges Field
- Kalinga Stadium
- Major Dhyan Chand Hockey Stadium, Jhansi
- MGR Race Course Stadium
- Nehru Stadium, Kottayam
- Shilaroo Hockey Stadium

== National events ==
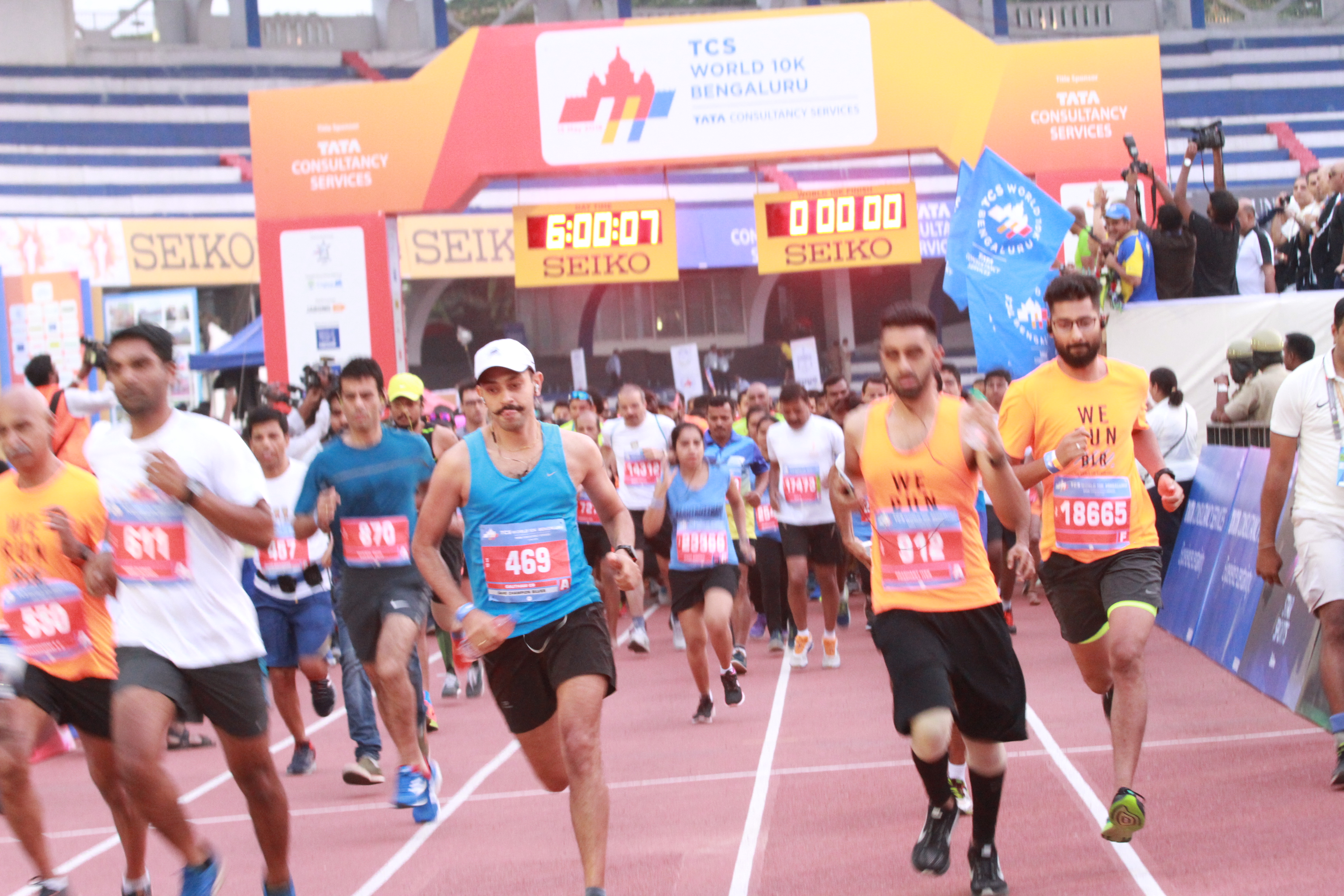
Start of the public race at the 2016 World 10K Bangalore

National championships

- Indian National Open Athletics Championships
- Indian Inter State Senior Athletics Championships
- Indian Marathon Championships
- Indian Cross Country Championships
- Indian Racewalking Championships

Road races

- Delhi Half Marathon
- Kashmir International Half Marathon
- Pinkathon
- World 10K Bangalore

Marathons

- Auroville Marathon
- Bangalore Marathon
- Calicut Mini Marathon
- Chennai Marathon
- GiveLife Chennai Marathon
- Goa Marathon
- Great Tibetan Marathon
- Hyderabad Marathon
- Indian Marathon
- Indira Marathon
- Indore Marathon
- Jaipur Marathon
- Kolkata Marathon
- Ladakh Marathon
- Mumbai Marathon
- Patna Marathon
- Pune International Marathon
- Sabarmati Marathon
- Vadodara Marathon
- Vasai-Virar Mayor's Marathon

Competition	Athlete	Medal	Event	Year
Olympics	Norman Pritchard	2nd place, silver medalist(s)	200m	1900
Olympics	Norman Pritchard	2nd place, silver medalist(s)	200m hurdles	1900
Olympics	Neeraj Chopra	1st place, gold medalist(s)	Javelin throw	2020
Olympics	Neeraj Chopra	2nd place, silver medalist(s)	Javelin throw	2024
World Championships	Anju Bobby George	3rd place, bronze medalist(s)	Long jump	2003
World Championships	Neeraj Chopra	2nd place, silver medalist(s)	Javelin throw	2022
World Championships	Neeraj Chopra	1st place, gold medalist(s)	Javelin throw	2023
Commonwealth Games	Milkha Singh	1st place, gold medalist(s)	440 yards	1958
Commonwealth Games	Praveen Kumar	2nd place, silver medalist(s)	Hammer throw	1966
Commonwealth Games	Mohinder Singh Gill	3rd place, bronze medalist(s)	Triple jump	1970
Commonwealth Games	Mohinder Singh Gill	2nd place, silver medalist(s)	Triple jump	1974
Commonwealth Games	Suresh Babu	3rd place, bronze medalist(s)	Long jump	1978
Commonwealth Games	Neelam Jaswant Singh	2nd place, silver medalist(s)	Discus throw	2002
Commonwealth Games	Anju Bobby George	3rd place, bronze medalist(s)	Long jump	2002
Commonwealth Games	Seema Punia	2nd place, silver medalist(s)	Discus throw	2006
Commonwealth Games	Rajwinder Kaur; Chitra Soman; Manjeet Kaur; Pinki Pramanik	2nd place, silver medalist(s)	4 × 400 m relay	2006
Commonwealth Games	Ranjith Kumar Jayaseelan	3rd place, bronze medalist(s)	Discus throw (EAD)	2006
Commonwealth Games	Krishna Poonia	1st place, gold medalist(s)	Discus throw	2010
Commonwealth Games	Manjeet Kaur; Sini Jose; Ashwini Akkunji; Mandeep Kaur; Jauna Murmu; Chitra Soman	1st place, gold medalist(s)	4 × 400 m relay	2010
Commonwealth Games	Vikas Gowda	2nd place, silver medalist(s)	Discus throw	2010
Commonwealth Games	M. A. Prajusha	2nd place, silver medalist(s)	Long jump	2010
Commonwealth Games	Harwant Kaur	2nd place, silver medalist(s)	Discus throw	2010
Commonwealth Games	Kavita Tungar	3rd place, bronze medalist(s)	10,000 m	2010
Commonwealth Games	Harminder Singh	3rd place, bronze medalist(s)	20 km walk	2010
Commonwealth Games	Seema Punia	3rd place, bronze medalist(s)	Discus throw	2010
Commonwealth Games	Geetha Saati; Srabani Nanda; P. K. Priya; H. M. Jyothi	3rd place, bronze medalist(s)	4 × 100 m relay	2010
Commonwealth Games	Rahamatulla Molla; Suresh Sathya; Shameer Mon; Abdul Najeeb Qureshi	3rd place, bronze medalist(s)	4 × 100 m relay	2010
Commonwealth Games	Renjith Maheshwary	3rd place, bronze medalist(s)	Triple jump	2010
Commonwealth Games	Kashinath Naik	3rd place, bronze medalist(s)	Javelin throw	2010
Commonwealth Games	Vikas Gowda	1st place, gold medalist(s)	Discus throw	2014
Commonwealth Games	Seema Punia	2nd place, silver medalist(s)	Discus throw	2014
Commonwealth Games	Arpinder Singh	3rd place, bronze medalist(s)	Triple jump	2014
Commonwealth Games	Neeraj Chopra	1st place, gold medalist(s)	Javelin throw	2018
Commonwealth Games	Seema Punia	2nd place, silver medalist(s)	Discus throw	2018
Commonwealth Games	Navjeet Dhillon	3rd place, bronze medalist(s)	Discus throw	2018
Commonwealth Games	Eldhose Paul	1st place, gold medalist(s)	Triple jump	2022
Commonwealth Games	Murali Sreeshankar	2nd place, silver medalist(s)	Long jump	2022
Commonwealth Games	Priyanka Goswami	2nd place, silver medalist(s)	10,000 m walk	2022
Commonwealth Games	Avinash Sable	2nd place, silver medalist(s)	Steeplechase	2022
Commonwealth Games	Abdulla Aboobacker	2nd place, silver medalist(s)	Triple jump	2022
Commonwealth Games	Tejaswin Shankar	3rd place, bronze medalist(s)	High jump	2022
Commonwealth Games	Sandeep Kumar	3rd place, bronze medalist(s)	10,000 m walk	2022
Commonwealth Games	Annu Rani	3rd place, bronze medalist(s)	Javelin throw	2022

== Notable Olympics performances ==
Year	Event	Player	Result
1960	Men's 400 metres	Milkha Singh	4th
1964	Men's 110 metres hurdles	Gurbachan Singh Randhawa	5th
1976	Men's 800 metres	Sriram Singh	7th
1984	Women's 400 metres hurdles	P. T. Usha	4th
1984	Women's 4 × 400 metres relay	P. T. Usha; Shiny Abraham; Vandana Rao; M. D. Valsamma	7th
2004	Women's long jump	Anju Bobby George	5th
2004	Women's 4 × 400 metres relay	K. M. Beenamol; Sathi Geetha; Chitra Soman; Rajwinder Kaur	7th
2012	Women's discus throw	Krishna Poonia	6th
2012	Men's discus throw	Vikas Gowda	8th
2016	Women's 3000 metres steeplechase	Lalita Babar	10th
2020	Men's javelin throw	Neeraj Chopra	1st place, gold medalist(s)
2020	Women's discus throw	Kamalpreet Kaur	6th
2020	Men's 4 × 400 metres relay	Muhammed Anas; Noah Nirmal Tom; Amoj Jacob; Arokia Rajiv	9th AR
2024	Men's javelin throw	Neeraj Chopra	2nd place, silver medalist(s)
2024	Men's 3000 metres steeplechase	Avinash Sable	11th

== Medal table ==
Competition	Gold	Silver	Bronze	Total
Olympic Games	10	10	21	41
Paralympic Games	8	16	13	35
World Championships	1	1	1	3
Asian Games	85	102	96	283
Asian Para Games	?	?	?	?
Commonwealth Games	6	14	16	36
Asian Championships	94	120	140	354
Asian Indoor Championships	16	31	21	68
Asian Marathon Championships	3	1	3	7
Asian Cross Country Championships	7	15	13	35
Asian Race Walking Championships	2	2	5	9
Total	215	288	295	798

- Updated till 11 August 2024

== Arjuna awardees ==
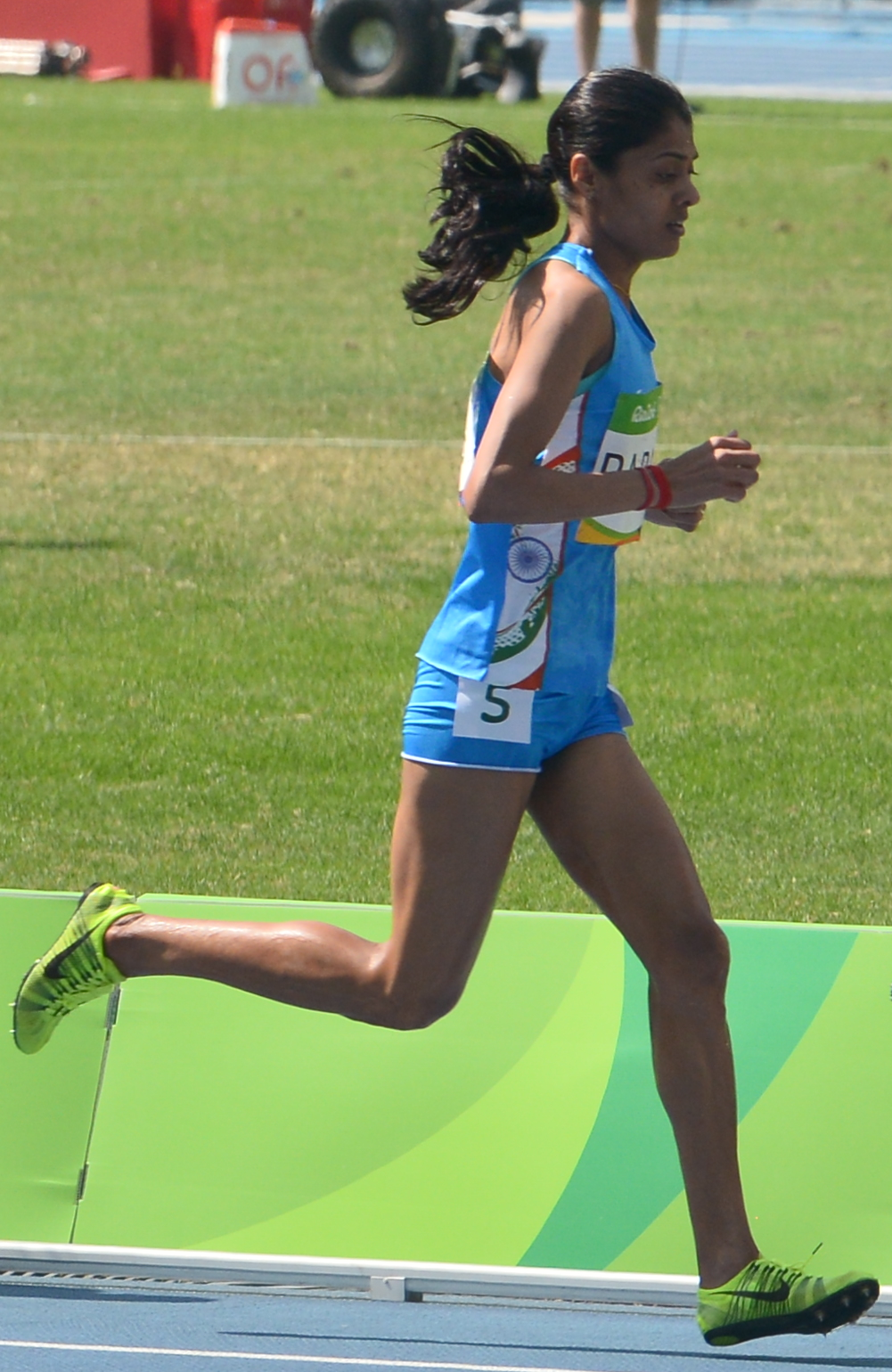
Lalita Babar, an Indian long-distance runner, was honoured with Arjuna Award in 2016.

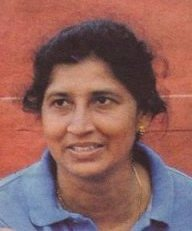
Long jumper Mercy Kuttan received the award in 1989

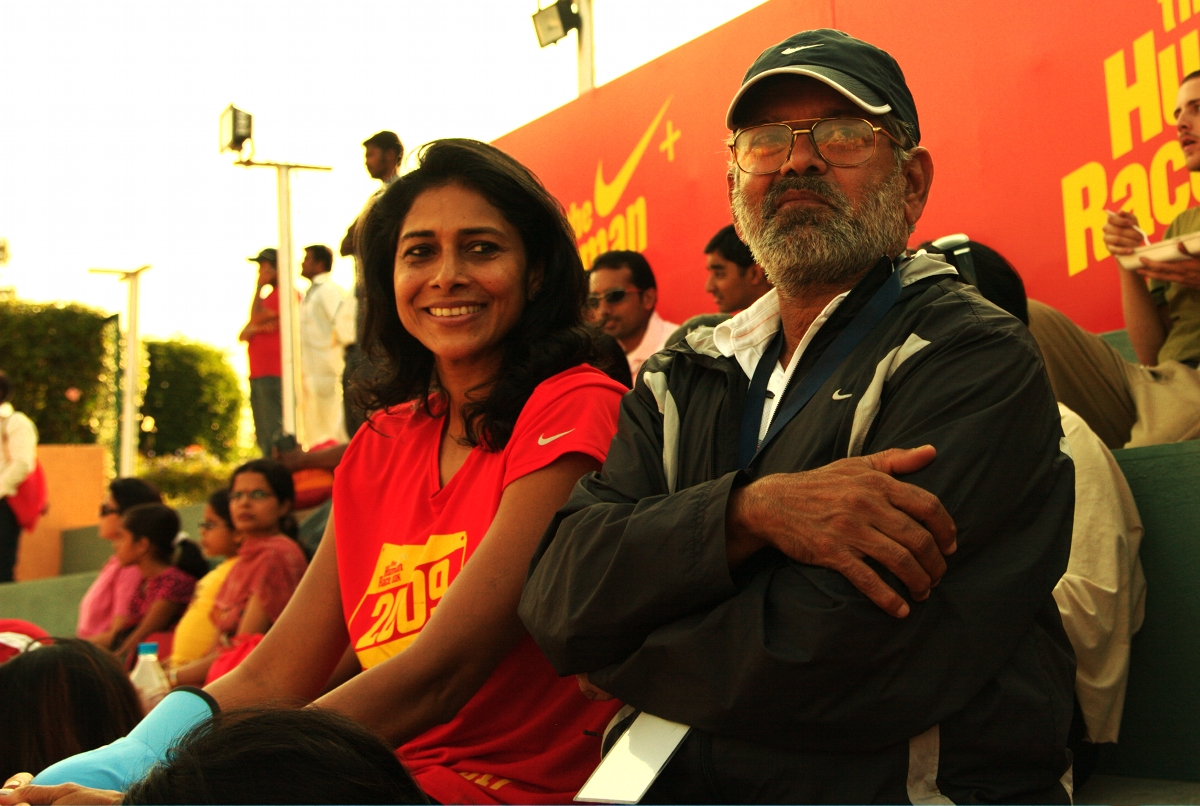
Multi-eventer Reeth Abraham (with coach Beedu) was a 1997 awardee.

The Arjuna Awards are given by the Ministry of Youth Affairs and Sports, Government of India each year to recognize outstanding achievement in sports. A significant number of athletics competitors have been given the award. This has included both able-bodied athletes and disabled sportspeople.

‡ - Para Athlete § - Lifetime Contribution

S.No.	Year	Name
1	1961	Gurbachan Singh Randhawa
2	1962	Tarlok Singh
3	1963	Stephie D'Souza
4	1964	Makhan Singh
5	1965	Kenneth Powell
6	1966	Ajmer Singh
7	1966	Bhogeswar Baruah
8	1967	Praveen Kumar
9	1967	Bhim Singh
10	1968	Joginder Singh
11	1968	Manjit Walia
12	1969	Harnek Singh
13	1970	Mohinder Singh Gill
14	1971	Edward Sequeira
15	1972	Vijay Singh Chauhan
16	1973	Sriram Singh
17	1974	T. C. Yohannan
18	1974	Shivnath Singh
19	1975	Hari Chand
20	1975	V. Anusuya Bai
21	1976	Bahadur Singh
22	1976	Geeta Zutshi
23	1977–78	Satish Kumar
24	1978–79	Suresh Babu
25	1978–79	Angel Mary Joseph
26	1979–80	Ramaswamy Gnanasekaran
27	1980–81	Gopal Saini
28	1981	Sabir Ali
29	1982	Charles Borromeo
30	1982	Chand Ram
31	1982	M. D. Valsamma
32	1983	Suresh Yadav
33	1983	P. T. Usha
34	1984	Raj Kumar
35	1984	Shiny Abraham
36	1985	Raghubir Singh Bal
38	1985	Asha Agarwal
39	1985	Adille Sumariwala
39	1986	Suman Rawat
40	1987	Balwinder Singh
41	1987	Vandana Rao
42	1987	Bagicha Singh
43	1987	Vandana Shanbagh
44	1988	Ashwini Nachappa
45	1989	Mercy Kuttan
46	1990	Deena Ram
47	1992	Bahadur Prasad
48	1993	K. Saramma
49	1994	Rosa Kutty
50	1995	Shakti Singh
51	1995	Jyotirmoyee Sikdar
52	1995	Malathi Krishnamurthy Holla ‡
53	1996	Kallegowda ‡
54	1996	Ajit Bhaduria
55	1996	Padmini Thomas
56	1997	M. Mahadeva ‡
57	1997	Reeth Abraham
58	1998	Sirichand Ram
59	1998	Neelam Jaswant Singh
60	1998	S. D. Eshan
61	1998	Rachita Mistry
62	1998	Paramjit Singh
63	1999	Gulab Chand
64	1999	G. Venkataravanappa ‡
65	1999	Gurmit Kaur
66	1999	Parduman Singh
67	1999	Sunita Rani
68	2000	K. M. Beenamol
69	2000	Yadvendra Vashishta ‡
70	2000	Joginder Singh Bedi ‡ §
71	2001	K.R. Shankar Iyer ‡
72	2002	Anju Bobby George
73	2002	Saraswati Saha
74	2003	Soma Biswas
75	2003	Madhuri Saxena
76	2004	Anil Kumar
77	2004	J. J. Shobha
78	2004	Devendra Jhajharia ‡
79	2005	Manjeet Kaur
80	2006	K. M. Binu
81	2007	Chitra Soman
82	2009	Sinimole Paulose
83	2010	Joseph Abraham
84	2010	Krishna Poonia
85	2010	Jagseer Singh ‡
86	2011	Preeja Sreedharan
87	2012	Sudha Singh
88	2012	Kavita Tungar
89	2012	Deepa Malik ‡
90	2012	Ramkaran Singh ‡
91	2013	Amit Kumar Saroha
92	2014	Tintu Lukka
93	2015	M. R. Poovamma
94	2016	Lalita Babar
95	2016	Sandeep Singh Maan ‡
96	2017	Khushbir Kaur
97	2017	Arokia Rajiv
98	2017	Mariyappan Thangavelu ‡
99	2017	Varun Singh Bhati ‡
100	2018	Jinson Johnson
101	2018	Hima Das
102	2018	Neeraj Chopra
103	2018	Ankur Dhama ‡
104	2019	Muhammed Anas
105	2019	Swapna Barman
106	2019	Tejinder Pal Singh Toor
107	2019	Sundar Singh Gurjar ‡
108	2020	Dutee Chand
109	2020	Sandeep Chaudhary ‡
110	2021	Arpinder Singh
111	2021	Yogesh Kathuniya ‡
112	2021	Nishad Kumar ‡
113	2021	Praveen Kumar ‡
114	2021	Sharad Kumar ‡
115	2022	Seema Punia
116	2022	Eldhose Paul
117	2022	Avinash Sable
118	2023	Parul Chaudhary
119	2023	M Sreeshankar

== See also ==
- Sport in India
- India at the Olympics
- List of Indian records in athletics
- List of National Sports Award recipients in athletics
