= India at the 1920 Summer Olympics =

- Flag of India
- IOC code: IND

in Antwerp
- Competitors: 5 in 2 sports
- Flag bearer: Purma Bannerjee
- Medals: Gold 0 Silver 0 Bronze 0 Total 0

Summer Olympics appearances (overview)
- 1900; 1904–1912; 1920; 1924; 1928; 1932; 1936; 1948; 1952; 1956; 1960; 1964; 1968; 1972; 1976; 1980; 1984; 1988; 1992; 1996; 2000; 2004; 2008; 2012; 2016; 2020; 2024

India competed in the 1920 Summer Olympics in Antwerp, Belgium. It was the country's second participation in the Summer Olympics after a single athlete, Norman Pritchard, competed in the 1900 Summer Olympics. India sent a contingent consisting of five athletes competing across two sports in the Games. India competed in the wrestling event for the first time in the history of the Games. Purma Bannerjee served as the flag bearer during the opening ceremony.

== Background ==
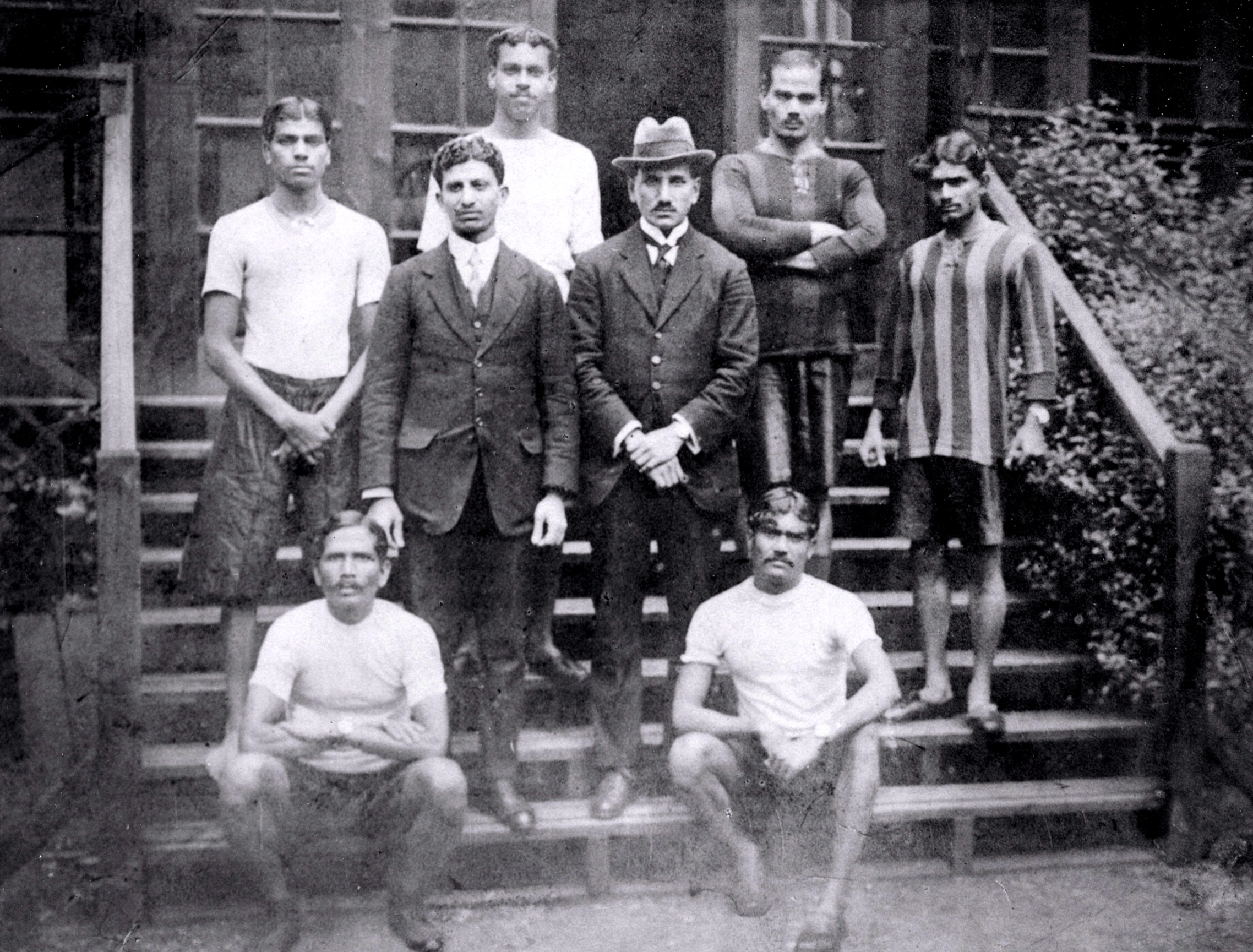
Indian Olympic delegation 1920: (top left to right) D. Shinde, Bannerjee, Navale, Chaugule; (middle) Bhoot, Fyzee; (seated) Datar, Kaikadi

India competed in the 1920 Summer Olympics held in Antwerp, Belgium. It was the country's second participation in the Summer Olympics after a single athlete (Norman Pritchard) competed in the 1900 Summer Olympics.

During a sports meet at the Deccan Gymkhana in Pune in 1919, the Gymkhana president Dorabji Tata expressed a desire for India to take part in the 1920 Summer Olympics. He requested Lloyd George, the Governor of Bombay, who presided the meet, to secure representation for India at the Olympics through the British Olympic Committee. As a result, in February 1920, the International Olympic Committee granted India affiliation to participate in the Olympic Games.

Thereafter, a committee consisting of Dorab Tata, Hassan Ali Fyzee, Sohrab bhoot, and other Deccan Gymkhana members met in March 1920 to discuss India's Olympic participation, and decided to hold a trial meet in Pune in April 1920. At the trial meet, the committee selected Purma Bannerjee, P. D. Chaugule, Sadashiv Datar, and H. D. Kaikadi for athletics, Dinkarrao Shinde and Kumar Navale for wrestling. Bhoot was the manager and Fyzee was the medical officer and adviser for the team. Dorabji Tata donated ₹8,000 (equivalent to ₹1.5 million or US$17,000 in 2023), while the Indian government gave ₹6,000 (equivalent to ₹1.1 million or US$13,000 in 2023), with private donations amounting to ₹7,000 (equivalent to ₹1.3 million or US$15,000 in 2023).

The team left Bombay on 5 June aboard the SS Mantua, and trained in Stamford Bridge in London for six weeks under English coach H. Parry before proceeding to Antwerp. After the Games, Bhoot submitted a report mentioning that India could have future Olympic success in hockey and wrestling and made recommendations concerning technical, organisational, and training issues for future Olympic teams. The committee that sent the team met again, and on the advice of Dorabji Tata, and formed the provisional Indian Olympic Committee with Tata as its president and A. G. Noehren as secretary. This provisional committee sent an Indian team to the 1924 Summer Olympics, and became the Indian Olympic Association in 1927.

== Competitors ==
There were five athletes who took part in two sports.

Competitors representing India
Sport	Men	Women	Total
Athletics	3	0	3
Wrestling	2	0	2
Total	5	0	5

== Athletics ==
Four Indians qualified for the athletics events at the Olympics. However, H. D. Kaikadi did not compete in the event. Purma Bannerjee did not advance from the initial qualification heats in the men's 100 and 400 metre events. In the marathon event, Phadeppa Chaugule finished 19th overall while Sadashiv Datar failed to record a finish.

Athlete	Event	Heats		Quarterfinals		Semifinals		Final	
Athlete	Event	Result	Rank	Result	Rank	Result	Rank	Result	Rank
Purma Bannerjee	100 m	Unknown	5	Did not advance					
Purma Bannerjee	400 m	53.1	4	Did not advance					
Phadeppa Chaugule	10000 m	—N/a				Did not finish		Did not advance	
Phadeppa Chaugule	Marathon	—N/a						2:50:45.4	19
Sadashiv Datar	Marathon	—N/a						Did not finish	

Note: Ranks given are within the heat.

== Wrestling ==
Two wrestlers Dinkarrao Shinde and Kumar Navale represented India in the wrestling events. It was the nation's debut appearance in the sport. Navale was lost in the first round, while Dinkarrao Shinde won the quarterfinals before losing in the semifinals and the bronze medal match to finish fourth.

=== Freestyle ===
Wrestler	Event	Round of 32	Round of 16	Quarterfinals	Semifinals	Finals / Bronze match	Rank
Dinkarrao Shinde	Featherweight	—N/a	Bye	Inman (GBR) (W)	Gerson (USA) (L)	Bernard (GBR) (L)	4
Kumar Navale	Middleweight	Bye	Johnson (USA)	Did not advance			9

Opponent nation	Wins	Losses
Great Britain	1	1
United States	0	2
Total	1	3

Round	Wins	Losses
Round of 16	0	1
Quarterfinals	1	0
Semifinals	0	1
Bronze match	0	1
Total	1	3
