= Wrestling at the 1920 Summer Olympics – Men's freestyle featherweight =

1920 Men's Wrestling

Men's featherweight freestyle wrestling at the Games of the VII Olympiad
- Venue: Olympisch Stadion
- Dates: August 25–27
- Competitors: 10 from 7 nations

Medalists
1st place, gold medalist(s)		Charles Ackerly	United States
2nd place, silver medalist(s)		Sam Gerson	United States
3rd place, bronze medalist(s)		Bernard Bernard	Great Britain

The men's freestyle featherweight was a Catch as Catch Can wrestling, later freestyle, event held as part of the wrestling at the 1920 Summer Olympics programme. It was the third appearance of the event. Featherweight was the lightest category, and included wrestlers weighing up to 54 kilograms.

A total of ten wrestlers from seven nations competed in the event, which was held from Wednesday, August 25 to Friday, August 27, 1920.

== Results ==
Round of 16; August 25
Charles Ackerly (USA)	W
Ioannis Dialetis (GRE)	L
Daniel Kaiser (SUI)	-
Bye	-
Bernard Bernard (GBR)	-
Bye	-
Jean Harrasse (FRA)	-
Bye	-
Sam Gerson (USA)	W
Kaarlo Mäkinen (FIN)	L
Georges Barathon (FRA)	-
Bye	-
Dinkarrao Shinde (IND)	-
Bye	-
Henry Inman (GBR)	-
Bye	-

Quarterfinals; August 26
Charles Ackerly (USA)	W
Daniel Kaiser (SUI)	L
Bernard Bernard (GBR)	W
Jean Harrasse (FRA)	L
Sam Gerson (USA)	W
Georges Barathon (FRA)	L
Dinkarrao Shinde (IND)	W
Henry Inman (GBR)	L

Semifinals; August 27
Charles Ackerly (USA)	W
Bernard Bernard (GBR)	L
Sam Gerson (USA)	W
Dinkarrao Shinde (IND)	L

Final; August 27
Charles Ackerly (USA)	W
Sam Gerson (USA)	L
Third place
Bernard Bernard (GBR)	W
Dinkarrao Shinde (IND)	L
