= Florence Barla =

Indian athlete

Florence Barla (born 2001) is an Indian athlete from Jharkhand. She competes in 400m and she is named in the Indian athletics team for the 2022 Asian Games at Hangzhou, China.

== Early life ==
Florence hails from Nawadih village in Gumla district, Jharkhand. Her mother Rojliya Aind is a daily labourer and her father died in 2013. She is the youngest among the six siblings. She did her Class 11 and 12 at DAV Nandraj School. She is training under coach Ashu Bhatia from 2017 at the age of 15 at Khel Gaoan Stadium in Ranchi. Her sister Ashakiran Barla is also an athlete. She won a silver at Commonwealth Youth Games at Port of Spain, Trinidad in August 2023. In June 2019, she was felicitated by the Central Coalfield Limited (CCL) and Jharkhand State Sports Promotion Society (JSSPS).

== Career ==
- 2023: In September, she took part in the Indian Grand Prix in Chandigarh.
- 2022: She won a bronze at the Federation Cup in Ranchi which helped her to get into the Indian camp for the Asian Games as a 400m relay prospect.
- 2022: National Athletics meet in Bhubaneswar.
- 2020: Florence was selected for the 19th Asian Junior Athletics Championship in Bangkok but the meet was cancelled due to Covid. She achieved the qualifying mark at the International Invitational Athletics Championship in Kazakhstan in 2019 where she won the gold clocking 54.73 seconds.
