= Jean Harrasse =

French wrestler

- Born: 13 February 1887; Lorrez-le-Bocage-Préaux, France
- Died: 13 July 1973 (aged 86); Villemoisson-sur-Orge, France

Jean Harrasse (13 February 1887 – 13 July 1973) was a French wrestler. He competed in the freestyle featherweight event at the 1920 Summer Olympics.
