= Daniel Kaiser (wrestler) =

Swiss wrestler

Daniel Kaiser was a Swiss wrestler. He competed in the freestyle featherweight event at the 1920 Summer Olympics.
