= Indore Marathon =

- Location: Indore, Madhya Pradesh, India
- Event type: Half-Marathon
- Distance: 21 Km, 10, km, 5, km
- Primary sponsor: Reliance Jio
- Established: 2015
- Website: Indore Marathon

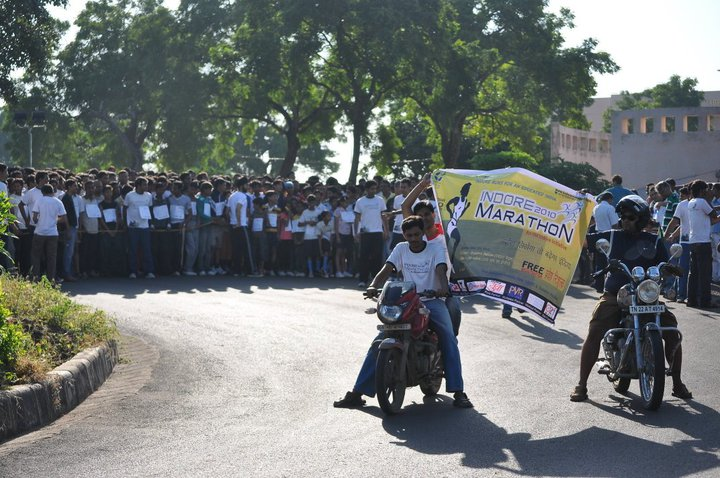
Indore Marathon

Indore Marathon is an annual marathon race organised in Indore, Madhya Pradesh, India. It is organised by Indore Municipal Corporation as Reliance Jio as its title sponsor. Every Year Participants from all over Indore & from the country take part in the Marathon.

It is established in 2015 with the motto of Healthy and Smart Indore.

== Half Marathon ==
The Half Marathon (21 km) starts from outside Nehru Stadium after passing through Geeta Bhawan, Palasia, LIG Square, Teen Puliya, LIG Square, Vijay Nagar and will end at Nehru Stadium.

== 10 Km Marathon ==
The 10 km Marathon starts from outside Nehru Stadium after passing through Geeta Bhawan, Palasia, LIG Square, Pardesipura and will end at Nehru Stadium.

== Prize money ==
Rs. 50,000 each for international male winner and international female winner for Half Marathon. Rs. 30, 000 each for international male winner and international female winner for 10 km Marathon and no prize money for 5 km Marathon.

== Winners ==
=== Marathon ===
Key: Course record

| Edition | Year | Men's winner | Time (h:m:s) | Women's winner | Time (h:m:s) |
|---|---|---|---|---|---|
| | 2020 | Patle Gajilal Beniram (IND) | 2:37:06 | Rajkumari Rajkumari (IND) | 3:29:49 |
Editions 2021 and 2022 were not held due to COVID-19 pandemic in India
| | 2023 | Savaliram Shinde (IND) | 2:58:19 | Preeti Khandelwal (IND) | 3:58:01 |

=== Half marathon ===
Key: Course record

| Edition | Year | Men's winner | Time (h:m:s) | Women's winner | Time (h:m:s) |
|---|---|---|---|---|---|
| | 2019 | Noah Kemei (KEN) | 1:09:08 | Christine Muyanga (KEN) | 1:18:49 |
| | 2020 | Satendar Singh (IND) | 1:07:52 | Manju Yadav (IND) | 1:24:11 |
Editions 2021 and 2022 were not held due to COVID-19 pandemic in India
| | 2023 | Naveen Chouhan (IND) | 1:09:35 | Raj Kumari (IND) | 1:31:24 |
| | 2024 | Santosh Joshi (IND) | 1:08:31 | Phoolan Pal (IND) | 1:20:46 |
