= Bernard Bernard (wrestler) =

British wrestler (1890–1975)

Olympic medal record

Men's freestyle wrestling

Representing Great Britain

Olympic Games
| Bronze medal – third place | 1920 Antwerp | Featherweight |

Bernard Bernard (b. 5 August 1890, Tottenham, England; d. 15 July 1975, Guadalajara, Mexico) was a self-described "editor, author, philosopher, scientist, idealist and champion wrestler." As a British wrestler he competed in the 1920 Summer Olympics, winning the bronze medal in the freestyle wrestling featherweight class (Bernard was 1.55 meters tall, less than 5'1") in a match against Dinkarrao Shinde.

== Life and Career ==
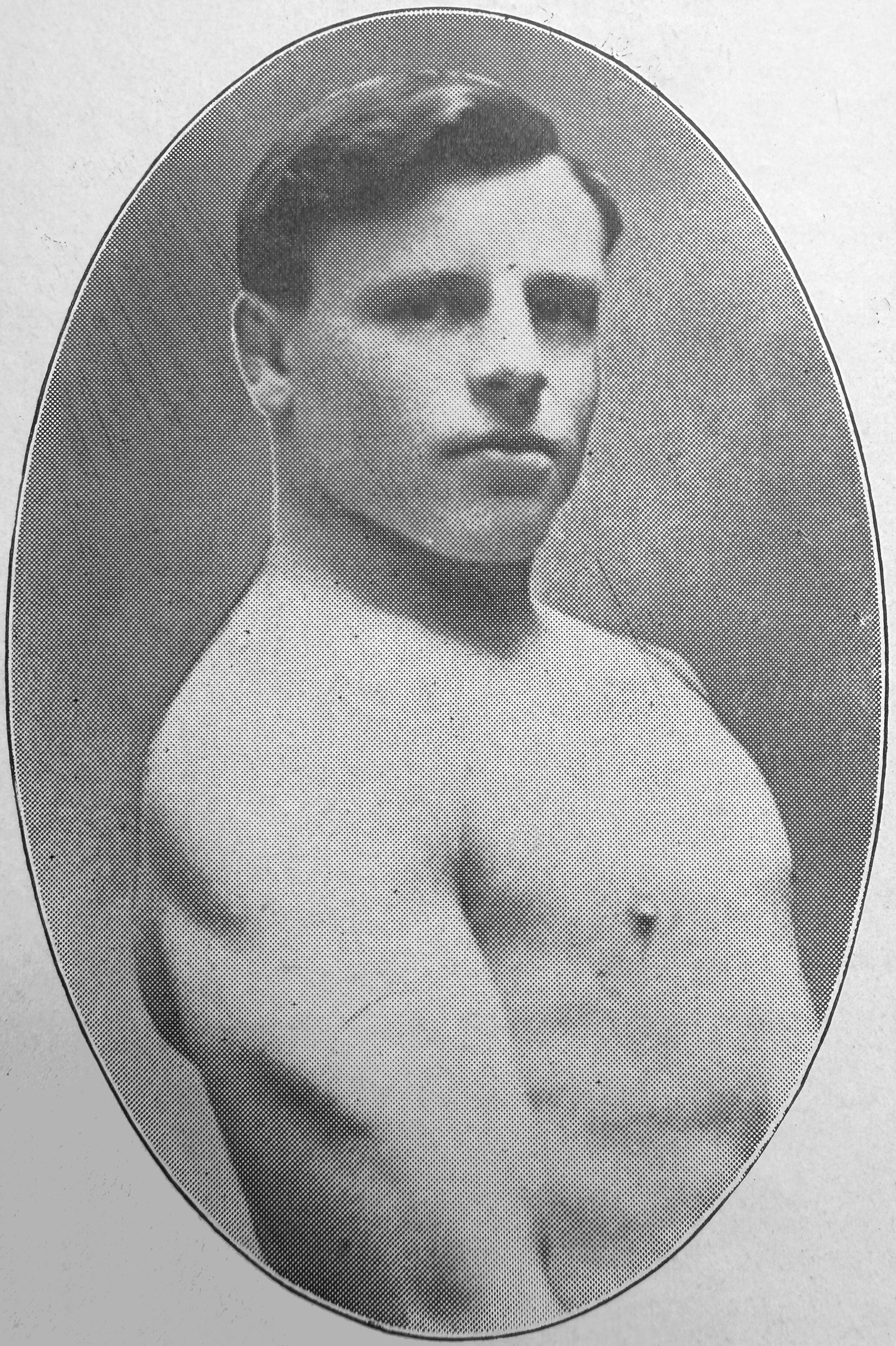
A photo of Bernard from his book Sex Conduct in Marriage (1922).

Bernard was born in England to German immigrants, and his original name was Otto Bernhard Trappschuh. Because of anti-German sentiment in the wake of World War I, he was one of thousands of British citizens who changed their German patronymic, in his case from Trappschuh to Bernard, and from 1920 he was known as Bernard Bernard. He changed his name again in October 1935 by deed poll, to Bernard Lytton-Bernard.

At the age of 16 he contracted rheumatic fever and was told by doctors that he was unlikely to live beyond the age of 21 or 22. Striving to recover, he became a vegetarian and a health and fitness enthusiast.

As a wrestler, Bernard started his career at the German Gymnastic Society in London and in 1910 won the National Amateur Wrestling Society’s Cumberland and Westmorland bantamweight title. He won the freestyle bantamweight title at the Finsbury Park open-air competition in 1914.

Bernard received a Bachelor of Physiology degree from the London College of Physiology. He became editor of the British magazine Health and Vim in February 1915, a post he left in September 1916 when he was called to serve in the British army. He appealed for conscientious objector status. At the Military Service Act tribunal which heard his appeal, he was asked: “What would you do if attacked by an armed assailant?” Pointing out that he had won two wrestling titles, he replied, "I would try to put a lock on him that wouldn’t hurt him. In no circumstance would I take his life." The appeal was dismissed and Otto Bernhard Trappschuh went on to serve in the Duke of Cambridge’s Own (Middlesex Regiment). He saw action in France, Belgium, and Gallipoli, and was awarded the British War Medal and the Victory Medal.

After winning his Olympic medal in 1920, he toured England with strongman Edward Aston, giving lectures on physical culture and demonstrating wrestling and self-defence moves. He became the editor of Health and Life, a monthly magazine published in both the United States and Great Britain and billed as "the only physical culture magazine in the world edited by an active champion athlete." He was also an author of books published by Health and Life Publications, including Sex Conduct in Marriage (1922), Eating to Correct Ill-Health (1924), and A Complete Book of Sex Knowledge (1926).

Bernard lived in New York City and in California in the 1920s, working as a journalist. In 1928, with Clara Louisa Glover, he was involved in a mail order scam which promised to make short people become taller. The fraud grossed Glover and Bernard over $26,000.

Bernard returned to England in 1935 and stood as a Labour Party candidate in the Spelthorne constituency; he was decisively beated by Conservative incumbent Reginald Blaker.

He left England as World War II was looming and, as a self-styled scientist, philosopher, and humanitarian, traveled to India, South Africa, Cuba, Chile, and Nice, where he operated a school of finance, teaching people how to play the stock market. He ended up in Mexico, where he opened a health resort. He died in Guadalajara in 1975.
