= Georges Barathon =

French wrestler

Georges Barathon was a French wrestler. He competed in the freestyle featherweight event at the 1920 Summer Olympics.
