= Sabarmati Marathon =

Former marathon in Ahmedabad, India

- Logo for Sabarmati Marathon 2013
- Date: January–February
- Location: Ahmedabad
- Event type: Road
- Distance: Marathon, half marathon
- Established: 2010
- Edition: 5
- Website: sabarmatimarathon.net

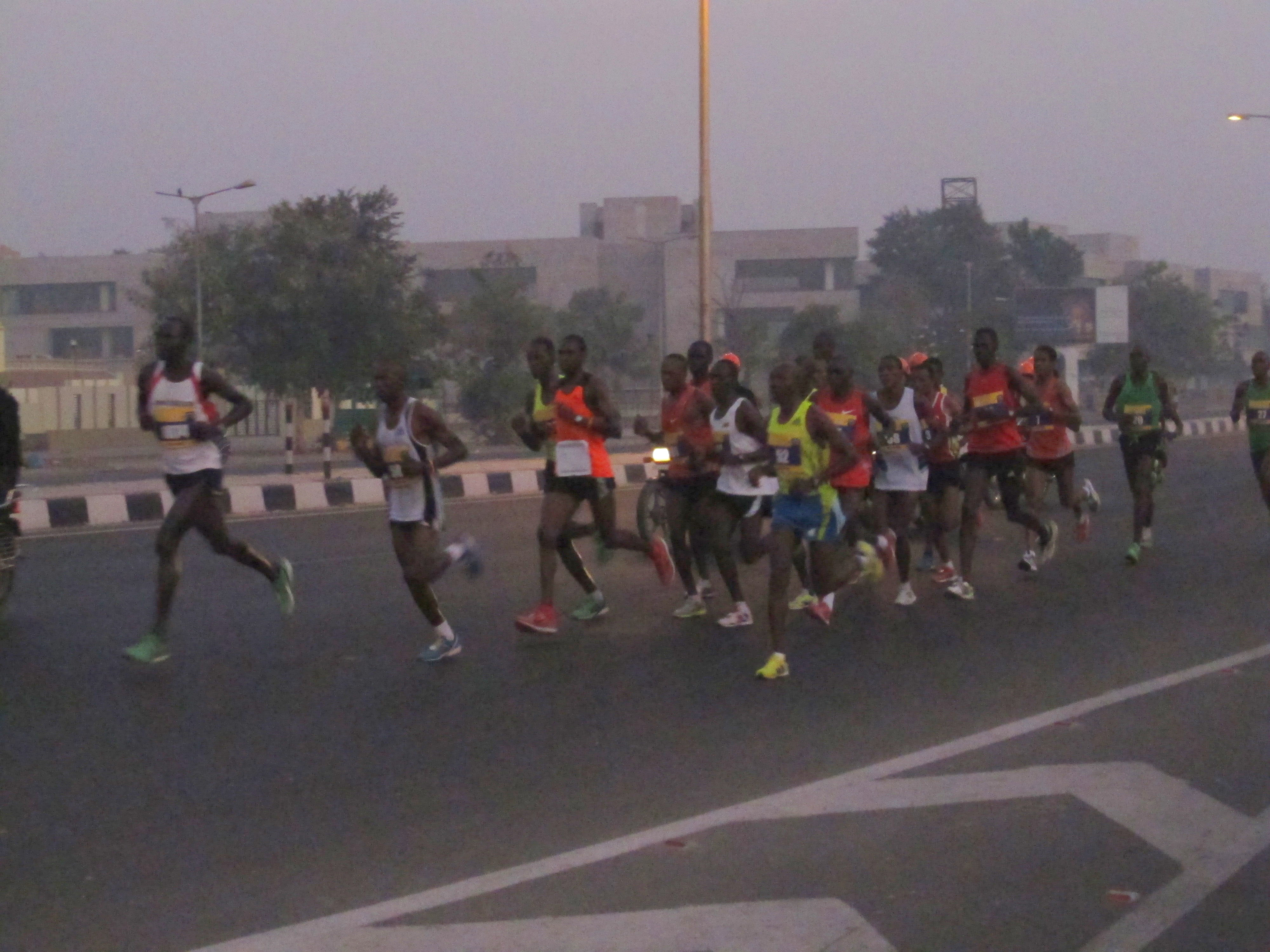
Participants in 2011

Sabarmati Marathon was an annual marathon foot-race held in Ahmedabad. It was held in January and February from 2010 to 2015. It attracted a large number of local and foreign participants.

== Marathon ==
Sabarmati Marathon was organized by Ahmedabad Municipal Corporation in association with Amdavad Distance Runners. It had five categories: full marathon, half marathon, 7 km dream run, 5 km run for visually challenged persons and 5 km wheelchair run.

== History ==
In 2011, more than 8000 persons, including 73 foreigners, participated in the event.

In the 3rd edition held on 6 January 2013, 15,689 runners, including foreign athletes took part. 528 participated in the full marathon, 1934 participated in the half marathon and 13,157 participated in the 7km dream run. 53 participated in 5km run for visually challenged persons while 17 in 5km wheelchair run. A Cyclothon was also organized on 27 January 2013.

The fourth edition of the marathon was organized on 5 January with the cyclothon being held on 19 January 2014. Around 17000 people participated in the event that year.

The fifth and last edition of the event was held on 15 February 2015 in which around 7000 people participated.

In 2017, Adani Ahmedabad Marathon inaugurated which replaced the Sabarmati Marathon.

== Past winners ==
Key: Course record

Edition	Year	Men's winner	Time	Women's winner	Time
1st	2010	Tesfaye Girma Bekele (ETH)	2:35:00	Biruktayit Eshetu (ETH)	2:35:53
2nd	2011	Philemon Rotich (KEN)	2:12:02	Gadise Fita Megersa (ETH)	2:38:54
3rd	2013	Wubishet Girum Zewde (ETH)	2:14:26	Jacquline Kiplimo (KEN)	2:36:57
4th	2014	Shadrack Kipkogey (KEN)	2:14:18	Kiplimo Jacquline Nyetipei (KEN)	2:45:46
5th	2015	Melaku Belachew Bizuneh (ETH)	2:13:43	Berhan Aregawi Gebremicha (ETH)	2:39:11
