= Vadodara Marathon =

Road running event in Gujarat, India

- Logo of Vadodara International Half Marathon
- Date: Early January
- Location: Vadodara, Gujarat, India
- Event type: Road running
- Distance: Marathon, half marathon
- Primary sponsor: MG Motor
- Established: 2009
- Website: Vadodara Marathon

Vadodara Marathon is a run for charity or for purpose organized now annually/bi-annually by an organization based in Vadodara. Accredited to the Association of International Marathon and Distance Races (AIMS), the Vadodara Marathon is the recipient of the AIMS gold medal for 'smallest city, biggest Marathon'.

== Past Marathons ==
=== 2009 ===
Held on 22 November 2009, 31,800 people participated. Flagged off by Gujarat Chief Minister Narendra Modi in presence of Kapil Dev, Milkha Singh, Paresh Rawal, Yusuf Pathan, Irfan Pathan at Navalakhi Ground Vadodara.

=== 2011 ===
Held on 23 January 2011, 30,000 people participated. The event had 3 categories of run: 5 km, 15 km and 21 km; which was flagged off by Gujarat Chief Minister Narendra Modi. For the first time in India, Radio Frequency Identification (RFID) tags were given to each participant in the Marathons

=== 2012 ===
Held on 5 February 2012.

=== 2013 ===
Held on 15 December 2013, 12,000 people participated, including international runners.

=== 2016 ===
Held on 7 February 2016, over 65,000 people registered in the various different categories. The race was flagged off by Gujarat chief minister Anandiben Patel.

=== 2017 ===
Held on 5 February 2017, the race was flagged off by Gujarat Chief Minister Vijay Rupani.

=== 2018 ===
Held on 7 January 2018, over 92,000 people registered in the various different categories. The race was flagged off by Gujarat Chief Minister Vijay Rupani.

=== 2019 ===
Held on 6 January 2019, an estimated 100,000 people registered for the event. The race was flagged off by Chief Minister of Gujarat Vijay Rupani.

=== 2026 ===
13th edition was organized on 1 February 2026, having registration of over 1.1 Lakh.

== List of winners ==
Key: Half marathon

Edition	Year	Men's winner	Time (h:m:s)	Women's winner	Time (h:m:s)
1st	2009	Winner not available	Time not available	Winner not available	Time not available
2nd	2011	Bamzmtebe Kew (ETH)	1:01:02	Berhane Adere (ETH)	1:09:00
3rd	2012	Andualem Belay (ETH)	1:01:20	Yebrgual Melese (ETH)	1:12:28
4th	2013	Asefa Negewo (ETH)	1:03:45	Letebirhan Gebreselasie (ETH)	1:11:37
5th	2016	Samuel Macharia (KEN)	1:02:36	Hannah Gatheru (KEN)	1:11:13
6th	2017	Elam Singh (IND)	2:26:33	Poonam Singh (IND)	3:32:24
7th	2018	Fikre Bekele (ETH)	2:20:12	Alganesh Anjelo (ETH)	2:39:53
8th	2019	Wesley Kiprono (KEN)	2:21:17	Preeti Lala (IND)	3:50:14
9th	2020	Cleophas Chepkwony (KEN)	2:25:30	Nupur Singh (IND)	3:10:25
