= Purma Bannerjee =

Indian sprinter

Personal information
- Full name: Purma C. Bannerjee
- Nationality: Indian
- Born: 1897 Calcutta, British India (now Kolkata, India)
- Died: 1955 (aged 57–58)

Sport
- Sport: Sprinting
- Event: 100 metres

Purma C. Bannerjee (born 1897, death 1955) was an Indian sprinter. Bannerjee would compete at the 1920 Summer Olympics, representing India in two sprinting events. During the opening ceremony, he would be designated as the first flag bearer for the nation.

Bannerjee would first compete in the heats of the men's 100 metres. There, he would place last in his round and would not advance to the quarterfinals of the event. He would then compete in the heats of the men's 400 metres a few days later. He would again place last in his round and would not advance to the quarterfinals of the event.

== Biography ==
Purma C. Bannerjee was born in 1897 in Calcutta, British India (now Kolkata, India). Bannerjee would compete at the 1920 Summer Olympics in Antwerp, Belgium, representing India in two sprinting events. During the opening ceremony of the 1920 Summer Games, he would be designated as the flag bearer for the nation, making him the first Indian Olympian to do so.

Bannerjee's first event would be the men's 100 metres. He would compete in the heats of the event on 15 August against four other competitors. There, he would place last in his round and would not advance to the quarterfinals held in the same day.

His next and last event at the 1920 Summer Games would be the men's 400 metres. He would compete in the heats of the event on 19 August against three other competitors. There, he would record a time of 53.1 seconds and would again place last in his round; he would not advance to the quarterfinals held in the same day.

Olympic Games
Preceded by -	Flagbearer for India; Antwerp 1920	Succeeded by Lal Bokhari
