= Indian Marathon =

Annual marathon in Jaipur, India

- Indian Marathon
- Date: May
- Location: Jaipur, India
- Event type: Road
- Distance: Marathon, Half marathon, Ultra 50 km
- Established: 2017
- Course records: 03:02:13 - (India) Kailash Chand Yadav (Men) (2018); 04:08:18 - (Canada) Loretta Henderson (Women) (2018)
- Website: Official website

Indian Marathon is an annual international marathon event organized in Jaipur, India. It is a road running event that is held every year on second Sunday of May. Due to extremely high temperature in May, Indian Marathon is considered to be the hottest marathon and half marathon in India. The event was established in 2017 by Indian Runners, an umbrella brand of running events across India.

== Course ==
Indian Marathon is held annually during the summer season in Jaipur. Since, average high temperature in Jaipur during the month of May is 40.3 degrees Celsius, the marathon is listed as the hottest active running event in India. The race starts on second Sunday of May from Suresh Gyan Vihar University campus and routed to Mahal Road. The course is stretched to 42.195 km, 21.098 km and 50 km depending upon the type of running event. During the course of event, Mahal Road stays fully closed for traffic, making the event only "No Traffic" running event in Rajasthan.

== Race ==
Indian Marathon has four different race categories which are collectively known as HOT Ultra.

- Ultra 50K - Ultra 50K is a 50 kilometers race event involving high endurance in heat.
- Marathon - A long-distance road race with an official distance of 42.195 kilometers (26.219 miles; 26 miles 385 yards). The hottest marathon in India.
- Half Marathon - A road running event of 21.0975 km (13 mi 192œ yd) half the distance of a marathon.
- Supersonic 10K - A 10 km racing event which is fastest and hottest 10 km road race in India.

Apart from that there is a Monthly Running Challenges which was started in April 2018 with runners from across the country.

== Past results ==
Race	Type	Year	Men's winner	Women's winner
September Challenge	5 km daily for all 30 days of the month	2018	(India) Balraj Kaushik	(India) Asvinee Sanjakumar Sarade
August Challenge	5 km daily for all 31 days of the month	2018	(India) Balraj Kaushik	(India) Bobby Bhatia
July Challenge	5 km daily for all 31 days of the month	2018	(India) Keshav Manik Tahla	(India) Sumita Rathi
June Challenge	5 km daily for all 30 days of the month	2018	(India) Amit Bagra	(India) Anita Janu
May Challenge	5 km daily for all 31 days of the month	2018	(India) Keshav Manik Tahla	(India) Roopal Jadav
300K Challenge	300 km total running in the month of May	2018	(India) Gaurav Karjee	(India) Madhuri Prakash Nimje
April Challenge	5 km daily for all 30 days of the month	2018	(India) Dhanpat Saini	(India) Ekta Awachar
Hot Ultra	Marathon, Half Marathon, 10K	2018	(India) Kailash Chand Yadav	(Canada) Loretta Henderson
