= Patna Marathon =

International-level race in India

- Date: 27 march 2022
- Event type: Road
- Distance: Marathon
- Established: 2021
- Website: www.patnamarathon.co.in

The Patna Half Marathon has been jointly conceptualized by NCC Dte Bihar & Jharkhand and the Department of Art, Youth & Culture (Bihar Government) to commemorate 75 years of India’s Independence (Azadi Ka Amrit Mahotsav) and 50 years of victory in the Indo-Pak war, 1971 (Swarnim Vijay Varsh).

By involving the masses in these celebrations, we will foster national pride in India’s achievements and freedom struggle. The event also aims to promote Patna to the rest of the world, and support Beti Bachao, Beti Padhao, and Nasha Mukt Samaj Abhiyan.

Prohibition, Excise & Registration Department, Bihar and the Tourism Department - Government of Bihar are the title sponsors for the event.

The event is scheduled for 27 March 2022.

== Event categories ==
There are three categories for contestant:

- Victory Run – 21 km
- Freedom Run – 10 km
- Celebration Run – 03 km

== Timings ==
- Victory Run – 5:00 A.M
- Freedom Run – 5:30 A.M.
- Celebration Run - 6:30 A.M.

== Prizes ==
Prizes are to be awarded for:

=== Male and Female categories 21 KM ===
- 1st Prize 2,00,000
- 2nd Prize 1,50,000
- 3rd Prize 1,00,000
- 4th- 6th Prize 50,000
- 7th- 10th Prize 25,000

=== Male and Female categories 10 KM ===
- 1st Prize 1,00,000
- 2nd Prize 75,000
- 3rd Prize 50,000
- 4th- 6th Prize 25,000
- 7th- 10th Prize 10,000

== Organizers ==
Patna Half Marathon 2022 is being organized by NCC directorate Bihar & Jharkhand in association with Govt. of Bihar & its various departments.

NCC Uddan is the financial and operations partner for the event whereas Thinkers and Fillers is the digital partner for the same.
