= Pinkathon =

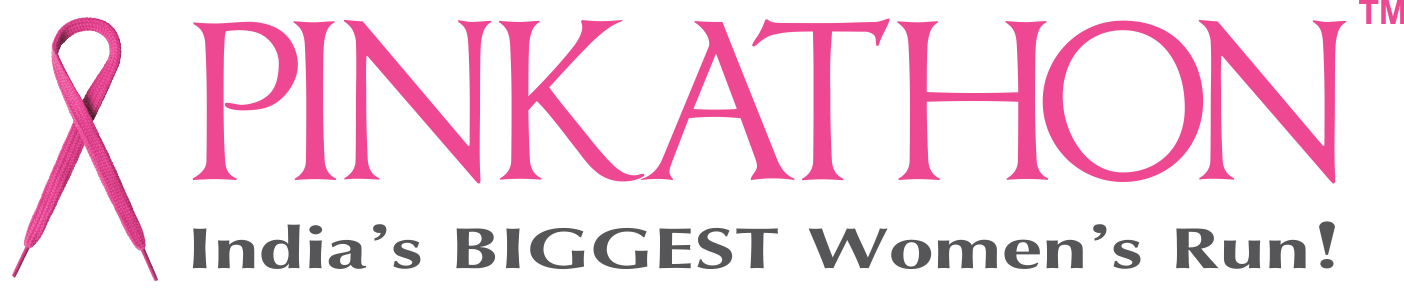
- Pinkathon
- Location: India
- Event type: Road
- Distance: 3km, 5km, 10km , and Half Marathon
- Primary sponsor: Colors
- Established: 2012
- Course records: Women's: 1:23:00 (2015); Supriya Patil
- Website: www.pinkathon.in

The Pinkathon, India's biggest women's run. It was created with the specific purpose of getting more and more women to adopt a fitter lifestyle and to highlight the need for increased awareness about Breast cancer and other health issues that put women's lives at risk. State Bank of India took up the title sponsorship of the Pinkathon in 2014. It was created by Milind Soman.

== History ==
"The Pinkathon is more than a Marathon. It is the seed of change. It is the beginning of a movement carried forward by a growing community of empowered women across India, who share a belief that a healthy family, a healthy nation and a healthy world begins with empowered women. The first step in empowerment is taking control of your own health, respecting yourself and understanding and celebrating the value you bring to your family and society. Empowerment is not a gift of society, it is a gift you give yourself.'"

— Milind Soman

The running revolution took off in India around the time of the 1st Mumbai marathon in 2004. Today almost every Indian city has its version of a distance running event whether 3 km, 5 km, 10 km, and 21 km. The inaugural race, on 16 December 2012 in Mumbai, hosted 2,000 runners. In 2013, it was organised in Bengaluru, Delhi, Pune and Mumbai and had an average participation of between 5000 and 10000 participants. In 2014, it was organised in Chennai and Ahmedabad. Ahmedabad registered a record 14000 participants. In 2015, the Pinkathon was held in 2 additional cities including Hyderabad and Guwahati. In 2019, the Pinkathon was held in Panipat registered a new record with 50000 participants.

== Running ==
The running distance of 10K is gaining popularity all over the world. It is a much shorter distance than the full marathon (42.195 km) or even the half marathon (21.0975 km). The 3K pink ribbon walk for Breast Cancer is a popular category in the event where from 10-year-old girls to women in their 70s can participate. The pink ribbon walk is a category where women and groups come together to celebrate womanhood. In the Pinkathon, women may register for a 21 km, 10 km, 5 km or 3 km run/walk.

The numbers speak volumes. In 2013, the number of women who participated across 4 cities was 12,000. By 2014, the number raised to nearly 50,000, with a 100% increase in participation in each city. Every participant is offered a free health counselling session and medical screening and if over the age of 45years, a free mammogram (see Mammography).

Where performance in the sport of distance running is concerned the Pinkathon winners in the different distance categories display close to state championship timings. The half marathon distance was added in Sept 2014 at Pinkathon Delhi, and is now a part of the Pinkathon in every city. It is the only distance in the Pinkathon that merits a cash prize. All participants get a Finishers medal, attached to which is a tag that entitles them to a free medical check up at a city hospital. All women over 45 years of age can take an appointment for a free mammogram.

== Beyond the marathon ==
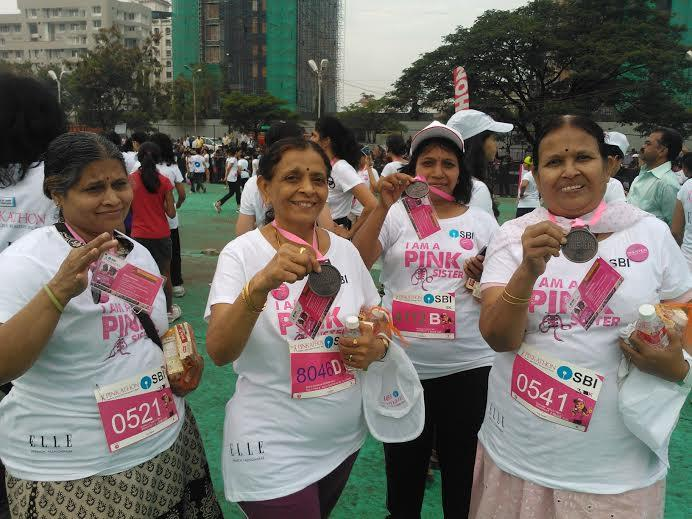
Women of all ages participating in the marathon

The concept of the Pinkathon was created on the premise that women are the key to a healthier and fitter society.

== Route ==
The event day in every city starts with the flag off of the 21 km half marathon at 5am, followed by assembly of all other participants at 5.30am. All participants are addressed by an Oncologist (see Oncology) and a Cancer survivor. The traditional warmup is Zumba followed by the flag off of the 10k, 5K and 3k distances. The prize distribution starts at approximately 8am.

Besides prizes for inspiring personalities like the oldest and youngest participant, the prizes for the winners in the four distance categories are all chosen with a view to encouraging different sporting and outdoor activities. There is a cash prize only for the half marathon distance. The fastest finisher so far in the 21 km half marathon is Supriya Patil at the SBIPinkathon Hyderabad 2015 with a time of 1hr 23min.

== Precursor Events ==
=== Cancer Shero Trek ===
A new initiative from United Sisters, the Cancer Shero trek is designed especially for cancer survivors. The concept is to provide a community activity where a person who has withstood the physical and emotional ravages of the disease, has a chance to test themselves in a safe environment surrounded by friends and caregivers.

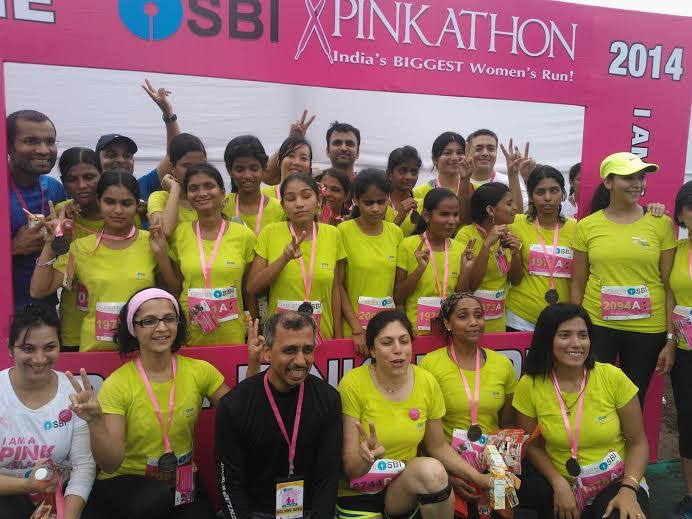
Visually impaired participants completed the marathon with the help of volunteers

=== Visually Impaired Participants ===
In every COLORS Pinkathon, visually impaired girls are encouraged to participate across all three categories 3k, 5k and 10k. In order to prepare them for the main day there are special unique training sessions designed for them. As required, with every visually impaired participant, a sighted runner volunteers to train with them and run alongside them at the event. All visually impaired runners and their sighted partners are presented with medals in Braille, inscribed with the words 'I run, I inspire'.

=== Baby Wearing Mothers ===
In 2015, the Pinkathon started with a new concept where Pregnant women, and women with babies strapped to their bodies, participated in Baby Wearing Walks to train for and eventually participate in the event. The concept of baby wearing promotes a closer emotional bond between mother and child, increases the baby's exposure to the mother's lifestyle and environment in a safe and secure way and breaks the myth that women have to be constrained by new motherhood.

== Health ==
Though the main focus of the Pinkathon is to get women to understand the value of taking time out to focus on themselves, there are certain issues that are highlighted, such as the need for increased awareness of Breast Cancer. As the Pinkathon moves ahead in its journey, other causes will be added that might be specific to each city. There is a need to reiterate the fact that women neglect their health and their focus on their families and jobs very often leaves them with no time or energy to take proper care of themselves. Fear of judgement and the guilt of taking time away from their families stops many women from paying attention to their own well-being. A woman who believes in the value of her own fitness and adopts an active lifestyle focussed on wellness

== Celebrity ambassadors ==
Pinkathon was initiated under the guidance of Milind Soman and hosted by celebrity anchor AK Rahman to promote good health and breast cancer awareness amongst women. Caralisa Monteiro regularly runs the Pinkathon and other marathons as a hobby and also uses her new found love for the sport to raise awareness for breast cancer. Bollywood actress Karisma Kapoor supports a number of charities and has been a goodwill ambassador for Pinkathon 2012 for breast cancer awareness. Actress Bipasha Basu expressed support for Pinkathon, a run for breast cancer awareness, terming it an important platform that encourages women. Apart from Bipasha Basu, other celebrities like Lisa Haydon, and Gul Panag have also promoted the cause. The key to the success of the Pinkathon, besides the uniqueness of the event, are the Ambassadors of Pinkathon. Though each participant is regarded as an ambassador of health, the official Pinkathon Ambassadors have created a buzz and a goodwill about the event that is unparalleled in the history of cause promotion. Each Ambassadors passionately believes that fit women will lead fit families and that women must be encouraged to run, to stop neglecting themselves and above all take their rightful place as inspiring voices in society. In 2015, one of the ambassadors, Giridhar Kamath, ran barefoot from Bengaluru to Chennai to promote the Pinkathon Chennai, talking to villagers about breast cancer along the way. In 2016, Milind Soman visited Kathmandu, Nepal to promote the Pinkathon Kathmandu. Later on 24 February 2017 Nepal observed its first Pinkathon which was held in Kathmandu.

== Charity involvement ==
Though the Pinkathon itself is not a charity run, the United Sisters Foundation actively campaigns for and provides a platform for NGOs, corporates and individuals to raise funds for organisations like WCI - TATA Memorial Hospital, Adyar Cancer Centre and Ushalakshmi Breast cancer Foundation, who work with underprivileged women with cancer. Corporates who make donations to partner foundations can have their employees participate in the Pinkathon without paying the registration fees. The Pinkathon has been created to drive awareness on social causes. Even though it is not a fund raiser, all participants are encouraged to raise money through the Pinkathon, which is donated directly to the Women's Cancer Initiative in Mumbai, as well as other NGO's across the country. Through campaigning with corporates who support the Pinkathon, United Sisters Foundation has raised more than Rs 60 Lacs so far towards treatment of underprivileged women with cancer and has facilitated, through their partners, offers of free breast screenings and bone density tests for thousands of women.

== Race day photos ==
At several events, Pinkathon partners with marathon photography and technology provider SplitSecondPix to cover the photography for the runners. The facility enables participants to easily find their running photos directly on basis of their Bib number.
