= Henry Inman (wrestler) =

British wrestler

- Born: 2 November 1886
- Died: 12 March 1967 (aged 80)

Henry Inman (2 November 1886 – 12 March 1967) was a British wrestler. He competed in the freestyle featherweight event at the 1920 Summer Olympics.
