= Sam Gerson =

American wrestler

Samuel Gerson
- Gerson around college age, with Penn sweater

Personal information
- Born: November 30, 1895 Tymky, Poltava Oblast, Russian Empire
- Died: September 30, 1972 (aged 76) Philadelphia, Pennsylvania, U.S.

Sport
- Country: United States
- Sport: Freestyle and Folkstyle
- College team: Penn
- Club: Meadowbrook Club
- Team: USA
Medal record
Men's freestyle wrestling
Representing the United States
Olympic Games
Silver medal – second place	1920 Antwerp	60 kg

Samuel Norton Gerson (November 30, 1895 – September 30, 1972) was a Ukrainian-born American civil engineer, wrestler, and 1920 Olympic silver medalist, who helped found several Olympic and civic organizations. He immigrated to the United States when he was 11 years old. He was born in Tymky, Poltava Oblast, Russian Empire, and died in Philadelphia, Pennsylvania.

== Education ==
Gerson worked to support himself during high school, and initially knowing very little English, attended night school to learn the language. He adjusted well to his new school and neighborhood, and while he participated with the chess team, Southern High School, which he attended in South Philadelphia, won an unprecedented three chess championships. He participated in many athletic teams and was captain of his school baseball team.

His athletic achievements and leadership as Captain of the wrestling team allowed him to receive a partial scholarship based on sports participation and academics to the University of Pennsylvania School of Engineering in 1916.

According to the 1920 yearbook, Gerson was also a member of the Civil Engineering Society while in college, and was Captain of the Chess Team his Senior year. After college graduation in 1920 where he received a degree in chemical engineering, he worked as a chemical engineer, retiring as a civil engineer.

== College titles ==
In 1920 while a junior at the University of Pennsylvania, Gerson won the Eastern Intercollegiates and the Middle Atlantic Wrestling Championships. Outside of his Olympic medal, they were the most significant titles of his competitive wrestling career. It was most likely his win in the bantamweight class at the Middle Atlantic Amateur Athletic Association Wrestling Championship that led to a berth on the U.S. Olympic Team.

== Olympic medal ==
He competed in the 1920 Summer Olympics, for the United States. He won the Olympic silver medal in the freestyle wrestling featherweight class after losing the final to Charles Ackerly. According to one source, Gerson may have left with a bad feeling about the games after allegedly being told by an official after the match that he may have been unfairly prejudiced because he was Jewish.

After the Olympics he traveled to Romania in order to bring his parents and three additional family members back to America where they could establish new lives in Philadelphia. They had been living in Bucharest, Romania.

== Civic work ==
He organized the Philadelphia Intercollegiate Chess League in 1943, and as a tribute to return the favor of his own sports scholarship, he became one of the organizers of Philadelphia's Maccabi Sports Club which helped provide the experience of athletics to a larger number of his own religious community. Dr. George Eisen of Nazareth College included Gerson on his list of Jewish Olympic Medalists in the International Jewish Sports Hall of Fame.

== Founded olympic societies ==
He was the founder of the United States Olympian Society, an organization of former Olympic athletes. Believing the Olympics could foster peaceful relations between nations, around 1945 he was also instrumental in starting a similar global organization, Olympian International – later the World Olympians Association. Gerson also served as historian of the U.S. Olympians and spent much of his time collecting data on former athletes. Continuing a role in sports, he was also Chairman of the Middle Athletic States Amateur Athletic Union (AAU).

Gerson had been a Mason and a member of Beth Zion-Beth Israel Congregation. After his death from a heart attack at Philadelphia's Hahnemann Hospital on September 30, 1972, he was buried at the Mount Sharon Cemetery in Springfield, Pennsylvania, ten miles East of Philadelphia where he lived most of his life. He was survived by his wife, the former Malca Mitchell, three sons, a daughter and nine grandchildren. A worker for international peace through athletics, one source believed his death by heart attack may have been partly precipitate by his grief over the Munich Massacre of 11 members of the Israeli Olympic team, many being wrestlers, at the 1972 Summer Olympics by members of the Black September organization.

== Honors ==
In February 2001, Sam was recognized for his outstanding accomplishments by being inducted into the Eastern Intercollegiate Wrestling Association Hall of Fame. In 2006, he was inducted into the International Jewish Sports Hall of Fame, and the Philadelphia Jewish Sports Hall of Fame.

== See also ==
- List of select Jewish wrestlers
