= Charles Ackerly =

American wrestler (1898–1982)

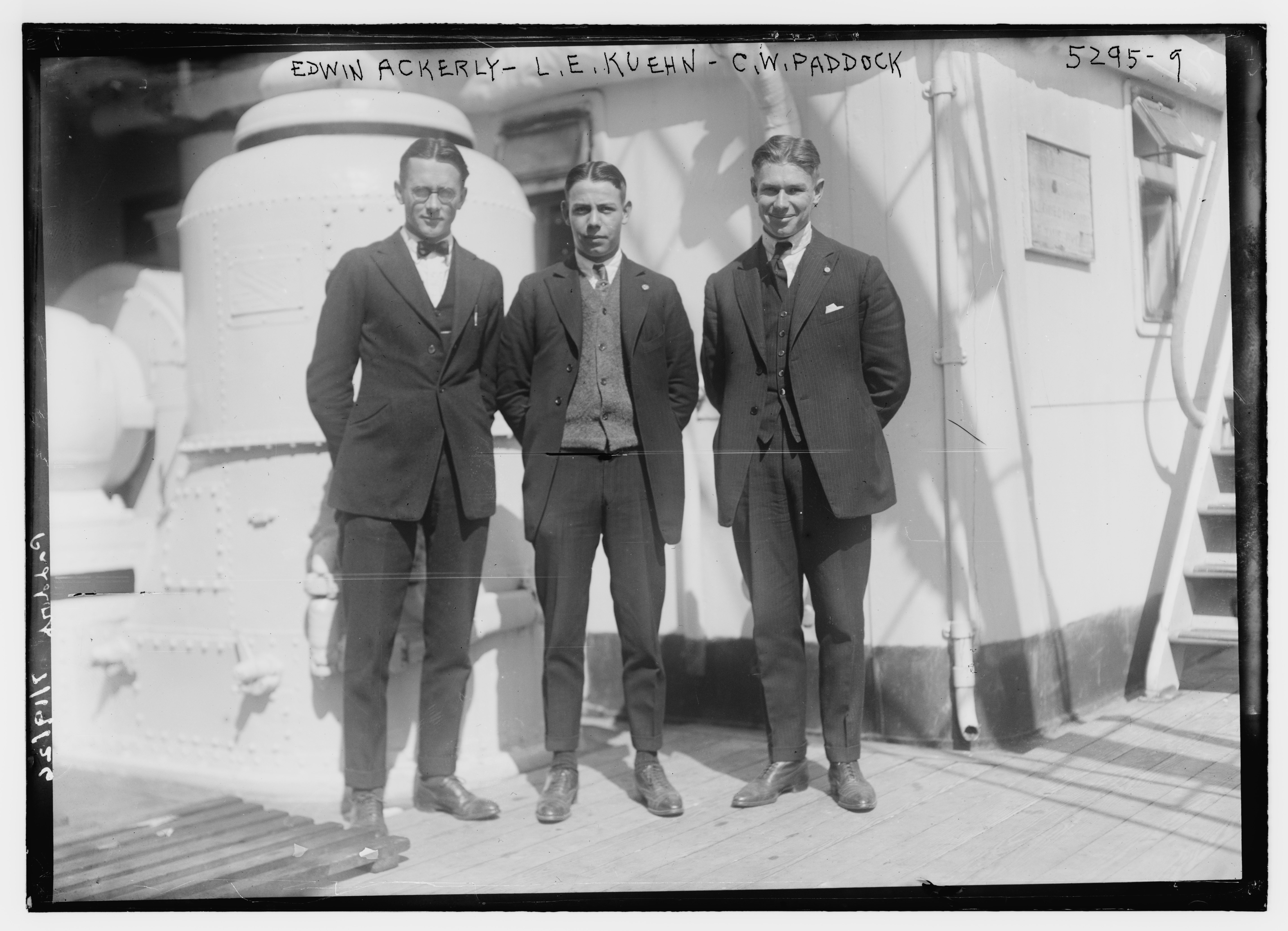
- Ackerly pictured far left with diver Louis Kuehn (center), and track star CW Paddock (far right), all 1920 Olympians

Personal information
- Born: January 3, 1898 Cuba, New York, U.S.
- Died: August 16, 1982 (aged 84) Clearwater, Florida, U.S.
- Education: Cornell University; Detroit School of Law
- Occupations: Attorney (Detroit, Michigan)
- Weight: 60 kg (132 lb) (At Olympics)

Sport
- Country: United States
- Sport: Wrestling
- Events: Freestyle and Folkstyle
- College team: Cornell
- Coached by: Walter O'Connel (Cornell)
Medal record
Men's freestyle wrestling
Representing the United States
Olympic Games
| Gold medal – first place | 1920 Antwerp | 60 kg |

Charles Edwin "Charley" Ackerly (January 3, 1898 – August 16, 1982) was an American wrestler who competed for Cornell University and participated in the 1920 Antwerp Olympics where he won a gold medal in the Men's Freestyle featherweight Division.

== Early life and family ==
Charles "Charley" E. Ackerly was born one of four siblings on January 3, 1898 in Cuba, New York to Charles A. Ackerly and Ida Prentis Ackerly. Charley's father was a prominent Allegany County banker who lived in Cuba throughout his life, where he ascended to the Presidency of Cuba National Bank and later served as a Chairman of the Board. A civic leader in Cuba, he served on the Chamber of Commerce, and was a President and treasurer of Cuba Village.

Charles Edwin Junior attended Cuba High School where he graduated in 1916. A distinguished student, he was his High School's Class president and excelled in academics as the Class valedictorian. Charles Jr. continued to reside in Cuba during his years at Cornell University.

== Cornell University ==
Charles Edwin was a 1920 graduate of Cornell University where he competed for the Cornell Big Red wrestling team under Coach Walter O'Connell and captained the team in his Senior year. At Cornell, he was a member of the Kappa Delta Rho fraternity and Sphinx Head Society. Wrestling at 119 pounds, Ackerly won an Eastern Intercollegiate Wrestling Association title in 1919 by defeating the University of Pennsylvania's Sam Gerson.

== 1920 Olympics ==
He competed for the United States in wrestling at the 1920 Summer Olympics held in Antwerp, Belgium in the freestyle featherweight division, defeating Sam Gerson to win the gold medal. Ackerly had to drop weight to wrestle with the U.S. Olympic team, and competed at the Olympics at 60 kg, around 132 pounds. He was the only American wrestler to win gold during the 1920 Olympics, and was given a enthusiastic reception in his hometown of Cuba, New York following his return from Antwerp.

After his wrestling career, he graduated the Detroit School of Law, and worked as a lawyer in Detroit, Michigan before retiring to Clearwater, Florida around 1968.

=== Marriage ===
Ackerly married Hellen Eunice Keller in 1937. She moved with him from Detroit to Clearwater, Florida when he retired there around 1968. Helen pre-deceased Charles in April, 1978.

=== Honors ===
Ackerly was inducted into the Helms Foundation National Amateur Wrestling Hall of Fame in 1960 and Cornell's Hall of Fame in 1981.

Charles Edwin Ackerly died August 16, 1982 in Clearwater, Florida where he had retired around 1968, and was buried in his birthplace of Cuba, New York, at Cuba Cemetery.
