= Kashmir International Half Marathon =

2015 running event in India

- Date: 13 September 2015
- Location: Srinagar, Jammu and Kashmir, India
- Distance: Half Marathon
- Primary sponsor: BIG FM 92.7
- Established: 2015

Kashmir International Half Marathon, organized by Big FM, saw more than 30,000 people from India and other countries participate in the event which was held in Srinagar on 13 September 2015.

== Events and theme ==
According to organizers, the Marathon is aimed to promote awareness in local people towards social issues like saving Dal Lake, fighting drug abuse, and keeping the city clean along with promoting traffic awareness, and respect for senior citizens and women.

== Participants ==
More than 15,000 people took part in the Marathon; most of the foreign participants were from Kenya. Former Chief Minister of Jammu and Kashmir Omar Abdullah also participated in the Marathon.

== Incidents ==
Disruption was caused when the Kashmiri youth raised "Pro-Freedom" and Pro-Pakistan slogans and clashed with the Indian police during the marathon. Incidents like eve-teasing, and stone pelting were also witnessed. Some masked youth raised Pakistani flags at the Kashmir university campus. For eve-teasing and stone pelting incidents, 12 people were arrested by Indian police.

== See also ==
- Jammu and Kashmir cricket team
