= Angul Stadium =

Cricket ground in Angul, Odisha, India

- Interactive map of Angul Stadium
- Location: Angul, Odisha
- Country: India
- Coordinates: 20°50′10″N 85°05′51″E
- Establishment: 1999
- Capacity: 2,000
- Owner: Government of Odisha
- Operator: Football Association of Odisha; Odisha Cricket Association
- Tenants: Odisha football team Odisha women's football team Odisha cricket team Odisha women's cricket team
- As of 18 May 2018; Source: CricInfo

Angul Stadium is a cricket ground in Angul, Odisha. The ground was established in 1999 and is owned by Angul District Sports Association. The ground was constructed with support from the National Aluminum Company Ltd and Sports Department, Government of Orissa. The stadium has a capacity of 2,000 people with a pavilion which includes a VIP gallery and club house.

The stadium has hosted a first-class matches when Orissa cricket team and Assam cricket team as the match was drawn in 1999. The stadium has hosted a List A match also between Orissa cricket team and Assam cricket team as the match was drawn in 1999.

== Facilities ==
- Club house
- Cricket pitch
- Gallery
- Football ground
- 400 meter track
