= Jaipur Marathon =

Annual international marathon

- Date: 13 March 2022 (13th Edition)
- Location: Jaipur, Rajasthan, India
- Distance: Marathon
- Primary sponsor: AU Small Finance Bank
- Established: 2010
- Website: Jaipur Marathon

The Jaipur Marathon is an annual international marathon held in Jaipur, India. The event happens each year on a Sunday in February and is one of the largest marathons in Asia. It is also the largest mass participation sporting event on the continent. It started in 2010.

== History ==
Mukesh Mishra, the director of the Indian Institute of Event Management Research and a fitness enthusiast, is the founder of Jaipur Marathon. The organisers of the event are Sanskriti Yuva Sanstha and World Trade Park, believed that Jaipur would be able to support such a road race in India. The first event was held in 2010.

Since it began, Jaipur Marathon has supported various events and marathon formats. It has been endorsed by socialites, international brand ambassadors, Bollywood celebrities, and athletes like Salman Khan, Rahul Dravid, Akshay Kumar, Farhan Akhtar, Kangana Ranaut, Suniel Shetty, Sonam K Ahuja, Arbaz Khan, Malaika Arora, Milind Soman, Sonika Kaliraman, Dharmendra, Sreesanth, Vivek Oberoi, Akshaye Khanna, Kajal Aggarwal, Mugdha Godse, and Shriya Saran. The Jaipur Marathon route is among the world's ten fastest courses.

Jaipur Marathon was recognized by the World Book of Records as the Largest Running Event in India in 2018 with 80,000 participants in various race categories. The race was also recognized by the Global Conference London as the Best Marathon of India in 2017. It is the only marathon in India where more than 15 world records were made in various categories since its inception.

== Marathon details ==
=== Pre-race activity ===
Two days before the race, a Bib Expo is organized where the runners can collect their running bibs and kit. The Expo carries a range of running-related products to assist runners.

=== Categories ===
The event seven different race categories: marathon (42.195 km), half marathon (21.097 km), IIEMR (10 km), dream run (6 km), youth run (6 km), senior citizens' run (3 km), beti bojh nahi hai run (2 km), and wheel chair run (6 km).

The marathon starts from the South Gate of Ram Niwas Garden, Jaipur. It passes many of the city's iconic locations such as Albert Hall Museum, Kesargarh, Dolls Museum, Tri Murti Circle, Ravindra Manch, Birla Mandir, University of Rajasthan, Kulish Smriti Van, MNIT, World Trade Park, and Jawahar Circle.

=== Ambassadors ===
The event ambassadors for the Jaipur Marathon have been:

- 2010—Salman Khan
- 2011—Salman Khan
- 2012—Akshaye Khanna, Vivek Oberoi, Mugdha Godse, Shriya Saran
- 2013—Akshay Kumar, Rahul Dravid
- 2014—Farhan Akhtar,
- 2015—Arbaaz Khan, Malaika Arora Khan, Sonam Kapoor,
- 2016—Suniel Shetty
- 2017—Kangana Ranaut

The Maharaja of Jaipur H H Maharaja Sawai Padmanabh Singh is the Youth Ambassador of the Jaipur Marathon.

=== Winners ===
Key: Course record Half marathon

Edition	Year	Men's winner	Time (h:m:s)	Women's winner	Time (h:m:s)
1st	2010	Winner not available	Time not available	Winner not available	Time not available
2nd	2011	Winner not available	Time not available	Winner not available	Time not available
3rd	2012	Charles Wachera (KEN)	1:06:56	Teresa Bayisa (ETH)	1:13:39
4th	2013	Charles Wachera (KEN)	1:03:40	Agnes Jepkosgei (KEN)	1:11:12
5th	2014	Charles Wachera (KEN)	1:02:54	Mesirak Bedilu (ETH)	1:13:55
6th	2015	Simon Kiprugut (KEN)	1:02:28	Pauline Mutwa (KEN)	1:11:08
7th	2016	Worku Dires (ETH)	1:03:57	Meseret Gezahegn (ETH)	1:15:20
8th	2017	Ashish Kumar (IND)	2:27:37	Shyamali Sing (IND)	3:05:59
9th	2018	Indrajeet Yadav (IND)	2:36:03	Shyamali Sing (IND)	3:02:32
10th	2019	Ashish Kumar (IND)	2:26:15	Gunjan Khurana (IND)	3:57:32
11th	2020	Japhet Rono (KEN)	2:34:29	Elizabeth (IND)	3:20:06
	2022	Pankaj Dhaka (IND)	2:30:08	Pooja Kumari (IND)	3:21:47
	2023	Sarvesh Kumar (IND)	2:28:11	Pooja (IND)	3:08:13
	2024	Shrawan Kumar (IND)	2:31:04	Chatru (IND)	3:02:19

== Charity ==
The Jaipur Marathon is one of India's largest charity platforms to raise funds for non-profit organizations. NGOs represent issues surrounding civic and community development, disability, education, environment and health, human rights, social services and women, children, and the aged. NGOs use this event as a platform to raise awareness for their work and to directly raise funds. Fundraising is facilitated by an easy-to-use model designed for all groups to raise funds. The Corporate Challenge is a category for companies who wish to sponsor employee teams to participate in events and raise funds. Fundraising is encouraged through donations and contributions received from friends, family, and colleagues in support of the charities and causes chosen by the participant.

=== Sponsors/partners ===
- Title Sponsor: AU Bank Jaipur Marathon
- Associate Sponsor: Rajasthan Tourism
- Timing Partner: Timing Technologies
- Hospitality Partner: Holiday Inn
- Fitness Partner: Rajasthan Royals
- Medical Partner: EHCC Hospital
- Print Partner: Dainik Bhaskar
- Radio Partner: FM Tadka
- Event by: IIEMR - INSTITUTE OF EVENT MANAGEMENT
- Supported by: Jaipur Municipal Corporation & Rajasthan Police
