= Palasia =

- Suburb
- Location in Madhya Pradesh, India Palasia (India)
- Coordinates: 22°43′0″N 75°53′0″E
- Country: India
- State: Madhya Pradesh
- District: Indore

Government
  - Body: Municipal Corporation

Population (2010)
  - Total: 425,000

Languages
  - Official: Hindi
- Time zone: UTC+5:30 (IST)
- PIN: 452001
- Telephone code: 073
- ISO 3166 code: IN-MP
- Vehicle registration: MP-09
- Coastline: 0 kilometres (0 mi)
- Lok Sabha constituency: Indore
- Civic agency: Municipal Corporation
- Website: http://www.imcindore.org

Palasia is a suburb in Indore, the largest city in the Indian state of Madhya Pradesh.

== Services and entertainment ==
Palasia is known as an education hub. It has many coaching institutes for IIT-JEE, medical and school coaching. The old National Highway 3 known as AB road separates Old Palasia and New Palasia.

== Transportation ==
Several City Bus routes serve the area. Palasia has an Indore BRT (iBus) station. Autorickshaws, Metro Taxi, City Van, Tata Magic and various private taxis such as Uber, Meru Cabs, TaxiForSure, jugnoo auto and OlaCabs, are widely available.
