= GiveLife Chennai Marathon =

Indian charity event

The GiveLife Chennai Marathon is one of the two annual marathons in Chennai, India. The Marathon was started in the year 2008 and is being organized by Tamil Maiyam in aid of GiveLife which is a charitable organization.

== 2008 Marg GiveLife Chennai Marathon ==
The event was sponsored by Marg Properties. The project's aim was to raise awareness and collect fund for the charity GiveLife. The Marathon was held on 31 August 2008

== 2009 Idea GiveLife Chennai Marathon ==
The event was sponsored by Idea Cellular and the marathon also had a healthy food fest. The project's aim was to raise awareness among the public on Diabetes and Obesity while the funds collected were donated to Educational Institutes overseen by GiveLife . Over 19000 underprivileged children deprived of good food and education benefited from this marathon. The event was held on 27 September 2009

== 2010 Marg GiveLife Chennai Marathon ==
The event this year is being sponsored by Marg Properties. Buoyed by the success of the past 2 Marathons, the project's aim is to raise awareness and collect fund for the charity GiveLife. The most recent marathon happened on 29 August 2010. The event was organized by Tamil Mayyam in support of Give Life Foundation and had Marg Group as Main sponsor. Marg Chennai Marathon saw a participation of over 70000 people. Santosh Kumar of Maharashtra and Pampa Chanda of West Bengal collected the honours among men and women respectively in the third edition of Chennai Marathon
