= Goa Marathon =

The Goa Marathon is an annual event, now in its ninth year (as of 2020). It has always been organized on the first Sunday of February. In its 2020 edition, organisers said more than 2000 participants ran to help raise funds for charitable causes. The Marathon currently features four races—the 21 kilometre Half Marathon, 10 Kilometre Run, 5 kilometre Dream Run and the School Run for children under 14 and 16 years of age. The 10K Run and the School Run, first started in 2014, are the most popular.

The run is held in Panjim (Panaji), the state-capital of Goa in India, and is flagged off from the Campal Sports Ground on the banks of the River Mandovi. The different runs wind their way through town, and beyond in some cases, starting before dawn.

The first edition of the Goa Marathon was organised in 2012 by students, Sahil Kashyap and Anjali Sharma, of BITS Pilani university along with the El Shaddai Charitable trust, which organizes the event even today. The first edition was held near the campus of BITS Pilani and saw participation not only from the students but also the Indian Army and Indian Navy.

== 2020 Edition ==
El Shaddai Charitable Trust in collaboration with Bank Of Baroda organised the Ninth Edition of the Bank Of Baroda Goa Marathon on 2 February 2020. The Bank Of Baroda Goa Marathon was organized for the cause - Homes for the homeless and Hope for the hopeless children. It aimed to raise awareness and funds to the very urgent need of rescuing and alleviating the suffering of street and abandoned children.

This edition saw over 2000 participants registered across the different categories. The marathon began at the Campal sports ground with the 21 km race going along the Miramar - Dona Paula stretch to the Goa University road up to Goa medical and back the same way to the finish point at the ground. The 10 km followed the same route with the turning point at the Manipal Hospital and the 5 km turning point was at the Kamat supermarket, near the Caranzalem petrol pump.

Runners have registered from different parts of India. Cash prizes were given to the winners of the different categories. The Bank Of Baroda Goa Marathon was primarily sponsored by the Bank of Baroda and had other sponsors on board too namely, South Indian Bank, Borecha, Red Bull, Linc Properties Ltd., Vision Design, Campal Beach Resort, BU, Manipal Hospitals, Real Drinks, Whiteowl, Goan Times, Incredible Goa, Strong by Zumba, Carasid,

== Winners in 2020 ==
Following are the winners in the 2020 event:

Men's Open 21 km: First: Teddy Cardoz

Women's Open 21 km: First: Sapna Patel

Men's Masters 21 km: First: Malcolm Bembridge

Men's Open 10 km; First: Sunil Dharmappa Anveri

Women's Open 10 km: First: Janahavi More

Men's Master 10 km: First: Ajit Kamat

Women's Master 10 km: First: Vidya Athreya

Men's 5 km - First: Nagaraj Divate

Women's 5 km - First: Shreeja Pravin Gad

== Branding ==
In August 2013, it was reported that the Goa tourism department had "zeroed in" on a brand consultant to build a comprehensive "brand strategy for Goa as a tourist destination". The Goa Marathon was one of the four events chosen for this purpose. The Goa Tourism Department and the Goa Athletic Association as well as the Goa Police and the Corporation of the City of Panaji have been partners of the marathon through all its editions.
