= Nilima Ghose =

Indian athlete

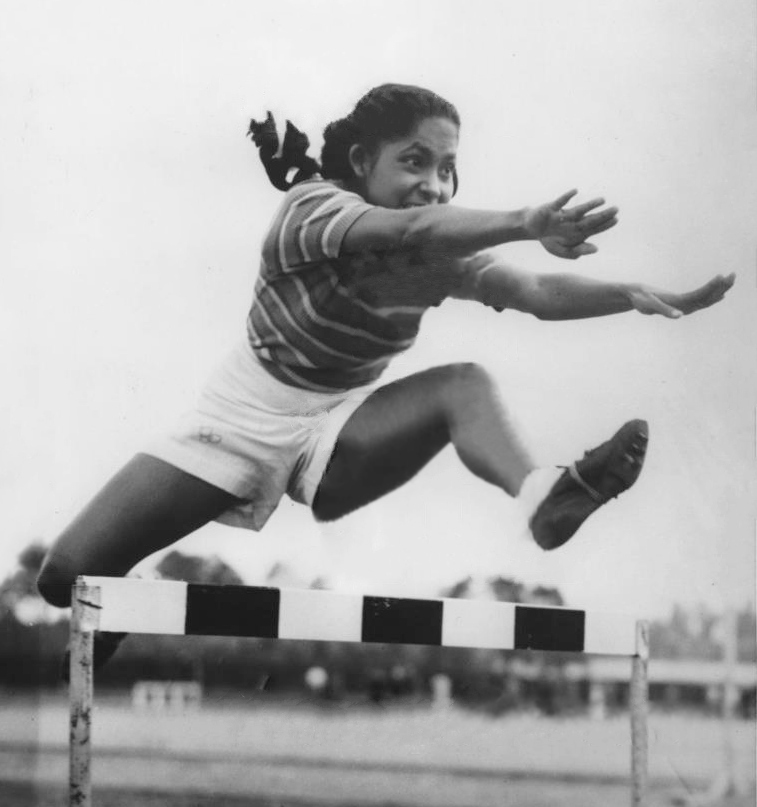
- Ghose at the 1952 Olympics

Personal information
- Born: 15 June 1935 (age 91)

Sport
- Country: India
- Sport: Track and field
- Event(s): Sprint, hurdles

Achievements and titles
- Personal best(s): 100 m – 12.7 (1954); 80 mH – 13.07 (1952)

Nilima Ghose (born 15 June 1935) was an Indian athlete. She was part of the first female team which included Mary D'Souza athlete from India to compete at the Summer Olympics, when she took part in two events at the 1952 Summer Olympics held in Helsinki, Finland.

Ghose was just 17 years old when she competed in her two events at the 1952 Summer Olympics. In the 100 metres, coming last in a time of 13.80 seconds, so she did not qualify for the next round. A couple of days later, Ghose competed in the 80 metres hurdles. She finished fifth nearly two seconds behind the winner of her heat Fanny Blankers-Koen.
