= Kumar Navale =

Indian wrestler

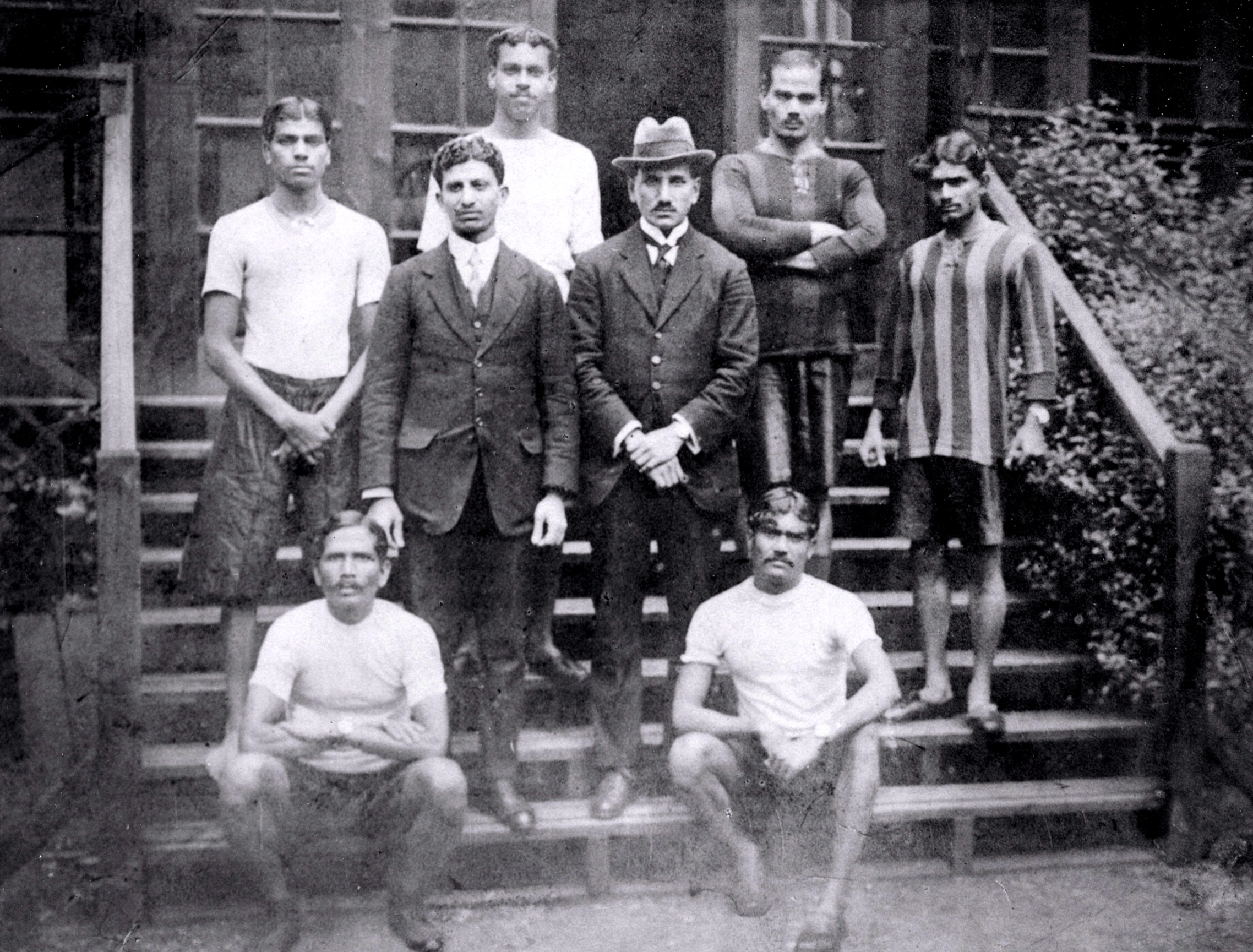
- Navale (top row, arms folded), 1920
- Born: 1897; Bombay, British India
- Died: unknown

Kumar Navale (born 1897, date of death unknown) was an Indian wrestler. He competed in the freestyle middleweight event at the 1920 Summer Olympics.
