= Phadeppa Dareppa Chaugule =

Indian long-distance runner

Personal information
- Nationality: Indian
- Born: 1902-1958; 1902 Sheri Galli, Shahpur, Belgaum, Karnataka, India
- Died: 1952 (aged 49–50)

Sport
- Sport: Long-distance running
- Event: Marathon

Phadeppa Dareppa Chaugule a.k.a. P.D Chaugule (1902–1958) was India's first Olympic marathon runner. He represented India in the 1920 Summer Olympics in Antwerp, and finished 19th with a time of 2 hours 50 minutes 45.2 seconds. He hailed from the town of Belgaum in Karnataka.

== Biography ==
He was born in 1902 or 1905 (no exact records available). His family had a business connected with printing press and agriculture land. PD Chaugule was educated in vernacular (Kannada) medium up to 6th grade and he belonged to Belgaum, Karnataka (then in Bombay Province).

At the beginning of his career he enjoyed wrestling. He even took part in bouts in Akhada (arena), but he couldn't continue the sport after he injured his arm. So he started running.

He was a strict vegetarian, which caused him a lot of problems while traveling in England and Belgium.

== Sporting career ==
In 1919 he took part in the National Marathon organized by the Deccan Gymkhana Club of Pune (then Poona) and after that in some other marathons such as 10 Miles and 1 Mile events at the All-India Open Amateur Athletic Sports Meet in Mumbai (Bombay). He was the winner in all these marathons. On 22 August 1920 he ran the Marathon in the Antwerp Olympics and since that point he became the first Indian Olympic participant.

The house of Karnataka's first Olympian, P D Chaugule is called as Pavananjaya. He received the title Conqueror of the Wind from the local community after on 7 December 1919, after the Antwerp Olimpics, where he was among the top-20.

He died in 1958.

A postal cover was released in 2003 to honour him, and the Chaugule Shield Cricket Tournament is organised by a local Gymkhana club every year in Belagavi.
