= Sadashiv Datar =

Indian long-distance runner

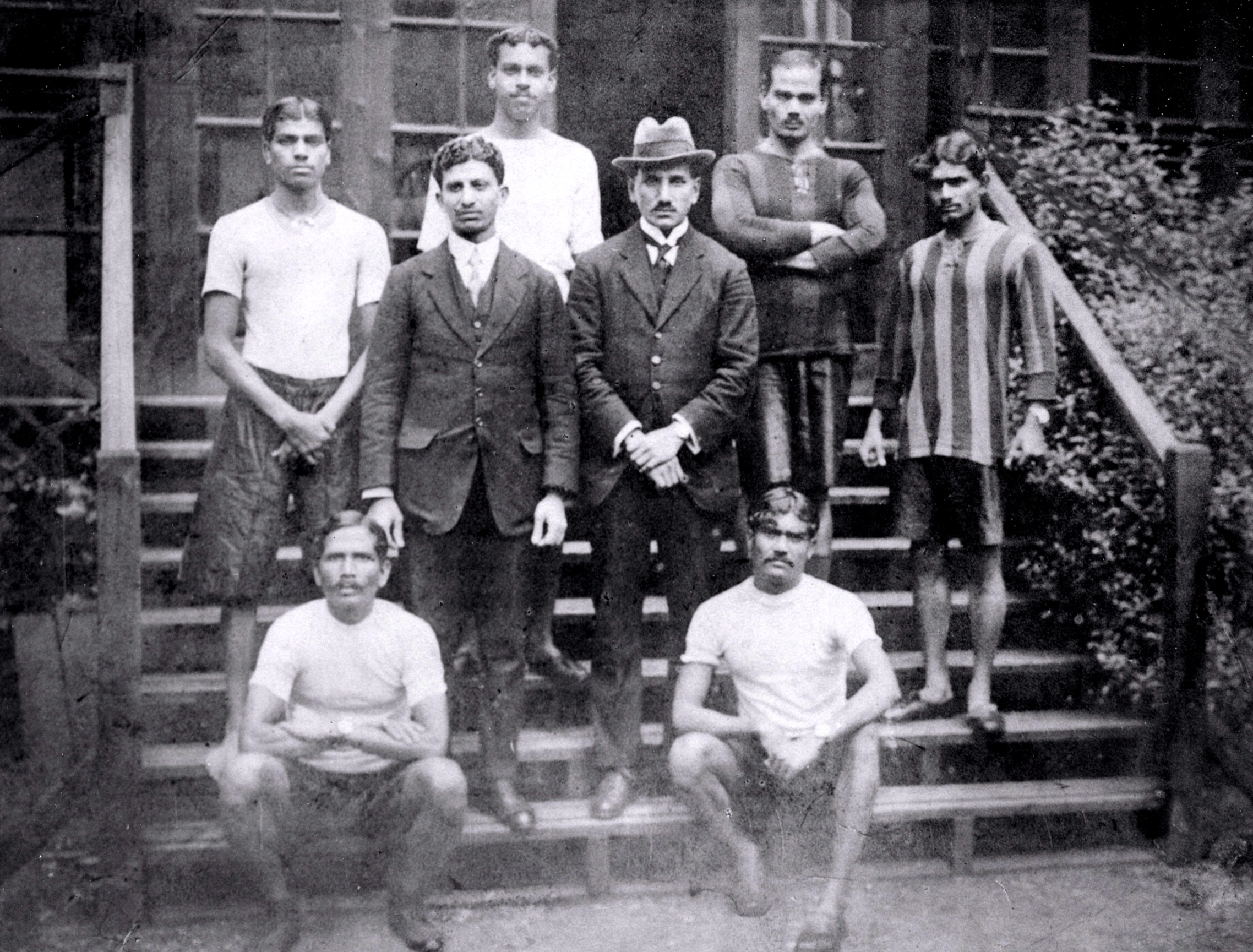
- Indian 1920 Olympic Team, Datar seated on the left

Personal information
- Nationality: Indian
- Born: 1885 Satara, British India
- Died: unknown

Sport
- Sport: Long-distance running
- Event: Marathon

Sadashiv Datar (born 1885, date of death unknown) was an Indian long-distance runner. He competed in the marathon at the 1920 Summer Olympics.
