= Dinkarrao Shinde =

Indian wrestler

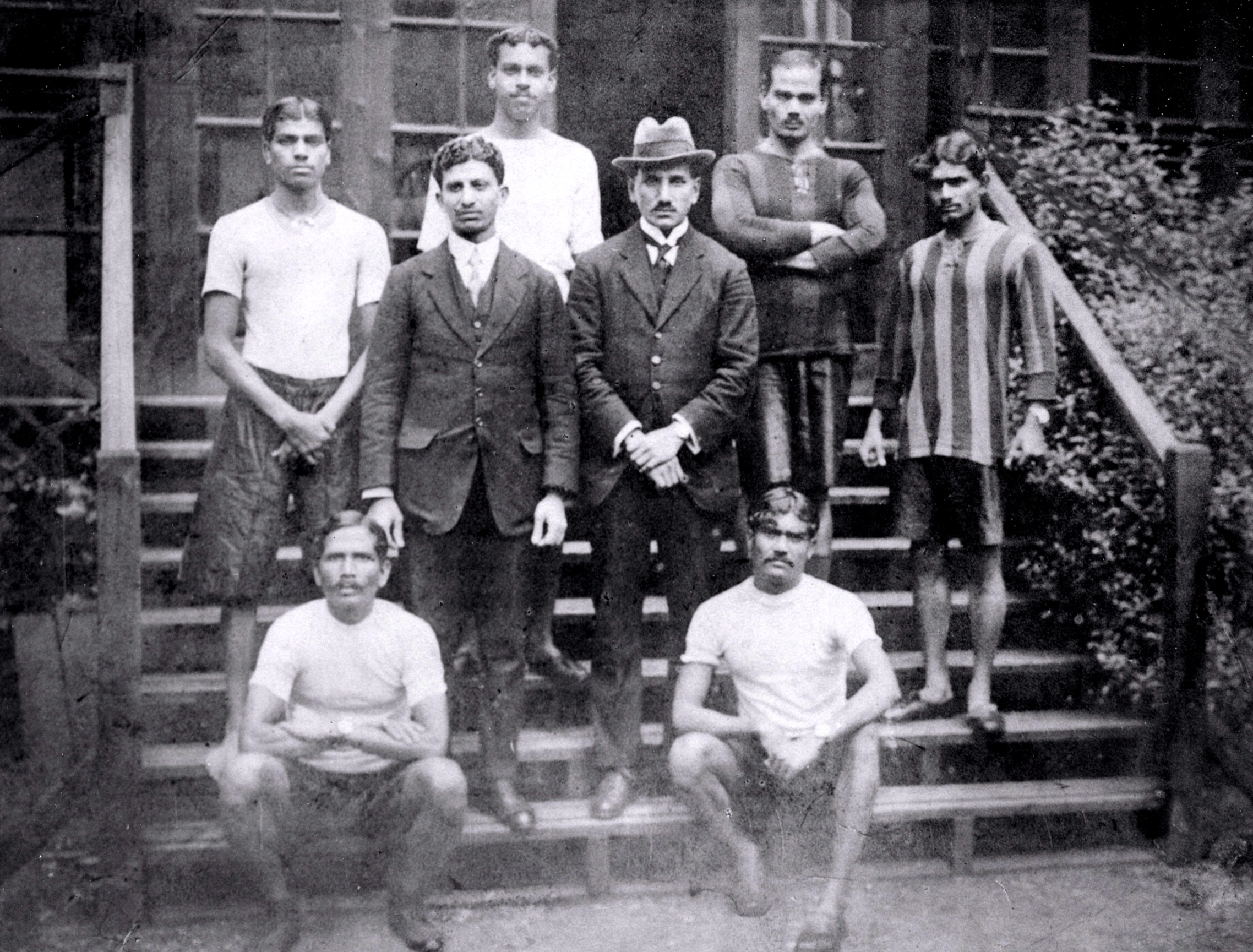
- Dinkarrao Shinde (top row, far left), 1920
- Born: 2 June 1900; Kolhapur, British India
- Died: 18 August 1962 (aged 62); Kolhapur, India

Dinkarrao Shinde (also Dinkkarao, 2 June 1900 – 18 August 1962) was an Indian wrestler. He competed in the freestyle featherweight event at the 1920 Summer Olympics where he finished fourth. He was the first Indian wrestler to win an Olympic bout.
