= Athletics at the 1920 Summer Olympics – Men's long jump =

Men's long jump at the Games of the VII Olympiad
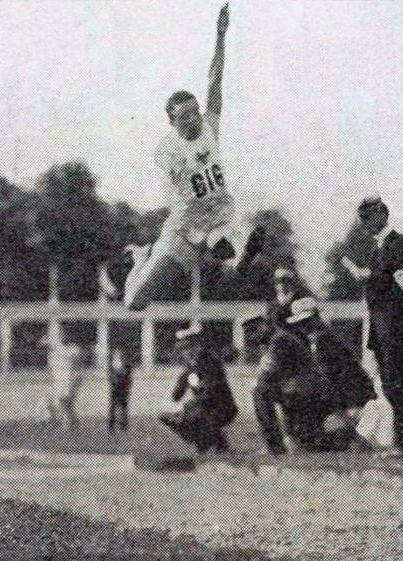
- William Petersson
- Venue: Olympisch Stadion
- Dates: August 17–18, 1920
- Competitors: 29 from 11 nations

Medalists
1st place, gold medalist(s)		William Petersson; Sweden
2nd place, silver medalist(s)		Carl Johnson; United States
3rd place, bronze medalist(s)		Erik Abrahamsson; Sweden

The men's long jump event was part of the track and field athletics programme at the 1920 Summer Olympics. The competition was held on Tuesday, August 17, 1920, and on Wednesday, August 18, 1920. 29 long jumpers from eleven nations competed. No nation had more than 4 runners, suggesting the limit had been reduced from the 12 maximum in force in 1908 and 1912. The event was won by William Petersson of Sweden, the first time an athlete not from the United States took gold in the long jump.

== Background ==
This was the sixth appearance of the event, which is one of 12 athletics events to have been held at every Summer Olympics. None of the jumpers from the pre-war 1912 Games returned. Sol Butler of the United States was the favorite; he had jumped 7.52 metres to win the U.S. Olympic trials, but could only manage 6.60 metres in the qualifying round at the Olympics and did not proceed to the finals.

Belgium, Czechoslovakia, Monaco, and Switzerland each made their first appearance in the event. The United States appeared for the sixth time, the only nation to have long jumpers at each of the Games so far.

== Competition format ==
The 1920 format continued to use the two-round format used in 1900 and since 1908. The number of finalists expanded from 3 in previous Games to 6 in 1920. Each jumper had three jumps in the qualifying round; finalists received an additional three jumps, with qualifying round jumps still counting if the final jumps were not better.

== Records ==
These were the standing world and Olympic records (in metres) prior to the 1920 Summer Olympics.

World record	Peter O'Connor (GBR)	7.61	Dublin, United Kingdom of Great Britain and Ireland	5 August 1901
Olympic record	Albert Gutterson (USA)	7.60	Stockholm, Sweden	12 July 1912

== Schedule ==
Date	Time	Round
Tuesday, 17 August 1920	9:00	Qualifying
Wednesday, 18 August 1920	15:45	Final

== Results ==
The best six long jumpers qualified for the final.

Rank	Athlete	Nation	Qualifying		Final	Best mark
Rank	Athlete	Nation	Distance	Rank	Final	Best mark
1st place, gold medalist(s)	William Petersson	Sweden	6.940	1	7.150	7.150
2nd place, silver medalist(s)	Carl Johnson	United States	6.820	3	7.095	7.095
3rd place, bronze medalist(s)	Erik Abrahamsson	Sweden	6.860	2	7.080	7.080
4	Dink Templeton	United States	6.670	5	6.950	6.950
5	Erling Aastad	Norway	6.620	6	6.885	6.885
6	Rolf Franksson	Sweden	6.730	4	Unknown	6.730
7	Sol Butler	United States	6.600	7	Did not advance	6.600
8	Einar Ræder	Norway	6.585	8	Did not advance	6.585
9	Gösta Bladin	Sweden	6.570	9	Did not advance	6.570
10	Johan Johannesen	Norway	6.565	10	Did not advance	6.565
11	John Merchant	United States	6.500	11	Did not advance	6.500
11	Eugène Coulon	France	6.500	11	Did not advance	6.500
13	William Hunter	Great Britain	6.420	13	Did not advance	6.420
14	Marcel Orfidan	France	6.390	14	Did not advance	6.390
15	Hans Kindler	Switzerland	6.340	15	Did not advance	6.340
16	Eero Lehtonen	Finland	6.285	16	Did not advance	6.285
17	Charles Courtin	France	6.230	17	Did not advance	6.230
18	Gustave De Bruyne	Belgium	6.200	18	Did not advance	6.200
19	Hugo Lahtinen	Finland	6.190	19	Did not advance	6.190
20	Harold Abrahams	Great Britain	6.050	20	Did not advance	6.050
21	Edmond Médécin	Monaco	6.035	21	Did not advance	6.035
22	Charles Lively	Great Britain	5.870	22	Did not advance	5.870
23	Henri Pleger	Luxembourg	5.815	23	Did not advance	5.815
24	Jean Lefèbvre	Belgium	5.790	24	Did not advance	5.790
25	Julien Lehouck	Belgium	5.760	25	Did not advance	5.760
26	František Šretr	Czechoslovakia	5.550	26	Did not advance	5.550
27	Charles Guézille	France	5.485	27	Did not advance	5.485
28	Paul Hammer	Luxembourg	5.450	28	Did not advance	5.450
29	Nicolas Kanivé	Luxembourg	5.415	29	Did not advance	5.415
—	Gustave Remouet	France	DNS	—	Did not advance	—
—	Alexis Soulignac	France	DNS	—	Did not advance	—

== Sources ==
- Belgium Olympic Committee (1957). Olympic Games Antwerp 1920: Official Report (in French).
- Wudarski, Pawel (1999). "Wyniki Igrzysk Olimpijskich" (in Polish).
