= Athletics at the 1912 Summer Olympics – Men's triple jump =

Men's triple jump at the Games of the V Olympiad
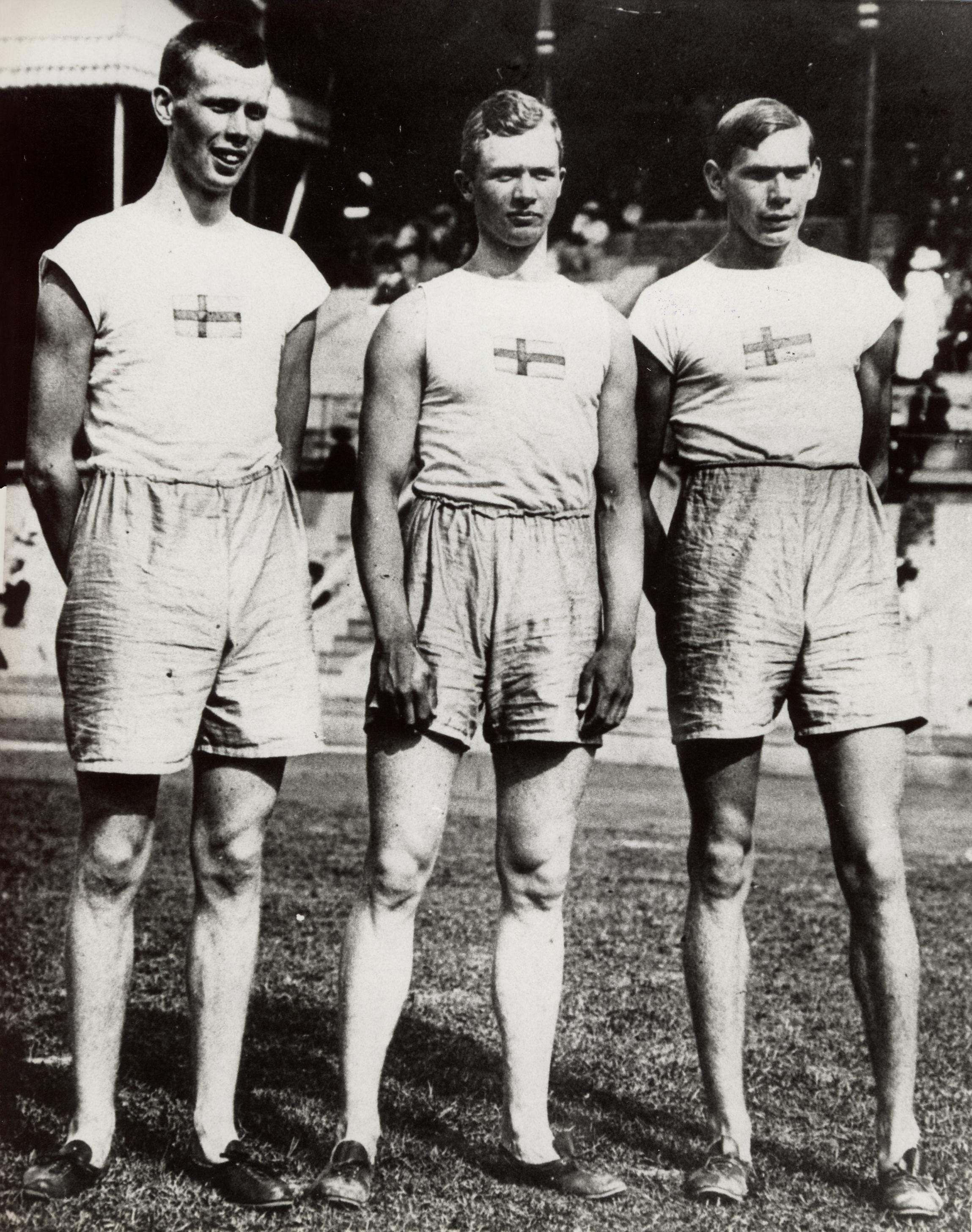
- Left-right: Gustaf Lindblom, Georg Åberg, Erik Almlöf at the 1912 Olympics
- Venue: Stockholm Olympic Stadium
- Date: July 15, 1912
- Competitors: 20 from 8 nations
- Winning distance: 14.76

Medalists
1st place, gold medalist(s)		Gustaf Lindblom; Sweden
2nd place, silver medalist(s)		Georg Åberg; Sweden
3rd place, bronze medalist(s)		Erik Almlöf; Sweden

The men's triple jump, also known as the hop, step, and jump, was a track and field athletics event held as part of the Athletics at the 1912 Summer Olympics programme. The competition was held on Monday, July 15, 1912. Twenty athletes from eight nations competed. NOCs could enter up to 12 athletes. The event was won by Gustaf Lindblom of Sweden, the nation's first medal in the men's triple jump. Georg Åberg and Erik Almlöf also medaled for Sweden, completing a sweep—previously accomplished twice by the United States in 1900 and 1904.

== Background ==
This was the fifth appearance of the event, which is one of 12 athletics events to have been held at every Summer Olympics. Four jumpers from 1908 returned: bronze medalist Edvard Larsen of Norway, fourth-place finisher Calvin Bricker of Canada, fifth-place finisher Platt Adams of the United States, and also-competed Juho Halme of Finland. The top jumpers in the world, the brothers Tim Ahearne (1908 Olympic gold medalist) and Dan Ahearn (who set the world record in 1911), were not present.

Austria made its first appearance in the event. The United States competed for the fifth time, having competed at each of the Games so far.

== Competition format ==
The competition was described as two rounds at the time, but was more similar to the modern divided final. All athletes received three jumps initially. The top three after that received an additional three jumps to improve their distance, but the initial jumps would still count if no improvement was made.

== Records ==
These were the standing world and Olympic records (in metres) prior to the 1912 Summer Olympics.

World record	Dan Ahearn (GBR)	15.52	New York, United States	30 May 1911
Olympic record	Tim Ahearne (GBR)	14.92	London, United Kingdom of Great Britain and Ireland	25 July 1908

No new world or Olympic records were set during the competition.

== Schedule ==
Date	Time	Round
Monday, 15 July 1912	14:00	Qualifying; Final

== Results ==
Rank	Athlete	Nation	1	2	3	4	5	6	Distance
1st place, gold medalist(s)	Gustaf Lindblom	Sweden	14.74	14.76	14.20	X	14.35	14.32	14.76
2nd place, silver medalist(s)	Georg Åberg	Sweden	13.58	13.90	14.51	X	14.03	X	14.51
3rd place, bronze medalist(s)	Erik Almlöf	Sweden	X	13.46	14.17	X	13.85	14.10	14.17
4	Erling Vinne	Norway	13.63	14.14	13.34	Did not advance			14.14
5	Platt Adams	United States	13.72	14.09	X	Did not advance			14.09
6	Edvard Larsen	Norway	13.27	13.90	14.06	Did not advance			14.06
7	Hjalmar Ohlsson	Sweden	14.01	13.87	13.91	Did not advance			14.01
8	Nils Fixdal	Norway	13.96	13.58	13.66	Did not advance			13.96
9	Charles Brickley	United States	13.88	13.84	13.77	Did not advance			13.88
10	Gustaf Nordén	Sweden	13.81	12.76	X	Did not advance			13.81
11	Johan Halme	Finland	13.79	13.43	13.51	Did not advance			13.79
12	Inge Lindholm	Sweden	13.14	13.57	13.74	Did not advance			13.74
13	Edward Farrell	United States	X	13.42	13.57	Did not advance			13.57
14	Otto Bäurle	Germany	13.12	X	13.52	Did not advance			13.52
15	Gustav Krojer	Austria	12.90	13.45	12.95	Did not advance			13.45
15	Patrik Ohlsson	Sweden	12.98	13.37	13.45	Did not advance			13.45
17	Skotte Jacobsson	Sweden	13.33	X	12.71	Did not advance			13.33
18	Calvin Bricker	Canada	13.25	—	—	Did not advance			13.25
19	Timothy Carroll	Great Britain	X	12.54	12.56	Did not advance			12.56
20	Arthur Maranda	Canada	12.53	12.07	12.25	Did not advance			12.53

== Sources ==
- Bergvall, Erik, ed. (1913). The Official Report of the Olympic Games of Stockholm 1912. Translated by Adams-Ray, Edward. Stockholm: Wahlström & Widstrand.
- Wudarski, Pawel (1999). "Wyniki Igrzysk Olimpijskich" (in Polish).
