= Athletics at the 1920 Summer Olympics – Men's high jump =

Men's high jump at the Games of the VII Olympiad
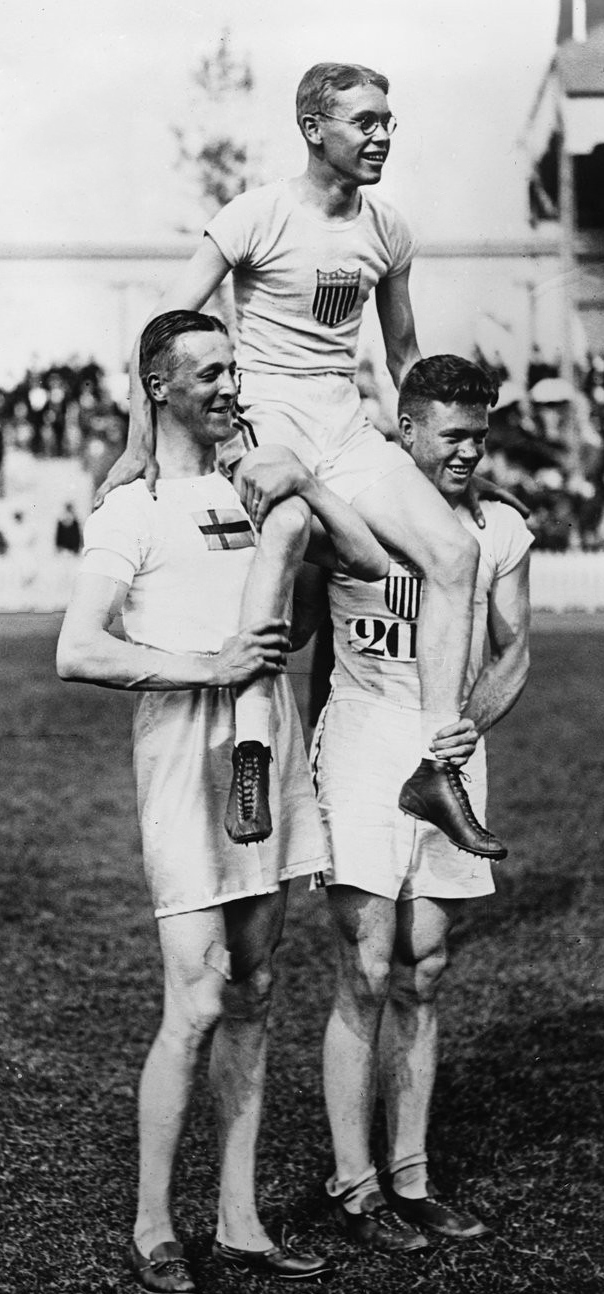
- Left-right: Bo Ekelund, Richmond Landon and Harold Muller at the 1920 Olympics
- Venue: Olympisch Stadion
- Dates: 15–17 August 1920
- Competitors: 22 from 9 nations
- Winning height: 1.936 OR

Medalists
1st place, gold medalist(s)		Richmond Landon; United States
2nd place, silver medalist(s)		Harold Muller; United States
3rd place, bronze medalist(s)		Bo Ekelund; Sweden

The men's high jump event was part of the track and field athletics programme at the 1920 Summer Olympics. The competition was held from Sunday 15 to Tuesday 17 August 1920. 22 high jumpers from nine nations competed. No nation had more than 4 jumpers, suggesting the limit had been reduced from the 12 maximum in force in 1908 and 1912. The event was won by Richmond Landon of the United States, the nation's sixth consecutive victory in the men's high jump. The American team also took silver, with Harold Muller finishing second. Sweden won its first medal in the event with Bo Ekelund's bronze.

== Background ==
This was the sixth appearance of the event, which is one of 12 athletics events to have been held at every Summer Olympics. Returning finalists from the 1912 Games were ninth-place finisher Timothy Carroll and eleventh-place finisher Benjamin Howard Baker, both of Great Britain. The American team was favored; John Murphy had won the U.S. trials, with Richmond Landon second and Harold Muller third.

Czechoslovakia, Greece, and Luxembourg each made their debut in the event. The United States appeared for the sixth time, having competed at each edition of the Olympic men's high jump to that point.

== Competition format ==
The competition used the two-round format introduced in 1912. There were two distinct rounds of jumping with results cleared between rounds. All jumpers clearing 1.80 metres in the qualifying round advanced to the final. There were jump-offs in the final to resolve ties.

== Records ==
These were the standing world and Olympic records (in metres) prior to the 1920 Summer Olympics.

World record	Edward Besson (USA)	2.01	Berkeley, United States	2 May 1914
Olympic record	Alma Richards (USA)	1.93	Stockholm, Sweden	8 July 1912

Richmond Landon set a new Olympic record with 1.936 metres.

== Schedule ==
Date	Time	Round
Sunday, 15 August 1920	16:30	Qualifying
Tuesday, 17 August 1920	14:30	Final

== Results ==
=== Qualifying ===
High jumpers clearing 1.80 metres advanced to the final.

Rank	Athlete	Nation	Height	Notes
1	Benjamin Howard Baker	Great Britain	1.80	Q
1	Timothy Carroll	Great Britain	1.80	Q
1	Bo Ekelund	Sweden	1.80	Q
1	Hans Jagenburg	Sweden	1.80	Q
1	René Labat	France	1.80	Q
1	Richmond Landon	United States	1.80	Q
1	Pierre Lewden	France	1.80	Q
1	Harold Muller	United States	1.80	Q
1	John Murphy	United States	1.80	Q
1	Thorvig Svahn	Sweden	1.80	Q
1	Einar Thulin	Sweden	1.80	Q
1	Walter Whalen	United States	1.80	Q
13	Pierre Guilloux	France	1.75	
14	Albert Harion	Belgium	1.70	
14	Eric Dunbar	Great Britain	1.70	
16	François Mahy	Belgium	1.65	
16	Jean Hénault	Belgium	1.65	
16	Dimitrios Andronidas	Greece	1.65	
16	František Stejskal	Czechoslovakia	1.65	
20	Henri Pleger	Luxembourg	1.60	
21	William Kennedy	Canada	No mark	
21	William Hunter	Great Britain	No mark	

=== Final ===
In a jump-off for silver, Muller beat Ekelund 1.88 metres to 1.85 metres. In a jump-off for fourth and fifth place, Whalen prevailed over Murphy though both jumped 1.89 metres.

Rank	Athlete	Nation	Height	Notes
1st place, gold medalist(s)	Richmond Landon	United States	1.936	OR
2nd place, silver medalist(s)	Harold Muller	United States	1.90	
3rd place, bronze medalist(s)	Bo Ekelund	Sweden	1.90	
4	Walter Whalen	United States	1.85	
5	John Murphy	United States	1.85	
6	Benjamin Howard Baker	Great Britain	1.85	
7	Pierre Lewden	France	1.80	
7	Einar Thulin	Sweden	1.80	
9	Timothy Carroll	Great Britain	1.75	
9	Hans Jagenburg	Sweden	1.75	
9	René Labat	France	1.75	
9	Thorvig Svahn	Sweden	1.75	

== Sources ==
- Belgium Olympic Committee (1957). Olympic Games Antwerp 1920: Official Report (in French).
- Wudarski, Pawel (1999). "Wyniki Igrzysk Olimpijskich" (in Polish).
