= Alice Lord =

Alice Lord may refer to:

- Alice Lord (union organizer) (1877–1940), American union organizer
- Alice Lord (diver) (1902–2000), American Olympic diver
- Alice Lord (EastEnders), a fictional character on BBC TV soap opera EastEnders
