= 1919 USA Outdoor Track and Field Championships =

American athletics championship event

- Dates: 13 September (men)
- Host city: Philadelphia, Pennsylvania (men)
- Venue: Franklin Field (men)
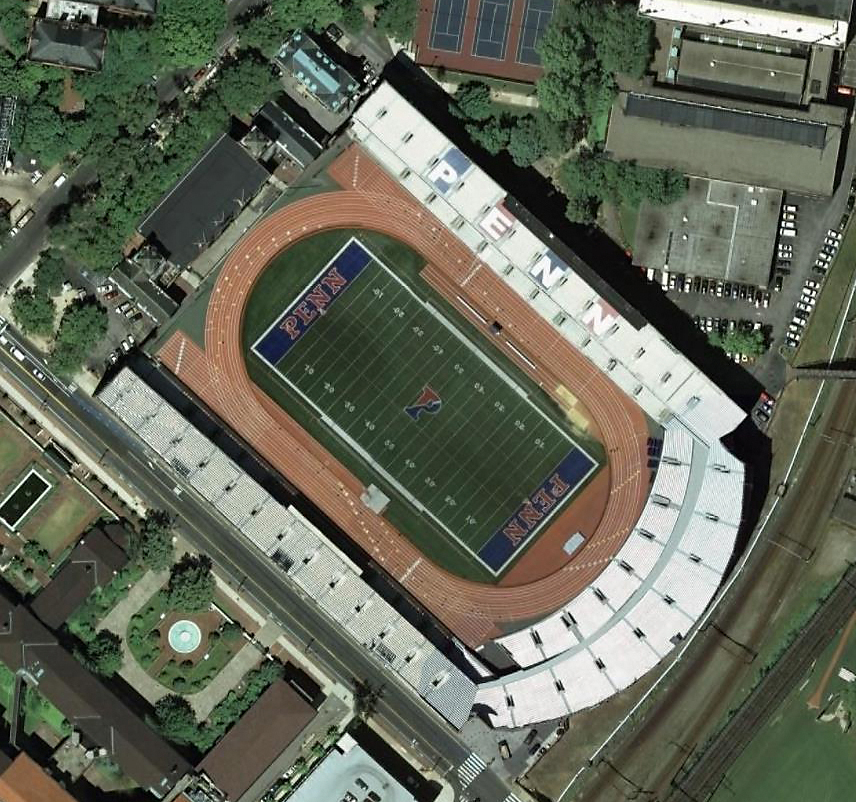

The 1919 USA Outdoor Track and Field Championships were organized by the Amateur Athletic Union (AAU) and served as the national championships in outdoor track and field for the United States.

The men's edition was held at Franklin Field in Philadelphia, Pennsylvania, and it took place 13 September. The first women's championships were not held until 1923.

At the championships, John Murphy broke the meeting record in the high jump as a surprising six athletes jumped over 6 feet (1.8 m).

== Results ==
Event	Gold		Silver		Bronze	
100 yards	William Hayes	10.2	Loren Murchison	"hairsbreadth"	Henry Williams	"close on heels"
220 yards	Henry Williams	21.8	Loren Murchison	2 yards behind	Morris Kirksey	inches behind 2nd
440 yards	Frank Shea	50.2	James O'Brien	1 yard behind	Jim Driscoll	
880 yards	Joseph Ray	1:56.0	Edward Fall	7 yards behind	Homer Baker	
1 mile	Joseph Ray	4:14.4	Edward Fall	4:15.0	James Connolly	
5 miles	Charles Pores	26:02.0	Patrick Flynn	20 yards behind	Max Bohland	
120 yards hurdles	Robert Simpson	15.2	Frederick Kelly	2 feet behind	Harold Barron	
440 yards hurdles	Floyd Smart	55.6	William Meanix		John Sellers	
2 miles steeplechase	Michael Devaney	10:17.4	Patrick Flynn	20 yards behind	Max Bohland	30 yards behind 2nd
High jump	John Murphy	1.91 m	Harry Barwise	1.88 m	Walter Whalen	1.88 m
Pole vault	Frank Foss	3.88 m	Percy Graham	3.81 m	Edward Knourek	3.81 m
Long jump	Floyd Smart	6.89 m	Sherman Landers	6.66 m	David Politzer	6.65 m
Triple jump	Sherman Landers	14.54 m	Erik Almlöf (SWE)	14.13 m	Daniel Ahearn	14.11 m
Shot put	Patrick McDonald	13.92 m	Arlie Mucks	13.69 m	Herbert Elsey	13.21 m
Discus throw	Arlie Mucks	43.83 m	Earl Gilfillian	42.68 m	Leslie R. Byrd	41.35 m
Hammer throw	Patrick James Ryan	53.48 m	Matthew McGrath	51.09 m	William Krapowitz	45.44 m
Javelin throw	George Bronder	53.80 m	James Lincoln	53.64 m	Arthur Tuck	52.14 m
220 yards hurdles	Robert Simpson	24.4				
Weight throw for distance	Patrick McDonald	11.43 m				
All-around decathlon	Samuel Thomson	6105.25 pts				

== See also ==
- List of USA Outdoor Track and Field Championships winners (men)
- List of USA Outdoor Track and Field Championships winners (women)
