= John Sellers =

John Sellers may refer to:

- John Sellers (surveyor) (1728–1804), American surveyor, founding member of the American Philosophical Society and Pennsylvania politician
- John Sellers (New Hampshire politician), American politician, member of the New Hampshire House of Representatives
- Brother John Sellers (1924–1999), American gospel and folk singer
- Johnny Sellers (1937–2010), American jockey
- John Sellers (hurdler) (born 1900), American hurdler, 3rd in the 400 m hurdles at the 1919 USA Outdoor Track and Field Championships

== See also ==
- John Sellars (disambiguation)
- John Seller (1632–1697), English cartographer
- Murder of Charlie Keever and Jonathan Sellers
