= Jagenburg =

Jagenburg is a Germanic surname. Notable people with the surname include:

- Gregory Jagenburg (born c.1957), American swimmer
- Hans Jagenburg (1894–1971), Swedish high jumper
