= Eugène Coulon =

Eugène Coulon may refer to:

- Eugène Coulon (athlete), French Olympic long jumper
- Eugène Coulon (water polo), French Olympic water polo player
- Eugène Germain Coulon, dance teacher
