= Juho Halme =

Finnish javelin thrower (1888–1918)

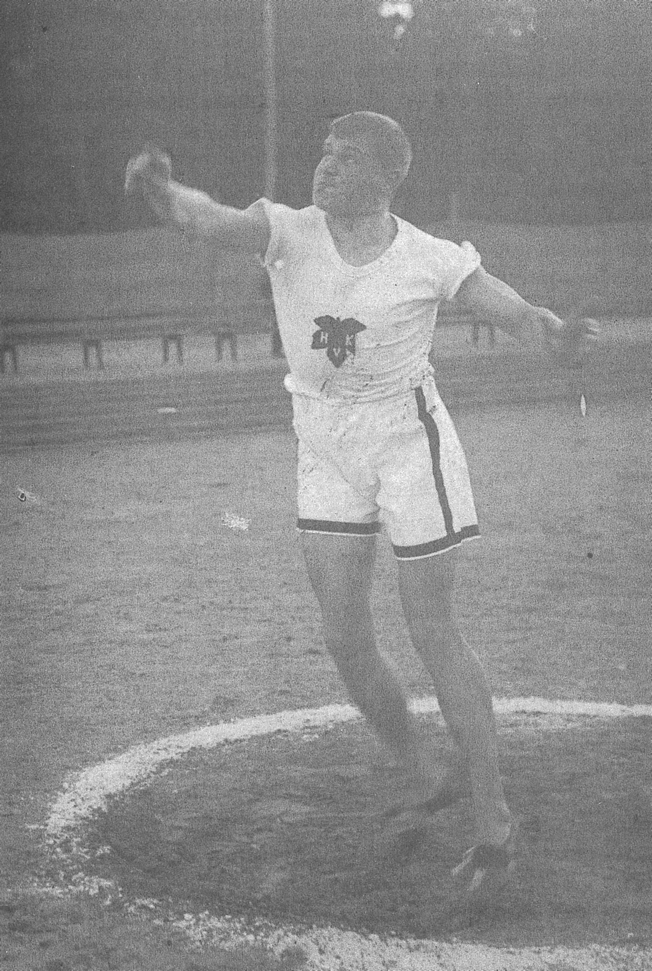
- Juho Halme in the uniform of Helsingin Kisa-Veikot

Personal information
- Full name: Johan Valdemar Halme
- Nicknames: Hindenburg, Juho, Jussi, Puuro, Sonni
- National team: Finland
- Born: Johan Valdemar Eliasson; May 24, 1888 Helsinki, Grand Duchy of Finland, Russian Empire
- Died: February 1, 1918 (aged 29) Helsinki, Finland
- Resting place: Hietaniemi Cemetery, Helsinki
- Occupations: Journalist, copy editor, chief executive officer, clerk, procurator
- Height: 178 cm (5 ft 10 in)
- Weight: 85 kg (187 lb)

Sport
- Sport: Track and field
- Event: Javelin throw
- Club: Iisalmen Visa; Helsingin Reipas; Helsingin Kisa-Veikot

Achievements and titles
- Personal bests: Javelin: 60.88 (1914); Triple jump: 14.51 (1914); Long jump: 662 (1915)

Johan Valdemar "Juho" Halme (born Johan Valdemar Eliasson; 24 May 1888 – 1 February 1918) was a Finnish track and field athlete who competed in the 1908 and 1912 Summer Olympics and won six Finnish championships in various events in 1907–1916. He died during the Finnish Civil War. He was born and died in Helsinki.

== Athletics ==
=== Olympics ===
Halme represented Finland in two Olympic Games.

Juho Halme at the Olympic Games
Games	Event	Rank	Result	Notes on source
1908 Summer Olympics	Javelin throw	6th	44.96	From New York Herald. His mark was not officially recorded.
1908 Summer Olympics	Freestyle javelin throw	9th	39.88	Source:
1908 Summer Olympics	Shot put	9th–25th	unknown	Source:
1908 Summer Olympics	Triple jump	18th–20th	unknown	From The Sportsman and The People. Many sources do not list him competing in this event.
1908 Summer Olympics	Discus throw	Did not start		Source:
1912 Summer Olympics	Javelin throw	4th	54.65	
1912 Summer Olympics	Two handed javelin throw	9th	88.54	
1912 Summer Olympics	Triple jump	11th	13.79	

=== National ===
Halme broke two Finnish records in athletics:

- 16 May 1912, javelin throw, 56.54
- 16 June 1912, triple jump, 13.95

He also became the second Finn to throw javelin over 60 meters.

He won six golds in the Finnish Championships in Athletics:

- triple jump in 1907, 1910 and 1911
- long jump in 1912
- javelin throw in 1914
- pentathlon in 1916

Halme competed in the British AAA Championships and finished second behind Ivar Sahlin in the triple jump event and second behind Mór Kóczán in the javelin at the 1914 AAA Championships.

He was the secretary of Helsingin Reipas in 1906–1907 and the chairman of Helsingin Kisa-Veikot in 1909–1918.

== Other ==
His parents were mason Johan David Eliasson and Amanda Sofia Jusenius. He finnicized his name from Eliasson to Halme in 1905.

Halme was the copy editor of Suomen Urheilulehti in 1912–1917 and the chief executive officer of its publisher Urheilijain Kustannus in 1911–1917.

He wrote the first Finnish language history of a sports club in 1907, on Helsingin Reipas.

Sportswriter Yrjö Halme was his brother. Together they founded the sports almanac Urheilukalenteri.

=== Death ===
Halme had been the manager of sports equipment shop Suomen Urheiluaitta since 1917. In the opening days of the Finnish Civil War, clothing and shoes from their stock were distributed to members of the White Guard fleeing Helsinki. In retaliation, Halme was shot on the stairs of the Helsinki Cathedral by Red Guardsmen and died of his wounds in hospital the following day.

== See also ==
- List of Olympians killed in World War I
- Juho Valdemar Halme in War Victims of Finland 1914–1922
- Juho Halme at Olympedia
