= Bo Ekelund =

Swedish high jumper

Personal information
- Born: 26 July 1894 Gävle, Sweden
- Died: 1 April 1983 (aged 88) Saltsjöbaden, Stockholm, Sweden
- Education: KTH Royal Institute of Technology; Yale University
- Height: 1.87 m (6 ft 2 in)
- Weight: 75 kg (165 lb)

Sport
- Sport: Athletics
- Event: High jump
- Club: IFK Malmö

Achievements and titles
- Personal best: 1.93 m (1919)
Medal record
Representing Sweden
Olympic Games
Bronze medal – third place	1920 Antwerp	High jump

Bo Daniel Ekelund (26 July 1894 – 1 April 1983) was a Swedish high jumper who won a bronze medal at the 1920 Summer Olympics. Ekelund was a top Scandinavian high jumper in the late 1910s. He won the Swedish Games with a jump of 1.85 m in 1916, the Scandinavian triangular meet in 1919, and Swedish national titles in 1919 and 1920. In September 1919, he set a new Scandinavian record at 1.93 m, which was the world's best jump in 1919. He received the Swedish sport award Stora Grabbars Märke in 1928.

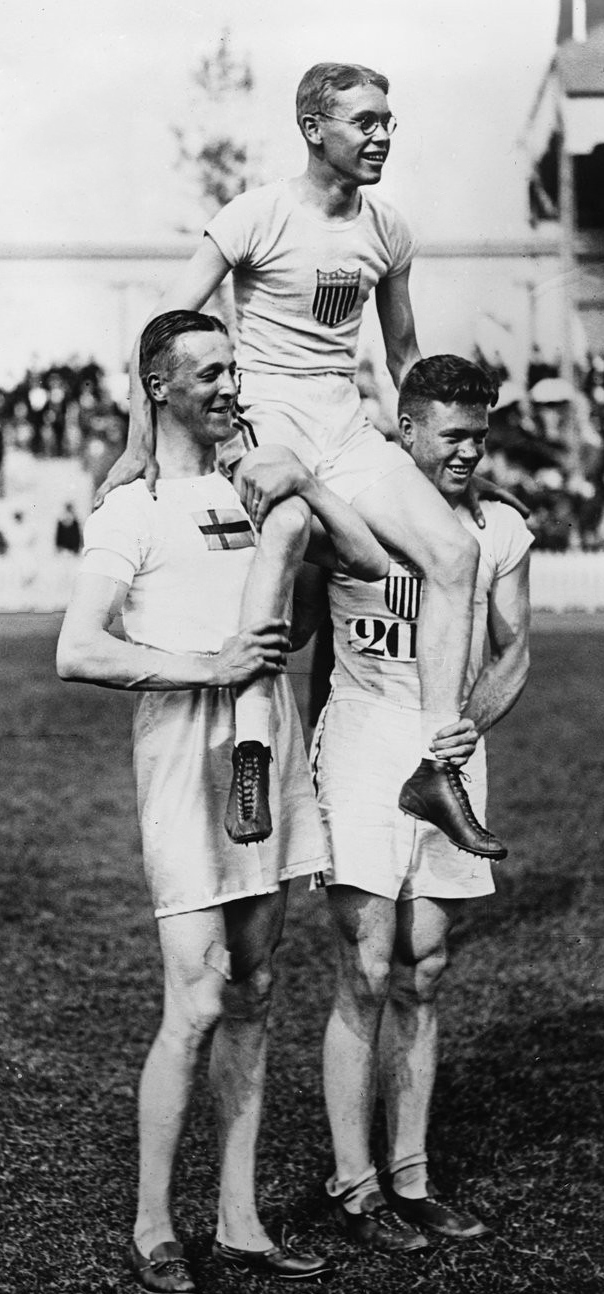
Bo Ekelund, Richmond Landon and Harold Muller at the 1920 Olympics

Ekelund retired from competitions in 1921, when he took an engineering job in Shanghai with the company Armerad Betong, eventually becoming its director. After returning to Sweden, he was also active in local politics, serving on the town council. In parallel, he acted as a sports administrator, serving as Secretary-General of the Stockholm University Sports Club in 1915, President of the Swedish Athletic Association in 1925–34, and Secretary-General of the IAAF in 1930–46. He also held a leading position at the Swedish Olympic Committee.

Ekelund was the father of business man Göran Ekelund and grandfather of financier Peter Ekelund.
