= Proux =

Proux is a French surname. Notable people with the surname include:

- Étienne Proux (1897–1983), French Olympic triple jumper
- Vanessa Proux (born 1974), French biologist
