= Labat =

Labat is a French surname. Notable people with the surname include:

- Florencia Labat (born 1971), Argentine tennis player
- Jean-Baptiste Labat (1663–1738), French clergyman, botanist, writer, explorer, ethnographer & soldier
- René Labat (born 1892), French athlete
- Tony Labat (born 1951), Cuban-born American multimedia artist
