= Athletics at the 1912 Summer Olympics – Men's long jump =

Men's long jump at the Games of the V Olympiad
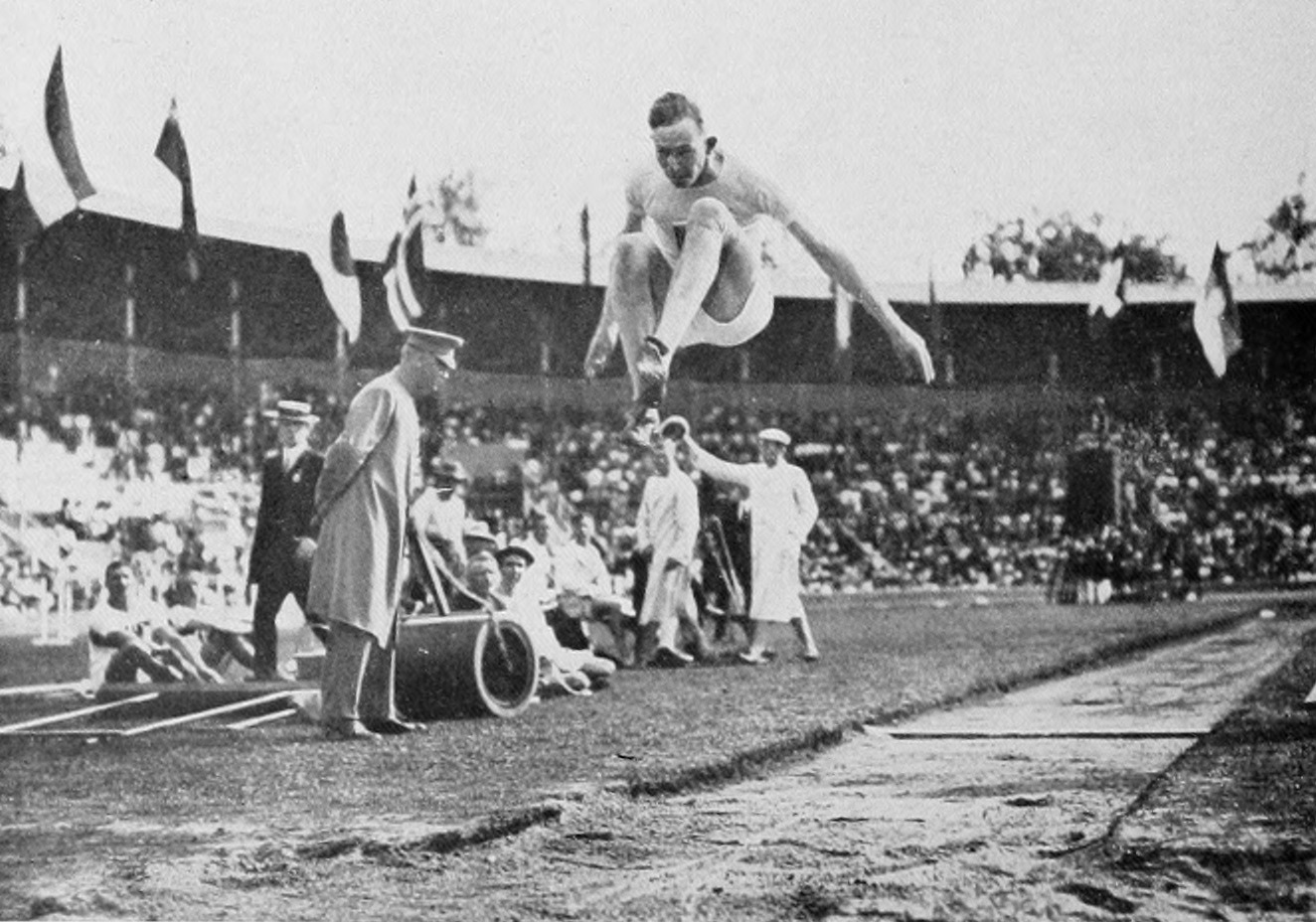
- Gutterson on the way to win the gold medal.
- Venue: Stockholm Olympic Stadium
- Date: July 12, 1912
- Competitors: 30 from 13 nations
- Winning distance: 7.60 OR

Medalists
| 1st place, gold medalist(s) | | Albert Gutterson; United States |
| 2nd place, silver medalist(s) | | Calvin Bricker; Canada |
| 3rd place, bronze medalist(s) | | Georg Åberg; Sweden |

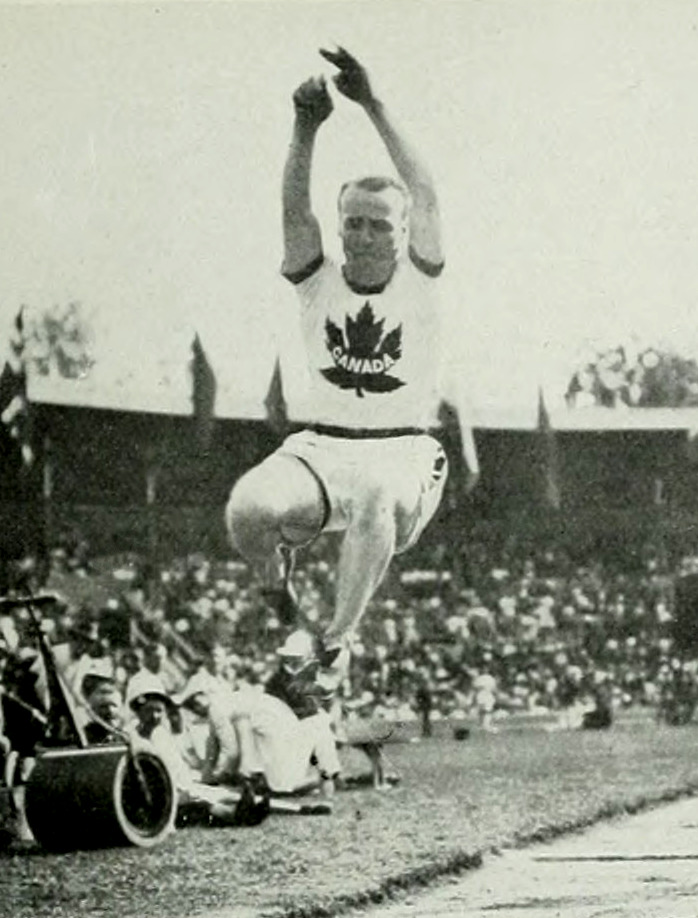
Silver medalist Calvin Bricker.

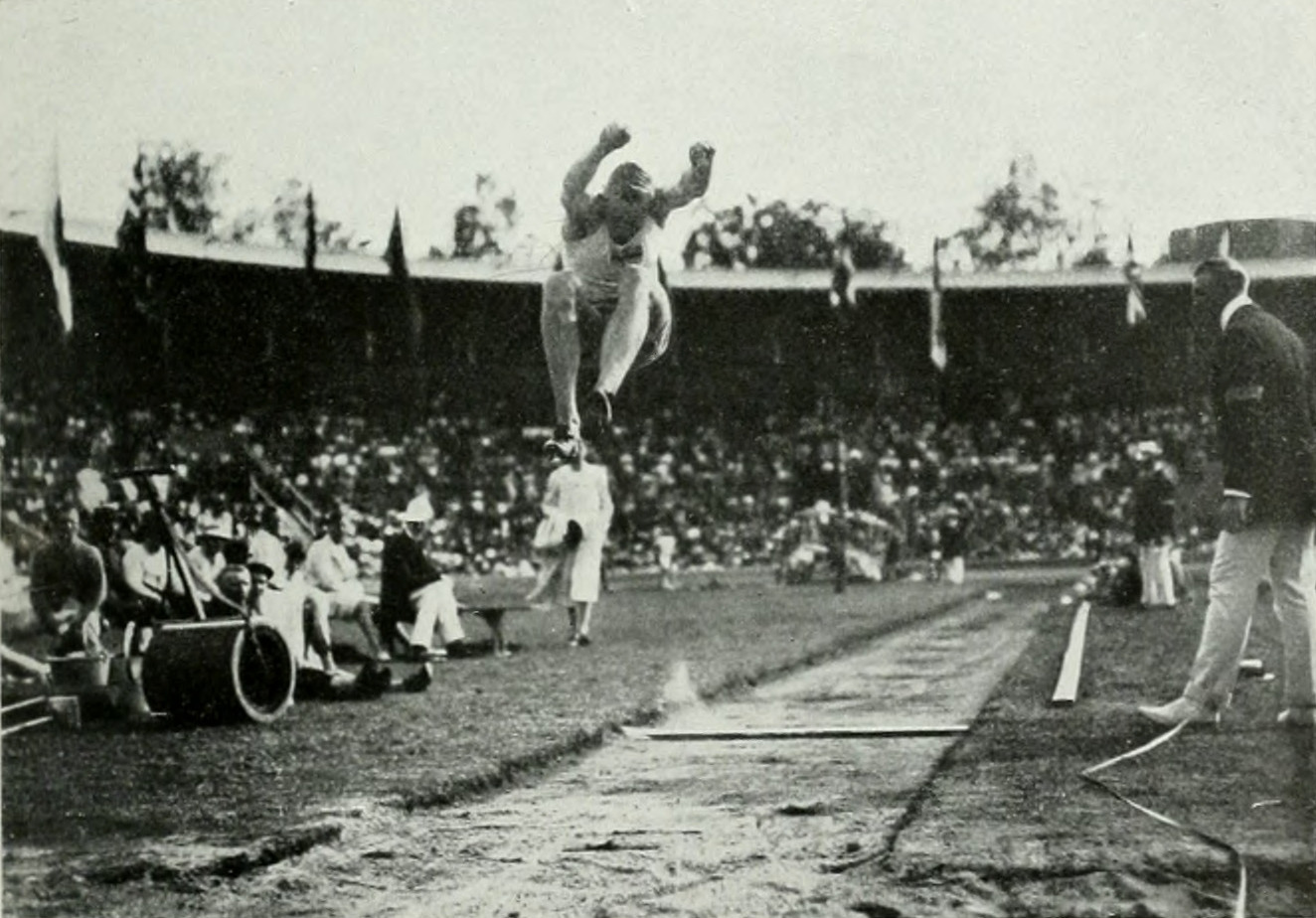
And the bronze medalist Georg Åberg in action.

The men's long jump was a track and field athletics event held as part of the athletics at the 1912 Summer Olympics programme. The competition was held on Friday, July 12, 1912. Thirty long jumpers from 13 nations competed. NOCs could enter up to 12 athletes. The event was won by Albert Gutterson of the United States, the nation's fifth gold medal in the event in five Games. Calvin Bricker of Canada became the second man to win a second medal in the long jump, adding a silver to his 1908 bronze. Sweden won its first long jump medal with Georg Åberg's bronze.

== Background ==
This was the fifth appearance of the event, which is one of 12 athletics events to have been held at every Summer Olympics. The 1908 gold and bronze medalists, Frank Irons of the United States and Calvin Bricker of Canada, returned. Irons was a "slight favorite" after winning the 1909 and 1910 AAU championships and the central U.S. Olympic trial.

Austria, Finland, Italy, Luxembourg, and Russia each made their first appearance in the event. The United States appeared for the fifth time, the only nation to have long jumpers at each of the Games so far.

== Competition format ==
The 1912 format continued to use the two-round format used in 1900 and 1908. Only the top three jumpers in the qualifying round advanced to the final. Each jumper had three jumps in the qualifying round; finalists received an additional three jumps, with qualifying round jumps still counting if the final jumps were not better.

== Records ==
These were the standing world and Olympic records (in metres) prior to the 1912 Summer Olympics.

| World record | Peter O'Connor (GBR) | 7.61 | Dublin, United Kingdom of Great Britain and Ireland | 5 August 1901 |
| Olympic record | Frank Irons (USA) | 7.48 | London, United Kingdom | 22 July 1908 |

Albert Gutterson's first jump broke the Olympic record of 7.48 metres by 12 centimetres. He matched the old record with his second jump, but could not better his first mark.

== Schedule ==
| Date | Time | Round |
|---|---|---|
| Friday, 12 July 1912 | 14:00 | Qualifying; Final |

== Results ==
The top three jumpers after three jumps received another three attempts; only Åberg was able to better his own mark.

| Rank | Athlete | Nation | Qualifying | | | | Final | | | |
| Rank | Athlete | Nation | 1 | 2 | 3 | Result | 4 | 5 | 6 | Result |
|---|---|---|---|---|---|---|---|---|---|---|
| 1st place, gold medalist(s) | Albert Gutterson | United States | 7.60; OR | 7.48 | 7.25 | 7.60 | 7.18 | 7.09 | 7.09 | 7.60 |
| 2nd place, silver medalist(s) | Calvin Bricker | Canada | 6.92 | 7.07 | 7.21 | 7.21 | 7.04 | 6.85 | — | 7.21 |
| 3rd place, bronze medalist(s) | Georg Åberg | Sweden | 7.04 | 6.70 | 6.99 | 7.04 | 6.98 | 7.18 | 6.63 | 7.18 |
| 4 | Harry Worthington | United States | 7.03 | 6.96 | 6.65 | 7.03 | Did not advance | | | 7.03 |
| 5 | Eugene Mercer | United States | 6.97 | 6.84 | 6.84 | 6.97 | Did not advance | | | 6.97 |
| 6 | Fred Allen | United States | — | 6.94 | 6.91 | 6.94 | Did not advance | | | 6.94 |
| 7 | Jim Thorpe | United States | 6.67 | 6.89 | 6.62 | 6.89 | Did not advance | | | 6.89 |
| 8 | Robert Pasemann | Germany | 6.82 | 6.80 | 6.54 | 6.82 | Did not advance | | | 6.82 |
| 9 | Frank Irons | United States | — | 6.80 | 6.72 | 6.80 | Did not advance | | | 6.80 |
| 10 | Henry Ashington | Great Britain | 6.61 | 6.78 | — | 6.78 | Did not advance | | | 6.78 |
| 11 | Ferdinand Bie | Norway | 6.75 | 6.70 | 6.36 | 6.75 | Did not advance | | | 6.75 |
| 12 | Sidney Abrahams | Great Britain | 6.74 | 6.54 | 6.52 | 6.74 | Did not advance | | | 6.74 |
| 13 | Edward Farrell | United States | 6.71 | 6.36 | 6.46 | 6.71 | Did not advance | | | 6.71 |
| 13 | Nils Fixdal | Norway | 6.71 | — | 6.65 | 6.71 | Did not advance | | | 6.71 |
| 15 | Philip Kingsford | Great Britain | 6.52 | 6.65 | 6.33 | 6.65 | Did not advance | | | 6.65 |
| 16 | André Campana | France | 6.21 | 6.64 | 6.55 | 6.64 | Did not advance | | | 6.64 |
| 17 | Charles Lomberg | Sweden | 6.44 | 6.52 | 6.62 | 6.62 | Did not advance | | | 6.62 |
| 18 | Viktor Franzl | Austria | 6.57 | 6.53 | 6.50 | 6.57 | Did not advance | | | 6.57 |
| 19 | Angelo Tonini | Italy | 6.25 | 6.44 | — | 6.44 | Did not advance | | | 6.44 |
| 20 | Patrik Ohlsson | Sweden | 6.06 | 6.28 | — | 6.28 | Did not advance | | | 6.28 |
| 21 | Gustav Betzén | Sweden | 6.24 | — | — | 6.24 | Did not advance | | | 6.24 |
| 22 | Aleksandr Schultz | Russia | 5.80 | 5.97 | 6.15 | 6.15 | Did not advance | | | 6.15 |
| 23 | Philipp Ehrenreich | Austria | 5.95 | 6.10 | 6.14 | 6.14 | Did not advance | | | 6.14 |
| 24 | Emil Kukko | Finland | 6.11 | 5.92 | 5.98 | 6.11 | Did not advance | | | 6.11 |
| 25 | Pál Szalay | Hungary | 5.98 | — | — | 5.98 | Did not advance | | | 5.98 |
| 26 | Nándor Kovács | Hungary | — | — | 5.96 | 5.96 | Did not advance | | | 5.96 |
| 27 | Alfredo Pagani | Italy | 5.89 | 5.95 | — | 5.95 | Did not advance | | | 5.95 |
| 28 | Arthur Maranda | Canada | 5.87 | 5.72 | 5.86 | 5.87 | Did not advance | | | 5.87 |
| 29 | Manlio Legat | Italy | — | 5.50 | — | 5.50 | Did not advance | | | 5.50 |
| 30 | Paul Fournelle | Luxembourg | — | — | — | No mark | Did not advance | | | No mark |

== Sources ==
- Bergvall, Erik, ed. (1913). The Official Report of the Olympic Games of Stockholm 1912. Translated by Adams-Ray, Edward. Stockholm: Wahlström & Widstrand.
- Wudarski, Pawel (1999). "Wyniki Igrzysk Olimpijskich" (in Polish).
