= Courtin =

Courtin is a surname. Notable people with the surname include:

- Charles Courtin (1902–?), French long jumper
- Christina Courtin (born 1984), American singer, violinist, and songwriter
- Cyrille Courtin (born 1971), former professional footballer
- Robina Courtin (born 1944), Buddhist nun in the Tibetan Buddhist Gelugpa tradition

== See also ==
- as an abbreviation of "courting":
  - Drinkin' and Courtin'
  - Frog Went A-Courtin' (book)
