= Gustave De Bruyne =

Belgian long jumper

Personal information
- Full name: Gustave Henri De Bruyne
- Nationality: Belgian

Sport
- Sport: Athletics
- Event: Long jump

Gustave Henri De Bruyne was a Belgian athlete. He competed in the men's long jump at the 1920 Summer Olympics.
