= Athletics at the 1920 Summer Olympics – Men's triple jump =

Men's triple jump at the Games of the VII Olympiad
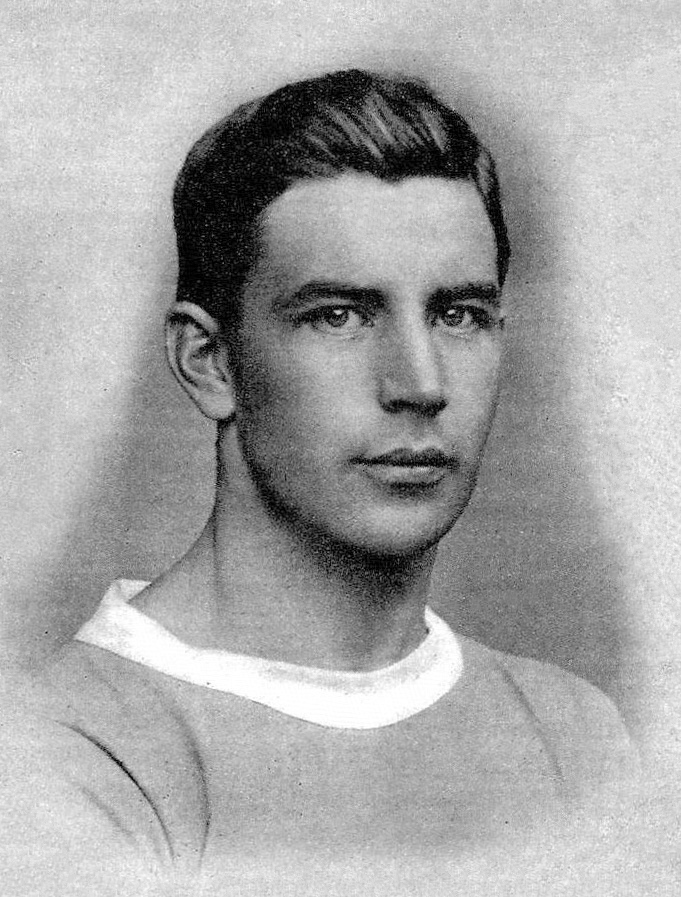
- Vilho Tuulos
- Venue: Olympisch Stadion
- Dates: August 19–21, 1920
- Competitors: 21 from 8 nations
- Winning distance: 14.505

Medalists
1st place, gold medalist(s)		Vilho Tuulos; Finland
2nd place, silver medalist(s)		Folke Jansson; Sweden
3rd place, bronze medalist(s)		Erik Almlöf; Sweden

The men's triple jump event was part of the track and field athletics programme at the 1920 Summer Olympics. The competition was held from Thursday, August 19, 1920, to Saturday, August 21, 1920. Twenty-one triple jumpers from eight nations competed. No nation had more than four jumpers, suggesting the limit had been reduced from the 12 maximum in force in 1908 and 1912. The event was won by Vilho Tuulos of Finland, the nation's first medal in the triple jump. Sweden, which had swept the medals in 1912, took the next three places. Erik Almlöf became the third man to win two medals in the event, repeating his bronze performance from 1912.

The winning margin was 2.5 cm which as of 2023 remains the only time the men's triple jump was won by less than 4 cm at the Olympics.

== Background ==
This was the sixth appearance of the event, which is one of 12 athletics events to have been held at every Summer Olympics. Two jumpers from the pre-war 1912 Games returned: bronze medalist Erik Almlöf of Sweden and fourth-place finisher Erling Vinne of Norway.

Czechoslovakia made its first appearance in the event. The United States competed for the sixth time, having competed at each of the Games so far.

== Competition format ==
The competition was described as two rounds at the time, but was more similar to the modern divided final. All athletes received three jumps initially. The top six after that received an additional three jumps to improve their distance, but the initial jumps would still count if no improvement was made.

== Records ==
These were the standing world and Olympic records (in metres) prior to the 1920 Summer Olympics. Dan Ahearn set his world record while being a citizen of the United Kingdom of Great Britain and Ireland; at this Olympics he represented the United States, finishing in the sixth place.

World record	Dan Ahearn (GBR)	15.52	New York, United States	30 May 1911
Olympic record	Tim Ahearne (GBR)	14.92	London, United Kingdom of Great Britain and Ireland	25 July 1908

No new world or Olympic records were set during the competition.

== Schedule ==
Date	Time	Round
Thursday, 19 August 1920	14:30	Qualifying
Saturday, 21 August 1920	11:30	Final

== Results ==
The best six triple jumpers qualified for the final.

Rank	Athlete	Nation	1	2	3	4	5	6	Distance
1	Vilho Tuulos	Finland	14.505	14.460	14.395	No improvement			14.505
2	Folke Jansson	Sweden	14.160	13.700	14.160	14.480			14.480
3	Erik Almlöf	Sweden	13.920	14.190	?	14.270			14.270
4	Ivar Sahlin	Sweden	?	?	?	14.175			14.175
5	Sherman Landers	United States	13.865	?	?	14.170			14.17
6	Dan Ahearn	United States	?	?	?	14.080			14.080
7	Ossian Nylund	Finland	13.740	13.695	13.370	did not advance			13.740
8	Benjamin Howard Baker	Great Britain	?	?	?	did not advance			13.675
9	Kaare Bache	Norway	12.890	13.640	13.000	did not advance			13.640
10	Sven Runström	Sweden	13.630	13.350	13.550	did not advance			13.630
11	Erling Juul	Norway	12.800	13.590	13.480	did not advance			13.590
12	Kaufman Geist	United States	?	?	?	did not advance			13.520
13	Erling Vinne	Norway	13.290	?	?	did not advance			13.340
14	Charles Lively	Great Britain	?	?	?	did not advance			13.150
15	Clarence Jaquith	United States	12.600	?	?	did not advance			13.040
16	Etienne Proux	France	?	?	?	did not advance			12.925
17	André Chilo	France	?	?	?	did not advance			12.650
18	Menelaos Ponireas	Greece	?	?	?	did not advance			12.600
19	Gustave Remouet	France	?	?	?	did not advance			12.475
—	František Šretr	Czechoslovakia	X	X	X	did not advance			No mark
—	František Stejskal	Czechoslovakia	X	X	X	did not advance			No mark
—	Eugène Coulon	France	DNS						
—	Maxime Girard	France	DNS						

== Sources ==
- Belgium Olympic Committee (1957). Olympic Games Antwerp 1920: Official Report (in French).
- Wudarski, Pawel (1999). "Wyniki Igrzysk Olimpijskich" (in Polish).
