= John Sellars =

John Sellars may refer to:

- John Sellars (academic administrator), president of Graceland University 2007–2017
- John Sellars (footballer) (1924–1985), English footballer
- John Sellars (sport shooter), British sport shooter; see Shooting at the 1908 Summer Olympics – Men's 1000 yard free rifle

== See also ==
- John Sellers (disambiguation)
