= Clarence Jaquith =

American triple jumper

Clarence Edmond Jaquith (February 24, 1896 – March 27, 1993) was an American track and field athlete who competed in the 1920 Summer Olympics. In 1920, he finished 15th in the triple jump competition.
