= Menelaos Ponireas =

Greek triple jumper

Personal information
- Nationality: Greek
- Born: 1888
- Died: Unknown

Sport
- Sport: Athletics
- Event: Triple jump

Menelaos Ponireas (born 1888, date of death unknown) was a Greek athlete. He competed in the men's triple jump at the 1920 Summer Olympics.
