= Timothy Carroll (athlete) =

Irish track and field athlete

Timothy J. Carroll (8 July 1888 – 25 May 1955) was an Irish track and field athlete who competed for the United Kingdom of Great Britain and Ireland in the 1912 Summer Olympics and in the 1920 Summer Olympics. He was born in Cork.

In 1912, he finished ninth in the high jump competition. He also participated in the triple jump event and finished 19th. Eight years later, he finished ninth again in the high jump competition of the 1920 Olympics.
