= Knut Fixdal =

Norwegian civil servant

- Born: 16 September 1887
- Died: 22 July 1969 (aged 81)
- Occupation(s): Road engineer, civil servant

Knut Fixdal (16 September 1887 – 22 July 1969) was a Norwegian civil servant born in Vestnes. He worked as road engineer in Finnmark from 1920, and in Telemark from 1937. His brother Nils Fixdal was an athlete. Fixdal was incarcerated at the Grini concentration camp during the Second World War from June 1942 to May 1945, and took over as acting county manager of Telemark after the war from 8 May to 1 September 1945. He served as road manager from 1949 to 1957.
