= Carl Abrahamsson =

- Born: 1 May 1896; Södertälje, SWE
- Died: 25 December 1948 (aged 52); Södertälje, SWE
- Position: Defence
- Played for: Södertälje SK; AIK Bandy
- National team: Sweden
- Playing career: 1924–1935

Carl Abrahamsson
Medal record

Men's ice hockey

Representing Sweden

Olympic Games
Silver medal – second place	1928 St. Moritz	Team competition

Karl Gustaf Emanuel "Carl" or "Calle Aber" Abrahamsson (1 May 1896 in Södertälje, Sweden – 25 December 1948) was a Swedish track and field athletic, bandy and ice hockey player who competed in the 1928 Winter Olympics. He was also a coach and captain, mainly in the Swedish club Södertälje SK.

Abrahamsson participated in building the bandy section of Södertälje SK (SSK) during the 1920s. He was recruited to AIK's bandy team and played with the side in the Swedish championship finals against IFK Uppsala in 1915 and 1917. Abrahamsson also had a successful career in track and field, where he won 28 district championship in various sports and represented Sweden at the Baltiska spelen (Baltic Games) associated with the Baltic Exhibition in Malmö 1914. During this time he gained a lot of attention in the Swedish press and was compared to Douglas Fairbanks in terms of spirit and athleticism.

Abrahamsson's younger brother, Erik Abrahamsson, started playing ice hockey in 1921 and played with AIK and IFK Stockholm, and also in the Swedish national ice hockey team. Erik and Carl managed to convince SSK's board of directors to incorporate ice hockey in the club. In the same year, SSK played in the Swedish championship final and won the title as Swedish champions after Abrahamsson scored the gaming winning goal against Västerås SK.

Abrahamsson was selected for the Swedish national team for the first time in 1926 and won the silver at the 1928 Winter Olympics in St. Moritz. He also played at the 1931 World Championships and the 1932 European Championships. He was later awarded with the Stora Grabbars Märke.

When his active playing career finished in 1935, he continued as team captain and coach in SSK. He was also commissioned by the Swedish Ice Hockey Association where he was vice-chairman from 1926 to 1939. He was chairman in SSK from 1927 to 1936. On Christmas Day 1948, he died of a heart attack.

He was married (1930) to the writer Aurora Nilsson.
