= Sven Runström =

Swedish track and field athlete

Sven Anders Runström (8 April 1896 – 25 March 1966) was a Swedish track and field athlete who competed in the 1920 Summer Olympics. In 1920 he finished tenth in the triple jump competition.
