= Fred Allen (long jumper) =

American long jumper

Frederick Harold Allen (December 6, 1890 – January 15, 1964) was an American track and field athlete who competed in the 1912 Summer Olympics. In 1912 he finished sixth in the long jump competition.
