= Erling Juul =

Norwegian triple jumper

Erling Juul (14 February 1897 – 4 January 1989) was a Norwegian track and field athlete who competed in the 1920 Summer Olympics. In 1920, he finished eleventh in the triple jump competition.
