= Henri Pleger =

Luxembourgish athlete

Personal information
- Nationality: Luxembourgish
- Born: 25 October 1898 Bettembourg, Luxembourg
- Died: 5 July 1982 (aged 83)

Sport
- Sport: Athletics
- Events: Long jump High jump

Henri Pleger (25 October 1898 – 5 July 1982) was a Luxembourgish athlete. He competed in the men's long jump and the men's high jump at the 1920 Summer Olympics.
