= Hans Kindler (athlete) =

Swiss long jumper

Personal information
- Nationality: Swiss
- Born: 30 May 1902
- Died: 30 May 1988 (aged 86)

Sport
- Sport: Athletics
- Event: Long jump

Hans Kindler (born 30 May 1902, date of death unknown) was a Swiss athlete. He competed in the men's long jump at the 1920 Summer Olympics.
