= František Šretr =

Czech athlete

Personal information
- Nationality: Czech
- Born: 15 January 1893 Pardubice, Austria-Hungary
- Died: 24 July 1952 (aged 59) Chicago, United States

Sport
- Sport: Athletics
- Events: Long jump Triple jump

František Šretr (15 January 1893 – 24 July 1952) was a Czech athlete. He competed in the men's long jump and the men's triple jump at the 1920 Summer Olympics.
