= Edward Farrell (athlete) =

American track and field athlete

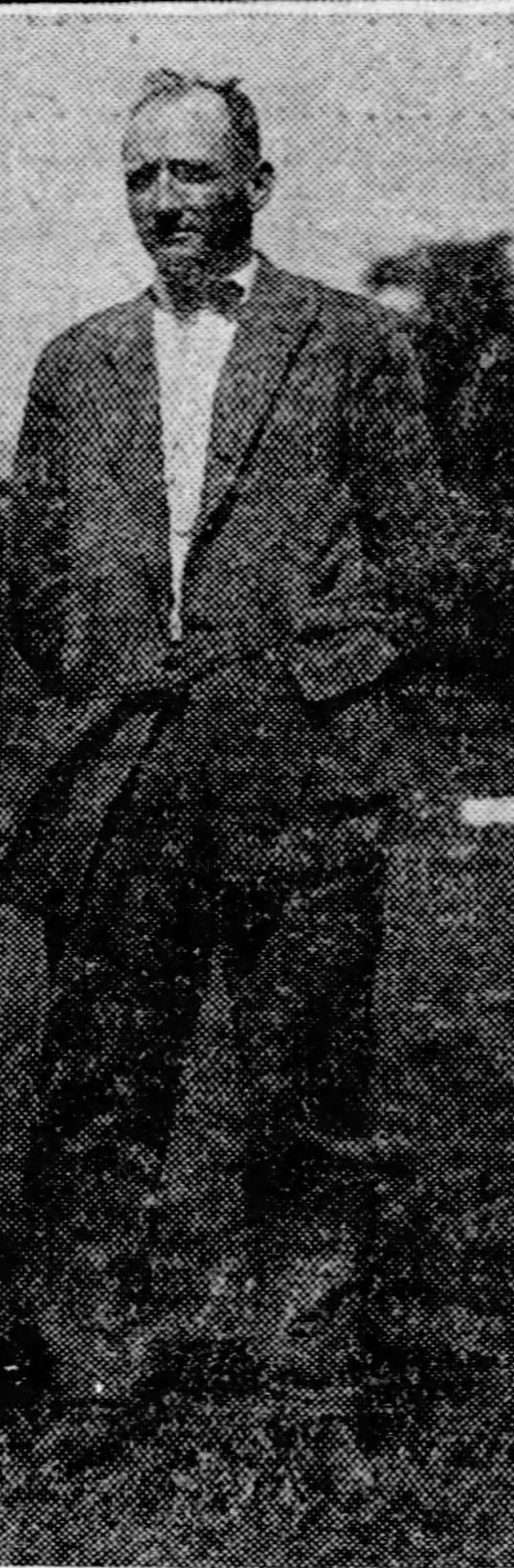
Farrell as Harvard track coach in 1925

Edward Leo Farrell (June 14, 1885 – July 18, 1953) was an American track and field athlete who competed in the 1912 Summer Olympics. He was born in Boston, Massachusetts and died in Watertown, Massachusetts. In 1912, he finished 13th in the triple jump event and 14th in the long jump competition.

In 1917, Farrell became the assistant track coach at Harvard University and was elevated to head coach in 1923, and was that until 1936.
