= Carl Johnson (long jumper) =

American long jumper (1898–1932)

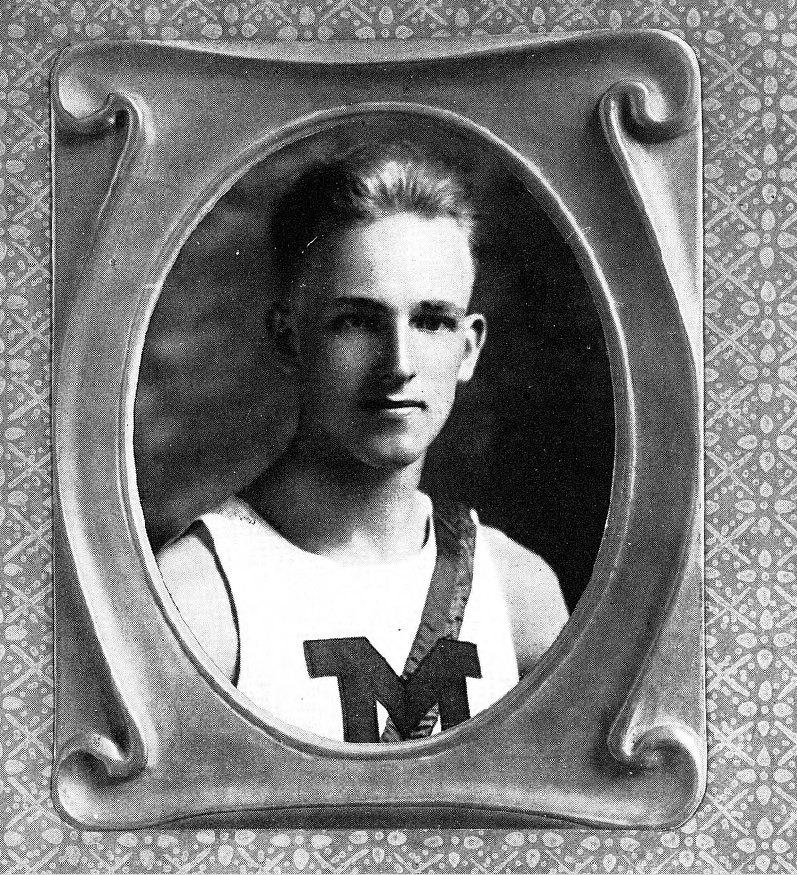
- Carl Johnson, captain of the University of Michigan track team, 1921

Personal information
- Nationality: United States
- Born: May 21, 1898 Genesee County, Michigan
- Died: September 13, 1932 (aged 34) Detroit, Michigan
- Height: 5 ft 9 in (1.75 m)
- Weight: 134 lb (61 kg; 9.6 st)

Sport
- Country: United States
- Sport: Track and Field
- Event: Long Jump
- College team: University of Michigan
Medal record
Men's athletics
Representing the United States
Silver medal – second place	1920 Antwerp	Long jump

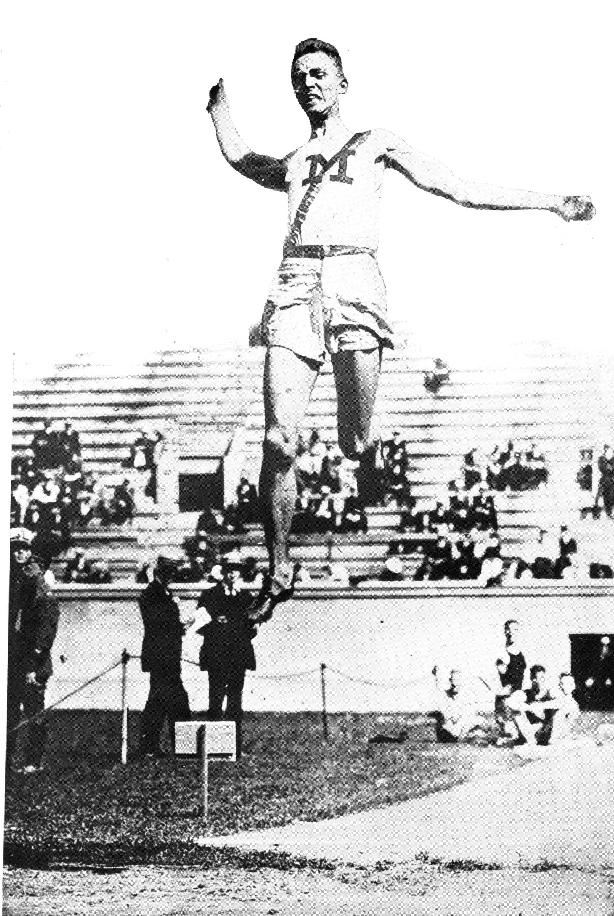
Johnson in the broad jump, 1919

Carl Johnson (Carl Edward Johnson; May 21, 1898 – September 13, 1932) was an American athlete who competed mainly in the long jump. He competed for the United States in the 1920 Summer Olympics held in Antwerp, Belgium in the long jump, where he won the silver medal.

== Early life ==
Johnson was born in Genesee County, Michigan, but moved to Spokane, Washington as a child. In 1915, as a Spokane high school student, he competed as an individual in the National Interscholastics and finished second in the team competition.

He returned to Michigan in 1916 to enroll at the University of Michigan, where he was a member of the track team from 1918 to 1920 and became one of the greatest track and field athletes in the university's history. While attending Michigan, Johnson was also Class President during his junior year, President of the Student Council during his senior year, Chairman of the Ferry Field War Memorial Committee, a Student Member of the Senate Committee on Student Affairs, and a member of Phi Kappa Psi, Michigamua, Sphinx, Griffins, Spotlight Vaudeville Committee, Union Opera Committee, French Memorial Committee, Roosevelt Memorial Committee, Union House Committee, and the Board of Directors of Michigan Chimes. Competing for Michigan at the 1919 IC4A, he won the long jump, placed second in the 100 yard dash, and tied for second in the high jump. He also had his personal best long jump, 24 feet 1 inch (7.34 m) in 1919.

== Olympics ==
He did not compete in most of the 1920 college track and field season, and he had a poor performance at the Olympic tryouts. Nevertheless, he made the Olympic team. At the Olympics, in the qualifying round, he jumped 6.82 metres (22 ft 5 in). He qualified for the final round, where he leapt 7.095 metres (23 ft 3.3 in), which earned him the silver medal.
