= Hjalmar Ohlsson =

Swedish triple jumper

Hjalmar Ohlsson (October 9, 1891 – February 27, 1975) was a Swedish track and field athlete who competed in the 1912 Summer Olympics. In 1912, he finished seventh in the triple jump competition.
