= Kaufman Geist =

American triple jumper

Kaufman Geist (February 5, 1895 – April 21, 1948) was an American track and field athlete who competed in the 1920 Summer Olympics. In 1920 he finished twelfth in the triple jump competition.
