= Georg Åberg =

Swedish long and triple jumper

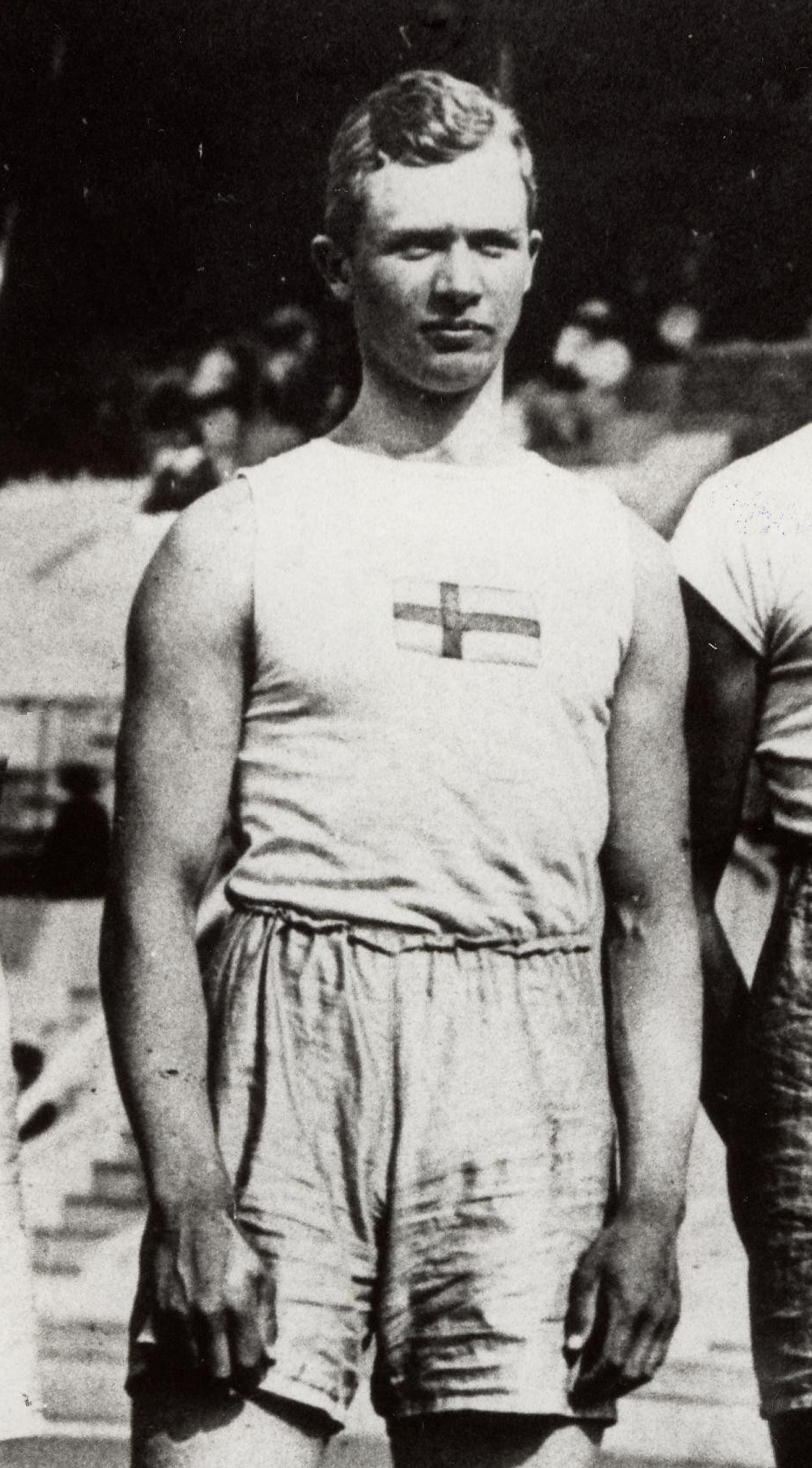
- Georg Åberg at the 1912 Olympics

Personal information
- Born: 20 January 1893 Hellestad, Norrköping, Sweden
- Died: 18 August 1946 (aged 53) Stockholm, Sweden
- Height: 1.81 m (5 ft 11 in)
- Weight: 78 kg (172 lb)

Sport
- Sport: Athletics
- Events: Long jump, triple jump
- Club: IFK Norrköping

Achievements and titles
- Personal bests: LJ – 7.18 m (1912); TJ – 14.51 m (1912)
Medal record
Representing Sweden
Olympic Games
| Silver medal – second place | 1912 Stockholm | Triple jump |
| Bronze medal – third place | 1912 Stockholm | Long jump |

Nils Georg Åberg (20 January 1893 – 18 August 1946) was a Swedish athlete who competed at the 1912 Olympics. He won a bronze medal in the long jump and placed second in the triple jump, in which Sweden collected all three medals. He won the long jump event at the Swedish Games in 1916 and at the national championships in 1912, 1913 and 1915. After retiring from competitions he directed his own firm.
