= William Petersson =

Swedish athlete

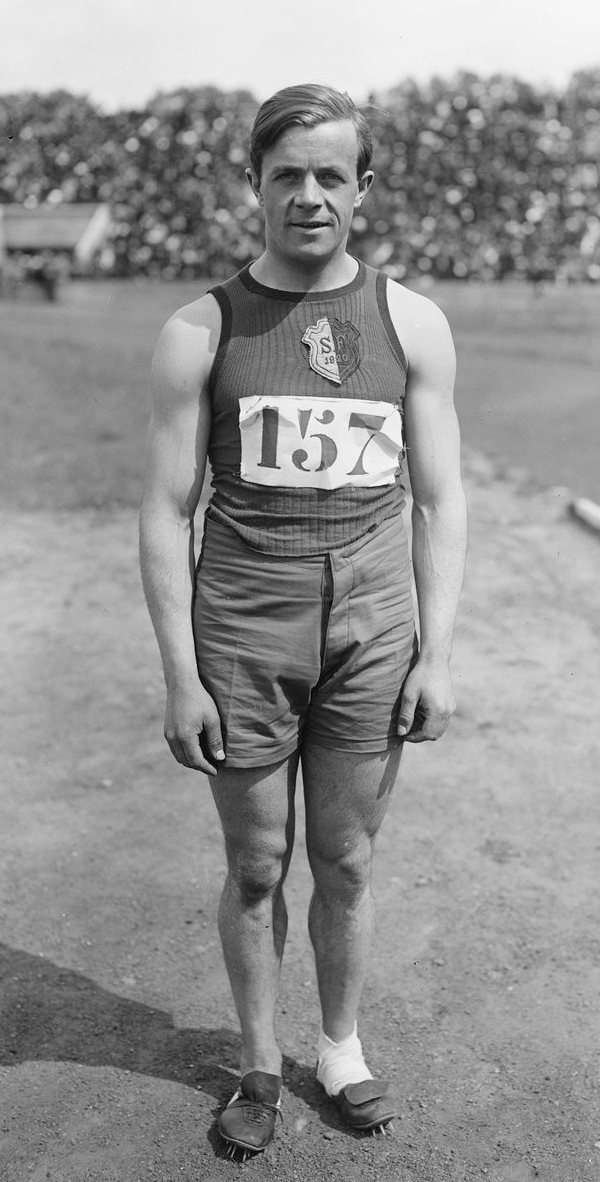
- William Petersson in 1921

Personal information
- Born: 6 October 1895 Sandby, Sweden
- Died: 10 May 1965 (aged 69) Kalmar, Sweden

Sport
- Sport: Athletics
- Events: 100 m, long jump
- Club: Kalmar IS

Achievements and titles
- Personal bests: 100 m – 11.0 (1918); LJ – 7.39 m (1924)
Medal record
Men's athletics
Representing Sweden
Olympic Games
Gold medal – first place	1920 Antwerp	Long jump
Bronze medal – third place	1920 Antwerp	4 × 100 m relay

Reinhold William Eugen Petersson (later Björneman, 6 October 1895 – 10 May 1965) was a Swedish athlete, who competed at the 1920 Summer Olympics.

== Biography ==
In 1918, Petersson graduated from the Schartaus Institute of Trade and then worked in the banking sector in Germany, France, and Britain. Petersson won the British AAA Championships long jump title at the 1919 AAA Championships.

The following year, at the 1920 Olympic Games, he competed in the long jump and 4 × 100 m relay and won gold and bronze medals, respectively. Petersson won four Swedish long jump titles, in 1918–20 and 1924. He returned to Britain to compete in the 1921 AAA Championships and finished second behind H.C. Taylor in the long jump event.

In 1928, he became assistant director and then Vice President of J. G. Schwartz in Norrköping. In 1938, he moved to assistant director and then vice president at margarine factories in Stockholm, and after 1941, he headed slaughterhouses in Malmö. In 1940, he represented Sweden at a special trade mission in London.
