= Gustaf Nordén =

Swedish triple jumper

Gustaf Nordén (October 23, 1884 – December 14, 1947) was a Swedish track and field athlete who competed in the 1912 Summer Olympics. In 1912, he finished tenth in the triple jump competition.
