= Erik Almlöf =

Swedish triple jumper

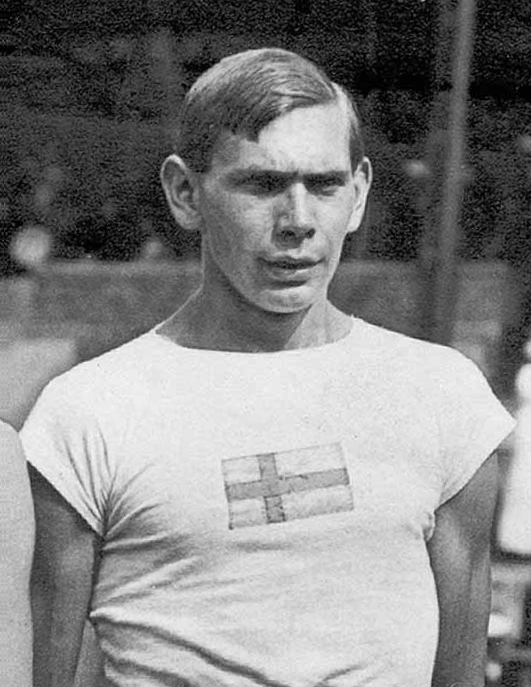
- Almlöf at the 1912 Olympics

Personal information
- Born: 20 December 1891 Stockholm, Sweden
- Died: 18 January 1971 (aged 79) Jenkintown, Pennsylvania, United States
- Height: 1.88 m (6 ft 2 in)
- Weight: 73 kg (161 lb)

Sport
- Sport: Athletics
- Event: Triple jump
- Club: Djurgårdens IF; IFK Gävle

Achievements and titles
- Personal best: 14.48 m (1922)
Medal record
Representing Sweden
Olympic Games
Bronze medal – third place	1912 Stockholm	Triple jump
Bronze medal – third place	1920 Antwerp	Triple jump

Erik Albin Almlöf (20 December 1891 – 18 January 1971) was a Swedish athlete who specialized in the triple jump. He competed at the 1912 Summer Olympics in Stockholm, where he won the bronze medal. Due to World War I no Olympics were held in 1916, but Almlöf returned to the 1920 Summer Olympics in Antwerp, Belgium, where he won his second Olympic bronze medal.

== Career ==
Between the 1912 and 1920 Olympics, Almlöf won two national titles in 1913–14, finished third behind Ivar Sahlin in the triple jump event at the British 1914 AAA Championships, won the 1915–16 Swedish-American meet, won the 1919 Metropolitan (US) title, and was second at the US National Championships, both indoors and outdoors, in 1916.

After the 1920 Olympics, Almlöf finished second at the United States – France – Sweden meet. His last major competition was the 1923 Göteborg Games, where he finished fourth. Almlöf was a businessman operating between Sweden and the United States, where he died in 1971.

Almlöf represented Djurgårdens IF and IFK Gävle.
