= Einar Thulin =

Swedish track and field athlete (1896–1963)

Einar Thulin (April 21, 1896 – October 20, 1963) was a Swedish track and field athlete who competed in the 1920 Summer Olympics. In 1920 he finished seventh in the high jump competition.
