= Albert Harion =

Belgian high jumper

Personal information
- Nationality: Belgian
- Born: 30 June 1891
- Died: 24 July 1948 (aged 57)

Sport
- Sport: Athletics
- Event: High jump

Albert Harion (30 June 1891 – 24 July 1948) was a Belgian athlete. He competed in the men's high jump at the 1920 Summer Olympics.
