= Patrik Ohlsson =

Swedish track and field athlete

Patrik Ohlsson (October 28, 1889 – April 12, 1965) was a Swedish track and field athlete who competed in the 1912 Summer Olympics. In 1912, he finished 15th in the triple jump competition. He also participated in the long jump event and finished twentieth.
