= François Mahy =

Belgian high jumper

Personal information
- Nationality: Belgian
- Born: 26 October 1898

Sport
- Sport: Athletics
- Event: High jump

François Mahy (born 26 October 1898, date of death unknown) was a Belgian athlete. He competed in the men's high jump at the 1920 Summer Olympics.
