= Gustaf Lindblom (athlete) =

Athletics competitor

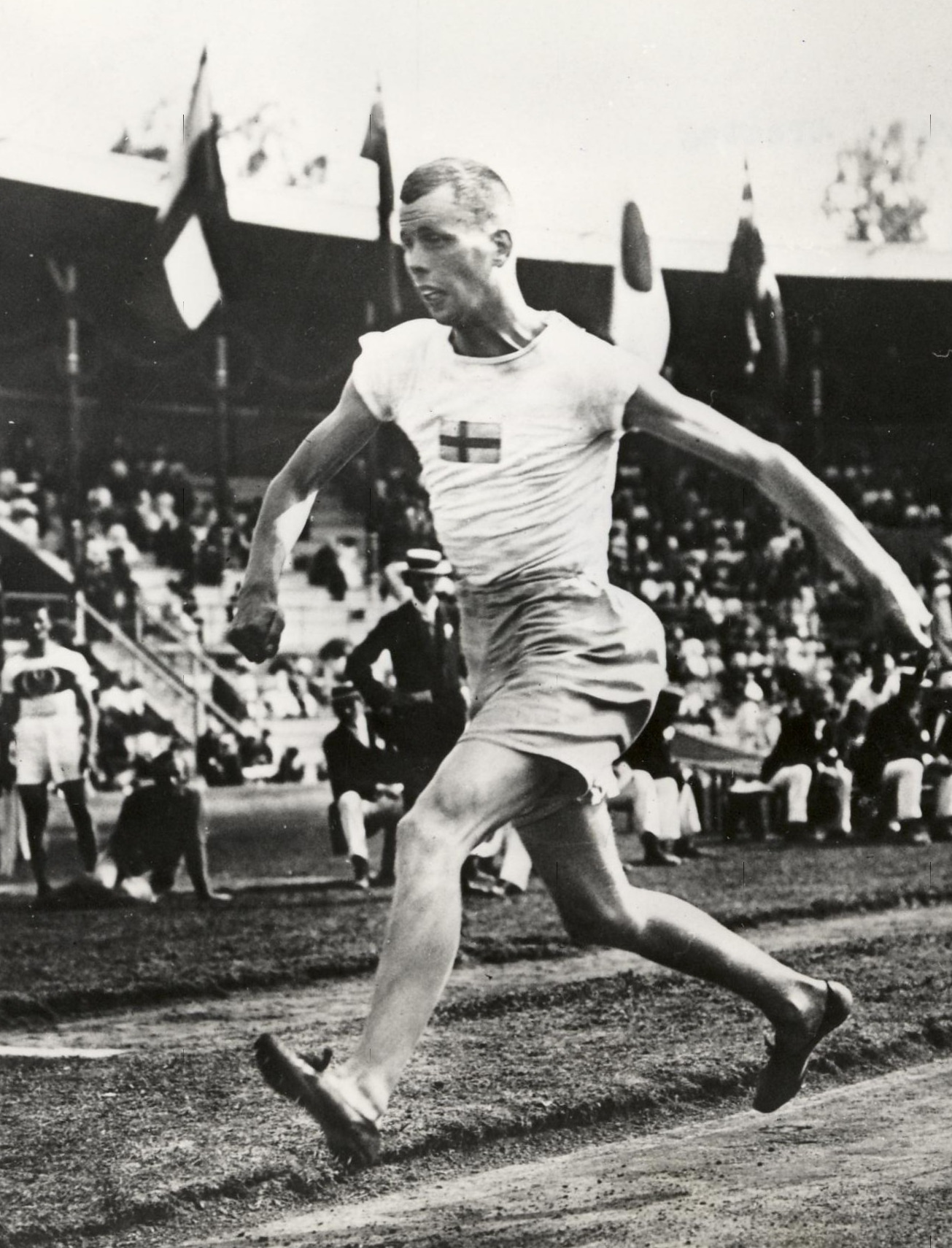
- Gustaf Lindblom at the 1912 Olympics

Personal information
- Nationality: Swedish
- Born: 3 December 1891 Kristinehamn, Sweden
- Died: 26 April 1960 (aged 68) Stockholm, Sweden
- Height: 1.86 m (6 ft 1 in)
- Weight: 80 kg (176 lb)
- Parents: Johan Valdemar Lindblom, Sara Eugenia Örnberg

Sport
- Country: Sweden
- Sport: Triple jump
- Club: IFK Norrköping
Medal record
Representing Sweden
Olympic Games
Gold medal – first place	1912 Stockholm	Triple jump

Gustaf "Topsy" Lindblom (3 December 1891 – 26 April 1960) was a Swedish athlete who won the triple jump event at the 1912 Summer Olympics held in Stockholm, Sweden.

He also headed the editorial office of the sport magazine Idrottsbladet 1915–1934, was secretary of the Swedish Boxing Federation 1921–1929 and 1932–35, was the Swedish boxer Olle Tandberg's manager 1940 and CEO of the famous dance palace Nalen in Stockholm 1933–1960.
