= Folke Jansson =

Swedish triple jumper

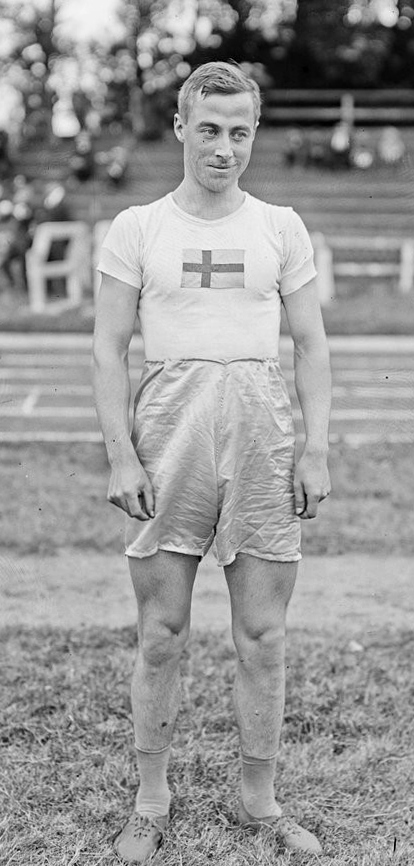
- Folke Jansson at the 1920 Olympics

Personal information
- Born: 23 April 1897 Jönköping, Sweden
- Died: 18 July 1965 (aged 68) Gothenburg, Sweden
- Height: 1.87 m (6 ft 2 in)
- Weight: 80 kg (180 lb)

Sport
- Sport: Athletics
- Events: Triple jump, hurdles
- Club: Örgryte IS, Göteborg

Achievements and titles
- Personal bests: TJ – 15.09 m (1920); 110 mH – 16.7 (1917)
Medal record
Representing Sweden
Olympic Games
Silver medal – second place	1920 Antwerp	Triple jump

Folke Georg "Pytta" Jansson (23 April 1897 – 18 July 1965) was a Swedish athlete who specialized in the triple jump.

== career ==
Janson competed at the 1920 and 1924 Olympics and finished in second and fifth place, respectively.

Jansson won seven Swedish triple jump titles, in 1917 and 1919–24, and held the Swedish record from 1918 to 1931. Jansson won the British AAA Championships title in the triple jump event at the 1921 AAA Championships.

He worked as an insurance clerk in Gothenburg.
