= Thorvig Svahn =

Swedish high jumper

Thorvig Svahn (July 5, 1893 – September 8, 1942) was a Swedish track and field athlete who competed in the 1920 Summer Olympics. In 1920 he finished ninth in the high jump competition.
