= Erik Abrahamsson =

Swedish athlete

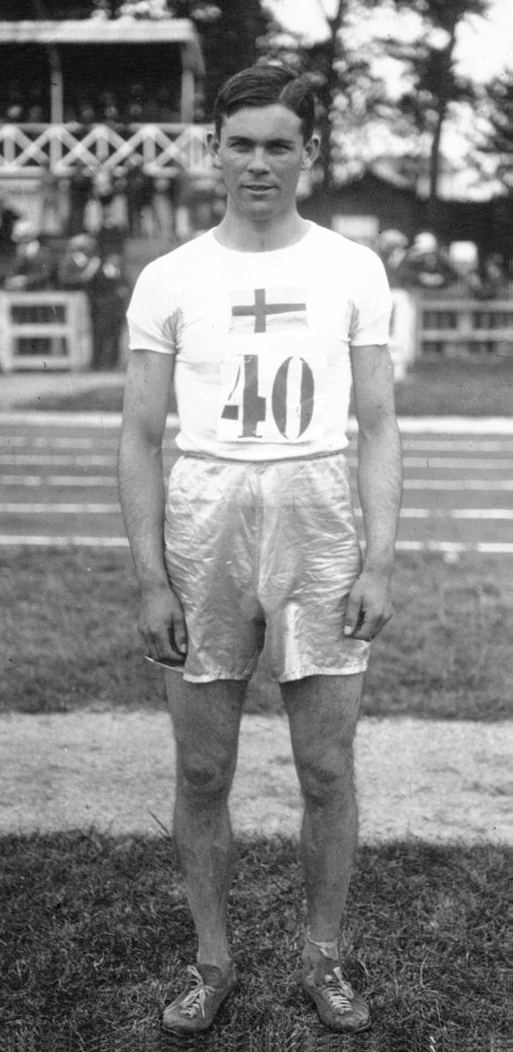
- Erik Abrahamsson in 1920

Personal information
- Born: 28 January 1898 Södertälje, Sweden
- Died: 19 May 1965 (aged 67) Södertälje, Sweden
- Height: 1.72 m (5 ft 8 in)
- Weight: 61 kg (134 lb)

Sport
- Sport: Athletics
- Events: Long jump, triple jump, 110 m hurdles, decathlon
- Club: Södertälje SK

Achievements and titles
- Personal bests: LJ – 7.12 m (1923); TJ – 14.26 m (1924); 110 mH – 16.8 (1917); Decathlon – 6143 (1917)
Medal record
Representing Sweden
Athletics
Olympic Games
Bronze medal – third place	1920 Antwerp	Long jump
Ice hockey
European Championships
Gold medal – first place	1921 Stockholm	Team competition

Erik Adolf Efraim "Erik Aber" Abrahamsson (28 January 1898 – 19 May 1965) was a Swedish athlete. He won the national long jump title in 1921–1923 and a bronze medal at the 1920 Summer Olympics. He was also an acclaimed bandy and ice hockey player, part of the Swedish team that won the 1921 European Championships.

In 1914, Abrahamsson started playing bandy with Södertälje SK (SSK). Later, he took up ice hockey in 1921 and played with AIK, IFK Stockholm, and the Swedish national ice hockey team, winning the Ice Hockey European Championship 1921. Together with his elder brother Carl, Abrahamsson managed to convince the Södertälje SK board of directors to incorporate ice hockey in the club in 1925. The club is still a major team in Sweden's major league, Elitserien. Later, in the same year 1925, SSK played in the Swedish championship final for the first time, and SSK won the title as Swedish champions, with Abrahamsson in the team, and after his brother scored the game-winning goal against Västerås SK.
