= Johan Johannesen =

Norwegian long jumper

Johan Johannesen (20 April 1898 – 30 September 1979) was a Norwegian track and field athlete who competed in the 1920 Summer Olympics. In 1920 he finished tenth in the long jump competition.
