= William Kennedy (high jumper) =

Canadian high jumper (1899–1992)

Personal information
- Born: 3 November 1899 Waterloo, Quebec, Canada
- Died: 2 October 1992 (aged 92) Rawdon, Quebec, Canada

Sport
- Sport: Athletics
- Event: High jump

William Roland Kennedy (3 November 1899 – 2 October 1992) was a Canadian athlete. He competed in the men's high jump at the 1920 Summer Olympics.
