= František Stejskal =

Czech athlete

Personal information
- Nationality: Czech
- Born: 7 December 1895 Prague, Austria-Hungary
- Died: 27 February 1975 (aged 79)

Sport
- Sport: Athletics
- Events: Triple jump High jump

František Stejskal (7 December 1895 – 27 February 1975) was a Czech athlete. He competed in the men's triple jump and the men's high jump at the 1920 Summer Olympics.
