= John Murphy (high jumper) =

American high jumper

John Leonard Murphy (March 23, 1895 – August 17, 1972) was an American track and field athlete who competed in the 1920 Summer Olympics. He was born in Portland, Oregon and died in Midland, Michigan. In 1920, he finished fifth in the high jump competition.

Competing for the Notre Dame Fighting Irish track and field team, Murphy won the 1921 and 1922 NCAA Track and Field Championships national titles in the high jump.
