= Charles Guézille =

French long jumper

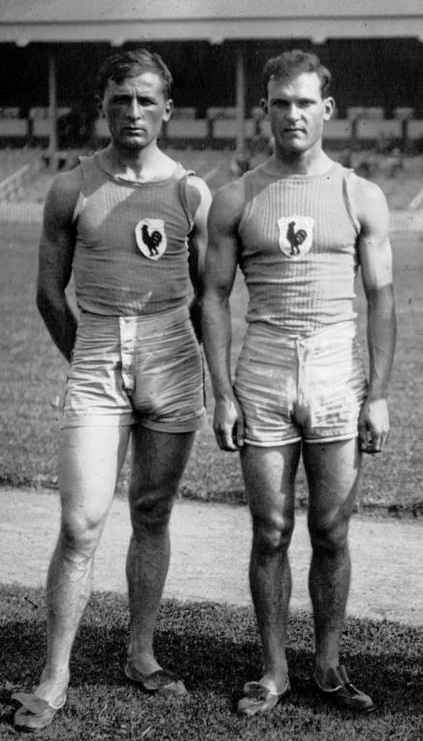
- Guézille (left) in 1920

Personal information
- Born: 3 June 1899 Bécherel, France
- Died: 20 June 1964 (aged 65) Châlons-en-Champagne, France
- Height: 173 cm (5 ft 8 in)

Sport
- Sport: Athletics
- Club: Union Sportive Le Mans

Charles Guézille (3 June 1899 – 20 June 1964) was a French long jumper. He competed at the 1920 Summer Olympics and finished 27th.
