= Alice Lord (diver) =

American diver

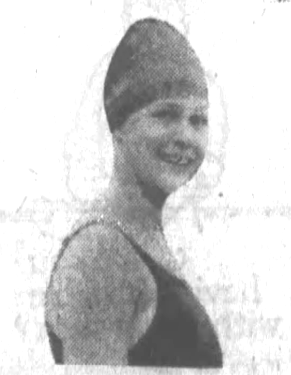

Personal information
- Born: February 4, 1902; Philadelphia, Pennsylvania United States
- Died: July 13, 2000 (aged 98); Ormond Beach, Florida, United States

Sport
- Sport: Diving

Alice Harlekinden Lord (later Landon, February 4, 1902 – July 13, 2000) was an American diver who competed in the 1920 Summer Olympics. She was married to Olympic gold medalist Richmond Landon, who she met on the trip to the Olympics. She is a member of the International Swimming Hall of Fame.

== Early life ==
Lord was born on February 4, 1902, in Philadelphia, Pennsylvania. Lord's father was a lawyer. Her family was described as having "revered physical fitness and sports". She was given swimming lessons age of five. She graduated from Erasmus Hall High School in Brooklyn.

== Athletic and Olympic career ==
At the age of 13, Lord swam across the Long Island Sound for nine miles. She competed in major swimming events in 1917. At the age of 17, she entered her first diving competition.

Lord joined the Women's Swimming Association of New York where she dealt with "primitive" equipment for diving, as the practice pools lacked adequate depth. There, she, Ethelda Bleibtrey, Charlotte Boyle, and Leslie Bunyan were the first to swim a 400-yard freestyle relay in under five minutes.

Besides swimming and diving, Lord also trained for horseback riding, walking long distances, and rifle shooting.

Lord qualified for the 1920 Summer Olympics after trying out on Coney Island. Including Lord, six of the fifteen members of the Olympic swimming team were members of the Women's Swimming Association of New York. At the Olympics, Lord participated in the plain high diving event. At the time, the women's team had no swimming or diving coaches, resulting in female athletes coaching themselves. She was a member of the first Olympic women's swimming team representing the United States but failed to qualify in the final round after scoring the least in her heat at 118.5 points.

After the Olympics, Lord continued to be involved in swimming. She taught swimming at Long Beach, New York. From 1924 to 1936, she held the starting pistol for women's swimming events at the United States Olympic trials. She also helped design Olympic uniforms as a member of the Olympic Apparel Committee. She served as the head chaperone for the United States team at the 1967 Pan American Games.

The International Swimming Hall of Fame inducted her in 1993. Her induction ceremony was carried out by Donna de Varona.

During the 1984 Summer Olympics, she led the procession for the United States team while wearing a replica of her 1920 uniform.

For the 1996 Summer Olympics, Lord participated in the torch relay by carrying the torch through Daytona Beach, Florida.

== Personal life ==
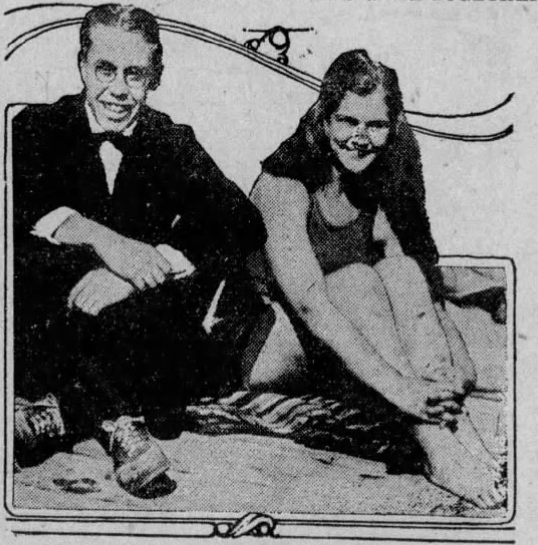
Alice and Richmond in 1921

Lord met her future husband Richmond Landon on the ship headed towards the 1920 Olympics. They married two years later, and they remained together until he died in 1971. They had two children.

Lord died in her home at the age of 98 on July 13, 2000. Before she died, she was at the time the oldest living female American Olympian.

== See also ==
- List of members of the International Swimming Hall of Fame
