= Gustave Remoué =

French athletics competitor

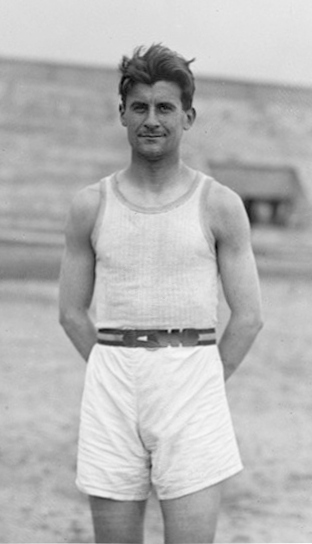
- Remoué in 1920

Personal information
- Born: 25 December 1900
- Died: 12 April 1924 (aged 23)

Sport
- Sport: Athletics
- Event: Triple jump
- Club: CSJB Angers

Gustave Remoué (25 December 1900 – 12 April 1924) was a French triple jumper. He competed at the 1920 Summer Olympics and placed 19th.
