= Albert Gutterson =

American long jumper

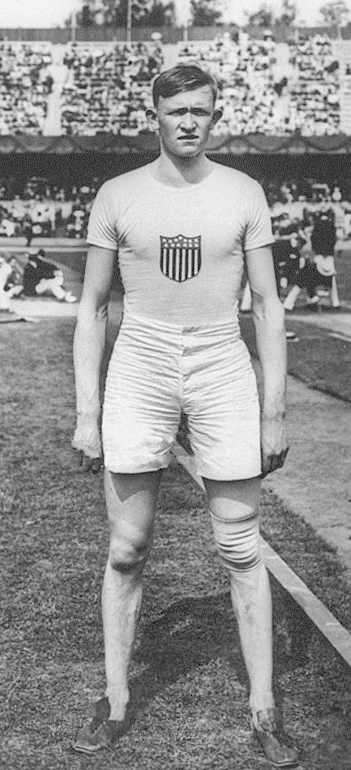
- Albert Gutterson at the 1912 Olympics

Personal information
- Born: Albert Lovejoy Gutterson; August 23, 1887 Andover, Vermont, U.S.
- Died: April 7, 1965 (aged 77) Burlington, Vermont, U.S.
- Resting place: Summer Hill Cemetery, Springfield, Vermont, U.S.
- Education: University of Vermont
- Height: 1.85 m (6 ft 1 in)
- Weight: 82 kg (181 lb)

Sport
- Country: United States
- Sport: Track and Field
- Event: Long jump
- Club: Boston Athletic Association

Achievements and titles
- Olympic finals: 1912
- Personal best: 7.60 m (1912)
Medal record
Representing the United States
Olympic Games
Gold medal – first place	1912 Stockholm	Long jump

Albert Lovejoy Gutterson (August 23, 1887 – April 7, 1965) was an American athlete who won a gold medal in the long jump at the 1912 Summer Olympics. Gutterson also set a new Olympic record of 7.60 meters at this event.

Gutterson was born in Andover, Vermont and raised in Springfield. He attended the University of Vermont, from which he graduated in 1912, and where he was a standout in track and field. The university's athletic complex, Gutterson Fieldhouse, home to the Catamount men's and women's hockey teams, is named after him. Sports Illustrated ranked him fifth on its Top 50 Vermont athletes of the 20th century, and he is an original inductee of the University of Vermont Hall of Fame and Vermont Sports Hall of Fame.

Gutterson was an engineer by education. He worked for the Jones and Lamson Machine Co. and then in the petroleum industry from 1925 to 1950. From 1950 to 1963, he served as president of Lovejoy Tool Company, founded by his uncle.
