= Rolf Franksson =

Swedish long jumper

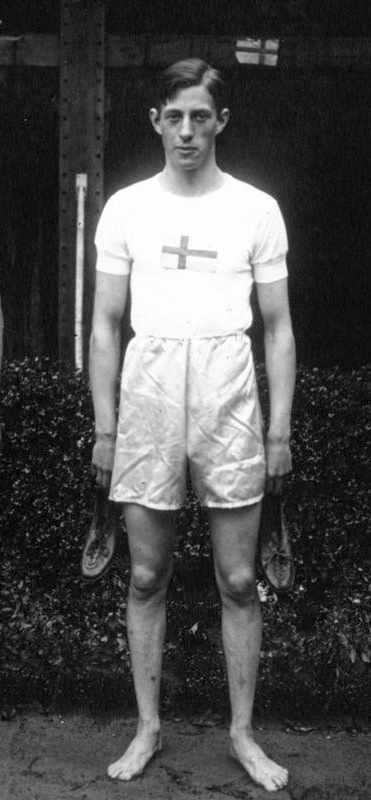
- Franksson in 1920

Personal information
- Born: 29 August 1900 Ockelbo, Sweden
- Died: 14 September 1971 (aged 71) Ockelbo, Sweden

Sport
- Sport: Athletics
- Event: Long jump
- Club: IFK Gävle

Achievements and titles
- Personal best: LJ – 6.95 m (1921)

Olof Emil Rolf Franksson (29 August 1900 – 14 September 1971) was a Swedish long jumper. He competed at the 1920 Summer Olympics and finished sixth.
