= Homer Baker =

American middle-distance runner (1893–1977)

Personal information
- Nationality: American
- Born: June 8, 1893 Buffalo, New York, U.S.
- Died: November 25, 1977 (aged 84) Williamsport, Pennsylvania, U.S.

Sport
- Country: United States
- Sport: Runner

Achievements and titles
- National finals: US Champion, Half-mile(1913 and 1914), British Champion, 880-yards(1914)

Homer Baker (June 8, 1893 – November 25, 1977) was an American middle-distance track and field athlete.

== Career ==
Baker became US national half-mile champion in 1913 and 1914.

Baker toured Europe during 1914 and won the British AAA Championships title in the 880 yards event at the 1914 AAA Championships, beating the famed Albert Hill. At the same championships he finished third behind Cyril Seedhouse in the 440 yards event.

Baker had poor eyesight and withdrew from running for 18 months after a 1917 accident in the New York City Subway. He did the 880 yards (half-mile) in 1,56,4 and 660 yards in 1,20,4 (world record holding up for 26 years). In 1923, he was appointed physical director in the Panama Canal Zone. Baker was a cousin of silent film star Clara Bow.
