= Marcel Orfidan =

French long jumper

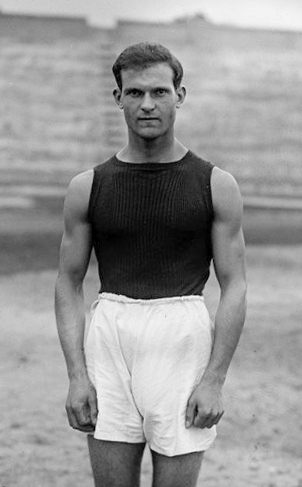
- Orfidan in 1920

Personal information
- Born: 8 April 1897 Izernore, France
- Died: 21 August 1979 (aged 82) Oyonnax, France

Sport
- Sport: Athletics
- Club: Club Sportive Oyonnax

Marcel Lucien Orfidan (8 April 1897 – 21 August 1979) was a French long jumper. He competed at the 1920 Summer Olympics and finished 14th.
