= Richmond Landon =

American high jumper (1898–1971)

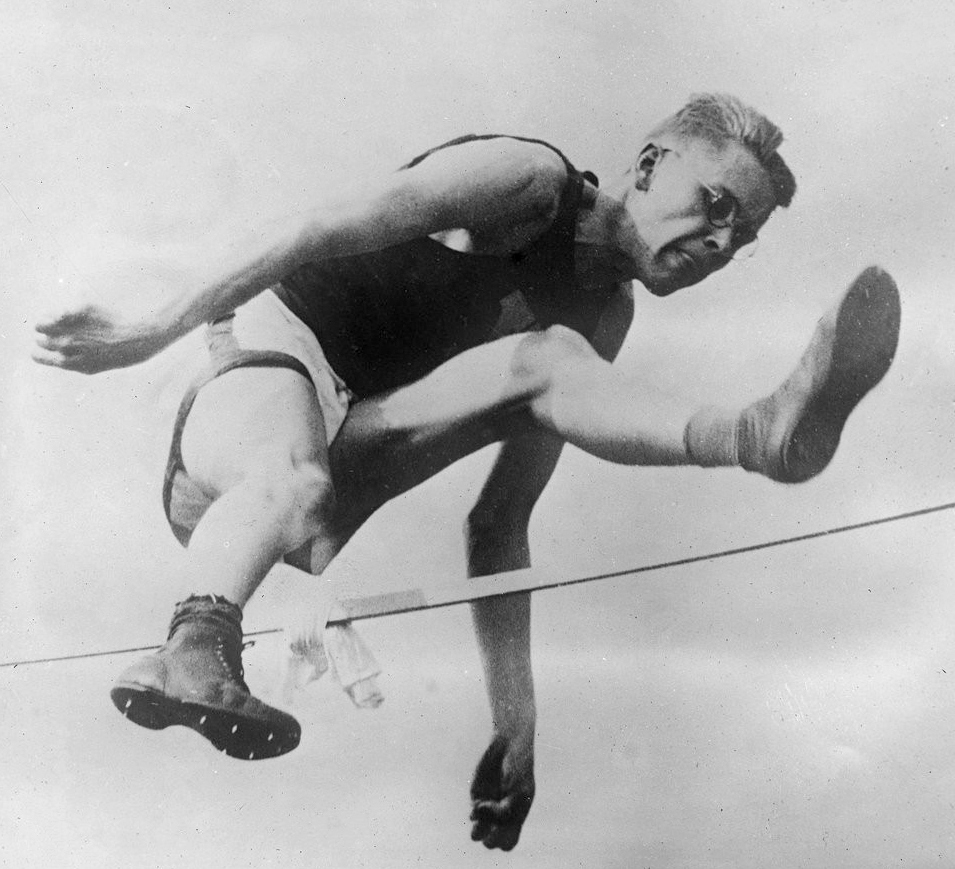
- Richmond Landon in 1920

Personal information
- Born: November 20, 1898 Salisbury, Connecticut, United States
- Died: June 13, 1971 (aged 72) Lynbrook, New York, United States
- Education: Yale University
- Height: 1.88 m (6 ft 2 in)
- Weight: 73 kg (161 lb)

Sport
- Sport: Athletics
- Event: High jump
- Club: NYAC, New York

Achievements and titles
- Personal best: 1.98 m (1921)
Medal record
Representing the United States
Olympic Games
| Gold medal – first place | 1920 Antwerp | High jump |

Richmond Wilcox Landon (November 20, 1898 – June 13, 1971) was an American high jumper who won a gold medal for the United States at the 1920 Summer Olympics.

Landon attended the Hotchkiss School in Connecticut and Yale University. In 1922, he married Alice Lord, an Olympic diver he met on the boat to the 1920 Olympics.

== Early life and domestic career ==
Landon was born on November 20, 1898, in Salisbury, Connecticut. His father was an attorney. When he lived in Salisbury, he took an interest in golf and fishing. Additionally, he played baseball as a shortstop. He began to wear glasses as a result of a baseball injury where a baseball collided with his head between his eyes. Landon attended Hotchkiss School, where he began to take an interest in jumping.

Landon earned a spot among the Yale Bulldogs' varsity team in his sophomore year. In 1917, he broke the Connecticut high jump record at 5 feet 9.5 inches (1.765 m). He joined the New York Athletic Club in 1919.

His personal best high jump height, 6 feet 6 inches (1.98 m), was set in 1921. Additionally, Landon set the world indoor record for the high jump at 6 feet 5.5 inches (1.969 m) in 1923.

== Olympic career ==
Landon competed at the high jump at the 1920 Olympics. Conditions were described as poor due to newly laid grass. In the qualifying round, he jumped 1.80 metres (5 ft 11 in) to advance to the final round. In the final, three jumpers, including him, cleared 1.90 metres (6 ft 3 in), which Landon accomplished on his second attempt. Landon cleared an Olympic record 1.94 metres (6 ft 4 in) on his second attempt, which he was the only one to clear, resulting in a first-place finish. King Albert I of Belgium congratulated him for his victory.

During the 1928 Summer Olympics, Landon helped coach the women's high jump team.

Later in his life, Landon continued to do organizational work for the Olympics. Additionally, he was one of five people who organized the U.S. Olympians, a group focused on youth participation and public interest.

== Personal life ==
Landon worked as an advertising executive. He worked for McCall's magazine. Additionally, Landon was an amateur competition official. He served as the commissioner of the Amateur Athletic Union of Nassau County, New York.

Landon met his wife, Alice Landon, aboard a ship headed for the 1920 Olympics. The couple married two years later, and had two children. He and his wife participated in public speaking in order to fundraise for the United States Olympic Committee. They were still married at the time of his death.

Landon appeared as a contestant on the CBS television program, I've Got a Secret, on the October 13, 1954 episode.

Landon died at the age of 72 in his home on June 13, 1971, after a "short illness".
