= Alice Lord (union organizer) =

American labor leader

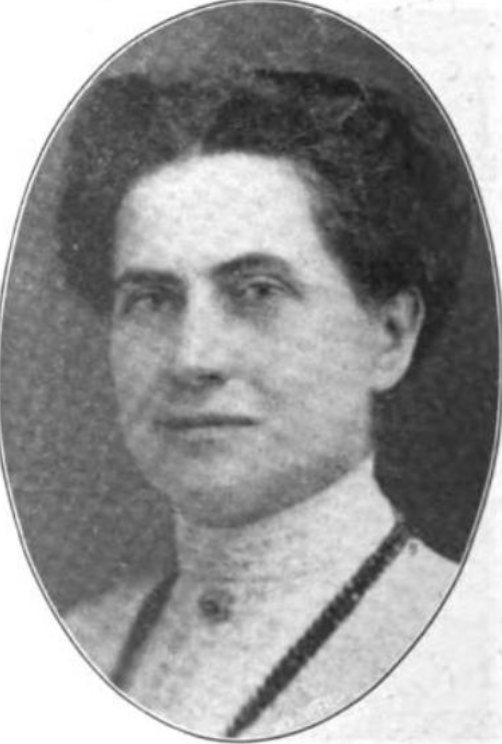
- Lord, from a 1914 publication
- Born: 1877; Lordville, New York, U.S.
- Died: 1940 (aged 62–63)
- Other name: Alice Lord Dunn
- Occupation: Labor organizer

Alice M. Lord Dunn (about 1877 – March 9, 1940) was a Seattle union organizer, important in the advancement of Seattle's women-led unions in the early 1900s.

Lord was born in Lordville, New York and moved to Seattle in her twenties. She led the successful efforts to establish the eight-hour day and the $10 per week minimum wage for Washington women in 1913. She led the Waitresses Union for 40 of the 73 years of its existence. Lord also helped organize other women workers in Seattle and nearby Washington cities, including domestic, garment, and candy and cracker makers as well as the Seattle Union Card and Label League.

Lord married Walter Chase Dunn in 1931. She died in 1940, in her sixties, in Seattle.
