= Ivar Sahlin =

Swedish triple and high jumper

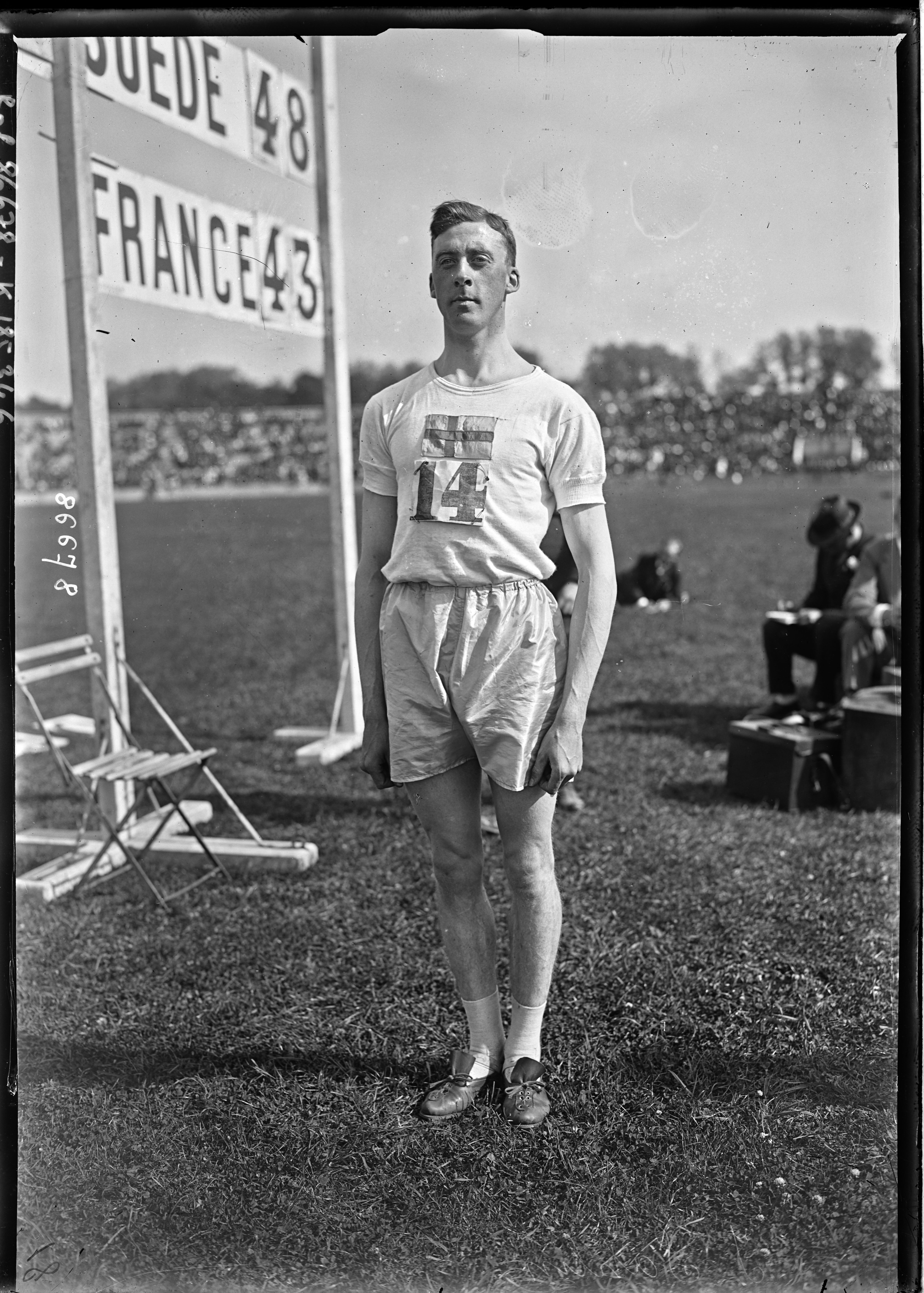

Personal information
- Born: 16 December 1895 Sundsvall, Västernorrland, Sweden
- Died: 24 November 1980 (aged 84) Sigtuna, Stockholm, Sweden

Sport
- Sport: Athletics
- Event: high jump/triple jump
- Club: IFK Sundsvall

Ivar Sahlin (16 December 1895 – 24 November 1980) was a Swedish track and field athlete who competed in the 1920 Summer Olympics and in the 1924 Summer Olympics.

== Career ==
Sahlin born in Sundsvall, won the British AAA Championships title in the triple jump event at the 1914 AAA Championships.

At the 1920 Olympic Games, Sahlin finished fourth in the triple jump competition. Four years later, at the 1924 Olympic Games, he was eliminated in the qualification of the triple jump competition and finished eighth overall. In the high jump event, he was also eliminated in the qualification and finished tenth overall.

He died in Sigtuna.
