= René Labat =

French athlete

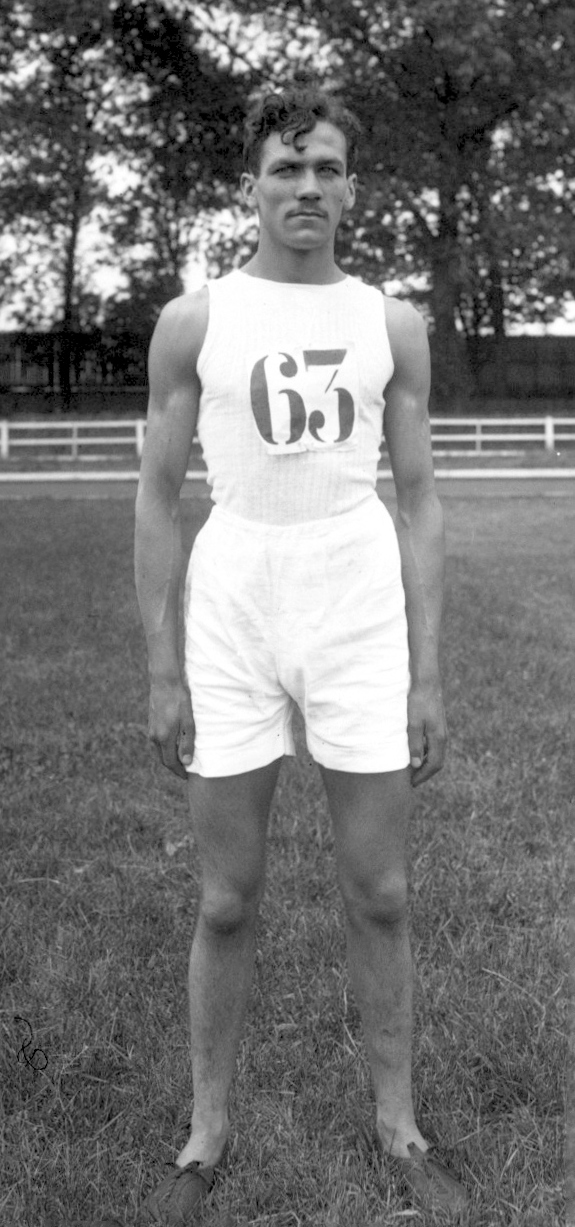
- René Labat in 1911

Personal information
- Born: 19 February 1892 Hendaye, France
- Died: 8 March 1970 (aged 78) Paris, France

Sport
- Sport: Athletics
- Event: High jump
- Club: Stade Bordelais

Achievements and titles
- Personal best: 1.86 m (1920)

Jean René Labat (19 February 1892 – 8 March 1970) was a French high jumper. He competed at the 1920 Summer Olympics and finished in ninth place.
