= Nils Fixdal =

Norwegian long and triple jumper

Nils Fixdal (20 November 1889 – 11 October 1972) was a Norwegian athlete who specialized in long jump and triple jump. He represented Haugesund IL. He was the brother of Knut Fixdal.

At the 1912 Summer Olympics, he finished thirteenth in the long jump final with a jump of 6.71 metres and eighth in the triple jump with 13.96 metres. He became Norwegian champion in long jump in 1912 and in triple jump in 1910 and 1913.

His personal best jump was 6.86 metres, achieved in July 1911 in Haugesund. He had a personal best of 14.34 metres in the triple jump, achieved in July 1913 in Haugesund.
