= Erling Vinne =

Norwegian triple jumper

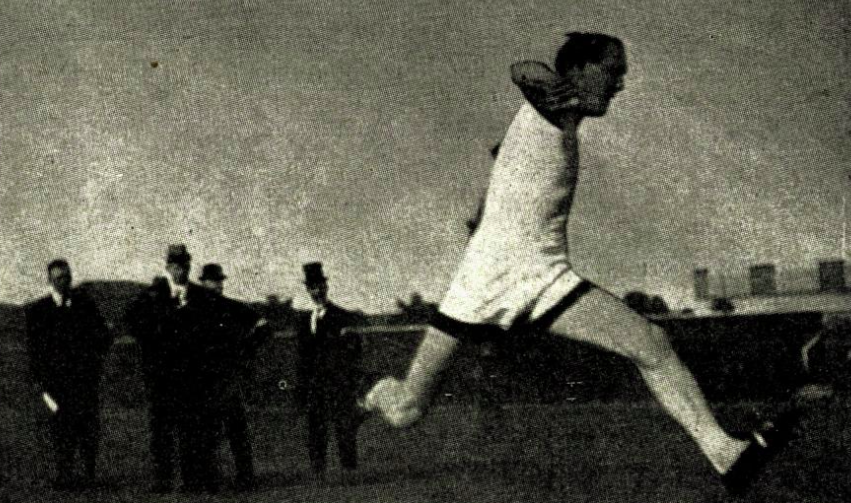
Vinne jumps 14.65 meters on 23 September 1917, his longest ever.

Erling Vinne (7 August 1892 – 20 June 1963) was a Norwegian triple jumper. He represented IK Tjalve.

At the 1912 Summer Olympics, he finished fourth in the triple jump final with a jump of 14.14 metres. At the 1920 Summer Olympics, he finished thirteenth with 13.34 metres. He became Norwegian champion in 1912, 1914 and 1917-1919.

His personal best jump was 14.65 metres, achieved on 23 September 1917 in Kristiania.
