= Charles Courtin =

French long jumper

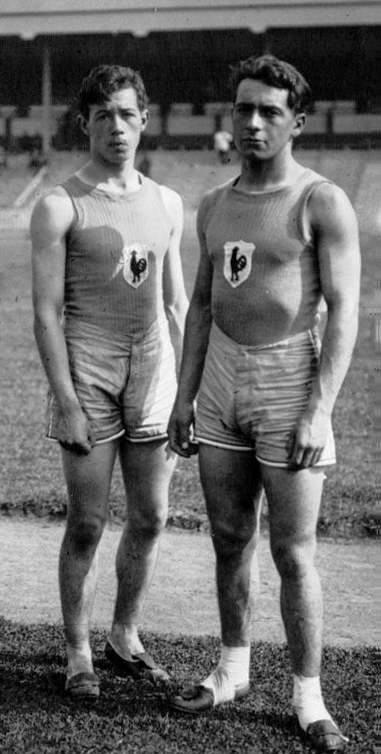
- Courtin (left) in 1920

Personal information
- Born: 6 May 1902 Angers, France
- Died: 23 December 1985 (aged 83) Cognac, France

Sport
- Sport: Athletics
- Club: SCC Atlantique, Nantes

Charles Courtin (6 May 1902 – 23 December 1985) was a French long jumper. He competed at the 1920 Summer Olympics and finished 17th. He was killed in action during World War II.
