= Étienne Proux =

French athletics competitor

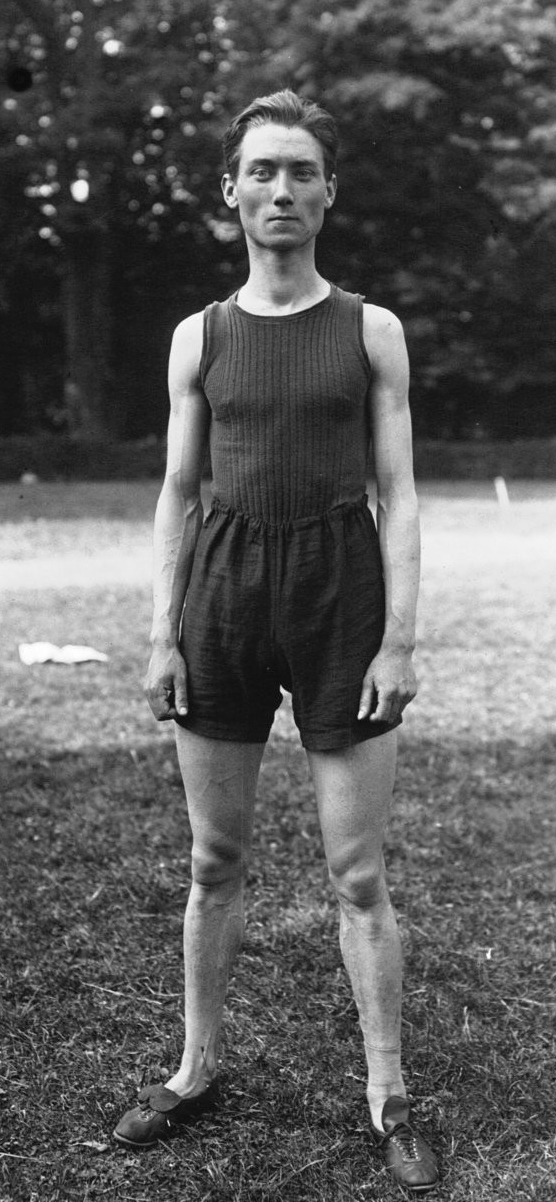
- Proux in 1919

Personal information
- Born: 19 April 1897 Bordeaux, France
- Died: 24 April 1983 (aged 86) Toulouse, France
- Height: 179 cm (5 ft 10 in)

Sport
- Sport: Athletics
- Event: Triple jump
- Club: Stade français, Paris

Achievements and titles
- Personal best: 13.32 m (1919)

Étienne Proux (19 April 1897 – 24 April 1983) was a French triple jumper. He competed at the 1920 Summer Olympics and finished 16th.
