= Hans Jagenburg =

Swedish high jumper

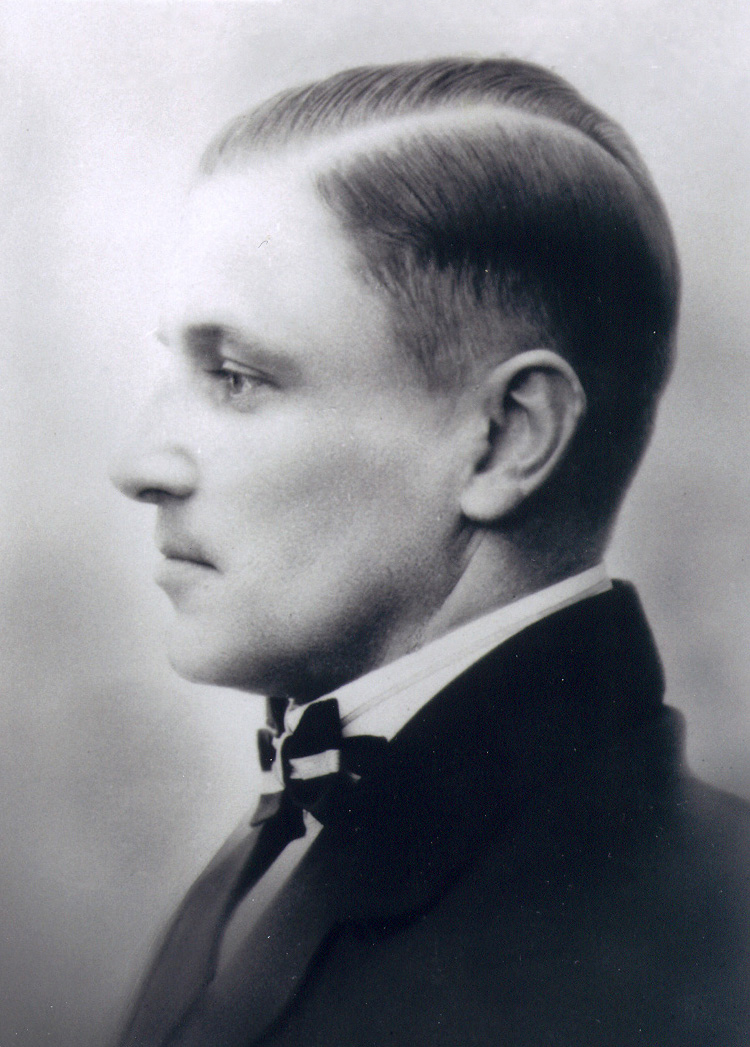

Personal information
- Born: 18 August 1894 Rydboholm, Sweden
- Died: 5 January 1971 (aged 76) Borås, Sweden
- Height: 1.66 m (5 ft 5 in)
- Weight: 62 kg (137 lb)

Sport
- Sport: Athletics
- Event(s): High jump, pole vault
- Club: Turnverein Frankfurt-Ried, Frankfurt am Main

Achievements and titles
- Personal best(s): HJ – 1.86 m (1918); PV – 3.50 m (1917)

Hans Rudolf Jagenburg (18 August 1894 – 5 January 1971) was a Swedish high jumper. He competed at the 1920 Summer Olympics and finished in ninth place.

Nationally, Jagenburg won two titles, in 1913 and 1922. In 1918, he won the Scandinavian triangular meet and was ranked fifth in the world.
