= Eugène Coulon (athlete) =

French long jumper

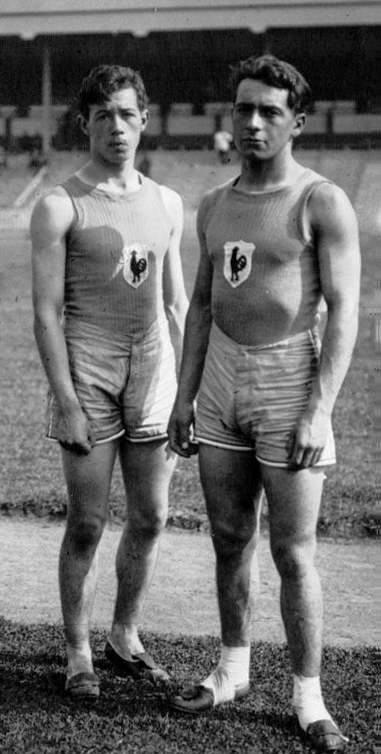
- Coulon (right) in 1920

Personal information
- Born: 2 June 1899 Béziers, France
- Died: 8 February 1969 (aged 69) France

Sport
- Sport: Athletics
- Club: Association Sportive Béziers

Achievements and titles
- Personal best: 6.72 (1920)

Eugène Coulon (2 June 1899 – 8 February 1969) was a French long jumper. He competed at the 1920 Summer Olympics and finished 11th.
