= Finland at the 1920 Summer Olympics =

- IOC code: FIN
- NOC: Finnish Olympic Committee

in Antwerp
- Competitors: 63 (62 men, 1 woman) in 9 sports
- Flag bearer: Emil Hagelberg
- Medals Ranked 4th: Gold 15 Silver 10 Bronze 9 Total 34

Summer Olympics appearances (overview)
- 1908; 1912; 1920; 1924; 1928; 1932; 1936; 1948; 1952; 1956; 1960; 1964; 1968; 1972; 1976; 1980; 1984; 1988; 1992; 1996; 2000; 2004; 2008; 2012; 2016; 2020; 2024; 2028

Other related appearances
- 1906 Intercalated Games

Finland competed at the 1920 Summer Olympics in Antwerp, Belgium for the first time as a fully independent state under its own flag. It competed independently in 1908 and 1912 as the autonomous Grand Duchy of Finland within the Russian Empire. 63 competitors, 62 men and 1 woman, took part in 51 events in 9 sports.

== Medalists ==
=== Gold ===
- Athletics
  - Men's 10000 m: Paavo Nurmi
  - Men's cross country individual: Paavo Nurmi
  - Men's cross country team: Frederick Teudor Koskenniemi, Heikki Liimatainen, Paavo Nurmi
  - Men's discus throw: Elmer Konstantin Niklander
  - Men's javelin throw: Jonni Myyrä
  - Men's marathon: Hannes Kolehmainen
  - Men's pentathlon: Eero Reino Lehtonen
  - Men's shot put: Frans Wilhelmi Pörhölä
  - Men's triple jump: Vilho Immanuel Tuulos
- Figure skating (on ice)
  - Mixed pairs: Ludowika Jakobsson, Walter Jakobsson
- Wrestling
  - Men's freestyle 60–67.5 kg (lightweight): Kalle Anttila
  - Men's freestyle 67.5–75 kg (middleweight): Eino Aukusti Leino
  - Men's Greco-Roman +82 kg (super heavyweight): Adolf Valentin Lindfors
  - Men's Greco-Roman -60 kg (featherweight): Oskar David Friman
  - Men's Greco-Roman 60–67.5 kg (lightweight): Eemil Ernesti Väre

=== Silver ===
- Athletics
  - Men's 5000 m: Paavo Nurmi
  - Men's discus throw: Armas Rudolf Taipale
  - Men's javelin throw: Urho Pellervo Peltonen
  - Men's shot put: Elmer Konstantin Niklander
- Shooting
  - Men's team, 100 m running deer, single shot: Yrjö Kolho, Kaarlo Kustaa Lappalainen, Robert Tikkanen, Nestori Toivonen, Magnus Wegelius
- Wrestling
  - Men's freestyle 67.5–75 kg (middleweight): Väinö Penttala
  - Men's Greco-Roman -60 kg (featherweight): Heikki Kähkönen
  - Men's Greco-Roman 60–67.5 kg (lightweight): Taavi Tamminen
  - Men's Greco-Roman 67.5–75 kg (middleweight): Arthur Lindfors
  - Men's Greco-Roman 75–82 kg (light-heavyweight): Edil Rosenqvist

=== Bronze ===
- Athletics
  - Men's cross country individual: Heikki Liimatainen
  - Men's javelin throw: Paavo Jaale-Johansson
  - Men's pentathlon: Hugo Jalmari Lahtinen
- Shooting
  - Men's team, 100 m running deer, double shots: Yrjö Kolho, Robert Tikkanen, Nestori Toivonen, Vilho Vauhkonen, Magnus Wegelius
  - Men's team 300 m free rifle, prone: Voitto Waldemar Kolho, Kaarlo Kustaa Lappalainen, Veli Nieminen, Vilho Vauhkonen, Magnus Wegelius
- Swimming
  - Men's 200 m breaststroke: Arvo Ossian Aaltonen
  - Men's 400 m breaststroke: Arvo Ossian Aaltonen
- Wrestling
  - Men's Greco-Roman + 82 kg (super heavyweight): Martti Nieminen
  - Men's Greco-Roman 67.5–75 kg (middleweight): Matti Perttilä

== Aquatics ==
=== Diving ===
Three divers, all men, represented Finland in 1920. It was the nation's third appearance in the sport. Valkama was the only diver to advance to a final, placing fifth in the plain high diving. This result matched Finland's best diving result to date.

Men

Ranks given are within the semifinal group.

Diver	Event	Semifinals			Final		
Diver	Event	Points	Score	Rank	Points	Score	Rank
Kalle Kainuvaara	10 m platform	35	356.80	7	did not advance		
Kalle Kainuvaara	Plain high dive	15	160.0	4	did not advance		
Lauri Kyöstilä	10 m platform	21	441.80	4	did not advance		
Yrjö Valkama	Plain high dive	14	157.0	3 Q	23	167.5	5

=== Swimming ===
A single swimmer represented Finland in 1920. It was the nation's third appearance in the sport as well as the Olympics. Aaltonen won bronze medals in both of his breaststroke events. They were Finland's first Olympic swimming medals; Aaltonen had been the first Finn to advance to a swimming event final.

Ranks given are within the heat.

Men

Swimmer	Event	Quarterfinals		Semifinals		Final	
Swimmer	Event	Result	Rank	Result	Rank	Result	Rank
Arvo Aaltonen	200 m breast	3:11.6	2 Q	3:12.4	2 Q	3:12.2	3rd place, bronze medalist(s)
Arvo Aaltonen	400 m breast	6:50.0	2 Q	6:45.0	1 Q	6:48.0	3rd place, bronze medalist(s)

== Athletics ==
26 athletes represented Finland in 1920. It was the nation's third appearance in athletics, a sport in which Finland had competed each time the country appeared at the Olympics. The Finnish team garnered nine gold medals, matching the United States for the most in that category. With only about a quarter of the number of athletes, however, the Finns could not match the depth of the United States and finished with 13 fewer total medals.

The Finland team's greatest successes came in long distance running events (gold medals in the 10,000 metres, marathon, individual cross country, and team cross country) and throwing events (golds in the discus throw, shot put, and javelin throw—sweeping the medals in the latter). They also took the championships in the triple jump and the pentathlon.

Ranks given are within the heat.

Athlete	Event	Heats		Quarterfinals		Semifinals		Final	
Athlete	Event	Result	Rank	Result	Rank	Result	Rank	Result	Rank
Hannes Kolehmainen	Marathon	N/A						2:32:35.8	1st place, gold medalist(s)
Tatu Kolehmainen	Marathon	N/A						2:44:02.3	10
Teodor Koskenniemi	5000 m	N/A				15:22.0	3 Q	15:17.0	4
Teodor Koskenniemi	Cross country	N/A						27:57.2	6
Heikki Liimatainen	10000 m	N/A				32:08.2	1 Q	32:28.0	7
Heikki Liimatainen	Cross country	N/A						27:37.0	3rd place, bronze medalist(s)
Hannes Miettinen	Cross country	N/A						Unknown	23
Paavo Nurmi	5000 m	N/A				15:33.0	2 Q	15:00.0	2nd place, silver medalist(s)
Paavo Nurmi	10000 m	N/A				33:46.3	2 Q	31:45.8	1st place, gold medalist(s)
Paavo Nurmi	Cross country	N/A						27:15.0	1st place, gold medalist(s)
Eino Rastas	Cross country	N/A						Unknown	18
Oskari Rissanen	3000 m steeplechase	N/A				11:07.5	3 Q	did not start	
Urho Tallgren	Marathon	N/A						2:42:40.0	9
Juho Tuomikoski	Marathon	N/A						2:40:18.8	5
Ilmari Vesamaa	5000 m	N/A				15:54.4	4	did not advance	
Ilmari Vesamaa	3000 m steeplechase	N/A				10:32.2	4	did not advance	
Ilmari Vesamaa	Cross country	N/A						Unknown	14
Valdemar Wickholm	400 m hurdles	N/A		57.9	3	did not advance			
Erik Wilén	400 m	52.0	2 Q	51.0	4	did not advance			
Erik Wilén	400 m hurdles	N/A		58.4	2 Q	Unknown	5	did not advance	
Teodor Koskenniemi; Heikki Liimatainen; Paavo Nurmi	Cross country	N/A						10	1st place, gold medalist(s)

Athlete	Event	Qualifying		Final	
Athlete	Event	Result	Rank	Result	Rank
Pekka Johansson	Javelin throw	63.095	2 Q	63.095	3rd place, bronze medalist(s)
Hugo Lahtinen	Long jump	6.19	19	did not advance	
Eero Lehtonen	Long jump	6.285	16	did not advance	
Jonni Myyrä	Discus throw	37.00	12	did not advance	
Jonni Myyrä	Javelin throw	60.63	3 Q	65.78 OR	1st place, gold medalist(s)
Elmer Niklander	Shot put	14.155	1 Q	14.155	2nd place, silver medalist(s)
Elmer Niklander	Discus throw	44.685	1 Q	44.685	1st place, gold medalist(s)
Elmer Niklander	56 lb weight throw	8.865	8	did not advance	
Ossian Nylund	Triple jump	13.74	7	did not advance	
Urho Peltonen	Javelin throw	63.605 OR	1 Q	63.605	2nd place, silver medalist(s)
Johan Pettersson	Hammer throw	41.76	11	did not advance	
Johan Pettersson	56 lb weight throw	9.375	6 Q	9.375	6
Ville Pörhölä	Shot put	14.035	3 Q	14.81	1st place, gold medalist(s)
Ville Pörhölä	Discus throw	38.19	8	did not advance	
Ville Pörhölä	56 lb weight throw	8.85	9	did not advance	
Jussi Ruoho	Pole vault	3.60	1 Q	3.40	12
Julius Saaristo	Javelin throw	60.045	5 Q	62.395	4
Armas Taipale	Shot put	12.945	10	did not advance	
Armas Taipale	Discus throw	44.19	2 Q	44.19	2nd place, silver medalist(s)
Vilho Tuulos	Triple jump	14.505	1 Q	14.505	1st place, gold medalist(s)

Athlete	Event	Final	
Athlete	Event	Total	Rank
Pekka Johansson	Decathlon	did not finish	
Hugo Lahtinen	Pentathlon	26	3rd place, bronze medalist(s)
Hugo Lahtinen	Decathlon	did not finish	
Eero Lehtonen	Pentathlon	14	1st place, gold medalist(s)
Eero Lehtonen	Decathlon	did not finish	
Jonni Myyrä	Pentathlon	did not finish	
Ossian Nylund	Pentathlon	did not finish	
Valdemar Wickholm	Decathlon	6405.460	6

== Equestrian ==
A single equestrian represented Finland in 1920. It was the nation's debut in the sport. Wilkman competed in the eventing competition, placing 17th.

Equestrian	Horse	Event	Final	
Equestrian	Horse	Event	Result	Rank
Oskar Wilkman	Meno	Eventing	1282.50	17

== Modern pentathlon ==
Two pentathletes represented Finland in 1920. It was the nation's debut in the sport.

A point-for-place system was used, with the lowest total score winning.

Pentathlete	Final						
Pentathlete	Riding	Fencing	Shooting	Swimming	Running	Total	Rank
Emil Alfons Hagelberg	10	3	21	9	8	51	7
Kalle Kainuvaara	did not finish						

== Skating ==
=== Figure skating ===
Three figure skaters represented Finland in 1920. It was the nation's debut in the sport. The Jakobssons, a married couple, won the pairs competition. Ilmanen placed fifth of nine in the men's singles.

Skater	Event	Final	
Skater	Event	Result	Rank
Sakari Ilmanen	Men's singles	30.0	5
Ludowika Jakobsson; Walter Jakobsson	Pairs	7.0	1st place, gold medalist(s)

== Shooting ==
Nine shooters represented Finland in 1920. It was the nation's third appearance in the sport as well as the Olympics. The Finns were looking to improve upon the pair of bronze medals they had won in 1912, which was the country's best result to date. They were successful, taking a silver medal in the team running deer single shots competition as well as another pair of bronzes in other team competitions.

Shooter	Event	Final	
Shooter	Event	Result	Rank
Voitto Kolho	300 m free rifle, 3 pos.	974	7
Yrjö Kolho	100 m deer, single shots	40	4
Kalle Lappalainen	300 m free rifle, 3 pos.	945	Unknown
Veli Nieminen	300 m free rifle, 3 pos.	934	Unknown
Veli Nieminen	Trap	Unknown	
Toivo Tikkanen	100 m deer, single shots	40	5
Vilho Vauhkonen	300 m free rifle, 3 pos.	966	Unknown
Vilho Vauhkonen	300 m military rifle, prone	59	4
Magnus Wegelius	300 m free rifle, 3 pos.	849	Unknown
Magnus Wegelius	300 m military rifle, standing	51	Unknown
Magnus Wegelius	600 m military rifle, prone	51	Unknown
Voitto Kolho; Yrjö Kolho; Frans Nässling; Toivo Tikkanen; Nestor Toivonen	50 m team free pistol	2052	11
Voitto Kolho; Kalle Lappalainen; Veli Nieminen; Vilho Vauhkonen; Magnus Wegelius	Team free rifle	4668	4
Voitto Kolho; Kalle Lappalainen; Veli Nieminen; Vilho Vauhkonen; Magnus Wegelius	300 m team military rifle, prone	281	3rd place, bronze medalist(s)
Voitto Kolho; Kalle Lappalainen; Veli Nieminen; Vilho Vauhkonen; Magnus Wegelius	600 m team military rifle, prone	268	8
Voitto Kolho; Kalle Lappalainen; Veli Nieminen; Vilho Vauhkonen; Magnus Wegelius	300 & 600 m team military rifle, prone	524	10
Voitto Kolho; Kalle Lappalainen; Nestor Toivonen; Vilho Vauhkonen; Magnus Wegelius	300 m team military rifle, standing	235	7
Yrjö Kolho; Kalle Lappalainen; Toivo Tikkanen; Nestor Toivonen; Magnus Wegelius	100 m team deer, single shots	159	2nd place, silver medalist(s)
Yrjö Kolho; Toivo Tikkanen; Nestor Toivonen; Vilho Vauhkonen; Magnus Wegelius	100 m team deer, double shots	285	3rd place, bronze medalist(s)

== Weightlifting ==
A single weightlifter represented Finland in 1920. It was the nation's debut in the sport. Ekström competed in the light heavyweight category, but did not finish the competition.

Weightlifter	Event	Final	
Weightlifter	Event	Result	Rank
Rudolf Ekström	82.5 kg	did not finish	

== Wrestling ==
Eighteen wrestlers competed for Finland in 1920. It was the nation's third appearance in the sport as well as the Olympics. The Finland team was the most successful of any country, taking fully half of the gold medals as well as twice as many total medals as any other country. Twelve of the eighteen wrestlers won medals.

Nine of the ten Greco-Roman wrestlers won medals, including three gold medals. The Finns swept the top two places in two of the five events, won two medals in two other events, and took one medal in the fifth. The Finnish wrestlers won 84% of their matches, a percentage that rises to 89% when matches between two men from Finland are excluded.

The eight freestyle wrestlers were also successful, taking two of a possible five gold medals, but not to the extent of the Greco-Roman wrestlers. Only three of the eight took medals, and the winning percentage was a less-staggering though still respectable 70%.

=== Freestyle ===
Wrestler	Event	Round of 32	Round of 16	Quarterfinals	Semifinals	Finals / Bronze match	Rank
Kalle Anttila	Lightweight	N/A	Deligny (FRA) (W)	Shimmon (USA) (W)	Thys (BEL) (W)	Svensson (SWE) (W)	1st place, gold medalist(s)
Johan Gallén	Light heavyweight	N/A	Roosen (BEL) (W)	Larsson (SWE) (L)	did not advance		5
Eino Leino	Middleweight	Bye	Bron (SUI) (W)	Janssens (BEL) (W)	Johnson (USA) (W)	Penttala (FIN) (W)	1st place, gold medalist(s)
Kaarlo Mäkinen	Featherweight	N/A	Gerson (USA) (L)	did not advance			9
Sven Mattsson	Heavyweight	N/A		Pendleton (USA) (L)	did not advance		5
Väinö Penttala	Middleweight	Backsman (FRA) (W)	Bacon (GBR) (W)	Derkinderen (BEL) (W)	Frantz (USA) (W)	Leino (FIN) (L)	2nd place, silver medalist(s)
Jussi Salila	Heavyweight	N/A		Roth (SUI) (L)	did not advance		5
Emil Westerlund	Light heavyweight	N/A	Rhys (GBR) (W)	Maurer (USA) (L)	did not advance		5

Opponent nation	Wins	Losses	Percent
Belgium	4	0	1.000
France	2	0	1.000
Great Britain	2	0	1.000
Sweden	1	1	.500
Switzerland	1	1	.500
United States	3	3	.500
Total international	13	5	.722
Finland	1	1	.500
Total	14	6	.700

Round	Wins	Losses	Percent
Round of 32	1	0	1.000
Round of 16	5	1	.857
Quarterfinals	3	4	.429
Semifinals	3	0	1.000
Final	2	1	.667
Bronze match	0	0	–
Total	14	6	.700

=== Greco-Roman ===
Wrestler	Event	Round of 32	Round of 16	Quarterfinals	Semifinals	Finals	Rank
Wrestler	Event	Round of 32	Round of 16	Silver quarters	Silver semis	Silver match	Rank
Wrestler	Event	Round of 32	Round of 16	Bronze quarters	Bronze semis	Bronze match	Rank
Oskari Friman	Featherweight	Bye	Gallery (USA) (W)	Svensson (SWE) (W)	Boumans (BEL) (W)	Kähkönen (FIN) (W)	1st place, gold medalist(s)
Oskari Friman	Featherweight	Bye	Gallery (USA) (W)	N/A	Won gold		1st place, gold medalist(s)
Oskari Friman	Featherweight	Bye	Gallery (USA) (W)	Won gold			1st place, gold medalist(s)
Heikki Kähkönen	Featherweight	Bye	Brian (USA) (W)	Torgensen (DEN) (W)	Pütsep (EST) (W)	Friman (FIN) (L)	2nd place, silver medalist(s)
Heikki Kähkönen	Featherweight	Bye	Brian (USA) (W)	N/A	Svensson (SWE) (W)	Boumans (BEL) (W)	2nd place, silver medalist(s)
Heikki Kähkönen	Featherweight	Bye	Brian (USA) (W)	Won silver			2nd place, silver medalist(s)
Adolf Lindfors	Heavyweight	Gasiglia (FRA) (W)	Willkie (USA) (W)	Dame (FRA) (W)	Hansen (DEN) (W)	Ahlgren (SWE) (W)	1st place, gold medalist(s)
Adolf Lindfors	Heavyweight	Gasiglia (FRA) (W)	Willkie (USA) (W)	Won gold			1st place, gold medalist(s)
Adolf Lindfors	Heavyweight	Gasiglia (FRA) (W)	Willkie (USA) (W)	Won gold			1st place, gold medalist(s)
Arthur Lindfors	Middleweight	Christensen (DEN) (W)	Johnsen (NOR) (W)	Balej (TCH) (W)	Szymanski (USA) (W)	Westergren (SWE) (L)	2nd place, silver medalist(s)
Arthur Lindfors	Middleweight	Christensen (DEN) (W)	Johnsen (NOR) (W)	Bye	Eillebrecht (NED) (W)	Perttilä (FIN) (W)	2nd place, silver medalist(s)
Arthur Lindfors	Middleweight	Christensen (DEN) (W)	Johnsen (NOR) (W)	Won silver			2nd place, silver medalist(s)
Martti Nieminen	Heavyweight	Bye	Larsen (DEN) (W)	Hansen (DEN) (L)	did not advance		3rd place, bronze medalist(s)
Martti Nieminen	Heavyweight	Bye	Larsen (DEN) (W)	did not advance			3rd place, bronze medalist(s)
Martti Nieminen	Heavyweight	Bye	Larsen (DEN) (W)	Bye	Willkie (USA) (W)	Weyand (USA) (W)	3rd place, bronze medalist(s)
Matti Perttilä	Middleweight	Cornelis (BEL) (W)	Nielsen (DEN) (W)	Fältström (SWE) (W)	Westergren (SWE) (L)	Did not advance	3rd place, bronze medalist(s)
Matti Perttilä	Middleweight	Cornelis (BEL) (W)	Nielsen (DEN) (W)	Bye	Vanderleenden (BEL) (W)	Lindfors (FIN) (L)	3rd place, bronze medalist(s)
Matti Perttilä	Middleweight	Cornelis (BEL) (W)	Nielsen (DEN) (W)	Bye	Eillebrecht (NED) (W)	Johnsen (NOR) (W)	3rd place, bronze medalist(s)
Anders Rajala	Light heavyweight	Bye	Tázler (TCH) (W)	Wahlem (BEL) (L)	did not advance		7
Anders Rajala	Light heavyweight	Bye	Tázler (TCH) (W)	N/A	did not advance		7
Anders Rajala	Light heavyweight	Bye	Tázler (TCH) (W)	N/A			7
Edil Rosenqvist	Light heavyweight	Bye	Johansson (SWE) (L)	did not advance			2nd place, silver medalist(s)
Edil Rosenqvist	Light heavyweight	Bye	Johansson (SWE) (L)	N/A	Tetens (DEN) (W)	Eriksen (DEN) (W)	2nd place, silver medalist(s)
Edil Rosenqvist	Light heavyweight	Bye	Johansson (SWE) (L)	N/A			2nd place, silver medalist(s)
Taavi Tamminen	Lightweight	Bye	Kopřiva (TCH) (W)	Frydenlund (NOR) (W)	Andersen (NOR) (W)	Väre (FIN) (W)	2nd place, silver medalist(s)
Taavi Tamminen	Lightweight	Bye	Kopřiva (TCH) (W)	Bye	Janssens (BEL) (W)	Frisenfeldt (DEN) (W)	2nd place, silver medalist(s)
Taavi Tamminen	Lightweight	Bye	Kopřiva (TCH) (W)	Won silver			2nd place, silver medalist(s)
Emil Väre	Lightweight	Christiansen (DEN) (W)	Rohon (FRA) (W)	Janssens (BEL) (W)	Frisenfeldt (DEN) (W)	Tamminen (FIN) (W)	1st place, gold medalist(s)
Emil Väre	Lightweight	Christiansen (DEN) (W)	Rohon (FRA) (W)	Won gold			1st place, gold medalist(s)
Emil Väre	Lightweight	Christiansen (DEN) (W)	Rohon (FRA) (W)	Won gold			1st place, gold medalist(s)

Opponent nation	Wins	Losses	Percent
Belgium	6	1	.857
Czechoslovakia	3	0	1.000
Denmark	10	1	.909
Estonia	1	0	1.000
France	3	0	1.000
Netherlands	2	0	1.000
Norway	4	0	1.000
Sweden	4	3	.571
United States	6	0	1.000
Total international	39	5	.886
Finland	3	3	.500
Total	42	8	.840

Round	Wins	Losses	Percent
Round of 32	4	0	1.000
Round of 16	9	1	.900
Quarterfinals	7	2	.778
Semifinals	6	1	.857
Final	3	3	.500
Silver quarterfinals	0	0	–
Silver semifinals	5	0	1.000
Silver match	4	1	.800
Bronze quarterfinals	0	0	–
Bronze semifinals	2	0	1.000
Bronze match	2	0	1.000
Total	42	8	.840
