= Estonia at the 1920 Summer Olympics =

- IOC code: EST
- NOC: Estonian Olympic Committee

in Antwerp
- Competitors: 14 (men) in 3 sports
- Flag bearer: Harald Tammer
- Medals Ranked 14th: Gold 1 Silver 2 Bronze 0 Total 3

Summer Olympics appearances (overview)
- 1920; 1924; 1928; 1932; 1936; 1948–1988; 1992; 1996; 2000; 2004; 2008; 2012; 2016; 2020; 2024

Other related appearances
- Russian Empire (1908–1912); Soviet Union (1952–1988)

Estonia competed as an independent country for the first time at the Summer Olympic Games at the 1920 Summer Olympics in Antwerp, Belgium. Estonia sent 14 athletes and 4 representatives to the games. Representatives were Ado Anderkopp, Leopold Tõnson, William Fiskar and Karl Metti.

== Medalists ==
Medal	Name	Sport	Event
Gold	Alfred Neuland	Weightlifting	Lightweight
Silver	Jüri Lossmann	Athletics	Men's marathon
Silver	Alfred Schmidt	Weightlifting	Featherweight

== Athletics ==
Men
Track & road events

Athlete	Event	Heat		Quarterfinal		Semifinal		Final	
Athlete	Event	Result	Rank	Result	Rank	Result	Rank	Result	Rank
Eduard Hermann	3000 m walk	—N/a				Disqualified		Did not advance	
Eduard Hermann	10 km walk	—N/a				Disqualified		Did not advance	
Jüri Lossmann	10,000 m	—N/a				Did not finish		Did not advance	
Jüri Lossmann	Marathon	—N/a						2:32.48,6	2nd place, silver medalist(s)
Reinhold Saulmann	100 m	Did not start		Did not advance					
Reinhold Saulmann	200 m	25.4	5	Did not advance					
Reinhold Saulmann	400 m	52.4	3	Did not advance					
Johannes Villemson	800 m	—N/a		2.00.2 NR	6	Did not advance			
Johannes Villemson	1500 m	—N/a				Disqualified		Did not advance	

Field events

Athlete	Event	Qualification		Final	
Athlete	Event	Distance	Position	Distance	Position
Aleksander Klumberg	Javelin throw	59.03	6 Q	62.39	5
Johann Martin	Pole vault	NM		Did not advance	
Harald Tammer	Shot put	13.605	6 Q	13.605	6

Combined events – Men's pentathlon

Athlete	Event	LJ	JT	200 m	DT	1500 m	Final	Rank
Aleksander Klumberg	Result	6.25	60.76m	25,3	38.62	DNS	29	8
Aleksander Klumberg	Points	10	1	15	3	0	29	8

Combined events – Men's decathlon

Athlete	Event	100 m	LJ	SP	HJ	400 m	100H	DT	PV	JT	1500 m	Final	Rank
Aleksander Klumberg	Result	12.4	6.21	11.61	1.70	56.2	18.0	35.91	3.10	NM	DNS	DNF	
Aleksander Klumberg	Points	571.6	659.450	627	678	699.20	715.0	646.60	541	0	—	DNF	

== Weightlifting ==
Athlete	Event	Clean & Jerk			Total	Rank
Athlete	Event	Result	Result	Result	Total	Rank
Alfred Schmidt	-60,0 kg	55.0	65.0	90.0	212,5	Silver
Karl Kõiv	-60,0 kg	45.0	60.0	85.0	190	7
Alfred Neuland	-67,5 kg	72.5	75.0	110.0	257,5	Gold

== Wrestling ==
=== Greco-Roman ===
Men's

Athlete	Event	First round	Second round	Quarterfinal	Semifinal	Third round	Fourth round	Fifth round	Final	Rank
Athlete	Event	Opposition Result	Opposition Result	Opposition Result	Opposition Result	Opposition Result	Opposition Result	Opposition Result	Opposition Result	Rank
Eduard Pütsep	Featherweight	Dierickx (BEL); W	Olsen (NOR); W	Beránek (TCH); W	Kähkönen (FIN); L	—N/a	Torgensen (DEN); L	Did not advance		6
Mihkel Müller	Middleweight	Notaris (GRE); L	Did not advance							17
Herman Kruusenberg	Light heavyweight	BYE	Tetens (DEN); L	Did not advance						16
Artur Kukk	Heavyweight	BYE	Dame (FRA); L	Did not advance						16
