= Wrestling at the 1920 Summer Olympics – Men's Greco-Roman featherweight =

Wrestling at the Olympics

Men's featherweight Greco-Roman wrestling at the Games of the VII Olympiad
- Venue: Olympisch Stadion
- Dates: August 16–20
- Competitors: 21 from 12 nations

Medalists
1st place, gold medalist(s)		Oskari Friman	Finland
2nd place, silver medalist(s)		Heikki Kähkönen	Finland
3rd place, bronze medalist(s)		Fritiof Svensson	Sweden

The men's Greco-Roman featherweight was a Greco-Roman wrestling event held as part of the Wrestling at the 1920 Summer Olympics programme. It was the second appearance of the event. Featherweight was the lightest category, including wrestlers weighing up to 60 kilograms.

A total of 21 wrestlers from 12 nations competed in the event, which was held from August 16 to August 20, 1920.

== Results ==
=== Gold medal round ===
First Round
Alexandre Boumans (BEL)
Willem Roels (NED)
Daniel V. Gallery (USA)
Johannes van Maaren (NED)
Eduard Pütsep (EST)
Henri Dierickx (BEL)
Adrian Brian (USA)
Ioannis Dialetis (GRE)
Rasmus Torgensen (DEN)
František Řezáč (TCH)

Second Round
Alexandre Boumans (BEL)
Piero Vaglio (ITA)
Enrico Porro (ITA)
Gottfrid Svensson (SWE)
Oskari Friman (FIN)
Daniel V. Gallery (USA)
Fritiof Svensson (SWE)
Svend Jensen (DEN)
Eduard Pütsep (EST)
Wilhelm Olsen (NOR)
Josef Beránek (TCH)
Jules Bouquet (FRA)
Heikki Kähkönen (FIN)
Adrian Brian (USA)
Rasmus Torgensen (DEN)
Némo Bovis (FRA)

Quarter-finals
Alexandre Boumans (BEL)
Enrico Porro (ITA)
Oskari Friman (FIN)
Fritiof Svensson (SWE)
Eduard Pütsep (EST)
Josef Beránek (TCH)
Heikki Kähkönen (FIN)
Rasmus Torgensen (DEN)

Semi-finals
Alexandre Boumans (BEL)
Oskari Friman (FIN)
Eduard Pütsep (EST)
Heikki Kähkönen (FIN)

Final
Oskari Friman (FIN) (gold)
Heikki Kähkönen (FIN)

=== Silver medal round ===
Semi-finals
Alexandre Boumans (BEL)
Daniel V. Gallery (USA)
Heikki Kähkönen (FIN)
Fritiof Svensson (SWE)

Final
Alexandre Boumans (BEL)
Heikki Kähkönen (FIN) (silver)

=== Bronze medal round ===
First Round
Rasmus Torgensen (DEN)
Adrian Brian (USA)

Semi-finals
Rasmus Torgensen (DEN)
Eduard Pütsep (EST)
Fritiof Svensson (SWE)
Alexandre Boumans (BEL)

Final
Rasmus Torgensen (DEN)
Fritiof Svensson (SWE) (bronze)

== Notes ==
- Belgium Olympic Committee (1957). Olympic Games Antwerp 1920: Official Report (in French).
- Wudarski, Pawel (1999). "Wyniki Igrzysk Olimpijskich" (in Polish).
