= Wrestling at the 1920 Summer Olympics – Men's Greco-Roman lightweight =

Wrestling at the Olympics

Men's lightweight Greco-Roman wrestling at the Games of the VII Olympiad
- Venue: Olympisch Stadion
- Dates: August 16–20
- Competitors: 22 from 12 nations

Medalists
1st place, gold medalist(s)		Emil Väre	Finland
2nd place, silver medalist(s)		Taavi Tamminen	Finland
3rd place, bronze medalist(s)		Frithjof Andersen	Norway

The men's Greco-Roman lightweight was a Greco-Roman wrestling event held as part of the Wrestling at the 1920 Summer Olympics programme. It was the third appearance of the event. Featherweight was the second lightest category, and included wrestlers weighing up to 67.5 kilograms.

A total of 22 wrestlers from 12 nations competed in the event, which was held from August 16 to August 20, 1920.

== Results ==
=== Gold medal round ===
Round of 32
Emil Väre (FIN)	W
Fritz Christiansen (DEN)	L
Maurice Rohon (FRA)	W
Ahmed Rahmy (EGY)	L
Oral Swigart (USA)	W
Walter Ranghieri (ITA)	L
Frants Frisenfeldt (DEN)	W
Vasilios Pavlidis (GRE)	L
Holger Lindberg (SWE)	W
Johannes Nolton (NED)	L
Carl Coerse (NED)	W
Théodore Bainconneau (FRA)	L

Round of 16
Emil Väre (FIN)	W
Maurice Rohon (FRA)	L
Frits Janssens (BEL)	W
Oral Swigart (USA)	L
Frants Frisenfeldt (DEN)	W
Albert Savonet (BEL)	L
George Metropoulos (USA)	W
Vasilios Vouyoukos (GRE)	L
Taavi Tamminen (FIN)	W
František Kopřiva (TCH)	L
Richard Frydenlund (NOR)	W
Gustaf Nilsson (SWE)	L
Frithjof Andersen (NOR)	W
Holger Lindberg (SWE)	L
Carl Coerse (NED)	W
Karel Halík (TCH)	L

Quarterfinals
Emil Väre (FIN)	W
Frits Janssens (BEL)	L
Frants Frisenfeldt (DEN)	W
George Metropoulos (USA)	L
Taavi Tamminen (FIN)	W
Richard Frydenlund (NOR)	L
Frithjof Andersen (NOR)	W
Carl Coerse (NED)	L

Semifinals
Emil Väre (FIN)	W
Frants Frisenfeldt (DEN)	L
Taavi Tamminen (FIN)	W
Frithjof Andersen (NOR)	L

Final
Emil Väre (FIN) (gold)	W
Taavi Tamminen (FIN)	L

=== Silver medal round ===
Quarterfinals
Frits Janssens (BEL)	W
Fritz Christiansen (DEN)	L

Semifinals
Frits Janssens (BEL)	L
Taavi Tamminen (FIN)	W
Frants Frisenfeldt (DEN)	W
Maurice Rohon (FRA)	L

Final
Taavi Tamminen (FIN) (silver)	W
Frants Frisenfeldt (DEN)	L

=== Bronze medal rounds ===
Quarterfinals
Frithjof Andersen (NOR)	W
Frants Frisenfeldt (DEN)	L

Semifinals
Frithjof Andersen (NOR)	W
František Kopřiva (TCH)	L
Frits Janssens (BEL)	W
Richard Frydenlund (NOR)	L

Final
Frithjof Andersen (NOR) (bronze)	W
Frits Janssens (BEL)	L
