= Wrestling at the 1920 Summer Olympics – Men's Greco-Roman heavyweight =

Wrestling at the Olympics

Men's heavyweight Greco-Roman wrestling at the Games of the VII Olympiad
- Venue: Olympisch Stadion
- Dates: August 17–20
- Competitors: 19 from 12 nations

Medalists
1st place, gold medalist(s)		Adolf Lindfors	Finland
2nd place, silver medalist(s)		Poul Hansen	Denmark
3rd place, bronze medalist(s)		Martti Nieminen	Finland

The men's Greco-Roman heavyweight was a Greco-Roman wrestling event held as part of the Wrestling at the 1920 Summer Olympics programme. It was the third appearance of the event. Heavyweight was the heaviest category, including wrestlers weighing over 82.5 kilograms.

A total of 19 wrestlers from 12 nations competed in the event, which was held from August 17 to August 20, 1920.

== Results ==
=== Gold medal round ===
Round of 32
Adolf Lindfors (FIN)	W
André Gasiglia (FRA)	L
Edward Willkie (USA)	W
Josef Struna (TCH)	L
Giorgio Calza (ITA)	W
Jan Kraus (TCH)	L

Round of 16
Adolf Lindfors (FIN)	W
Edward Willkie (USA)	L
Edmond Dame (FRA)	W
Artur Kukk (EST)	L
Poul Hansen (DEN)	W
Alexander Weyand (USA)	L
Martti Nieminen (FIN)	W
Emil Larsen (DEN)	L
Anders Ahlgren (SWE)	W
Barend Bonneveld (NED)	L
Harald Vassboten (NOR)	W
Giorgio Calza (ITA)	L
Jaap Sjouwerman (NED)	W
Dimitrios Vergos (GRE)	L
Ernst Nilsson (SWE)	W
Eduard van den Bril (BEL)	L

Quarterfinals
Adolf Lindfors (FIN)	W
Edmond Dame (FRA)	L
Poul Hansen (DEN)	W
Martti Nieminen (FIN)	L
Anders Ahlgren (SWE)	W
Harald Vassboten (NOR)	L
Jaap Sjouwerman (NED)	W
Ernst Nilsson (SWE)	L

Semifinals
Adolf Lindfors (FIN)	W
Poul Hansen (DEN)	L
Anders Ahlgren (SWE)	W
Jaap Sjouwerman (NED)	L

Final
Adolf Lindfors (FIN)	W
Anders Ahlgren (SWE)	L

=== Silver medal round ===
Quarterfinals
Poul Hansen (DEN)	W
Edmond Dame (FRA)	L

Semifinals
Poul Hansen (DEN)	W
André Gasiglia (FRA)	L
Edward Willkie (USA)	W
Anders Ahlgren (SWE)	L

Final
Poul Hansen (DEN)	W
Edward Willkie (USA)	L

=== Bronze medal round ===
Quarterfinals
Edward Willkie (USA)	W
André Gasiglia (FRA)	L

Semifinals
Edward Willkie (USA)	L
Martti Nieminen (FIN)	W
Alexander Weyand (USA)	W
Edmond Dame (FRA)	L

Final
Martti Nieminen (FIN)	W
Alexander Weyand (USA)	L
