= Wrestling at the 1920 Summer Olympics – Men's freestyle middleweight =

Wrestling at the Olympics

Men's middleweight freestyle wrestling at the Games of the VII Olympiad
- Venue: Olympisch Stadion
- Dates: August 25–27
- Competitors: 18 from 12 nations

Medalists
1st place, gold medalist(s)		Eino Leino	Finland
2nd place, silver medalist(s)		Väinö Penttala	Finland
3rd place, bronze medalist(s)		Charley Johnson	United States

The men's freestyle middleweight was a Catch as Catch Can wrestling, later freestyle, event held as part of the wrestling competition at the 1920 Summer Olympics. It was the second appearance of the event. Middleweight was the median category, and included wrestlers weighing up to 69 kilograms.

A total of 18 wrestlers from twelve nations competed in the event, which was held from August 25 to 27, 1920.

== Results ==
Round of 32; August 25
Väinö Penttala (FIN)	W
Charles Backsman (FRA)	L
Charley Johnson (USA)	W
Enok Lopponen (CAN)	L

Round of 16; August 26
Väinö Penttala (FIN)	W
Edgar Bacon (GBR)	L
Pierre Derkinderen (BEL)	W
Ahmed Rahmy (EGY)	L
Angus Frantz (USA)	W
Stanley Bacon (GBR)	L
Otto Borgström (SWE)	W
Dimitrios Vergos (GRE)	L
Eino Leino (FIN)	W
Léonard Bron (SUI)	L
Frits Janssens (BEL)	W
Pierre Angelot (FRA)	L
Charley Johnson (USA)	W
Kumar Navale (IND)	L
Gudmund Grimstad (NOR)	W
Gottfrid Lindgren (SWE)	L

Quarterfinals; August 27
Väinö Penttala (FIN)	W
Pierre Derkinderen (BEL)	L
Angus Frantz (USA)	W
Otto Borgström (SWE)	L
Eino Leino (FIN)	W
Frits Janssens (BEL)	L
Charley Johnson (USA)	W
Gudmund Grimstad (NOR)	L

Semifinals; August 27
Väinö Penttala (FIN)	W
Angus Frantz (USA)	L
Eino Leino (FIN)	W
Charley Johnson (USA)	L

Final; August 27
Väinö Penttala (FIN)	L
Eino Leino (FIN)	W
Third place
Charley Johnson (USA)	W
Angus Frantz (USA)	L
