= Carl Coerse =

Dutch wrestler

- Full name: Carl Gustav Coerse
- Born: 15 November 1892; Amsterdam, Netherlands
- Died: 13 December 1953 (aged 61); Amsterdam, Netherlands
- State championships: Netherlands: (gold) 1919; (gold) 1920; (gold) 1924; (gold) 1925; North Holland: (gold) 1918; Friesland: (gold) 1920
- Olympic team: 1920, 1924

Carl Gustav Coerse (15 November 1892 – 13 December 1953) was a Dutch wrestler. Having a two decades sports career during the 1910s and 1920s he had international victories, became four times national champion and also became champion of North Holland and Friesland. He represented the Netherlands at the inaugural 1921 World Wrestling Championships and at the 1920 and 1924 Summer Olympics.

== Biography ==
=== Sports career ===
Coerse was a member of in his hometown Amsterdam of sports club "Hercules". He won one of his earliest prizes at national level in February 1911; winning the second prize at a national competition in Amsterdam. He later won other prizes at national competitions, and won the silver medal at the 1914 championships of North Holland in the lightweight class behind Willem Leloux. He won his first victory at a sold-out event at Ursus, Amsterdam in May 1915, and became the 1918 champion of North Holland.

In December 1919, being the favorite for the national title, he became the 1919 national champion. He won also the prize for the best wrestling style. In 1920 he became champion of Friesland. As a result, he was selected to represent the Netherlands at the 1920 Summer Olympics in Antwerp. At the Olympics he defeated the French Théodore Bainconneau already in 3.5 minutes. Later he also won from the Czech Karel Halík with a forward belt in less than 4.5 minutes. Coerse was eliminated in the quarter final after over 13 minutes, losing from bronze medalist Norwegian Frithjof Andersen.

At the end of 1920 he defended successfully his national title, becoming for the second time national lightweight champion.

In 1921 he represented the Netherlands at the 1921 World Wrestling Championships, the first official World Championships held in Helsinki, Finland. He won in 1 minutes 35 seconds of Estonian Kasik, but was later on a later day eliminated by Olympic champion Oskari Friman who would later become the first World Champion.

In 1922, still named the most beautiful wrestler in the Netherlands, he had his first international victory, winning the international wrestling competition at Diamantbeurs, Amsterdam, winning easily against German A. van Duren and also his fellow countryman Hartman. Due to illness he was unable to participate at the 1923 national wrestling championships. However, Coerse won the competition in December 1923 and also won the prize for the best wrestling style.

In June 1924 he became national champion. As it also was the qualification event; he qualified to participate at the 1924 Summer Olympics in Paris. At the Olympics he beat Spanish Francisco Solé with a touché. In the second round he lost by a small margin after fifteen minutes from Danish Frants Frisenfeldt. At the Olympics there was a lot of criticism about the organization of the wrestling tournament, in media described "rarely has one seen a tournament that was so poorly prepared". Due to the many inconveniences Coerse didn't appear at the match of round 3 against František Kratochvíl, and so eliminated himself. In August 1924 he won an international competition in Essen, Germany and was praised for his performance.

In May 1925 he became for the fourth time Dutch national champion ahead of J. J. Van Bentum. Already since the 1919 national championships he competes against Van Bentum and grew over the years to some kind of rivality. Competing at numerous national competitions the following year, winning several prizes, he had did his last matches in 1928. Not qualified for the Summer Olympics he participated in March and May at the preparation matches for the Dutch Olympic wrestling team ahead of the 1928 Summer Olympics.

=== Sports official and trainer ===
Already during an early time in his career, 1918, he was also a sports official during competitions. The years after the 1924 Summer Olympics he became more involved in being a sports official. He fulfilled the exam for wrestling official without making a mistake.

During the 1920s he contributed to wrestling demonstrations. In October 1926 he also started giving public wrestling lessons in Arnhem. Due to the success of such lessons, extra lessons were planned.

=== Personal life ===
Coerse was born in Amsterdam on 15 November 1892 as the son of ship's riveter Johannes Herman Coerse and Anna Pieternella Felderhoff. Coerse worked as a concrete worker. On 7 December 1922 he married Maria Louisa Kampman, who was seven years younger, in Amsterdam. He died in Amsterdam on 13 December 1953 at the age of 61.
