= Wrestling at the 1920 Summer Olympics =

Wrestling at the Games of the VII Olympiad
- Venue: Grande Salle de la Zoologie
- Dates: 16–27 August 1920
- No. of events: 10 (10 men, 0 women)
- Competitors: 152 from 19 nations

At the 1920 Summer Olympics, ten wrestling events were contested, for all men. There were five weight classes in Greco-Roman wrestling and five classes in Catch as Catch Can, predecessor to freestyle wrestling. The competitions were held from Monday, August 16 to Friday, August 20, 1920 (Greco-Roman) and from Wednesday, August 25 to Friday, August 27, 1920 (freestyle).

== Medal summary ==
=== Greco-Roman ===
Games	Gold	Silver	Bronze
Featherweight	Oskari Friman; Finland	Heikki Kähkönen; Finland	Fritiof Svensson; Sweden
Lightweight	Emil Väre; Finland	Taavi Tamminen; Finland	Frithjof Andersen; Norway
Middleweight	Carl Westergren; Sweden	Arthur Lindfors; Finland	Masa Perttilä; Finland
Light heavyweight	Claes Johanson; Sweden	Edil Rosenqvist; Finland	Johannes Eriksen; Denmark
Heavyweight	Adolf Lindfors; Finland	Poul Hansen; Denmark	Martti Nieminen; Finland

=== Freestyle ===
Games	Gold	Silver	Bronze
Featherweight	Charles Ackerly; United States	Sam Gerson; United States	Bernard Bernard; Great Britain
Lightweight	Kalle Anttila; Finland	Gottfrid Svensson; Sweden	Herbert Wright; Great Britain
Middleweight	Eino Leino; Finland	Väinö Penttala; Finland	Charley Johnson; United States
Light heavyweight	Anders Larsson; Sweden	Charles Courant; Switzerland	Walter Maurer; United States
Heavyweight	Robert Roth; Switzerland	Nat Pendleton; United States	Fred Meyer; United States
Heavyweight	Robert Roth; Switzerland	Nat Pendleton; United States	Ernst Nilsson; Sweden

== Participating nations ==
A total of 152 wrestlers from 19 nations competed at the Antwerp Games:

- Belgium (12)
- Canada (1)
- Czechoslovakia (10)
- Denmark (10)
- Egypt (1)
- Estonia (4)
- Finland (18)
- France (17)
- Great Britain (10)
- Greece (5)
- India (2)
- Italy (8)
- Luxembourg (2)
- Netherlands (9)
- Norway (7)
- South Africa (1)
- Sweden (13)
- Switzerland (4)
- United States (18)

== Medal table ==
Rank	Nation	Gold	Silver	Bronze	Total
1	Finland	5	5	2	12
2	Sweden	3	1	2	6
3	United States	1	2	3	6
4	Switzerland	1	1	0	2
5	Denmark	0	1	1	2
6	Great Britain	0	0	2	2
7	Norway	0	0	1	1
Totals (7 entries)		10	10	11	31

== See also ==
- List of World and Olympic Champions in men's freestyle wrestling
- List of World and Olympic Champions in Greco-Roman wrestling
