= Wrestling at the 1920 Summer Olympics – Men's freestyle light heavyweight =

Wrestling at the Olympics

Men's light heavyweight freestyle wrestling at the Games of the VII Olympiad
- Venue: Olympisch Stadion
- Dates: August 25–27, 1920
- Competitors: 13 from 8 nations

Medalists
1st place, gold medalist(s)		Anders Larsson	Sweden
2nd place, silver medalist(s)		Charles Courant	Switzerland
3rd place, bronze medalist(s)		Walter Maurer	United States

The men's freestyle light heavyweight was a Catch as Catch Can wrestling, later freestyle, held as part of the Wrestling at the 1920 Summer Olympics programme. It was the first appearance of the weight class. Light heavyweight was the second-heaviest category, and included wrestlers weighing up to 80 kilograms.

A total of 13 wrestlers from eight nations competed in the event, which was held from Wednesday, August 25 to Friday, August 27, 1920.

== Results ==
Round of 16; August 25
Anders Larsson (SWE)	W
François Meyer (FRA)	L
Johan Gallén (FIN)	W
Hyacinthe Roosen (BEL)	L
Walter Maurer (USA)	W
Pierre Ledron (FRA)	L
Emil Westerlund (FIN)	W
Noel Rhys (GBR)	L
Charles Courant (SUI)	-
Bye	-
Jan van Rensburg (RSA)	W
Henri Snoeck (BEL)	L
John Redman (USA)	-
Bye	-
William Wilson (GBR)	-
Bye	-

Quarterfinals; August 25
Anders Larsson (SWE)	W
Johan Gallén (FIN)	L
Walter Maurer (USA)
Emil Westerlund (FIN)
Charles Courant (SUI)	W
Jan van Rensburg (RSA)	L
John Redman (USA)	W
William Wilson (GBR)	L

Semifinals; August 27
Anders Larsson (SWE)	W
Walter Maurer (USA)	L
Charles Courant (SUI)	W
John Redman (USA)	L

Final; August 27
Anders Larsson (SWE)	W
Charles Courant (SUI)	L
Third place
Walter Maurer (USA)	W
John Redman (USA)	L
