= Wrestling at the 1920 Summer Olympics – Men's Greco-Roman middleweight =

Wrestling at the Olympics

Men's middleweight Greco-Roman wrestling at the Games of the VII Olympiad
- Venue: Olympisch Stadion
- Dates: August 16–20
- Competitors: 23 from 12 nations

Medalists
1st place, gold medalist(s)		Carl Westergren	Sweden
2nd place, silver medalist(s)		Arthur Lindfors	Finland
3rd place, bronze medalist(s)		Masa Perttilä	Finland

The men's Greco-Roman middleweight was a Greco-Roman wrestling event held as part of the Wrestling at the 1920 Summer Olympics programme. It was the third appearance of the event. Middleweight was the median category, including wrestlers weighing up to 75 kilograms.

A total of 23 wrestlers from 12 nations competed in the event, which was held from August 16 to August 20, 1920.

== Results ==
=== Gold medal round ===
Round of 32
Calle Westergren (SWE)	W
Johannes Eillebrecht (NED)	L
Matti Perttilä (FIN)	W
Oscar Cornelis (BEL)	L
Svend Nielsen (DEN)	W
Willem Leloux (NED)	L
Arthur Lindfors (FIN)	W
Emil Christensen (DEN)	L
Carlo Corsanego (ITA)	W
Émile Gorbière (FRA)	L
Josef Huml (TCH)	W
Camille Prunier (FRA)	L
Sotirios Notaris (GRE)	W
Mihkel Müller (EST)	L

Round of 16
Calle Westergren (SWE)	W
Michel Dechmann (LUX)	L
M. Vanderleenden (BEL)	W
Paul Zanolini (USA)	L
Matti Perttilä (FIN)	W
Svend Nielsen (DEN)	L
Carl Fältström (SWE)	W
Giuseppe Gorletti (ITA)	L
Arthur Lindfors (FIN)	W
Sjur Johnsen (NOR)	L
Jan Balej (TCH)	W
Carlo Corsanego (ITA)	L
Henry Szymanski (USA)	W
Josef Huml (TCH)	L
Einar Stensrud (NOR)	W
Sotirios Notaris (GRE)	L

Quarterfinals
Calle Westergren (SWE)	W
Maurice Vanderleenden (BEL)	L
Matti Perttilä (FIN)	W
Carl Fältström (SWE)	L
Arthur Lindfors (FIN)	W
Jan Balej (TCH)	L
Henry Szymanski (USA)	W
Einar Stensrud (NOR)	L

Semifinals
Calle Westergren (SWE)	W
Matti Perttilä (FIN)	L
Arthur Lindfors (FIN)	W
Henry Szymanski (USA)	L

Final
Calle Westergren (SWE) (gold)	W
Arthur Lindfors (FIN)	L

=== Silver medal round ===
Quarterfinals
Maurice Vanderleenden (BEL)	W
Michel Dechmann (LUX)	L

Semifinals
Maurice Vanderleenden (BEL)	L
Matti Perttilä (FIN)	W
Arthur Lindfors (FIN)	W
Johannes Eillebrecht (NED)	L

Final
Matti Perttilä (FIN)	L
Arthur Lindfors (FIN) (silver)	W

=== Bronze medal rounds ===
Quarterfinals
Sjur Johnsen (NOR)	W
Henry Szymanski (USA)	L
Johannes Eillebrecht (NED)	W
Jan Balej (TCH)	L

Semifinals
Sjur Johnsen (NOR)	W
Emil Christensen (DEN)	L
Johannes Eillebrecht (NED)	L
Matti Perttilä (FIN)	W

Final
Sjur Johnsen (NOR)	L
Matti Perttilä (FIN) (bronze)	W
