= Mitropoulos =

Mitropoulos (Greek: Μητρόπουλος) is a Greek surname. The female version of the name is Mitropoulou (Greek: Μητροπούλου). Notable people with the name "Mitropoulos" include:

== Men ==
- Dimitri Mitropoulos (1896–1960), Greek conductor, pianist, and composer
- Efthimios Mitropoulos (born 1939), Greek secretary-general of the International Maritime Organization
- Ioannis Mitropoulos (1874–after 1896), Greek gymnast
- Pavlos Mitropoulos (born 1990), Greek football midfielder
- Tasos Mitropoulos (born 1957), Greek politician and football midfielder
- Victor Mitropoulos (born 1946), Greek football defender and EPAE president
- Nicholas Metropolis also Nikolaos Mitropoulos (1915–1999), Greek American physicist
- Dean Metropoulos (born 1946), Greek-American billionaire investor and businessman. He was the owner of Pabst Brewing Company
- George Metropoulos (born 1897 - DOD unknown), was an American wrestler. He competed in the Greco-Roman lightweight and the freestyle lightweight events at the 1920 Summer Olympics

== Women ==
- Kostoula Mitropoulou, Greek poet
- Nikolia Mitropoulou, Greek high jumper
