= Pütsep =

Family name

Pütsep is an Estonian occupational surname, literally meaning "cooper". The surname may refer to:

- Eduard Pütsep (1898–1960), wrestler
- Erki Pütsep (born 1976), road bicycle racer
