= Jan Kraus =

Jan Kraus may refer to:

- Jan Kraus (actor) (born 1953), Czech actor and TV host
- Jan Kraus (footballer) (born 1979), Czech footballer
- Jan Kraus (wrestler), Czech wrestler
- Jan Kraus (cyclist) (born 1993), Czech track cyclist
