= Wrestling at the 1924 Summer Olympics – Men's freestyle light heavyweight =

Men's light heavyweight freestyle wrestling at the Games of the VIII Olympiad
- Venue: Vélodrome d'Hiver
- Dates: July 11–14, 1924
- Competitors: 15 from 10 nations

Medalists
1st place, gold medalist(s)		John Spellman	United States
2nd place, silver medalist(s)		Rudolf Svensson	Sweden
3rd place, bronze medalist(s)		Charles Courant	Switzerland

The men's freestyle light heavyweight was a freestyle wrestling event held as part of the Wrestling at the 1924 Summer Olympics programme. It was the second appearance of the event. Light heavyweight was the second-heaviest category, including wrestlers weighing from 79 to 87 kilograms.

== Results ==
Source: Official results; Wudarski

=== Gold medal round ===
Round of 16
John Spellman (USA)	W
William Wilson (GBR)	L
George Rumpel (CAN)	W
J. Baillot (FRA)	L
Fabio Del Genovese (ITA)	W
Gustave Kappeler (FRA)	L
Johan Svensson (SWE)	W
Jean Hutmacher (BEL)	L
Iisak Mylläri (FIN)	W
Victor Lay (GBR)	L
Poul Hansen (DEN)	W
Fritz Roth (SUI)	L
Charles Courant (SUI)	W
Charles Strack (USA)	L

Quarterfinals
John Spellman (USA)	W
George Rumpel (CAN)	L
Calle Westergren (SWE)	W
Fabio del Genovese (ITA)	L
Johan Svensson (SWE)	W
Iisak Mylläri (FIN)	L
Poul Hansen (DEN)	L
Charles Courant (SUI)	W

Semifinals
John Spellman (USA)	W
Calle Westergren (SWE)	L
Johan Svensson (SWE)	W
Charles Courant (SUI)	L

Final
John Spellman (USA)	W
Johan Svensson (SWE)	L

=== Silver medal round ===
Semifinals		Final
Johan Svensson (SWE)	W
Calle Westergren (SWE)	L	Johan Svensson (SWE)	W
William Wilson (GBR)	W	William Wilson (GBR)	L
George Rumple (CAN)	L

=== Bronze medal round ===
As Wilson, Westergren, Hutmacher, and Mylläri declined to compete, Charles Courant was awarded the bronze medal.
