= Mylläri =

Mylläri, meaning "miller" in Finnish, may refer to:

- Mylläri (surname)
- Mylläri, a 2011 EP of Finnish band Circle
- Mylläri (Orivesi), island in Finland in Lake Orivesi in the municipality of Nyslott
- Mylläri (Pyhäselkä), island in Finland in Lake Pyhäselkä in the municipality of Libelits
