= Swigart =

Swigart is a surname. Notable people with the surname include:

- Oad Swigart (1915–1997), American baseball player
- Oral Swigart (1897–1973), American naval officer and wrestler
- Rob Swigart (born 1941), American novelist, poet, short story writer, futurist, and archaeology scholar
