= Struna =

Struna means string in several Slavic languages. It is also a Slavic surname that may refer to the following people:

- Aljaž Struna (born 1990), Slovenian football defender
- Andraž Struna (born 1989), Slovenian football defender, brother of Aljaž
- Josef Struna, Czech wrestler

== See also ==
- Struna River in Romania
