= Mitsopoulos =

Mitsopoulos (Greek: Μητσόπουλος) is a Greek surname. Notable people with the surname include:

- Konstantinos M. Mitsopoulos (1844–1911), Greek scientist and professor
- Nadia Mitsopoulos (born 1971), Australian journalist
- Tasos Mitsopoulos (1965–2014), Cypriot politician

== See also ==
- Mitropoulos
