= Wrestling at the 1920 Summer Olympics – Men's freestyle lightweight =

Wrestling at the Olympics

Men's lightweight freestyle wrestling at the Games of the VII Olympiad
- Venue: Olympisch Stadion
- Dates: August 25–27
- Competitors: 9 from 6 nations

Medalists
1st place, gold medalist(s)		Kalle Anttila	Finland
2nd place, silver medalist(s)		Gottfrid Svensson	Sweden
3rd place, bronze medalist(s)		Herbert Wright	Great Britain

The men's freestyle lightweight was a Catch as Catch Can wrestling, later freestyle, event held as part of the wrestling at the 1920 Summer Olympics programme. It was the third appearance of the event. Lightweight was the second-lightest category, and included wrestlers weighing up to 61 kilograms.

Nine wrestlers from six nations competed in the event, which was held from Wednesday, August 25 to Friday, August 27, 1920.

== Results ==
Round of 16; August 25
Kalle Anttila (FIN)	W
Jules Deligny (FRA)	L
Joseph Shimmon (USA)	-
Bye	-
August Thys (BEL)	-
Bye	-
-	-
-	-
Gottfrid Svensson (SWE)	W
George Metropoulos (USA)	L
George MacKenzie (GBR)	-
Bye	-
Herbert Wright (GBR)	-
Bye	-
Henri Joudiou (FRA)	-
Bye	-

Quarterfinals; August 26
Kalle Anttila (FIN)	W
Joseph Shimmon (USA)	L
August Thys (BEL)	-
Bye	-
Gottfrid Svensson (SWE)	W
George MacKenzie (GBR)	L
Herbert Wright (GBR)	W
Henri Joudiou (FRA)	L

Semifinals; August 27
Kalle Anttila (FIN)	W
August Thys (BEL)	L
Gottfrid Svensson (SWE)	W
Herbert Wright (GBR)	L

Final; August 27
Kalle Anttila (FIN)	W
Gottfrid Svensson (SWE)	L
Third place
Herbert Wright (GBR)	W
August Thys (BEL)	L
