= Gustaf Nilsson =

Gustaf Nilsson may refer to:

- Gustaf Nilsson (footballer, born 1922) (1922–2004), Swedish footballer
- Gustaf Nilsson (footballer, born 1997), Swedish footballer
- Gustaf Nilsson (wrestler) (1899–1980), Swedish wrestler
