= John Paine (weightlifter) =

British weightlifter

Personal information
- Full name: John Garnet Paine
- Nationality: British
- Born: 2 May 1883
- Died: 1953 (aged 69–70) Leytonstone, London

Sport
- Sport: Weightlifting

John Paine (2 May 1883 – 1953) was a British weightlifter. He competed in the men's featherweight event at the 1920 Summer Olympics.
