= Enok Lopponen =

Finnish wrestler

- Born: 3 January 1885; Mikkeli, Finland
- Died: 7 December 1963 (aged 78); Toronto, Canada

Enok Evert Lopponen (3 January 1885 – 7 December 1963) was a Finnish wrestler. He competed in the freestyle middleweight event at the 1920 Summer Olympics representing Canada.
