= Weightlifting at the 1920 Summer Olympics – Men's 60 kg =

Men's featherweight weightlifting at the Games of the VII Olympiad
- Venue: Olympisch Stadion
- Date: 29 August
- Competitors: 14 from 11 nations

Medalists
1st place, gold medalist(s)		Frans De Haes	Belgium
2nd place, silver medalist(s)		Alfred Schmidt	Estonia
3rd place, bronze medalist(s)		Eugène Ryter	Switzerland

The men's featherweight was a weightlifting event held as part of the Weightlifting at the 1920 Summer Olympics programme in Antwerp. 1920 was the first time weightlifting was divided into weight categories. Featherweight was the lightest category, including weightlifters weighing up to 60 kilograms. A total of 14 weightlifters from 11 nations competed in the event, which was held on 29 August 1920.

== Results ==
Place	Weightlifter	1	2	3	Total
Gold	François de Haes (BEL)	60.0	65.0	95.0	220.0
Silver	Alfred Schmidt (EST)	55.0	65.0	90.0	210.0
Bronze	Eugène Ryter (SUI)	55.0	65.0	90.0	210.0
4	Luigi Gatti (ITA)	50.0	55.0	90.0	195.0
5	Ludvík Wágner (TCH)	50.0	65.0	80.0	195.0
6	Gustav Eriksson (SWE)	47.5	65.0	80.0	192.5
7	Louis De Haes (BEL)	45.0	60.0	85.0	190.0
7	Karl Kõiv (EST)	45.0	60.0	85.0	190.0
9	Joop Tijman (NED)	50.0	50.0	85.0	185.0
10	Niels Florin (DEN)	45.0	55.0	80.0	180.0
11	John Paine (GBR)	42.5	50.0	80.0	172.5
12	André Delloue (FRA)	0.0	55.0	95.0	150.0
13	Jean Ducher (FRA)	0.0	60.0	80.0	140.0
—	Michel Mertens (LUX)	45.0	—	—	DNF
