= Victor Lay =

British wrestler

- Born: 26 August 1897; Hartismere, Suffolk, Suffolk, England
- Died: 1 March 1979 (aged 81); Barnet, London, England

Victor Lay (26 August 1897 – 1 March 1979) was a British wrestler. He competed in the freestyle light heavyweight event at the 1924 Summer Olympics.
