= Émile Gorbière =

French wrestler

- Born: 20 October 1893; Flers, Orne, France
- Died: 15 February 1956 (aged 62); Courbevoie, France

Émile Gorbière (20 October 1893 – 15 February 1956) was a French wrestler. He competed in the Greco-Roman middleweight event at the 1920 Summer Olympics.
