= Paul Zanolini =

American wrestler

- Born: August 13, 1898; Starkville, Colorado, U.S.
- Died: June 8, 1989 (aged 90); Los Angeles, California, U.S.

Paul Zanolini (August 13, 1898 – June 8, 1989) was an American wrestler. He competed in the Greco-Roman middleweight event at the 1920 Summer Olympics.
