= Gustav Eriksson (weightlifter) =

Swedish weightlifter (1897–1974)

Personal information
- Nationality: Swedish
- Born: 13 March 1897 Örebro, Sweden
- Died: 18 April 1974 (aged 77) Örebro, Sweden

Sport
- Sport: Weightlifting

Gustav Adolf Eriksson (13 March 1897 – 18 April 1974) was a Swedish weightlifter. He competed in the men's featherweight event at the 1920 Summer Olympics.
