= Oral Swigart =

American wrestler and United States Navy admiral

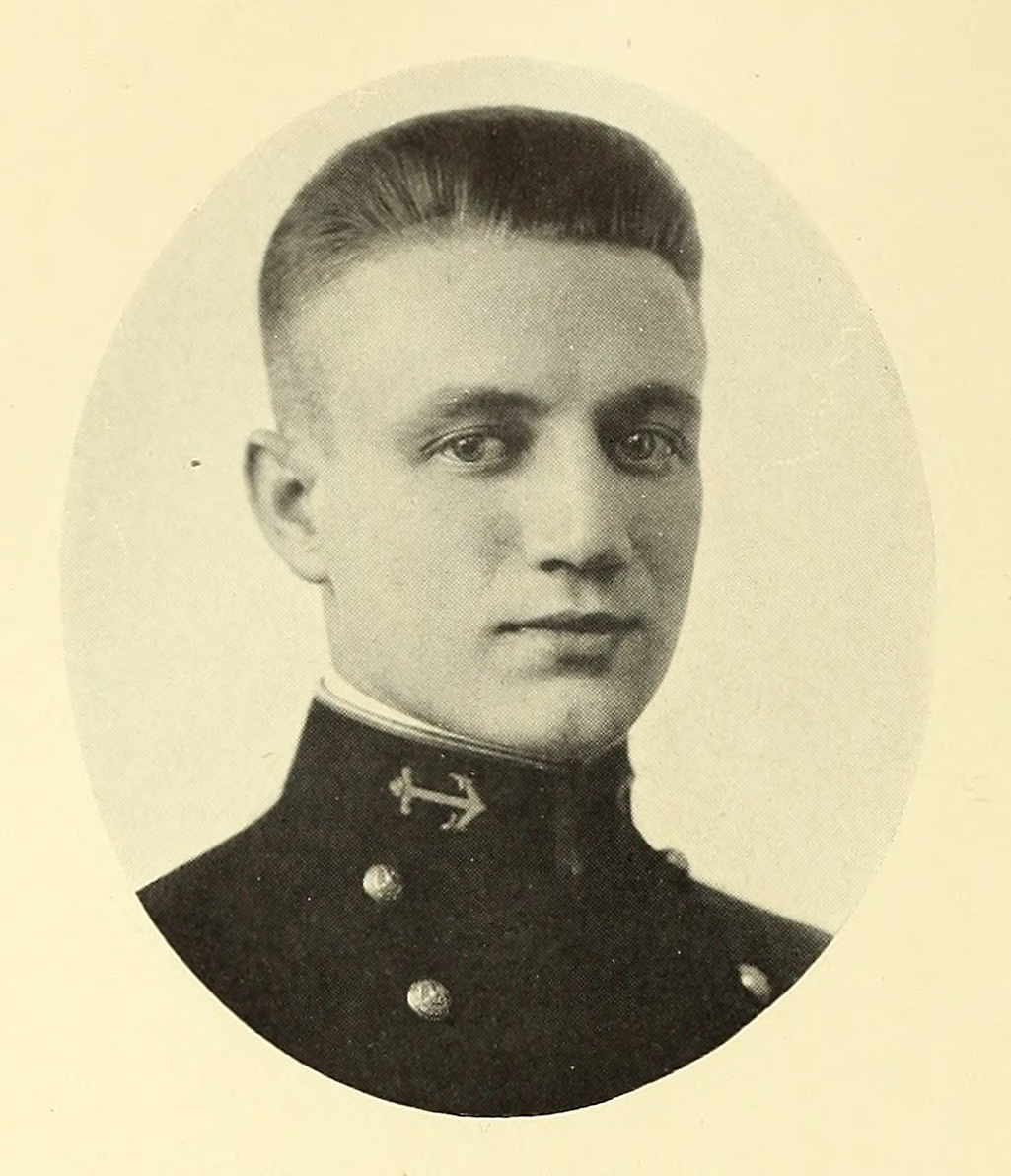
- Swigart at the United States Naval Academy, 1921
- Born: October 7, 1897; Columbia City, Indiana, U.S.
- Died: June 21, 1973 (aged 75); Paris, France
- Spouse: Margaret Williams
- Children: 2
- Military career
- Allegiance: United States
- Branch: United States Navy
- Service years: 1921–1951
- Rank: Rear Admiral
- Commands: USS Melville; LST Flotilla 8
- Conflicts: World War II
- Awards: Legion of Merit with a star and combat "V" device; Bronze Star

Rear Admiral Oral Raymond Swigart (October 7, 1897 – June 21, 1973) was an American naval officer. While at the United States Naval Academy he competed in the Greco-Roman lightweight event at the 1920 Summer Olympics. During World War II Swigart served as commander of the USS Melville, escorting some of the first troops to Britain in early 1942. He later served in command of a flotilla of Landing Ship, Tanks in the Pacific Theatre. Swigart received two Legions of Merit and the Bronze Star for his service.

== Early life ==
Oral Raymond Swigart was born in Columbia City, Indiana, on October 9, 1897. He attended Columbia City High School before entering the United States Naval Academy in Annapolis, Maryland. Swigart captained the naval academy's wrestling team and was later entered into the Naval Academy Athletic Association Hall of Fame. He was part of the American team sent to the 1920 Summer Olympics where he competed in the Greco-Roman lightweight event. Swigart was granted permission to remain at the academy longer than normal to train for the event. He beat the Italian Walter Ranghieri in the first round but was knocked out by Frits Janssens in round two. Janssens was of heavier weight and more familiar with the Greco-Roman style; Swigart was used to freestyle wrestling.

== Naval career ==
After graduating from the academy in 1921 Swigart was commissioned into the US Navy. In 1926, while serving as a lieutenant junior grade on the destroyer USS Hatfield he joined a suit against the navy for reimbursement of stoppages from his pay that had occurred before an All Navy Message of 1925 had ended the practice of taking back allowances overpaid by the navy where the recipient had acted in good faith. Swigart served with US forces during the occupation of Nicaragua and received the Second Nicaraguan Campaign Medal, which was awarded for service between 1926 and 1933.

Soon after the United States declaration of war on Germany, Swigart was commander of the destroyer tender USS Melville which accompanied the first American troops to the United Kingdom in January 1942. Swigart was recognized for his efforts when commanding troop transports during the July 1943 Allied invasion of Sicily. Transferring to the Pacific Theatre he commanded Landing Ship, Tank Flotilla 8. Swigart landed troops and supplies at Tonga and New Zealand and helped transport the First Marine Division to the Solomon Islands. He later participated in the Guadalcanal campaign, landing supplies for the troops. During the 1944–1945 liberation of the Philippines he landed troops on the beaches of Leyte and at Manila and took part in the Invasion of Lingayen Gulf and the Battle of Mindanao. Swigart received the Legion of Merit with a star for a second award and combat "V" device as well as a Bronze Star Medal for his service during the war. He was also awarded the European–African–Middle Eastern Campaign Medal with one campaign star, the Asiatic–Pacific Campaign Medal with five campaign stars and the Philippine Liberation Medal with two campaign stars. Swigart retired in 1951 as a rear admiral.

== Personal life ==
Swigart was married to Margaret Williams. They had two sons who both served as officers in the United States Marine Corps: Oral Swigart Jr. who reached the rank of colonel and Captain Robert Williams Swigart who was killed in action in the Vietnam War in July 1967. Oral Swigart Sr. died in Paris, France, on June 21, 1973, of a suspected heart attack.
