= Camille Prunier =

French wrestler

Camille Prunier (16 February 1891 – 5 November 1973) was a French wrestler. He competed in the Greco-Roman middleweight event at the 1920 Summer Olympics.
