= Frans De Haes =

Belgian weightlifter

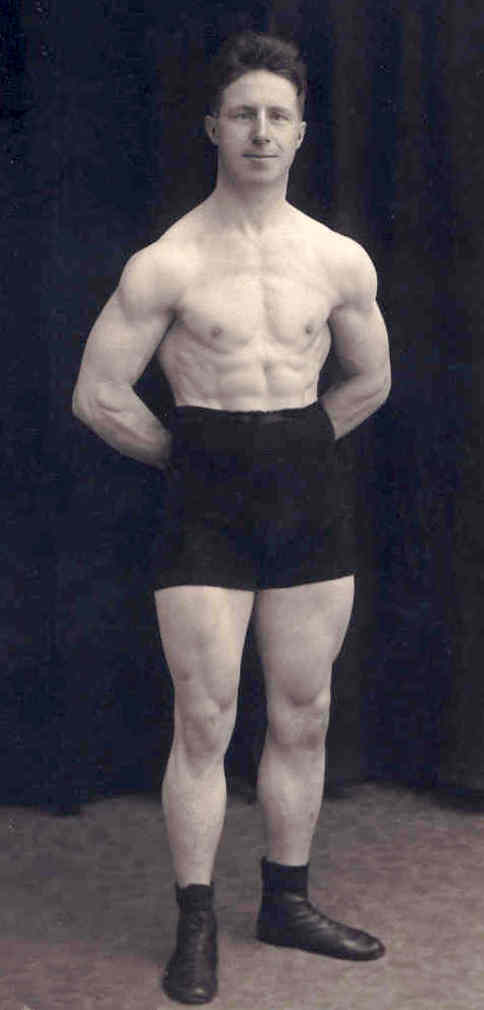

Personal information
- Born: 28 July 1899 Antwerp, Belgium
- Died: 4 November 1923 (aged 24) Antwerp, Belgium
Medal record
Representing Belgium
Olympic Games
Gold medal – first place	1920 Antwerp	-60 kg

François Theophilis "Frans" De Haes (28 July 1899 – 4 November 1923) was a Belgian weightlifter who won a gold medal at the 1920 Summer Olympics in Antwerp. He set one world record in the clean and jerk in 1922.

To escape the German occupation, his family fled Antwerp for the Netherlands, where he began weightlifting at age 17. After the war, he returned to Antwerp. While preparing for the 1924 Summer Olympics, he caught influenza and died at age 28.
