= Paadrema =

Village in Estonia

- village
- Location in Estonia
- Coordinates: 58°31′54″N 23°49′58″E
- Country: Estonia
- County: Pärnu County
- Municipality: Lääneranna Parish

Population (01.01.2011)
  - Total: 37

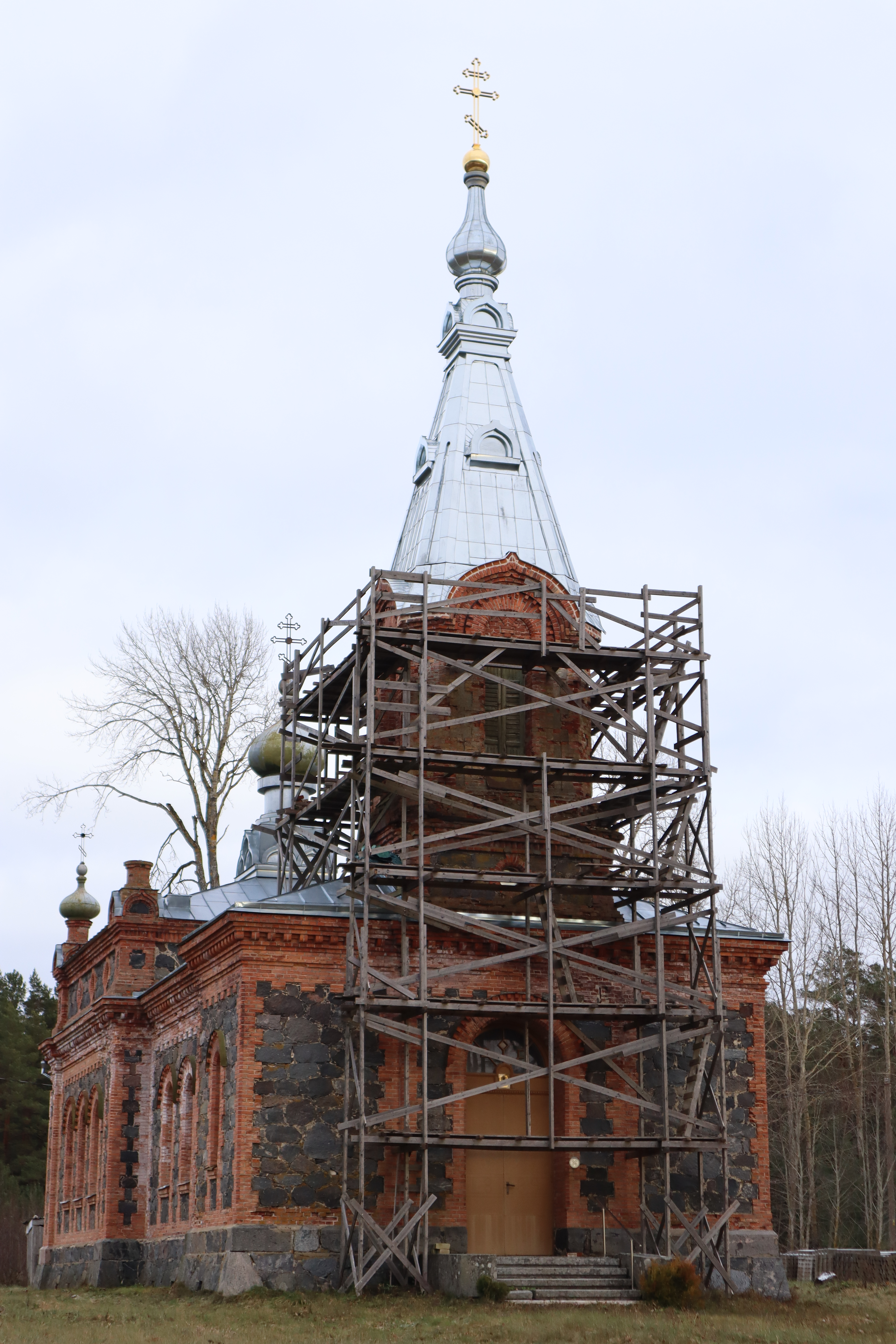
Paadrema Holy Trinity Church

Paadrema (German: Padenorm) is a village in Lääneranna Parish, Pärnu County, in southwestern Estonia. It had a population of 37 on 1 January 2011.

Paadremaa is the birthplace of wrestler Mihkel Müller (1887–1970).
