= Jan van Rensburg =

South African wrestler

Jan Joseph van Rensburg was a South African wrestler. He competed in the freestyle light heavyweight event at the 1920 Summer Olympics.
