= Gustave Kappeler =

French wrestler

- Born: 2 August 1881
- Died: Unknown

Gustave Kappeler (born 2 August 1881, date of death unknown) was a French wrestler. He competed in the freestyle light heavyweight event at the 1924 Summer Olympics.
