= George Rumpel =

Canadian wrestler

- Born: 19 September 1901; Kitchener, Ontario, Canada
- Died: 15 October 1983 (aged 82); Ponte Vedra Beach, Florida, United States

George Rumpel (19 September 1901 – 15 October 1983) was a Canadian wrestler. He competed in the freestyle light heavyweight event at the 1924 Summer Olympics.
