= Jean Hutmacher =

Belgian wrestler

- Born: 4 April 1892; Liège, Belgium

Jean Hutmacher (born 4 April 1892, date of death unknown) was a Belgian wrestler. He competed in the freestyle light heavyweight event at the 1924 Summer Olympics.
