= Taavi Tamminen =

Finnish wrestler (1889–1967)

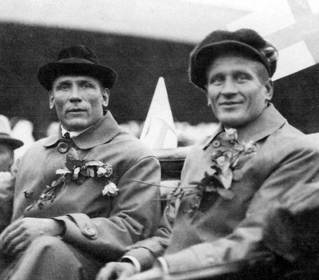
- Emil Väre and Taavi Tamminen (right) at the 1920 Olympics

Personal information
- Born: 10 March 1889 Uurainen, Central Finland
- Died: 19 January 1967 (aged 77) Helsinki, Finland
- Height: 174 cm (5 ft 9 in)
- Weight: 67–74 kg (148–163 lb)

Sport
- Sport: Greco-Roman wrestling
- Club: Viipurin Voimailijat, Vyborg
Medal record
Men's Greco-Roman wrestling
Representing Finland
Olympic Games
Silver medal – second place	1920 Antwerp	67.5 kg
World Championships
Gold medal – first place	1921 Helsinki	75 kg

Taavi Nikolai Tamminen (10 March 1889 – 19 January 1967) was a Greco-Roman wrestler from Finland. He won a silver Olympic medal in 1920, losing in the final to his clubmate Emil Väre, a world title in 1921, and a national title in 1922. After retiring from competitions, he worked as a wrestling referee and masseur, attending the 1936 Summer Olympics with the Finnish team.
