= Fabio Del Genovese =

Italian wrestler

- Born: 27 May 1902; Pisa, Italy
- Died: 6 April 1976 (aged 73); Pisa, Italy

Fabio Del Genovese (27 May 1902 – 6 April 1976) was an Italian wrestler. He competed in the freestyle light heavyweight event at the 1924 Summer Olympics.
