= Edvin Jensen =

Danish wrestler (1900–1975)

- Born: 6 July 1900; Copenhagen, Denmark
- Died: 19 November 1975 (aged 75); Gentofte, Denmark

Svend Edvin Arthur Jensen (6 July 1900 – 19 November 1975) was a Danish wrestler. He competed in the Greco-Roman featherweight event at the 1920 Summer Olympics.
