= Louis De Haes =

Belgian weightlifter

Personal information
- Full name: Ludovicus Gerardus De Haes
- Nationality: Belgian
- Born: 23 July 1896 Antwerp, Belgium

Sport
- Sport: Weightlifting

Louis De Haes (born 23 July 1896, date of death unknown) was a Belgian weightlifter. He competed in the men's featherweight event at the 1920 Summer Olympics. Fourteen athletes from eleven nations took part in the event, which was held on 29 August 1920.
