= Jack Spellman =

American wrestler and football player (1899–1966)

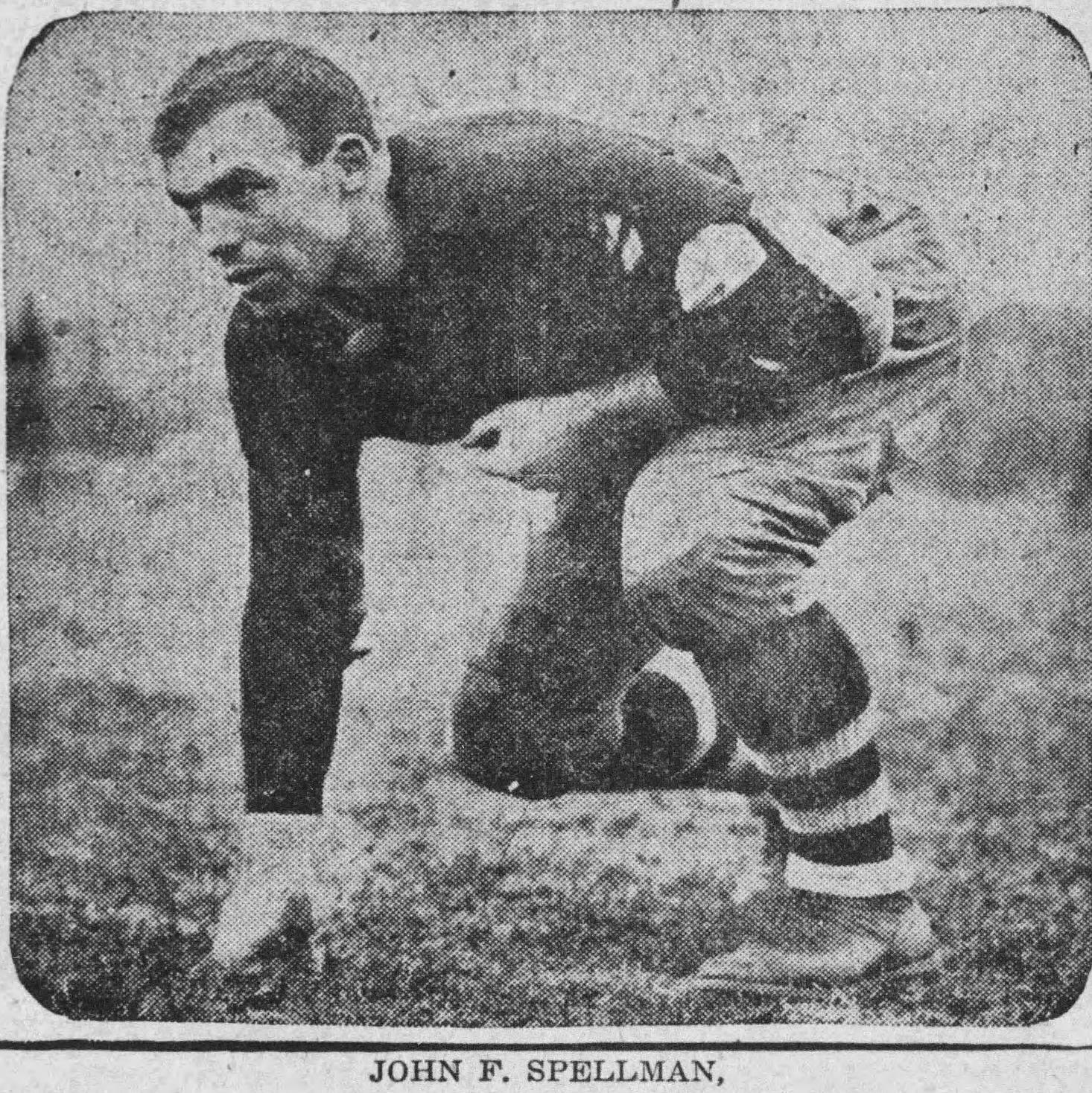
- Spellman as captain of the 1923 Brown Bears

Profile
- Position: End

Personal information
- Born: June 14, 1899; Middletown, Connecticut, U.S.
- Died: August 1, 1966 (aged 67); Mangula, Rhodesia
- Listed height: 5 ft 10 in (1.78 m)
- Listed weight: 201 lb (91 kg)

Career information
- High school: Enfield (CT)
- College: Brown

Career history
- Providence Steamrollers (1925–1931); Boston Braves (1932)

Awards and highlights
- NFL champion (1928); Olympic champion (1924)

Medal record

Men's freestyle wrestling

Representing the United States

Olympic Games
Gold medal – first place	1924 Paris	87 kg

John Franklin Spellman (June 14, 1899 – August 1, 1966) was an American wrestler and football player. He competed at the 1924 Olympic Games in freestyle wrestling, where he won a gold medal in the light heavyweight (87 kg) division. After college, Spellman became a professional wrestler and football player in the NFL. Spellman played American football as a right end for the Providence Steam Rollers and Boston Braves from 1925 to 1932.
