= Albert Savonet =

Belgian wrestler

- Born: 12 August 1894
- Died: Unknown

Albert Savonet (born 12 August 1894, date of death unknown) was a Belgian wrestler. He competed in the Greco-Roman lightweight event at the 1920 Summer Olympics.
