= Kees Tijman =

Dutch weightlifter

Personal information
- Nationality: Dutch
- Born: 12 June 1897; Amsterdam, Netherlands
- Died: 28 September 1954 (aged 57); Deventer, Netherlands

Sport
- Sport: Weightlifting

Kees Tijman (12 June 1897 – 28 September 1954) was a Dutch weightlifter. He competed in the men's featherweight event at the 1920 Summer Olympics.
