= Henri Joudiou =

French wrestler

- Born: 16 March 1889; Paris, France
- Died: 4 January 1978 (aged 88); Créteil, France

Henri Lucien Joudiou (16 March 1889 – 4 January 1978) was a French wrestler. He competed in the freestyle lightweight event at the 1920 Summer Olympics.
