= Eduard van den Bril =

Belgian wrestler

- Olympic team: Belgium

Eduard van den Bril was a Belgian wrestler. He competed in the Greco-Roman heavyweight event at the 1920 Summer Olympics.
