= Johannes Nolten Sr. =

Dutch wrestler

Johannes Nolten
- Born: 27 October 1888; Etten-Leur, Netherlands
- Died: 25 February 1944 (aged 55); The Hague, Netherlands

Johannes Nolten (27 October 1888 – 25 February 1944) was a Dutch wrestler. He competed in the Greco-Roman lightweight event at the 1920 Summer Olympics.
