= Luigi Gatti (weightlifter) =

Italian weightlifter

Luigi Gatto
Personal information
- Nationality: Italian

Sport
- Sport: Weightlifting

Luigi Gatto was an Italian weightlifter. He competed in the men's featherweight event at the 1920 Summer Olympics.
