= Némo Bovis =

French wrestler

Personal information
- Nationality: French
- Born: 6 May 1887
- Died: Unknown

Sport
- Sport: Wrestling

Némo Bovis (born 6 May 1887, date of death unknown) was a French wrestler. He competed in the Greco-Roman featherweight event at the 1920 Summer Olympics.
