= Jean Ducher =

French weightlifter

Personal information
- Nationality: French

Sport
- Sport: Weightlifting

Jean Ducher was a French weightlifter. He competed in the men's featherweight event at the 1920 Summer Olympics.
