= Gottfrid Lindgren =

Swedish wrestler

- Born: 13 September 1892; Malmö, Sweden
- Died: 18 December 1975 (aged 83); Malmö, Sweden

Gottfrid Lindgren (13 September 1892 – 18 December 1975) was a Swedish wrestler. He competed in the freestyle middleweight event at the 1920 Summer Olympics.
