= Pierre Angelot =

French wrestler

Pierre Angelot was a French wrestler. He competed in the freestyle middleweight event at the 1920 Summer Olympics.
