= Holger Lindberg =

Swedish wrestler (1894–1966)

- Born: 20 August 1894; Borås, Sweden
- Died: 2 July 1966 (aged 71); Båstad, Sweden

Karl Holger Lindberg (20 August 1894 – 2 July 1966) was a Swedish wrestler.

Lindberg was born in Borås, Sweden, and represented Upsala AK. Lindberg won the 1915 and 1920 national titles in Greco-Roman lightweight. He competed in the Greco-Roman lightweight event at the 1920 Summer Olympics, where he lost in the second round. He died in Båstad.
