= Piero Vaglio =

Italian wrestler (1888–1964)

- Born: 12 February 1888; Milan, Kingdom of Italy
- Died: 17 May 1964 (aged 76); Albese con Cassano, Italy

Piero Vaglio (12 February 1888 – 17 May 1964) was an Italian wrestler. He competed in the Greco-Roman featherweight event at the 1920 Summer Olympics.
