= Giorgio Calz =

Italian wrestler

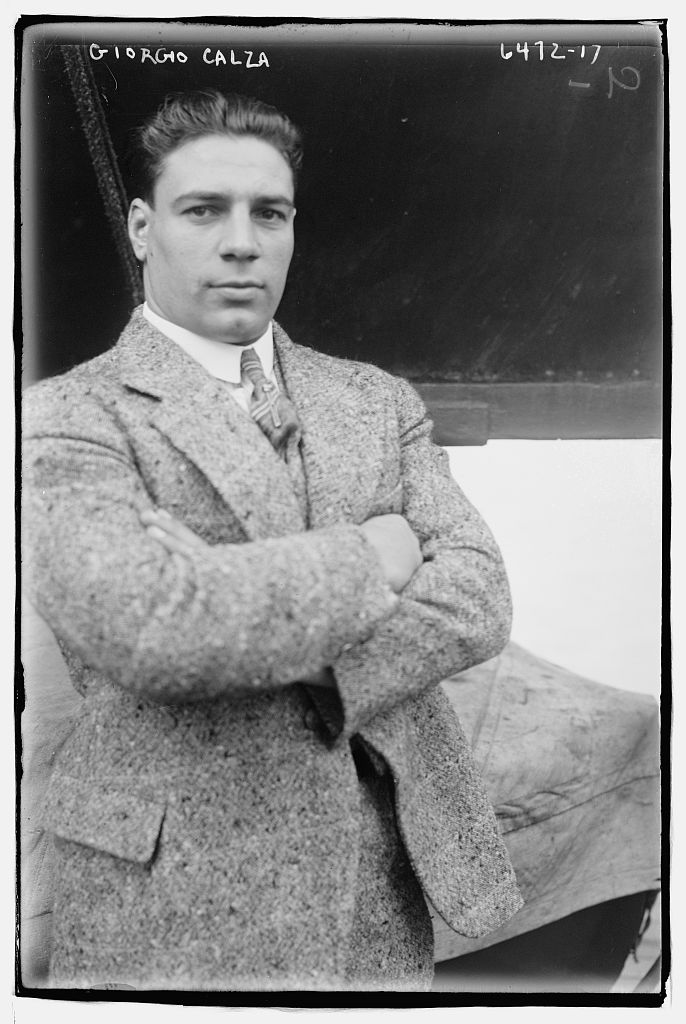
- Born: 20 July 1900; Trieste, Italy
- Died: 31 March 1970 (aged 69); Trieste, Italy

Giorgio Calz (20 July 1900 – 31 March 1970) was an Italian wrestler. He competed in the Greco-Roman heavyweight event at the 1920 Summer Olympics.
