= Niels Florin =

Danish weightlifter

Personal information
- Nationality: Danish
- Born: 3 October 1892 Helsingør, Denmark
- Died: 17 August 1949 (aged 56) Copenhagen, Denmark

Sport
- Sport: Weightlifting

Niels Sophus Valdemar Florin (3 October 1892 – 17 August 1949) was a Danish weightlifter. He competed in the men's featherweight event at the 1920 Summer Olympics.
