= Ludvík Wágner =

Czech weightlifter

Personal information
- Nationality: Czech
- Born: 22 June 1894 Vienna
- Died: Unknown

Sport
- Sport: Weightlifting

Ludvík Hugo Wenzel Wágner (born 1894, date of death unknown) was a Czech weightlifter. He competed in the men's featherweight event at the 1920 Summer Olympics.
