= Michel Dechmann =

Luxembourgish wrestler

- Born: 4 November 1896; Luxembourg City, Luxembourg
- Died: 12 September 1957 (aged 60); Luxembourg City, Luxembourg

Michel Dechmann (4 November 1896 – 12 September 1957) was a Luxembourgish wrestler. He competed in the Greco-Roman middleweight event at the 1920 Summer Olympics.
