= Amerigo Corsanego =

Italian wrestler

Carlo Amerigo Corsanego was an Italian wrestler. He competed in the Greco-Roman middleweight event at the 1920 Summer Olympics.
