= Eugène Ryter =

Swiss weightlifter

Olympic medal record

Men's Weightlifting
Bronze medal – third place	1920 Antwerp	-60 kg

Eugène Ryter (23 March 1890 – 8 March 1973) was a Swiss weightlifter who competed in the 1920 Summer Olympics. In 1920, he won the bronze medal in the featherweight class.
