= Herbert Wright (wrestler) =

British wrestler (1894–1982)

Olympic medal record

Men's freestyle wrestling

Representing Great Britain

Olympic Games
Bronze medal – third place	1920 Antwerp	Lightweight

Herbert Arthur Wright (16 September 1894 – 23 September 1982) was a British wrestler who competed in the 1920 Summer Olympics. In 1920, he won the bronze medal in the freestyle wrestling lightweight class after winning the bronze medal match against August Thys.
