= Pierre Ledron =

French wrestler

Pierre Ledron was a French wrestler. He competed in the freestyle light heavyweight event at the 1920 Summer Olympics.
