= Mylläri (surname) =

Mylläri literally meaning "miller" is an occupational surname of Finnish language origin. Notable people with the surname include:

- Anton Mylläri, Swedish ice hockey player
- Mika Mylläri, Finnish musician
- Iisak Mylläri, Finnish wrestler
