= Vasilios Vouyoukos =

Greek wrestler

Vasilios Vouyoukos was a Greek wrestler. He competed in the Greco-Roman lightweight event at the 1920 Summer Olympics.
