= Willem Roels =

Dutch wrestler

- Born: 22 August 1889; Delft, Netherlands
- Died: 18 March 1951 (aged 61); Zaandam, Netherlands

Willem Roels (22 August 1889 – 18 March 1951) was a Dutch wrestler. He competed in the Greco-Roman featherweight event at the 1920 Summer Olympics.
