= François Meyer (wrestler) =

French wrestler

François Meyer was a French wrestler. He competed in the freestyle light heavyweight event at the 1920 Summer Olympics.
