= Jan Kraus (wrestler) =

Czech wrestler

- Born: 4 November 1887; Lipník nad Bečvou

Jan Kraus (born 4 November 1887, date of death unknown) was a Czech wrestler. He competed in the Greco-Roman heavyweight event at the 1920 Summer Olympics.
