= Adrian Brian =

American wrestler (1892–1978)

- Born: March 16, 1892; Columbus, Nebraska, U.S.
- Died: September 8, 1978 (aged 86); Tucson, Arizona, U.S.

Adrian Brian (March 16, 1892 – September 8, 1978) was an American wrestler. He competed in the Greco-Roman featherweight event at the 1920 Summer Olympics.
