= Artur Kukk =

Estonian wrestler (1889–1958)

- Born: 22 June 1889; Hämeenlinna, Grand Duchy of Finland
- Died: 19 April 1958 (aged 68); Tallinn, then part of Estonian SSR, Soviet Union

Artur Kukk (22 June 1889 – 19 April 1958) was an Estonian wrestler, speed skater, boxer and sports figure. He competed in the Greco-Roman heavyweight event at the 1920 Summer Olympics.
