= Joseph Shimmon =

American wrestler

Personal information
- Born: July 4, 1894 Urmia, Iran
- Died: February 9, 1992 (aged 97) Modesto, California, U.S.
- Home town: Manhattan, New York, U.S.

Sport
- Country: United States
- Sport: Freestyle and Folkstyle
- College team: Columbia
- Club: New York Athletic Club
- Team: USA

Joseph Malek Shimmon (July 4, 1894 – February 9, 1992) was an American wrestler. He competed in the freestyle lightweight event at the 1920 Summer Olympics, where he reached the quarterfinals.
