= George Metropoulos =

American wrestler

Personal information
- Nationality: Greece; United States
- Born: March 15, 1896 Moschochori, Greece

Sport
- Sport: Wrestling
- Events: Greco-Roman and Freestyle

George John Metropoulos (born March 15, 1896, date of death unknown) was an American wrestler. He competed in the Greco-Roman lightweight and the freestyle lightweight events at the 1920 Summer Olympics. He was naturalized as a U.S. citizen in June 1920, just in time for the 1920 Olympics.
