= Théodore Bainconneau =

French wrestler

Théodore Bainçonau
- Born: 25 November 1887; Biarritz, France
- Died: 10 October 1972 (aged 84); Saint-Jean-de-Luz, France

Jean Théodore Bainconneau (25 November 1887 – 10 October 1972) was a French wrestler. He competed in the Greco-Roman lightweight event at the 1920 Summer Olympics.
