= André Gasiglia =

French wrestler

- Born: 2 September 1885

André Gasiglia (born 2 September 1885, date of death unknown), also known as Armand Gasiglia, was a French wrestler. He competed in the Greco-Roman heavyweight event at the 1920 Summer Olympics.
