= Emil Christensen (wrestler) =

Danish wrestler (1890–1973)

- Born: 23 November 1890; Frederiksberg, Denmark
- Died: 10 October 1973 (aged 82); Copenhagen, Denmark

Emil Arthur Marius Christensen (23 November 1890 – 10 October 1973) was a Danish wrestler. He competed in the Greco-Roman middleweight event at the 1920 Summer Olympics.
