= Harald Vasbotten =

Norwegian sport wrestler

- Born: 9 November 1893; Lenvik, Norway
- Died: 15 March 1973 (aged 79); Oslo, Norway

Harald Vasbotten (9 November 1893 – 15 March 1973) was a Norwegian sport wrestler.

He was born in Lenvik Municipality and represented the club Fagforeningens IL. He competed in Greco-Roman wrestling at the 1920 Summer Olympics, in the heavyweight class. He was awarded the King's Cup at the national championships in 1917.
