= Iisak Mylläri =

Finnish wrestler

- Born: 15 December 1894; Saint Petersburg, Russian Empire
- Died: 23 October 1967 (aged 72)

Iisak Mylläri (15 December 1894 – 23 October 1967) was a Finnish wrestler. He competed in the freestyle light heavyweight event at the 1924 Summer Olympics.
