= Charles Backsman =

French wrestler

Charles Backsman was a French wrestler. He competed in the freestyle middleweight event at the 1920 Summer Olympics.
