= Charles Courant =

Swiss wrestler (1896–1982)

- Born: 14 April 1896
- Died: 26 June 1982 (aged 86); Vaud, Switzerland
Medal record
Men's freestyle wrestling
Representing Switzerland
Olympic Games
| Silver medal – second place | 1920 Antwerp | 82.5 kg |
| Bronze medal – third place | 1924 Paris | 87 kg |

Charles Courant (14 April 1896 – 26 June 1982) was a Swiss freestyle wrestler and Olympic medalist. He competed at the 1920 Summer Olympics in Antwerp where he won a silver medal. He won a bronze medal at the 1924 Summer Olympics in Paris.
