= Alfred Schmidt (weightlifter) =

Estonian weightlifter

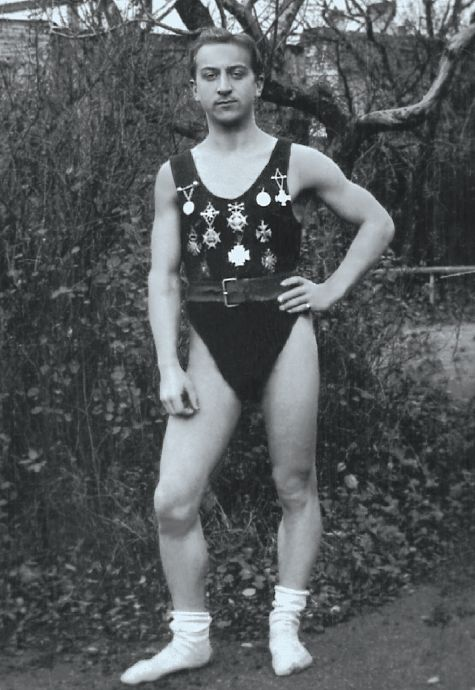

Personal information
- Born: 1 May 1898 Hageri, Governorate of Estonia, Russian Empire
- Died: 5 November 1972 (aged 74) Tallinn, then part of Estonian SSR, Soviet Union
- Weight: 60 kg (132 lb)

Sport
- Sport: Weightlifting
- Club: Olümpia Tallinn
- Coached by: Alfred Neuland
Medal record
Representing Estonia
Olympic Games
Silver medal – second place	1920 Antwerp	-60 kg

Alfred Schmidt (from 1936 Ain Sillak, 1 May 1898 – 5 November 1972) was an Estonian featherweight weightlifter who won a silver medal at the 1920 Summer Olympics.

Schmidt first trained in long-distance running, and took up weightlifting in 1919 while serving in the Estonian Army. The next year he won an Olympic silver medal, and in 1922 a national title. At the 1922 World Championships he was not allowed to compete, as he surpassed the body weight limit of his division, and hence acted as an official and referee. He continued to act in this capacity after retiring from competitions in 1923. He also refereed wrestling competitions and was a board member of the Estonian Sports Union. Later he became known as a trap shooter and referee, and headed the Estonian Trap Shooting Federation.
