= Sjur Johnsen =

Norwegian wrestler and track and field athlete

- Born: 20 June 1891; Vik, Norway
- Died: 2 October 1978 (aged 87); Bergen, Norway

Sjur Johnsen (20 June 1891 – 2 October 1978) was a Norwegian wrestler and track and field athlete.

== Life and career ==
Johnsen was born in Vik. He competed in wrestling at the 1920 Summer Olympics in Antwerp where he placed fourth in Greco-Roman middleweight, after losing the bronze match to Masa Perttilä. He was a national champion in 1920 and 1922.

Competing in track and field athletics, Johnsen won six national titles in hammer throw between 1923 and 1932.

Johnsen died in Bergen on 2 October 1978.
