= Léonard Bron =

Swiss wrestler

- Born: 27 February 1898
- Died: 4 June 1980 (aged 82)

Léonard Bron (27 February 1898 – 4 June 1980) was a Swiss wrestler. He competed in the freestyle middleweight event at the 1920 Summer Olympics.
