= Maurice Vanderleenden =

Belgian wrestler (1893–1971)

Emilius Petrus "Emiel" Vanderleenden
- Born: 27 September 1893; Ghent, Belgium
- Died: 1971 (aged 77–78); New York City, U.S.
- Olympic team: Belgium

Emiel Vanderleenden (27 September 1893 – May 1971) was a Belgian wrestler. He competed in the Greco-Roman middleweight event at the 1920 Summer Olympics.
