= Johan Gallén =

Finnish wrestler

- Born: 28 April 1888; Lohja, Finland
- Died: 17 September 1962 (aged 74); Helsinki, Finland

Johan Vilhelm Gallén (28 April 1888 – 17 September 1962) was a Finnish wrestler. He competed in the freestyle light heavyweight event at the 1920 Summer Olympics.
