= Poul Hansen (sport wrestler) =

Danish wrestler (1891–1948)

Personal information
- Born: 20 October 1891 Ubberud, Odense Municipality, Denmark
- Died: 29 October 1948 (aged 57) Aarhus, Denmark
Medal record
Men's Greco-Roman wrestling
Representing Denmark
Olympic Games
| Silver medal – second place | 1920 Antwerp | Heavyweight |

Poul Henrik Peder Hansen (20 October 1891 – 29 October 1948) was a Danish wrestler who competed in the 1920 Summer Olympics, and in the 1924 Summer Olympics. He was born in Ubberud, Odense Municipality and died in Aarhus.

In 1920 he won the silver medal in the Greco-Roman heavyweight competition after winning the final of the silver medal round against Edward Willkie. Four years later he competed in the Greco-Roman heavyweight event as well as in the freestyle wrestling light-heavyweight class but was not able to win a medal.
