= Maurice Rohon =

French wrestler

Maurice Rohon (17 May 1881 – 30 June 1943) was a French wrestler. He competed in the Greco-Roman lightweight event at the 1920 Summer Olympics.
