= Alexandre Boumans =

Belgian wrestler

- Born: 22 April 1893
- Died: 6 November 1952 (aged 59); Antwerp, Belgium

Alexandre Boumans (22 April 1893 – 6 November 1952) was a Belgian wrestler. He competed in the Greco-Roman featherweight event at the 1920 Summer Olympics.
