= Gustaf Nilsson (wrestler) =

Swedish wrestler (1899–1980)

- Full name: Gustaf Rudolf Nilsson
- Born: 2 March 1899; Landskrona, Sweden
- Died: 26 January 1980 (aged 80); Landskrona, Sweden
- Olympic team: 1920

Gustaf Rudolf Nilsson (2 March 1899 – 26 January 1980) was a Swedish wrestler. He competed in the Greco-Roman lightweight event at the 1920 Summer Olympics, being eliminated by Richard Frydenlund in round two.

Nilsson competed for the Landskrona club Argos. He was referred to as "the Scanian lion". Nilsson was also a Swedish champion, and repeatedly earned second place in the Swedish championships.
