= Sotirios Notaris (wrestler) =

Greek wrestler

- Born: 1896; Istanbul, Ottoman Empire
- Died: 1971 (aged 74–75)

Sotirios Notaris (1896 – 1971) was a Greek wrestler. He competed in the Greco-Roman middleweight event at the 1920 Summer Olympics.
