= Pierre Derkinderen =

Belgian wrestler

Pierre Derkinderen was a Belgian wrestler. He competed in the freestyle middleweight event at the 1920 Summer Olympics.
