= Fritz Christiansen =

Danish wrestler (1889–1955)

- Born: 27 January 1889; Copenhagen
- Died: 8 August 1955 (aged 66)

Fritz Peter Boye Christiansen (27 January 1889 – 8 August 1955) was a Danish wrestler. He competed in the Greco-Roman lightweight event at the 1920 Summer Olympics.
