= Josef Struna =

Czech wrestler

- Born: 31 March 1895; Prague

Josef Struna (born 31 March 1895, date of death unknown) was a Czech wrestler. He competed in the Greco-Roman heavyweight event at the 1920 Summer Olympics.
