= Jules Deligny =

French wrestler

Jules Deligny was a French wrestler. He competed in the freestyle lightweight event at the 1920 Summer Olympics.
