= Einar Stensrud =

Norwegian wrestler

- Born: 13 January 1895; Hamar, Norway
- Died: 12 July 1964 (aged 69); Oslo, Norway

Einar Jørgensen Stensrud (13 January 1895 – 12 July 1964) was a Norwegian sport wrestler. He was born in Hamar. He competed in Greco-Roman wrestling at the 1920 Summer Olympics, in the middleweight class. He was awarded the King's Cup at the national championships in 1928.
