= Henry Szymanski =

American wrestler

Henry I. Szymanski
- Born: July 4, 1898; Chicago, Illinois, U.S.
- Died: November 6, 1959 (aged 61); Colorado Springs, Colorado, U.S.

Henry Ignacio Szymanski (July 4, 1898 – November 6, 1959) was an American wrestler. He competed in the Greco-Roman middleweight event at the 1920 Summer Olympics.
