= Willem Leloux =

Dutch wrestler

- Born: 7 March 1893; Haarlem, Netherlands
- Died: 15 September 1960 (aged 67); Amsterdam, Netherlands

Willem Johannes Leloux (7 March 1893 – 15 September 1960) was a Dutch wrestler. He competed in the Greco-Roman middleweight event at the 1920 Summer Olympics.
