= Dimitrios Vergos =

Greek athlete

- Dimitrios with spouse Malama

Personal information
- Nationality: Greek
- Born: 8 May 1886 Agios Efstratios
- Died: 3 January 1956 (aged 69) Alexandria, Egypt

Sport
- Country: Greece
- Sport: wrestling, weightlifting, shot put

Dimitrios Vergos (Greek: Δημήτριος Βέργος, Agios Efstratios 8 May 1886 - Alexandria, Egypt 3 January 1956) was a Greek champion in wrestling, weightlifting and shot put.

== Biography ==
Dimitrios Vergos was the son of Nicholas and Helen Vergos Kleitsou. His father was the secretary and treasurer of the six-member Church Committee, managing ecclesiastical and educational matters in the country. He served in the Greek Army, from which he was dismissed on 23 June 1916. He later re-enlisted and fought in the expansionist wars of Greece against Turkey for the conquest of Asia Minor, according to a 1920 document permitting him to participate in athletic competitions. In 1939 he and his brothers Constantine and Stylianos gave a plot of land to the community, where a post office and community school were built.

== Athletic career ==
He was involved in wrestling, weightlifting and shot put. He was an athlete of the Alexandria Sport Fans Association, Milo Alexandria and of Panellinios.

Vergos' athletic career began 8 May 1909 when he participated in athletic games in Alexandria, organized by the local Greek Sport Fans Association. In these games, Vergos came first in one-arm weightlifting with 78 kg and in two-handed weightlifting with 110 kg. He also came second in shot, behind K. Goulakis who threw 9,77 m.

In 1910 he participated in the joint Panhellenic-Panegyptian Games, organized by the Alexandria Sport Fans Association (the only time the SEGAS panhellenic championship was held in Egypt), and was again first in both styles of weightlifting, with 119.5 kg in the two-handed and 76 kg in the one-handed form.

In 1912 he was panhellenic champion in wrestling, participating as a member of the Alexandria Sport Fans Association. As the current champion he was selected by the Greek Olympic Committee to be part of the team going to the 1912 Summer Olympics in Stockholm.

=== 1920 Olympics ===
Dimitris Vergos participated in the 1920 Summer Olympics in the Belgium city of Antwerp. He participated in Greco-Roman and freestyle wrestling along with Sotirios Notaras and Pavlidis Vasileios. His place in the Olympic team was secured after taking part in qualifying events held on 21 June 1920 at the Panathenaic Stadium, where he came first in heavy weights. Olympic records indicate that he participated in the Greco-heavy and medium weights in freestyle wrestling.

In Greco-Roman he wrestled heavyweight, and lost the second round via knockout to Dutch Jaap Sjouwerman, placing twelfth. According to a report the public protested strongly about the referees decision in this match.

He also participated in instrument category weights. He reached the second round but was defeated by the Swede Otto Borgström, achieving ninth place.

== Titles ==
- Greece
  - Two hand lift, 1910: 119.5 Mr.
  - One hand lift, 1910: 76 Mr.
  - Wrestling Heavyweight: 1912.
- Winner Panhellenic Games in the Olympic qualifier 1920
  - Wrestling heavyweight.
- Olympic Games 1920
  - Greco-Roman heavyweight: 12th
  - Unlimited media weights: 9th.
