= Oscar Cornelis =

Belgian wrestler

Oscar Cornelis was a Belgian wrestler. He competed in the Greco-Roman middleweight event at the 1920 Summer Olympics.
