= Mihkel Müller =

Estonian wrestler

- Born: 21 October 1887; Paadrema, Governorate of Estonia
- Died: 19 December 1970 (aged 83); Helsinki, Finland

Mihkel Müller (21 October 1887 – 19 December 1970) was an Estonia wrestler. He represented Estonia in the Greco-Roman middleweight event at the 1920 Summer Olympics.
