= Wilhelm Olsen =

Norwegian wrestler

- Born: 12 May 1891; Oslo, Norway
- Died: 6 April 1971 (aged 79); Oslo, Norway

Wilhelm Olsen (12 May 1891 – 6 April 1971) was a Norwegian wrestler. He competed in the Greco-Roman featherweight event at the 1920 Summer Olympics. He represented the club Fagforeningernes TIF
