= Leopold Tõnson =

Estonian military personnel and sport personnel

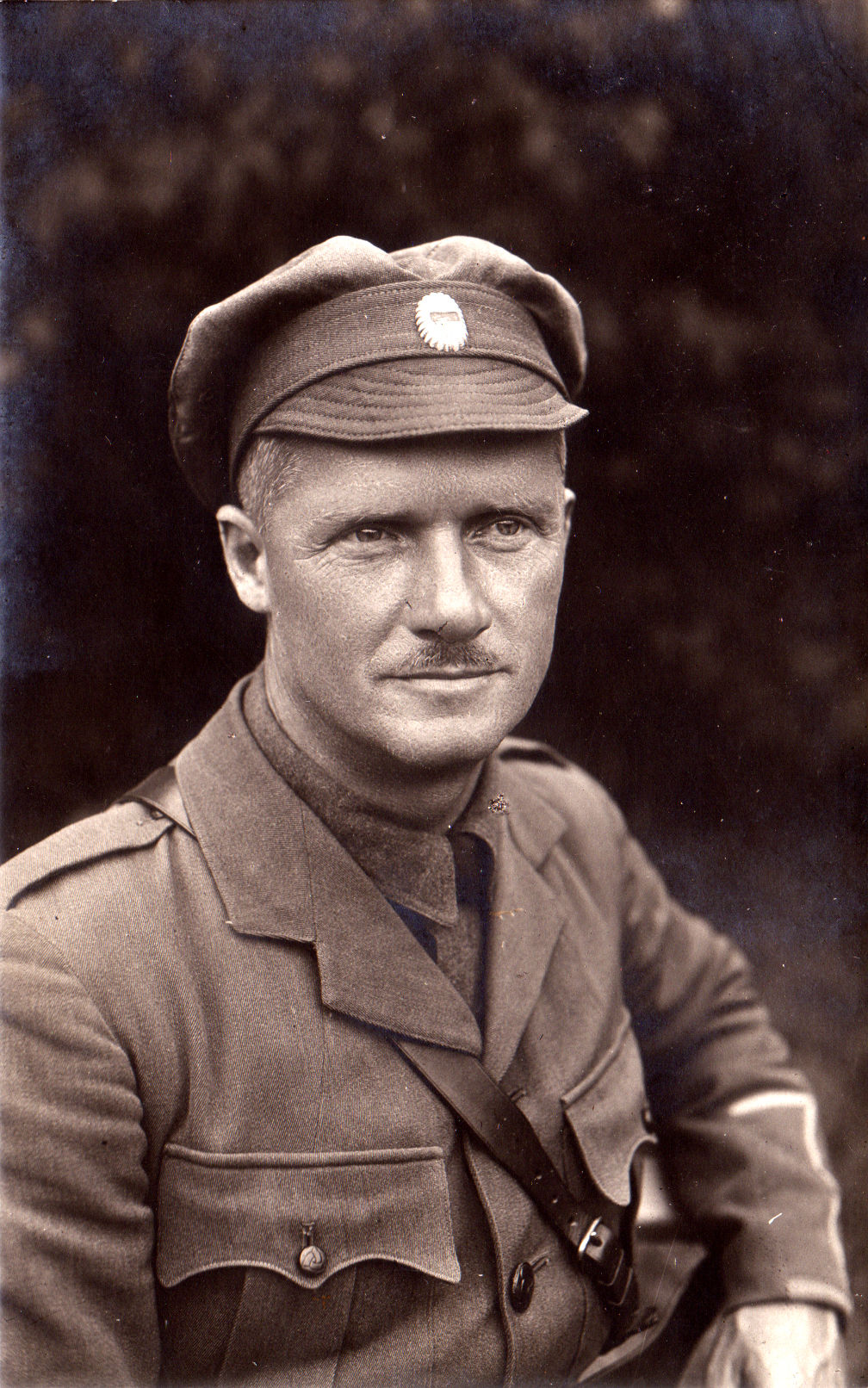
Leopold Tõnson

Leopold Tõnson (13 January 1878, in Paldiski (or 14 January 1874, in Haapsalu) – 5 January 1935, in Tallinn) was an Estonian military personnel and sport personnel.

He was one of the first in Estonia who started to propagate athletics, rowing and bandy. In 1909 he managed the first athletics competition in Tallinn; he himself won this competition.

During the Estonian War of Independence, he was the commander of Kalev Infantry Battalion.

From 1911 to 1913, 1918 to 1919, 1922 and 1924 to 1928 he was the head of Estonian Sports Association Kalev.

Awards:

- 1931: Order of the Cross of the Eagle, III class.
