= William Fiskar =

Estonian footballer and sport personnel

William Jakob Fiskar (also, Villiam Fiskar; 14 April 1890 – 26 February 1942) was an Estonian Major of the Estonian Land Forces, footballer and sports figure.

He was born in Tallinn. From 1910-1910 he played for football club Meteor and 1911–1912 he played football and bandy for sport club Kalev. He was one of the founders of Estonian Football Federation. 1920 and 1924 he was a member of Olympic delegation of Estonia.

He participated in the Estonian War of Independence.

In 1924, he took part in the crackdown of the 1924 Estonian coup d'état attempt staged by Communists (mostly infiltrators from the Soviet Union), who attempted to overthrow the Estonian government. In 1926 graduated from Estonian Military Academy and also studied at the University of Tartu's Faculty of Law from 1922 until 1926 and from 1933 until 1934. He left the Defence Forces in 1928 and went to work at the Pikalaenu Bank in Tallinn, where in 1937 he became secretary.

He was a polyglot: he spoke 6-7 foreign languages.

Following the Soviet occupation of Estonia during World War II, Fiskar was arrested by Soviet authorities on 20 December 1940 and held in prison on charges of possible espionage. On 20 March 1941, under the Nachumsiedlung agreement between the Soviet Union and Nazi Germany, Fiskar was transferred to German authorities who imprisoned him in a Nazi concentration camp for suspected anti-German activity and executed in 1942 at Oranienburg concentration camp. His ashes were ultimately scattered in Rahumäe Cemetery in Tallinn.
