= Charley Johnson (wrestler) =

American wrestler (1887–1967)

Personal information
- Nationality: Sweden; United States
- Born: January 31, 1887 Gothenburg, Sweden
- Died: September 17, 1967 (aged 80) Los Angeles, California, U.S.
- Home town: Boston, Massachusetts, U.S.
Medal record
Men's freestyle wrestling
Representing the United States
Olympic Games
Bronze medal – third place	1920 Antwerp	75 kg

Charles Frithiof Johnson (January 31, 1887 – September 17, 1967) was an American wrestler who competed in the 1920 Summer Olympics. He was born in Gothenburg. In 1920, he won the bronze medal in the freestyle wrestling middleweight class after winning the bronze medal match against Angus Frantz.
