= Oskari Friman =

Finnish wrestler (1893–1933)

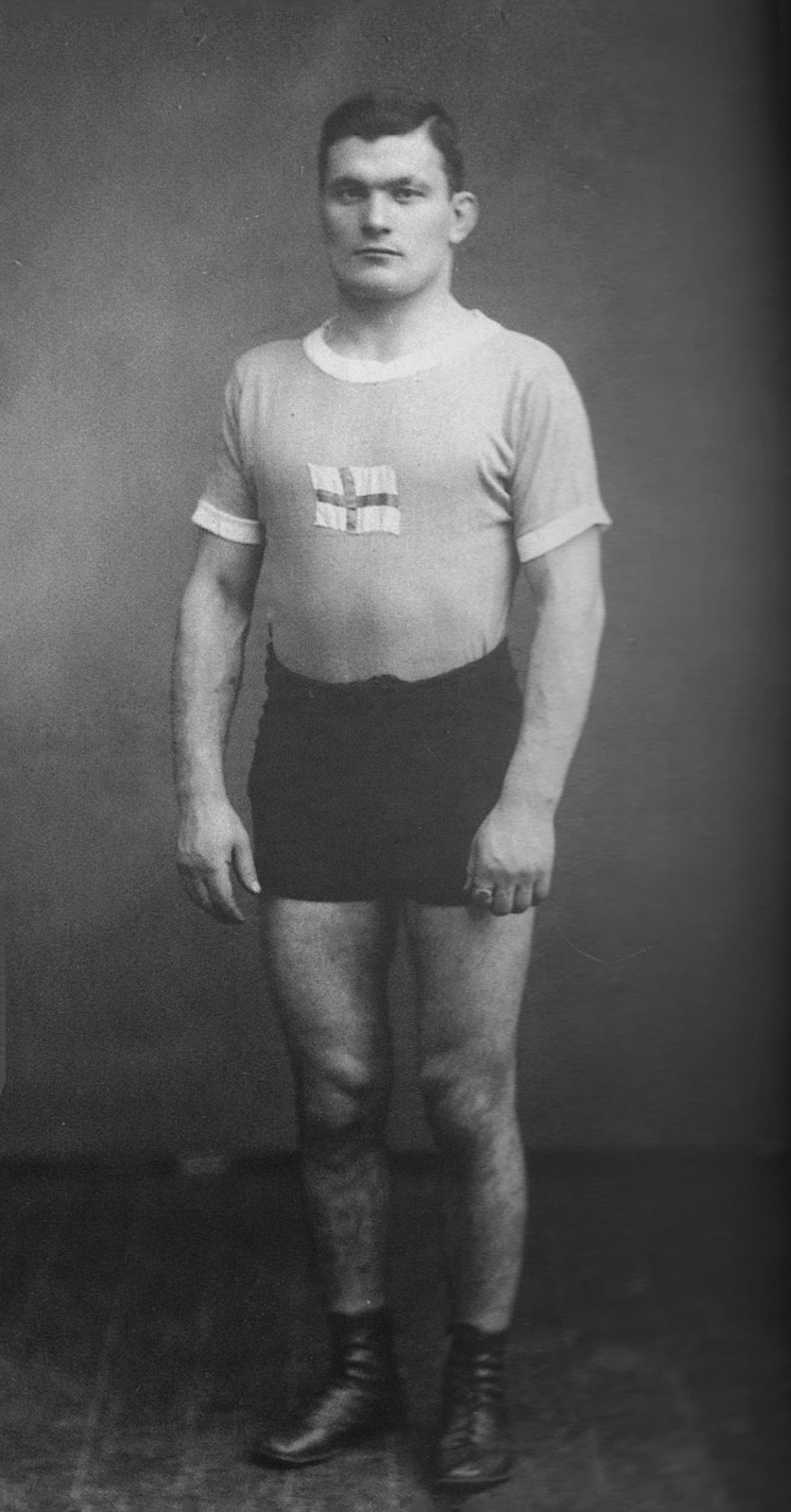

Personal information
- Born: 27 January 1893 Vahviala, Viipuri Province, Grand Duchy of Finland
- Died: 19 October 1933 (aged 40) Viipuri, Finland

Sport
- Sport: Greco-Roman wrestling
- Club: Viipurin Voimailijat
Medal record
Men's Greco-Roman wrestling
Representing Finland
Olympic Games
Gold medal – first place	1920 Antwerp	Featherweight
Gold medal – first place	1924 Paris	Lightweight
World Championships
Gold medal – first place	1921 Helsinki	67.5 kg

Oskar David "Oskari" Friman (27 January 1893 – 19 October 1933) was a Greco-Roman wrestler from Finland. He won gold medals in lightweight categories at the 1920 and 1924 Olympics and 1921 World Championships. Nationally he collected eleven Finnish titles, in 1915–1924 and 1928.

Friman took up wrestling in 1908, and by 1915 became one of the best Finnish lightweight wrestlers, together with his clubmate Emil Väre. Because of World War I, he started competing internationally only at the 1920 Olympics, where he dropped to featherweight to avoid meeting Väre. Väre retired soon after that, and Friman returned to lightweight. During those years he worked as a butcher and tinsmith, but later, when he became famous and retired from competitions, he was hired as head coach of the Finnish and Swedish national wrestling teams.
