= Josef Beránek (wrestler) =

Czech wrestler

- Born: 6 December 1891; Havlíčkův Brod, Austria-Hungary
- Died: 6 July 1959 (aged 67); Prague, Czechoslovakia

Josef Beránek (6 December 1891 – 6 July 1959) was a Czech wrestler. He competed for Bohemia at the 1912 Summer Olympics and for Czechoslovakia at the 1920 Summer Olympics and 1924 Summer Olympics.
