= Jaap Sjouwerman =

Dutch wrestler

- Born: 27 May 1891; Amsterdam, Netherlands
- Died: 21 February 1964 (aged 72); Blaricum, Netherlands

Jaap Sjouwerman (27 May 1891 – 21 February 1964) was a Dutch wrestler. He competed at the 1920 and the 1924 Summer Olympics.
