= František Kopřiva =

Czech wrestler

- Born: 30 July 1892; Prague, Austria-Hungary

František Kopřiva (30 July 1892 - 30 January 1940) was a Czech wrestler. He competed for Bohemia at the 1912 Summer Olympics and for Czechoslovakia at the 1920 Summer Olympics.
