= Frithjof Andersen =

Norwegian Greco-Roman wrestler

Personal information
- Born: 5 April 1893 Oslo, Norway
- Died: 24 July 1975 (aged 82) Oslo, Norway
Medal record
Men's Greco-Roman wrestling
Representing Norway
Olympic Games
Bronze medal – third place	1920 Antwerp	Lightweight

Frithjof Andersen (5 April 1893 – 24 July 1975) is a Norwegian wrestler and Olympic medalist in Greco-Roman wrestling, from Oslo.

== Career ==
Andersen competed at the 1920 Summer Olympics in Antwerp, where he won a bronze medal in Greco-Roman wrestling, the lightweight class. His bronze medal was Norway’s first Olympic medal in Greco-Roman wrestling.
