= Angus Frantz =

American wrestler

Personal information
- Born: June 20, 1895 Duluth, Minnesota, U.S.
- Died: July 16, 1973 (aged 78) New York, New York, U.S.

Sport
- Country: United States
- Sport: Wrestling
- Events: Freestyle and Folkstyle
- College team: Princeton
- Club: New York Athletic Club
- Team: USA

Angus Frantz (June 20, 1895 – July 16, 1973) was an American wrestler. He competed in the freestyle middleweight event at the 1920 Summer Olympics.
