= Anders Larsson (wrestler) =

Swedish wrestler (1892–1945)

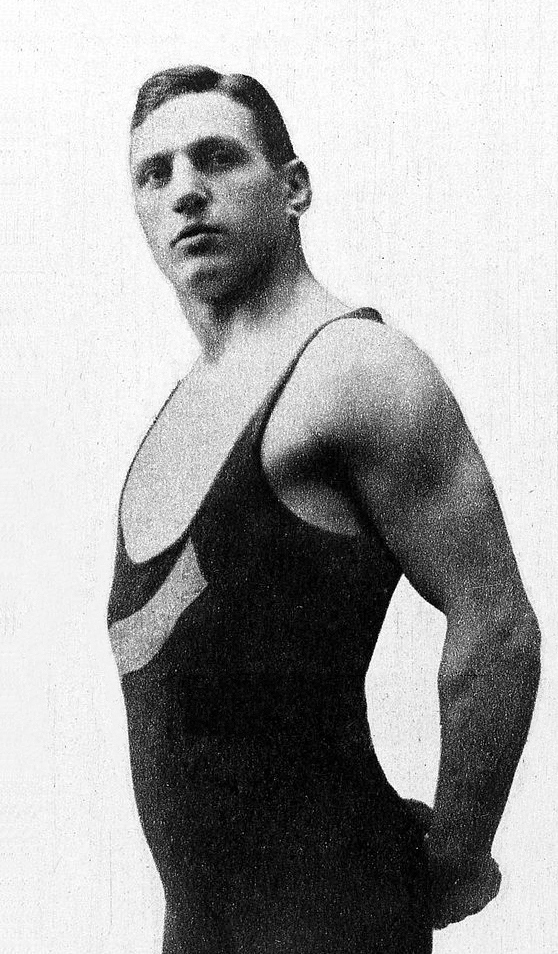
- Anders Larsson in 1920

Personal information
- Born: 2 July 1892 Varberg, Sweden
- Died: 4 January 1945 (aged 52) Gothenburg, Sweden

Sport
- Sport: Freestyle wrestling
- Club: Göteborgs AK
Medal record
Men's freestyle wrestling
Representing Sweden
Olympic Games
Gold medal – first place	1920 Antwerp	82.5 kg

Anders Larsson (2 July 1892 – 4 January 1945) was a Swedish freestyle wrestler who won the gold medal in the light-heavyweight class at the 1920 Summer Olympics.

Larsson was nicknamed "Padd-Anders" for his large, paddle-like palms. He worked as a restaurant janitor and bouncer and consulted police forces on self-defense techniques. At the 1920 Olympics, he rescued Köre Sörvik, a member of the Norwegian Olympic team, by stopping a man who tried to stab Sörvik with a knife in a dance club brawl.
