= Martti Nieminen =

Finnish wrestler (1891–1963)

Personal information
- Born: 9 October 1891 Salo, Finland
- Died: 24 April 1963 (aged 71) Jyväskylä, Finland
Medal record
Men's Greco-Roman wrestling
Representing Finland
Olympic Games
Bronze medal – third place	1920 Antwerp	Heavyweight

Kaarlo Martti Nieminen (9 October 1891 – 24 April 1963) was a Finnish wrestler who competed in the 1920 Summer Olympics. He was born in Salo and died in Jyväskylä.

In 1920 he won the bronze medal in the Greco-Roman heavyweight competition after winning the final of the bronze medal round against Alexander Weyand.
