= Väinö Penttala =

Finnish wrestler (1897–1976)

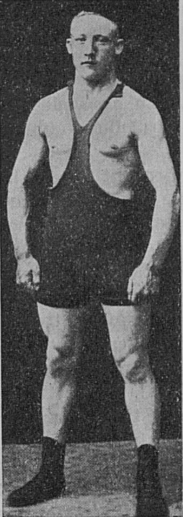
- Born: 16 January 1897; Isokyrö, Finland
- Died: 28 February 1976 (aged 79); Isokyrö, Finland

Väinö Penttala
Medal record

Men's freestyle wrestling

Representing Finland

Olympic Games
Silver medal – second place	1920 Antwerp	Middleweight

Väinö Verner Penttala (16 January 1897 – 28 February 1976) was a Finnish wrestler and Olympic medalist. He won a silver medal in freestyle wrestling at the 1920 Summer Olympics in Antwerp. In 1923 the first freestyle wrestling tournaments took place in Finland. Penttala won the title four times (until 1927).,
