= Walter Maurer (wrestler) =

American wrestler

Personal information
- Born: May 9, 1893 Kenosha, Wisconsin, U.S.
- Died: May 18, 1983 (aged 90) Chicago, Illinois, U.S.

Sport
- Country: United States
- Sport: Wrestling
- Event: Freestyle
- Club: Chicago Hebrew Institute
- Team: USA
Medal record
Men's freestyle wrestling
Representing the United States
Olympic Games
Bronze medal – third place	1920 Antwerp	82.5 kg

Walter Stark Maurer (May 9, 1893 – May 18, 1983) was an American wrestler who competed in the 1920 Summer Olympics. He was born in Kenosha, Wisconsin and died in Chicago. In 1920, he won the bronze medal in the freestyle wrestling light-heavyweight class after winning the bronze medal match against John Redman.
