= Edward Willkie =

American wrestler

Edward Everett Willkie
- Born: December 25, 1896; Elwood, Indiana, U.S.
- Died: October 15, 1956 (aged 59); Bellingham, Washington, U.S.

Edward Everett Willkie (December 25, 1896 – October 15, 1956) was an American wrestler. He competed in the Greco-Roman heavyweight event at the 1920 Summer Olympics. He was the brother of Wendell Willkie.
