= Matti Perttilä =

Finnish wrestler (1896–1968)

- Born: 21 January 1896; Isokyrö, Finland
- Died: 12 May 1968 (aged 72); Isokyrö, Finland
Medal record
Men's Greco-Roman wrestling
Representing Finland
Olympic Games
Bronze medal – third place	1920 Antwerp	Middleweight

Matti Rudolf "Masa" Perttilä (21 January 1896 – 12 May 1968) was a Finnish wrestler who competed in the 1920 Summer Olympics. He was born and died in Isokyrö.

In 1920 he won the bronze medal in the Greco-Roman middleweight competition after winning the final of the bronze medal round against Sjur Johnsen.
