= William Wilson (wrestler) =

British wrestler (1887–1955)

- Born: 7 October 1887; Finsbury Park, England
- Died: 14 May 1955 (aged 67); Southgate, London, England

William George Wilson (7 October 1887 – 14 May 1955) was a British wrestler. He competed at the 1920 and 1924 Summer Olympics.
