= August Thys =

Belgian wrestler (1895–1959)

- Born: 15 November 1895; Antwerp, Belgium
- Died: 11 September 1959 (aged 63); Wijnegem, Belgium

August Thys (15 November 1895 – 11 September 1959) was a Belgian wrestler. He competed at the 1920 and 1924 Summer Olympics.
