= Charles Frisenfeldt =

Danish wrestler (1889–1976)

- Born: 9 October 1889; Gentofte, Denmark
- Died: 17 April 1976 (aged 86); Gentofte, Denmark

Frants Gerhardt Charles William Frisenfeldt (9 October 1889 – 17 April 1976) was a Danish wrestler. He competed at the 1920 and 1924 Summer Olympics.
