= Gottfrid Svensson =

Swedish wrestler (1889–1956)

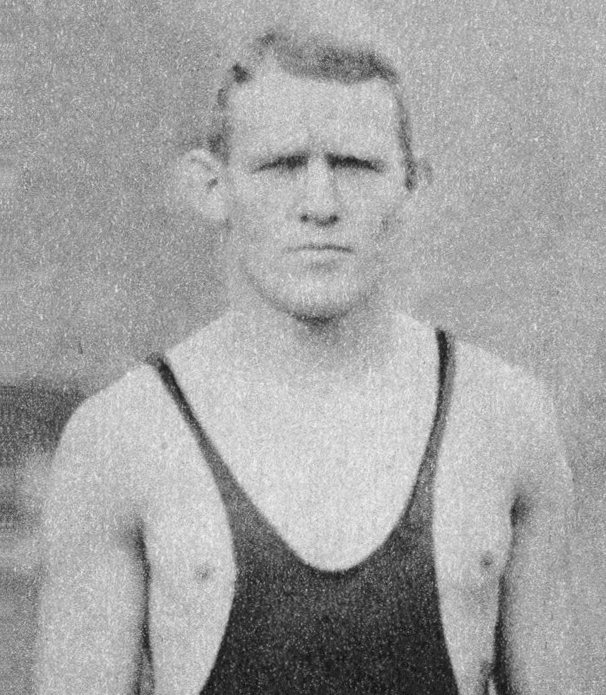

Personal information
- Born: 13 May 1889 Uppsala, Sweden
- Died: 19 August 1956 (aged 67) Stockholm, Sweden

Sport
- Sport: Freestyle wrestling
- Club: Djurgårdens IF, Stockholm
Medal record
Men's freestyle wrestling
Representing Sweden
Olympic Games
Silver medal – second place	1920 Antwerp	Lightweight

Gottfrid Cervantius Svensson (13 May 1889 – 19 August 1956) was a Swedish wrestler. He competed in Greco-Roman and freestyle wrestling at the 1912 and 1920 Summer Olympics. He won the silver medal in the freestyle lightweight contest in 1920. Earlier in 1913, he won a silver medal at the unofficial European Championships.

Svensson represented Djurgårdens IF.
