= Eduard Pütsep =

Estonian wrestler (1898–1960)

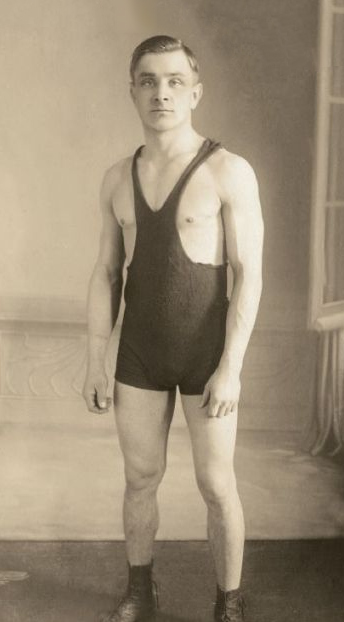

Personal information
- Born: 21 October 1898 Vastseliina Parish, Kreis Werro, Governorate of Estonia
- Died: 22 August 1960 (aged 61) Kuusamo, Finland

Sport
- Sport: Greco-Roman wrestling
- Club: Kalev Tallinn
Medal record
Men's freestyle wrestling
Representing Estonia
Olympic Games
Gold medal – first place	1924 Paris	58 kg
World Championships
Silver medal – second place	1922 Stockholm	58 kg
European Championships
Silver medal – second place	1927 Budapest	58 kg

Eduard Pütsep (21 October 1898 – 22 August 1960) was an Estonian wrestler. He competed in Greco-Roman wrestling in the 1920, 1924 and 1928 Olympics and won a gold medal in the bantamweight division in 1924, becoming the first Olympic champion in wrestling from Estonia. In 1928 he placed sixth in Greco-Roman and ninth in freestyle wrestling.

== Career ==
Eduard Pütsep was born in Vastseliina Parish (present-day Võru Parish). He took up wrestling during World War I and in 1917 placed third at the Russian championships. At his first international competition, the 1920 Olympics, he lost in a semifinal to the eventual silver medalist Heikki Kähkönen. Next year he finished fourth at the world championships, and in 1922 won a silver medal. He retired from competitions in 1933 and attended the 1936 Summer Olympics as the head coach of the Latvian wrestling team. During World War II he moved to Finland and continued to coach wrestlers there. Since 1977 an annual international wrestling tournament in his honor has been held in Võru, Estonia.

Pütsep could communicate in eight languages. Yet during his wrestling years he acted in silent films, and was nicknamed "Estonian Chaplin". In 1924, he starred in Õnnelik korterikriisi lahendus, directed by Konstantin Märska, and in 1925 played in Tšeka komissar Miroštšenko.
