= Edmond Dame =

French wrestler (1893–1956)

- Born: 4 November 1893; Rouvroy, Pas-de-Calais, France
- Died: 31 August 1956 (aged 62); Paris, France

Edmond Dame
Medal record

Men's freestyle wrestling

Representing France

Olympic Games
Bronze medal – third place	1928 Amsterdam	Heavyweight

Edmond Dame (4 November 1893 – 31 August 1956) was a French wrestler. He was born in Rouvroy in Pas-de-Calais. He was Olympic bronze medalist in Freestyle wrestling in 1928, and also competed at the 1920 and 1924 Olympics.
