= Heikki Kähkönen =

Finnish wrestler (1891–1962)

Personal information
- Born: 26 December 1891 Rääkkylä, Finland
- Died: 30 June 1962 (aged 70) Imatra, Finland
Medal record
Men's Greco-Roman wrestling
Representing Finland
Olympic Games
| Silver medal – second place | 1920 Antwerp | Featherweight |

Heikki Kähkönen (26 December 1891 – 30 June 1962) was a Finnish wrestler and Olympic medalist in Greco-Roman wrestling. Kähkönen competed at the 1920 Summer Olympics in Antwerp where he received a silver medal in Greco-Roman wrestling, the featherweight class.
