= Frits Janssens =

Belgian wrestler

- Born: 14 March 1892; Berchem, Belgium
- Died: 30 March 1965 (aged 73); Schoten, Belgium

Frits Janssens (14 March 1892 – 30 March 1965) was a Belgian wrestler who competed at the 1920, 1924 and 1928 Summer Olympics.
