= Emil Väre =

Finnish wrestler (1885–1974)

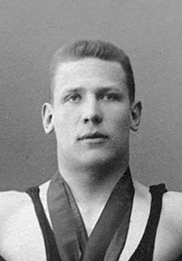
- Väre at the 1912 Olympics

Personal information
- Born: Emil Ernst Väre; 28 September 1885 Kärkölä, Grand duchy of Finland
- Died: 31 January 1974 (aged 88) Kärkölä, Finland

Sport
- Sport: Greco-Roman wrestling
- Club: Viipurin Voimailijat, Vyborg
Medal record
Men's Greco-Roman wrestling
Representing Finland
Olympic Games
Gold medal – first place	1912 Stockholm	Lightweight
Gold medal – first place	1920 Antwerp	Lightweight
World Championships
Gold medal – first place	1911 Helsinki	73 kg

Emil Ernst Väre (28 September 1885 – 31 January 1974) was a Finnish wrestler who won the gold medals in the lightweight class at the 1912 and 1920 Summer Olympics.

Väre held the 1911 World title, the 1912 unofficial European title, and the 1909 and 1911 national titles. Between 1912 and 1916, he won all of his wrestling bouts. He retired after the 1920 Olympics to become a wrestling referee and coach. In the 1920s, he acted as president, general secretary, treasurer, and vice-president of his wrestling club Viipurin Voimailijat and was a board member of the Finnish Wrestling Federation.
