= 43rd Locarno Film Festival =

Film festival in Locarno, Switzerland

- Location: Locarno, Switzerland
- Founded: 1946
- Awards: Golden Leopard: Accidental Waltz directed by Svetlana Proskurina
- Artistic director: David Strieff
- Festival date: Opening: 2 August 1990; Closing: 12 August 1990
- Website: LFF

Locarno Film Festival
- 44th 42nd

The 43rd Locarno Film Festival was held from 2 to 12 August 1990 in Locarno, Switzerland. The festival had 112,000 people attend, of which 70,000 people attended screenings at the Piazza grande, the open-air theater constructed in the town center. Wild at Heart directed by David Lynch drew a record crowd of 10,500 people. The festival hosted a section of Eastern European films banned by their governments the 1960s. Two banned films premiered for the first time at the festival, Born in '45 directed by Jürgen Böttcher and Egon Günther's Wenn Du Gross Bist, Lieber Adam (When You Are Grown Up, Dear Adam). Over half the films at Locarno this year were from Eastern Europe. A retrospective of pioneering Russian filmmaker Lev Kuleshov, was also shown that included 34 out of his total 50 films.

The Golden Leopard, the festival's top prize, was awarded to Accidental Waltz directed by Svetlana Proskurina.

== Jury ==
=== International Jury – Main Competition ===
- Nastassja Kinski, German actress
- Michel Ciment, French critic
- Werner Duggelin, Swiss director
- Grytzko Mascioni, Swiss writer
- Nanni Moretti, Italian director
- Mrinal Sen, Indian director
- Alexander Sokurov, Russian director

== Official Sections ==
The following films were screened in these sections:

=== Competition ===
Feature Films

Original Title	English Title	Director(s)	Year	Production Country
Alicinte Anweshanam		T. V. Chandran	1989	India
Badis		Mohamed Abderrahman Taz	1988	Morocco
Dao Wen	The Story of a Gangster	Hung-Wei Yeh	1989	Taiwan
Henry: Portrait Of A Serial Killer		John McNaughton	1985	USA
Hush-A-Bye Baby		Margo Harkin	1989	Iceland
Konechnaya Ostanovka	The Final Stop	Serik Aprimov	1989	Russia
L'Aria Serena Dell'Ovest	The Peaceful Air of the West	Silvio Soldini	1990	Switzerland, Italy
L'Homme Imagine	A Man Imagines	Patricia Barton	1989	France
La Capatul Liniei	At the End of the Line	Dinu Tanase	1983	Romania
La Sposa Di San Paolo	The Bride of San Paolo	Gabriella Rosaleva	1990	Italy
Leb Wohl, Joseph	Farewell, Joseph	Andreas Kleinert	1989	Germany
Leningrad, November		Andreas Schmidt	1990	Germany, Russia
Metropolitan		Whit Stillman	1990	USA
Reise Der Hoffnung	Journey of Hope	Xavier Koller	1990	Switzerland, Italy
Slouchainij Vals	Accidental Waltz	Svetlana Proskurina	1989	Russia
Szürkület	Twilight	György Fehér	1990	Hungary
The Reflecting Skin		Philip Ridley	1990	Great Britain
Zeit Der Rache	Time of Revenge	Anton Peschke	1990	Austria

=== Out of Competition ===
Feature Films

Original Title	English Title	Director(s)	Year	Production Country
A Ay	Oh Moon!	Reha Erdem	1989	Turkey
Angels		Jacob Berger	1989	Switzerland, Spain
Boda Secreta	Secret Wedding	Alejandro Agresti	1989	Argentina, Netherlands
Daddy Nostalgie		Bertrand Tavernier	1990	France
Homo Novus	A New Man	Pál Erdőss	1990	Russia
Il Sole Anche Di Notte	The Sun Even at Night	Vittorio Taviani, Paolo Taviani	1990	Italy
Ju Dou	Judo U	Zhang Yimon	1989	China
Karaul	Guard	Alexandr Rogozhkin	1989	Russia
Kindergarten		Jorge Polaco	1989	Argentina
La Nacion Clandestina	The Clandestine Nation	Jorge Sanjinés	1989	Bolivia
Nama-Ye Nazdik	Nama-Nadik	Abbas Kiarostami	1990	Iran
Nouvelle Vague	New Wave	Jean-Luc Godard	1990	Switzerland, France
Pink Ulysses		Eric de Kuyper	1990	Netherlands
Porte Aperte	Open Doors	Gianni Amelio	1990	Italy
Ser (Svoboda Eto Rai)	Sir (Freedom Here is Paradise)	Sergueï Bodrov	1989	Russia
Spasi I Sokrani	Save and Socran	Aleksandr Sokurov	1989	Russia
The Comfort Of Strangers		Paul Schrader	1990	USA
Tilaï		Idrissa Ouédraogo	1990	Burkina Faso
Wild At Heart		David Lynch	1989	USA
À La Recherche Du Lieu De Ma Naissance	In Search of the Place of My Birth	Boris Lehman	1990	Belgium, Switzerland

=== Special Sessions ===
Original Title	English Title	Director(s)	Year	Production Country
Al Gatun		Kali Kali	1990	Switzerland
L'Atalante		Jean Vigo	1934	France
Meghe Dhaka Tara		Ritwik Ghatak	1960	India
Titash Ekti Nadir Naam	A River Called Titas	Ritwik Ghatak	1973	Bangladesh

=== Tribute To – Cesare Zavattini ===
Tribute To Cesare Zavattini
Original Title	English Title	Director(s)	Year	Production Country
Il Giudizio Universale	The Universal Judgment	Vittorio De Sica	1961	Italy
La Veritàaa	The Truth	Cesare Zavattini	1982	Italy
Parliamo Di Te	Let's Talk About you	Fabio Carpi Carpi	1968	Italy
Storia Di Caterina	History of Caterina	Francesco Maselli, Cesare Zavattini	1953	Italy
Zavattini Regista, Zavattini Sceneggiatore	Zavattini Director, Zavattini Screenwriter	Luigi Di Gianni	1989	Italy

=== Banned Films From the 60s ===
Original Title	English Title	Director(s)	Year	Production Country
Das Kaninchen Bin Ich	I Am the Rabbit	Kurt Maetzig	1965	Germany
Dolgada Scastivaja Zhizn	Dolgada is a Happiness Life	Gennady Shpalikov	1966	Russia
Jahrgang 45	Born in '45	Jürgen Böttcher	1965	Germany
Meandre	Meander	Mircea Saucan	1966	Romania
O Slavnosti A Hostech	About the Festivities and Guests	Jan Nemec	1968	Czech Republic
Ponedelnik Sutrin	Monday Morning	Irina Aktascheva, Christo Piskov		Bulgaria
Skrivanci Na Nitich	The Hidden on Nihich	Jiri Menzel	1969	Czech Republic
Spur Der Steine	Trade of the Stones	Frank Beyer	1966	Germany
Vsichni Dobri Rodaci	All Good Rods	Vojtěch Jasný	1968	Czech Republic
Wenn Du Gross Bist, Lieber Adam	When You Are Grown Up, Dear Adam	Egon Günther	1965	Germany
Zastava Ilica	Flag Ilica	Marlen Khutziev	1964	Russia

=== Retrospective – Lev Kuleshov ===
Original Title	English Title	Director(s)	Year	Production Country
Albidum	White	Leonid Obolenskij	1929	Russia
Chakhmantnaïa		Vsevolod Poudovkine	1925	Russia
Delo Zastiojkami	Work	Alexandra Khokhlova	1929	Russia
Dva-Bouldi-Dva	Two-Bouldi-Two	Lev Kuleshov	1929	Russia
Gorizont	Horizon	Lev Kuleshov	1933	Russia
Iounye Partizany	Yuna Partisans	Lev Kuleshov	1943	Russia
Journalistka	Journalist	Lev Kuleshov	1927	Russia
Kirptchiki	Equipment RPT Chiki	Leonid Obolenskij	1925	Russia
Kliatva Timoura	Cliaba Timoura	Lev Kuleshov	1942	Russia
Korol' Parija	Korol 'Parija	Evgueni Bauer	1917	Russia
Koukla S Millionami	A Doll with Millions	Sergueï Komarov	1928	Russia
Liedolom	Ladolome	Boris Barnet	1931	Russia
Loutch Smerti	Ray of Death	Lev Kuleshov	1925	Russia
Mekhanika Golovnogo Mozga	Brain Mechanics	Vsevolod Poudovkine	1926	Russia
Miss Mary		Boris Tchaïkovski	1918	Russia
Moskva V Oktiabre	Moscow in Oktiabre	Boris Barnet	1927	Russia
My S Ourala		Lev Kuleshov	1943	Russia
Nabat		Evgueni Bauer	1917	Russia
Neobytchaïnye Priklioutchénia Mistera Vesta V Strane Bolchevikov	Neobytcharnye Priklioutchenia Mister Vest in the Party Bolchevikov	Lev Kuleshov	1924	Russia
Po Zakonou	After the Law	Lev Kuleshov	1926	Russia
Potselouï Meri Pikford	Potselouï Sea Pikford	Sergueï Komarov	1927	Russia
Proekt Injeniera Praïta	Proekt Injeeniera Praota	Lev Kuleshov	1918	Russia
Sacha		Alexandra Khokhlova	1930	Russia
Serp I Molot	Serp I Move	Vladimir Gardine	1921	Russia
Sibiriaki	Silemari	Lev Kuleshov	1940	Russia
Sloutchaï Na Voulkanie	Sloutcharis for a Bullshit	Evgueni Schneider	1940	Russia
Smeltchak		Mikhaïl Narokov	1919	Russia
Son Tarassa	I'm Tarassa	Iouri Jeliaboujski	1919	Russia
Sorok Serdets	Forty Hearts	Lev Kuleshov	1930	Russia
Steklianny Glaz	Glass Eyes	Lili Brik	1929	Russia
Torgovstsy Slavoï		Leonid Obolenskij	1929	Russia
Velki Outiechitel'	Veil	Lev Kuleshov	1933	Russia
Vessiolaïa Kanareïka	Vessiolaïa Canareïka	Lev Kuleshov	1929	Russia
Za Stchastiem	For Stagnant	Evgueni Bauer	1917	Russia
Znakomoe Litso	A Familiar Face	Nikolaï Chpikovski	1929	Russia

=== A Look At Italian Cinema ===
Original Title	English Title	Director(s)	Year	Production Country
Il Gioco Delle Ombre	The Game of Shadows	Stefano Gabrini	1990	Italy
Les Cinque Rose Di Jennifer	The Cinque Rose Di Jennifer	Tommaso Sherman	1989	Italy
Lungo Il Fiume	Along the River	Vanna Paoli	1990	Italy
Roma, Paris, Barcelona	Rome, Paris, Barcelona	Paolo Grassini, Italo Spinelli	1989	Italy
Turné	On Tour	Gabriele Salvatores	1990	Italy

=== Out of Program ===
Original Title	English Title	Director(s)	Production Country
Joseph Czapski		Emanuel Kowalski	Switzerland

== Independent Sections ==
=== Critics Week ===
The Semaine de la Critique is an independent section, created in 1990 by the Swiss Association of Film Journalists in partnership with the Locarno Film Festival.

Original Title	English Title	Director(s)	Year	Production Country
Contretemps	Setback	Jean-Daniel Pollet	1988	France
Der Grüne Berg	The Green Mountain	Fredi M. Murer	1990	Switzerland
Good News - Von Kolporteuren, Toten Hunden Und Anderen Wienern	Good News - From Kolporte, Dead Dogs and Other Viennese	Ulrich Seidl	1989	Austria
Lung-Ta		Franz-Christoph Giercke, Marie Jaoul de Poncheville	1990	France
Nachid El-Hajar	We Commend the Stone	Michel Khleifi	1990	Belgium
The Thin Blue Line		Errol Morris	1988	USA

=== Swiss Information ===
New Swiss Feature Films
Original Title	English Title	Director(s)	Year	Production Country
Bingo		Markus Imboden	1990	Switzerland
Grimsel - Ein Augenschein	Grimsel - An Inspection	Peter Liechti	1990	Switzerland
L'Assassina	The Assassin	Beat Kuert	1990	Switzerland
La Femme De Rose Hill	Rose Hill's Wife	Alain Tanner	1989	Switzerland, France
Leo Sonnyboy		Rolf Lyssy	1989	Switzerland
Lynx		Franz Reichle	1990	Switzerland
Step Across The Border		Nicolas Humbert, Werner Penzel	1989	Switzerland, Germany
Stille Betrüger	Silent Fraudsters	Beat Lottaz	1989	Switzerland, Germany
Touchol	Touch	Alvaro Bizzarri	1990	Switzerland
New Swiss Short Films
Original Title	English Title	Director(s)	Year	Production Country
Alois Camenzind Klauenschneider		Bernard Weber	1989	Switzerland
Encore Une Histoire D'Amour	Another Love Story	Pierre-Yves Borgeaud	1989	Switzerland
L'Autre	The Other	Juliette Frey	1990	Belgium
La Mano Senza Volto	The Faceless Hand	Adriano Kestenholz	1989	Switzerland
Le Decoupage		Tobias Ineichen	1989	Switzerland
Syndrom	Syndrome	Jörg Bühlmann	1989	Poland
À Tire-Coeur	Firing	Marie-Luce Felber	1990	Switzerland

== Official Awards ==
=== Official Jury ===
- Golden Leopard: Accidental Waltz directed by Svetlana Proskurina
- Silver Leopard: The Reflecting Skin directed by Philip Ridley, Metropolitan directed by Whit Stillman
- Bronze Leopard: Journey of Hope directed by Xavier Koller, to Miklos Gurban cinematographer for Szürkület directed by György Fehér
- Bronze Leopard (Best Actor or Actress): Emer McCourt in Hush-A-Bye Baby directed by Margo Harkin
