= Gabe Davies =

British big-wave surfer

Personal information
- Born: Gabriel Davies Newcastle, England

Surfing career
- Sport: Surfing
- Sponsors: Patagonia
- Major achievements: H3O Surfstock ‘biggest wave of the year’ award 2008; 4-time British surfing Champion; XXL big wave nominee 2009; La Vaca Gigante III big wave winner 2010 wave of the day award winner Billabong/Monster Mullaghmore tow-in event 2011.

Gabriel 'Gabe' Davies is a British big-wave surfer.

== Surf career ==
Davies is a four-time British surfing champion and big wave surfer from Newcastle, UK. He has appeared in award-winning surfing documentaries such as Joel Conroy's Eye of the Storm in 2002 and in 2009 he co-lead with Richie Fitzgerald in Joel Conroy's first featured documentary, Waveriders. Together they tow surfed the biggest swell ever ridden off the Irish Atlantic Coast for which Davies was nominated for a worldwide XXL big wave award. Davies has appeared in numerous television and film productions including presenting Channel 4's 'Surf Trip' with Tess Daly and BBC 2's Teenage Video Diaries On 16 November 2009 he won 'Best Surfer' at The Quiksilver ‘La Vaca Gigante III’ Big Wave Invitational Event In February 2011, he won the Wave of the Day Award at Ireland's inaugural big wave invitational event. He currently resides in the North East of England, and is married to author and screenwriter Lauren Davies
