= It Happened in Broad Daylight =

1958 film by Ladislao Vajda written by Friedrich Dürrenmatt

Es geschah am hellichten Tag - El cebo
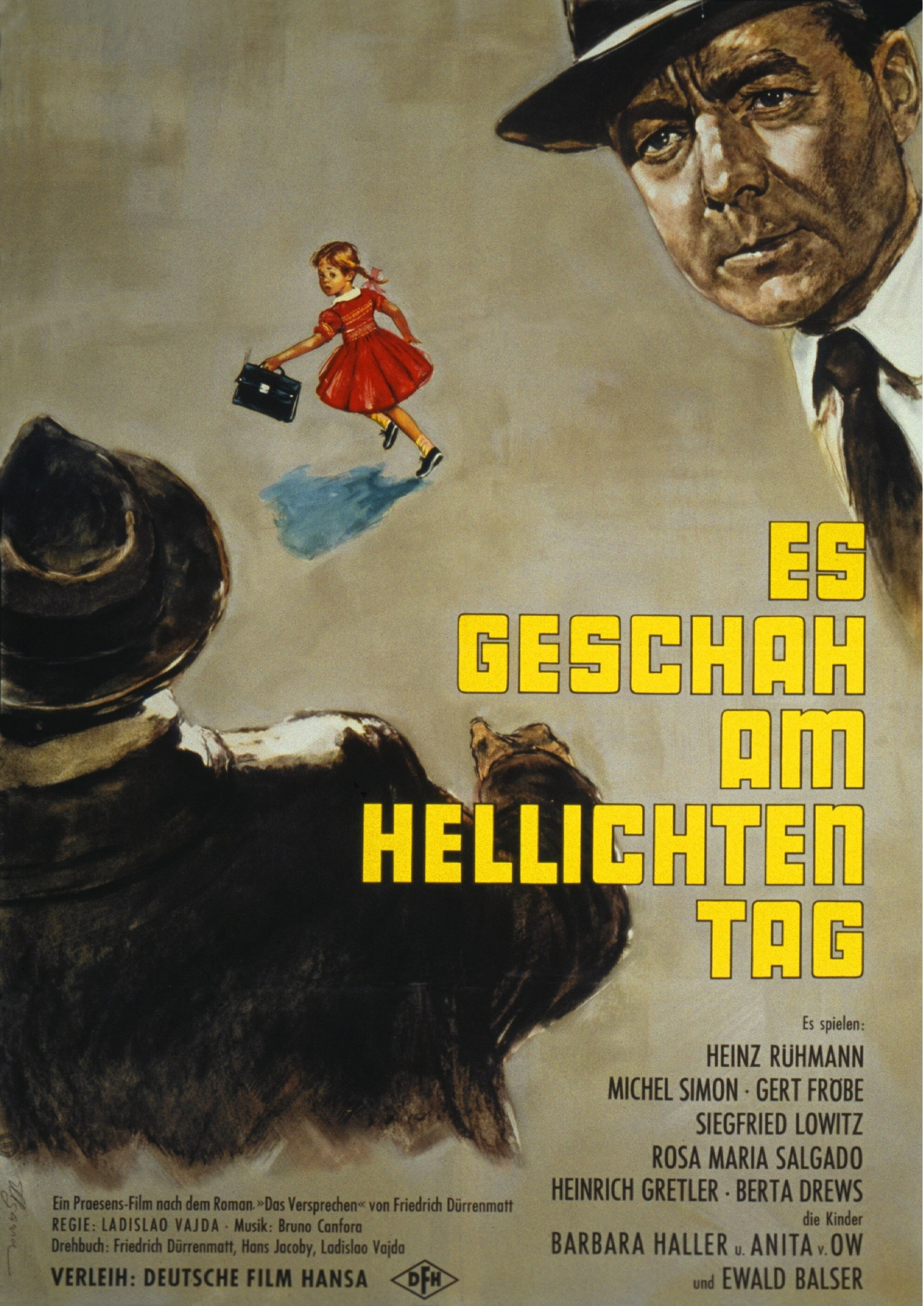
- Directed by: Ladislao Vajda
- Written by: Friedrich Dürrenmatt; Hans Jacoby; Ladislao Vajda
- Produced by: Lazar Wechsler; Artur Brauner (co-producer)
- Starring: Heinz Rühmann; Siegfried Lowitz; Michel Simon; Gert Fröbe
- Cinematography: Ernst Bolliger; Heinrich Gärtner
- Music by: Bruno Canfora
- Production companies: Praesens-Film; CCC-Film; Chamartín Producciones
- Distributed by: Deutsche Film Hansa
- Release date: 1958
- Running time: 95 minutes
- Countries: Switzerland; West Germany; Spain
- Language: German

Es geschah am hellichten Tag (English: It Happened in Broad Daylight) is a 1958 German-language thriller film directed by Ladislao Vajda. The original screenplay was written by Friedrich Dürrenmatt, a Swiss playwright and novelist, and this first instance of the film is still acclaimed by critics.

== Plot ==
Matthäi, a senior detective with the Zürich police, is about to take up a post in the Middle East when a call comes in that a peddler has found the body of a little girl in the woods. With the peddler he inspects the site and, when none of the other police volunteer, says he will tell the parents. Distraught, the mother asks him to swear that he will find the killer.

He goes to the little girls' school, where another child points out a picture the dead girl had drawn. It shows a tall man in a long black coat, a large black car, a little girl, a horned creature, and some black hedgehogs. The villagers think the peddler was the murderer, as does Matthäi's successor who, after a long hard interrogation, gets a confession. That night the peddler hangs himself in his cell.

The police consider the case closed. Matthäi, however, believes the peddler was innocent and that the culprit is a serial killer who has murdered two other little girls and may strike again. As he takes his seat in the airliner, the man next to him is eating chocolate truffles which look just like the hedgehogs in the drawing. Realising that the killer may have befriended the little girl with chocolates, he abandons his trip. When his successor dismisses his theory, Matthäi decides to solve the case on his own. A psychiatrist friend suggests that the drawing is true. Such a killer is intimidated by grown women, and gets his revenge by murdering little girls. He must be childless himself.

Plotting the three murder sites on the map, Matthäi sees that they were all beside the main highway from Zürich to Chur. The heraldic animal of Chur is the horned chamois, which appears on its vehicle number plates. He rents a filling station on the road, where he takes the numbers of cars from Chur, traces their owners, and under various pretexts rings up to find out if they have children. Seeing a lonely little girl in the village, he befriends her, learning that her name is Annemarie and that her mother is alone and unmarried. He invites mother and daughter to live in the filling station and encourages the child to play beside the road.

Driving from Chur to Zürich in his large black car, a businessman named Schrott sees Annemarie playing and stops at the filling station, though his tank is nearly full. Matthäi finds out his home number, where his wife says that her two sons are out in the world. A few days later, Schrott hides his car in the woods and in his long black coat entices Annemarie with a glove puppet. He tells her nobody must know of their encounter.

When Annemarie is late back from school one day, Matthäi sees chocolate stains on her hands and finds hedgehog truffles in her pocket. He orders the mother to take the child somewhere safe and, buying a shop window dummy, dresses it in Annemarie's clothes. Laying his bait in the woods, he alerts the local police and they keep watch for the killer.

Schrott, who is only the stepfather of his wife's sons, has a row with her and drives off with murder in mind. Thinking the dummy is a dead Annemarie, he screams in terror. When Matthäi approaches, Schrott attacks and wounds him, but is felled by a shot from the police.

== Cast ==
- Heinz Rühmann as Oberleutnant Matthäi
- Sigfrit Steiner as Detektiv Feller
- Siegfried Lowitz as Leutnant Heinzi
- Michel Simon as Jacquier
- Heinrich Gretler as Polizeikommandant [Chief of Police]
- Gert Fröbe as Herr Schrott
- Berta Drews as Frau Schrott
- Ewald Balser as Professor Manz (voiced in English version by Roger Livesey)
- María Rosa Salgado as Frau Heller
- Anita von Ow as Annemarie Heller, her daughter
- Barbara Haller as Ursula Fehlmann
- Emil Hegetschweiler as Gemeindepräsident [town mayor]
- Ettore Cella as Tankstellenbesitzer [Gas station owner]

== Production ==
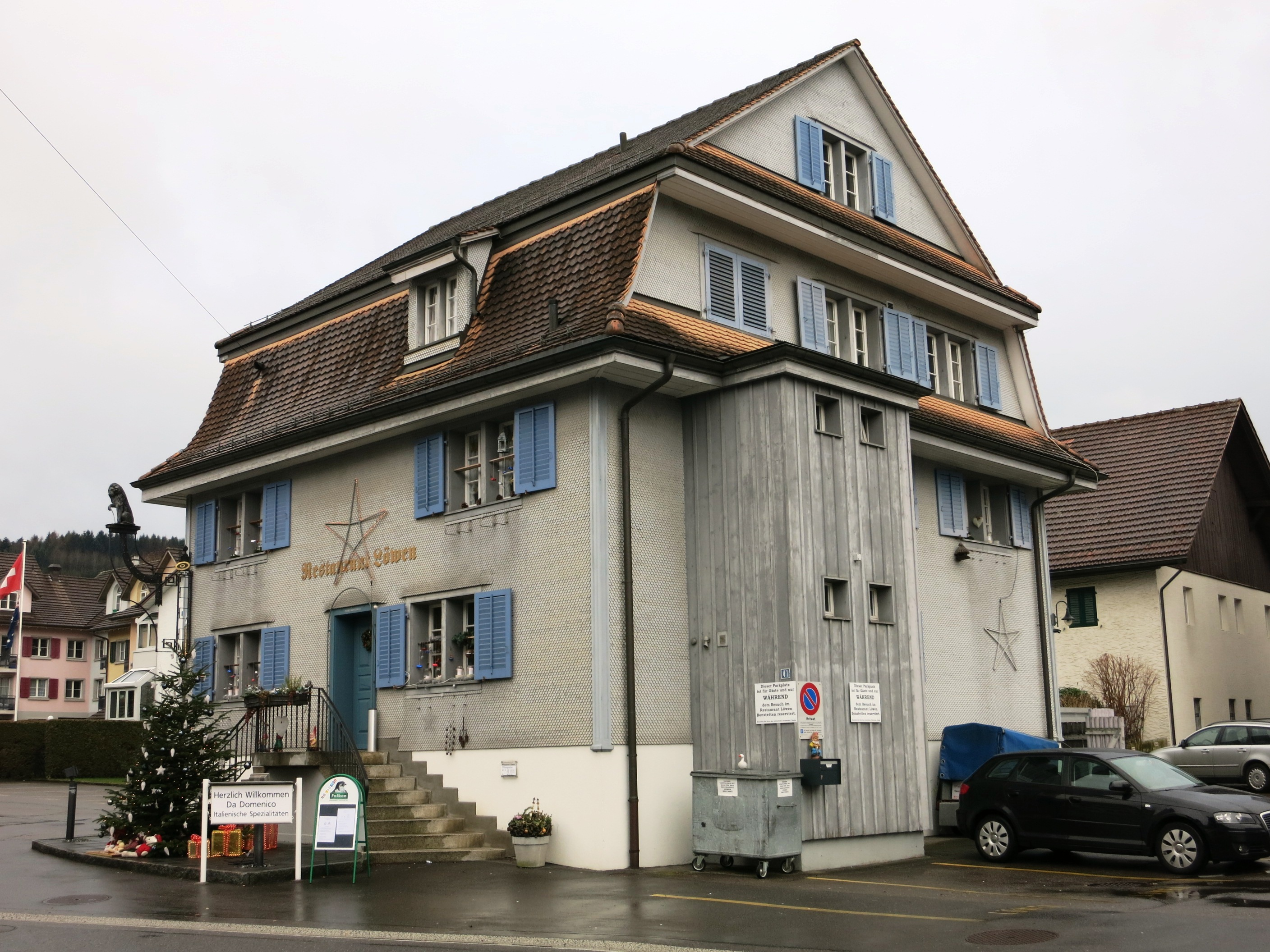
The inn featured in the film, Gasthaus zum Löwen in Bonstetten, photographed in 2014

Filming took place from 22 February to April 1958 near Zürich and Chur. Interiors were shot at Praesens-Film Atelier and the Spandau Studios in West Berlin.

== Release ==
The film premiered on 4 July 1958 at the IFF/Berlin. It went on general release on 9 July 1958. In Switzerland it premiered on 12 July 1958 (Rex, Zürich).

== Awards ==
The film was nominated for the Golden Bear at the Berlin International Film Festival.

== Adaptations ==
=== Remakes ===
- In 1979, an Italian remake, directed by Alberto Negrin, under the title La promessa was released.
- In 1990, a Hungarian remake, directed by György Fehér, under the title Szürkület was released.
- In 1995, a Dutch remake, directed by Rudolf Van Den Berg, under the title The Cold Light of Day was released.
- In 1997, a German TV film remake, directed by Nico Hofmann, under the original title Es geschah am hellichten Tag was released.
- In 2001, an American remake, directed by Sean Penn, under the title The Pledge was released.
- In 2018, a Tamil partial adaptation, directed by Ram kumar, under the title Ratsasan was released.
- In 2019, a Telugu remake of the above-mentioned movie Ratsasan, directed by Ramesh Varma, under the title Rakshasudu was released.

=== Alternative versions ===
Friedrich Dürrenmatt was not happy to see the detective proven successful at the end the story, so he wrote the novel Das Versprechen: Requiem auf den Kriminalroman (The Pledge: Requiem for the Detective Novel) from the existing film script. Das Versprechen differs from Es geschah am hellichten Tag by having the detective fail to identify the killer in the end because of the murderer's death in a car accident. This failure ultimately leaves the detective a broken and witless old man.

American director Sean Penn made a fifth movie on the same theme, named The Pledge in 2001, starring Jack Nicholson and Helen Mirren. Penn's movie incorporates Das Versprechen's darker ending, as preferred by Dürrenmatt.
