= Richie Fitzgerald =

Irish big-wave surfer

Personal information
- Born: Richard Fitzgerald County Donegal, Ireland
- Height: 5’10’’ (178cm)
- Weight: 168lb (76kg)
- Website: www.surfworld.ie

Surfing career
- Sport: Surfing
- Sponsors: Volkswagen, Billabong, MMD, C-Skins, Vans, Northcore
- Major achievements: Semi Finalist in Eurosurf Masters event 2011

Surfing specifications
- Stance: Goofy
- Shaper: Mark McGuire (Power Source Surf Boards)
- Favourite waves: The Peak, Bundoran

Richie Fitzgerald is an Irish big-wave surfer.

He first appeared as a judge in Channel 4's reality TV show, Faking it, titled "Web Surfer To Wave Surfer", which aired on 2 November 2002. He then appeared in surfing documentaries such as Joel Conroy's Eye of the Storm in 2002 and Step Into Liquid in 2003. In 2009 he co-lead with Gabe Davies in Joel Conroy's first featured documentary, Waveriders. Together they tow surfed the biggest swell to have been ridden off the Irish Atlantic Coast. In 2014, he appeared in a Jägermeister advert called "Journey to Surf" alongside Ben Skinner. He currently runs the surf coaching academy and Surf World shop in Bundoran with his Australian wife Briohny.

== See also ==
- On the road with Richie Fitzgerald
- Swell Times - Surf Boot Camp by Deirdre Mullins
