= 2014 FA WSL Cup =

Tournament details
- Country: England
- Dates: 30 April 2014 – 16 October 2014
- Teams: 18

Final positions
- Champions: Manchester City
- Runners-up: Arsenal

Tournament statistics
- Matches played: 47
- Goals scored: 164 (3.49 per match)
- Attendance: 23,569 (501 per match)
- Top goal scorer: (England) Natasha Dowie Liverpool (England) Jessica Clarke Notts County (8 Goals Each)

The 2014 FA WSL Cup was the fourth edition of the FA WSL's league cup competition. It was sponsored by Continental AG, who sponsored the competition from its creation, and was officially known as the FA WSL Continental Tyres Cup. All 18 teams of the two divisions of the WSL took part in the competition.

Arsenal were the defending champions and the only club to have won the cup in the previous three seasons it was contested in.

The 2014 edition saw 18 teams play for the title. Teams were divided into three groups of six. The group winners plus the best runners-up advanced to the semi-finals. The first matches were played on 30 April 2014.

== Group stage ==
=== Group 1 ===
Arsenal advanced as best runners-up, having more points than the other second placed teams.

| Pos | Team | Pld | W | D | L | GF | GA | GD | Pts | Qualification | CHE | ARS | WAT | MIL | REA | LON |
|---|---|---|---|---|---|---|---|---|---|---|---|---|---|---|---|---|
| 1 | Chelsea | 5 | 4 | 0 | 1 | 22 | 5 | +17 | 12 | Advance to knock-out stage | — | — | — | 2–0 | — | 13–0 |
| 2 | Arsenal | 5 | 4 | 0 | 1 | 17 | 2 | +15 | 12 | Advance to knock-out stage | 3–0 | — | 3–0 | — | — | 7–0 |
| 3 | Watford | 5 | 2 | 0 | 3 | 5 | 11 | −6 | 6 | | 1–2 | — | — | 1–5 | — | — |
| 4 | Millwall Lionesses | 5 | 1 | 2 | 2 | 3 | 8 | −5 | 5 | | — | 0–4 | — | — | 1–1 | — |
| 5 | Reading (Note: Reading had three points deducted due to fielding a cup-tied player in the win against London Bees.) | 5 | 2 | 1 | 2 | 12 | 4 | +8 | 4 | | 1–2 | 2–0 | AWD (Note: Awarded win for Watford. Fixture was not played as Reading were removed from the Cup after fielding a cup-tied player the match earlier.) | — | — | — |
| 6 | London Bees | 5 | 0 | 1 | 4 | 2 | 31 | −29 | 1 | | — | — | 1–3 | 0–0 | 1–8 | — |

Source: FA WSL
Rules for classification: 1) Points; 2) Goal difference; 3) Number of goals scored
Notes:
1 May 2014
19:30

| London Bees | 0–0 | Millwall Lionesses |
|---|---|---|
| | Report |

The Hive Stadium, Canons Park
Attendance: 438
1 May 2014
19:45

| Reading | 1–2 | Chelsea |
|---|---|---|
| Kirby 15' | Report | Aluko 73'; Bassett 84' |

Cherrywood Road, Farnborough
Attendance: 224
Referee: Antony Foster
1 May 2014
19:45

| Arsenal | 3–0 | Watford |
|---|---|---|
| Ohno 65'; Ayisi 76'; Scott 86' | Report |

Meadow Park, Borehamwood
Attendance: 509
Referee: Paul Johnson

4 May 2014
14:00

| Millwall Lionesses | 1–1 | Reading |
|---|---|---|
| Keown 18' (o.g.) | Report | Bruton 71' (pen.) |

The Den, Bermondsey
Attendance: 210
Referee: Nigel Lugg
4 May 2014
14:00

| Watford | 1–5 | Chelsea |
|---|---|---|
| Natkiel 34' | Report | Rowell 18' (o.g.); Nagasato 25' (pen.); Chapman 28'; So-Yun 42', 51' |

Broadwater, Berkhamsted
Attendance: 232
Referee: Wayne Cartmel

14 May 2014
19:30

| London Bees | 1–3 | Watford |
|---|---|---|
| O'Leary 70' (pen.) | Report | Wiltshire 37'; Wynne 45'; Hector 89' |

The Hive Stadium, Canons Park
Attendance: 427
Referee: Paul Forrester
14 May 2014
19:30

| Chelsea | 4–0 | Millwall Lionesses |
|---|---|---|
| Aluko 37'; Brett 45'; Ayane 75', 84' | Report |

Wheatsheaf Park, Staines-upon-Thames
Attendance: 305
Referee: Reuben Simon
15 May 2014
19:45

| Reading | 2–0 | Arsenal |
|---|---|---|
| Kirby 7'; Bruton 35' | Report |

Cherrywood Road, Farnborough
Attendance: 387
Referee: Daniel Berry

6 July 2014
14:00

| Watford | 1–2 | Millwall Lionesses |
|---|---|---|
| Wynne 62' | Report | Stenning 65'; Lamb 80' |

Broadwater, Berkhamsted
Attendance: 194
Referee: Tim Donnellan
6 July 2014
14:00

| London Bees | 1–8 | Reading |
|---|---|---|
| Loomes 41' | Report | Kirby 1', 78'; Bragg 46', 64'; Fletcher 74', 88'; Bruton 75'; Williams 82' |

The Hive Stadium, Canons Park
Attendance: 496
Referee: Stephen Bates
6 July 2014
14:00

| Arsenal | 3–0 | Chelsea |
|---|---|---|
| Smith 42' (pen.), 82'; Ohno 68' | Report |

Meadow Park, Borehamwood
Attendance: 615
Referee: Dan Cook

10 July 2014
19:45

| Arsenal | 7–0 | London Bees |
|---|---|---|
| Ayisi 1'; Knaak 3', 68'; Stoney 25'; Carter 57'; Scott 84', 88' | Report |

Meadow Park, Borehamwood
Attendance: 271
Referee: Tim Donnellan

12 July 2014
18:00

| Reading | Cancelled | Watford |

Cherrywood Road, Farnborough
Attendance: NA
Referee: NA
13 July 2014
14:00

| Millwall Lionesses | 0–4 | Arsenal |
|---|---|---|
| | Report | Fahey 24'; Carter 31', 90+1'; Williamson 43' |

Eden Park Avenue, Beckenham
Attendance: 225
Referee: Stuart Franklin
13 July 2014
18:30

| Chelsea | 13–0 | London Bees |
|---|---|---|
| Borges 7'; Spence 11', 45'; So-Yun 28', 37'; Williams 29', 55', 64'; Wilhelmsson 40'; Coombs 53'; Groenen 69', 81'; Primus 88' | Report |

Wheatsheaf Park, Staines-upon-Thames
Attendance: 267
Referee: Paul Johnson

=== Group 2 ===
| Pos | Team | Pld | W | D | L | GF | GA | GD | Pts | Qualification | MCI | LIV | EVE | DON | SUN | DUR |
|---|---|---|---|---|---|---|---|---|---|---|---|---|---|---|---|---|
| 1 | Manchester City | 5 | 4 | 0 | 1 | 9 | 3 | +6 | 12 | Advance to knock-out stage | — | 2–1 | 1–0 | — | 2–0 | — |
| 2 | Liverpool | 5 | 3 | 1 | 1 | 17 | 5 | +12 | 10 | | — | — | 0–0 | 3–2 | 6–0 | — |
| 3 | Everton | 5 | 3 | 1 | 1 | 8 | 2 | +6 | 10 | | — | — | — | 3–1 | — | 3–0 |
| 4 | Doncaster Rovers Belles | 5 | 2 | 0 | 3 | 8 | 10 | −2 | 6 | | 2–1 | — | — | — | 0–2 | — |
| 5 | Sunderland | 5 | 2 | 0 | 3 | 5 | 10 | −5 | 6 | | — | — | 0–2 | — | — | 3–0 |
| 6 | Durham | 5 | 0 | 0 | 5 | 2 | 19 | −17 | 0 | | 0–3 | 1–7 | — | 1–3 | — | — |

Source: FA WSL
Rules for classification: 1) Points; 2) Goal difference; 3) Number of goals scored
30 April 2014
18:30

| Liverpool | 0–0 | Everton |
|---|---|---|
| | Report |

Halton Stadium, Widnes
Attendance: 770
Referee: Craig Buxton
30 April 2014
19:30

| Sunderland | 3–0 | Durham |
|---|---|---|
| Joice 45'; Mead 50'; Jordinson 90' (o.g.) | Report |

Eppleton Colliery Welfare Ground, Hetton-le-Hole
Attendance: 393
Referee: Paul Brown
1 May 2014
19:45

| Doncaster Rovers Belles | 2–1 | Manchester City |
|---|---|---|
| England 43'; Smith 55' | Report | Duggan 90' |

Eco-Power Stadium, Doncaster
Attendance: 308
Referee: Anthony Tankard

3 May 2014
18:30

| Liverpool | 6–0 | Sunderland |
|---|---|---|
| Davison 3'; Schröder 19'; Dowie 21', 25', 62'; Ómarsdóttir 75' | Report |

Halton Stadium, Widnes
Attendance: 403
Referee: Nick Gibbons
4 May 2014
12:00

| Manchester City | 1–0 | Everton |
|---|---|---|
| Flint 89' | Report |

City of Manchester Stadium, Manchester
Attendance: 1,462
Referee: Richard Holmes
4 May 2014
14:00

| Durham | 1–3 | Doncaster Rovers Belles |
|---|---|---|
| Dixon 69' | Report | Smith 20' (pen.); Johnson 62'; Sigsworth 88' |

New Ferens Park, Durham
Attendance: 156
Referee: Lindsey Robinson

14 May 2014
19:30

| Manchester City | 2–1 | Liverpool |
|---|---|---|
| McManus 4'; Christiansen 52' | Report | Dowie 19' |

Manchester Regional Arena, Manchester
Attendance: 746
Referee: Elizabeth Jane Simms
14 May 2014
19:30

| Everton | 3–0 | Durham |
|---|---|---|
| Jones 40'; Magill 49'; Davies 86' | Report |

Rossett Park, Crosby
Attendance: 331
Referee: Steve Rudd
15 May 2014
19:45

| Doncaster Rovers Belles | 0–2 | Sunderland |
|---|---|---|
| | Report | Mead 5'; Furness 25' |

Eco-Power Stadium, Doncaster
Attendance: 321
Referee: Andrew Park

6 July 2014
14:00

| Durham | 1–7 | Liverpool |
|---|---|---|
| Dixon 88' | Report | Dowie 15', 55'; Bonner 50'; Zelem 65', 69'; Davison 82', 84' |

New Ferens Park, Durham
Attendance: 339
Referee: Marc Edwards
6 July 2014
14:00

| Manchester City | 2–0 | Sunderland |
|---|---|---|
| Houghton 74'; Duggan 78' | Report |

Manchester Regional Arena, Manchester
Attendance: 670
Referee: Paul Graham
6 July 2014
14:00

| Everton | 3–1 | Doncaster Rovers Belles |
|---|---|---|
| Magill 35'; Whelan 40'; Chaplen 68' | Report | Smith 62' (pen.) |

Rossett Park, Crosby
Attendance: 288
Referee: David McNamara

12 July 2014
18:30

| Liverpool | 3–2 | Doncaster Rovers Belles |
|---|---|---|
| Dowie 8', 44'; Da Costa 14' | Report | England 59'; Sigsworth 81' |

Halton Stadium, Widnes
Attendance: 402
Referee: Justin Hayes
13 July 2014
14:00

| Sunderland | 0–2 | Everton |
|---|---|---|
| | Report | Parris 36'; Davies 76' |

Eppleton Colliery Welfare Ground, Hetton-le-Hole
Attendance: 323
Referee: John Matthews
13 July 2014
18:30

| Durham | 0–3 | Manchester City |
|---|---|---|
| | Report | Johnston 27'; Duggan 38'; Scott 83' |

New Ferens Park, Durham
Attendance: 379
Referee: Matthew Dicicco

=== Group 3 ===
| Pos | Team | Pld | W | D | L | GF | GA | GD | Pts | Qualification | NTC | BRI | BIR | YEO | AST | OXF |
|---|---|---|---|---|---|---|---|---|---|---|---|---|---|---|---|---|
| 1 | Notts County | 5 | 4 | 1 | 0 | 16 | 1 | +15 | 13 | Advance to knock-out stage | — | 1–1 | — | — | 5–0 | — |
| 2 | Bristol Academy | 5 | 3 | 2 | 0 | 17 | 4 | +13 | 11 | | — | — | — | 0–0 | 2–1 | 9–2 |
| 3 | Birmingham City | 5 | 3 | 0 | 2 | 6 | 8 | −2 | 9 | | 0–2 | 0–5 | — | — | — | 2–0 |
| 4 | Yeovil Town | 5 | 2 | 1 | 2 | 5 | 6 | −1 | 7 | | 0–4 | — | 1–2 | — | 2–0 | — |
| 5 | Aston Villa | 5 | 1 | 0 | 4 | 2 | 11 | −9 | 3 | | — | — | 0–2 | — | — | 1–0 |
| 6 | Oxford United | 5 | 0 | 0 | 5 | 2 | 18 | −16 | 0 | | 0–4 | — | — | 0–2 | — | — |

Source: FA WSL
Rules for classification: 1) Points; 2) Goal difference; 3) Number of goals scored
30 April 2014
19:30

| Notts County | 5–0 | Aston Villa |
|---|---|---|
| Susi 3', 40'; Clarke 20', 76'; Friend 24' | Report |

Meadow Lane, Nottingham
Attendance: 847
Referee: Stuart Richardson
1 May 2014
19:00

| Yeovil Town | 1–2 | Birmingham City |
|---|---|---|
| Bray 47' (pen.) | Report | Wilkinson 31'; Westwood 41' |

Raleigh Grove, Sherborne
Attendance: 168
Referee: Glenn Barter
1 May 2014
19:00

| Bristol Academy | 9–2 | Oxford United Ladies |
|---|---|---|
| del Río 8', 10', 45'; Pablos 16', 23'; Watts 67', 74', 77'; Rose 84' | Report | Stanley 15'; Nutman 59' |

Stoke Gifford Stadium, Filton
Attendance: 723
Referee: Kevin Morris

4 May 2014
14:00

| Yeovil Town | 2–0 | Aston Villa |
|---|---|---|
| Bleazard 7'; Bray 27' | Report |

Raleigh Grove, Sherborne
Attendance: 181
Referee: Stephen Fearnley
4 May 2014
17:00

| Notts County | 1–1 | Bristol Academy |
|---|---|---|
| Clarke 29' | Report | Watts 54' |

Meadow Lane, Nottingham
Attendance: 501
Referee: James Bell

13 May 2014
19:00

| Aston Villa | 0–2 | Birmingham City |
|---|---|---|
| | | Keryakoplis 7'; Moore 14' |

Villa Park, Birmingham
Attendance: 602
Referee: Amy Rayner Fearn
15 May 2014
19:00

| Bristol Academy | 0–0 | Yeovil Town |
|---|---|---|
| | Report |

Stoke Gifford Stadium, Filton
Attendance: 763
Referee: Lee Sheridan
15 May 2014
19:00

| Oxford United | 0–4 | Notts County |
|---|---|---|
| | Report | Friend 24'; Clarke 49', 70'; Whelan 72' |

Northcourt Road, Abingdon
Attendance: 286
Referee: Sian Piret

2 July 2014
19:45

| Birmingham City | 2–0 | Oxford United |
|---|---|---|
| Carney 63'; Westwood 75' | Report |

Damson Park, Solihull
Attendance: 254
Referee: Sian Massey

5 July 2014
18:00

| Bristol Academy | 2–1 | Aston Villa |
|---|---|---|
| Harding 58'; McCatty 72' | Report | Davies 40' |

Stoke Gifford Stadium, Filton
Attendance: 524
Referee: Simon Shaw
6 July 2014
14:00

| Oxford United | 0–2 | Yeovil Town |
|---|---|---|
| | Report | Bleazard 38'; Bray 49' |

Northcourt Road, Abingdon
Attendance: 198
Referee: Ben James
6 July 2014
14:00

| Birmingham City | 0–2 | Notts County |
|---|---|---|
| | Report | Clarke 75'; Corsie 90+4' |

Damson Park, Solihull
Attendance: 481
Referee: Akil Howson

12 July 2014
17:00

| Yeovil Town | 0–4 | Notts County |
|---|---|---|
| | Report | Susi 19', 48'; Clarke 54', 63' |

Raleigh Grove, Sherborne
Attendance: 243
Referee: Adrian Quelch
13 July 2014
14:00

| Aston Villa | 1–0 | Oxford United |
|---|---|---|
| Davies 52' (pen.) | Report |

Central Ground, Sutton Coldfield
Attendance: 235
Referee: Sarah Garratt
13 July 2014
18:30

| Birmingham City | 0–5 | Bristol Academy |
|---|---|---|
| | Report | Harding 10', 37'; Pablos 37', 50', 90' |

Damson Park, Solihull
Attendance: 331
Referee: Dumitru-Ravel Cheosiaua

== Knock-out stage ==
Semi-finals were drawn after the group stage and not predetermined. All teams were from the WSL 1. Arsenal reached their fourth final in as many years and would meet Manchester City.

Semi-finals
7 September
Arsenal (a.e.t.) | 2
Notts County | 0
7 September
Chelsea | 0
Manchester City | 1

Final
16 October
Arsenal | 0
Manchester City | 1

=== Semi-finals ===
| Team 1 | Score | Team 2 |
|---|---|---|
| Arsenal | 2–0 | Notts County |
| Manchester City | 1–0 | Chelsea |

7 September 2014

| Arsenal | 2–0 (a.e.t.) | Notts County |
|---|---|---|
| Weir 99'; Smith 117' (pen.) | Report |

Meadow Park, Borehamwood
Attendance: 692
Referee: Ian Fissenden

7 September 2014
14:00 BST

| Manchester City | 1–0 | Chelsea |
|---|---|---|
| Duggan 51' | Report |

Ewen Fields, Hyde
Attendance: 752
Referee: Helen Byrne

=== Final ===
| Team 1 | Score | Team 2 |
|---|---|---|
| Arsenal | 0–1 | Manchester City |

Wycombe Wanderers' Adams Park was to stage the final match. The match was broadcast live on BT Sport.

16 October 2014
19:45

| Arsenal | 0–1 | Manchester City |
|---|---|---|
| | Report | Christiansen 73' |

Adams Park, High Wycombe
Attendance: 3,697
Referee: Nigel Lugg

== See also ==
- 2014 FA WSL 1
- 2014 FA WSL 2
