= The Pledge: Requiem for the Detective Novel =

1958 novella by Friedrich Dürrenmatt

First edition cover, U.K. release

The Pledge (German: Das Versprechen) is a crime novella by Swiss author Friedrich Dürrenmatt, published in 1958, after Dürrenmatt thought that his previous movie script, Es geschah am hellichten Tag ("It happened in broad daylight") did not have a realistic ending. The film's star, the popular actor Heinz Rühmann, had insisted that Dürrenmatt collaborate with the screenwriter Hans Jacoby, and the story had an ending in line with that of a typical detective story. Dürrenmatt, however, was a critic of that genre of literature, and thus he set out to write Das Versprechen as an expression of that criticism. Although it has been absent from some subsequent editions of the novella, the title of the original edition included the telling subtitle Requiem for the Detective Novel (German: Requiem auf den Kriminalroman).

== Plot summary ==
=== Main story ===
Dürrenmatt uses a first-person narrative to insert himself into a frame story as a writer of detective fiction. However, the primary narrator is actually a character named Dr. H., a retired police chief who takes on the role of explaining to Dürrenmatt's first-person character the flaws of the detective literature genre. To do so, Dr. H. relates the story of one of his former inspectors, Matthäi, who on his last day with the department, found himself called into an investigation of child murder. A suspect soon confessed to the crime, but knowing that the confession came only after the man was browbeaten in a relentless, 20-hour interrogation, Matthäi's keen police instincts told him that the man was not the real murderer. Matthäi felt that there was a serial killer at work, with the girl's murder being related to other child murders that had occurred in the surrounding cantons. However, he was alone in that assessment and the police closed the case.

Having made a solemn promise to the parents of the murdered girl that he would find the culprit, Matthäi abandoned the plans he had made for his life in retirement and instead continued investigating the case as a private citizen. He was warned by a psychiatrist that the murderer he sought likely did not exist and thus he might drive himself mad with his obsession in finding the man. Matthäi, however, was undeterred.

Through shrewd detective work, and driven by a growing and near maniacal obsession with the case, Matthäi was able to construct a detailed profile of the likely killer, down to the very road the murderer would probably travel to and from his evil deeds. Matthäi purchased a gas station along the route and then hired a housekeeper with a daughter named Annemarie, who matched the profile of the murdered girls. With Annemarie in place, living along the road as bait for the killer, Matthäi waited for the villain to come to him.

Matthäi's plan seemed to come to fruition, as one day the girl reported having encountered a man matching the profile Matthäi had constructed of the killer. She even included details that tied the man's behavior to that of a man the original murdered girl had reported seeing prior to her death. Matthäi planned to apprehend the killer the next day, having convinced the skeptical police to indulge him and surround the area where Annemarie said she was to meet the man again. They had lain in wait for him, but no one ever arrived.

The failure proved to be utterly devastating for Matthäi. The police and all other outsiders were finally convinced that no other killer existed and that Matthäi's quest had been borne solely of his own madness. His relationship with Annemarie and her mother was destroyed through their discovery that despite the genuine love they had developed for him, he had seen Annemarie merely as bait for his trap. Unable to fathom how his intricate and detailed detective work had not resulted in a triumphant resolution to the case, Matthäi sank finally into insanity and alcoholism.

Only years later, far too late to be of any use to Matthäi, was the truth revealed that his instincts and detective work actually had been entirely correct. The murderer had not arrived for his meeting with Annemarie on the fateful day simply because he had been killed in a car accident while on his way to the rendezvous.

=== Es geschah am hellichten Tag ===
In the original film Es geschah am hellichten Tag, the story was directly that of the Matthäi character, rather than being framed through its retelling by Dr. H., as in Das Versprechen. At the end of the movie, Matthäi demonstrates his concern for Annemarie by sending her and her mother away to safety before attempting to spring his final trap upon the murderer. The murderer arrives and is killed, thus vindicating Matthäi's persistence in pursuing the case and leading to a happy reunion with Annemarie at the story's conclusion.

=== Criticism of detective fiction ===
At the novella's end, Dürrenmatt offers to the reader an implicit acknowledgment of the existence of the Es geschah am hellichten Tag version of Matthäi's story, by having Dr. H. mention that the tale of Matthäi would make a perfectly suitable entry into the genre of detective fiction, if only the ending were changed such that the killer arrived for his appointment with Annemarie and fell into Matthäi's trap. Dr. H.'s point in relating the story is to demonstrate to the first-person narrator the folly of such fiction. The first of Dr. H.'s two main complaints about typical detective fiction is the idea that the criminal is always caught. He regards this as a relatively minor transgression, however, as even the most naive of readers would be aware that in real life, sometimes a crime is not solved. The greater problem, to Dr. H.'s way of thinking, is the manner in which the solving of a crime is depicted in detective fiction.

In such literature, the task of solving a crime is presented in a way that makes it akin to that of solving a mathematical equation. A properly formed equation can always be solved if enough of its variables can be computed and if the mathematician possesses enough skill to handle the equation's complexity. Detective fiction often depicts crime-solving in a similar light. Thus, a naïve reader of such fiction might well conclude that, even in real life, if a detective fails to solve a crime, it is either because the perpetrator executed the crime well enough to avoid leaving enough clues (like an equation for which not enough variables could be computed) or because the detective was not clever enough to properly locate, assemble and analyze those clues to determine what had occurred (like a mathematician who lacks the skill to handle the complexity of the equation with which he is presented).

In mentioning the idea of an alternative ending to Matthäi's story, Dr. H. is noting that with such an ending the story would (and, in Es geschah am hellichten Tag, did) follow the mathematical equation presentation typical of standard detective fiction. Given the actual ending as related by Dr. H., Matthäi's failure to solve the crime arose solely because of an automobile accident; a completely random twist of fate that had nothing to do with either how cleverly the perpetrator committed the crime or any lack of competence on the part of Matthäi as an investigator. Dr. H. describes Matthäi as having been an investigative genius at a level unmatched even by fictional detectives. According to Dr. H. the sad story of Matthäi demonstrates that contrary to the mathematical precision usually presented in a detective novel the outcome of true police detective work finds itself far more subject to chance, coincidence and events outside the control of either the criminal or the investigator.

== Editions in English ==
- The Pledge London: Jonathan Cape, 1959
- The Pledge New York: Alfred A. Knopf, 1959
- The Pledge New York: New American Library, 1959
- The Pledge Harmondsworth (UK): Penguin, 1964
- The Pledge New York: Berkeley, 2000
- The Pledge translated by Joel Agee. Chicago: The University of Chicago Press, 2006. ISBN 978-0-226-17437-2

== Adaptations ==
- The novel's version of the main story was first adapted to film in 1958, as Es geschah am hellichten Tag (El cebo), a Spanish-Swiss-German film directed by Ladislao Vajda.
- An Italian TV movie was made in 1979, as La promessa.
- A Hungarian adaptation was made by György Fehér, Szürkület (1990)
- Another adaptation was the Dutch movie The Cold Light of Day (1996).
- In 2001 the novel received its most faithful adaptation in The Pledge, starring Jack Nicholson and directed by Sean Penn.

== Classroom use ==
Like Dürrenmatt's The Judge and His Hangman, this novel is widely read in schools and in many German studies courses in schools and universities. The Pledge is also used in many literature studies, since it analyzes the context and use of symbols.
