= Das Versprechen =

Das Versprechen may refer to:

- Das Versprechen: Requiem auf den Kriminalroman, original title of The Pledge: Requiem for the Detective Novel, a 1958 German novella by Friedrich Dürrenmatt
- Das Versprechen, original German title of 1995 film The Promise
- Das Versprechen, original German title of 2016 documentary Killing for Love (film)
