= The Pledge (film) =

2001 film by Sean Penn

- Theatrical release poster
- Directed by: Sean Penn
- Screenplay by: Jerzy Kromolowski; Mary Olson-Kromolowski
- Based on: The Pledge (1958 novella) by Friedrich Dürrenmatt
- Produced by: Michael Fitzgerald; Sean Penn; Elie Samaha
- Starring: Jack Nicholson; Patricia Clarkson; Benicio del Toro; Aaron Eckhart; Helen Mirren; Tom Noonan; Robin Wright Penn; Vanessa Redgrave; Mickey Rourke; Sam Shepard; Lois Smith; Harry Dean Stanton
- Cinematography: Chris Menges
- Edited by: Jay Lash Cassidy
- Music by: Klaus Badelt; Hans Zimmer
- Production companies: Franchise Pictures; Clyde Is Hungry Films
- Distributed by: Morgan Creek Productions, Inc. (through Warner Bros. Pictures)
- Release date: January 19, 2001
- Running time: 123 minutes
- Country: United States
- Language: English
- Budget: $37 million
- Box office: $29.4 million

The Pledge is a 2001 American neo-noir psychological thriller film co-produced and directed by Sean Penn and starring Jack Nicholson alongside an ensemble supporting cast of Patricia Clarkson, Aaron Eckhart, Helen Mirren, Robin Wright Penn, Vanessa Redgrave, Sam Shepard, Mickey Rourke, Tom Noonan, Lois Smith and Benicio del Toro. It is based on the 1958 novella by Swiss writer Friedrich Dürrenmatt.

The film competed for the Palme d'Or at the 2001 Cannes Film Festival. The Pledge was released by Morgan Creek Productions, Inc. (through Warner Bros. Pictures) on January 19, 2001. Though a commercial disappointment by grossing $29.4 million against a $37 million budget, it was well-received by critics.

== Plot ==
Aging Reno, Nevada, police detective Jerry Black attends a retirement party hosted by his department during which Captain Pollack presents tickets to Jerry for a fishing trip in Mexico as a gift. The celebration is interrupted by the discovery of a murdered child, Ginny Larsen. Jerry decides to go with another detective, Stan Krolak, to the scene of the crime.

Jerry delivers the bad news to Ginny's parents, and the mother, Margaret Larsen, makes Jerry swear on a cross, made by their daughter, that he will find the killer. A suspect, Toby Jay Wadenah, a Native American man with an intellectual disability, is found the next day. Stan uses Toby's disorder to his advantage, convincing him that he killed Ginny. After having confessed to doing so, Toby steals a deputy's gun and commits suicide. An autopsy on Ginny proves that she had consumed chocolate before she died; wrappers found in Toby's truck solidify the likelihood that he killed the little girl, and the case is closed, despite Jerry's suspicions.

Still adamant about his pledge to find the killer, Jerry chooses not to go to Mexico and misses his flight. Instead, he visits Ginny's grandmother, Annalise Hansen, who tells him of the many stories that she and Ginny used to read; one tells of an angel who descends from Heaven in order to fly a deceased child over all the places it loved in life, before delivering it to God. Jerry then visits one of Ginny's friends, Becky Fiske, who reveals that she had made friends with a man she called "The Giant" shortly before Ginny was killed. Jerry finds a picture Ginny drew of "The Giant", but it does not resemble Toby, and features a black station wagon and not the red truck driven by Toby. Jerry takes the drawing with him.

Jerry goes to Stan and asks him to reopen the case. Stan refuses but gets Jerry more information about similar cases in the area. Jerry's investigations reveal three local, unsolved cases that bear the same modus operandi as seen with Ginny's, which Toby could not have possibly committed because he was incarcerated at the time. Jerry presents his research and Ginny's drawing to Captain Pollack and Stan, who are doubtful.

While fishing, Jerry notices a gas station near the center of the cases. After buying the station, Jerry moves into the house behind it and meets local waitress/bartender Lori, and her daughter, Chrissy. He takes an interest in Chrissy. One night, Lori shows up at Jerry's house, bruised and battered, and explains that her ex (against whom Lori has a restraining order) attacked her. Jerry, out of concern for their safety, suggests that Lori and Chrissy move in with him temporarily; she agrees. Over time, Jerry develops a fatherly relationship with Chrissy. While Chrissy is making a snowman, a snowplow driver stops to talk to her; Jerry looks on with suspicion. Jerry and Lori develop a romantic relationship.

One day, local pastor Gary Jackson visits Chrissy outside the station. Jerry suspects that Jackson is Ginny's killer after he invites Chrissy to his church. Jerry rushes to the church after Jackson picks her up one day while he is fishing, but finds it was nothing more than a close call, and that Jackson is not the killer.

Meanwhile, Chrissy meets a man who drives a black car with a toy porcupine hanging on the rear mirror; porcupines were another aspect of Ginny's story as told to Becky. That night, while Jerry is reading a bedtime story to Chrissy, she tells him that she met a "wizard" who gave her porcupine candies and told her not to tell anyone about their interaction. (A later scene hints that the chocolates are laced with narcotics.) Chrissy tells Jerry she is supposed to meet the "wizard" again the next day at a nearby picnic area. Using Chrissy as bait, Jerry stages a sting operation with Stan's help to catch the killer. However, while on the way to the meeting, the "wizard" dies in a car accident; hours later, the SWAT team gives up and leaves Jerry alone. They inform Lori of what is happening. She confronts Jerry angrily about putting Chrissy in danger and breaks up with him.

Sometime later, Jerry sits by himself on a bench in front of his ruined gas station. Despondent, destitute, and drunk, Jerry ends up all alone, mumbling to himself that the killer is still out there.

== Cast ==
- Jack Nicholson as Jerry Black
- Patricia Clarkson as Margaret Larsen
- Benicio del Toro as Toby Jay Wadenah
- Aaron Eckhart as Stan Krolak
- Helen Mirren as Doctor
- Tom Noonan as Gary Jackson
- Robin Wright Penn as Lori
- Pauline Roberts as Chrissy
- Vanessa Redgrave as Annalise Hansen
- Mickey Rourke as Jim Olstad
- Sam Shepard as Eric Pollack
- Harry Dean Stanton as Floyd Cage
- Dale Dickey as Strom
- Costas Mandylor as Monash Deputy
- Michael O'Keefe as Duane Larsen
- Lois Smith as Helen Jackson
- Brittany Tiplady as Becky Fiske
- Eileen Ryan as Jean
- Adam Nelson as deputy

== Production ==
The Pledge is based on Friedrich Dürrenmatt's 1958 novella The Pledge: Requiem for the Detective Novel. Dürrenmatt wrote the novella to refine the theme he originally developed in the screenplay for the 1958 German-language film It Happened in Broad Daylight.

The film was shot mainly on location in the British Columbia interior. While the opening scenes were filmed in Reno, Nevada, the rest of the film was shot in Keremeos, Princeton, Hedley, Merritt and Lytton, all in British Columbia. Tom Noonan recounts that, when Battlefield Earth flopped, the film's backers "were so freaked out... that they got on Sean [Penn] about finishing on time and finishing under budget, which wasn't really possible, because they were shooting in the mountains, and there were four or five scenes that I still had to shoot, which they never shot, which explain who I am in that film. Because I'm not the guy who killed the kids. I'm not the bad guy in the film." He has repeated this assertion: "There's another guy who's in a Mercedes that gets burned at the end. And people tell me I look like the guy in the Mercedes but that's not me. I'm the nice guy in that movie. At least in the script, I am."

== Home video ==
The film was released on DVD and VHS on June 19, 2001. The UK dvd release shows the running time as 118m and has a 15 certificate, but the Australian dvd release shows a running time of 123m with an R18+ rating.

== Reception ==
=== Box office ===
The Pledge did not perform well at the box office. The film opened in 1,275 theaters and grossed $5,765,347, with an average of $4,521 per theater and ranking #11 at the box office. The film ultimately earned $19,733,089 domestically and $9,686,202 internationally for a total of $29,419,291, below its $35 million production budget.

=== Critical response ===
The Pledge received mainly positive reviews from critics. The film has a score of 78% on Rotten Tomatoes based on 125 reviews, with an average rating of 6.88/10. The critical consensus states: "Though its subject matter is grim and may make viewers queasy, The Pledge features an excellent, subtle performance by Jack Nicholson." The film also has a score of 71 out of 100 on Metacritic based on 33 critics. Audiences polled by CinemaScore graded the film "D" on a scale of A+ to F.

James Berardinelli gave The Pledge three out of five, calling it "clever in the way that it gradually reveals things, but never gives us too much information at one time". Roger Ebert gave the film three and a half stars out of four, and in 2012 upgraded it to four stars and added it to his "Great Movies" list, writing, "The last third of the movie is where most police stories go on autopilot, with obligatory chases, stalkings and confrontations. That's when The Pledge grows most compelling. Penn and Nicholson take risks with the material and elevate the movie to another, unanticipated, haunting level."

=== Accolades ===
- Sean Penn – Palme d'Or at the 2001 Cannes Film Festival – NOMINATED
- Grand Prix of the Belgian Syndicate of Cinema Critics – NOMINATED
- 2002 for the Danish Bodil – NOMINATED
- Benicio Del Toro – 2002 ALMA Award – NOMINATED
- Brittany Tiplady – 2002 Young Artist Award – NOMINATED
- Hans Zimmer – 2001 World Soundtrack Award – NOMINATED
