= Ray Kegeris =

American swimmer

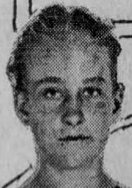
- Kederis at 15, as swimmer for LAAC

Personal information
- National team: United States
- Born: September 10, 1901 Bellwood, Nebraska, U.S.
- Died: August 14, 1975 (aged 73) Los Angeles, California, U.S.
- Height: 5 ft 7 in (1.70 m)
- Spouse: Emily

Sport
- Sport: Swimming
- Strokes: Backstroke
- Club: Los Angeles Athletic Club (LAAC)
- Coach: Vance Veith; George Freeth (LAAC)
Medal record
Men's swimming
Representing the United States
Olympic Games
Silver medal – second place	1920 Antwerp	100 m backstroke

Raymond Kegeris (September 10, 1901 – August 14, 1975) was an American competition swimmer for the Los Angeles Athletic Club who worked as a lifeguard and represented the United States as an 18-year-old at the 1920 Summer Olympics in Antwerp, Belgium, capturing a silver medal in the 100-meter backstroke.

Ray Kegeris was born on September 10, 1901 in Bellwood, Nebraska, to Daru W. "Frank" Kegeris, and wife Nora Burrows Kegeris. Kegeris's brother Clyde also swam and would later serve as a lifeguard. Moving to Southern California around 1905 with his family, where his father would later work for the Pacific Railway Company and the Standard Oil Company in Redondo Beach, California, Ray attended Redondo Union High School, around 20 miles southwest of Los Angeles. Fellow 1920 American Olympic swimmer Ludy Langer was also a graduate of Redondo High. By 1910, Kegeris was a Junior Pacific Coast Diving Champion.

== Los Angeles Athletic Club ==
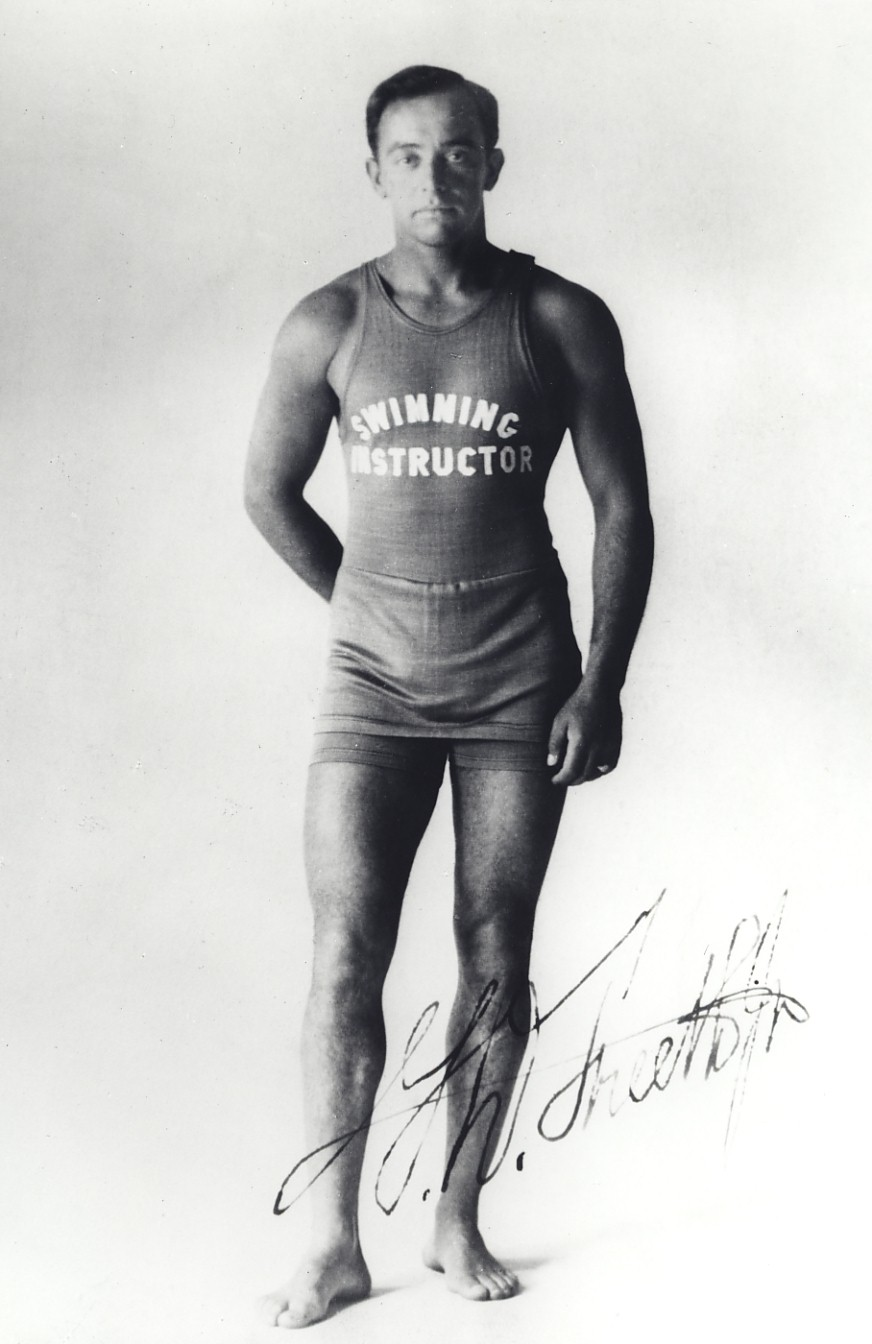
Coach George Freeth

As early as 1912, Kegeris was swimming and giving primarily diving exhibitions with the Los Angeles Athletic Club. At the age of 12, on June 20–21, 1914, at a swimming and diving exhibition at Huntingdon Beach, honoring the opening of a new pier, Kegeris was described as a "Champion diver" swimming for the Los Angeles Athletic Club. By January 1916, Kegeris was considered a rising star in junior competition in both swimming and diving, while competing with the Los Angeles Athletic Club, where he was coached by Vance Veith. George Freeth, who began coaching at the LAAC from around 1913-1915, was also an important mentor to Kegeris during his time with the LAAC. Freeth was an accomplished swimmer who coached diving, swimming, and water polo and was a Redondo Beach lifeguard, who enjoyed surfing, was half native Hawaiian, and was born in Honolulu. Freeth had helped start the life guarding service at Redondo Beach, and would work with life guarding services in other California coastal cities.

== Other sports ==
In January 1920, Kegeris also captained a water polo team representing Redondo Union High School. The team played the Long Beach High Team that January. By April 1920, Kegeris also swam for a team representing his Redondo Union High School, that was coached by Ted Combs and was preparing for the Southern California and Bay City Aquatic Meets in May 1920. As a versatile athlete, Kegeris also played football for Redondo Union High School, and for Oneonta Military Academy.

In late April 1920, Kegeris won the 100-yard junior national backstroke championship at Neptune, California, with a time of 1:12.4.

== 1920 Olympic Silver Medal ==
At the age of 18, in July 1920, Kegeris won the American Olympic Trials in the 100m backstroke with a time of 1.22 3/5s at Lincoln Park Lagoon in Chicago, IL. His time was only 2.2 seconds behind the Olympic record held by Harry Hebner of the Illinois Athletic Club. Ted Combs, a swimming instructor at Redondo Beach, where Kegeris also trained at times and worked as a lifeguard, was partially credited by one source for helping to train Kegeris in the backstroke for two months prior to the Olympic trials.

Kegeris won a silver medal for finishing second in the final of the men's 100-meter backstroke event at the 1920 Olympics in Antwerp, Belgium, with a time of 1:16.8 behind Hawaiian-born American Warren Kealoha whose time of 1:15.2 was a new world record.

Following his Olympic silver medal, Kegeris won the American Athletic Union (AAU) 150-yard indoor backstroke title in both 1921 and 1922. Kegeris also won a number of backstroke titles at the AAU Championships for the Pacific Coast.

He married Emily A. Milward Kegeris.

In June, 1926, while he was employed as a Redondo Beach Lifeguard, his surf board was damaged by a thresher shark while he was surfing near Redondo Beach. The shark was subdued before injuring Kegeris.

=== Death ===
Kegeris died on August 14, 1975 at his home in the Hermosa Beach area outside Los Angeles. He was survived by his wife Emily, and two cousins. He was a member of the Eagle's Lodge for 53 years, and the Elk's lodge. Memorial services were held on the afternoon of Monday, August 18, 1975 at Niland Mortuary in Torrance, California. He was later cremated and his ashes were scattered in the surf off Redondo Beach.
