= Accidental Waltz =

- Directed by: Svetlana Proskurina
- Written by: Pavel Finn
- Starring: Alla Sokolova; Aleksei Serebryakov
- Cinematography: Dmitriy Mass
- Edited by: Leda Semyonova
- Music by: Vyacheslav Gajvoronsky
- Release date: 1990
- Country: Soviet Union
- Language: Russian

Accidental Waltz (Russian: Случайный вальс, romanized: Sluchaynyy val's) is a 1990 Soviet romantic drama directed by Svetlana Proskurina. It won the Golden Leopard in 1990 at the 43rd Locarno International Film Festival.

== Plot ==
The life of Tatiana Prokofievna – an aging woman with a diva's behavior – is banal and dull. To escape the everyday slumber she seeks companionship of young men. She provides shelter to three people, two men and one woman, and becomes involved in their problems. Her ex-boyfriend has married a younger woman. Tatjana is forced to keep her loneliness hidden because of her role as hostess.

== Cast ==
- Alla Sokolova – Tatjana Prokofievna
- Aleksei Serebryakov – Sergei
- Tatiana Bondariova – Nadia
- Sergei Parapanov – Gena
- Viktor Proskoerin – Viktor Stepanovitch
