= George Freeth =

American surfer (1883–1919)

George Douglas Freeth Jr.
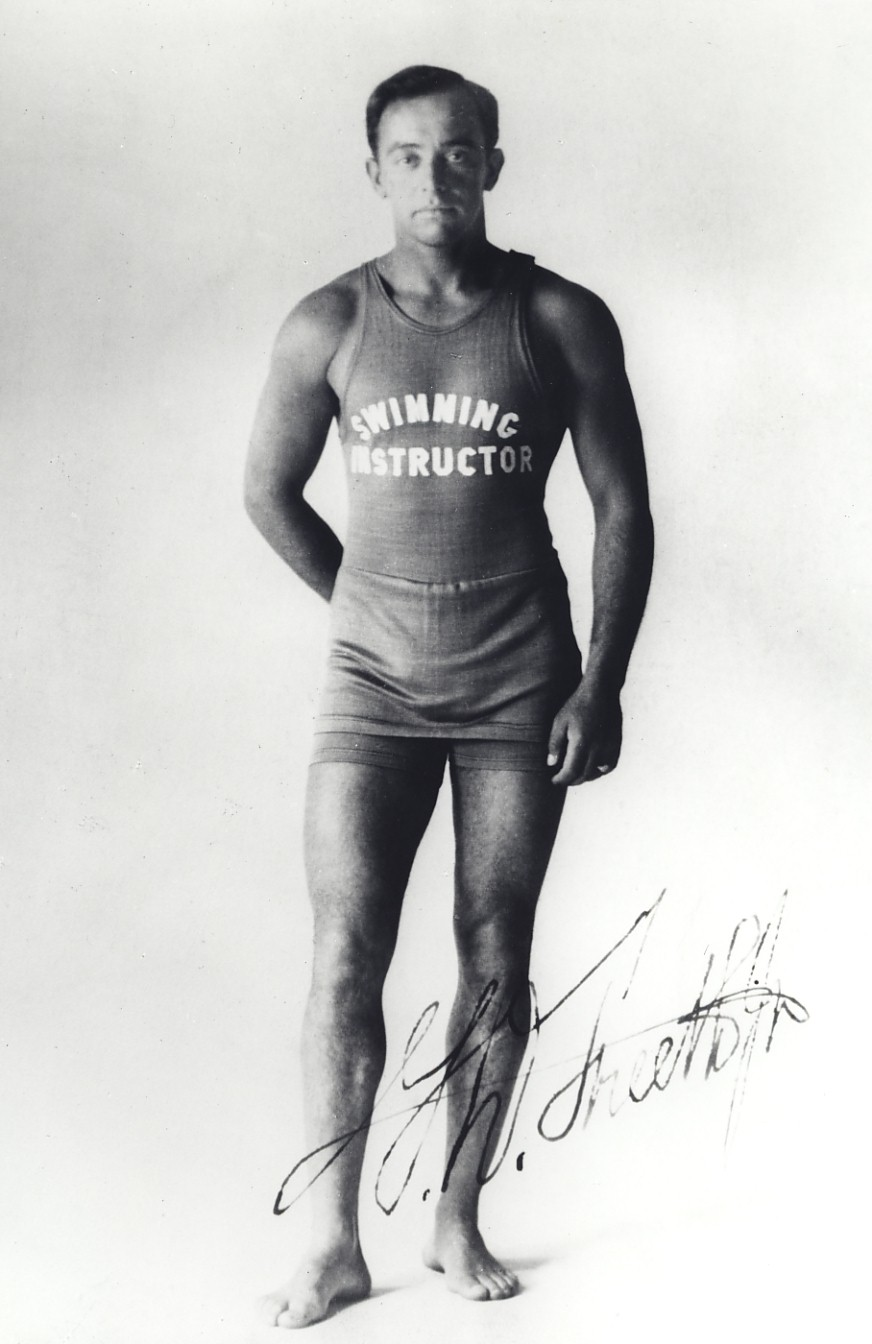
- Born: November 8, 1883; Oahu, Hawaii, United States
- Died: April 7, 1919 (aged 35); San Diego, California, United States

George Douglas Freeth Jr. (November 8, 1883 – April 7, 1919) was an American lifeguard, surfer, and swimming instructor of English and Native Hawaiian descent. His mother's side of the family ranked among Hawaiian royal ministers under King Kalakaua. His father's side of the family traced its ancestry to senior officers in the British military. Freeth's youth was spent in and around the ocean at Waikiki where he learned to swim and dive with local children. He later helped to renew interest in the traditional Hawaiian sport of surfing at Waikiki in the early twentieth century. He then popularized the sport in Southern California when he arrived in Los Angeles in 1907.

Freeth worked as a lifeguard throughout his nearly dozen years living in the Golden State and helped to build the foundation for the state's professional lifeguard service. His contributions also include competing as an amateur and professional swimmer and water polo player. He became a well-known swimming coach as well while working at the Los Angeles Athletic Club, training Olympic swimmers such as Duke Kahanamoku, Ludy Langer, and Ray Kegeris.

Freeth moved to San Diego in 1916 and helped to spread the popularity of surfing and swimming while employed as a swimming coach at the San Diego Rowing Club. He also continued his work as a lifeguard. He contracted the flu during the pandemic of 1918 and died in San Diego in April 1919. His contributions to California beach culture helped to create the state's renowned traditions in lifeguarding and surfing.

== Family background ==
Freeth was born in Waikiki, Hawai`i. His mother, Elizabeth "Lizzie" Kaili Green, was the daughter of William Lowthian Green, a prominent English politician in Hawai'i. Freeth's maternal grandmother, Elizabeth Lepeka Kahalaikulani Grimes, was of Native Hawaiian and American descent.

Freeth's father, George Douglas Freeth Sr., came from a distinguished British military lineage. Freeth's paternal grandfather, James Holt Freeth, and great-grandfather, Sir James Freeth, were both high-ranking generals in the British army. Freeth Sr. was born in Hythe, Kent, England, and spent several years in Ireland during childhood, perhaps the origin of the myth that Freeth's father was Irish (Freeth's life and his contributions to surfing and lifeguarding are a significant part of the documentary film Waveriders even though Freeth was not Irish).

Freeth had three brothers (William, Charles, and Alexander), and two younger sisters (Marjorie and Dorothy).

== Early life ==
=== A Pacific Ocean childhood ===
Freeth grew up in Waikiki, and his Hawaiian culture encouraged him to spend time in the ocean. Aquatic sports were a large part of his early youth, where competitions (such as rowing and diving) allowed Freeth to develop the water skills that he would use throughout his life. Freeth is quoted as saying, “I can not remember the day when I couldn’t swim. The first days I can remember were those spent at Waikiki Beach, four miles distant from Honolulu, Hawaii, where, with hundreds of native boys, I swam and dove a greater part of the time.” Freeth grew up in the last years of the Hawaiian monarchy before American businessmen forced Queen Liliʻuokalani from power in 1893 during the Overthrow of the Hawaiian Kingdom.

His youth included much travel—his father moved the family frequently due to his many business enterprises, at one point moving to Laysan island. Laysan was (and is) home to a large migrant seabird population that produced guano, which Freeth Senior's company mined for fertilizer. Freeth spent more than a year on the small island alongside the Japanese immigrant workers his father employed. Laysan and the surrounding ocean became a playground where Freeth swam and developed other aquatic skills in the waves. When he was fourteen (1897), his father took him for a summer to Clipperton Island and another guano mining business.

Freeth spent his teenage years in athletic competitions and developed skills that he would later use to enhance lifeguarding and surfing in California. He competed in swimming, tub racing, and high diving at Sutro Baths in San Francisco beginning in 1898. While Freeth competed in California, his mother began divorce proceedings against his father who had abandoned the family and refused to send money home. Freeth traveled between Hawai`i and the United States during the years 1899–1903, pursuing work and success in athletic events.

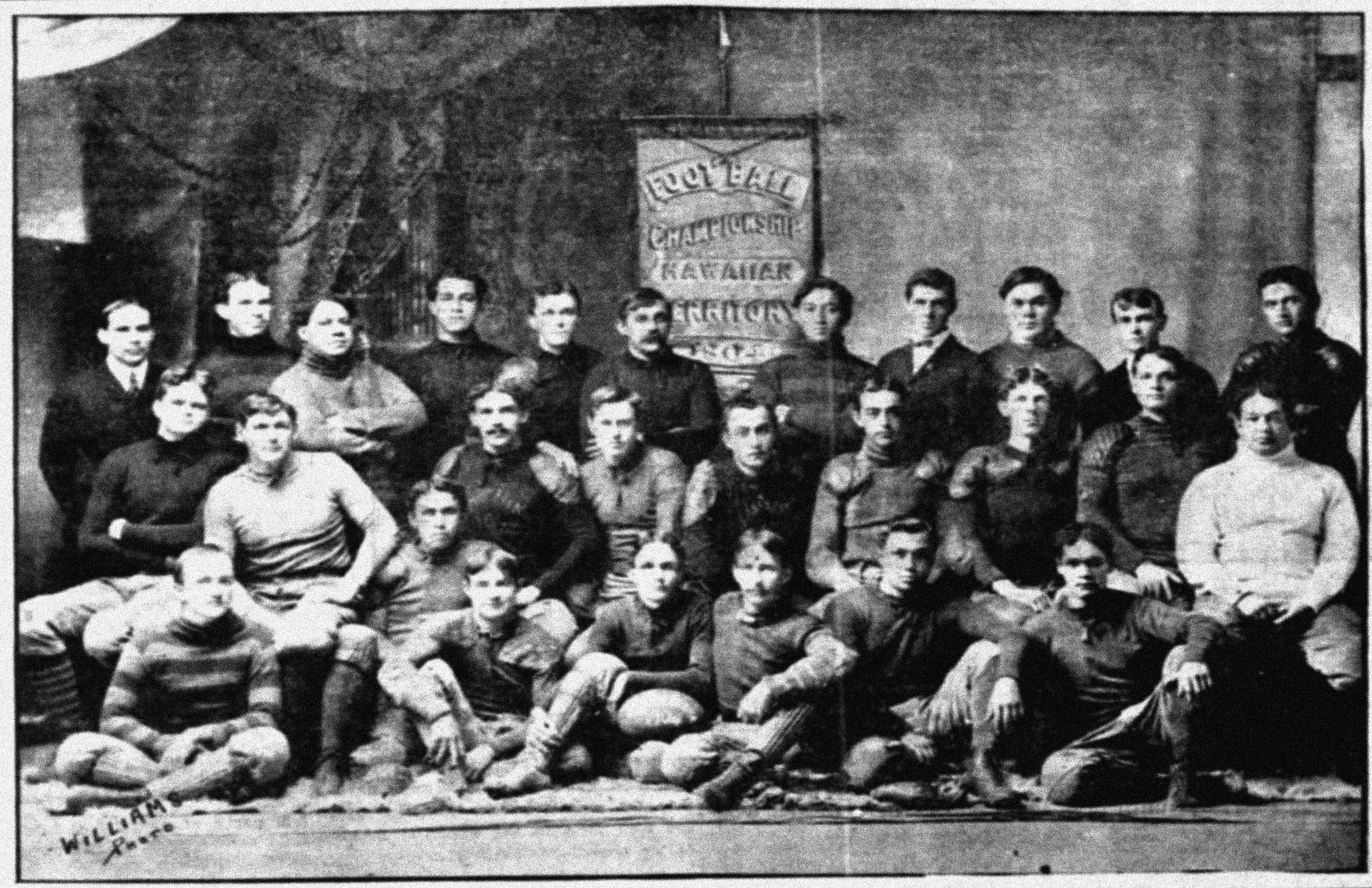
1905 Hawaiian Football Champions. Freeth is sitting in the middle row, fourth from right.

Upon his return to Honolulu in 1899, Freeth attended 'Iolani College (a high school) where he competed in multiple sports for the school. He was the goalie of the soccer team and won the pole vault competition at the end of the year. He worked as a painter at Honolulu Iron Works and played for the company's soccer team. Freeth succeeded in rowing, football, and swimming while in Honolulu and became the champion diver in the Hawaiian islands. He also traveled to Philadelphia to see his older brother Charlie in 1903. While in Philadelphia, Freeth won a diving tournament and freestyle swimming competition while working for the local telephone company.

=== Renewing interest in surfing at Waikiki ===
Freeth returned to Honolulu in 1903 and stayed until 1907. He is credited with renewing the popularity of surfing in Hawai'i during this time. He also continued participating in numerous sports, finding notable success in high diving and freestyle swimming. Freeth was so respected as an athlete that he coached local rowing and swimming clubs. Before Freeth's return to California, he taught surfing in the summer of 1907. Alexander Hume Ford, founder of the Outrigger Canoe Club, learned to surf from Freeth. Freeth also taught writer Jack London, who wrote about the experience in his essay "Riding The South Seas Surf" (1907).

Freeth rose to prominence through his public demonstrations of surfing, diving, and swimming which aimed to attract tourists. The Hawaii Promotion Committee (HPC), formed in 1903 to increase tourism to the islands, played an important role in Freeth's career. In March 1907, the HPC invited the Los Angeles Chamber of Commerce to visit Honolulu, where they observed Freeth performing a diving show at the Hotel Baths. Later that year, Freeth approached the HPC about traveling to California to give surfing exhibitions. The committee believed Freeth was the ideal ambassador to showcase surfing in Los Angeles as he had an Anglo-Hawaiian heritage and mastered the sport. The HPC hoped that surfing would captivate visitors and encourage them to visit or move to Hawai'i. In July 1907, he arrived at Venice Beach to perform surfing exhibitions and to work for the real estate developer Abbot Kinney. His contract was arranged by HPC's representative in Los Angeles, Lloyd Childs.

== Lifeguard contributions ==
=== Heroic Rescue and a Gold Life-Saving Medal ===
When Freeth arrived in Venice in July 1907, the resorts along the Santa Monica Bay were dealing with a serious problem of drownings. Freeth started volunteering with the Venice Volunteering Lifesaving Corps to improve beach safety. Freeth's first stay in Venice was only five months, but he quickly became a respected leader and role model for many of the young lifeguards he trained. As captain of the Venice Life Saving Corps, Freeth ran mock rescues, boat drills, and swimming competitions, even introducing women to swim competitions.

On December 16, 1908, during Freeth's second residence in Venice, he saved seven Japanese fishermen in one afternoon. The fishermen had set sail from Maikura that morning, a fishing village north of Venice. The skies began darkening in the early afternoon. Around 1:30 p.m. a boat containing two Japanese fishermen approached the Venice pier as they tried to get behind the breakwater to avoid the storm waves. Freeth dove over the breakwater and swam out to the fishermen. Once he reached the boat, he rowed them behind the breakwater where volunteers pulled the fisherman to safety. Freeth dove off the pier a second time and swam to two more fishermen in trouble. He climbed aboard their boat, but instead of taking them toward the pier, he guided the boat through the waves, making a safe landing on the beach. Witnesses described him as steering the boat "with a skill that enables the Hawaiians to pilot their surf boards over the breakers."

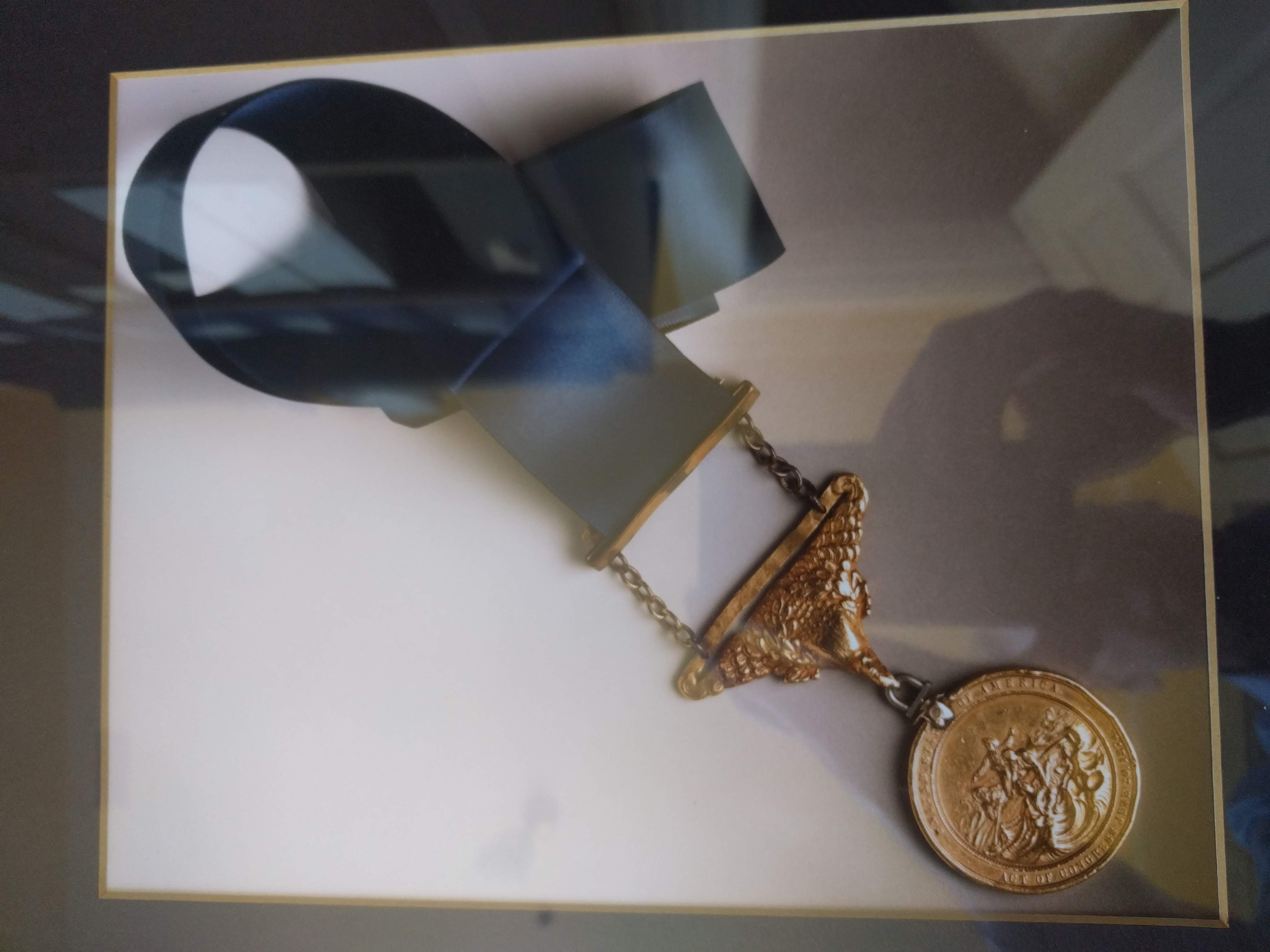
George Freeth's Gold Life Saving Medal

While Freeth was being treated for hypothermia in the lifeguard station, the sirens signaled an additional boat was in trouble. Freeth again dashed to the end of the pier and jumped off, saving the last three men. The rescue played out over nearly two hours, the multiple sirens bringing hundreds of spectators to the shore and pier. Freeth later received a Gold Life-Saving Medal for his heroism. Freeth demonstrated that it was possible to swim through storm waves, rather than only relying on a rowboat, to effectively save lives. His methods became standard practice among lifeguards thereafter.

The obverse of Freeth's gold medal shows rescuers in a small, storm-tossed boat pulling a man from the water, and the legend reads:

                                 UNITED STATES OF AMERICA
                               ACT OF CONGRESS JUNE 20, 1874

The legend on the reverse reads:

 IN TESTIMONY OF HEROIC DEEDS IN SAVING LIFE FROM THE PERILS OF THE SEA

And in the reverse center is inscribed:

 TO GEORGE FREETH FOR HEROICALLY RESCUING SEVEN FISHER-MEN[17]

=== Head lifeguard ===
Freeth's next lifeguarding job was at Ocean Beach in San Diego in the summer of 1918. The city council hired Freeth after thirteen people had drowned in one day (ten of them members of the military). Freeth asked the council to purchase new equipment for the lifeguards: a reel-and-buoy system mounted onto a tripod, and the three-wheeled motorcycle that he had pioneered in Redondo Beach six years before. Freeth also ordered two lifeboats (his favorite was the two-person Swamp Scott Dory): one reserved for rescues and the other as a training vessel. Because Freeth understood that there was a need for more than lifesaving equipment, he put into place a lifeguard training regimen to prepare the lifeguards for various lifesaving emergencies. After Freeth demonstrated his new equipment and training regimen to the city council, they were so impressed with his results that they considered putting him in charge of lifeguards at all the beaches in San Diego. For the rest of the summer of 1918, not a single person drowned at Ocean Beach.

== Surfing contributions ==
When George Freeth traveled to Los Angeles in 1907 to give surfing exhibitions at Venice, he was announced as the “Champion Surf Rider Coming from Honolulu” by local newspapers. He made headlines as far away as San Diego: “George Freeth Responsible for Popularity of an Almost Lost Art—To Teach Californians the Sport.”

Freeth became famous for his surfing skills in the Golden State, giving exhibitions in beach cities in Los Angeles, Orange Country, and the San Diego area. He used surfing to promote the bathhouses and hotels that hired him as a lifeguard and swimming instructor. Freeth also gave surfing lessons to children, teaching them to understand waves and currents, which was crucial knowledge for the development of California Beach Culture.

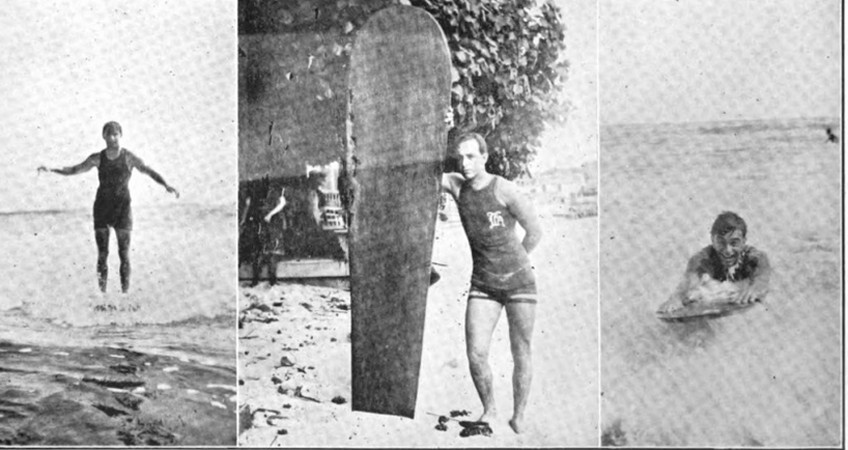
George Freeth surfing, Waikiki 1907

In 1912, Freeth organized California's first official surf club in Redondo Beach. He named it Hui Nalu, after the famous club in Waikiki, which Duke Kahanamoku, the legendary surfer and swimmer, had helped to form. Out of the fourteen founding members in Redondo, six were selected to give their first surfing exhibition in November 1912. They built their own surfboards and Freeth served as their coach.

== Swimming contributions ==
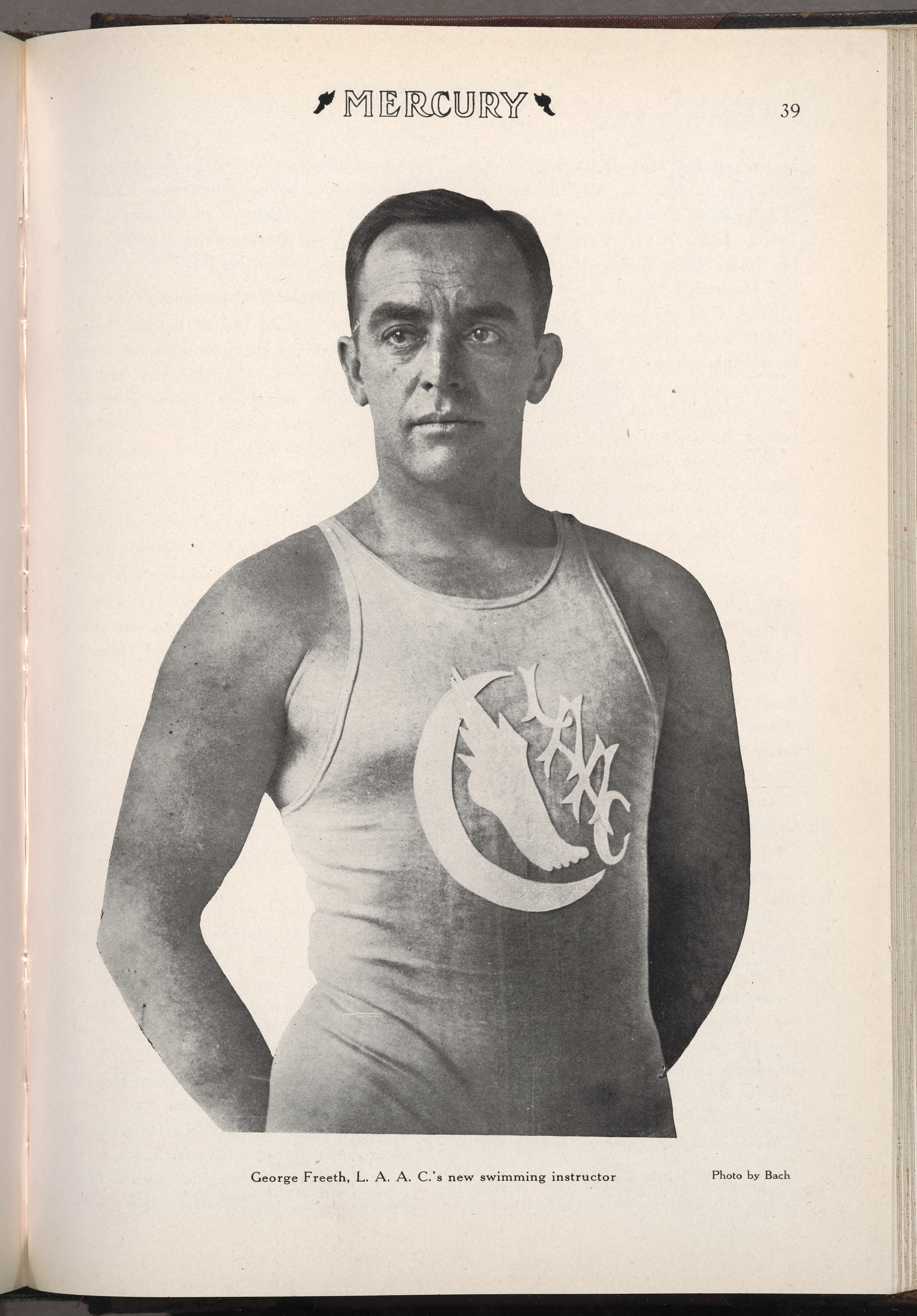
George Freeth as the Head Swimming Coach, Los Angeles Athletic Club

=== Los Angeles Athletic Club ===
Freeth swam competitively and worked as a swim coach throughout his dozen years in California. He started in Venice in 1907 at the Venice bathhouse, then was hired at Henry Huntington's bathhouse in Redondo Beach. He offered private swimming and diving lessons to men, women, and children to supplement his income as a lifeguard. He attempted to try out for the 1908 Olympics in London but was blocked by the Amateur Athletic Union (AAU) because he worked as a professional lifeguard. He tried again in 1912 for the Olympics in Stockholm (as a diver this time) but the AAU once again refused him amateur status. Freeth was then hired as the head swimming instructor at the Los Angeles Athletic Club in 1913, a position he held until February 1915. During his tenure he coached future Olympians Duke Kahanamoku and Ludy Langer.

=== San Diego Rowing Club ===
Freeth accepted a position in July 1916 as the head swimming instructor at the San Diego Rowing Club, working in much the same capacity as he did at the Los Angeles Athletic Club: training swimmers to compete in local, regional, and national events, and offering swimming and diving lessons on the side. His initial contract was for two months with a salary of $75 a month.

The rowing club became affiliated with the AAU at this time and organized the state swimming championships over Labor Day weekend in 1916. Freeth was tasked with preparing the club's swimmers for this event, which club members hoped would increase the visibility of the club on the national stage. The decision to offer Freeth a short-term contract likely stemmed from the club's desire to assess the potential improvements in the swimming program since Freeth's arrival back in July.

The club achieved remarkable success in a short time under Freeth's guidance, his swimmers claiming medals in both indoor and ocean competitions in the region. Freeth also taught his swimmers to surf and used the sport as a promotional tool for the club. Large crowds came to Mission Beach to witness the exhibitions, thus attracting support for the upcoming swim meets. With only two months to prepare, and facing established state powerhouses like the Los Angeles Athletic Club and San Francisco's Olympic Club, Freeth's swimmers came in last place at the state championships. The rowing club decided not to renew his contract in September.

The following year, in 1917, Freeth was rehired part-time by the San Diego Rowing Club to prepare their swimmers for the upcoming Pacific Coast Championships at Coronado over July Fourth. Individual swimmers like Charlie Shields and Elliot Burns managed second-place finishes in their respective events, but once again the rowing club came in last among the more established programs. The United States had entered World War I in late April of that year, another challenge for Freeth in assembling a competitive team since many young men enlisted in the army and navy.

Beyond training amateur competitive swimmers, Freeth also held workshops and lectures for the public to teach them various swimming strokes and basic lifesaving techniques. He also advocated for swimming instruction in public schools. Wherever Freeth lived and worked, he remained an advocate for swimming as a means to prevent the great loss of life due to drowning in bathhouses and beaches.

== Death and legacy ==
=== Flu pandemic ===
Despite his vigorous health from years spent in the surf, Freeth became ill with the flu in the third and final wave of the epidemic. He entered Agnew Hospital and Sanitarium in downtown San Diego on January 15, 1919, where he spent three months fighting the virus. San Diego Rowing Club members Charles Weldon and Richard Barthelmess sent out a call in area newspapers to collect money to help Freeth during his illness. Freeth's condition rapidly deteriorated once he caught pneumonia, a frequently fatal flu complication. He died on April 7, 1919, at the age of 35.

The San Diego Rowing Club held a memorial for Freeth at the Johnson-Saum Funeral Home on April 12, 1919. Six members of the club carried his casket. Former club president Charles E. Sumner presented a eulogy that described Freeth as “a brave, fearless, tender gentleman.” Freeth's success, Sumner stated, was “measured by his courage, his daring, and his heroism. . . measured by the higher and purer qualities of heart and soul.”

Because Freeth's family could not travel to San Diego for the memorial, they asked to have his body cremated and sent to Honolulu. His remains were buried at a public ceremony at Nu’uanu Cemetery in Honolulu on May 4, 1919. He was interred next to his brother, Alexander Rupert Freeth, who had died in 1888 when he was three years old.

The news of Freeth's death carried to the east coast where the New York Tribune described him in an obituary as "a national authority on all branches of watermanship ... Directly, or indirectly, a great number of lives must stand to his credit, for he personally performed frequent rescues, several under such dangerous conditions that they won him medals for bravery. He will prove a sad loss."

=== Waterman Legacy ===
Freeth's "watermanship" became what is known as the waterman tradition in Hawai`i and California where an individual demonstrates mastery of such varied ocean activities as swimming, diving, rowing, and surfing.

Freeth's legacy as a swimming instructor includes teaching female swimmers like Lyba and Nita Sheffield during his time in Venice. The two became physical education instructors and continued Freeth's legacy by writing a book about swimming, Swimming Simplified.

Freeth's legacy in lifeguarding was to pave the way for the foundation of professional lifeguarding service that did not exist at the time of his arrival in California. He pioneered both lifesaving techniques (swimming out to victims in storm waves, as he had done in Venice in 1908) and lifesaving equipment: the torpedo buoy and tripod assembly, and the 3-wheeled lifesaving motorcycle, which is standard lifeguard equipment on beaches around the world today. Freeth taught his lifeguards to surf and to use their knowledge of the waves and currents for more effective rescues. He was reported to have saved between two and three hundred lives during his time in California.

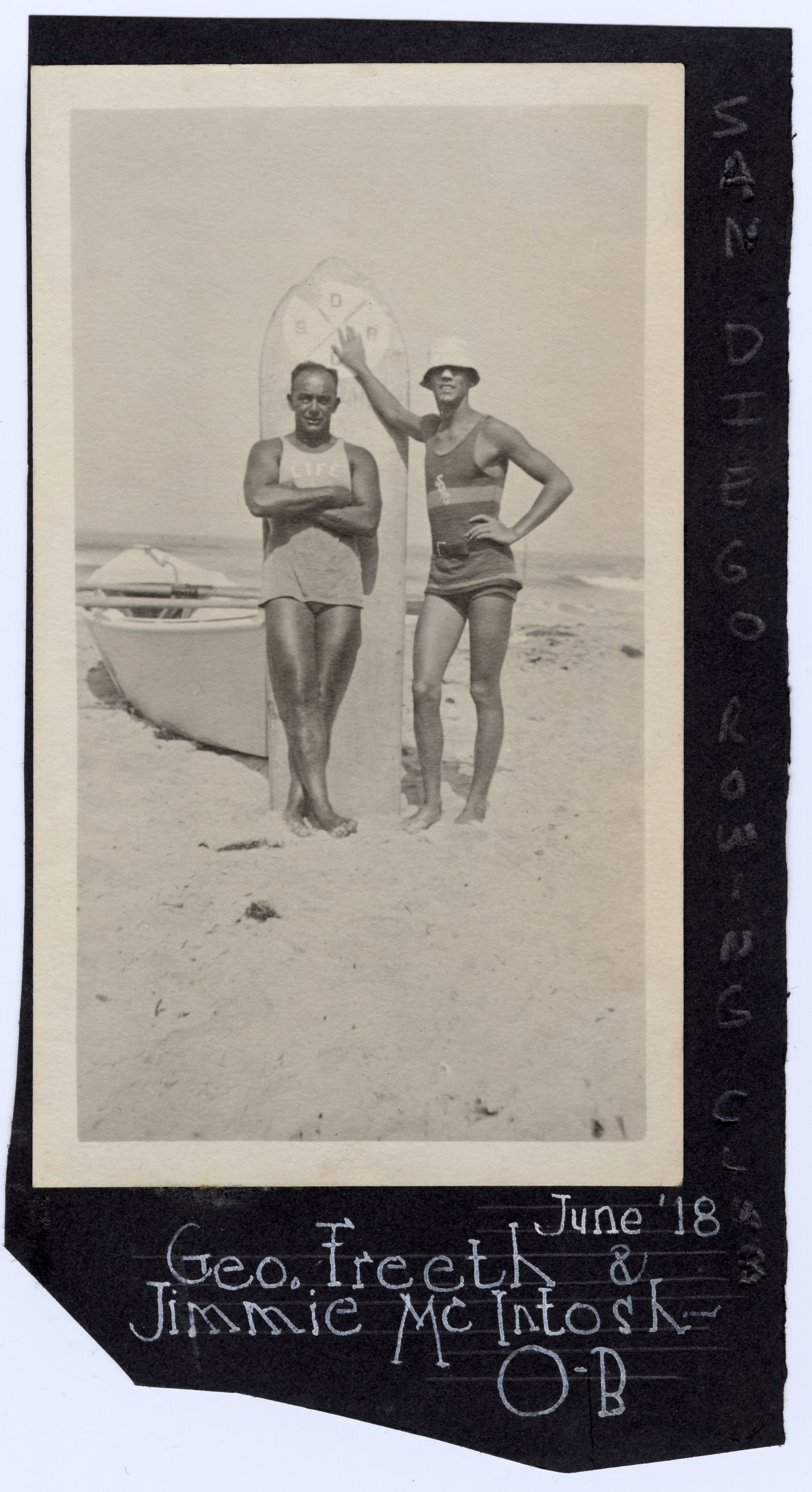
George Freeth (at left) with protege Jimmie McIntosh embodying the California beach lifestyle: healthy, tan and relaxed.

Freeth's legacy in surfing is only second to that of his contributions to lifeguarding. In surfing, Freeth popularized the renewal of an ancient Hawaiian cultural tradition at Waikiki and advocated for a shorter, lighter surfboard than the traditional Hawaiian olo boards (which could weight over a hundred pounds). Freeth's boards were generally 8 feet long, two feet wide, and weighed about 40 pounds. Because the boards were lighter and easier to maneuver, more people were able to surf. Freeth's students, like Santa Monica lifeguard and swimming instructor Frank Holborow, later taught others, and carried on the surfing tradition in California.

=== Contributions overshadowed ===
Despite his many accomplishments, Freeth's legacy is less well known to the public. One reason is because he died young (35 years old). The 1918 Flu Pandemic was drawing to a close at the time, and the United States was in the aftermath of World War I. Both events overshadowed Freeth's death.

Duke Kahanamoku's many accomplishments on the world stage also overshadowed Freeth's accomplishments. Kahanamoku lived much longer than Freeth and became popular due to his gold-medal performances in multiple Olympic Games and his Hollywood career in the 1920s. Kahanamoku became Hawai`i's global ambassador for surfing.

=== Theft of bust ===
On August 11, 2008, a bronze bust of Freeth was stolen from the Redondo Beach Pier. The town had commissioned the sculpture to honor Freeth in 1977, and local sculptor Terry O'Donnell completed the work. On November 7, 2010, Freeth's bust was recast from the original mold and replaced at the pier.
