= Waveriders =

- Directed by: Joel Conroy
- Written by: Joel Conroy; Lauren Davies
- Produced by: Margo Harkin
- Starring: Richie Fitzgerald, Gabe Davies, Kelly Slater, Rabbit Kekai; Chris, Keith & Dan Malloy
- Narrated by: Cillian Murphy
- Cinematography: Daniel Trapp
- Edited by: Douglas Moxon; Nathan Nugent
- Distributed by: Element Pictures Distribution
- Release dates: 22 February 2008 (Dublin Film Festival); 3 April 2009
- Running time: 80 minutes
- Countries: Ireland; United Kingdom
- Language: English

Waveriders is a 2008 documentary film produced by Margo Harkin and directed by Joel Conroy.

== Synopsis ==
Waveriders focuses on the Irish roots of surfing. The film covers the life of Irish-Hawaiian surfer George Freeth and his influence in popularizing surfing in California and his contributions to lifeguarding. It also follows Irish, British and American surfers Richie Fitzgerald, Gabe Davies, Kelly Slater and the Malloy Brothers. The surfers conquer enormous sixty foot waves - the biggest swell to have been ridden off the Irish Atlantic Coast.

Irish surfer Easkey Britton is also featured in the film and was the first female surfer to ride the "big wave", Aill na Searrach off the Cliffs of Moher in 2007.

== Production ==
Director Joel Conroy began planning the film in 2005 when he read about George Freeth in a newspaper. He researched Freeth's background, tracking down his friends and relatives. The film was in development for 3 years; filming was over 2 years. It was shot on 35mm film to give it a vintage feel.

== Reception ==
=== Critical response ===
Rotten Tomatoes gives the film a score of 56% based on reviews from 16 critics.

=== Awards ===
Waveriders won the 2008 Audience Choice Award from the Jameson Dublin International Film Festival, the 2009 Irish Film and Television Awards inaugural George Morrison Feature Documentary Award and the Best Documentary Award at the 2009 SURFER Poll & Video Awards.

Margo Harkin (Producer) and Joel Conroy (Director) were awarded Outstanding Achievement in film making for Waveriders at the 2009 Newport Beach Film Festival.

== See also ==
- Surfing in Ireland
- Surf film
- Cinema of Ireland
