= Szürkület =

1990 Hungarian film

- Directed by: György Fehér
- Written by: György Fehér
- Based on: It Happened in Broad Daylight by Friedrich Dürrenmatt
- Produced by: György Fehér
- Starring: János Derzsi
- Cinematography: Gurbán Miklós
- Edited by: Mária Czeilik
- Music by: László Vidovszky
- Production companies: Budapest Filmstúdió; Magyar Televízió Müvelödési Föszerkesztöség (MTV); Praesens-Film
- Release dates: August 1990 (Locarno); 28 March 1991 (Hungary)
- Running time: 105 minutes
- Country: Hungary
- Language: Hungarian

Twilight (Hungarian: Szürkület) is a 1990 Hungarian crime film directed by György Fehér. Adapted by Fehér, it is a remake of the 1958 German film, It Happened in Broad Daylight, originally written by Swiss author Friedrich Dürrenmatt.

== Summary ==
After discovering the murdered body of a young girl deep in a mountainous forest, a hardened homicide detective pushes himself to increasingly obsessive ends in his quest to catch the serial killer – known only as "The Giant" — responsible for the crime.

== Cast ==
- Péter Haumann as Felügyelõ
- János Derzsi as K.
- Judit Pogány as Overállos nõ

== Release and legacy ==
The film premiered at the 43rd Locarno Film Festival in August 1990, where it won the Bronze Leopard for Milós Gurbán's camerawork. It was screened in the United Kingdom for the first time in 2012. After being unavailable for many years, it was restored in 4K resolution by National Film Institute Hungary. Second Run released the film on Region B Blu-ray in 2023, using this restoration. Theatrical distribution in the United States was by Arbelos Films. Arbelos announced a Blu-ray release for late winter of 2024.

=== Critical reception ===
Zoe Aiano in a review for the East European Film Bulletin wrote that "Despite its imperfections, Twilight is a masterpiece of world-building and tone that draws you in with its ominous allusions and the archetypal but effective use of remote village tropes to play on our darkest fears."

On the review aggregator website Rotten Tomatoes, 93% of 15 critics' reviews are positive. Metacritic, which uses a weighted average, assigned the film a score of 82 out of 100, based on 4 critics, indicating "universal acclaim".
