= Hush-a-Bye Baby =

Northern Irish film

- Directed by: Margo Harkin
- Written by: Margo Harkin; Stephanie English
- Produced by: Tom Collins
- Starring: Emer McCourt; Micheal Liebman; Cathy Casey; Julie Rodgers; Sinéad O'Connor
- Cinematography: Breffini Byrne
- Edited by: Martin Duffy
- Music by: Sinéad O'Connor
- Production companies: Derry Film and Video Workshop; RTÉ; Channel 4
- Release dates: 1989 (Derry); 11 December 1992 (UK)
- Running time: 77 minutes
- Country: United Kingdom
- Language: English

Hush-a-Bye Baby is a 1989 Northern Irish television film directed by Margo Harkin. Set in Derry in 1984, the film tells the story of Goretti Friel, a fifteen-year-old Catholic girl who found herself pregnant during the Troubles.

The film marks the acting debut of Irish singer and songwriter Sinéad O'Connor.

== Plot ==
Goretti, Dinky, Sinéad and Majella are four Catholic teenage girls who have been friends since school. One day, Ciaran, an Irish-speaking, pro-IRA boy, enters their Irish class and falls in love with Goretti. One day, while the two are babysitting for her sister, they have a sexual encounter. The next day, Ciaran is arrested because he is believed to be a member of the IRA, leaving Goretti alone. The following week the girl begins to feel ill and discovers she is pregnant, and to hide it, she begins to burn her sanitary towels and wears larger clothing. When she writes a letter to reveal her status to Ciaran, she discovers that "torrach", the Irish word for "pregnancy", literally means "to bring a family". Because it is written in Irish, the letter is censored and discarded by the prison guards. Depressed and lonely, Goretti decides to travel to the Gaeltacht of County Donegal to visit her ancestors and improve her Irish, accompanied by Dinky. Feeling even worse, she reveals to Dinky that she is pregnant. After returning to Derry, Goretti is finally able to meet Ciaran in prison, but he reacts brusquely and disinterestedly to the news of her pregnancy, infuriating Goretti. The girl attempts an unsafe abortion using alcohol and a hot bath. Back at school, Goretti is unable to tell Sinéad and Majella about her condition, and Majella calls one of her classmates who has had early sexual intercourse a 'slut'. During a class, the English teacher reads "Limbo" by Seamus Heaney, a poem about a mother drowning her baby in the Donegal fishing village of Ballyshannon. The film ends during the Christmas holidays, with Goretti screaming in pain in her bed, attracting the attention of her parents as the statue of Holy Mary placed in front of her begins to anthropomorphize.

== Cast ==
- Emer McCourt as Goretti Friel
- Michael Liebmann as Ciaran
- Cathy Casey as Dinky
- Julie Rodgers as Majella
- Sinéad O'Connor as Sinéad
- David Coyle as Father Devine

== Production ==
The production of the film took place in 1989 and was funded by British television's Channel 4 and Irish public service broadcaster RTÉ.

The premise of the film was inspired by the real stories of fifteen-year-old Ann Lovett, the Kerry Babies case, and the discovery of an abandoned baby in the grotto of Derry's Long Tower Church.

=== Music ===
Margo Harkin asked Irish singer-songwriter Sinéad O'Connor to compose the film's soundtrack but O'Connor was impressed by the script that she wanted to act as well. Initially cast as a nun, she eventually decided to play the small part of Sinéad. An instrumental remix of her "Three Babies" (a song about a series of miscarriages she had at the time) is the theme, while the vocal remix is played during the credits. Commenting on her contribution, O'Connor said:

It was a film that really attracted me because it dealt with something I had first hand experience of - the horror of being young, single and pregnant in a country like Ireland with such backward views on femininity and sexuality.

== Release ==
Harkin explained that the film was the victim of censorship by the "right wing of the republican movement" and that some cinemas refused to show it, while thanks to the funding received, it was possible to broadcast it on television.

== Reception ==
=== Awards ===
Emer McCourt won the Best Actress Award at the 1990 edition of the Locarno Film Festival
