= Lauren Davies =

British novelist and screenwriter

Lauren Davies (née McCrossan) is a British novelist and screenwriter. Her screenwriting credits include the feature documentary Waveriders, which was nominated for a prestigious Grierson Award and was voted one of the Top 50 Irish films of all time in May 2020 by the Irish Times. WAVERIDERS, shot on film and narrated by Cillian Murphy, was awarded the 2008 Dublin International Film Festival Audience Award and was the IFTA winner for best Feature Documentary in 2009 She created the story for the innovative multi-platform game IAMPLAYR, which won the Cannes Gold Lion 2009. She wrote the documentary CLOUD 9 about 11-times world champion surfer, Kelly Slater, for Quiksilver. She has written 7 books, most recently the environmental children's book, LITTLE TURTLE TURNS THE TIDE about ocean plastics, released in 2020. Her last novel 'SWELL' set in the glamorous world of professional surfing was released in 2015 on Amazon. Her first novel SERVE COOL, published by Time Warner, was a top 10 debut novel of the year in 2001. Her novel ANGEL ON AIR was long-listed for "romantic comedy of the year" by the Romantic Novelists' Association in 2003, followed by the novel WATER WINGS set in Ireland. In 2011, Lauren founded LOLA COVE FILMS to develop her own film projects. She produced the award-winning short BEYOND THE SCARS screened on Channel 4, and now works as a screenwriter and producer. Lauren recently worked as the surfing coordinator on the Disney feature ARTEMIS FOWL, directed by Sir Kenneth Branagh. Her debut original screenplay, has been optioned and is currently in development. Lauren is a Trustee of the environmental Charity Surfers Against Sewage.

== Works ==
=== As screenwriter ===
- Waveriders, writer
- IAMPLAYR', story creator and writer of multi-media game incorporating film content
- Cloud 9', writer. television documentary about world champion surfer Kelly Slater
- The Tony Hawk Show', writer, television documentary about pro skateboarder Tony Hawk's show

=== As novelist ===
- Water Wings (as Lauren McCrossan)
- Angel on Air (as Lauren McCrossan)
- Serve Cool (as Lauren McCrossan)
- Cupcake Couture
- Swell

== Personal life ==
Davies is married to former professional big wave surfer and European surf manager for Patagonia Gabe Davies.
