= Born in '45 =

1966 film

- Directed by: Jürgen Böttcher
- Written by: Jürgen Böttcher; Klaus Poche
- Starring: Monika Hildebrand
- Release date: 1966
- Running time: 94 minutes
- Country: East Germany
- Language: German

Born in '45 (German: Jahrgang 45) is a 1966 East German drama film directed by Jürgen Böttcher. It was screened in the Berlinale Classics section of the 65th Berlin International Film Festival.

== Cast ==
- Monika Hildebrand as Lisa
- Rolf Römer as Alfred
- Paul Eichbaum as Mogul
- Holger Mahlich as Hans
- Gesine Rosenberg as Rita
- Walter Stolp as Kaderleiter
- Werner Kanitz as Napoleon
- Ingo Koster as Heinz
- Anita Okon as Sylvi
- Ruth Kommerell as Mutter
- Richard Ruckheim as Opa

== Plot ==
Alfred ("Al"), an auto mechanic and Lisa ("Li"), a pediatric nurse, are a young married couple living in East Berlin during the summer of 1965. Both feel that their relationship is unfulfilling and arrange to get a divorce. While Li dutifully continues her work, Al chaffs under the on-the-job demands of his supervisors. Longing to escape the life-long drudgery his parents endured, he takes a short vacation, briefly rooms with his former motorcycle buddies, and finally moves in with his mother. Al forms a close friendship with the 70-year-old Mogul, a volunteer with the local residential housing commission who is sympathetic to the youngster's personal difficulties. Al's idleness leads to sheer boredom and he returns to his job. Socialist party administrators are troubled by his undisguised disaffection, labeling him a social "skeptic." The plant's political cadre take steps to correct his behavior on and off the job.

== Production ==
“Born in ‘45 is a universal plea for time for personal development and against the stupid and arbitrary division of people into the ‘useful’ and the ‘useless’. This makes it still relevant today."—Film critic Bernd Reinhardt, World Socialist Web Site.

Regarded primarily as a documentary filmmaker, director Böttcher’s Born in ‘45 is the only narrative feature film in his oeuvre.

Film critic Bernd Reinhardt notes that “Böttcher had always wanted to direct features and regarded his documentary work in German Democratic Republic at the beginning of his career as a visual education.”

Born in ‘45 was suppressed before its release when German Democratic Republic “cultural apparatchiks” deemed it a misrepresentation of the East German working classes. With the fall of the GDR and the Honecker regime in 1990, the film received its world premiere at the 65th Berlin International Film Festival.

== Theme ==
Böttcher offers a sympathetic portrayal of disaffected working-class youth at odds with the conformity demanded by post-Stalinist era officials in the GDR of the 1960s, “a tale of the yearning for a different life.” Film critic Bernd Reinhardt writes:

Al’s character is provocative particularly for the party functionaries. It jars with the image of the ideal worker, always striving to fulfill work plans in ‘socialist competition’ and enthusiastically seeking to do even more after his working hours…Al is seen as "a deliberately detached, thoughtless and immature young man, who does his work but then spends his spare time unimaginatively and without any initiative..."

== Style ==
Born in ‘45 owes its stylistic elements to post-war Italian neorealism, “...heavily influenced by 1950s Italian neo-realists…”, and conveying a “tender affection for adolescents, a feeling for the fragility of their emotions, such as one sometimes finds in the films of Vittorio De Sica [and] Luchino Visconti...”

== Sources ==
- Berlinale. 2015. Jahrgang 45 (Born in’45). http://www.berlinale.de/en/archive/jahresarchive/2015/02_programm_2015/02_filmdatenblatt_2015_201520175.html#tab=video25
- Reinhardt, Bernd. 2011. Some cinematic landmarks of the 1960s in Stalinist East Germany. World Socialist Web Site. https://www.wsws.org/en/articles/2011/08/cine-a03.html
