= Joel Conroy =

Irish film director and screenwriter

- Born: Dublin, Ireland
- Occupation: Filmmaker/Screenwriter

Joel Conroy is an Irish filmmaker.

== Film career ==
Joel previously worked with MTV in America and Australia. He made his first surfing documentary Eye of the Storm, which was first screened on RTÉ television in 2002 and in 2009 he wrote and directed his first featured documentary, Waveriders. He began planning the film in 2005 when he read about George Freeth in a newspaper. He researched Freeth's background, tracking down his friends and relatives. The film was in development for 3 years; filming was over 2 years. It was shot on 35 mm film to give it a vintage feel.

== Awards ==
Waveriders won the 2008 Audience Choice Award from the Jameson Dublin International Film Festival, the 2009 Irish Film and Television Awards inaugural George Morrison Feature Documentary Award and the Best Documentary Award at the 2009 SURFER Poll & Video Awards.

Margo Harkin (Producer) and Joel Conroy (Director) were awarded Outstanding Achievement in film making for Waveriders at the 2009 Newport Beach Film Festival.
