= Jürgen Böttcher =

German film director and painter

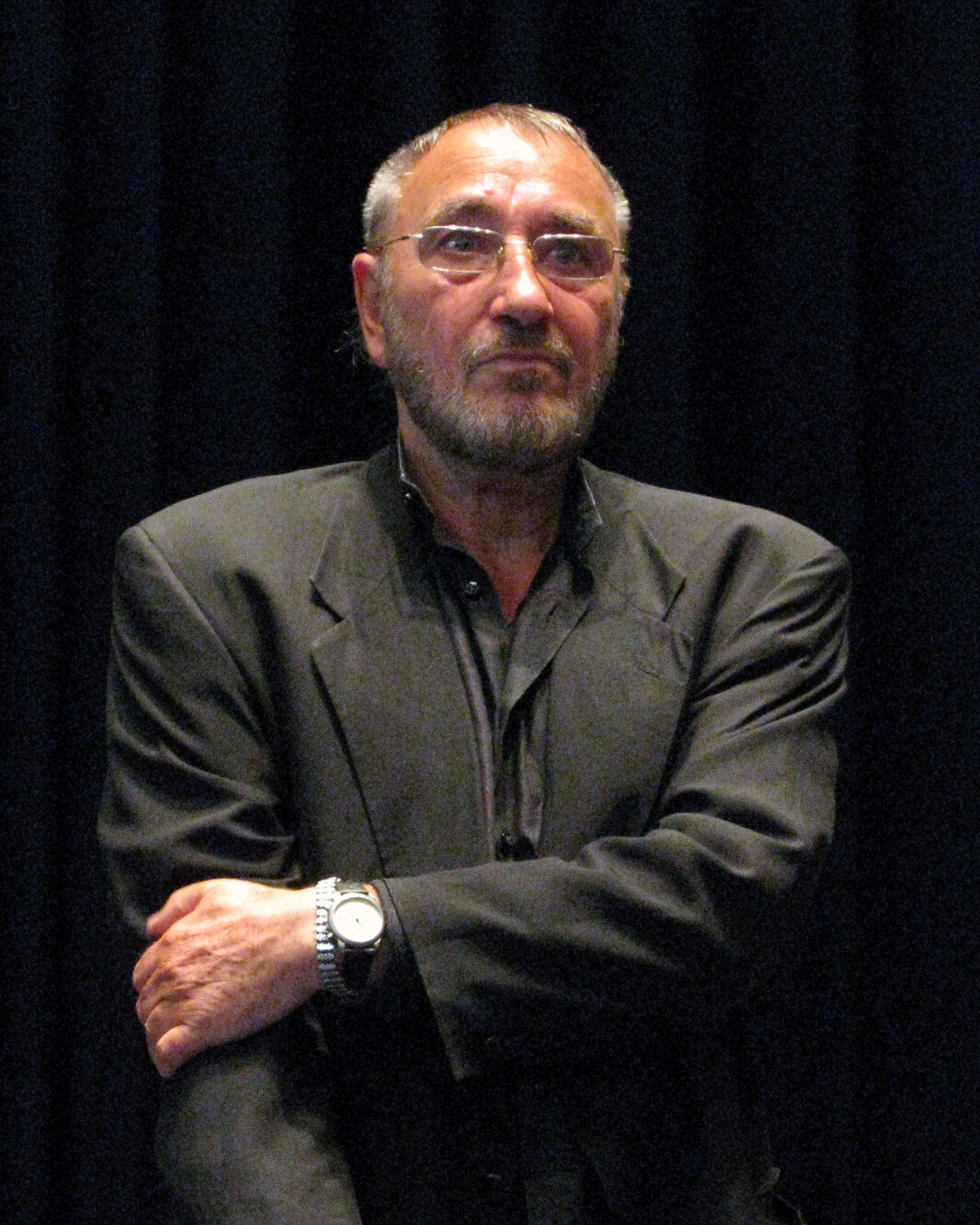
- Born: 8 July 1931 (age 94); Frankenberg, Saxony, Germany
- Occupation: Film director
- Years active: 1957-present

Jürgen Böttcher (pseudonym Strawalde, born 8 July 1931) is a German film director and painter. He is best known for his film Born in '45.

== See also ==
- A. R. Penck
