= Margo Harkin =

Irish filmmaker (born 1951)

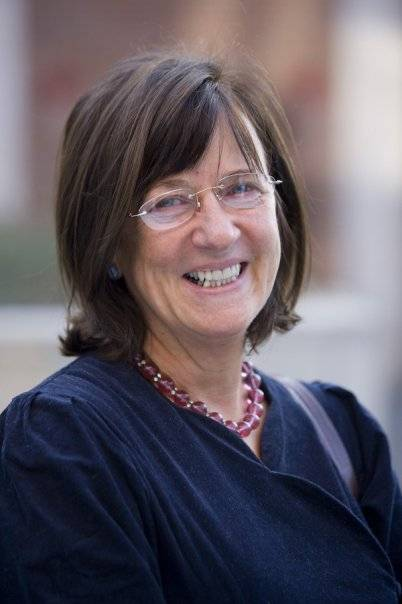
- Margo Harkin
- Born: 2 October 1951 (age 74); Derry, Northern Ireland
- Occupations: Director, Producer, Documentarian
- Years active: 1984–present

Margo Harkin (born October 1951 in Derry) is an Irish filmmaker. Best known for the drama Hush-a-Bye Baby and the documentary Bloody Sunday: A Derry Diary, Harkin produced the surfing documentary Waveriders in 2008.

== Biography ==
Margo Harkin was born in Derry in 1951, one of a family of sixteen children. She was educated at Loreto Convent, Coleraine and at the Ulster College of Art & Design, Belfast, graduating in 1974 with a degree in Fine Arts. After 3 years as an art teacher at a Christian Brothers comprehensive school in Creggan, she worked as an Art Tutor and Deputy Director of the Derry Youth & Community Workshop for unemployed young people. In 1980 she joined Field Day Theatre Company founded by Brian Friel and Stephen Rea and went on to train as a Stage Designer with Percy Harris and Hayden Griffin at Motley Theatre Design Course in London. She designed the Field Day productions of 'The Communication Cord' (1982) by Brian Friel and 'Boesman and Lena' (1983) by Athol Fugard. In 1984 she co-founded Derry Film and Video Workshop, under the Channel 4 franchised workshop scheme.

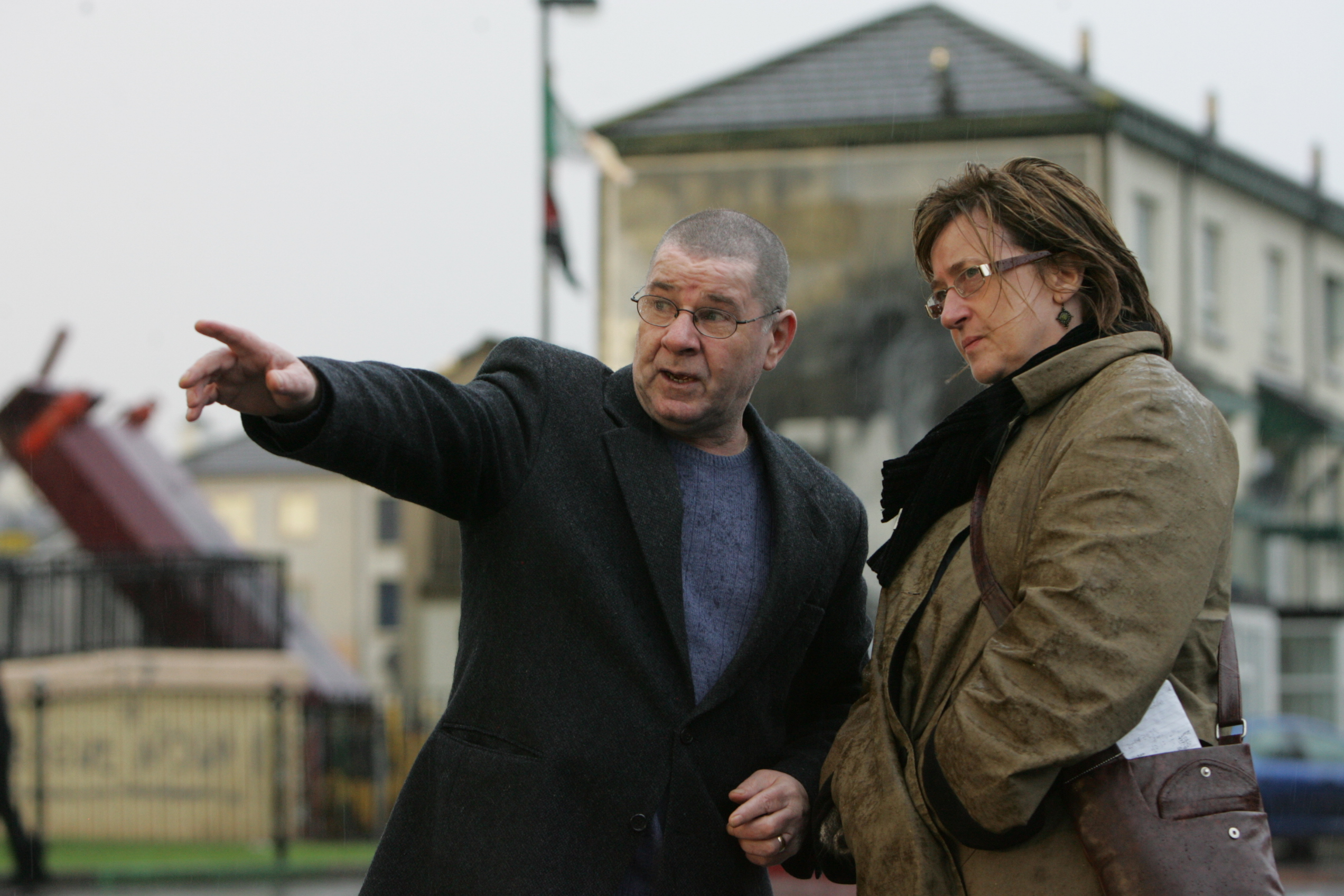
Margo Harkin and James Nash while filming Bloody Sunday: A Derry Diary.

After producing the banned documentary Mother Ireland in 1988, Harkin co-wrote and directed her first drama, Hush-a-Bye Baby (1990), which won "Best Drama" at the International Celtic Film Festival the first of several international awards including The Ecumenical Jury Award at the Locarno Film Festival 1990. The film was selected as the Irish entry for Young European Film of the Year 1990. A groundbreaking drama focusing on teen pregnancy in Northern Ireland, its score was written by singer Sinéad O'Connor, who also made a cameo appearance in the film. In 1992 Harkin founded Besom Productions Ltd., producing a range of genres from television education programmes to drama but she is best known as a chronicler of key periods of the conflict in Northern Ireland.

Her documentary 'The Hunger Strike', in co-production with Joel Conroy of Inis Films, was made for the 25th anniversary of the 1981 Irish Hunger Strike and received record viewing figures when broadcast on BBC Northern Ireland. Over a twelve-year stretch from 1998 to 2010, Harkin filmed 'Bloody Sunday-A Derry Diary' a deeply personal documentary following the Tribunal of Inquiry into Bloody Sunday from the perspective of local people profoundly affected by the original events in addition to addressing Harkin's own experiences on Bloody Sunday. Though an initial cut of the film was screened on ZDF, Arte and RTÉ in 2007, Harkin considered it a 'work in progress' and returned to complete the film when the Report of the Saville Inquiry was released on 15 June 2010. The final cut aired on the RTÉ on 24 June 2010. In a change of direction Harkin produced the feature documentary 'Waveriders' (2008) directed by Joel Conroy in co-production with Inis Films, about surfing in Ireland. At its premiere at the Dublin Film Festival in 2008 it won the Audience Award and later the IFTA George Morrison Award for Best Irish Feature Documentary. Shot entirely on 16mm film it had a successful theatrical release in Ireland/UK in 2009 and is currently being distributed worldwide.

== Filmography ==
=== Director ===
- Hush-a-Bye Baby (1989)
- The Bloody Sunday Murders (1991)
- NYPD Nude (1995)
- Songs & Sounds by Leaps & Bounds (Also Producer; 1996)
- Down to Earth (1997)
- 12 Days in July (Also Producer; 1997)
- Clear the Stage (1998)
- A Plague on Both Your Houses (Also Producer; 1999)
- Looking for Lundy (Also Producer; 2000)
- Young@Heart (Also Producer; 2001)
- You Looking at Me? (Also Producer; 2003)
- Ocras (Also Co-Producer; 2006)
- The Hunger Strike (Also Co-Producer; 2006)
- Bloody Sunday: A Derry Diary (Also Producer; 1986 - Revised Cut, 2007 - Second Cut, 2010 - Final Cut)

=== Producer ===
- Mother Ireland (1988)
- Fatal Extraction (1998)
- At the Cutting Edge (2001)
- Coola Boola (2001)
- The Last Storyteller? (2002)
- Seeking Filipino Bride (2003)
- Unfaithful (2004)
- A Dog's Life (2004)
- Rua (2007)
- Waveriders (2008)
- Paradiso (2009)
- For Queen and Country (2010)
- Grey FM (2010)
- Sisters of the Lodge (2011)

== Further Resources ==
- Barton, Ruth. Issues and Debates in Contemporary Cinema. Irish National Cinema. London: Routledge, 2004.
- Cullingford, Elizabeth Butler. "Seamus and Sinead: From "Limbo" to Saturday Night Live by way of Hush-a-Bye Baby." Colby Quarterly 30.1 March 1994. 43-62. Available at: http://digitalcommons.colby.edu/cq/vol30/iss1/7
- Conrad, Kathryn. "Fetal Ireland: National Bodies and Political Agency." Éire-Ireland XXXVI.3-4 (Fall/Winter 2001) 153-173.
- Conrad, Kathryn. Locked in the Family Cell: Gender, Sexuality, and Political Agency in Irish National Discourse. Irish Literature and Culture Series, ed. Michael Patrick Gillespie. Madison: University of Wisconsin Press, 2004.
- Emerman, Marsha. "Derry Film & Video: An Interview with Margo Harkin." Cineaste: America's Leading Magazine on the Art and Politics of the Cinema 17.2 (1989): 43.
- Farley, Fidelma. "Interrogating Myths of Maternity in Irish Cinema: Margo Harkin's Hush-a-Bye Baby." Irish University Review 29.2 (1999): 219-237.
- Gibbons, Luke. "On the Beach: Abortion and Divorce in Irish Cinema." Artforum 31.2 (1992), 13.
- Harkin, Margo. "Broadcasting in a Divided Community." Ed Martin McLoone. Culture, Identity and Broadcasting in Ireland: Local Issues, Global Perspectives. Belfast: Institute of Irish Studies, 1991. 110-117.
- Harkin, Margo. "Open Forum: What is to be Done?" Ed Martin McLoone. Culture, Identity and Broadcasting in Ireland: Local Issues, Global Perspectives. Belfast: Institute of Irish Studies, 1991. 139-156.
- Kirkland, Richard. "Gender, Nation, Excess: Reading Hush-a-bye Baby." In Ireland in Proximity: History, Gender, Space. London: Routledge. 1999. 109-121.
- Murphy, P. "Hush-a-bye Baby": An Interview with Margo Harkin and Stephanie English. Film Base News 16 (February–March 1990), 8-10.
- Sullivan, Megan. "From Nationalism to 'Baby X': An Interview with Northern Irish Filmmaker Margo Harkin." Éire-Ireland: A Journal of Irish Studies 32.2-3 (1997): 40-51.
- White, G. S. "'Hush a Bye Baby'." Canadian Woman Studies/Les Cahiers de la Femme 17.3 (1997): 73-75.
