= György Fehér =

Hungarian film director

- Born: 12 February 1939; Budapest, Hungary
- Died: 15 July 2002 (aged 63); Budapest, Hungary
- Occupations: Film director Screenwriter
- Years active: 1973-2002

György Fehér (12 February 1939 – 15 July 2002) was a Hungarian film director and screenwriter. His film Szenvedély was screened in the Un Certain Regard section at the 1998 Cannes Film Festival. He was also a producer on Béla Tarr's seven-hour film Sátántangó.

== Biography ==
Between 1985 and 1994, Fehér taught at the Academy of Theatre and Film Arts. From 1959, he worked for a year and a half at the Radio, then at Hungarian Television as a sound technician and then as an assistant cameraman. After graduating, he worked as a cinematographer and director for Hungarian Television from 1975 to 2001.

In 1972, he graduated from the Academy of Theatre and Film Arts, majoring in directing and cinematography. Between 1980 and 1982, he was artistic director of the Móricz Zsigmond Theatre in Nyíregyháza. He appeared in several films, including Miklós Jancsó: The Season of Monsters, Blue Danube Waltz, The Lord Gave Me a Lantern in Peste, Gyula Maár: Cloud Play, Károly Makk: You Have to Play, Géza Bereményi: The Apprentices, Károly Makk: Love. He is an outstanding figure in Hungarian film history. His five films won prizes at the Veszprém TV Festival: Shakespeare: Richard III in 1975, Volpone in 1976, Barrabás in 1979, The School of Women in 1985, while his film Revenge won the Best Director prize in 1978.

He is also credited with the television adaptation of Attila József's poems and his life: The József Attila Poems (1981), a nineteen-part documentary about József, Be Foolish - An Evening with Attila József with Hobo (1981–83), and Attila József: A List of Free Ideas in Two Sittings with Tamás Jordán (1992).

His first feature film, Szürkület (Twilight) (1990), won a special prize at the XXII Hungarian Film Festival and various awards at international festivals such as Locarno and Strasbourg. His film Sense of Death won the Grand Jury Prize for Feature, Experimental and Short Films, the Best Director Award, the Best Actor and Actress Award, the Cinematography Award and the Gene Moskowitz Award from foreign critics at the XXIX Hungarian Film Festival.

in 1996 he published Cyclopedia Anatomicae, an artistic reference book for human and animal anatomy with 1500 illustrations. He later published two more books on human and horse anatomy.

At the National Theatre in Miskolc, Fehér helmed two plays starring Ági Olasz: Rainer Werner Fassbinder's The Bitter Tears of Petra von Kant in 1998 and Edward Albee's Who's Afraid of Virginia Woolf? in 2000. In 1999, he directed the opera Leonce and Lena by János Vajda and George Büchner at the Hungarian State Opera House.

== Filmography ==
- III. Richárd (1973)
- Volpone (1974)
- Rejtekhely (1978)
- Nevelésügyi sorozat I. (1989)
- Szürkület (1990)
- Szenvedély (1998)
