= Swimming at the 1920 Summer Olympics – Men's 1500 metre freestyle =

Men's 1500 metre freestyle at the Games of the VII Olympiad
- Venue: Stade Nautique d'Antwerp
- Dates: 22–23 August 1920 (heats); 24 August 1920 (semifinals); 25 August 1920 (final)
- Competitors: 23 from 12 nations
- Teams: 12
- Winning time: 22:23.2

Medalists
1st place, gold medalist(s)		Norman Ross	United States
2nd place, silver medalist(s)		George Vernot	Canada
3rd place, bronze medalist(s)		Frank Beaurepaire	Australia

The men's 1500 metre freestyle was a swimming event held as part of the swimming at the 1920 Summer Olympics programme. It was the third appearance of the event.

A total of 23 swimmers from 12 nations competed in the event, which was held from Sunday, August 22 to Wednesday, August 25, 1920.

== Records ==
These were the standing world and Olympic records (in minutes) prior to the 1920 Summer Olympics.

World record	22:00.0	(Canada) George Hodgson	Stockholm (SWE)	July 10, 1912
Olympic record	22:00.0	(Canada) George Hodgson	Stockholm (SWE)	July 10, 1912

== Results ==
=== Quarterfinals ===
The fastest two in each heat and the fastest third-placed from across the heats advanced.

Heat 1

Place	Swimmer	Time	Qual.
1	George Vernot (CAN)	23:40.0	Q
2	Eugene Bolden (USA)	23:41.2	Q
3	Arne Borg (SWE)	23:54.4	q
—	René Ricolfi-Doria (SUI)	DNF	
—	Henry Taylor (GBR)	DNF	

Heat 2

Place	Swimmer	Time	Qual.
1	Ludy Langer (USA)	24:28.8	Q
2	Edward Peter (GBR)	24:39.4	Q
3	Cor Zegger (NED)	24:58.0	
4	Antonio Quarantotto (ITA)		
5	Alois Hrášek (TCH)		

Heat 3

Place	Swimmer	Time	Qual.
1	Harold Annison (GBR)	24:28.2	Q
2	George Hodgson (CAN)	24:36.6	Q
3	Gilio Bisagno (ITA)	25:18.0	
4	Hans Drexler (SUI)		
5	Emanuel Prüll (TCH)		

Heat 4

Place	Swimmer	Time	Qual.
1	Norman Ross (USA)	24:08.2	Q
2	Paul De Backer (BEL)	26:46.4	Q
3	Frans Möller (SWE)	27:42.0	
4	Joaquín Cuadrada (ESP)		

Heat 5

Place	Swimmer	Time	Qual.
1	Frank Beaurepaire (AUS)	22:55.0	Q
2	Fred Kahele (USA)	23:41.6	Q
3	Jack Hatfield (GBR)	23:56.6	
—	Pierre Lavraie (FRA)	DNF	

=== Semifinals ===
The fastest two in each semi-final and the faster of the two third-placed swimmer advanced to the final.

Semifinal 1

Place	Swimmer	Time	Qual.
1	Norman Ross (USA)	23:12.0	Q
2	Fred Kahele (USA)	23:23.0	Q
3	Eugene Bolden (USA)	23:26.4	q
4	Arne Borg (SWE)		
5	George Hodgson (CAN)		

Semifinal 2

Place	Swimmer	Time	Qual.
1	George Vernot (CAN)	22:59.4	Q
2	Frank Beaurepaire (AUS)	23:02.2	Q
3	Harold Annison (GBR)	23:51.4	
4	Ludy Langer (USA)		
5	Edward Peter (GBR)		
6	Paul De Backer (BEL)		

=== Final ===
Place	Swimmer	Time
1	Norman Ross (USA)	22:23.2
2	George Vernot (CAN)	22:36.4
3	Frank Beaurepaire (AUS)	23:04.0
4	Fred Kahele (USA)	23:59.1
5	Eugene Bolden (USA)	24:04.3

== Notes ==
- Belgium Olympic Committee (1957). Olympic Games Antwerp 1920: Official Report (in French).
- Wudarski, Pawel (1999). "Wyniki Igrzysk Olimpijskich" (in Polish).
