= Australia at the 1920 Summer Olympics =

- IOC code: AUS
- NOC: Australian Olympic Council
- Website: www.olympics.com.au

in Antwerp
- Competitors: 13 (12 men, 1 woman) in 4 sports
- Medals Ranked 16th: Gold 0 Silver 2 Bronze 1 Total 3

Summer Olympics appearances (overview)
- 1896; 1900; 1904; 1908; 1912; 1920; 1924; 1928; 1932; 1936; 1948; 1952; 1956; 1960; 1964; 1968; 1972; 1976; 1980; 1984; 1988; 1992; 1996; 2000; 2004; 2008; 2012; 2016; 2020; 2024

Other related appearances
- 1906 Intercalated Games –––– Australasia (1908–1912)

Australia competed at the 1920 Summer Olympics in Antwerp, Belgium. Australian athletes have competed in every Summer Olympic Games.

A brother and sister combination swam for Australia, Frank and Lily Beaurepaire.

== Medalists ==
Medal	Name	Sport	Event	Date
Silver	George Parker	Athletics	Men's 3000 m walk	August 21
Silver	Frank Beaurepaire, Harry Hay; William Herald, Ivan Stedman	Swimming	Men's 4 × 200 m freestyle relay	August 29
Bronze	Frank Beaurepaire	Swimming	Men's 1500 m freestyle	August 25

== Aquatics ==
=== Diving ===
One diver represented Australia in 1920. It was the nation's debut in the sport. Beaurepaire finished fourth in her semifinal group in the 10 metre platform, just outside the top three needed to qualify for the final.

Women

Ranks given are within the semifinal group.

Diver	Event	Semifinals			Final		
Diver	Event	Points	Score	Rank	Points	Score	Rank
Lily Beaurepaire	10 m platform	19	147.5	4	did not advance		

=== Swimming ===
Six swimmers, including one woman, represented Australia in 1920. It was the nation's second independent appearance in the sport. All five of the men were involved in the silver medal-winning relay team, though Kirkland is not credited with a medal by the IOC; he was replaced by Frank Beaurepaire after the semifinals. Beaurepaire won an individual bronze in the 1500 metres; his sister Lily was unable to advance to the finals in either of her events as Australia's sole female swimmer.

Ranks given are within the heat.

Men

Swimmer	Event	Quarterfinals		Semifinals		Final	
Swimmer	Event	Result	Rank	Result	Rank	Result	Rank
Frank Beaurepaire	400 m free	5:42.0	3 q	5:32.8	3 q	did not finish	
Frank Beaurepaire	1500 m free	22:55.0	1 Q	23:02.0	2 Q	23:04.0	3rd place, bronze medalist(s)
Harry Hay	100 m free	1:06.8	2 Q	Unknown	6	did not advance	
Harry Hay	400 m free	Unknown	4	did not advance			
William Herald	100 m free	1:08.8	2 Q	1:05.8	3 q	1:03.8	4
Keith Kirkland	100 m free	1:08.0	2 Q	Unknown	6	did not advance	
Keith Kirkland	400 m free	6:12.2	2 Q	did not finish		did not advance	
Ivan Stedman	100 m free	1:04.2	2 Q	Unknown	4	did not advance	
Ivan Stedman	200 m breast	3:18.8	2 Q	3:16.0	3 q	Unknown	5
Frank Beaurepaire; Harry Hay; William Herald; Ivan Stedman; Keith Kirkland	4 × 200 m free relay	N/A		10:23.0	2 Q	10:25.4	2nd place, silver medalist(s)

Women

Swimmer	Event	Semifinals		Final	
Swimmer	Event	Result	Rank	Result	Rank
Lily Beaurepaire	100 m free	Unknown	6	did not advance	
Lily Beaurepaire	300 m free	Unknown	5	did not advance	

== Athletics ==
Four athletes represented Australia in 1920. It was the nation's fourth appearance in the sport. Parker's silver medal in the short racewalk was the nation's first medal since 1900.

Ranks given are within the heat.

Athlete	Event	Heats		Quarterfinals		Semifinals		Final	
Athlete	Event	Result	Rank	Result	Rank	Result	Rank	Result	Rank
Sinton Hewitt	10000 m	N/A					10	did not advance	
Sinton Hewitt	Marathon	N/A						3:03:27.0	30
William Hunt	100 m	11.0	1 Q	11.0	4	did not advance			
William Hunt	200 m	23.5	2 Q	22.4	4	did not advance			
Wilfred Kent-Hughes	110 m hurdles	N/A			4	did not advance			
Wilfred Kent-Hughes	400 m hurdles	N/A		57.2	1 Q	56.9	5	did not advance	
George Parker	3 km walk	N/A				13:47.9	2 Q	13:19.6	2nd place, silver medalist(s)
George Parker	10 km walk	N/A				47:31.0	3 Q	Disqualified	

== Cycling ==
Two cyclists represented Australia in 1920. It was the nation's debut in the sport. Halpin advanced to the semifinals in the sprint, while King was eliminated in the heats. King also competed in the 50 kilometres, but did not finish.

=== Track cycling ===
Ranks given are within the heat.

Cyclist	Event	Heats		Quarterfinals		Repechage semis		Repechage final		Semifinals		Final	
Cyclist	Event	Result	Rank	Result	Rank	Result	Rank	Result	Rank	Result	Rank	Result	Rank
Gerald Halpin	Sprint	12.6	1 Q	12.6	1 Q	Qualified directly				15.2	3	did not advance	
Jack King	Sprint	Unknown	3	did not advance									
Jack King	50 km	N/A										did not finish	

== Tennis ==
A single tennis player competed for Australia in 1920. It was the nation's second appearance in the sport.

Player	Event	Round of 64	Round of 32	Round of 16	Quarterfinals	Semifinals	Finals	Rank
Player	Event	Opposition Score	Opposition Score	Opposition Score	Opposition Score	Opposition Score	Opposition Score	Rank
Ronald Thomas	Men's singles	Bye	Washer (BEL); L 6–1, 6–3, 3–6, 6–4	did not advance				17

Opponent nation	Wins	Losses	Percent
Belgium	0	1	.000
Total	0	1	.000

Round	Wins	Losses	Percent
Round of 64	0	0	–
Round of 32	0	1	.000
Round of 16	0	0	–
Quarterfinals	0	0	–
Semifinals	0	0	–
Final	0	0	–
Bronze match	0	0	–
Total	0	1	.000

== Bibliography ==
- Belgium Olympic Committee (1957). Olympic Games Antwerp 1920: Official Report (in French).
- Wudarski, Pawel (1999). "Wyniki Igrzysk Olimpijskich" (in Polish).
- International Olympic Committee results database
- Australian Olympic Committee Archived 2006-08-25 at the Wayback Machine
- sports-reference
