= Swimming at the 1920 Summer Olympics – Men's 400 metre freestyle =

Men's 400 metre freestyle at the Games of the VII Olympiad
- Venue: Stade Nautique d'Antwerp
- Dates: August 26–28
- Competitors: 22 from 11 nations

Medalists
1st place, gold medalist(s)		Norman Ross	United States
2nd place, silver medalist(s)		Ludy Langer	United States
3rd place, bronze medalist(s)		George Vernot	Canada

The men's 400 metre freestyle was a swimming event held as part of the swimming at the 1920 Summer Olympics programme. It was the third appearance of the event.

A total of 22 swimmers from 11 nations competed in the event, which was held from Thursday, August 26 to Saturday, August 28, 1920.

== Records ==
These were the standing world and Olympic records (in minutes) prior to the 1920 Summer Olympics.

World record	5:14.6	(United States) Norman Ross	Los Angeles (USA)	October 9, 1919
Olympic record	5:24.4	(Canada) George Hodgson	Stockholm (SWE)	July 14, 1912

== Results ==
=== Quarterfinals ===
The fastest two in each heat and the fastest third-placed from across the heats advanced.

Heat 1

Place	Swimmer	Time	Qual.
1	Norman Ross (USA)	6:16.2	Q
2	Kenkichi Saito (JPN)	6:16.8	Q

Heat 2

Place	Swimmer	Time	Qual.
1	Harold Annison (GBR)	5:58.0	Q
2	Keith Kirkland (AUS)	6:12.2	Q
3	Paul Vasseur (FRA)	6:30.4	
4	Alfred Steen (NOR)	6:30.6	
5	René Ricolfi-Doria (SUI)		

Heat 3

Place	Swimmer	Time	Qual.
1	Bill Harris (USA)	5:57.8	Q
2	Henry Taylor (GBR)	6:01.2	Q
3	Masayoshi Uchida (JPN)	6:40.0	
4	Alois Hrášek (TCH)		

Heat 4

Place	Swimmer	Time	Qual.
1	George Vernot (CAN)	5:32.6	Q
2	Fred Kahele (USA)	5:37.4	Q
3	Frank Beaurepaire (AUS)	5:42.0	q
4	Arne Borg (SWE)		
5	Edward Peter (GBR)		
6	Gilio Bisagno (ITA)		

Heat 5

Place	Swimmer	Time	Qual.
1	Ludy Langer (USA)	5:41.1	Q
2	George Hodgson (CAN)	5:49.8	Q
3	Jack Hatfield (GBR)	5:50.6	
4	Henry Hay (AUS)		
5	Antonio Quarantotto (ITA)		

=== Semifinals ===
The fastest two in each semi-final and the faster of the two third-placed swimmer advanced to the final.

Semifinal 1

Place	Swimmer	Time	Qual.
1	Norman Ross (USA)	5:33.8	Q
2	Fred Kahele (USA)	5:35.8	Q
3	Bill Harris (USA)	5:36.0	
4	Henry Taylor (GBR)		
—	Kenkichi Saito (JPN)	DNF	

Semifinal 2

Place	Swimmer	Time	Qual.
1	George Vernot (CAN)	5:27.8	Q
2	Ludy Langer (USA)	5:29.2	Q
3	Frank Beaurepaire (AUS)	5:32.8	q
4	George Hodgson (CAN)		
5	Harold Annison (GBR)		
—	Keith Kirkland (AUS)	DNF	

=== Final ===
Place	Swimmer	Time
1	Norman Ross (USA)	5:26.8
2	Ludy Langer (USA)	5:29.0
3	George Vernot (CAN)	5:29.6
4	Fred Kahele (USA)	
—	Frank Beaurepaire (AUS)	DNF

== Notes ==
- Belgium Olympic Committee (1957). Olympic Games Antwerp 1920: Official Report (in French). Archived from the original on 22 May 2008.
- Wudarski, Pawel (1999). "Wyniki Igrzysk Olimpijskich" (in Polish).
- sports-reference
