= Swimming at the 1920 Summer Olympics =

Swimming at the Games of the VII Olympiad
- Venue: Stade Nautique d'Antwerp
- Dates: 22–29 August 1920
- No. of events: 10
- Competitors: 116 from 19 nations

At the 1920 Summer Olympics in Antwerp, ten swimming events were contested. The women's 300 metre freestyle event was new since the previous Games in 1912. The competitions were held from Sunday August 22, 1920, to Sunday August 29, 1920. There was a total of 116 participants from 19 countries competing.

== Medal table ==
* Host nation (Belgium)

Rank	Nation	Gold	Silver	Bronze	Total
1	United States	8	5	3	16
2	Sweden	2	2	1	5
3	Australia	0	1	1	2
3	Canada	0	1	1	2
3	Great Britain	0	1	1	2
6	Finland	0	0	2	2
7	Belgium	0	0	1	1
Totals (7 entries)		10	10	10	30

== Medal summary ==
=== Men's events ===
Games	Gold	Silver	Bronze
100 m freestyle	Duke Kahanamoku; United States	Pua Kealoha; United States	Bill Harris; United States
400 m freestyle	Norman Ross; United States	Ludy Langer; United States	George Vernot; Canada
1500 m freestyle	Norman Ross; United States	George Vernot; Canada	Frank Beaurepaire; Australia
100 m backstroke	Warren Kealoha; United States	Ray Kegeris; United States	Gérard Blitz; Belgium
200 m breaststroke	Håkan Malmrot; Sweden	Thor Henning; Sweden	Arvo Aaltonen; Finland
400 m breaststroke	Håkan Malmrot; Sweden	Thor Henning; Sweden	Arvo Aaltonen; Finland
4 × 200 m freestyle relay	United States; Duke Kahanamoku; Pua Kealoha; Perry McGillivray; Norman Ross	Australia; Frank Beaurepaire; Henry Hay; William Herald; Ivan Stedman	Great Britain; Harold Annison; Edward Peter; Leslie Savage; Henry Taylor

=== Women's events ===
Games	Gold	Silver	Bronze
100 m freestyle	Ethelda Bleibtrey; United States	Irene Guest; United States	Frances Schroth; United States
300 m freestyle	Ethelda Bleibtrey; United States	Margaret Woodbridge; United States	Frances Schroth; United States
4 × 100 m freestyle relay	United States; Ethelda Bleibtrey; Irene Guest; Frances Schroth; Margaret Woodbridge	Great Britain; Hilda James; Constance Jeans; Grace McKenzie; Charlotte Radcliffe	Sweden; Aina Berg; Jane Gylling; Emily Machnow; Carin Nilsson

== Participating nations ==
A total of 116 swimmers (92 men and 24 women) from 19 nations (men from 17 nations - women from 9 nations) competed at the Antwerp Games:

- Australia (6) (men:5 women:1)
- Belgium (12) (men:11 women:1)
- Brazil (2) (men:2 women:0)
- Canada (3) (men:3 women:0)
- Czechoslovakia (4) (men:4 women:0)
- Finland (1) (men:1 women:0)
- France (13) (men:10 women:3)
- Great Britain (18) (men:12 women:6)
- Italy (4) (men:4 women:0)
- Japan (2) (men:2 women:0)
- Luxembourg (2) (men:2 women:0)
- Netherlands (4) (men:3 women:1)
- New Zealand (1) (men:0 women:1)
- Norway (2) (men:2 women:0)
- South Africa (1) (men:0 women:1)
- Spain (2) (men:2 women:0)
- Sweden (13) (men:9 women:4)
- Switzerland (4) (men:4 women:0)
- United States (22) (men:16 women:6)
