= Swimming at the 1920 Summer Olympics – Men's 4 × 200 metre freestyle relay =

Men's 4 × 200 metre freestyle relay at the Games of the VII Olympiad
- Venue: Stade Nautique d'Antwerp
- Dates: 25 August 1920 (semifinals); 29 August 1920 (final)
- Competitors: 29 from 7 nations
- Teams: 7
- Winning time: 10:04.4 WR

Medalists
1st place, gold medalist(s)		Duke Kahanamoku, Pua Kealoha, Perry McGillivray, Norman Ross; United States
2nd place, silver medalist(s)		Frank Beaurepaire, Henry Hay, William Herald, Ivan Stedman; Australia
3rd place, bronze medalist(s)		Harold Annison, Edward Peter, Leslie Savage, Henry Taylor; Great Britain

The men's 4 × 200 metre freestyle relay was a swimming event held as part of the swimming at the 1920 Summer Olympics programme. It was the third appearance of the event.

A total of 29 swimmers, representing seven teams from seven nations, competed in the event, which was held from Wednesday, August 25 to Sunday, August 29, 1920. Keith Kirkland was replaced by Frank Beaurepaire on the Australian squad between the semifinals and finals. The International Olympic Committee medal database does not show Keith Kirkland as silver medalist for Australia.

== Records ==
These were the standing world and Olympic records (in minutes) prior to the 1920 Summer Olympics.

World record	10:11.2	(Australia) Cecil Healy (New Zealand) Malcolm Champion (Australia) Leslie Boardman (Australia) Harold Hardwick	Stockholm (SWE)	July 15, 1912
Olympic record	10:11.2	(Australia) Cecil Healy (New Zealand) Malcolm Champion (Australia) Leslie Boardman (Australia) Harold Hardwick	Stockholm (SWE)	July 15, 1912

Note: The team competed as Australasia at the 1912 Games.

In the final the United States set a new world record with 10:04.4 minutes.

== Results ==
=== Semifinals ===
Wednesday, August 25, 1920: The top two from each heat and the fastest of third place teams advanced.

Semifinal 1

Place	Swimmers	Time	Qual.
1	Pua Kealoha, Perry McGillivray, Norman Ross, and Duke Kahanamoku (USA)	10:20.4	Q
2	Henry Hay, William Herald, Ivan Stedman, and Keith Kirkland (AUS)	10:23.0	Q
3	Robert Andersson, Frans Möller, Orvar Trolle, and Arne Borg (SWE)	10:54.4	q
4	Albert Mayaud, Paul Vasseur, Georges Pouilley, and Henri Padou (FRA)	11:53.0	

Semifinal 2

Place	Swimmers	Time	Qual.
1	Leslie Savage, Edward Peter, Henry Taylor, and Harold Annison (GBR)	10:51.0	Q
2	Mario Massa, Agostino Frassinetti, Antonio Quarantotto, and Gilio Bisagno (ITA)	11:01.2	Q
3	Jean-Pierre Vermetten, Joseph Cludts, René Bauwens, Gérard Blitz (BEL)	11:12.2	

=== Final ===
Sunday, August 29, 1920: The split times for the winning team McGillivray 2:27.2, Kealoha 2:33.2, Ross 2:30.0, and Kahanamoku 2:34.0 minutes.

Place	Swimmers	Time
1	Perry McGillivray, Pua Kealoha, Norman Ross, and Duke Kahanamoku (USA)	10:04.4 WR
2	Henry Hay, William Herald, Ivan Stedman, and Frank Beaurepaire (AUS)	10:25.4
3	Leslie Savage, Edward Peter, Henry Taylor, Harold Annison (GBR)	10:37.2
4	Robert Andersson, Frans Möller, Orvar Trolle, and Arne Borg (SWE)	10:50.2
5	Mario Massa, Agostino Frassinetti, Antonio Quarantotto, and Gilio Bisagno (ITA)	
