= Monte Alpesisa =

Mountain in Italy

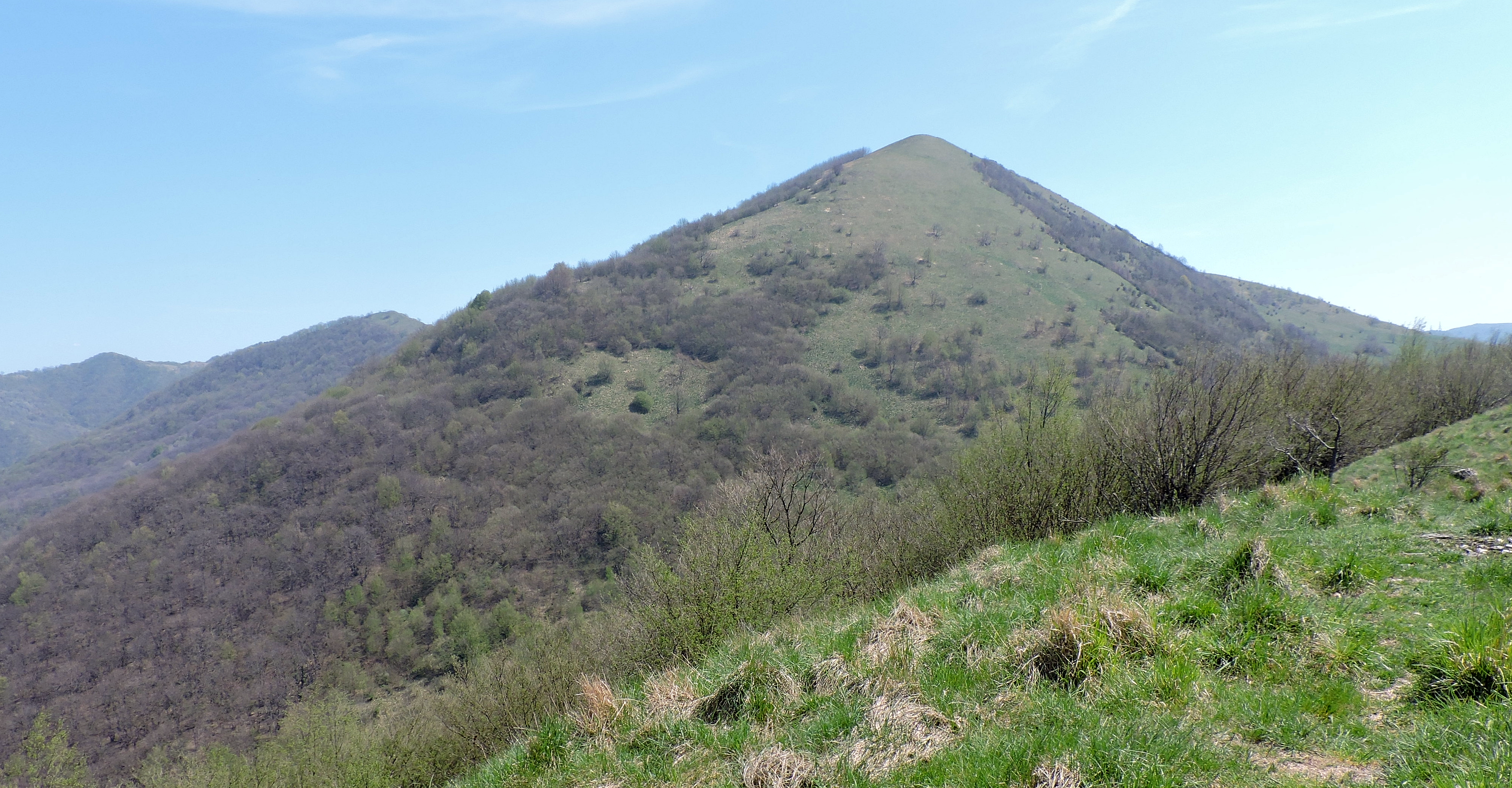
- View from Monte Cornua

Highest point
- Elevation: 989 m (3,245 ft)
- Prominence: 209 m (686 ft)
- Coordinates: 44°28′51.82″N 09°02′28.00″E

Geography
- Location within Italy
- Location: Liguria, Italy
- Parent range: Ligurian Apennines

Climbing
- First ascent: ancestral
- Easiest route: Hike by the North ridge

Monte Alpesisa is a 989 metres high mountain in the Ligurian Apennines, in Italy.

== Characteristics ==
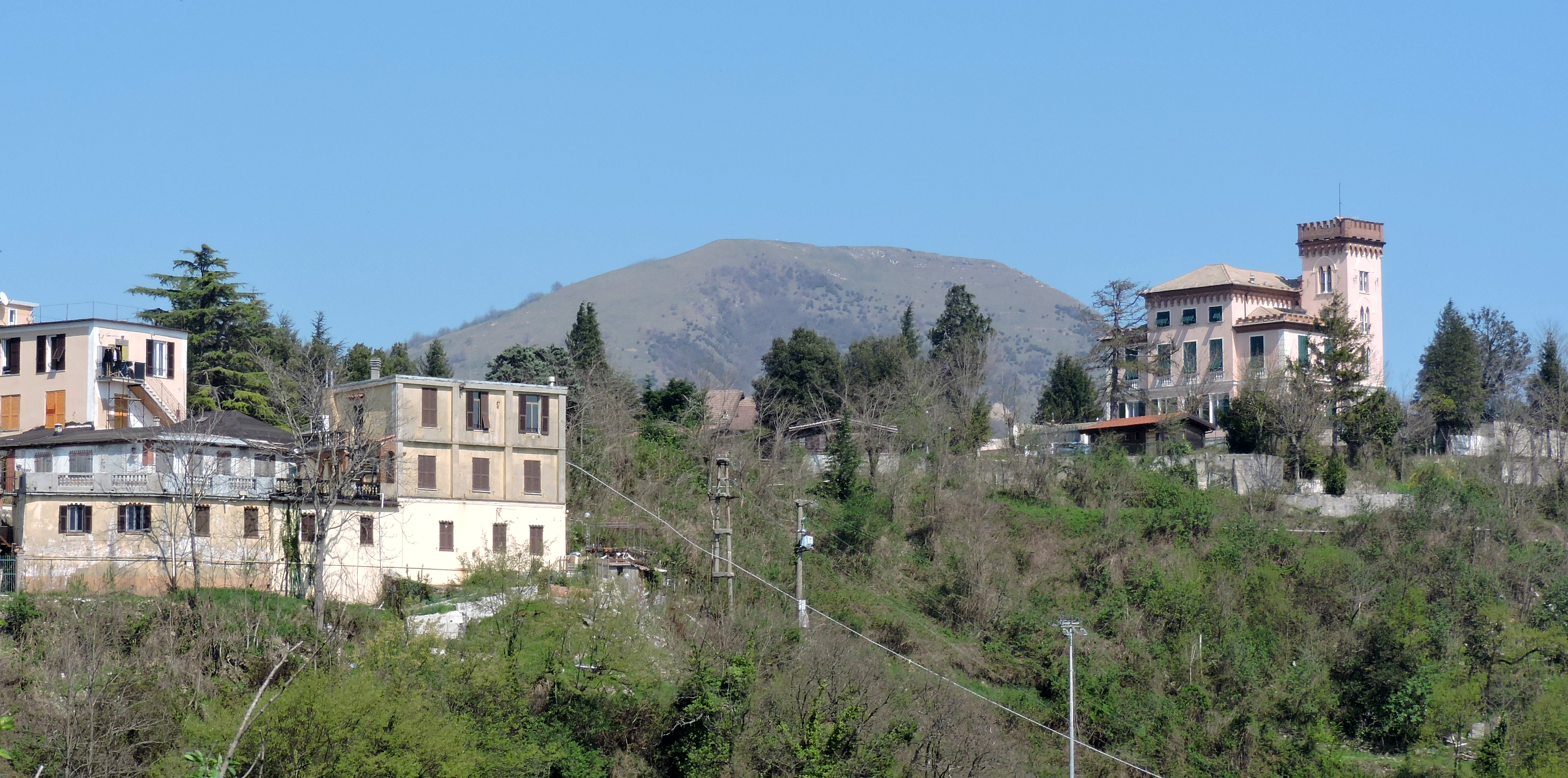
View from Bisagno valley, in the foreground Colle di Creto

The mountain stands on the main Apennine water divide, between Montoggio and Genoa comunes. Westwards the pass of Gola della Sisa (729 m) divides it from Mount Cornua while eastwards the Bisagno/Scrivia ridge goes on with Mount Lago. Mount Alpesisa is notable for its shape, which is trapezoidal when seen from Genoa but looks conical form other points of view. The slopes of the Alpesisa are mainly grassy. Its highest point, which belongs to an almost flat section of the ridge, is marked by a peculiar summit cross made with old leaf springs taken from a truck.

== History ==
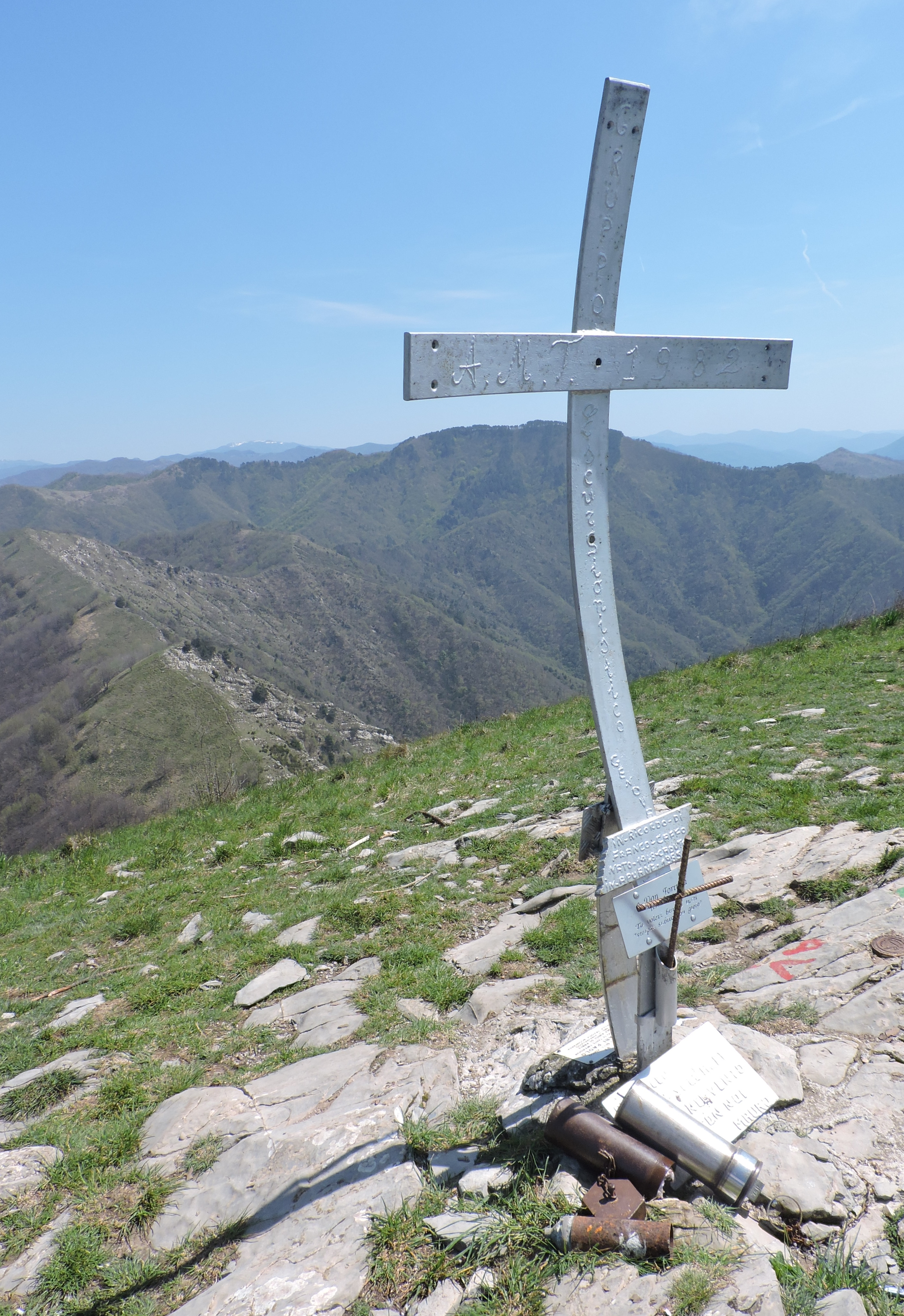
Summit cross

In the past Mount Alpesisa was deforested and the grassland which still covers most of the mountain is in stark contrast with the surrounding woods. During the Italian Resistenza years Alpesisa, thanks to its outstanding location and the long-range views which offers, was for a long time manned by local partisans.

== Access to the summit ==
Mount Alpesisa can easily be accessed without any alpinistic skill. Its summit can be reached following a footpath starting from the 27th stage of Alta Via dei Monti Liguri named Colle di Creto - Passo della Scoffera, which surrounds the mountain on its Scrivia side. It also can be accessed following another footpath climbing the val Bisagno slopes of the mountain and starting from the village of Prato (Struppa, comune of Genova).

== Nature conservation ==
Mount Alpesisa, together with Lago di Val di Noci and a stretch of the Scrivia/Bisagno water divide, belongs to a SIC (Site of Community Importance) named Val Noci - Torrente Geirato - Alpesisa (code IT1331721).
