= Beaurepaire (surname) =

Beaurepaire is a surname. Notable people with the surname include:

- Alexandre-Marie Quesnay de Beaurepaire (1755–1820), French soldier
- Beryl Beaurepaire (1923–2018), Australian political activist, feminist and philanthropist
- Frank Beaurepaire (1891–1956), Australian swimmer, politician and businessman
- Lily Beaurepaire (1892–1979), Australian swimmer and diver
- Nicolas-Joseph Beaurepaire (1740–1792), French military officer
