= Quarantotto =

Quarantotto is an Italian surname. Notable people with the surname include:

- Antonio Quarantotto (1897–1987), Italian swimmer
- Lucio Quarantotto (1957–2012), Italian songwriter
