= Race to Prince's Bridge =

Annual swimming race in Melbourne, Australia

The Race To Prince's Bridge was an annual swimming race in the Yarra River, Melbourne, Australia. The race was "one of the chief swimming events in the world", with a world record 623 entrants in 1929. The race ceased running in 1991 due to high levels of pollution in the Yarra River. However, the race was also cancelled due to pollution concerns from 1963 until 1987.

== Course ==
The 3-mile (4.8 km) course runs from the old Twickenham Ferry crossing (now MacRobertson Bridge) downstream to Princes Bridge (formerly Prince's Bridge) in the heart of Melbourne. The race has changed course several times throughout history, starting from as far upstream as Macaulay's boatsheds, Studley Park.

== Popularity ==
The race often attracted a large number of spectators, who were able to cheer on competitors from the banks of the river or from floating crafts among the swimmers. The high popularity of the event as a spectator friendly occasion is well documented:

"It is without a doubt the most popular aquatic event of the season...The banks of the river for the whole three miles were lined with groups of interested spectators, and over the last two miles hundreds of motor-cars followed the race" The Australasian, 8 March 1930.

"Now regarded as the most important long distance swim in Australia..." The Referee, 11 March 1931

"The race was followed with great attention by many spectators, and the contests were keen", The Bathurst Times, Jan 29, 1913.

"A great crowd of persons of both sexes assembled at the wharf at Grange-road to witness the start of the race, and other spectators were in motor or other boats on the river...The banks of the river on either side of the different bridges were lined with sightseers...On arriving at Princes-bridge there was a large concourse of people to witness the finish." The Age, Jan 27, 1914.

== History ==
The first event was held on January 27, 1913, in which 44 swimmers completed the race conducted by the Victorian Amateur Swimming Association. In following years, the race soon grew to become a premier swimming event with the inclusion of high-profile competitors, notably Ivan Stedman and Frank Beaurepaire. The earliest known footage of the race is from the 1932 event that attracted 549 entrants. The swim began as a handicap race, with a team category (awarded the 3LO Cup) to cater for the local swimming clubs.

The Race to Prince's Bridge was held from 1913 - 1963 when the race was halted due to pollution. The annual race was revived in 1987 for two years by Swimming Victoria along with sponsorship from Manchester Unity, however, the race has not run since 1989.

Historically, the race has also been referred to by the media as the Annual Three Mile Yarra River Swim and other variations of this name.

== Pollution ==
The Annual Three Mile Yarra River Swim has changed course throughout history and been cancelled due to pollution, a continuing problem faced by the Yarra River, particularly downstream. The Yarra River is particularly polluted after heavy rain events that wash debris and pollutants into the flow. Reporting of the swim in local media and newspapers often mentions the courage of competitors tackling the pollution and debris:

"After the heavy rains of Friday night the colour of the water was almost chocolate, with a considerable amount of debris floating about." The Australasian, 10 March 1928.

"Channel Two technical producer Steve Pickering is indulging in a bit of understatement when he says the water in the Yarra River is a bit murky" Discussions with The Age's Ron Carter regarding the filming of the 1988 event.

Race Official:"How was the Yarra?" Miss Gill, 1932 female winner: "Pretty dirty" From the 1932 footage of the race.

While the colour of the river is often referenced when describing the state of the river, particularly by swimmers, this is not a major indicator of pollution. The muddy colour of the downstream portions of the Yarra is instead caused by suspended sediment and clay particles resulting from the high turbidity of the Yarra. The Environment Protection Authority delivers regular reports to warn recreational river users of current pollution levels.

== Information ==
A historical event since the early 20th Century, the Race to Prince's Bridge is a part of Melbourne history.

- In the 1914 race, 11-year-old Thomas Holland received a special medal for a plucky race. The young boy's performance (1hr 59min) received "great applause" at the landing stage.
- The prizes for the 1914 event were as follows: 1st Place - £2 2/ trophy and £2 2/ gold medal; 2nd Place - £2 2/ trophy; 3rd Place - £1 1/ trophy; Fastest Time - £1 1/ trophy.
- In 1928, " more than 1.5cwt (76.2kg) of grease and cocoa-nut oil was applied to the competitors to keep out the cold..."
- In 1931, J.Campbell, aged above 55 years, had started and finished all 15 3-mile Yarra River Swim events.
- J.P Sheedy covered himself in lard and used a rubber breathing apparatus for the 1931 event.
- The Twickenham Ferry service (the original start line for the race) was closed after the completion of the MacRobertson Bridge in 1934.
- R. Woods, a legless Melburnian came 3rd in the 1946 event, only 50 yards behind the winner
- The race held in January 1987, which offered AUD$7000 prizemoney, was the first race since 1963 due to pollution in the Yarra
- The 1947 race began from Macaulay's boatsheds in Studley Park.
- Oldest race winner: Ivan Stedman 1952, aged 56 years.
- In his 29th three mile Yarra swim race, Roy Lander finished 75th in the 1952 event.
- In the late 1950s and early 1960s there were incidents of cheating that caused an increase in the frequency of officials along the course: "Those in charge of the race wondered how [the winner] had swum so far and still been so fresh in beating home the 300 or so other contestants. Officials soon discovered that the winner had hopped out of the river during the race, jumped on the back of a motor bike and sneaked into the water again just before the finish. He was disqualified after an inquiry."

== Example gold medal ==
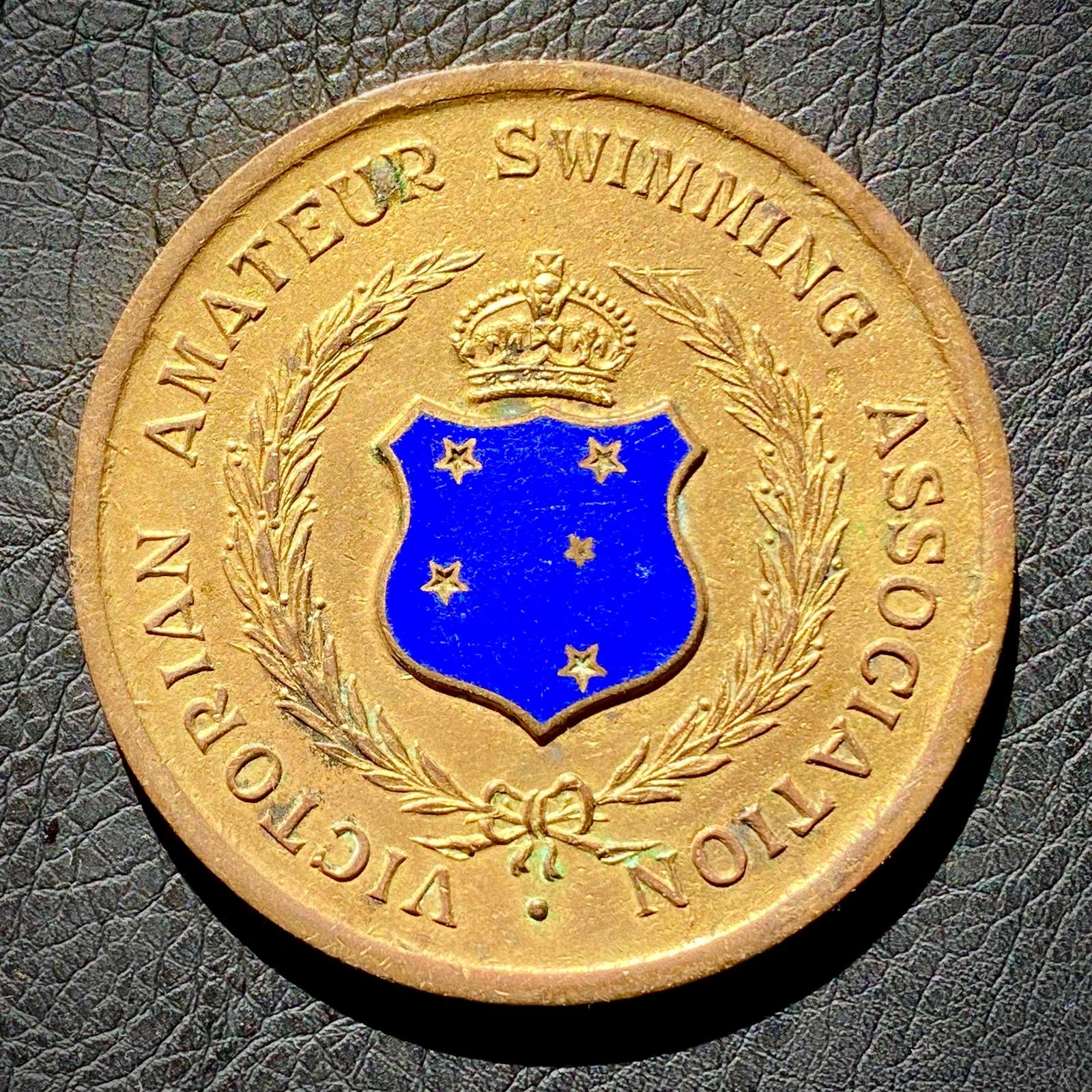
Victorian Amateur Swimming Association Race to Princes Bridge gold medal 1951

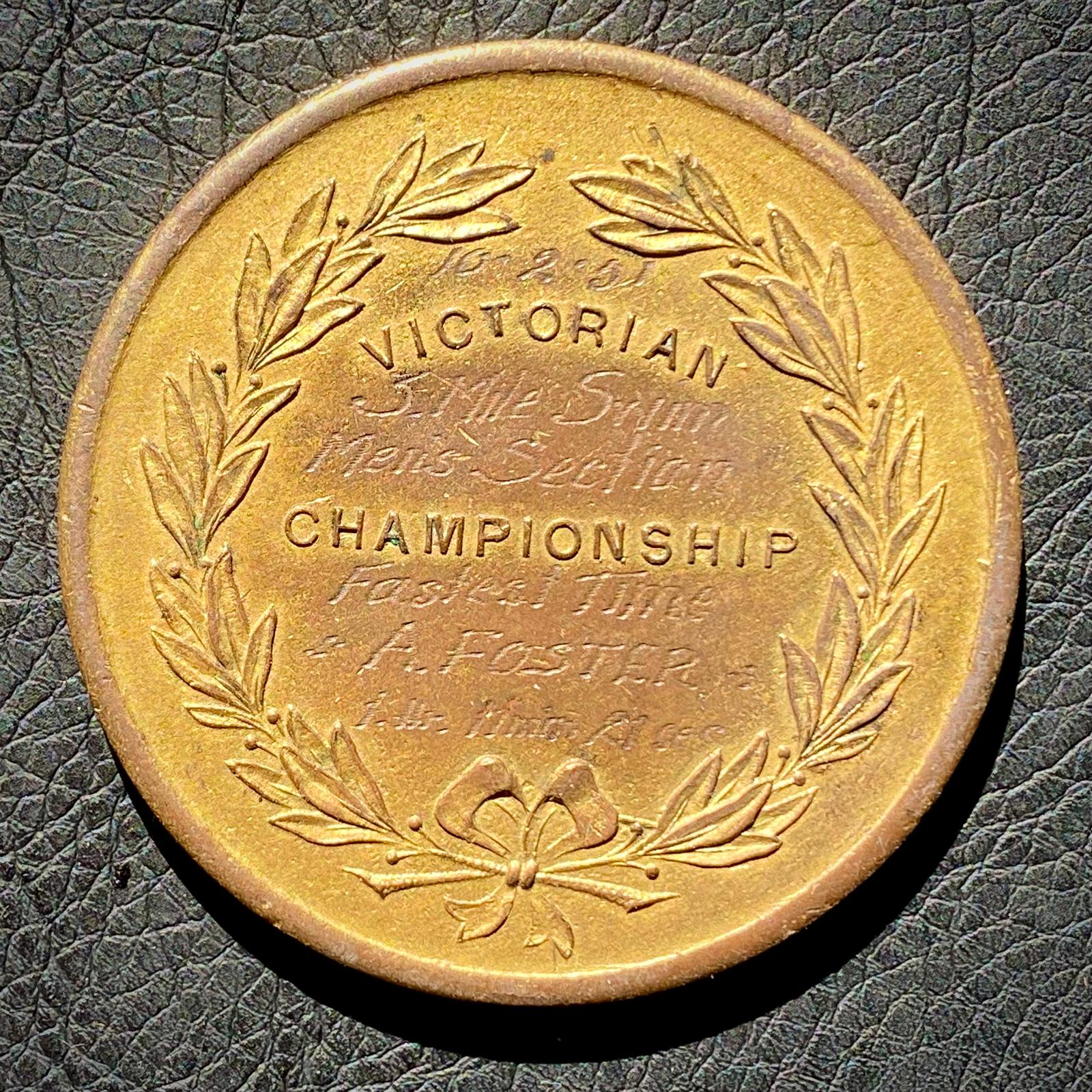
Victorian Amateur Swimming Association Race to Princes Bridge gold medal 1951

== Honour roll ==
=== Winners - men ===
- 1913 G. Morris
- 1914 J.Dineen
- 1915
- 1916
- 1917
- 1918
- 1919
- 1920
- 1921
- 1922
- 1923 A.H. Hay
- 1924
- 1925
- 1926 S. Greenbury
- 1927
- 1928 Dick Gerrard
- 1929
- 1930 Ian MacIntyre
- 1931 A. Gillam
- 1932
- 1933 Noel Overall (1hr 18min 8sec)
- 1934 H. Schlam
- 1935 R. Thurgood
- 1936 Vin Crehan
- 1937 Alan Crawford (58min 34sec Race Record)
- 1938 AF Davis
- 1939 Cyril Murray
- 1940 Jack Christie
- 1941
- 1942
- 1943
- 1944
- 1945 W. (Billy) Weir
- 1946 Ted Kempster Fastest Time: Ivan Stedman (1:21:2 AlternateCourse Record)
- 1947
- 1948 Nestor Mas 1hr 16mins 26secs
- 1949
- 1950
- 1951 Alfred ("Junior") Foster (1:11:21)
- 1952 Ivan Stedman (1:24:53)
- 1953
- 1954
- 1955
- 1956
- 1957 Lyndsay Friend
- 1958
- 1959
- 1960
- 1961
- 1962
- 1963
- 1964-1986 race not held
- 1987 - Rob Woodhouse
- 1988
- 1989
- 1990
- 1991

=== Winners - women ===
- 1913
- 1914
- 1915
- 1916
- 1917
- 1918
- 1919
- 1920
- 1921
- 1922
- 1923
- 1924
- 1925
- 1926 N. O'Neill
- 1927
- 1928 Natalie King
- 1929
- 1930 E. Adams
- 1931 H. Daley
- 1932 Miss Gill
- 1933 N. Foster (1:24:0)
- 1934 M. Smith
- 1935 Beryl Hyde (1:19:10)
- 1936 Valarie George
- 1937
- 1938
- 1939
- 1940
- 1941
- 1942
- 1943
- 1944
- 1945 Valda Lawrence
- 1946 Mildred McCutcheon (1:57:36)
- 1947
- 1948
- 1949
- 1950
- 1951
- 1952
- 1953
- 1954
- 1955
- 1956
- 1957
- 1958
- 1959
- 1960
- 1961
- 1962
- 1963
- 1964-1986 race not held
- 1987 - Sue Evans
- 1988
- 1989
- 1990
- 1991
