= Joaquín Cuadrada =

Spanish swimmer (1893–1969)

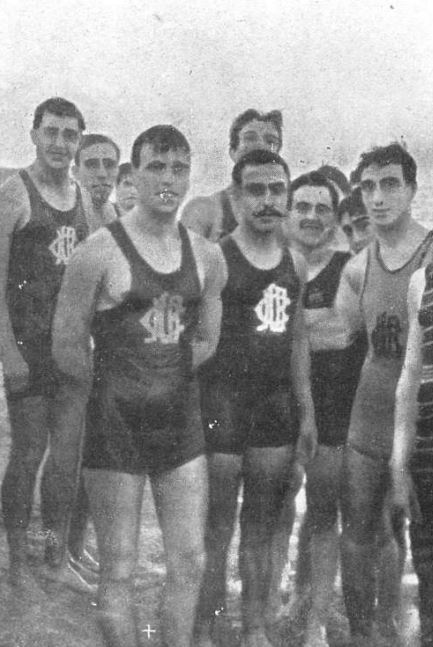
- Cuadrada in 1911

Personal information
- Born: 23 June 1893 Mataró, Spain
- Died: 30 March 1969 (aged 75) Barcelona, Spain

Sport
- Sport: Swimming

Joaquín Cuadrada Esquerra (23 June 1893 – 30 March 1969) was a Spanish swimmer who competed in the men's 1500 metre freestyle event at the 1920 Summer Olympics.

== Career ==
Born in Mataró on 23 June 1893, Cuadrada began his swimming career in the ranks of CN Barcelona, where he was coached by the Swede Albert Berglund. He was the Spanish champion in the 500-metre freestyle on three occasions (1918, 1919, 1920) and 1,500-metre freestyle ten times (1911–14, 1916–21), thus being considered the best long-distance swimmer in Spain at the time. In 1914, Cuadrada set a record for the longest distance swam in an hour in the open sea (2,245 meters), which he improved to 3,100 meters in 1917. On 24 August 1919, he finished in fifth place in the crossing of the Seine in Paris over a distance of 11,7 km, and in 1921, he was the champion of the 2,000 metres in open water.

In that same year, Cuadrada organised a swimming championship for bank employees in Barcelona, which was won by Josep Oriol Tuñí from Mataró. Oriol's victory inspired the organization of a sports festival in Mataró, held on 25 July 1920, which included swimming, diving, and water polo tournaments, with Cuadrada winning the Costa de Llevant Championship over 1000 meters, thus showing good form ahead of the upcoming Olympics.

Cuadrada was a member of the Spanish delegation that participated in the 1920 Olympic Games in Antwerp, where he competed in the 1,500-meter freestyle, thus becoming not only the first Spanish swimmer to compete in the Olympics, but also the first-ever athlete from Mataró to do so. There, he finished fourth in his heat with a time of 28:01:02, almost six minutes behind the eventual Olympic champion, the American Norman Ross.

In 1921, Cuadrada reinforced the Mataró Swimming Club in a water polo friendly match against Pop de Badalona, helping his side to a 7–1 victory.
