= Giovanni Francesco Arcasio =

Italian jurist

Giovanni Francesco Arcasio (23 January 1712 – 25 November 1791) was a jurist from the Kingdom of Sardinia, who taught civil law at the University of Turin from 1749 to 1791.

== Biography ==
Arcasio was born in Bisagno, studied in Turin where he obtained a degree in law in 1733. He was also facile with Latin and erudite in Ancient Roman law. In 1743, King Carlo Emmanuele III named him professor of civil law. He wrote extensive commentaries on law: Commentaria iuris civilis (1782, 1784). A conservative and contemplative man, every year he would retreat for a month to a Camaldolese monastery. He was a member of the local scholarly societies of Sampaolina and Filopatria. In 1777, he was named Senator.
