= Beaurepaire =

Beaurepaire may refer to:

== People ==
- Beaurepaire (surname)

== Places ==
=== England ===
- Beaurepaire, Hampshire in the civil parish of Sherborne St John in Hampshire
- Bearpark, County Durham, originally called Beaurepaire
- Belper, Derbyshire, the name of which is believed to be a corruption of Beaurepaire

=== France ===
- Beaurepaire, Isère
- Beaurepaire, Oise
- Beaurepaire, Seine-Maritime
- Beaurepaire, Vendée
- Beaurepaire-en-Bresse, in the Saône-et-Loire département
- Beaurepaire-sur-Sambre, in the Nord département

== Other uses ==
- Beaurepaire station, a commuter rail station in Beaconsfield, Quebec, Canada
- Château de Beaurepaire, Montreuil, Pas-de-Calais
