= Ludy Langer =

American swimmer

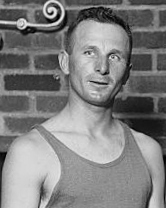
- Langer circa 1920

Personal information
- Full name: Ludwig Ernest Frank Langer
- National team: United States
- Born: January 21, 1893 Los Angeles, California, U.S.
- Died: July 5, 1984 (aged 91) Los Angeles, California, U.S.
- Height: 5 ft 9 in (1.75 m)
- Weight: 161 lb (73 kg)

Sport
- Sport: Swimming
- Strokes: Freestyle, Distance
- Club: Hui Nalu (Honolulu); Redondo Beach Club; L. A. Athletic Club
- College team: U. Cal Berkeley 1916
- Coach: George Freeth (Redondo Club, LAAC); Harvey Chilton (Hui Nalu); George Center, ('20 Olympics)
Medal record
Men's swimming
Representing the United States
Olympic Games
Silver medal – second place	1920 Antwerp	400 m freestyle

Ludwig Ernest Frank Langer (January 22, 1893 – July 5, 1984) was a Hall of Fame American competition swimmer and world record holder who competed in freestyle events for the University of California Berkeley, and won a silver medal in the 400-meter freestyle at the 1920 Antwerp Olympics. After moving to Hawaii after graduating from U.C. Berkeley in 1916 to train and work, he was one of six Hawaii-based swimmers who competed at the 1920 Summer Olympics and collectively won seven medals.

== Early swimming at Redondo Beach ==
Born in Los Angeles on January 22, 1893, Langer learned to swim at the Redondo Beach pool, a large indoor saltwater swimming pool, known as the "Plunge". He attended Redondo Union High School and trained with the Redondo Beach Swim Club though the group was informal at the time. Competing by the age of 14 while a student at Redondo High School on May 27, 1911, Langer won the 100-yard freestyle in 1:08.4 and the 220-yard freestyle in 2:55.6 at the Southern California Interscholastic Swimming Tournament at Redondo Beach. At the Redondo Beach Club, Langer was mentored by Hall of Famer, and Hawaiian native, Coach George Freeth.

Langer worked as a lifeguard at Redondo Beach with fellow Redondo High Student and 1920 Olympian Ray Kegeris in a lifeguarding program started by George Freeth. In 1912, Freeth started California’s first official surf club in Redondo Beach, naming it Hui Nalu, after the famous club in Waikīkī, which swimming Olympian Duke Kahanamoku, had helped to form. Langer would later compete as a representative of the club. In a 1980 interview, Langer, recalled Freeth with admiration, noting, "He (Freeth) coached I don't know how many of us-four of us went to the Olympics and he never charged us a dime."

== University of California ==
Langer swam for and attended the University of California Berkeley from around 1912, and served as swim team Captain in 1916 when he graduated with a degree in Civil Engineering. Considered by many to be the University of California's first truly exceptional swimmer, Langer earned three consecutive varsity letters in swimming for U. Cal from 1914-1916. He worked as an engineer in Hawaii after his graduation, and helped in the building of Pearl Harbor around 1916. By his senior year at the University of California in 1916, Langer held three world records in freestyle events.

== Career highlights ==
Langer won the 440-yard, 880-yard and one-mile freestyle events at the 1915 and 1916 Amateur Athletic Union (AAU) championships. By 1916 he held world records in the 440y indoor, and 880y outdoor and 1 mile events, but could not compete in the Olympics in 1916 as they were cancelled due to World War I. During competition in the Honolulu Harbor area, he set a world record in the 500-yard freestyle of 6:11.4 in 1916, and a world record of 5:17 for the 400-yard freestyle in 1917. He held a world record in the quarter mile for a five-year period until losing it to Hall of Fame swimmer Norman Ross. Several of his freestyle records would be broken by Olympian Johnny Weissmuller Continuing to swim after the 1916 Olympics, he won eight U.S. National Championships from 1915 through 1921.

== 1920 Antwerp Olympic silver medal ==
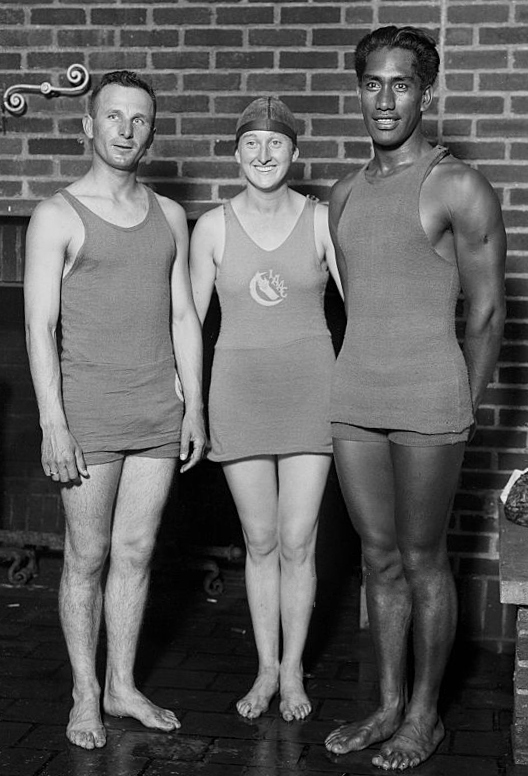
Langer, C. Galligan and D. Kohanamoku

Langer won the U.S. Western Olympic Trials for the 400-meter freestyle event on June 26, 1920 at Neptune Beach in Alameda, California, with a time of 5:22, placing ahead of both fellow Olympian Bill Harris of Hawaii and Hawaiian Olympic gold medalist Duke Kahanamoku. According to his obituary in the Honolulu Star-Bulletin, Langer swam the Antwerp Olympics not long after recovering from a broken eardrum.

He won a silver medal in the 400-meter freestyle at the 1920 Olympic finals with a time of 5:26.8, touching second to American Norman Ross who took the gold finishing 2.2 seconds earlier. Ross and Australian swimmer, Frank Beaurepaire, were heavily favored to win but Beaurepaire went out with too much speed and did not finish the final as a result.

Langer failed to reach the final of the 1,500-meter freestyle, though his time of 24:28.8 was the eighth fastest, and would have qualified him for the finals in more recent competition where finals pools average eight lanes. American Norman Ross took the gold medal, taking the lead around the half way point at 900 meters.

== WWI Army service ==
Langer served in the U.S. Army's Quartermaster's Corps as a Captain in WWI, and was absent for a period from American swimming competition. He resigned from the service to train for the 1920 Olympics.

== Swimming and living in Hawaii ==
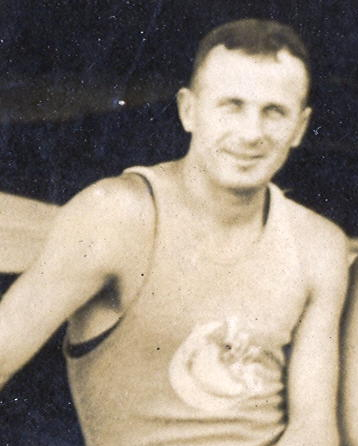
Langer 1920, LAAC jersey

Subsequent to his west coast swimming career at U. Cal Berkeley through 1916, Langer trained and competed as part of the Hawaiian association swimmers preparing for the 1920 Olympics. Langer had his primary residence in Hawaii from around August, 1916-January, 1922. While in his Senior year at U. Cal Berkeley on February 22, 1916, Langer won the 880-yard freestyle event in Honolulu, with a time of 12:01.2, a new American record. From 1916-1920, Langer swam regularly in Hawaii, not infrequently in the Honolulu area. Langer received additional coaching nearing the 1920 Olympics from George "Dad" Center of Honolulu's Outrigger Canoe Club who was Head Coach for the 1920 U.S. Olympic Swimming Team, and travelled to both the Olympic Trials and to the Olympics in Antwerp with Langer and the team. During his Olympic training in Hawaii, and during Hawaiian competition in the years prior to the 1920 Olympics, Langer was frequently listed as a member of the Hui Nalu swim club coached by Hawaiian native Harvey Chilton. Langer was also occasionally listed as swimming for the Los Angeles Athletic Club where he was again trained by George Freeth between 1913-1915 and later by Vance Veith. In March 1917, while at U.C. Berkeley, Langer won the 500-yard freestyle race at the Pacific Coast Swimming Championship in San Francisco, with a record time of 5:09.4.

After living in Hawaii for around six years, Langer returned to Los Angeles in January, 1922 to continue swimming for the Los Angeles Athletic Club and to begin work for his new business the Los Angeles Sausage Cover Manufacturing Company, which also made music strings and tennis racket strings.

== Death ==
Langer died of natural causes at 91 on July 5, 1984, three days after being admitted to the Centinela Park Convalescent Home in Inglewood outside Los Angeles, having been a resident of Baldwin Hills, California. In 1972 he retired from the Guenther-Langer Buick Agency in California's Leimert Park, having served as a partner. He was survived by a son, a daughter and grandchildren.

== Honors ==
In 1986, he was inducted into the University of California Athletic Hall of Fame. In 1988 he was posthumously inducted into the International Swimming Hall of Fame.

== See also ==
- List of members of the International Swimming Hall of Fame
