= Cor Zegger =

Dutch swimmer

Personal information
- Nationality: Dutch
- Born: 11 March 1897 Amsterdam, Netherlands
- Died: 5 January 1961 (aged 63) Farmington, Connecticut, United States

Sport
- Sport: Swimming

Cor Zegger (11 March 1897 – 5 January 1961) was a Dutch swimmer. He competed in the men's 1500 metre freestyle event at the 1920 Summer Olympics. He failed to qualify for the semifinals, finishing third in the second heat.
