= Beaurepaires =

Australian tyre retailer operating in Australia and New Zealand

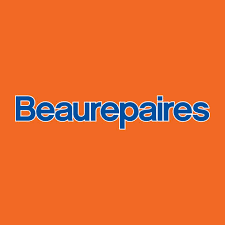
- Company type: Private
- Industry: Automotive
- Founded: 1922; 104 years ago
- Headquarters: Melbourne
- Products: Tyres
- Owner: Goodyear Tire and Rubber Company
- Website: www.beaurepaires.com.au

Beaurepaires was an Australian and New Zealand tyre retail and repair chain started in 1922 by Frank Beaurepaire, a former Olympic swimmer for Australia and Australasia, with money he received for rescuing a shark attack victim from the water at Sydney.

Beaurepaires is a subsidiary of Goodyear and Dunlop Tyres Australia.

In February 2024, it was reported that Goodyear and Dunlop Tyres had begun to look at shuttering its network of 100 Beaurepaires locations, with some locations rebranding to Goodyear Auto Service. Negotiations were held with rival Bob Jane T-Marts to acquire the chain but ultimately fell through, with Bob Jane instead choosing to only purchase a select number of profitable locations. In New Zealand, all Beaurepaires locations were rebranded to Advantage Tyre Solutions in 2023. Many locations have since rebranded to Goodyear or Dunlop Tyres.

== Marketing ==
From 2018, Beaurepaires sponsored DJR Team Penske in the Supercars Championship. In 2019, Beaurepaires became the title sponsor of the Supercars Championship event the Melbourne 400, a support event to the Australian Grand Prix.

The New Zealand chain is also noted for TV commercials featuring Australian actor Vince Martin as a spokesperson, which he has appeared for more than 25 years, particularly the (singing) Christmas commercials and the simplistic "This is a spoon" advert.
