= Pierre Lavraie =

French swimmer

Personal information
- Full name: Pierre Lavraie
- Nationality: French

Sport
- Sport: Swimming

Pierre Lavraie was a French swimmer. He competed in the men's 1500 metre freestyle event at the 1920 Summer Olympics.
