= Eugene Bolden =

American swimmer

- Bolden during his swimming career

Personal information
- Full name: Eugene Thomas Bolden
- National team: United States
- Born: July 23, 1899 Memphis, Tennessee, U.S.
- Died: September 6, 1991 (aged 92) St. Louis, Missouri, U.S.
- Occupation: Electrial Engineer
- Spouse: Ada Catherine Milliken

Sport
- Sport: Swimming
- Events: 1500-meter freestyle 2-mile Freestyle; 10-mile Delaware River Swim
- Strokes: Freestyle
- Club: Illinois Athletic Club (IAC); Coliseum Swim Club (St. Louis)
- Coach: Bill Bachrach (IAC); George Center ('20 Olympics)

Eugene Thomas Bolden (July 23, 1899 – September 6, 1991) was an American competition swimmer who competed for the Illinois Athletic Club and represented the United States in the men's 1,500-meter freestyle at the 1920 Summer Olympics in Antwerp, Belgium. As a swimmer, he was best known for winning the 10-mile swim in the Delaware river outside Philadelphia for three successive years, and for winning the 1-mile qualifying swim for the 1920 Antwerp Olympics in a time of 25:26.28. He served in the U.S. Navy in WWI as a machinist mate, and after a long career as an electrical engineer retired from J.C. Penny Manufacturing in the 1960's.

== Early life ==
Bolden was born July 23, 1899 in Memphis, Tennessee. In late 1919, he joined Chicago's Illinois Athletic Club where he was coached by Hall of Fame inductee Bill Bachrach. During his swimming career, Bolden set a course record for a ten-mile swim he did in the Delaware River outside Philadelphia in 1919. In July of 1920, he again won the race, considered a National AAU event, winning by a considerable distance despite having to rest briefly during the swim.

== Naval service ==
Bolden was a WWI veteran of the U.S. Navy where he served as a first-class aviation machinist's mate. He prepared for the 1920 Olympics at the Great Lakes Naval Training Center in Lake County Illinois, near North Chicago.

== 1920 Olympic trials ==
On July 10, 1920, Bolden won a one-mile swim by only a one-yard distance with a time of 25:26, in an AAU championship event in a 100-meter pool at Chicago's Lincoln Park Lagoon, considered that year as a qualifier in the 1-mile distance for the 1920 Olympics. The close race was witnessed by 20,000 spectators who lined the Lagoon. Ludy Langer of Hawaii took second with a very close time of 25:26.8, and Fred Kahele, a native Hawaiian who swam for the Central Brooklyn YMCA took third. All three finishers would become Olympians.

== 1920 Olympics ==
At the 1920 Antwerp Olympics in late August, Bolden was coached by George "Dad" Center, an Hawaiian native born in Kipahulu, Maui to the owner of a sugar plantation. Though Center's destiny was tied to the Hawaiian islands, he was not known to be of native ancestry. Center had been a highly successful coach in Hawaii, and had trained several outstanding Hawaiian swimmers with the Outrigger Canoe Club in Honolulu, Oahu. During his career, Center developed seven Olympic swimmers including Olympic gold medalist Buster Crabbe, and native Hawaiians that included Olympic gold medalist Duke Kahanamoku, and Olympic gold medalist Warren Kealoha. The U.S. team performed well in 1920, with the Hawaiian swimmers exceeding the expectations of many spectators.

At the 1920 Antwerp Olympics Bolden competed in the men's 1,500-meter freestyle and finished fifth in the event final with an estimated time of 24:04.3. American Norman Ross took the gold medal with a time of 22:23.2, George Vernot of Canada took the silver with a time of 22:36.4, and Frank Beaurepaire of Australia took the bronze with a time of 23:04.0.

=== 1924 Olympic trials ===
Bolden, though continuing to compete through 1923, declined an offer to participate in the 1924 trials or compete in the Olympics that year, and began summer studies at Bellbuckle, Tennessee's Web School, anticipating starting college in the Fall of 1924 He won the "Doc Hottum" Annual 10 Mile Marathon swim in Memphis in 1922, and won the National AAU mile swim in Pensacola, Florida in 1923. He was scheduled to swim the 440, 880-yard and a backstroke event for the Memphis team at the Southeastern Division AAU Championship in Memphis in August, 1924.

Continuing to train after the 1920 Olympics, Bolden competed for the New Coliseum Athletic Club in St. Louis, where he won the 400-yard freestyle in a time of 6:25, and the 150-yard backstroke with a time of 2:01.8 at the Municipal Swimming Championships on August, 16, 1928 at the Marquette Pool.

Bolden married Aida Catherine Milliken around 1950.

Bolden died Friday, at the age of 92, on September 6, 1991 at St. Anthony's Medical Center in St. Louis following a short illness. Possibly benefitting from his WWI training as a machinist's mate, Bolden had a long career as an electrical engineer in manufacturing with J.C. Penny. He retired from Penny's in the 1960's, and lived in Afton, Missouri in his retirement. A mid-day mass was held at St. George Catholic Church in Afton. He was interred at Jefferson Barracks National Cemetery. He was survived by his wife Ada Catherine Milliken Bolden, 2 daughters, 6 sons, 10 grandchildren, and a great grand-child.
