= Fred Kahele =

American swimmer

- Kahele playing guitar with string band Mid-Pacific Quartet in Oakland, CA, circa 1924

Personal information
- Full name: Frederick Kulanui Kahele; Frederick Kulanui Kaluna (Circa '26)
- National team: United States
- Born: November 5, 1900 Kipahulu, Hawaii
- Died: March 20, 1976 (aged 75) Stockton, California, U.S.
- Occupations: Musician in guitar group 1920's Stevedore in Oakland, CA. Fruit ranch foreman
- Spouse: Katherine Bellew (m. 1922)
- Children: 1 (Fred George)

Sport
- Sport: Swimming
- Events: 100, 440-yard, 1500-meter freestyle
- Strokes: Freestyle
- Club: Central YMCA, Brooklyn, N.Y. Long Beach Bath House Club; Neptune Beach Club (Stockton, CA, 1922-23); Pacific City Club
- Coach: Ted Combs (Long Beach Bath Club); Eric Hebbe (Neptune Beach S.C.); George D. Center ('20 Olympics)

Fred Kulanui Kahele (November 5, 1900 – March 20, 1976) or Fred Kulanui Kalune after a name change around 1925, was an American competition swimmer and native Hawaiian, who specialized in distance freestyle and competed for Brooklyn's Central YMCA from around 1918-1921. He served for several years in the U.S. Naval reserves beginning in 1917, and represented the United States at the 1920 Summer Olympics in Antwerp, Belgium. Continuing to compete in swimming, he settled in California in late 1921, and married in 1922 in Chico, California. After retiring from swimming by 1924 after moving to Oakland with his wife and son, he played guitar for a string quartet that specialized in Hawaiian music, and held jobs that included working as a stevedore on the Oakland docks, and as a foreman on a fruit ranch. In the early 1940's he moved with his wife and son to Lodi, California.

Fred Kahele was born November 5, 1900, in Kipahulu on the island of Maui in Hawaii, though little is known from historical records of his early life. He was known to have grown up in the city of Honolulu, and to have entered the U.S. Naval reserve around the age of 17 from a San Francisco recruiting station. During his service, he was stationed in both New York and California. According to various newspaper accounts, Kahele was known to have been a member and competed with the Central YMCA in Brooklyn, New York.

== 1920 Olympic trials ==
Kahele, while still a member of the Central YMCA, trained for the 1920 Olympic trials at the Naval Training Station in Great Lakes, Illinois in June, 1920.

At the United States Olympic swimming men's trial finals in Chicago, Illinois, on July 10-11, 1920, Kahele placed fourth in the 400-meter freestyle event and third in the 1,500-meter free, qualifying him for a berth on the U.S. Olympic team for the Olympics in Antwerp, Belgium.

== 1920 Antwerp Olympics ==
At the 1920 Antwerp Olympics in late August, Kahele was coached by George "Dad" Center, an Hawaiian native born in Kipahulu, Maui to the owner of a sugar plantation. Though Coach Center's destiny was tied to the Hawaiian islands, he was not known to be of native ancestry. Center had been a highly successful coach in Hawaii, and had trained several outstanding Hawaiian swimmers with the Outrigger Canoe Club in Honolulu, Oahu. During his career, Center developed seven Olympic swimmers including Olympic gold medalist Buster Crabbe, and native Hawaiians that included Olympic gold medalist Duke Kahanamoku, and Olympic gold medalist Warren Kealoha.

Having qualified at the trial finals in Chicago, Fred Kahele competed in the men's 400-meter freestyle, advanced to the event final on August 28, and finished fourth overall with a time of 5:35.8. American Norman Ross took the gold medal with a time of 5:26.8, American Ludy Langer took the silver with a 5:29.0, and George Vernot of Canada took the bronze with a time of 5:29.6. Though he finished six seconds behind Canadian Bronze medalist George Vernot, the fact that he did not medal affected the level of publicity he received, and may have somewhat impacted his future opportunities to perform in swimming exhibitions, coach swimming, or garner recognition as an entertainer.

Kahele also swam in the finals of the men's 1,500-meter freestyle and finished in fourth place in his second event with a time of 23:59.1, though the time was considered somewhat estimated. American Norman Ross took the gold medal with a time of 22:23.2, George Vernot of Canada took the silver with a time of 22:36.4, and Frank Beaurepaire of Australia took the bronze with a time of 23:04.0.

=== Central YMCA swim club ===
After returning from the Olympics, Kahele swam in an exhibition at the opening of the Brooklyn's Central YMCA's new location at 125 South Elliott on November 19, 1920.

Kahele continued to compete with the Central YMCA after the Olympics, winning several meets in the midwestern United States. He found his home had been burglarized when he returned to Brooklyn from his meets in the midwest shortly after February 3, 1921, and many of his swimming trophies had been stolen. In March, 1921, suffering from a case of influenza, he was confined to a Naval Hospital.

=== Long Beach Swim Club ===
Kahele relocated to California around October 1921, living in Long Beach, where he represented the Long Beach Bath House aquatic team and swam for Coach Ted Combs. Representing the Long Beach Bath House Club at a water carnival on January 4, 1922, Kahele was scheduled to swim a 220-yard race against four competitors.

=== Marriage ===
Kahele married Katherine Bellew, in July, 1922 in Chico, California though there were no newspaper accounts covering their marriage or engagement.

=== Stockton and Pacific City clubs ===
In the early 1920's, he represented the Stockton Neptune Beach Swim club where he was coached and trained by Coach Eric O. Hebbe, a native Swede, and competed in a 100-yard sprint event during a round of the Central California Swimming League against a club from Alameda. At the Stockton Neptune Beach club, Kahele was better known for his skills as a distance swimmer, and frequently competed in distance events, including the 440-yard swim, though he had been timed in under a minute for the 100-yard event in which he also competed. He represented the Pacific City club in Pacific City, California where he swam the 50-yard event in a Pacific Association meet in Neptune Beach in October, 1923, and had competed representing the Pacific Club in 1922, usually specializing in sprint, middle distance events, and relays.

=== Legal issues ===
In 1923, he had legal issues as he was not living with his wife Katherine, who was pregnant. In March, 1923, during a period when he played with an entertainment group in Chico, California, where he had been married, Kahele was arrested on a charge of desertion and non-support. After son Fred Junior was born on June 8, 1923, Kahele was again arrested at a swim meet in October of 1923, on charges of non-support and desertion, though he was soon released after a settlement. Apparently having settled their financial affairs, by 1924 he resided with his wife Katherine in Oakland, California, though he had retired from his swimming career.

=== Careers ===
In Oakland, he continued to play guitar for the entertainment group Mid-pacific Quartet, where he was featured with musicians Manual Sousa, A. Machado, and Daniel Kuanna, who played guitar and ukelele. Their popular Hawaiian music, which included KaMoae a piece of religious praise, and the Aloha Blues was featured on Oakland's radio KLX in the third week of March, 1924, though they also played American-based music. A few years prior to 1928, Kahele changed the family name to Kalune, a not uncommon name in Hawaii. During this period, he worked as a stevedore on the docks in Oakland, and as a fruit ranch foreman.

The family later moved to Lodi, California in the 1940's. Fred Kalune's son, known as Fred George Kalune Sr., graduated Lodi Union High School in 1942 where he was a California Interscholastic Freestyle swimming champion and played halfback on his high school's football team. He served with the Army Air Corps in WWII.

As Fred Kalanui Kalune, while living in Lodi, he died on March 20, 1976, in greater Stockton, California, and was buried at Cherokee Memorial Park in Lodi, North of central Stockton. He was pre-deceased by his wife Katherine, and survived by his son Fred George Kalune, born in 1923, and grandchildren. As noted previously, Fred's son Fred G. Kalune, who graduated the Army's Aerial Gunnery School in Las Vegas, Nevada served as a highly decorated waist gunner with the 379th aerial bombardment group flying primarily B-17's with the Army Air Corp in WWII. He reached the rank of Staff Sergeant, and flew missions primarily over Germany. After completing his required number of combat missions, he worked for a period as a gunnery instructor stationed in England.
