= Paul De Backer =

Belgian swimmer (1894–1963)

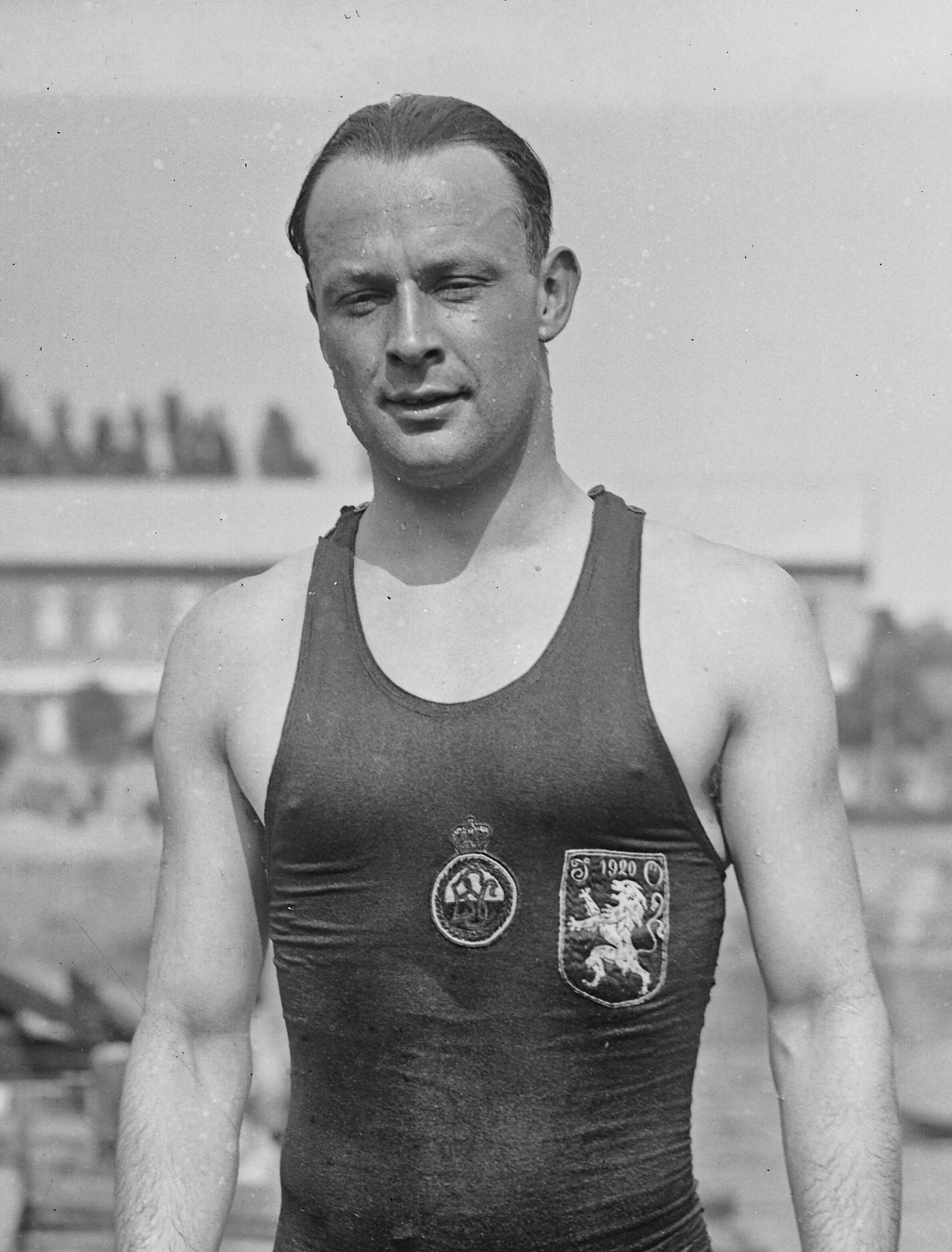
- Paul De Backer in 1921

Personal information
- Nationality: Belgian
- Born: 28 November 1894 Schaerbeek, Belgium
- Died: 9 January 1963 (aged 68) Brussels, Belgium

Sport
- Sport: Swimming

Paul De Backer (28 November 1894 – 9 January 1963) was a Belgian swimmer. He competed in the men's 1500 metre freestyle event at the 1920 Summer Olympics.
