= Frans Möller (swimmer) =

Swedish swimmer (1897–1995)

Personal information
- Born: February 25, 1897 Malmö, Sweden
- Died: April 14, 1995 (aged 98) Lund, Sweden

Sport
- Sport: Swimming

Frans Baillieu Möller (25 February 1897 – 14 April 1995) was a Swedish freestyle swimmer who competed in the 1920 Summer Olympics.

In 1920, he was a member of the Swedish relay team which finished fourth in the 4 x 200 metre freestyle relay competition. In the 1500 metre freestyle event he was eliminated in the first round.
