= Emanuel Prüll =

Czech swimmer

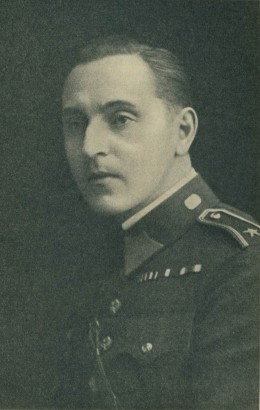
- Emanuel Prüll

Personal information
- Full name: Emanuel Prüll
- Born: 27 October 1896 Prague, Austria-Hungary
- Died: 28 February 1980 (aged 83) Prague, Czechoslovakia

Sport
- Sport: Swimming

Emanuel Prüll (27 October 1896 – 28 February 1980) was a Czech swimmer. He competed in the men's 1500 metre freestyle event at the 1920 Summer Olympics.
