= Leslie Savage =

British swimmer (1897–1979)

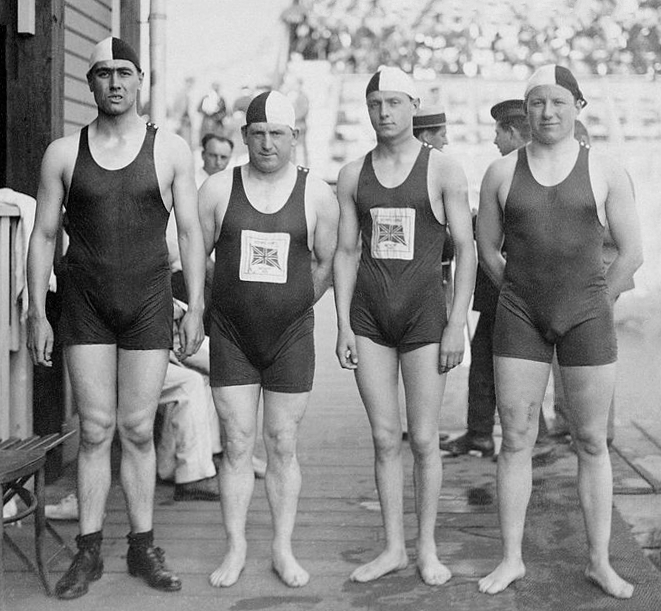
- British 4×200 m team at 1920 Olympics; Savage is first on right.

Personal information
- Full name: Leslie Savage
- National team: Great Britain
- Born: 16 March 1897 Sutton, London, England
- Died: 26 August 1979 (aged 82) Worthing, England

Sport
- Sport: Swimming
- Strokes: Freestyle
Medal record
Men's swimming
Representing Great Britain
Olympic Games
Bronze medal – third place	1920 Antwerp	4×200 m freestyle relay

Leslie Savage (16 March 1897 – 26 August 1979) was a British freestyle swimmer who competed at the 1920 and 1924 Summer Olympics. In 1920, he won a bronze medal as a member of the British team in the men's 4×200-metre relay. He competed in the semifinal of the 100-metre freestyle. In 1924, he swam the final leg in the first qualifying heat of the 4×200-metre relay event as a member of the British team but was later replaced by John Thomson in the semifinal and final. The British team finished in fifth place.

== See also ==
- List of Olympic medalists in swimming (men)
