= Jack King (cyclist) =

Australian cyclist

Personal information
- Born: 6 September 1897
- Died: 23 August 1983 (aged 85)

Cycling career
- Sport: Cycling

Jack King (6 September 1897 – 23 August 1983) was an Australian cyclist. He competed in two events at the 1920 Summer Olympics.
