= Bisagno =

Bisagno is an Italian surname. Notable people with the surname include:

- Gilio Bisagno (1903–1987), Italian swimmer
- Tommaso Bisagno (1935–2014), Italian academic and politician

== See also ==
- Bisagno, a river in Liguria
