= George Vernot =

Canadian swimmer (1901–1962)

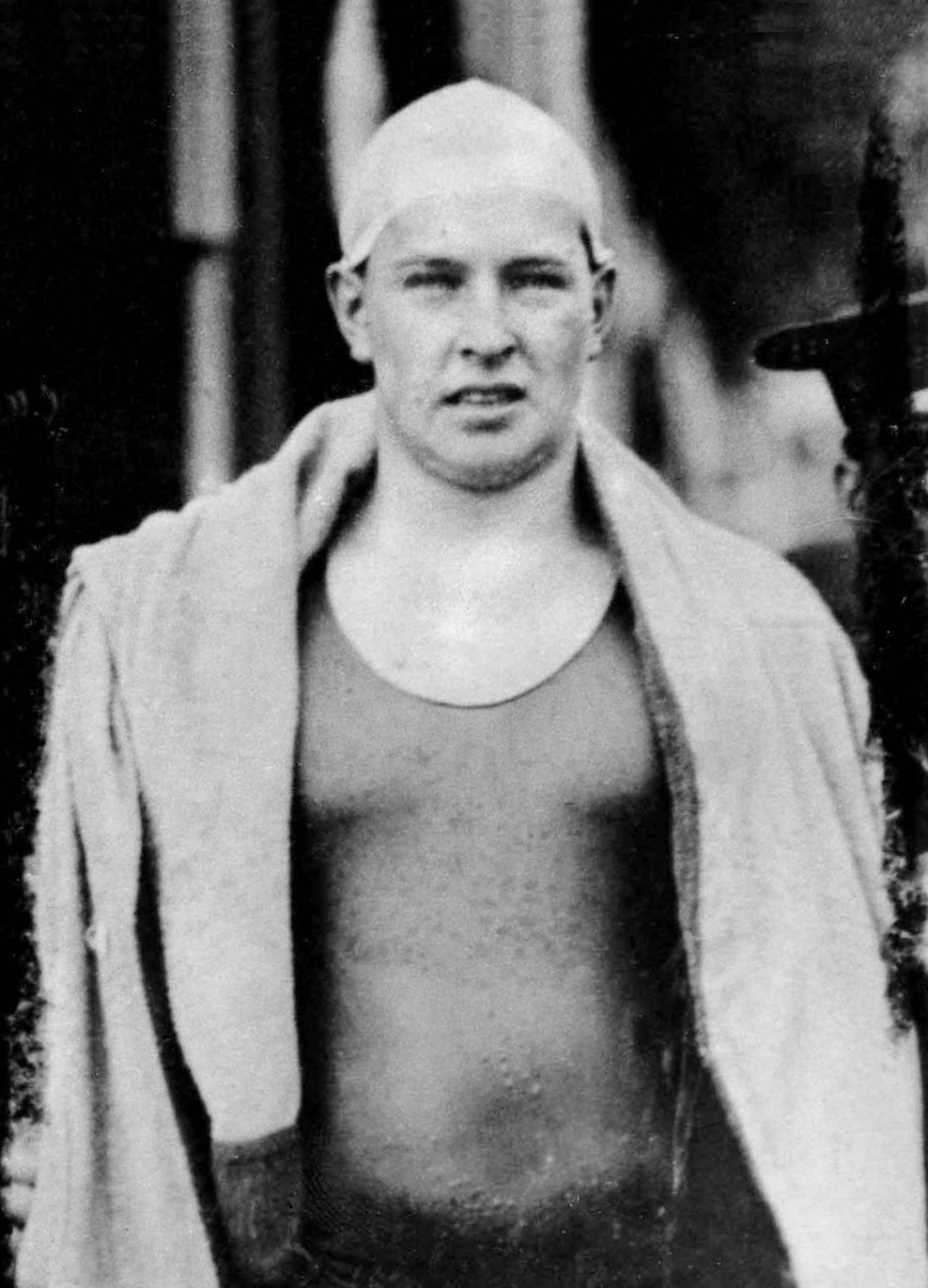
- Vernot in 1920

Personal information
- Full name: George Edward Vernot
- National team: Canada
- Born: February 27, 1901 Montreal, Quebec
- Died: November 22, 1962 (aged 61) Montreal, Quebec
- Height: 1.83 m (6 ft 0 in)
- Weight: 90 kg (200 lb)

Sport
- Sport: Swimming
- Strokes: Freestyle
- Club: Montreal Swim Club
- College team: McGill University
Medal record
Men's swimming
Representing Canada
Olympic Games
Silver medal – second place	1920 Antwerp	1500 m freestyle
Bronze medal – third place	1920 Antwerp	400 m freestyle

George Edward Vernot (February 27, 1901 – November 22, 1962) was a Canadian freestyle swimmer who competed at the 1920 and 1924 Olympics.

At the 1920 Summer Olympics in Antwerp, Vernot won a silver medal in the 1500-metre freestyle, and a bronze medal in the 400-metre event. He also competed in the 100-metre freestyle but placed third in his semifinal and did not advance. At the 1924 Summer Olympics in Paris, he was seventh in the 400-metre freestyle, and eighth in the 1500-metre freestyle.

Nationally, Vernot won the Canadian championships in the 100-, 220-, and 440-yard freestyle in 1919 and 220- and 440-yard in 1920. In 1926, he graduated in civil engineering from McGill University and retired from athletic competitions. He then worked for the City of Montreal, becoming chairman of the Board of Assessors in 1948. In 1969, a park in Montreal was named in his honor.

== See also ==
- List of McGill University people
- List of Olympic medalists in swimming (men)
