= Antonio Quarantotto =

Italian swimmer

Personal information
- Born: 11 June 1895 Vrsar, Istria, Austria-Hungary
- Died: 28 March 1987 (aged 91) Trieste, Italy

Sport
- Sport: Swimming

Antonio Quarantotto (11 June 1895 – 28 March 1987) was an Italian freestyle swimmer who competed in the 1920 Summer Olympics. In 1920 he was a member of the Italian relay team which finished fifth in the 4 x 200 metre freestyle relay competition. He also participated in the 400 metre freestyle event and in the 1500 metre freestyle competition but in both, he was eliminated in the first round.
