= Lily Beaurepaire =

Australian swimmer and diver

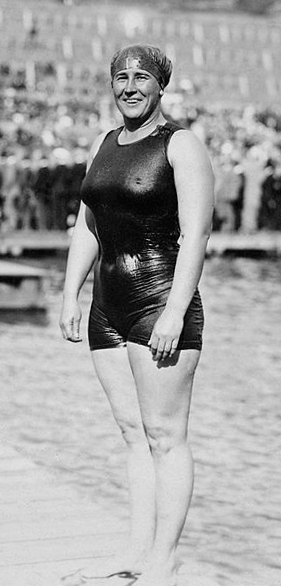
- Lily Beaurepaire at the 1920 Olympics

Personal information
- Full name: Lilian De Beaurepaire
- National team: Australia
- Born: 15 September 1892 Albert Park, Colony of Victoria
- Died: 24 November 1979 (aged 87) Geelong, Victoria, Australia

Sport
- Sport: Swimming
- Strokes: Freestyle

Lilian De Beaurepaire (15 September 1892 – 24 November 1979), also known by her married name Lilian Clarke, was an Australian swimmer and diver. She competed at the 1920 Summer Olympics in the 100-metre and 400-mete freestyle and plain high diving, but failed to reach the finals. Her brother Frank Beaurepaire was an Olympic swimmer.

She was the daughter of Francis Edmund de Beaurepaire, sailor, tram-conductor, trader, and (later) hotel proprietor, and his wife Mary Edith, née Inman. In 1936, she married Herbert Clarke.

The Lillian Beaurepaire Memorial Swimming Pool on the Lorne foreshore was opened by Melbourne City Councillor Ian Beaurepaire CMG in December 1967. For many years she was Lorne's only lifesaver.

She died on 24 November 1979 at Chesterfield Private Hospital, Geelong.
