= Gilio Bisagno =

Italian swimmer

Personal information
- Born: 31 January 1903 Sampierdarena, Italy
- Died: 16 December 1987 (aged 84)

Sport
- Sport: Swimming

Gilio Bisagno (31 January 1903 – 16 December 1987) was an Italian freestyle swimmer who competed in the 1920 Summer Olympics. He was born in Sampierdarena.

In 1920, he was a member of the Italian relay team, which finished fifth in the 4 x 200 metre freestyle relay competition. He also participated in the 400 metre freestyle event and in the 1500 metre freestyle competition, but in both, he was eliminated in the first round.
