= Ivan Stedman =

Australian swimmer

Personal information
- Full name: Ivan Cuthbert Stedman
- National team: Australia
- Born: 13 April 1895 Oakleigh, Victoria
- Died: 7 January 1979 (aged 83) Prahran, Victoria
- Height: 1.80 m (5 ft 11 in)

Sport
- Sport: Swimming
- Strokes: Freestyle
Medal record
Men's swimming
Representing Australia
Olympic Games
Silver medal – second place	1920 Antwerp	4×200m freestyle relay

Ivan Cuthbert Stedman (13 April 1895 – 7 January 1979) was an Australian freestyle and breaststroke swimmer of the 1920s, who won a silver medal in the 4×200-metre freestyle relay at the 1920 Summer Olympics in Antwerp, Belgium. He was born in Oakleigh, a suburb in Melbourne, Victoria.

After being injured in the Battle of the Somme during the First World War, Stedman was selected to carry the flag for Australasia at the Opening Ceremony of the 1920 Summer Olympics (Australia and New Zealand sent a combined team). In the 100-metre freestyle, Stedman was eliminated in the semifinals but made the final of the 200-metre breaststroke, where he came last of the five finalists. In an all-Australian team, Stedman combined with Henry Hay, William Herald and Frank Beaurepaire to claim silver in the 4×200-metre freestyle relay. The American team, led by Duke Kahanamoku, won by an extremely large margin of 21 seconds. Stedman also competed at the 1924 Summer Olympics in Paris, with less success, where he was eliminated in the semifinal of the 100-metre freestyle and the heats of the 200-metre breaststroke. Stedman was a regular competitor in the Race to Prince's Bridge, the annual three-mile Yarra River swim. In 1952, he won the race at age 52 with a time of 1 hour, 24 minutes, 53 seconds.

== See also ==
- List of Olympic medalists in swimming (men)

== Bibliography ==
- Andrews, Malcolm (2000). Australia at the Olympic Games. Sydney, New South Wales: ABC Books. p. 404. ISBN 0-7333-0884-8.
