= William Herald =

Australian swimmer

Personal information
- Full name: William Sharp Hannah Herald
- National team: Australia
- Born: 28 April 1900 Glebe, New South Wales
- Died: 13 February 1976 (aged 75)

Sport
- Sport: Swimming
- Strokes: Freestyle
- Club: Manly Swimming Club
Medal record
Men's swimming
Representing Australia
Olympic Games
| Silver medal – second place | 1920 Antwerp | 4×200 m freestyle relay |

William Sharp Hannah Herald (28 April 1900 – 13 February 1976) was an Australian freestyle swimmer of the 1910s and early 1920s, who won a silver medal in the 4×200-metre freestyle relay at the 1920 Summer Olympics in Antwerp, Belgium. He also competed in the 100-metre and 400-metre freestyle events.

Herald combined with Frank Beaurepaire, Henry Hay and Ivan Stedman to claim the silver medal in the 4×200-metre freestyle relay. The United States team, led by Duke Kahanamoku, won the gold, routing the Australians by 21 seconds. Due to the financial difficulties following the First World War, the swimming events were held in an open canal, without lane markings. Herald reached the final of the 100-metre freestyle, coming fifth, but claimed that fourth-placed American Norman Ross had fouled him during the race. Olympic officials ordered a re-race, and the placings were identical, except for Ross, who had won the 400-metre and 1500-metre events in the meantime and not bothered to enter the re-race.

== See also ==
- List of Olympic medalists in swimming (men)

== Sources ==
- Billy Herald – Olympic athlete profile at Sports-Reference.com
- Andrews, Malcolm (2000). Australia at the Olympic Games. Sydney, New South Wales: ABC Books. p. 204. ISBN 0-7333-0884-8.
