= Keith Kirkland =

Australian swimmer (1900–1971)

Personal information
- Full name: Keith Lindsay Hugh Kirkland
- National team: Australia
- Born: 22 October 1900 Cargo, New South Wales
- Died: 24 October 1971 (aged 71) Sydney

Sport
- Sport: Swimming
- Strokes: Freestyle

Keith Lindsay Hugh Kirkland (22 October 1900 – 24 October 1971) was an Australian freestyle swimmer who competed in the 1920 Summer Olympics in Antwerp, Belgium. He was born in Cargo, New South Wales and died in Sydney.

In 1920 he was eliminated in the semi-finals of the 100-metre freestyle event as well as of the 400-metre freestyle competition. He was also a member of the Australian relay team, which won the silver medal in the men's 4×200-metre freestyle relay event. He swam in the semi-finals and helped the team to qualify for the final, but he did not participate in the final and was not awarded a medal.
