= Percy Peter =

British swimmer

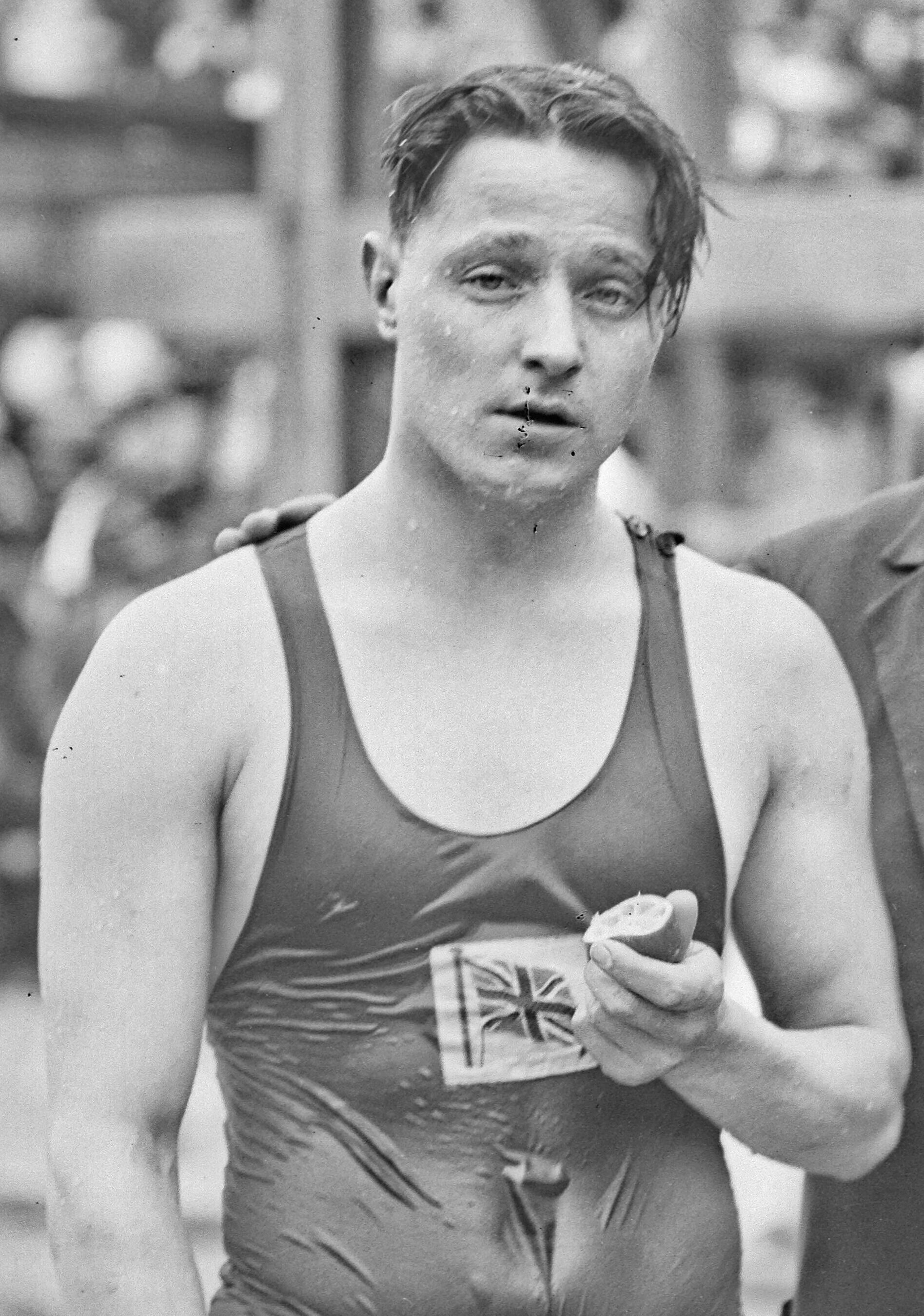
- Percy Peter in 1927

Personal information
- Full name: Edward Percival Peter
- National team: Great Britain
- Born: 28 March 1902 Kensington, London, England
- Died: 23 September 1986 (aged 84) Bournemouth, England

Sport
- Sport: Swimming
- Strokes: Freestyle, water polo
Medal record
Men's swimming
Representing Great Britain
Olympic Games
Bronze medal – third place	1920 Antwerp	4×200 m freestyle relay

Edward Percival Peter (28 March 1902 – 23 September 1986) was an English competitive swimmer and water polo player who represented Great Britain at the 1920, 1924 and 1928 Summer Olympics.

== Career ==
In 1920 he won a bronze medal in the 4×200-metre relay and failed to reach the 400-metre and 1500-metre freestyle finals. In 1924 he placed fifth in the 4×200-metre freestyle relay and third in the first round of 400-metre freestyle. In 1928 he finished sixth in the 4×200-metre freestyle relay; he was also a member of British water polo team, which lost to France in the third place match.
