= René Ricolfi-Doria =

Swiss swimmer (1901–1970)

Personal information
- Born: 30 April 1901 Cologny, Switzerland
- Died: 4 February 1970 (aged 68) Geneva, Switzerland

Sport
- Sport: Swimming

René Italo Ricolfi-Doria (30 April 1901 – 4 February 1970) was a Swiss freestyle swimmer. He competed in the two events and the water polo at the 1920 Summer Olympics. He was father of Marina Doria.
