= Alois Hrašek =

Czech swimmer

Personal information
- Full name: Alois Hrašek
- National team: Czechoslovakia
- Born: 25 April 1906 Prague, Austria-Hungary

Sport
- Sport: Swimming

Alois Hrašek (born 25 April 1906; date of death unknown) was a Czech swimmer. He competed for Czechoslovakia in two events at the 1920 Summer Olympics.
