= Lago di Val di Noci =

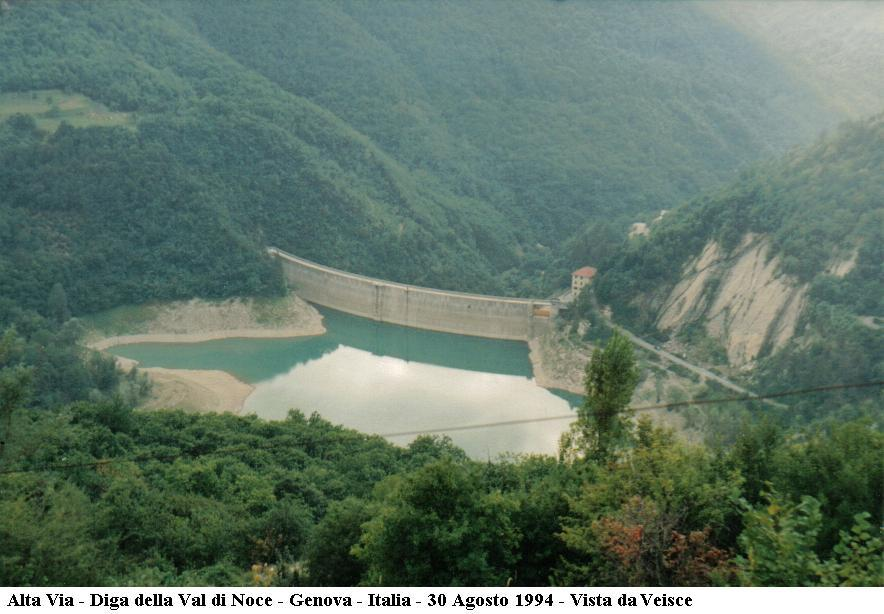

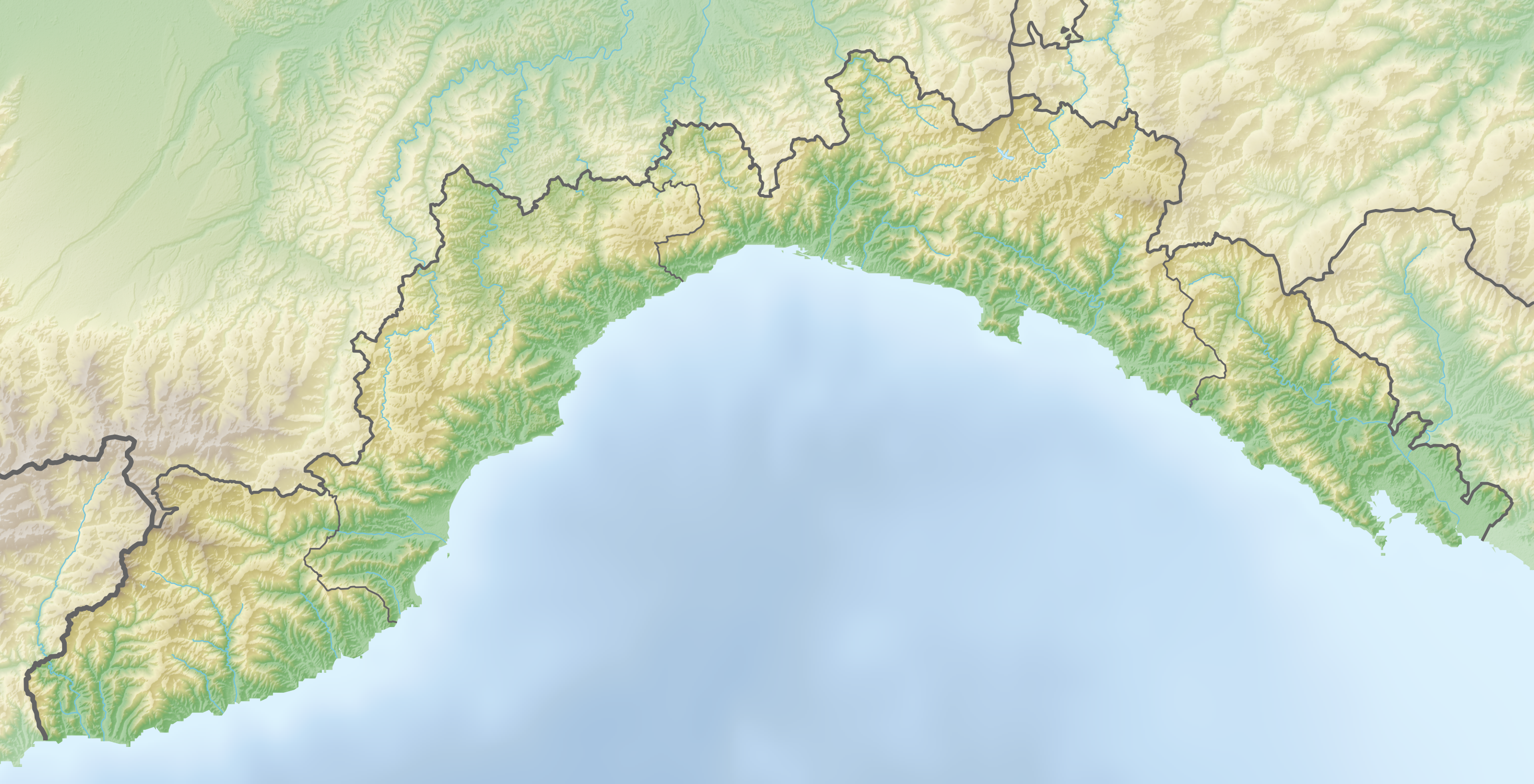
- Location within Liguria
- Location: Province of Genova, Liguria
- Coordinates: 44.493167°N 9.03773°E
- Type: reservoir
- Primary inflows: Rio Val di Noci
- Primary outflows: Rio Val di Noci
- Basin countries: Italy
- Surface elevation: 540 m (1,770 ft)

Lago di Val di Noci is a lake in the Province of Genova, Liguria, Italy.
