= Harry Hay (swimmer) =

Australian swimmer

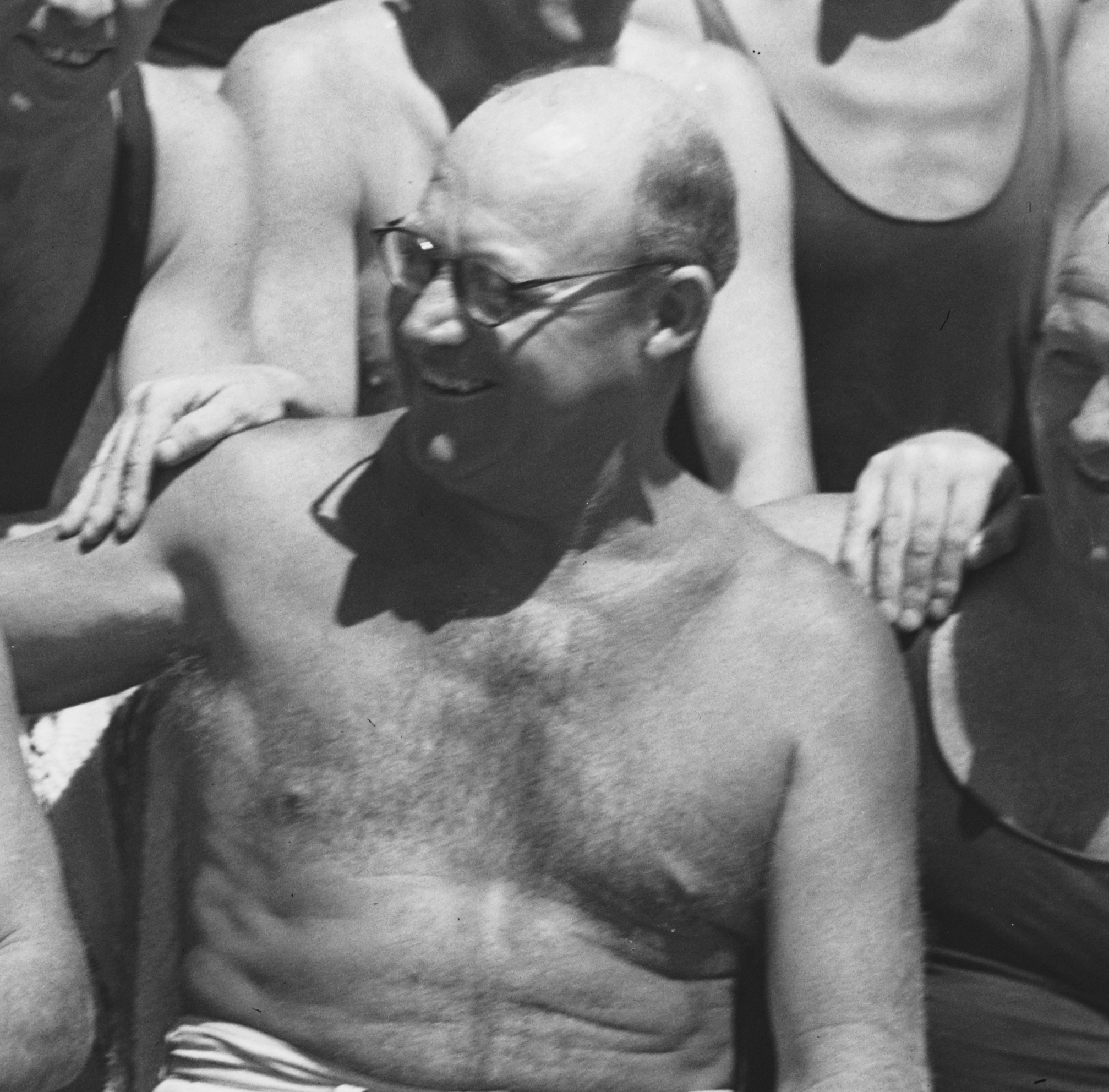
- Harry Hay in 1942

Personal information
- Full name: Harry Maitland Hay
- National team: Australia
- Born: 5 February 1893 Maitland, New South Wales
- Died: 30 March 1952 (aged 59) Manly, New South Wales

Sport
- Sport: Swimming
- Strokes: Freestyle
- Club: Manly Swimming Club
Medal record
Men's swimming
Representing Australia
Olympic Games
Silver medal – second place	1920 Antwerp	4×200 m freestyle relay

Harry Maitland Hay (5 February 1893 – 30 March 1952) was an Australian freestyle swimmer of the 1920s who won a silver medal in the 4 × 200 metre freestyle relay at the 1920 Summer Olympics in Antwerp. He later enjoyed success as a swimming coach, guiding Boy Charlton to Olympic gold.

Coming from the Manly Swimming Club based at Sid Eve's Baths, Hay combined with Frank Beaurepaire, William Herald and Ivan Stedman to claim the silver medal in the 4 × 200 metre freestyle relay at the 1920 Summer Olympics. The United States relay team, led by Duke Kahanamoku, routed the Australians by 21 seconds; in the heats four days earlier, the US team had only beaten them by three seconds. Hay also competed in the 100 metre freestyle where he reached the semifinals and the 400 metre freestyle but did not get past the first round.

Hay only once managed to win an Australian Championship, the 110yd title in 1922.

Hay later became a professional coach in Sydney and was seconded by Australian team managers at the Summer Olympics from 1924 to 1948. As it was deemed to be against the spirit of the Games to include coaches, Hay was officially given the title of team masseur. Les Duff, the manager of the Australian 1928 Summer Olympics team, paid Hay A$10 a week to train Charlton and backstroker Tom Boast.

Hay had arranged to travel to the 1952 Summer Olympics in Helsinki to look after the Australian swimmers but suffered a fatal heart attack just a month before leaving.

== See also ==
- List of Olympic medalists in swimming (men)
