= Beryl Beaurepaire =

Australian political activist and feminist (1923–2018)

Dame Beryl Beaurepaire AC DBE
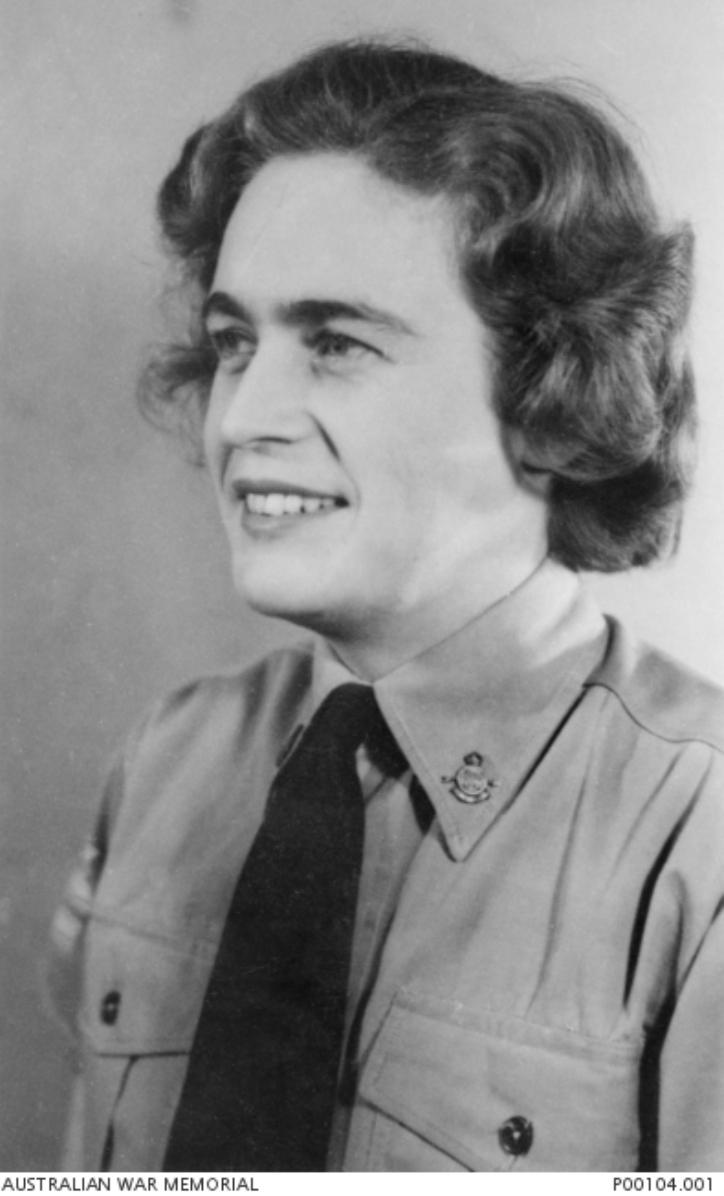
- Serving in the WAAAF in 1944
- Born: Beryl Edith Bedggood; 24 September 1923; Camberwell, Victoria
- Died: 24 October 2018 (aged 95)
- Occupations: Political activist; feminist; philanthropist
- Known for: On the Victorian Honour Roll of Women
- Spouse: Ian Francis Beaurepaire (m. 1946; died 1996)
- Children: 2

Dame Beryl Edith Beaurepaire, AC DBE (née Bedggood; 24 September 1923 – 24 October 2018) was an Australian political activist, feminist and philanthropist.

== Early life and career ==
Beryl Edith Bedggood was born in Camberwell, Victoria, to a middle-class family who ran a shoe manufacturing company. She was educated at Fintona Girls' School. She served as a meteorological officer in the Women's Auxiliary Australian Air Force from early 1942 to late 1945.

In 1946, she married Ian Francis Beaurepaire (1922–1996); the couple had twin sons. Ian Beaurepaire, CMG was Lord Mayor of Melbourne from 1965 to 1967. Her father-in-law, Sir Frank Beaurepaire, had also been Lord Mayor from 1940 to 1942.

== Charity and political work ==
Beaurepaire was a member of the YWCA Australia national executive from 1969 to 1977. She was Vice-President of the Citizens Welfare Service Victoria from 1970 to 1986 and Chairman of the Board of Management of Fintona Girls School from 1973 to 1987.

From 1974 to 1976, she served as Chairman of the Federal Women's Committee of the Liberal Party of Australia, vice-president of the Victorian Division of the Liberal Party from 1976 to 1986, and convener of the first National Women's Advisory Council from 1978 to 1982.

In 1999, when the Convention on the Elimination of All Forms of Discrimination Against Women (CEDAW) was supplemented by an Optional Protocol to create a mechanism allowing individual claims of violations to be made to the CEDAW Committee, and by a procedure enabling the committee to initiate inquiries into situations of grave or systematic violations of women's rights, Dame Beryl publicly opposed the Government's decision not to sign or ratify that Protocol.

From 1985 to 1993, she was Chair of the Australian War Memorial Council and in 1993 Chair of the Australian War Memorial Fund Raising Committee.

Beaurepaire served on a number of boards, including as a member of the Australian Children's Television Foundation Board from 1982 to 1988, a member of the Board of Victoria's 150th Authority from 1982 to 1987, and a member of the Australian Bi-centennial Multicultural Foundation from 1989 to 1992. Dame Beryl was also a member and the Chair of the Patrons Council of the Epilepsy Foundation of Victoria.

She was Patron to a number of community organisations including Children First Foundation since 2000, Peninsula Hospice Service since 1999, Palliative Care (Vic.) since 1999, Victorian College of the Arts since 1999, Epilepsy Foundation of Victoria since 1999, Australians Against Child Abuse since 1999, Peninsula Health Care Network Foundation since 1996 and the Portsea Children's Camp since 1996.

She died on 24 October 2018, aged 95.

== Honours ==
Beaurepaire was appointed an Officer of the Order of the British Empire in 1975 and made a Dame Commander of the order in 1981. In 1977 she was awarded the Silver Jubilee medal. In 1991 she was appointed a Companion of the Order of Australia. In 2001 she was presented with the Centenary Medal as well as being inducted into the Victorian Honour Roll of Women.

== Sources ==
- McKernan, Michael, Beryl Beaurepaire, University of Queensland Press, St Lucia, Qld, 1999.
