= Stade Nautique d'Antwerp =

Aquatics venue in Antwerp, Belgium

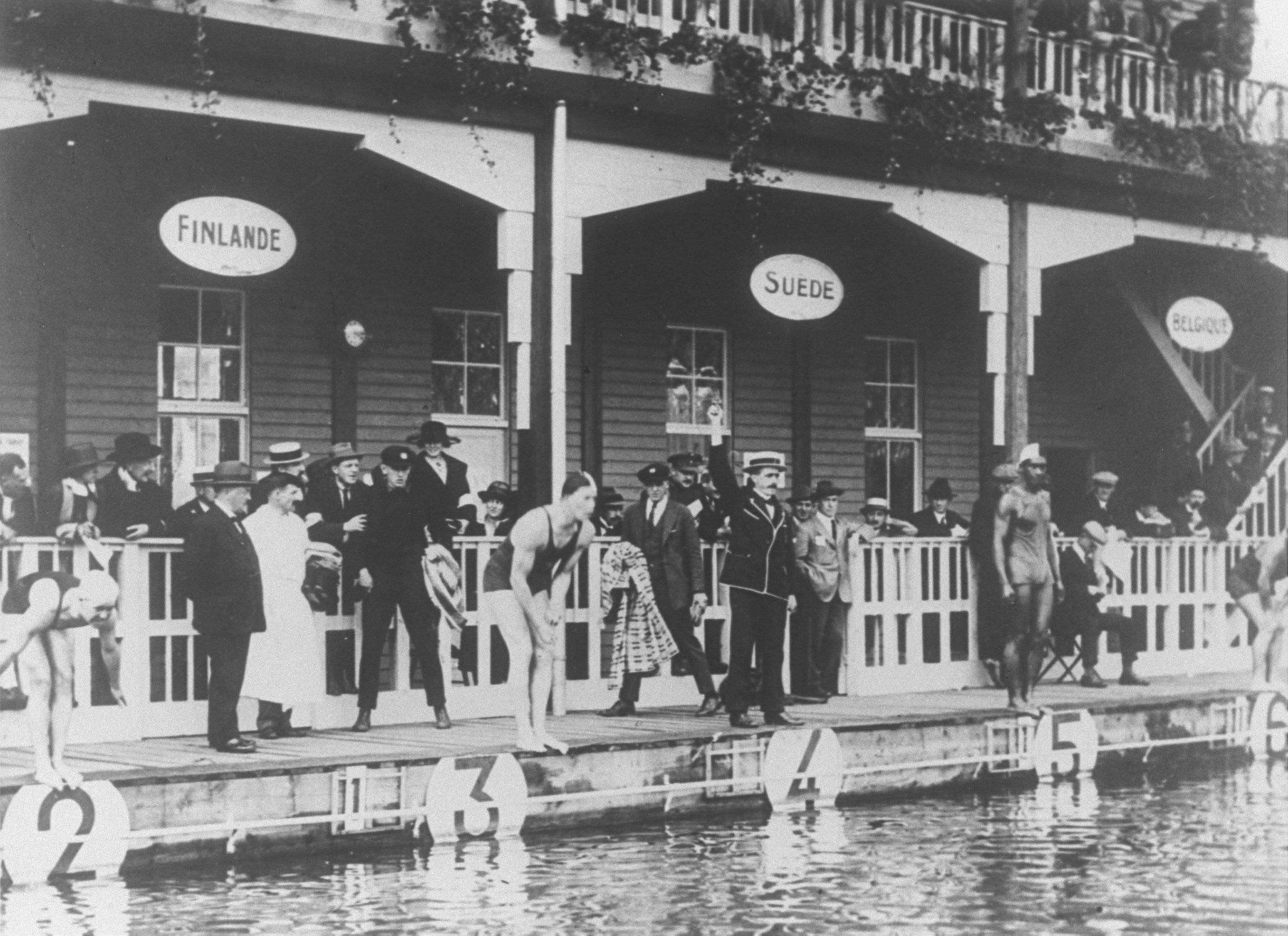
Inside the aquatic centre during the 1920 Summer Olympics.

Stade Nautique d'Antwerp (Dutch:Zwemstadion van Antwerpen) was an aquatics venue located in Antwerp, Belgium. For the 1920 Summer Olympics, it hosted the diving, swimming, and water polo.

This was the first structure devoted to the aquatics events for the Summer Olympics.

During the swimming events, the water was described as cold and very dark, so much so that the swimmers had to be warmed up after every event. Diving events were held in the middle of the pool, with the divers themselves describing the water as cold and dark.
