= Harold Annison =

British swimmer

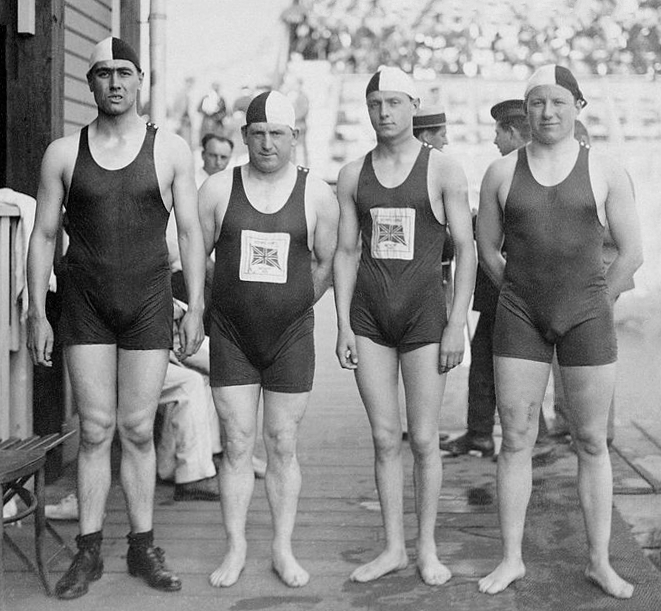
- British 4×200 m team at 1920 Olympics; Annison first on left.

Personal information
- Full name: Harold Edward Annison
- National team: Great Britain
- Born: 27 December 1895 Hackney, London, England
- Died: 27 November 1957 (aged 61) Worthing, England

Sport
- Sport: Swimming
- Strokes: Freestyle
- Club: Croydon Swimming Club
Medal record
Men's swimming
Representing Great Britain
Olympic Games
Bronze medal – third place	1920 Antwerp	4×200 m freestyle relay

Harold Edward Annison (27 December 1895 – 27 November 1957) was an English competitive swimmer, water polo player, and Olympic medallist who represented Great Britain in international competition.

He competed in the 1920 and 1924 Summer Olympics. In the 1920 Antwerp Olympics he won a bronze medal in the men's 4×200-metre freestyle relay, and was fourth in his first heat of the 100-metre freestyle event, fifth in the semifinal of 400-metre freestyle event, and third in the semifinal of 1500-metre freestyle event, but did not advance in any event.

Four years later, at the 1924 Paris Olympics, he was eighth in the 400-metre freestyle event, ninth in the 1500-metre freestyle event, and fifth in the 4×200-metre freestyle relay event. He was also a member of the British water polo team, which lost to Hungary in the first round and did not advance.

== See also ==
- List of Olympic medalists in swimming (men)
