= Norman Ross =

American swimmer

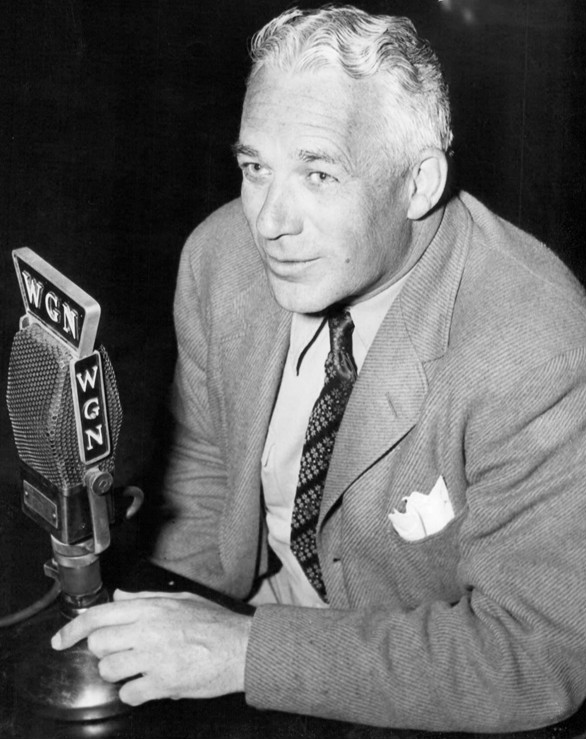
- Ross broadcasting for WGN Radio, Chicago.

Personal information
- Full name: Norman DeMille Ross
- Nickname: "The Big Moose"
- National team: United States
- Born: May 2, 1895 Portland, Oregon, U.S.
- Died: June 19, 1953 (aged 58) Evanston, Illinois, U.S.
- Height: 6 ft 2 in (1.88 m)

Sport
- Sport: Swimming
- Strokes: Freestyle, water polo
- Club: Illinois Athletic Club
- College team: Stanford University
Medal record
Men's swimming
Representing the United States
Olympic Games
| Gold medal – first place | 1920 Antwerp | 400 m freestyle |
| Gold medal – first place | 1920 Antwerp | 1500 m freestyle |
| Gold medal – first place | 1920 Antwerp | 4x200 m freestyle relay |
Inter-Allied Games
| Gold medal – first place | 1919 Paris | 100 m backstroke |
| Gold medal – first place | 1919 Paris | 100 m freestyle |
| Gold medal – first place | 1919 Paris | 400 m freestyle |
| Gold medal – first place | 1919 Paris | 800 m freestyle |
| Gold medal – first place | 1919 Paris | 1500 m freestyle |

Norman DeMille Ross (May 2, 1895 – June 19, 1953) was an American competition swimmer who won five events at the Inter-Allied Games in June 1919, held at Joinville-Le-Pont near Paris, and three gold medals at the 1920 Summer Olympics in Antwerp, Belgium. He set thirteen world records and won eighteen U.S. national championships during his career.

In later years he was a popular Chicago radio personality known to listeners as "Uncle Normie." His son, Norman A Ross Jr. (1922–2008), was a well-known radio and television host, corporate executive and civic leader in Chicago.

== See also ==
- List of members of the International Swimming Hall of Fame
- List of multiple Olympic gold medalists
- List of Olympic medalists in swimming (men)
- World record progression 200 metres freestyle
- World record progression 400 metres freestyle
- World record progression 800 metres freestyle
- World record progression 4 × 200 metres freestyle relay
- Mutiny of the Matoika

Records
| Preceded by Charles Daniels | Men's 200-meter freestyle world record-holder (long course); November 24, 1916 – April 10, 1920 | Succeeded by Tedford H. Cann |
| Preceded by Jack Hatfield | Men's 400-meter freestyle world record-holder (long course); October 9, 1919 – April 9, 1922 | Succeeded by Arne Borg |
| Preceded by Henry Taylor | Men's 800-meter freestyle world record-holder (long course); January 10, 1920 – January 13, 1923 | Succeeded by Boy Charlton |
