= Frank Beaurepaire =

Australian swimmer, politician and businessman

Sir Francis Joseph Edmund Beaurepaire
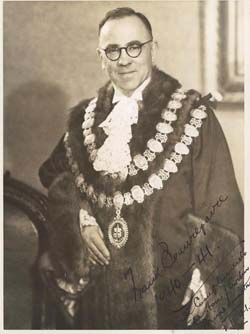

66th Lord Mayor of Melbourne
- In office 1940–1942
- Preceded by: Arthur Coles
- Succeeded by: Sir Thomas Sydney Nettlefold

Personal details
- Born: 13 May 1891 Melbourne, Australia
- Died: 29 May 1956 (aged 65)

Frank Beaurepaire
Medal record

Representing Australasia

Men's swimming
Silver medal – second place	1908 London	400m freestyle
Bronze medal – third place	1908 London	1500 m freestyle

Representing Australia
Silver medal – second place	1920 Antwerp	4×200 m freestyle
Bronze medal – third place	1920 Antwerp	1500 m freestyle
Silver medal – second place	1924 Paris	4×200 m freestyle
Bronze medal – third place	1924 Paris	1500 m freestyle

Sir Francis Joseph Edmund Beaurepaire (13 May 1891 – 29 May 1956) was an Australian distance freestyle swimmer from the 1900s to the 1920s, who won three silver and three bronze medals, from the 1908 Summer Olympics in London to the 1924 Summer Olympics in Paris.

He was also a decorated politician and businessman, serving for ten years in the Victorian Legislative Council and as Lord Mayor of Melbourne and building a multimillion-dollar tyre business empire, Beaurepaires.

== Early life ==
Beaurepaire was born to Francis Edmund de Beaurepaire, a cable tram conductor, and Mary Edith Inman. Growing up in Melbourne, Beaurepaire was educated at Albert Park State School and Wesley College.

He had his first swimming lesson at the age of four, when his father dropped him into the sea water baths at South Melbourne with a rope tied around his waist. He often practised in the sea, close to where effluent was ejected into Port Phillip Bay. Later, when he had earned more money, he paid tuppence (2d. = two pence) to enter the now demolished Stubbs' South Melbourne Baths to train.

His career was nearly ended when he was hospitalized for 12 months with rheumatic fever. However, encouraged by his schoolteacher and South Melbourne barber Tommy Horlock, who later became his coach, Beaurepaire fought off the ailment and resumed training with the Albert Park State School Swimming Club.

== Swimming career ==
In 1906, a few months before his 15th birthday, Beaurepaire won the 220 yd (200 m) and 440 yd (400 m) freestyle at the Victorian championships. In 1908, he captured the 440 yd (400 m), 880 yd and mile freestyle events at the Australian Championships to claim a spot in the 1908 Summer Olympics team. On arrival in London with Horlock, he found that no arrangements had been made to pick them up, so they were forced to live with 16 pounds between them for a month, before officials became aware of their plight.

Beaurepaire trained in London for three months before the Games. Unable to afford admission to swimming pools, He was forced to train at Highgate Ponds, at temperatures of 10 °C. After a 15-mile (24 km) event in the River Thames prior to the Olympics he was numbed by the cold to such an extent that he collapsed and needed to be pulled from the water to avoid drowning. Later he won the 880 yd (800 m) British Championship at Bradford, defeating Henry Taylor of Lancashire, and then proceeded to win the 220 yd (200 m) event at Nottingham.

Arriving at the Olympics, the competitors were confronted with a pool dug into the athletics track, with no filtration or chlorination, effectively being a muddy pond. Beaurepaire had caught influenza and finished in second and third in the 400 m and 1500 m freestyle respectively, both events being won by Taylor. He was eliminated in the heats of the 100 m freestyle. He also finished fourth in the 4 × 200 m freestyle relay. After the Olympics, Beaurepaire again raced Taylor over 500 yd (460 m) and one mile (1.6 km) in Britain, winning the latter, in which some 20,000 spectators attended.

Returning to Australia, he broke the 300 yd (270 m) world record at the Melbourne City Baths. He reappeared prominently in 1910 when he won more than a dozen state and national titles, breaking the world 220 yd (200 m) freestyle record in the process. His tour of the United Kingdom and continental Europe later that year resulted in world records in the 200 m, 300 m, 300 yd (270 m), 400 m, 500 m and 1,000 yd (910 m), three of which were achieved in one race. He later swept all of the British championships from 100 yd (91 m) up to one mile (1.6 km). He competed in 41 first-class and championship races in four months, winning all of them.

In 1911, after his long return by sea to Australia, he suffered his first defeat in three years and was forced to abandon the 440 yd (400 m) freestyle event at the Australian Championships mid-race. Due to exhaustion, he took a break from competitive swimming to become a swimming instructor, earning 3 pounds 10 shillings (£3/10/-) a week with the Victorian Department of Education as a physical education instructor.

He was barred from Olympic competition by the International Swimming Federation, which ruled him to be a professional, although he was not earning money for swimming. This ruled him out of the 1912 Summer Olympics in Stockholm, where the Australian 4 × 200 m freestyle relay team won gold. The decision to bar him was reversed in 1914.

He joined the Australian Defence Force as an infantryman, but was invalided and joined the YMCA services, and served in Egypt, England and France before being hospitalized in 1917 with trench fever and gassing, and being returned to Australia.

In February 1920, he won the Victorian championships, and soon after broke the 1000 m world record and qualified for the 1920 Summer Olympics in Antwerp. With swimming held in a near-freezing open-water canal, Beaurepaire abandoned the 400 m freestyle mid-race due to illness, but managed to claim a bronze in the 1500 m freestyle. He combined with William Herald, Ivan Stedman and Henry Hay to claim the silver medal in the 4 × 200 m freestyle relay, some 21 s behind the American squad.

His sister Lily also competed as part of the swimming and diving team, becoming the first brother-sister combination to represent Australia at the Summer Olympics.

Back in Australia and later in Hawaii that year, he broke the 1,000 yd (910 m) and one mile (1.6 km) records, and twice broke the 1000 m and 1500 m records. He was named as the captain of the swimming team for the 1924 Summer Olympics in Paris. He was eliminated in the heats of the 400 m freestyle, but at the age of 34 he claimed bronze in the 1500 m freestyle, behind fellow Australian Boy Charlton and Sweden's Arne Borg. He won a silver medal in the 4 × 200 m freestyle relay alongside Charlton, Ernest Henry and Moss Christie.

His last competitive appearance was his victory at Kew in the State Championships in March 1928, which he won at 37 years of age. In all he set 15 world records over a span of 13 years, winning 79 Victorian titles, 11 British titles and a record 34 Australian titles. It was not until 2000 that Susie O'Neill broke his Australian record.

He attended the 1932 Summer Olympics as a swimming official and judge. In 2025, he was inducted into Swimming Australia Hall of Fame.

== Beaurepaires ==
In 1922, he was awarded the Royal Humane Society Gold Medal and £550, a significant sum in that era, after assisting another lifesaver, Jack Chalmers in rescuing a shark attack victim at Coogee, New South Wales, a suburb of Sydney. He used this to start Beaurepaires, a tyres, wheels, batteries business, which had assets worth more than 8 million pounds at his death. The business now has over 230 stores in Australia.

== Local, state and federal politics ==
From 1940 to 1942, Beaurepaire was the Lord Mayor of Melbourne. He was knighted in the King's Birthday Honours of 1942.

He was elected to the Victorian Legislative Council in 1942, serving until 1952. He was an unsuccessful candidate for Senate for the United Australia Party in the 1943 federal election.

In 1948 he was part of a delegation that went to London to lobby at the 1948 Summer Olympics for Melbourne to host the 1956 Summer Olympics. In 1949 Melbourne won the hosting rights and Beaurepaire was again re-elected as Lord Mayor. He hoped that he could preside over the Games. However, he died of a heart attack in the barber's chair at the Hotel Windsor, just seven months before the Games. His son, Ian Francis Beaurepaire, was also a Lord Mayor of Melbourne.

== See also ==
- List of members of the International Swimming Hall of Fame
- List of Olympic medalists in swimming (men)
- 1916 Pioneer Exhibition Game
- World record progression 200 metres freestyle
