= List of minor planets: 595001–596000 =

The following is a partial list of minor planets, running from minor-planet number 595001 through 596000, inclusive. The primary data for this and other partial lists is based on JPL's "Small-Body Orbital Elements" and data available from the Minor Planet Center. Critical list information is also provided by the MPC, unless otherwise specified from Lowell Observatory. A detailed description of the table's columns and additional sources are given on the main page including a complete list of every page in this series, and a statistical break-up on the dynamical classification of minor planets.

Also see the summary list of all named bodies in numerical and alphabetical order, and the corresponding naming citations for the number range of this particular list. New namings may only be added to this list after official publication, as the preannouncement of names is condemned by the Working Group for Small Bodies Nomenclature of the International Astronomical Union.

Near-Earth obj.	MBA (inner)	MBA (outer)	Centaur
Mars-crosser	MBA (middle)	Jupiter trojan	Trans-Neptunian obj.
Unclassified

== 595001–595100 ==
Designation			Discovery			Properties		Ref
Permanent	Provisional	Named after	Date	Site	Discoverer(s)	Category	Diam.	Ref
595001	2000 RE_{37}	—	September 3, 2000	Socorro	LINEAR	PHO	890 m	MPC · JPL
595002	2000 RJ_{109}	—	March 19, 2009	Mount Lemmon	Mount Lemmon Survey	·	520 m	MPC · JPL
595003	2000 SU_{192}	—	September 24, 2000	Socorro	LINEAR	·	660 m	MPC · JPL
595004	2000 SE_{377}	—	September 23, 2000	Anderson Mesa	LONEOS	T_{j} (2.99)	3.3 km	MPC · JPL
595005	2000 SV_{377}	—	January 23, 2015	Haleakala	Pan-STARRS 1	MAR	940 m	MPC · JPL
595006	2000 SC_{378}	—	November 2, 2013	Kitt Peak	Spacewatch	·	1.3 km	MPC · JPL
595007	2000 SK_{378}	—	March 1, 2008	Kitt Peak	Spacewatch	·	1.7 km	MPC · JPL
595008	2000 SO_{378}	—	February 15, 2013	Haleakala	Pan-STARRS 1	·	1.6 km	MPC · JPL
595009	2000 ST_{378}	—	September 14, 2007	Mount Lemmon	Mount Lemmon Survey	·	550 m	MPC · JPL
595010	2000 SS_{379}	—	November 18, 2007	Mount Lemmon	Mount Lemmon Survey	·	620 m	MPC · JPL
595011	2000 SL_{380}	—	September 21, 2000	Kitt Peak	Deep Ecliptic Survey	·	510 m	MPC · JPL
595012	2000 SM_{382}	—	October 3, 2011	Mount Lemmon	Mount Lemmon Survey	V	490 m	MPC · JPL
595013	2000 SZ_{382}	—	July 12, 2015	Haleakala	Pan-STARRS 1	·	1.7 km	MPC · JPL
595014	2000 SP_{383}	—	September 19, 2014	Haleakala	Pan-STARRS 1	·	570 m	MPC · JPL
595015	2000 SN_{385}	—	August 28, 2011	Haleakala	Pan-STARRS 1	MAS	620 m	MPC · JPL
595016	2000 SG_{386}	—	October 15, 2012	Haleakala	Pan-STARRS 1	L5	8.5 km	MPC · JPL
595017	2000 TB_{1}	—	October 1, 2000	Socorro	LINEAR	·	730 m	MPC · JPL
595018	2000 TY_{33}	—	October 4, 2000	Bergisch Gladbach	W. Bickel	·	620 m	MPC · JPL
595019	2000 TN_{71}	—	October 3, 2000	Kitt Peak	Spacewatch	·	1.3 km	MPC · JPL
595020	2000 TN_{75}	—	December 10, 2009	Mount Lemmon	Mount Lemmon Survey	·	1.3 km	MPC · JPL
595021	2000 TU_{76}	—	January 26, 2006	Kitt Peak	Spacewatch	·	1.1 km	MPC · JPL
595022	2000 TJ_{77}	—	October 11, 2012	Mount Lemmon	Mount Lemmon Survey	L5	8.1 km	MPC · JPL
595023	2000 TD_{78}	—	October 10, 2012	Haleakala	Pan-STARRS 1	·	2.7 km	MPC · JPL
595024	2000 TW_{79}	—	January 20, 2015	Haleakala	Pan-STARRS 1	·	1.2 km	MPC · JPL
595025	2000 TY_{79}	—	November 24, 2011	Mount Lemmon	Mount Lemmon Survey	NYS	600 m	MPC · JPL
595026	2000 TW_{80}	—	March 27, 2011	Mount Lemmon	Mount Lemmon Survey	·	1.2 km	MPC · JPL
595027	2000 UP_{85}	—	October 31, 2000	Socorro	LINEAR	·	780 m	MPC · JPL
595028	2000 UM_{115}	—	October 6, 2008	Mount Lemmon	Mount Lemmon Survey	·	1.1 km	MPC · JPL
595029	2000 UY_{115}	—	May 26, 2015	Haleakala	Pan-STARRS 1	·	2.8 km	MPC · JPL
595030	2000 UE_{116}	—	October 26, 2000	Kitt Peak	Spacewatch	·	1.2 km	MPC · JPL
595031	2000 VD_{21}	—	November 1, 2000	Socorro	LINEAR	·	1.6 km	MPC · JPL
595032	2000 WH_{52}	—	November 27, 2000	Kitt Peak	Spacewatch	·	1.8 km	MPC · JPL
595033	2000 WS_{199}	—	February 10, 2014	Haleakala	Pan-STARRS 1	·	1.4 km	MPC · JPL
595034	2000 WV_{199}	—	January 13, 2011	Mount Lemmon	Mount Lemmon Survey	·	500 m	MPC · JPL
595035	2000 WX_{202}	—	September 14, 2007	Mount Lemmon	Mount Lemmon Survey	·	660 m	MPC · JPL
595036	2000 WZ_{202}	—	November 6, 2016	Mount Lemmon	Mount Lemmon Survey	·	2.1 km	MPC · JPL
595037	2000 WQ_{203}	—	March 15, 2012	Mount Lemmon	Mount Lemmon Survey	·	580 m	MPC · JPL
595038	2000 WW_{204}	—	October 11, 2005	Kitt Peak	Spacewatch	·	2.1 km	MPC · JPL
595039	2000 XT_{55}	—	February 9, 2005	Mount Lemmon	Mount Lemmon Survey	·	750 m	MPC · JPL
595040	2000 YB_{19}	—	December 21, 2000	Kitt Peak	Spacewatch	·	1.0 km	MPC · JPL
595041	2000 YH_{19}	—	December 21, 2000	Kitt Peak	Spacewatch	·	1.8 km	MPC · JPL
595042	2000 YD_{144}	—	August 27, 2003	Palomar	NEAT	·	750 m	MPC · JPL
595043	2000 YK_{144}	—	January 30, 2014	Kitt Peak	Spacewatch	HNS	1.2 km	MPC · JPL
595044	2000 YR_{144}	—	May 3, 2008	Kitt Peak	Spacewatch	·	2.4 km	MPC · JPL
595045	2000 YX_{144}	—	December 25, 2000	Kitt Peak	Spacewatch	·	600 m	MPC · JPL
595046	2001 AO_{19}	—	December 21, 2000	Bohyunsan	Bohyunsan	·	1.4 km	MPC · JPL
595047	2001 AT_{54}	—	January 4, 2001	Haleakala	NEAT	·	920 m	MPC · JPL
595048	2001 BB_{12}	—	January 19, 2001	Kitt Peak	Spacewatch	·	2.2 km	MPC · JPL
595049	2001 BJ_{21}	—	December 29, 2000	Haleakala	NEAT	·	1.8 km	MPC · JPL
595050	2001 BB_{84}	—	January 20, 2009	Mount Lemmon	Mount Lemmon Survey	·	990 m	MPC · JPL
595051	2001 BA_{85}	—	April 1, 2013	Mount Lemmon	Mount Lemmon Survey	THM	1.9 km	MPC · JPL
595052	2001 CE_{37}	—	February 13, 2001	Kitt Peak	Spacewatch	·	1.5 km	MPC · JPL
595053	2001 CH_{50}	—	August 1, 2016	Haleakala	Pan-STARRS 1	·	1.3 km	MPC · JPL
595054	2001 CR_{50}	—	February 2, 2001	Kitt Peak	Spacewatch	L4	8.5 km	MPC · JPL
595055	2001 CD_{51}	—	February 2, 2001	Kitt Peak	Spacewatch	·	1.6 km	MPC · JPL
595056	2001 DD_{1}	—	February 16, 2001	Kitt Peak	Spacewatch	·	2.6 km	MPC · JPL
595057	2001 DV_{56}	—	February 16, 2001	Kitt Peak	Spacewatch	EOS	1.8 km	MPC · JPL
595058	2001 DC_{82}	—	February 22, 2001	Kitt Peak	Spacewatch	·	2.8 km	MPC · JPL
595059	2001 DL_{111}	—	August 31, 2005	Kitt Peak	Spacewatch	·	720 m	MPC · JPL
595060	2001 DB_{112}	—	May 15, 2005	Mount Lemmon	Mount Lemmon Survey	·	1.1 km	MPC · JPL
595061	2001 DP_{112}	—	February 15, 2010	Kitt Peak	Spacewatch	·	1.2 km	MPC · JPL
595062	2001 DT_{112}	—	March 15, 2004	Kitt Peak	Spacewatch	L4	8.5 km	MPC · JPL
595063	2001 DO_{113}	—	May 14, 2015	Haleakala	Pan-STARRS 1	·	2.3 km	MPC · JPL
595064	2001 DD_{116}	—	February 1, 2012	Kitt Peak	Spacewatch	·	2.7 km	MPC · JPL
595065	2001 DF_{117}	—	January 20, 2018	Haleakala	Pan-STARRS 1	URS	2.4 km	MPC · JPL
595066	2001 DJ_{117}	—	November 28, 2016	Haleakala	Pan-STARRS 1	·	2.6 km	MPC · JPL
595067	2001 DS_{117}	—	March 13, 2007	Mount Lemmon	Mount Lemmon Survey	·	2.3 km	MPC · JPL
595068	2001 DQ_{118}	—	March 20, 2007	Mount Lemmon	Mount Lemmon Survey	·	2.0 km	MPC · JPL
595069	2001 DL_{119}	—	October 29, 2008	Mount Lemmon	Mount Lemmon Survey	L4	8.2 km	MPC · JPL
595070	2001 DZ_{119}	—	January 2, 2012	Mount Lemmon	Mount Lemmon Survey	·	2.3 km	MPC · JPL
595071	2001 EG_{15}	—	March 15, 2001	Kitt Peak	Spacewatch	·	940 m	MPC · JPL
595072	2001 EP_{27}	—	April 22, 2007	Kitt Peak	Spacewatch	·	2.5 km	MPC · JPL
595073	2001 EB_{28}	—	February 3, 2012	Mount Lemmon	Mount Lemmon Survey	·	1.1 km	MPC · JPL
595074	2001 FL_{197}	—	March 18, 2007	Kitt Peak	Spacewatch	·	2.1 km	MPC · JPL
595075	2001 FT_{197}	—	March 19, 2001	Kitt Peak	Spacewatch	·	1.7 km	MPC · JPL
595076	2001 FB_{199}	—	January 13, 2008	Kitt Peak	Spacewatch	·	650 m	MPC · JPL
595077	2001 FG_{203}	—	August 15, 2009	Kitt Peak	Spacewatch	·	3.0 km	MPC · JPL
595078	2001 FO_{206}	—	March 21, 2001	Kitt Peak	SKADS	·	1.0 km	MPC · JPL
595079	2001 FC_{214}	—	March 25, 2001	Kitt Peak	Deep Ecliptic Survey	JUN	600 m	MPC · JPL
595080	2001 FD_{215}	—	February 12, 2004	Kitt Peak	Spacewatch	·	550 m	MPC · JPL
595081	2001 FG_{228}	—	March 23, 2001	Kitt Peak	SKADS	HYG	2.3 km	MPC · JPL
595082	2001 FD_{235}	—	March 25, 2001	Kitt Peak	Deep Ecliptic Survey	·	1.4 km	MPC · JPL
595083	2001 FB_{244}	—	November 6, 2010	Mount Lemmon	Mount Lemmon Survey	·	1.3 km	MPC · JPL
595084	2001 FK_{244}	—	December 5, 2005	Mount Lemmon	Mount Lemmon Survey	·	2.2 km	MPC · JPL
595085	2001 FZ_{244}	—	November 20, 2008	Kitt Peak	Spacewatch	·	1.7 km	MPC · JPL
595086	2001 FO_{245}	—	December 27, 2011	Mount Lemmon	Mount Lemmon Survey	·	2.7 km	MPC · JPL
595087	2001 FV_{245}	—	March 1, 2008	Kitt Peak	Spacewatch	·	660 m	MPC · JPL
595088	2001 FF_{246}	—	October 8, 2004	Kitt Peak	Spacewatch	VER	2.9 km	MPC · JPL
595089	2001 FN_{247}	—	October 22, 2009	Mount Lemmon	Mount Lemmon Survey	L4	8.8 km	MPC · JPL
595090	2001 FD_{248}	—	January 19, 2012	Haleakala	Pan-STARRS 1	·	2.3 km	MPC · JPL
595091	2001 FM_{248}	—	March 16, 2001	Kitt Peak	Spacewatch	VER	2.2 km	MPC · JPL
595092	2001 FS_{248}	—	March 19, 2001	Kitt Peak	Spacewatch	·	2.4 km	MPC · JPL
595093	2001 HE_{27}	—	April 23, 2001	Socorro	LINEAR	·	1.4 km	MPC · JPL
595094	2001 HC_{69}	—	October 2, 2006	Mount Lemmon	Mount Lemmon Survey	·	1.0 km	MPC · JPL
595095	2001 HA_{71}	—	February 17, 2018	Mount Lemmon	Mount Lemmon Survey	·	2.1 km	MPC · JPL
595096	2001 KA_{80}	—	August 12, 2013	Kitt Peak	Spacewatch	·	970 m	MPC · JPL
595097	2001 KF_{81}	—	August 30, 2016	Haleakala	Pan-STARRS 1	·	990 m	MPC · JPL
595098	2001 KF_{82}	—	October 17, 2010	Mount Lemmon	Mount Lemmon Survey	NYS	740 m	MPC · JPL
595099	2001 KW_{83}	—	August 30, 2016	Haleakala	Pan-STARRS 1	·	1.8 km	MPC · JPL
595100	2001 KT_{84}	—	June 28, 2015	Haleakala	Pan-STARRS 1	·	1.3 km	MPC · JPL

== 595101–595200 ==
back to top

Designation			Discovery			Properties		Ref
Permanent	Provisional	Named after	Date	Site	Discoverer(s)	Category	Diam.	Ref
595101	2001 KU_{84}	—	January 18, 2008	Kitt Peak	Spacewatch	·	750 m	MPC · JPL
595102	2001 KW_{84}	—	October 18, 2007	Mount Lemmon	Mount Lemmon Survey	EUN	1.1 km	MPC · JPL
595103	2001 KS_{85}	—	March 31, 2008	Mount Lemmon	Mount Lemmon Survey	·	840 m	MPC · JPL
595104	2001 KG_{87}	—	October 5, 2004	Kitt Peak	Spacewatch	VER	2.5 km	MPC · JPL
595105	2001 LC_{9}	—	June 15, 2001	Socorro	LINEAR	·	4.4 km	MPC · JPL
595106	2001 LB_{20}	—	April 4, 2014	Catalina	CSS	·	1.6 km	MPC · JPL
595107	2001 LJ_{20}	—	January 23, 2011	Mount Lemmon	Mount Lemmon Survey	·	2.4 km	MPC · JPL
595108	2001 OC_{28}	—	April 30, 1997	Kitt Peak	Spacewatch	V	750 m	MPC · JPL
595109	2001 OW_{113}	—	July 25, 2001	Haleakala	NEAT	·	2.1 km	MPC · JPL
595110	2001 OE_{114}	—	August 26, 2009	Catalina	CSS	·	1.6 km	MPC · JPL
595111	2001 PV_{15}	—	July 19, 2001	Palomar	NEAT	·	2.4 km	MPC · JPL
595112	2001 PO_{39}	—	August 11, 2001	Palomar	NEAT	·	1.9 km	MPC · JPL
595113	2001 PA_{68}	—	November 27, 2014	Mount Lemmon	Mount Lemmon Survey	·	1.4 km	MPC · JPL
595114	2001 QM_{71}	—	August 16, 2001	Palomar	NEAT	H	590 m	MPC · JPL
595115	2001 QA_{88}	—	August 21, 2001	Kitt Peak	Spacewatch	KOR	1.2 km	MPC · JPL
595116	2001 QE_{96}	—	August 21, 2001	Kitt Peak	Spacewatch	AMO	100 m	MPC · JPL
595117	2001 QH_{170}	—	August 23, 2001	Socorro	LINEAR	H	570 m	MPC · JPL
595118	2001 QQ_{201}	—	August 17, 2001	Socorro	LINEAR	·	920 m	MPC · JPL
595119	2001 QZ_{224}	—	August 15, 2001	Haleakala	NEAT	TIN	830 m	MPC · JPL
595120	2001 QS_{298}	—	August 19, 2001	Cerro Tololo	Deep Ecliptic Survey	·	1.4 km	MPC · JPL
595121	2001 QD_{303}	—	August 19, 2001	Cerro Tololo	Deep Ecliptic Survey	KOR	1.4 km	MPC · JPL
595122	2001 QZ_{335}	—	April 15, 2013	Haleakala	Pan-STARRS 1	·	870 m	MPC · JPL
595123	2001 QV_{338}	—	January 27, 2006	Mount Lemmon	Mount Lemmon Survey	·	410 m	MPC · JPL
595124	2001 RZ_{4}	—	August 24, 2001	Socorro	LINEAR	·	2.3 km	MPC · JPL
595125	2001 RR_{18}	—	July 30, 2001	Bergisch Gladbach	W. Bickel	·	980 m	MPC · JPL
595126	2001 RR_{111}	—	August 17, 2001	Palomar	NEAT	·	670 m	MPC · JPL
595127	2001 RP_{156}	—	August 29, 2006	Kitt Peak	Spacewatch	·	2.3 km	MPC · JPL
595128	2001 RP_{158}	—	September 11, 2001	Kitt Peak	Spacewatch	MAR	580 m	MPC · JPL
595129	2001 SY_{10}	—	August 16, 2001	Palomar	NEAT	·	3.2 km	MPC · JPL
595130	2001 SV_{71}	—	September 17, 2001	Socorro	LINEAR	·	1.9 km	MPC · JPL
595131	2001 SL_{88}	—	September 19, 2001	Kitt Peak	Spacewatch	·	2.0 km	MPC · JPL
595132	2001 SQ_{99}	—	September 19, 2001	Kitt Peak	Spacewatch	·	1.0 km	MPC · JPL
595133	2001 SO_{189}	—	September 19, 2001	Kitt Peak	Spacewatch	3:2	4.6 km	MPC · JPL
595134	2001 SQ_{190}	—	August 18, 2001	Palomar	NEAT	·	860 m	MPC · JPL
595135	2001 SF_{229}	—	September 18, 2001	Kitt Peak	Spacewatch	·	1.7 km	MPC · JPL
595136	2001 SC_{237}	—	September 17, 2001	Kitt Peak	Spacewatch	·	1.3 km	MPC · JPL
595137	2001 SJ_{294}	—	August 16, 2001	Socorro	LINEAR	·	1.1 km	MPC · JPL
595138	2001 SW_{307}	—	September 21, 2001	Socorro	LINEAR	·	630 m	MPC · JPL
595139	2001 SR_{337}	—	September 20, 2001	Kitt Peak	Spacewatch	V	660 m	MPC · JPL
595140	2001 SF_{344}	—	August 17, 2001	Palomar	NEAT	AEG	3.1 km	MPC · JPL
595141	2001 ST_{356}	—	October 20, 2012	Haleakala	Pan-STARRS 1	·	1.1 km	MPC · JPL
595142	2001 SG_{358}	—	November 14, 2007	Kitt Peak	Spacewatch	·	2.2 km	MPC · JPL
595143	2001 SK_{362}	—	September 18, 2001	Kitt Peak	Spacewatch	·	1.2 km	MPC · JPL
595144	2001 SC_{363}	—	January 18, 2008	Kitt Peak	Spacewatch	·	1.9 km	MPC · JPL
595145	2001 TG_{57}	—	September 21, 2001	Socorro	LINEAR	·	1.3 km	MPC · JPL
595146	2001 TL_{138}	—	October 10, 2001	Palomar	NEAT	EOS	2.5 km	MPC · JPL
595147	2001 TP_{147}	—	October 10, 2001	Palomar	NEAT	·	3.0 km	MPC · JPL
595148	2001 TA_{212}	—	September 25, 2001	Socorro	LINEAR	·	1.3 km	MPC · JPL
595149	2001 TK_{263}	—	October 13, 2001	Palomar	NEAT	·	1.5 km	MPC · JPL
595150	2001 TW_{263}	—	October 11, 2001	Palomar	NEAT	·	1.3 km	MPC · JPL
595151	2001 TH_{264}	—	December 28, 2013	Kitt Peak	Spacewatch	·	1.2 km	MPC · JPL
595152	2001 TF_{268}	—	January 15, 2018	Haleakala	Pan-STARRS 1	·	1.5 km	MPC · JPL
595153	2001 TE_{269}	—	October 14, 2001	Apache Point	SDSS Collaboration	·	670 m	MPC · JPL
595154	2001 UK	—	October 16, 2001	Socorro	LINEAR	·	920 m	MPC · JPL
595155	2001 UU_{25}	—	October 13, 2001	Anderson Mesa	LONEOS	·	2.0 km	MPC · JPL
595156	2001 UC_{38}	—	October 12, 2001	Anderson Mesa	LONEOS	·	1.3 km	MPC · JPL
595157	2001 UG_{80}	—	September 20, 2001	Socorro	LINEAR	·	620 m	MPC · JPL
595158	2001 UK_{91}	—	October 10, 2001	Palomar	NEAT	H	500 m	MPC · JPL
595159	2001 UD_{102}	—	October 20, 2001	Socorro	LINEAR	EOS	1.8 km	MPC · JPL
595160	2001 UT_{104}	—	October 20, 2001	Socorro	LINEAR	MAR	970 m	MPC · JPL
595161	2001 UA_{118}	—	October 22, 2001	Socorro	LINEAR	·	1.3 km	MPC · JPL
595162	2001 UA_{143}	—	October 18, 2001	Palomar	NEAT	·	2.6 km	MPC · JPL
595163	2001 UH_{147}	—	October 23, 2001	Socorro	LINEAR	TIR	2.3 km	MPC · JPL
595164	2001 UB_{194}	—	October 18, 2001	Palomar	NEAT	·	1.8 km	MPC · JPL
595165	2001 UV_{232}	—	September 28, 2009	Mount Lemmon	Mount Lemmon Survey	H	400 m	MPC · JPL
595166	2001 UF_{233}	—	March 14, 2011	Kitt Peak	Spacewatch	·	1.2 km	MPC · JPL
595167	2001 UM_{233}	—	November 1, 2005	Mount Lemmon	Mount Lemmon Survey	·	560 m	MPC · JPL
595168	2001 UX_{233}	—	November 4, 2007	Kitt Peak	Spacewatch	·	2.2 km	MPC · JPL
595169	2001 UF_{237}	—	April 30, 2016	Mount Lemmon	Mount Lemmon Survey	·	550 m	MPC · JPL
595170	2001 UZ_{237}	—	November 8, 2008	Kitt Peak	Spacewatch	·	580 m	MPC · JPL
595171	2001 VV_{80}	—	October 21, 2001	Socorro	LINEAR	·	2.4 km	MPC · JPL
595172	2001 VL_{134}	—	November 11, 2001	Apache Point	SDSS Collaboration	EOS	1.7 km	MPC · JPL
595173	2001 VP_{134}	—	January 1, 2008	Kitt Peak	Spacewatch	·	1.8 km	MPC · JPL
595174	2001 VQ_{134}	—	November 12, 2001	Apache Point	SDSS Collaboration	EOS	1.6 km	MPC · JPL
595175	2001 VG_{137}	—	September 25, 2017	Haleakala	Pan-STARRS 1	EOS	1.3 km	MPC · JPL
595176	2001 WS_{4}	—	November 19, 2001	Socorro	LINEAR	H	410 m	MPC · JPL
595177	2001 WV_{4}	—	November 16, 2001	Kitt Peak	Spacewatch	H	330 m	MPC · JPL
595178	2001 WD_{5}	—	November 20, 2001	Socorro	LINEAR	H	470 m	MPC · JPL
595179	2001 WH_{24}	—	November 17, 2001	Kitt Peak	Spacewatch	·	590 m	MPC · JPL
595180	2001 WK_{30}	—	November 17, 2001	Socorro	LINEAR	EOS	1.8 km	MPC · JPL
595181	2001 WF_{55}	—	November 19, 2001	Socorro	LINEAR	·	2.6 km	MPC · JPL
595182	2001 WZ_{67}	—	November 20, 2001	Socorro	LINEAR	·	1.9 km	MPC · JPL
595183	2001 WU_{79}	—	November 20, 2001	Socorro	LINEAR	·	2.7 km	MPC · JPL
595184	2001 WC_{92}	—	November 30, 2005	Mount Lemmon	Mount Lemmon Survey	MAS	870 m	MPC · JPL
595185	2001 WL_{96}	—	November 17, 2001	Kitt Peak	Spacewatch	·	2.2 km	MPC · JPL
595186	2001 XT_{60}	—	December 10, 2001	Socorro	LINEAR	·	650 m	MPC · JPL
595187	2001 XE_{142}	—	December 7, 2001	Kitt Peak	Spacewatch	MIS	2.0 km	MPC · JPL
595188	2001 XG_{166}	—	December 14, 2001	Socorro	LINEAR	·	1.1 km	MPC · JPL
595189	2001 XF_{260}	—	November 19, 2001	Anderson Mesa	LONEOS	H	470 m	MPC · JPL
595190	2001 XP_{268}	—	October 12, 2006	Palomar	NEAT	·	2.5 km	MPC · JPL
595191	2001 XS_{268}	—	December 14, 2001	Kitt Peak	Spacewatch	·	890 m	MPC · JPL
595192	2001 XK_{269}	—	January 11, 2002	Anderson Mesa	LONEOS	·	870 m	MPC · JPL
595193	2001 YC_{4}	—	December 22, 2001	Socorro	LINEAR	·	1.3 km	MPC · JPL
595194	2001 YE_{18}	—	December 13, 2001	Palomar	NEAT	EUP	3.6 km	MPC · JPL
595195	2001 YB_{30}	—	December 18, 2001	Socorro	LINEAR	·	3.3 km	MPC · JPL
595196	2001 YC_{94}	—	December 18, 2001	Kitt Peak	Spacewatch	·	2.2 km	MPC · JPL
595197	2001 YV_{162}	—	December 20, 2001	Apache Point	SDSS Collaboration	·	3.2 km	MPC · JPL
595198	2001 YN_{164}	—	October 12, 2007	Mount Lemmon	Mount Lemmon Survey	·	650 m	MPC · JPL
595199	2001 YX_{164}	—	November 30, 2005	Kitt Peak	Spacewatch	RAF	620 m	MPC · JPL
595200	2002 AD_{47}	—	January 9, 2002	Socorro	LINEAR	(5)	840 m	MPC · JPL

== 595201–595300 ==
back to top

Designation			Discovery			Properties		Ref
Permanent	Provisional	Named after	Date	Site	Discoverer(s)	Category	Diam.	Ref
595201	2002 AJ_{76}	—	January 8, 2002	Socorro	LINEAR	·	2.9 km	MPC · JPL
595202	2002 AX_{125}	—	January 11, 2002	Socorro	LINEAR	·	2.2 km	MPC · JPL
595203	2002 AT_{210}	—	January 14, 2002	Anderson Mesa	LONEOS	·	1.2 km	MPC · JPL
595204	2002 AD_{211}	—	December 22, 2008	Mount Lemmon	Mount Lemmon Survey	·	690 m	MPC · JPL
595205	2002 AK_{211}	—	November 15, 2006	Mount Lemmon	Mount Lemmon Survey	·	2.7 km	MPC · JPL
595206	2002 AO_{211}	—	August 9, 2015	Haleakala	Pan-STARRS 1	EOS	1.6 km	MPC · JPL
595207	2002 AR_{212}	—	August 27, 2014	Haleakala	Pan-STARRS 1	·	1.8 km	MPC · JPL
595208	2002 AJ_{213}	—	July 8, 2003	Palomar	NEAT	H	540 m	MPC · JPL
595209	2002 AZ_{213}	—	January 14, 2002	Kitt Peak	Spacewatch	·	1.8 km	MPC · JPL
595210	2002 AE_{214}	—	January 12, 2002	Kitt Peak	Spacewatch	·	1.6 km	MPC · JPL
595211	2002 AG_{215}	—	February 15, 1994	Kitt Peak	Spacewatch	EUN	950 m	MPC · JPL
595212	2002 AU_{215}	—	January 28, 2014	Mount Lemmon	Mount Lemmon Survey	PHO	860 m	MPC · JPL
595213	2002 BP_{33}	—	January 19, 2002	Kitt Peak	Spacewatch	·	1.0 km	MPC · JPL
595214	2002 BJ_{34}	—	February 20, 2015	Haleakala	Pan-STARRS 1	H	480 m	MPC · JPL
595215	2002 CN_{10}	—	February 6, 2002	Socorro	LINEAR	H	530 m	MPC · JPL
595216	2002 CW_{171}	—	February 8, 2002	Socorro	LINEAR	·	1.2 km	MPC · JPL
595217	2002 CZ_{176}	—	January 8, 2002	Palomar	NEAT	·	1.3 km	MPC · JPL
595218	2002 CD_{190}	—	January 20, 2002	Anderson Mesa	LONEOS	·	1.9 km	MPC · JPL
595219	2002 CN_{222}	—	February 7, 2002	Palomar	NEAT	·	1.2 km	MPC · JPL
595220	2002 CB_{228}	—	February 7, 2002	Palomar	NEAT	·	1.3 km	MPC · JPL
595221	2002 CM_{246}	—	February 13, 2002	Kitt Peak	Spacewatch	·	1.2 km	MPC · JPL
595222	2002 CK_{277}	—	February 7, 2002	Palomar	NEAT	·	1.2 km	MPC · JPL
595223	2002 CE_{317}	—	February 7, 2002	Palomar	NEAT	·	1.5 km	MPC · JPL
595224	2002 CJ_{318}	—	March 5, 2002	Catalina	CSS	BAR	1.5 km	MPC · JPL
595225	2002 CK_{319}	—	March 28, 2015	Haleakala	Pan-STARRS 1	·	930 m	MPC · JPL
595226	2002 CR_{319}	—	October 9, 2007	Mount Lemmon	Mount Lemmon Survey	·	710 m	MPC · JPL
595227	2002 CS_{319}	—	February 8, 2013	Haleakala	Pan-STARRS 1	·	2.4 km	MPC · JPL
595228	2002 CU_{319}	—	January 10, 2014	Mount Lemmon	Mount Lemmon Survey	·	1.0 km	MPC · JPL
595229	2002 CW_{319}	—	September 15, 2007	Mount Lemmon	Mount Lemmon Survey	·	690 m	MPC · JPL
595230	2002 CB_{321}	—	November 11, 2013	Kitt Peak	Spacewatch	HNS	910 m	MPC · JPL
595231	2002 CL_{321}	—	February 13, 2002	Kitt Peak	Spacewatch	·	1.9 km	MPC · JPL
595232	2002 CN_{321}	—	March 13, 2007	Kitt Peak	Spacewatch	PAD	1.3 km	MPC · JPL
595233	2002 CA_{322}	—	December 2, 2010	Mount Lemmon	Mount Lemmon Survey	L4	5.8 km	MPC · JPL
595234	2002 CO_{322}	—	February 17, 2015	Haleakala	Pan-STARRS 1	·	1.6 km	MPC · JPL
595235	2002 CH_{323}	—	August 29, 2005	Kitt Peak	Spacewatch	(260)	3.3 km	MPC · JPL
595236	2002 CZ_{323}	—	December 24, 2006	Kitt Peak	Spacewatch	·	2.2 km	MPC · JPL
595237	2002 CA_{326}	—	February 6, 2002	Kitt Peak	Deep Ecliptic Survey	THM	1.9 km	MPC · JPL
595238	2002 CB_{326}	—	September 3, 2008	Kitt Peak	Spacewatch	L4	7.0 km	MPC · JPL
595239	2002 CL_{326}	—	February 21, 2002	Kitt Peak	Spacewatch	·	1.8 km	MPC · JPL
595240	2002 CR_{326}	—	December 15, 2006	Kitt Peak	Spacewatch	THM	1.9 km	MPC · JPL
595241	2002 CU_{327}	—	January 17, 2013	Haleakala	Pan-STARRS 1	L4	6.5 km	MPC · JPL
595242	2002 DJ_{22}	—	February 20, 2002	Kitt Peak	Spacewatch	·	2.6 km	MPC · JPL
595243	2002 EJ_{23}	—	March 5, 2002	Kitt Peak	Spacewatch	·	2.3 km	MPC · JPL
595244	2002 EH_{25}	—	March 3, 2002	Kanab	Sheridan, E.	·	3.7 km	MPC · JPL
595245	2002 EA_{92}	—	March 13, 2002	Socorro	LINEAR	T_{j} (2.93)	2.4 km	MPC · JPL
595246	2002 EM_{104}	—	March 9, 2002	Anderson Mesa	LONEOS	·	1.6 km	MPC · JPL
595247	2002 ER_{109}	—	March 9, 2002	Kitt Peak	Spacewatch	·	1.4 km	MPC · JPL
595248	2002 EP_{126}	—	March 6, 2002	Palomar	NEAT	·	1.2 km	MPC · JPL
595249	2002 EM_{128}	—	March 12, 2002	Palomar	NEAT	·	2.7 km	MPC · JPL
595250	2002 EQ_{130}	—	March 12, 2002	Palomar	NEAT	TIR	2.6 km	MPC · JPL
595251	2002 EP_{137}	—	February 20, 2002	Kitt Peak	Spacewatch	·	1.2 km	MPC · JPL
595252	2002 EW_{143}	—	March 13, 2002	Kitt Peak	Spacewatch	·	1.3 km	MPC · JPL
595253	2002 ES_{152}	—	March 15, 2002	Mount Hamilton	M. W. Buie	·	1.9 km	MPC · JPL
595254	2002 ER_{157}	—	February 14, 2002	Kitt Peak	Spacewatch	L4	8.2 km	MPC · JPL
595255	2002 EW_{164}	—	October 10, 2007	Catalina	CSS	·	820 m	MPC · JPL
595256	2002 EA_{165}	—	September 29, 2008	Mount Lemmon	Mount Lemmon Survey	·	1.5 km	MPC · JPL
595257	2002 EV_{165}	—	November 3, 2010	Kitt Peak	Spacewatch	L4	7.7 km	MPC · JPL
595258	2002 EG_{166}	—	April 16, 2013	Kitt Peak	Spacewatch	·	2.2 km	MPC · JPL
595259	2002 EH_{166}	—	September 29, 2005	Mount Lemmon	Mount Lemmon Survey	THM	1.7 km	MPC · JPL
595260	2002 ES_{167}	—	March 10, 2002	Kitt Peak	Spacewatch	·	760 m	MPC · JPL
595261	2002 ED_{168}	—	April 4, 2016	Haleakala	Pan-STARRS 1	·	450 m	MPC · JPL
595262	2002 EX_{168}	—	February 5, 2009	Kitt Peak	Spacewatch	·	720 m	MPC · JPL
595263	2002 EE_{169}	—	September 9, 2008	Kitt Peak	Spacewatch	·	1.4 km	MPC · JPL
595264	2002 EQ_{169}	—	August 9, 2013	Kitt Peak	Spacewatch	·	2.0 km	MPC · JPL
595265	2002 ES_{169}	—	October 9, 2012	Mount Lemmon	Mount Lemmon Survey	·	1.2 km	MPC · JPL
595266	2002 EX_{169}	—	February 17, 2007	Mount Lemmon	Mount Lemmon Survey	·	1.8 km	MPC · JPL
595267	2002 EN_{170}	—	June 22, 2015	Haleakala	Pan-STARRS 2	·	750 m	MPC · JPL
595268	2002 ES_{170}	—	January 19, 2013	Kitt Peak	Spacewatch	L4	6.5 km	MPC · JPL
595269	2002 ED_{171}	—	November 8, 2010	Mount Lemmon	Mount Lemmon Survey	L4	6.8 km	MPC · JPL
595270	2002 EO_{171}	—	July 18, 2007	Mount Lemmon	Mount Lemmon Survey	L4	7.9 km	MPC · JPL
595271	2002 EQ_{171}	—	February 6, 2013	Mount Lemmon	Mount Lemmon Survey	L4	7.2 km	MPC · JPL
595272	2002 EV_{172}	—	March 9, 2002	Kitt Peak	Spacewatch	EOS	1.4 km	MPC · JPL
595273	2002 FE_{1}	—	March 18, 2002	Bohyunsan	Bohyunsan	HNS	1.1 km	MPC · JPL
595274	2002 FL_{19}	—	March 18, 2002	Kitt Peak	Deep Ecliptic Survey	T_{j} (2.99) · 3:2	3.9 km	MPC · JPL
595275	2002 FU_{23}	—	March 18, 2002	Kitt Peak	Spacewatch	·	2.1 km	MPC · JPL
595276	2002 FK_{42}	—	October 30, 2014	Mount Lemmon	Mount Lemmon Survey	·	600 m	MPC · JPL
595277	2002 FT_{42}	—	February 17, 2010	Kitt Peak	Spacewatch	·	750 m	MPC · JPL
595278	2002 FN_{43}	—	October 30, 2014	Kitt Peak	Spacewatch	·	660 m	MPC · JPL
595279	2002 FR_{43}	—	September 19, 2008	Kitt Peak	Spacewatch	L4	6.8 km	MPC · JPL
595280	2002 GT_{2}	—	April 4, 2002	Haleakala	NEAT	THB	3.1 km	MPC · JPL
595281	2002 GB_{4}	—	April 9, 2002	Palomar	NEAT	·	1.3 km	MPC · JPL
595282	2002 GT_{26}	—	April 11, 2002	Palomar	NEAT	H	520 m	MPC · JPL
595283	2002 GV_{27}	—	April 6, 2002	Cerro Tololo	Deep Ecliptic Survey	·	1.9 km	MPC · JPL
595284	2002 GQ_{28}	—	February 8, 2002	Kitt Peak	Deep Ecliptic Survey	·	2.3 km	MPC · JPL
595285	2002 GK_{31}	—	April 7, 2002	Cerro Tololo	Deep Ecliptic Survey	·	2.1 km	MPC · JPL
595286	2002 GQ_{31}	—	March 12, 2002	Kitt Peak	Spacewatch	·	900 m	MPC · JPL
595287	2002 GP_{47}	—	April 4, 2002	Kitt Peak	Spacewatch	·	2.2 km	MPC · JPL
595288	2002 GP_{91}	—	April 4, 2002	Haleakala	NEAT	·	1.7 km	MPC · JPL
595289	2002 GL_{113}	—	April 11, 2002	Palomar	NEAT	·	1.2 km	MPC · JPL
595290	2002 GD_{120}	—	April 12, 2002	Palomar	NEAT	·	840 m	MPC · JPL
595291	2002 GY_{136}	—	April 12, 2002	Kitt Peak	Spacewatch	·	890 m	MPC · JPL
595292	2002 GY_{165}	—	April 15, 2002	Palomar	NEAT	PHO	710 m	MPC · JPL
595293	2002 GA_{172}	—	April 10, 2002	Socorro	LINEAR	·	1.2 km	MPC · JPL
595294	2002 GU_{179}	—	April 4, 2002	Palomar	NEAT	·	710 m	MPC · JPL
595295	2002 GC_{186}	—	April 9, 2002	Palomar	NEAT	ADE	1.5 km	MPC · JPL
595296	2002 GB_{188}	—	February 4, 2009	Mount Lemmon	Mount Lemmon Survey	·	740 m	MPC · JPL
595297	2002 GB_{190}	—	March 2, 2009	Mount Lemmon	Mount Lemmon Survey	·	850 m	MPC · JPL
595298	2002 GE_{190}	—	April 8, 2002	Palomar	NEAT	·	2.5 km	MPC · JPL
595299	2002 GF_{190}	—	April 22, 2002	Kitt Peak	Spacewatch	·	2.7 km	MPC · JPL
595300	2002 GD_{191}	—	September 3, 2007	Mount Lemmon	Mount Lemmon Survey	·	1.8 km	MPC · JPL

== 595301–595400 ==
back to top

Designation			Discovery			Properties		Ref
Permanent	Provisional	Named after	Date	Site	Discoverer(s)	Category	Diam.	Ref
595301	2002 GE_{191}	—	October 1, 2003	Kitt Peak	Spacewatch	·	1.5 km	MPC · JPL
595302	2002 GG_{191}	—	April 10, 2002	Palomar	NEAT	PHO	860 m	MPC · JPL
595303	2002 GR_{191}	—	November 3, 2008	Mount Lemmon	Mount Lemmon Survey	MAR	1.1 km	MPC · JPL
595304	2002 GT_{191}	—	April 15, 2002	Palomar	NEAT	·	1.0 km	MPC · JPL
595305	2002 GL_{192}	—	October 20, 2012	Haleakala	Pan-STARRS 1	·	1.8 km	MPC · JPL
595306	2002 GP_{192}	—	October 27, 2005	Kitt Peak	Spacewatch	·	2.2 km	MPC · JPL
595307	2002 GG_{193}	—	April 4, 2002	Kitt Peak	Spacewatch	·	630 m	MPC · JPL
595308	2002 GL_{193}	—	April 9, 2002	Kitt Peak	Spacewatch	·	830 m	MPC · JPL
595309	2002 GT_{193}	—	December 2, 2008	Mount Lemmon	Mount Lemmon Survey	EUN	1.4 km	MPC · JPL
595310	2002 GU_{195}	—	April 8, 2002	Kitt Peak	Spacewatch	·	1.5 km	MPC · JPL
595311	2002 GA_{196}	—	July 27, 2011	Siding Spring	SSS	BRG	1.6 km	MPC · JPL
595312	2002 HR_{12}	—	April 10, 2002	Socorro	LINEAR	(1547)	1.3 km	MPC · JPL
595313	2002 HJ_{18}	—	April 21, 2002	Palomar	NEAT	·	1.7 km	MPC · JPL
595314	2002 HX_{18}	—	March 13, 2014	Mount Lemmon	Mount Lemmon Survey	MAR	1.1 km	MPC · JPL
595315	2002 HF_{19}	—	June 15, 2015	Haleakala	Pan-STARRS 1	·	1.3 km	MPC · JPL
595316	2002 JO_{8}	—	April 10, 2002	Socorro	LINEAR	PHO	820 m	MPC · JPL
595317	2002 JY_{13}	—	April 12, 2002	Palomar	NEAT	H	560 m	MPC · JPL
595318	2002 JM_{21}	—	May 4, 2002	Palomar	NEAT	MAR	990 m	MPC · JPL
595319	2002 JF_{53}	—	April 14, 2002	Socorro	LINEAR	·	1.5 km	MPC · JPL
595320	2002 JE_{145}	—	May 13, 2002	Palomar	NEAT	EUN	1.4 km	MPC · JPL
595321	2002 JE_{150}	—	May 10, 2002	Palomar	NEAT	·	3.0 km	MPC · JPL
595322	2002 JY_{150}	—	April 24, 2009	Mount Lemmon	Mount Lemmon Survey	·	620 m	MPC · JPL
595323	2002 JB_{151}	—	October 16, 2009	Catalina	CSS	·	3.7 km	MPC · JPL
595324	2002 JG_{151}	—	January 16, 2005	Mauna Kea	Veillet, C.	NYS	1.1 km	MPC · JPL
595325	2002 JO_{151}	—	May 18, 2002	Palomar	NEAT	EUN	1.4 km	MPC · JPL
595326	2002 JV_{151}	—	December 3, 2004	Kitt Peak	Spacewatch	·	1.8 km	MPC · JPL
595327	2002 JX_{152}	—	November 24, 2011	Haleakala	Pan-STARRS 1	·	2.5 km	MPC · JPL
595328	2002 JY_{152}	—	May 14, 2002	Kitt Peak	Spacewatch	·	2.7 km	MPC · JPL
595329	2002 JB_{153}	—	May 12, 2002	Palomar	NEAT	·	1.2 km	MPC · JPL
595330	2002 JH_{153}	—	November 17, 2014	Haleakala	Pan-STARRS 1	·	620 m	MPC · JPL
595331	2002 JN_{153}	—	December 23, 2017	Haleakala	Pan-STARRS 1	·	1.1 km	MPC · JPL
595332	2002 KD_{16}	—	May 17, 2002	Palomar	NEAT	·	2.4 km	MPC · JPL
595333	2002 KZ_{16}	—	September 26, 2009	Catalina	CSS	·	4.7 km	MPC · JPL
595334	2002 LS_{64}	—	August 19, 2006	Anderson Mesa	LONEOS	·	1.2 km	MPC · JPL
595335	2002 LY_{64}	—	February 22, 2009	Kitt Peak	Spacewatch	·	970 m	MPC · JPL
595336	2002 LH_{65}	—	January 19, 2012	Haleakala	Pan-STARRS 1	·	970 m	MPC · JPL
595337	2002 LY_{65}	—	July 25, 2014	Haleakala	Pan-STARRS 1	·	2.1 km	MPC · JPL
595338	2002 MW_{5}	—	July 20, 2002	Palomar	NEAT	·	1.8 km	MPC · JPL
595339	2002 MS_{6}	—	May 14, 2008	Mount Lemmon	Mount Lemmon Survey	·	970 m	MPC · JPL
595340	2002 MU_{6}	—	August 6, 2002	Palomar	NEAT	·	1.3 km	MPC · JPL
595341	2002 MG_{7}	—	April 20, 2009	Kitt Peak	Spacewatch	·	1.1 km	MPC · JPL
595342	2002 ML_{7}	—	November 1, 2010	Kitt Peak	Spacewatch	·	1.1 km	MPC · JPL
595343	2002 MH_{8}	—	April 6, 2013	Catalina	CSS	·	3.2 km	MPC · JPL
595344	2002 NK_{31}	—	July 8, 2002	Palomar	NEAT	·	1.4 km	MPC · JPL
595345	2002 NH_{69}	—	July 12, 2002	Palomar	NEAT	·	1.3 km	MPC · JPL
595346	2002 NU_{75}	—	September 10, 2007	Mount Lemmon	Mount Lemmon Survey	·	1.5 km	MPC · JPL
595347	2002 NS_{78}	—	August 23, 2007	Kitt Peak	Spacewatch	·	1.9 km	MPC · JPL
595348	2002 NM_{80}	—	November 5, 2007	Kitt Peak	Spacewatch	·	1.3 km	MPC · JPL
595349	2002 NV_{81}	—	August 4, 2002	Palomar Mountain	NEAT	·	1.7 km	MPC · JPL
595350	2002 NR_{82}	—	August 6, 2002	Palomar	NEAT	H	530 m	MPC · JPL
595351	2002 OY_{30}	—	July 21, 2002	Palomar	NEAT	JUN	710 m	MPC · JPL
595352	2002 OT_{34}	—	July 16, 2002	Palomar	NEAT	·	2.1 km	MPC · JPL
595353	2002 OT_{37}	—	May 23, 2006	Catalina	CSS	JUN	920 m	MPC · JPL
595354	2002 OY_{37}	—	January 19, 2012	Haleakala	Pan-STARRS 1	·	3.3 km	MPC · JPL
595355	2002 PT_{5}	—	July 20, 2002	Palomar	NEAT	·	1.8 km	MPC · JPL
595356	2002 PZ_{17}	—	August 6, 2002	Palomar	NEAT	·	1 km	MPC · JPL
595357	2002 PT_{87}	—	August 12, 2002	Anderson Mesa	LONEOS	H	600 m	MPC · JPL
595358	2002 PD_{92}	—	July 9, 2002	Palomar	NEAT	·	1.3 km	MPC · JPL
595359	2002 PO_{103}	—	July 12, 2002	Palomar	NEAT	·	3.5 km	MPC · JPL
595360	2002 PT_{109}	—	August 4, 2002	Palomar	NEAT	HNS	1.5 km	MPC · JPL
595361	2002 PJ_{130}	—	August 14, 2002	Socorro	LINEAR	PHO	1.1 km	MPC · JPL
595362 Schievink	2002 PC_{168}	Schievink	August 11, 2002	Palomar	NEAT	V	520 m	MPC · JPL
595363	2002 PF_{168}	—	August 8, 2002	Palomar	NEAT	DOR	1.9 km	MPC · JPL
595364	2002 PK_{168}	—	January 24, 2012	Haleakala	Pan-STARRS 1	PHO	1.0 km	MPC · JPL
595365	2002 PG_{181}	—	August 15, 2002	Palomar	NEAT	·	760 m	MPC · JPL
595366	2002 PR_{181}	—	August 4, 2002	Palomar	NEAT	·	1.8 km	MPC · JPL
595367	2002 PQ_{183}	—	August 15, 2002	Palomar	NEAT	·	1.0 km	MPC · JPL
595368	2002 PY_{185}	—	May 11, 2007	Kitt Peak	Spacewatch	·	3.0 km	MPC · JPL
595369	2002 PO_{192}	—	September 12, 2007	Mount Lemmon	Mount Lemmon Survey	·	1.4 km	MPC · JPL
595370	2002 PO_{195}	—	September 10, 2007	Kitt Peak	Spacewatch	·	1.7 km	MPC · JPL
595371	2002 PX_{198}	—	October 12, 2007	Mount Lemmon	Mount Lemmon Survey	·	1.7 km	MPC · JPL
595372	2002 PU_{201}	—	September 13, 2007	Catalina	CSS	·	2.6 km	MPC · JPL
595373	2002 PY_{203}	—	December 1, 2003	Kitt Peak	Spacewatch	·	1.3 km	MPC · JPL
595374	2002 PB_{204}	—	August 1, 2016	Haleakala	Pan-STARRS 1	·	790 m	MPC · JPL
595375	2002 QA_{28}	—	August 28, 2002	Palomar	NEAT	·	3.2 km	MPC · JPL
595376	2002 QF_{55}	—	August 17, 2002	Palomar	NEAT	·	830 m	MPC · JPL
595377	2002 QH_{76}	—	August 18, 2002	Palomar	NEAT	·	660 m	MPC · JPL
595378	2002 QY_{80}	—	April 10, 2005	Kitt Peak	Spacewatch	·	1.1 km	MPC · JPL
595379	2002 QZ_{84}	—	August 28, 2002	Palomar	NEAT	·	1.5 km	MPC · JPL
595380	2002 QV_{93}	—	August 29, 2002	Palomar	NEAT	EUN	1.1 km	MPC · JPL
595381	2002 QW_{110}	—	September 17, 2006	Kitt Peak	Spacewatch	·	770 m	MPC · JPL
595382	2002 QH_{114}	—	August 28, 2002	Palomar	NEAT	·	1.2 km	MPC · JPL
595383	2002 QP_{117}	—	August 16, 2002	Palomar	NEAT	·	1.0 km	MPC · JPL
595384	2002 QP_{118}	—	August 30, 2002	Palomar	NEAT	HYG	2.5 km	MPC · JPL
595385	2002 QZ_{132}	—	August 18, 2002	Palomar	NEAT	ADE	1.3 km	MPC · JPL
595386	2002 QT_{133}	—	August 28, 2002	Palomar	NEAT	·	2.0 km	MPC · JPL
595387	2002 QT_{138}	—	August 29, 2002	Kitt Peak	Spacewatch	EUN	900 m	MPC · JPL
595388	2002 QM_{140}	—	August 20, 2002	Palomar	NEAT	PHO	810 m	MPC · JPL
595389	2002 QC_{143}	—	March 18, 2009	Siding Spring	SSS	H	570 m	MPC · JPL
595390	2002 QO_{143}	—	May 25, 2009	Kitt Peak	Spacewatch	NYS	890 m	MPC · JPL
595391	2002 QA_{146}	—	August 28, 2002	Palomar	NEAT	H	470 m	MPC · JPL
595392	2002 QA_{147}	—	September 9, 2008	Mount Lemmon	Mount Lemmon Survey	·	2.9 km	MPC · JPL
595393	2002 QD_{147}	—	April 30, 2011	Mount Lemmon	Mount Lemmon Survey	·	720 m	MPC · JPL
595394	2002 QV_{148}	—	October 22, 1998	Kitt Peak	Spacewatch	WIT	930 m	MPC · JPL
595395	2002 QZ_{148}	—	August 20, 2011	Haleakala	Pan-STARRS 1	·	1.4 km	MPC · JPL
595396	2002 QX_{149}	—	August 27, 2002	Palomar	NEAT	·	1.8 km	MPC · JPL
595397	2002 QB_{150}	—	October 8, 2007	Mount Lemmon	Mount Lemmon Survey	·	1.6 km	MPC · JPL
595398	2002 QJ_{150}	—	March 12, 2005	Kitt Peak	Spacewatch	NYS	1.0 km	MPC · JPL
595399	2002 QN_{151}	—	February 3, 2009	Kitt Peak	Spacewatch	·	2.0 km	MPC · JPL
595400	2002 QR_{151}	—	August 17, 2009	La Sagra	OAM	V	600 m	MPC · JPL

== 595401–595500 ==
back to top

Designation			Discovery			Properties		Ref
Permanent	Provisional	Named after	Date	Site	Discoverer(s)	Category	Diam.	Ref
595401	2002 QL_{153}	—	August 30, 2002	Palomar	NEAT	·	890 m	MPC · JPL
595402	2002 QJ_{154}	—	October 25, 2008	Catalina	CSS	LIX	3.3 km	MPC · JPL
595403	2002 QP_{154}	—	October 14, 2007	Catalina	CSS	·	2.2 km	MPC · JPL
595404	2002 QR_{154}	—	January 19, 2012	Haleakala	Pan-STARRS 1	·	1.2 km	MPC · JPL
595405	2002 QN_{155}	—	April 22, 2012	Kitt Peak	Spacewatch	·	2.3 km	MPC · JPL
595406	2002 QR_{155}	—	October 19, 2006	Kitt Peak	Spacewatch	·	1.0 km	MPC · JPL
595407	2002 QU_{155}	—	November 1, 2013	Mount Lemmon	Mount Lemmon Survey	·	740 m	MPC · JPL
595408	2002 QM_{158}	—	October 10, 2007	Kitt Peak	Spacewatch	·	1.8 km	MPC · JPL
595409	2002 QM_{159}	—	January 1, 2009	Mount Lemmon	Mount Lemmon Survey	·	1.7 km	MPC · JPL
595410	2002 RD_{117}	—	September 7, 2002	Ondřejov	P. Pravec, P. Kušnirák	·	1.6 km	MPC · JPL
595411	2002 RP_{122}	—	September 8, 2002	Haleakala	NEAT	·	1.3 km	MPC · JPL
595412	2002 RN_{124}	—	September 9, 2002	Palomar	NEAT	H	500 m	MPC · JPL
595413	2002 RS_{152}	—	September 12, 2002	Palomar	NEAT	DOR	1.8 km	MPC · JPL
595414	2002 RE_{187}	—	September 13, 2002	Palomar	NEAT	PHO	860 m	MPC · JPL
595415	2002 RC_{198}	—	September 13, 2002	Palomar	NEAT	3:2 · SHU	5.0 km	MPC · JPL
595416	2002 RE_{200}	—	August 17, 2002	Haleakala	NEAT	·	1.7 km	MPC · JPL
595417	2002 RF_{207}	—	November 17, 1995	Kitt Peak	Spacewatch	·	770 m	MPC · JPL
595418	2002 RF_{211}	—	September 9, 2002	Haleakala	NEAT	JUN	1.0 km	MPC · JPL
595419	2002 RM_{223}	—	September 13, 2002	Haleakala	NEAT	·	700 m	MPC · JPL
595420	2002 RF_{226}	—	September 13, 2002	Haleakala	NEAT	·	1.3 km	MPC · JPL
595421	2002 RM_{237}	—	September 5, 2002	Socorro	LINEAR	·	2.0 km	MPC · JPL
595422	2002 RX_{241}	—	September 6, 2002	Socorro	LINEAR	·	1.4 km	MPC · JPL
595423	2002 RB_{243}	—	August 12, 2002	Socorro	LINEAR	·	1.1 km	MPC · JPL
595424	2002 RK_{246}	—	September 15, 2002	Palomar	NEAT	·	750 m	MPC · JPL
595425	2002 RA_{264}	—	September 11, 2002	Palomar	NEAT	·	1.9 km	MPC · JPL
595426	2002 RS_{273}	—	September 4, 2002	Palomar	NEAT	·	1.7 km	MPC · JPL
595427	2002 RU_{282}	—	August 12, 2002	Cerro Tololo	Deep Ecliptic Survey	HOF	2.5 km	MPC · JPL
595428	2002 RY_{282}	—	November 2, 2007	Kitt Peak	Spacewatch	HOF	2.4 km	MPC · JPL
595429	2002 RP_{285}	—	August 12, 2002	Cerro Tololo	Deep Ecliptic Survey	·	820 m	MPC · JPL
595430	2002 RE_{288}	—	March 15, 2010	Kitt Peak	Spacewatch	·	1.8 km	MPC · JPL
595431	2002 RG_{290}	—	September 4, 2002	Palomar	NEAT	H	520 m	MPC · JPL
595432	2002 RQ_{290}	—	November 1, 2008	Mount Lemmon	Mount Lemmon Survey	·	2.0 km	MPC · JPL
595433	2002 RV_{293}	—	July 5, 2011	Haleakala	Pan-STARRS 1	·	1.6 km	MPC · JPL
595434	2002 RF_{296}	—	October 18, 2011	Catalina	CSS	EUN	1.3 km	MPC · JPL
595435	2002 RN_{296}	—	September 15, 2002	Haleakala	NEAT	JUN	750 m	MPC · JPL
595436	2002 RB_{299}	—	March 11, 2008	Mount Lemmon	Mount Lemmon Survey	·	780 m	MPC · JPL
595437	2002 RM_{299}	—	February 9, 2005	Kitt Peak	Spacewatch	·	1.6 km	MPC · JPL
595438	2002 RX_{299}	—	September 20, 2011	Kitt Peak	Spacewatch	·	1.4 km	MPC · JPL
595439	2002 SB_{33}	—	September 28, 2002	Haleakala	NEAT	NYS	1.3 km	MPC · JPL
595440	2002 SG_{36}	—	September 29, 2002	Haleakala	NEAT	·	880 m	MPC · JPL
595441	2002 SD_{59}	—	September 5, 2002	Haleakala	NEAT	H	490 m	MPC · JPL
595442	2002 ST_{60}	—	September 16, 2002	Palomar	NEAT	·	2.4 km	MPC · JPL
595443	2002 SB_{74}	—	September 19, 2002	Palomar	NEAT	·	1.4 km	MPC · JPL
595444	2002 SL_{74}	—	October 11, 2007	Kitt Peak	Spacewatch	HOF	2.5 km	MPC · JPL
595445	2002 TO_{18}	—	October 2, 2002	Socorro	LINEAR	·	490 m	MPC · JPL
595446	2002 TS_{59}	—	October 4, 2002	Socorro	LINEAR	H	550 m	MPC · JPL
595447	2002 TR_{88}	—	October 3, 2002	Palomar	NEAT	·	1.6 km	MPC · JPL
595448	2002 TB_{101}	—	October 4, 2002	Socorro	LINEAR	·	660 m	MPC · JPL
595449	2002 TT_{119}	—	October 3, 2002	Palomar	NEAT	JUN	960 m	MPC · JPL
595450	2002 TH_{153}	—	October 5, 2002	Palomar	NEAT	·	1.7 km	MPC · JPL
595451	2002 TJ_{158}	—	October 5, 2002	Palomar	NEAT	·	1.4 km	MPC · JPL
595452	2002 TW_{162}	—	October 5, 2002	Palomar	NEAT	·	2.6 km	MPC · JPL
595453	2002 TV_{182}	—	October 4, 2002	Socorro	LINEAR	·	1.3 km	MPC · JPL
595454	2002 TF_{241}	—	October 2, 2002	Socorro	LINEAR	·	1.3 km	MPC · JPL
595455	2002 TP_{277}	—	October 3, 2002	Palomar	NEAT	·	2.0 km	MPC · JPL
595456	2002 TQ_{380}	—	April 2, 2005	Mount Lemmon	Mount Lemmon Survey	·	1.8 km	MPC · JPL
595457	2002 TZ_{386}	—	March 15, 2004	Kitt Peak	Spacewatch	PHO	990 m	MPC · JPL
595458	2002 TJ_{387}	—	October 5, 2002	Palomar	NEAT	·	1.5 km	MPC · JPL
595459	2002 TF_{389}	—	November 28, 2014	Mount Lemmon	Mount Lemmon Survey	PHO	1.4 km	MPC · JPL
595460	2002 TP_{389}	—	September 18, 2007	Kitt Peak	Spacewatch	·	1.7 km	MPC · JPL
595461	2002 TA_{390}	—	September 26, 2006	Mount Lemmon	Mount Lemmon Survey	·	700 m	MPC · JPL
595462	2002 TB_{390}	—	September 24, 2011	Mount Lemmon	Mount Lemmon Survey	·	1.5 km	MPC · JPL
595463	2002 TM_{394}	—	October 4, 2002	Campo Imperatore	CINEOS	·	1.8 km	MPC · JPL
595464	2002 UB_{4}	—	October 28, 2002	Nogales	P. R. Holvorcem, M. Schwartz	·	1.2 km	MPC · JPL
595465	2002 UB_{28}	—	October 15, 2002	Palomar	NEAT	·	1.6 km	MPC · JPL
595466	2002 UM_{35}	—	October 31, 2002	Palomar	NEAT	·	1.5 km	MPC · JPL
595467	2002 UX_{39}	—	October 31, 2002	Socorro	LINEAR	·	430 m	MPC · JPL
595468	2002 UZ_{75}	—	October 31, 2002	Apache Point	SDSS Collaboration	VER	2.2 km	MPC · JPL
595469	2002 UL_{79}	—	August 12, 2007	Siding Spring	SSS	H	700 m	MPC · JPL
595470	2002 UX_{81}	—	September 15, 2013	Haleakala	Pan-STARRS 1	V	550 m	MPC · JPL
595471	2002 VV_{28}	—	November 5, 2002	Anderson Mesa	LONEOS	·	1.3 km	MPC · JPL
595472	2002 VZ_{103}	—	November 12, 2002	Socorro	LINEAR	·	1.3 km	MPC · JPL
595473	2002 VT_{138}	—	April 14, 2005	Kitt Peak	Spacewatch	·	2.5 km	MPC · JPL
595474	2002 VX_{149}	—	May 10, 2005	Mount Lemmon	Mount Lemmon Survey	·	2.5 km	MPC · JPL
595475	2002 VS_{150}	—	July 29, 2005	Palomar	NEAT	·	900 m	MPC · JPL
595476	2002 VU_{150}	—	August 11, 2012	Siding Spring	SSS	·	570 m	MPC · JPL
595477	2002 VC_{151}	—	September 18, 2011	Mount Lemmon	Mount Lemmon Survey	KOR	950 m	MPC · JPL
595478	2002 VP_{154}	—	November 7, 2002	Kitt Peak	Deep Ecliptic Survey	·	1.4 km	MPC · JPL
595479	2002 WA_{21}	—	November 24, 2002	Palomar	NEAT	KOR	1.4 km	MPC · JPL
595480 Luidens	2002 WP_{29}	Luidens	November 22, 2002	Palomar	NEAT	·	1.1 km	MPC · JPL
595481	2002 WR_{32}	—	October 14, 2009	Catalina	CSS	·	710 m	MPC · JPL
595482	2002 XZ_{53}	—	November 13, 2002	Palomar	NEAT	·	1.2 km	MPC · JPL
595483	2002 XK_{120}	—	December 3, 2002	Palomar	NEAT	V	620 m	MPC · JPL
595484	2002 XR_{120}	—	December 3, 2002	Palomar	NEAT	·	910 m	MPC · JPL
595485	2002 XZ_{121}	—	December 23, 2012	Haleakala	Pan-STARRS 1	KOR	1.2 km	MPC · JPL
595486	2002 XP_{123}	—	December 9, 2002	Uccle	T. Pauwels	EUP	3.5 km	MPC · JPL
595487	2002 XY_{123}	—	September 20, 2011	Mount Lemmon	Mount Lemmon Survey	·	1.5 km	MPC · JPL
595488	2002 XO_{124}	—	December 5, 2007	Mount Lemmon	Mount Lemmon Survey	·	1.8 km	MPC · JPL
595489	2002 YV_{10}	—	December 31, 2002	Socorro	LINEAR	·	1.1 km	MPC · JPL
595490	2003 AQ_{9}	—	January 3, 2003	Kitt Peak	Spacewatch	MAS	670 m	MPC · JPL
595491	2003 AB_{93}	—	January 1, 2003	La Silla	F. Hormuth	L5	5.9 km	MPC · JPL
595492	2003 BN_{3}	—	January 24, 2003	La Silla	A. Boattini, Hainaut, O.	·	1.7 km	MPC · JPL
595493	2003 BR_{4}	—	January 24, 2003	La Silla	A. Boattini, Hainaut, O.	·	2.6 km	MPC · JPL
595494	2003 BM_{12}	—	January 26, 2003	Anderson Mesa	LONEOS	T_{j} (2.99)	3.4 km	MPC · JPL
595495	2003 BV_{40}	—	January 28, 2003	Socorro	LINEAR	·	3.6 km	MPC · JPL
595496	2003 BV_{56}	—	January 27, 2003	Socorro	LINEAR	·	2.0 km	MPC · JPL
595497	2003 BK_{64}	—	January 15, 2003	Palomar	NEAT	·	2.0 km	MPC · JPL
595498	2003 BG_{94}	—	January 24, 2003	Palomar	NEAT	·	2.0 km	MPC · JPL
595499	2003 BR_{96}	—	March 2, 2009	Mount Lemmon	Mount Lemmon Survey	·	1.8 km	MPC · JPL
595500	2003 BZ_{96}	—	March 5, 2011	Mount Lemmon	Mount Lemmon Survey	·	1.1 km	MPC · JPL

== 595501–595600 ==
back to top

Designation			Discovery			Properties		Ref
Permanent	Provisional	Named after	Date	Site	Discoverer(s)	Category	Diam.	Ref
595501	2003 BB_{97}	—	March 2, 2009	Kitt Peak	Spacewatch	EOS	1.6 km	MPC · JPL
595502	2003 BF_{97}	—	July 8, 2016	Haleakala	Pan-STARRS 1	EOS	1.6 km	MPC · JPL
595503	2003 BD_{99}	—	December 10, 2006	Kitt Peak	Spacewatch	·	1.0 km	MPC · JPL
595504	2003 BC_{101}	—	February 1, 2008	Kitt Peak	Spacewatch	·	1.2 km	MPC · JPL
595505	2003 BV_{101}	—	April 25, 2015	Haleakala	Pan-STARRS 1	·	1.9 km	MPC · JPL
595506	2003 BE_{102}	—	December 9, 2010	Mount Lemmon	Mount Lemmon Survey	EUN	1.1 km	MPC · JPL
595507	2003 CL_{19}	—	January 27, 2003	Kitt Peak	Spacewatch	H	570 m	MPC · JPL
595508	2003 CD_{23}	—	February 7, 2003	La Silla	Barbieri, C.	EMA	2.9 km	MPC · JPL
595509	2003 CX_{26}	—	April 4, 2014	Kitt Peak	Spacewatch	·	1.7 km	MPC · JPL
595510	2003 CY_{26}	—	May 21, 2015	Haleakala	Pan-STARRS 1	·	1.8 km	MPC · JPL
595511	2003 EY_{63}	—	March 10, 2003	Palomar	NEAT	·	2.9 km	MPC · JPL
595512	2003 EB_{64}	—	March 6, 2003	Anderson Mesa	LONEOS	·	2.0 km	MPC · JPL
595513	2003 FS_{38}	—	March 23, 2003	Kitt Peak	Spacewatch	·	980 m	MPC · JPL
595514	2003 FT_{81}	—	March 11, 2003	Kitt Peak	Spacewatch	·	710 m	MPC · JPL
595515	2003 FE_{133}	—	March 26, 2003	Kitt Peak	Spacewatch	·	2.9 km	MPC · JPL
595516	2003 FJ_{134}	—	March 26, 2003	Palomar	NEAT	EOS	1.7 km	MPC · JPL
595517	2003 FR_{135}	—	April 22, 2007	Mount Lemmon	Mount Lemmon Survey	·	1.0 km	MPC · JPL
595518	2003 FK_{136}	—	February 7, 2008	Kitt Peak	Spacewatch	·	1.4 km	MPC · JPL
595519	2003 FD_{137}	—	October 26, 1995	Kitt Peak	Spacewatch	·	2.5 km	MPC · JPL
595520	2003 FY_{137}	—	March 26, 2003	Kitt Peak	Spacewatch	·	1.1 km	MPC · JPL
595521	2003 FU_{139}	—	April 30, 2014	Haleakala	Pan-STARRS 1	·	1.7 km	MPC · JPL
595522	2003 FY_{139}	—	March 22, 2015	Haleakala	Pan-STARRS 1	L4	6.0 km	MPC · JPL
595523	2003 FG_{140}	—	May 18, 2015	Haleakala	Pan-STARRS 2	·	2.1 km	MPC · JPL
595524	2003 FS_{141}	—	March 26, 2003	Kitt Peak	Spacewatch	·	1.6 km	MPC · JPL
595525	2003 GJ_{6}	—	April 2, 2003	Socorro	LINEAR	·	2.1 km	MPC · JPL
595526	2003 GO_{25}	—	March 22, 2003	Ondřejov	L. Kotková	·	1.6 km	MPC · JPL
595527	2003 GR_{25}	—	April 4, 2003	Kitt Peak	Spacewatch	·	1.5 km	MPC · JPL
595528	2003 GS_{38}	—	April 7, 2003	Kitt Peak	Spacewatch	·	2.3 km	MPC · JPL
595529	2003 GT_{57}	—	June 16, 2005	Kitt Peak	Spacewatch	L4	9.3 km	MPC · JPL
595530	2003 GV_{57}	—	April 7, 2007	Mount Lemmon	Mount Lemmon Survey	·	1.6 km	MPC · JPL
595531	2003 GA_{58}	—	January 25, 2009	Kitt Peak	Spacewatch	·	710 m	MPC · JPL
595532	2003 GY_{58}	—	March 4, 2016	Haleakala	Pan-STARRS 1	H	360 m	MPC · JPL
595533	2003 GH_{59}	—	April 7, 2003	Kitt Peak	Spacewatch	L4	6.8 km	MPC · JPL
595534	2003 GS_{59}	—	May 22, 2015	Haleakala	Pan-STARRS 1	·	2.2 km	MPC · JPL
595535	2003 GD_{62}	—	October 26, 2011	Haleakala	Pan-STARRS 1	EOS	1.5 km	MPC · JPL
595536	2003 GH_{62}	—	April 8, 2003	Kitt Peak	Spacewatch	·	1.0 km	MPC · JPL
595537	2003 GL_{62}	—	May 3, 2014	Kitt Peak	Spacewatch	·	1.4 km	MPC · JPL
595538	2003 GO_{64}	—	November 8, 2010	Mount Lemmon	Mount Lemmon Survey	L4	7.1 km	MPC · JPL
595539	2003 GF_{66}	—	April 7, 2003	Kitt Peak	Spacewatch	·	1.1 km	MPC · JPL
595540	2003 GN_{66}	—	April 1, 2003	Apache Point	SDSS Collaboration	·	1.6 km	MPC · JPL
595541	2003 HB_{7}	—	April 24, 2003	Kitt Peak	Spacewatch	·	1.5 km	MPC · JPL
595542	2003 HK_{34}	—	April 29, 2003	Kitt Peak	Spacewatch	·	600 m	MPC · JPL
595543	2003 HC_{50}	—	April 30, 2003	Kitt Peak	Spacewatch	·	510 m	MPC · JPL
595544	2003 HS_{53}	—	October 25, 2005	Kitt Peak	Spacewatch	·	1.3 km	MPC · JPL
595545	2003 HH_{59}	—	December 1, 2005	Kitt Peak	Spacewatch	MAR	1.1 km	MPC · JPL
595546	2003 HG_{60}	—	February 16, 2015	Haleakala	Pan-STARRS 1	EUN	1.1 km	MPC · JPL
595547	2003 HA_{61}	—	April 29, 2003	Kitt Peak	Spacewatch	GEF	1.2 km	MPC · JPL
595548	2003 HQ_{61}	—	April 28, 2003	Kitt Peak	Spacewatch	·	2.0 km	MPC · JPL
595549	2003 HZ_{63}	—	February 14, 2013	Haleakala	Pan-STARRS 1	·	1.5 km	MPC · JPL
595550	2003 HJ_{64}	—	November 21, 2008	Mount Lemmon	Mount Lemmon Survey	·	970 m	MPC · JPL
595551	2003 HQ_{64}	—	August 14, 2015	Haleakala	Pan-STARRS 1	EOS	1.4 km	MPC · JPL
595552	2003 HS_{64}	—	April 29, 2003	Kitt Peak	Spacewatch	·	2.0 km	MPC · JPL
595553	2003 HP_{65}	—	April 25, 2003	Kitt Peak	Spacewatch	·	1.2 km	MPC · JPL
595554	2003 JV	—	May 1, 2003	Kitt Peak	Spacewatch	·	2.2 km	MPC · JPL
595555	2003 JL_{4}	—	May 1, 2003	Kitt Peak	Spacewatch	·	2.2 km	MPC · JPL
595556	2003 JQ_{14}	—	April 28, 1992	Kitt Peak	Spacewatch	·	2.6 km	MPC · JPL
595557	2003 JT_{18}	—	May 1, 2003	Kitt Peak	Spacewatch	·	2.0 km	MPC · JPL
595558	2003 JN_{19}	—	May 11, 2003	Kitt Peak	Spacewatch	·	1.2 km	MPC · JPL
595559	2003 JV_{19}	—	May 2, 2003	Kitt Peak	Spacewatch	(5)	770 m	MPC · JPL
595560	2003 JK_{20}	—	March 27, 2008	Mount Lemmon	Mount Lemmon Survey	·	1.7 km	MPC · JPL
595561	2003 JN_{20}	—	May 2, 2003	Kitt Peak	Spacewatch	H	370 m	MPC · JPL
595562	2003 JB_{21}	—	May 2, 2003	Kitt Peak	Spacewatch	·	2.5 km	MPC · JPL
595563	2003 JF_{21}	—	November 8, 2009	Mount Lemmon	Mount Lemmon Survey	L4	7.2 km	MPC · JPL
595564	2003 KQ_{1}	—	May 22, 2003	Kitt Peak	Spacewatch	·	2.5 km	MPC · JPL
595565	2003 KS_{6}	—	May 25, 2003	Kitt Peak	Spacewatch	·	1.2 km	MPC · JPL
595566	2003 KB_{8}	—	May 1, 2003	Kitt Peak	Spacewatch	·	990 m	MPC · JPL
595567	2003 KE_{15}	—	May 25, 2003	Kitt Peak	Spacewatch	·	2.8 km	MPC · JPL
595568	2003 KU_{15}	—	May 27, 2003	Kitt Peak	Spacewatch	H	470 m	MPC · JPL
595569	2003 KC_{20}	—	May 24, 2003	Kitt Peak	Spacewatch	T_{j} (2.94)	2.4 km	MPC · JPL
595570	2003 KX_{26}	—	May 31, 2003	Cerro Tololo	Deep Ecliptic Survey	HNS	1.0 km	MPC · JPL
595571	2003 KF_{37}	—	May 24, 2003	Kitt Peak	Spacewatch	·	670 m	MPC · JPL
595572	2003 KE_{38}	—	January 3, 2012	Mount Lemmon	Mount Lemmon Survey	·	2.2 km	MPC · JPL
595573	2003 LB_{1}	—	June 2, 2003	Kitt Peak	Spacewatch	·	2.3 km	MPC · JPL
595574	2003 LR_{9}	—	April 18, 2007	Kitt Peak	Spacewatch	·	950 m	MPC · JPL
595575	2003 LT_{9}	—	October 9, 2007	Mount Lemmon	Mount Lemmon Survey	·	590 m	MPC · JPL
595576	2003 LC_{11}	—	March 30, 2008	Kitt Peak	Spacewatch	·	1.9 km	MPC · JPL
595577	2003 LE_{11}	—	August 10, 2015	Haleakala	Pan-STARRS 1	·	2.2 km	MPC · JPL
595578	2003 LW_{11}	—	October 26, 2011	Haleakala	Pan-STARRS 1	V	500 m	MPC · JPL
595579	2003 OF_{8}	—	July 25, 2003	Reedy Creek	J. Broughton	·	810 m	MPC · JPL
595580	2003 OG_{11}	—	May 28, 2003	Kitt Peak	Spacewatch	·	1.4 km	MPC · JPL
595581	2003 OQ_{15}	—	July 23, 2003	Palomar	NEAT	·	1.7 km	MPC · JPL
595582	2003 OP_{31}	—	June 6, 2003	Kitt Peak	Spacewatch	·	1.2 km	MPC · JPL
595583 Annabelkarun	2003 OR_{34}	Annabelkarun	July 31, 2003	Mauna Kea	D. D. Balam, K. M. Perrett	·	1.1 km	MPC · JPL
595584	2003 OG_{35}	—	September 21, 2012	Kitt Peak	Spacewatch	·	1.1 km	MPC · JPL
595585	2003 PH_{2}	—	July 23, 2003	Socorro	LINEAR	·	720 m	MPC · JPL
595586	2003 QD_{2}	—	August 19, 2003	Campo Imperatore	CINEOS	T_{j} (2.98) · 3:2	6.9 km	MPC · JPL
595587	2003 QR_{47}	—	July 30, 2003	Palomar	NEAT	EUN	1.5 km	MPC · JPL
595588	2003 QW_{72}	—	August 24, 2003	Palomar	NEAT	·	1.0 km	MPC · JPL
595589	2003 QF_{90}	—	August 26, 2003	Cerro Tololo	Deep Ecliptic Survey	·	1.1 km	MPC · JPL
595590 Raphaelroose	2003 QG_{104}	Raphaelroose	August 24, 2003	Saint-Sulpice	B. Christophe	EUN	1.4 km	MPC · JPL
595591	2003 QV_{108}	—	August 31, 2003	Kitt Peak	Spacewatch	·	1.4 km	MPC · JPL
595592	2003 QC_{116}	—	August 26, 1998	Kitt Peak	Spacewatch	·	2.3 km	MPC · JPL
595593	2003 QS_{120}	—	August 28, 2003	Palomar	NEAT	·	1.4 km	MPC · JPL
595594	2003 QH_{121}	—	March 15, 2012	Mount Lemmon	Mount Lemmon Survey	·	2.8 km	MPC · JPL
595595	2003 QL_{122}	—	November 24, 2012	Kitt Peak	Spacewatch	EUN	1.3 km	MPC · JPL
595596	2003 QT_{122}	—	August 21, 2003	Palomar	NEAT	·	810 m	MPC · JPL
595597	2003 QO_{123}	—	August 24, 2003	Cerro Tololo	Deep Ecliptic Survey	·	1.0 km	MPC · JPL
595598	2003 QR_{123}	—	July 7, 2014	Haleakala	Pan-STARRS 1	LIX	2.7 km	MPC · JPL
595599	2003 QL_{124}	—	August 25, 2003	Cerro Tololo	Deep Ecliptic Survey	·	2.2 km	MPC · JPL
595600	2003 QZ_{125}	—	August 22, 2003	Campo Imperatore	CINEOS	·	1.4 km	MPC · JPL

== 595601–595700 ==
back to top

Designation			Discovery			Properties		Ref
Permanent	Provisional	Named after	Date	Site	Discoverer(s)	Category	Diam.	Ref
595601	2003 RX_{27}	—	November 14, 2007	Mount Lemmon	Mount Lemmon Survey	·	920 m	MPC · JPL
595602	2003 RL_{28}	—	April 2, 2013	Kitt Peak	Spacewatch	·	2.4 km	MPC · JPL
595603	2003 RV_{28}	—	September 4, 2003	Kitt Peak	Spacewatch	AST	1.3 km	MPC · JPL
595604	2003 SA_{1}	—	September 16, 2003	Kitt Peak	Spacewatch	·	490 m	MPC · JPL
595605	2003 SV_{9}	—	September 17, 2003	Kitt Peak	Spacewatch	·	1.6 km	MPC · JPL
595606	2003 SL_{21}	—	August 25, 2003	Palomar	NEAT	·	2.0 km	MPC · JPL
595607	2003 SK_{24}	—	September 17, 2003	Palomar	NEAT	·	1.0 km	MPC · JPL
595608	2003 SV_{27}	—	September 18, 2003	Palomar	NEAT	·	830 m	MPC · JPL
595609	2003 SU_{32}	—	September 17, 2003	Uccle	T. Pauwels	·	2.2 km	MPC · JPL
595610	2003 SD_{50}	—	September 13, 2003	Haleakala	NEAT	EUN	1.4 km	MPC · JPL
595611	2003 SC_{57}	—	September 2, 2003	Socorro	LINEAR	·	2.1 km	MPC · JPL
595612	2003 ST_{68}	—	August 28, 2003	Socorro	LINEAR	·	710 m	MPC · JPL
595613	2003 SS_{73}	—	September 18, 2003	Kitt Peak	Spacewatch	·	2.4 km	MPC · JPL
595614	2003 SQ_{81}	—	September 19, 2003	Haleakala	NEAT	·	1.0 km	MPC · JPL
595615	2003 ST_{106}	—	September 20, 2003	Kitt Peak	Spacewatch	·	1.3 km	MPC · JPL
595616	2003 SN_{114}	—	September 16, 2003	Kitt Peak	Spacewatch	·	700 m	MPC · JPL
595617	2003 SS_{126}	—	August 27, 2003	Haleakala	NEAT	·	1.8 km	MPC · JPL
595618	2003 SB_{127}	—	September 4, 2003	Kitt Peak	Spacewatch	MAR	800 m	MPC · JPL
595619	2003 SP_{131}	—	September 18, 2003	Kitt Peak	Spacewatch	·	2.7 km	MPC · JPL
595620	2003 SB_{138}	—	September 18, 2003	Palomar	NEAT	H	630 m	MPC · JPL
595621	2003 SC_{153}	—	September 20, 2003	Palomar	NEAT	·	1.5 km	MPC · JPL
595622	2003 SX_{155}	—	September 20, 2003	Socorro	LINEAR	·	610 m	MPC · JPL
595623	2003 SF_{159}	—	September 20, 2003	Kitt Peak	Spacewatch	·	1.0 km	MPC · JPL
595624	2003 SM_{159}	—	September 21, 2003	Kitt Peak	Spacewatch	·	1.7 km	MPC · JPL
595625	2003 ST_{163}	—	August 26, 2003	Cerro Tololo	Deep Ecliptic Survey	DOR	1.9 km	MPC · JPL
595626	2003 SJ_{212}	—	September 16, 2003	Socorro	LINEAR	·	1.1 km	MPC · JPL
595627	2003 SG_{230}	—	September 24, 2003	Palomar	NEAT	·	630 m	MPC · JPL
595628	2003 SD_{237}	—	September 16, 2003	Palomar	NEAT	(5)	1.2 km	MPC · JPL
595629	2003 SZ_{239}	—	September 27, 2003	Kitt Peak	Spacewatch	T_{j} (2.99) · EUP	2.8 km	MPC · JPL
595630	2003 SE_{288}	—	September 30, 2003	Kitt Peak	Spacewatch	EUN	990 m	MPC · JPL
595631	2003 SM_{289}	—	September 28, 2003	Socorro	LINEAR	·	560 m	MPC · JPL
595632	2003 SC_{300}	—	September 20, 2003	Socorro	LINEAR	·	1.0 km	MPC · JPL
595633	2003 SV_{303}	—	September 19, 2003	Anderson Mesa	LONEOS	·	1.9 km	MPC · JPL
595634	2003 SN_{340}	—	September 16, 2003	Palomar	NEAT	·	690 m	MPC · JPL
595635	2003 SU_{341}	—	September 17, 2003	Kitt Peak	Spacewatch	·	3.9 km	MPC · JPL
595636	2003 SQ_{343}	—	September 17, 2003	Kitt Peak	Spacewatch	·	1.5 km	MPC · JPL
595637	2003 SF_{344}	—	September 17, 2003	Kitt Peak	Spacewatch	·	1.4 km	MPC · JPL
595638	2003 SY_{344}	—	September 18, 2003	Kitt Peak	Spacewatch	·	2.3 km	MPC · JPL
595639	2003 SF_{345}	—	September 18, 2003	Kitt Peak	Spacewatch	EUN	740 m	MPC · JPL
595640	2003 ST_{345}	—	September 18, 2003	Palomar	NEAT	(2076)	950 m	MPC · JPL
595641	2003 SR_{353}	—	September 21, 2003	Palomar	NEAT	·	2.4 km	MPC · JPL
595642	2003 SC_{359}	—	September 21, 2003	Kitt Peak	Spacewatch	·	730 m	MPC · JPL
595643	2003 SA_{367}	—	September 16, 2003	Kitt Peak	Spacewatch	·	840 m	MPC · JPL
595644	2003 SS_{374}	—	September 26, 2003	Apache Point	SDSS Collaboration	·	2.4 km	MPC · JPL
595645	2003 SH_{376}	—	September 26, 2003	Apache Point	SDSS Collaboration	·	520 m	MPC · JPL
595646	2003 SC_{388}	—	October 2, 2003	Kitt Peak	Spacewatch	·	1.1 km	MPC · JPL
595647	2003 SG_{392}	—	September 26, 2003	Apache Point	SDSS Collaboration	·	1.3 km	MPC · JPL
595648	2003 ST_{402}	—	September 27, 2003	Kitt Peak	Spacewatch	AGN	1.1 km	MPC · JPL
595649	2003 SL_{404}	—	October 16, 2003	Palomar	NEAT	EUN	1.2 km	MPC · JPL
595650	2003 SM_{409}	—	September 28, 2003	Kitt Peak	Spacewatch	·	640 m	MPC · JPL
595651	2003 SK_{410}	—	September 18, 2003	Kitt Peak	Spacewatch	·	1.2 km	MPC · JPL
595652	2003 SB_{411}	—	September 27, 2003	Kitt Peak	Spacewatch	·	420 m	MPC · JPL
595653	2003 SK_{414}	—	September 18, 2003	Kitt Peak	Spacewatch	EUN	960 m	MPC · JPL
595654	2003 SD_{418}	—	September 28, 2003	Apache Point	SDSS	V	500 m	MPC · JPL
595655	2003 SM_{418}	—	September 28, 2003	Apache Point	SDSS	·	3.1 km	MPC · JPL
595656	2003 SU_{418}	—	September 28, 2003	Apache Point	SDSS	·	970 m	MPC · JPL
595657	2003 SC_{426}	—	February 1, 2006	Mount Lemmon	Mount Lemmon Survey	·	2.3 km	MPC · JPL
595658	2003 SL_{426}	—	September 25, 2003	Mauna Kea	P. A. Wiegert	MAS	710 m	MPC · JPL
595659	2003 SF_{435}	—	September 28, 2003	Kitt Peak	Spacewatch	·	1.2 km	MPC · JPL
595660	2003 SL_{436}	—	September 18, 2003	Kitt Peak	Spacewatch	·	1.7 km	MPC · JPL
595661	2003 SO_{436}	—	September 16, 2003	Kitt Peak	Spacewatch	·	700 m	MPC · JPL
595662	2003 SQ_{436}	—	January 17, 2005	Kitt Peak	Spacewatch	·	1.6 km	MPC · JPL
595663	2003 SW_{436}	—	September 21, 2003	Kitt Peak	Spacewatch	·	680 m	MPC · JPL
595664	2003 SE_{439}	—	September 28, 2003	Kitt Peak	Spacewatch	·	680 m	MPC · JPL
595665	2003 SN_{439}	—	September 21, 2003	Kitt Peak	Spacewatch	·	690 m	MPC · JPL
595666	2003 SO_{439}	—	October 19, 2012	Mount Lemmon	Mount Lemmon Survey	HNS	1.1 km	MPC · JPL
595667	2003 SK_{440}	—	July 17, 2016	Haleakala	Pan-STARRS 1	·	1.1 km	MPC · JPL
595668	2003 SG_{442}	—	September 21, 2003	Kitt Peak	Spacewatch	·	690 m	MPC · JPL
595669	2003 SJ_{442}	—	June 13, 2015	Mount Lemmon	Mount Lemmon Survey	·	1.4 km	MPC · JPL
595670	2003 SG_{443}	—	September 18, 2003	Kitt Peak	Spacewatch	HNS	920 m	MPC · JPL
595671	2003 SO_{444}	—	June 12, 2013	Haleakala	Pan-STARRS 1	·	660 m	MPC · JPL
595672	2003 SP_{444}	—	October 14, 2012	Kitt Peak	Spacewatch	·	1.2 km	MPC · JPL
595673	2003 SV_{444}	—	September 28, 2003	Apache Point	SDSS Collaboration	·	720 m	MPC · JPL
595674	2003 SP_{445}	—	September 12, 2015	Haleakala	Pan-STARRS 1	·	2.5 km	MPC · JPL
595675	2003 SV_{446}	—	January 29, 2012	Mount Lemmon	Mount Lemmon Survey	·	2.5 km	MPC · JPL
595676	2003 SR_{450}	—	February 17, 2010	Kitt Peak	Spacewatch	EUN	920 m	MPC · JPL
595677	2003 SS_{452}	—	January 21, 2015	Haleakala	Pan-STARRS 1	HOF	2.2 km	MPC · JPL
595678	2003 SK_{454}	—	June 28, 2011	Mount Lemmon	Mount Lemmon Survey	KON	1.6 km	MPC · JPL
595679	2003 SB_{458}	—	September 21, 2003	Kitt Peak	Spacewatch	·	1.0 km	MPC · JPL
595680	2003 SO_{459}	—	October 25, 2009	Kitt Peak	Spacewatch	·	1.9 km	MPC · JPL
595681	2003 SN_{462}	—	September 19, 2003	Kitt Peak	Spacewatch	·	1.2 km	MPC · JPL
595682	2003 SV_{462}	—	April 25, 2015	Haleakala	Pan-STARRS 1	·	1.0 km	MPC · JPL
595683	2003 SM_{465}	—	September 30, 2003	Kitt Peak	Spacewatch	H	330 m	MPC · JPL
595684	2003 SQ_{465}	—	September 22, 2003	Kitt Peak	Spacewatch	·	1.4 km	MPC · JPL
595685	2003 SG_{467}	—	September 22, 2003	Kitt Peak	Spacewatch	·	600 m	MPC · JPL
595686	2003 SM_{468}	—	September 30, 2003	Kitt Peak	Spacewatch	·	1.4 km	MPC · JPL
595687	2003 SU_{473}	—	September 21, 2003	Kitt Peak	Spacewatch	·	980 m	MPC · JPL
595688	2003 SW_{473}	—	September 19, 2003	Kitt Peak	Spacewatch	·	1.5 km	MPC · JPL
595689	2003 TO_{1}	—	October 1, 2003	Kitt Peak	Spacewatch	·	1.0 km	MPC · JPL
595690	2003 TC_{4}	—	October 2, 2003	Kitt Peak	Spacewatch	·	1.4 km	MPC · JPL
595691	2003 TY_{39}	—	October 2, 2003	Kitt Peak	Spacewatch	·	2.9 km	MPC · JPL
595692	2003 TT_{56}	—	October 5, 2003	Kitt Peak	Spacewatch	·	1.5 km	MPC · JPL
595693	2003 TD_{60}	—	October 16, 2012	Catalina	CSS	·	1.8 km	MPC · JPL
595694	2003 TJ_{61}	—	October 1, 2003	Kitt Peak	Spacewatch	·	1.3 km	MPC · JPL
595695	2003 TP_{61}	—	October 1, 2003	Kitt Peak	Spacewatch	·	1.5 km	MPC · JPL
595696	2003 TC_{65}	—	October 3, 2003	Kitt Peak	Spacewatch	ADE	1.6 km	MPC · JPL
595697	2003 TU_{65}	—	October 1, 2003	Kitt Peak	Spacewatch	·	800 m	MPC · JPL
595698	2003 UG_{6}	—	October 16, 2003	Palomar	NEAT	·	2.3 km	MPC · JPL
595699	2003 UU_{12}	—	October 16, 2003	Kitt Peak	Spacewatch	·	1.5 km	MPC · JPL
595700	2003 UJ_{31}	—	October 16, 2003	Kitt Peak	Spacewatch	(5)	1.1 km	MPC · JPL

== 595701–595800 ==
back to top

Designation			Discovery			Properties		Ref
Permanent	Provisional	Named after	Date	Site	Discoverer(s)	Category	Diam.	Ref
595701	2003 UP_{34}	—	October 16, 2003	Palomar	NEAT	·	420 m	MPC · JPL
595702	2003 UX_{55}	—	August 28, 2003	Palomar	NEAT	·	1.1 km	MPC · JPL
595703	2003 UE_{59}	—	October 16, 2003	Palomar	NEAT	·	680 m	MPC · JPL
595704	2003 UP_{68}	—	October 18, 2003	Kitt Peak	Spacewatch	·	1.1 km	MPC · JPL
595705	2003 UK_{69}	—	September 28, 2003	Kitt Peak	Spacewatch	·	910 m	MPC · JPL
595706	2003 UP_{74}	—	September 30, 2003	Kitt Peak	Spacewatch	·	1.4 km	MPC · JPL
595707	2003 UZ_{84}	—	October 18, 2003	Kitt Peak	Spacewatch	·	1.4 km	MPC · JPL
595708	2003 UP_{94}	—	September 18, 2003	Kitt Peak	Spacewatch	·	1.7 km	MPC · JPL
595709	2003 UP_{101}	—	September 28, 2003	Anderson Mesa	LONEOS	·	2.6 km	MPC · JPL
595710	2003 UJ_{129}	—	October 18, 2003	Palomar	NEAT	PHO	1.2 km	MPC · JPL
595711	2003 UA_{149}	—	October 19, 2003	Palomar	NEAT	ADE	2.5 km	MPC · JPL
595712	2003 UR_{154}	—	October 20, 2003	Kitt Peak	Spacewatch	·	780 m	MPC · JPL
595713	2003 UB_{202}	—	September 19, 2003	Kitt Peak	Spacewatch	·	1.2 km	MPC · JPL
595714	2003 UR_{210}	—	October 23, 2003	Kitt Peak	Spacewatch	·	690 m	MPC · JPL
595715	2003 UM_{221}	—	September 29, 2003	Socorro	LINEAR	·	2.1 km	MPC · JPL
595716	2003 UX_{251}	—	September 23, 2003	Palomar	NEAT	·	810 m	MPC · JPL
595717	2003 UK_{255}	—	October 20, 2003	Socorro	LINEAR	·	1.6 km	MPC · JPL
595718	2003 UZ_{266}	—	October 23, 2003	Kitt Peak	Spacewatch	·	1.0 km	MPC · JPL
595719	2003 UX_{283}	—	October 23, 2003	Kitt Peak	Spacewatch	·	860 m	MPC · JPL
595720	2003 UR_{289}	—	September 22, 2003	Kitt Peak	Spacewatch	·	2.1 km	MPC · JPL
595721	2003 UZ_{302}	—	October 17, 2003	Kitt Peak	Spacewatch	(31811)	2.3 km	MPC · JPL
595722	2003 UJ_{309}	—	October 19, 2003	Kitt Peak	Spacewatch	·	2.8 km	MPC · JPL
595723	2003 UQ_{319}	—	October 20, 2003	Socorro	LINEAR	EUN	1.4 km	MPC · JPL
595724	2003 UB_{323}	—	October 16, 2003	Kitt Peak	Spacewatch	(11882)	1.4 km	MPC · JPL
595725	2003 UQ_{327}	—	September 30, 2003	Kitt Peak	Spacewatch	·	1.8 km	MPC · JPL
595726	2003 UN_{329}	—	September 17, 2003	Kitt Peak	Spacewatch	·	870 m	MPC · JPL
595727	2003 UW_{329}	—	October 17, 2003	Kitt Peak	Spacewatch	JUN	820 m	MPC · JPL
595728	2003 UP_{332}	—	October 18, 2003	Apache Point	SDSS Collaboration	·	1.3 km	MPC · JPL
595729	2003 UE_{335}	—	October 18, 2003	Apache Point	SDSS Collaboration	·	1.2 km	MPC · JPL
595730	2003 UL_{342}	—	September 30, 2003	Kitt Peak	Spacewatch	EUN	1.4 km	MPC · JPL
595731	2003 UL_{353}	—	October 19, 2003	Apache Point	SDSS Collaboration	·	1.1 km	MPC · JPL
595732	2003 UG_{361}	—	September 29, 2003	Kitt Peak	Spacewatch	·	480 m	MPC · JPL
595733	2003 UP_{362}	—	October 20, 2003	Kitt Peak	Spacewatch	·	1.7 km	MPC · JPL
595734	2003 UL_{378}	—	September 29, 2003	Kitt Peak	Spacewatch	·	1.7 km	MPC · JPL
595735	2003 UM_{380}	—	April 1, 2005	Kitt Peak	Spacewatch	·	1.7 km	MPC · JPL
595736	2003 UV_{395}	—	October 22, 2003	Apache Point	SDSS Collaboration	·	1.8 km	MPC · JPL
595737	2003 UU_{399}	—	September 21, 2003	Anderson Mesa	LONEOS	·	540 m	MPC · JPL
595738	2003 UJ_{400}	—	July 4, 2003	Kitt Peak	Spacewatch	·	1.7 km	MPC · JPL
595739	2003 UW_{405}	—	October 23, 2003	Apache Point	SDSS	·	450 m	MPC · JPL
595740	2003 UV_{406}	—	October 23, 2003	Apache Point	SDSS Collaboration	·	780 m	MPC · JPL
595741	2003 UY_{407}	—	October 23, 2003	Apache Point	SDSS Collaboration	·	700 m	MPC · JPL
595742	2003 UK_{413}	—	October 29, 2003	Kitt Peak	Spacewatch	·	1.2 km	MPC · JPL
595743	2003 UV_{419}	—	October 22, 2003	Kitt Peak	Spacewatch	·	870 m	MPC · JPL
595744	2003 UE_{420}	—	November 23, 2008	Kitt Peak	Spacewatch	·	1.4 km	MPC · JPL
595745	2003 UM_{421}	—	October 22, 2003	Kitt Peak	Spacewatch	·	1.7 km	MPC · JPL
595746	2003 UN_{422}	—	March 3, 2009	Kitt Peak	Spacewatch	·	800 m	MPC · JPL
595747	2003 UE_{424}	—	November 17, 2014	Mount Lemmon	Mount Lemmon Survey	·	850 m	MPC · JPL
595748	2003 UE_{425}	—	October 18, 2012	Haleakala	Pan-STARRS 1	·	1.4 km	MPC · JPL
595749	2003 UX_{425}	—	August 24, 2003	Palomar	NEAT	·	1.4 km	MPC · JPL
595750	2003 UN_{426}	—	October 17, 2010	Mount Lemmon	Mount Lemmon Survey	·	710 m	MPC · JPL
595751	2003 UD_{427}	—	May 28, 2009	Mount Lemmon	Mount Lemmon Survey	·	860 m	MPC · JPL
595752	2003 UG_{427}	—	November 22, 2014	Mount Lemmon	Mount Lemmon Survey	V	470 m	MPC · JPL
595753	2003 UX_{429}	—	October 22, 2003	Apache Point	SDSS Collaboration	·	900 m	MPC · JPL
595754	2003 UX_{431}	—	April 17, 2013	Haleakala	Pan-STARRS 1	·	2.9 km	MPC · JPL
595755	2003 UZ_{431}	—	October 23, 2003	Apache Point	SDSS Collaboration	·	1.4 km	MPC · JPL
595756	2003 UP_{432}	—	February 24, 2014	Haleakala	Pan-STARRS 1	·	1.6 km	MPC · JPL
595757	2003 UR_{432}	—	October 21, 2003	Kitt Peak	Spacewatch	NYS	920 m	MPC · JPL
595758	2003 US_{432}	—	April 25, 2006	Kitt Peak	Spacewatch	·	1.9 km	MPC · JPL
595759	2003 UB_{433}	—	May 14, 2015	Haleakala	Pan-STARRS 1	GAL	1.2 km	MPC · JPL
595760	2003 UV_{433}	—	April 22, 2009	Mount Lemmon	Mount Lemmon Survey	·	500 m	MPC · JPL
595761	2003 UJ_{434}	—	February 27, 2014	Kitt Peak	Spacewatch	·	1.5 km	MPC · JPL
595762	2003 UR_{435}	—	March 27, 2012	Kitt Peak	Spacewatch	·	490 m	MPC · JPL
595763	2003 UC_{437}	—	May 5, 2013	Haleakala	Pan-STARRS 1	(895)	2.2 km	MPC · JPL
595764	2003 UQ_{438}	—	December 30, 2007	Kitt Peak	Spacewatch	·	850 m	MPC · JPL
595765	2003 UY_{438}	—	April 1, 2012	Mount Lemmon	Mount Lemmon Survey	·	770 m	MPC · JPL
595766	2003 UX_{439}	—	June 3, 2014	Haleakala	Pan-STARRS 1	·	2.6 km	MPC · JPL
595767	2003 US_{445}	—	October 18, 2003	Anderson Mesa	LONEOS	·	1.3 km	MPC · JPL
595768	2003 UR_{446}	—	October 16, 2003	Kitt Peak	Spacewatch	THM	1.7 km	MPC · JPL
595769	2003 VE_{7}	—	November 15, 2003	Kitt Peak	Spacewatch	·	1.9 km	MPC · JPL
595770	2003 VQ_{12}	—	January 11, 2008	Catalina	CSS	·	800 m	MPC · JPL
595771	2003 WL_{35}	—	January 7, 2000	Kitt Peak	Spacewatch	·	1.8 km	MPC · JPL
595772	2003 WA_{108}	—	September 20, 2003	Palomar	NEAT	·	1.8 km	MPC · JPL
595773	2003 WK_{133}	—	November 15, 2003	Palomar	NEAT	·	1.9 km	MPC · JPL
595774	2003 WR_{156}	—	November 19, 2003	Palomar	NEAT	(1547)	1.6 km	MPC · JPL
595775	2003 WN_{160}	—	November 30, 2003	Kitt Peak	Spacewatch	MAS	610 m	MPC · JPL
595776	2003 WL_{163}	—	November 30, 2003	Kitt Peak	Spacewatch	·	1.7 km	MPC · JPL
595777	2003 WQ_{174}	—	November 19, 2003	Kitt Peak	Spacewatch	·	730 m	MPC · JPL
595778	2003 WX_{174}	—	October 2, 2003	Kitt Peak	Spacewatch	·	730 m	MPC · JPL
595779	2003 WR_{175}	—	November 19, 2003	Kitt Peak	Spacewatch	(5)	790 m	MPC · JPL
595780	2003 WC_{189}	—	November 19, 2003	Palomar	NEAT	PHO	820 m	MPC · JPL
595781	2003 WD_{189}	—	November 19, 2003	Palomar	NEAT	·	2.5 km	MPC · JPL
595782	2003 WL_{196}	—	December 22, 2008	Mount Lemmon	Mount Lemmon Survey	·	1.8 km	MPC · JPL
595783	2003 WT_{196}	—	October 2, 2010	Mount Lemmon	Mount Lemmon Survey	·	1.1 km	MPC · JPL
595784	2003 WU_{196}	—	October 12, 2007	Mount Lemmon	Mount Lemmon Survey	ADE	1.9 km	MPC · JPL
595785	2003 WW_{197}	—	November 19, 2003	Anderson Mesa	LONEOS	·	810 m	MPC · JPL
595786	2003 WW_{199}	—	March 30, 1997	Kitt Peak	Spacewatch	·	2.7 km	MPC · JPL
595787	2003 WZ_{199}	—	November 7, 2012	Haleakala	Pan-STARRS 1	·	1.6 km	MPC · JPL
595788	2003 WT_{200}	—	June 14, 2015	Mount Lemmon	Mount Lemmon Survey	·	1.9 km	MPC · JPL
595789	2003 WD_{201}	—	June 25, 2011	Kitt Peak	Spacewatch	·	1.4 km	MPC · JPL
595790	2003 WH_{201}	—	September 4, 2010	Kitt Peak	Spacewatch	·	790 m	MPC · JPL
595791	2003 WY_{204}	—	March 16, 2010	Mount Lemmon	Mount Lemmon Survey	·	1.5 km	MPC · JPL
595792	2003 WT_{205}	—	October 20, 2016	Mount Lemmon	Mount Lemmon Survey	·	1.4 km	MPC · JPL
595793	2003 WA_{206}	—	January 18, 2008	Kitt Peak	Spacewatch	MAS	540 m	MPC · JPL
595794	2003 WS_{206}	—	December 30, 2007	Kitt Peak	Spacewatch	·	760 m	MPC · JPL
595795	2003 WJ_{209}	—	November 26, 2003	Kitt Peak	Spacewatch	(5)	1.0 km	MPC · JPL
595796	2003 WX_{210}	—	January 2, 2009	Mount Lemmon	Mount Lemmon Survey	·	1.4 km	MPC · JPL
595797	2003 WV_{212}	—	February 5, 2016	Haleakala	Pan-STARRS 1	MAS	550 m	MPC · JPL
595798	2003 WF_{216}	—	November 19, 2003	Kitt Peak	Spacewatch	·	2.4 km	MPC · JPL
595799	2003 WX_{216}	—	November 21, 2003	Kitt Peak	Spacewatch	BRG	850 m	MPC · JPL
595800	2003 XJ_{44}	—	February 3, 2009	Mount Lemmon	Mount Lemmon Survey	·	1.7 km	MPC · JPL

== 595801–595900 ==
back to top

Designation			Discovery			Properties		Ref
Permanent	Provisional	Named after	Date	Site	Discoverer(s)	Category	Diam.	Ref
595801	2003 YP_{15}	—	November 21, 2003	Socorro	LINEAR	JUN	950 m	MPC · JPL
595802	2003 YU_{30}	—	December 18, 2003	Socorro	LINEAR	·	1.6 km	MPC · JPL
595803	2003 YG_{110}	—	December 23, 2003	Socorro	LINEAR	·	840 m	MPC · JPL
595804	2003 YU_{122}	—	December 27, 2003	Socorro	LINEAR	HNS	1.4 km	MPC · JPL
595805	2003 YH_{183}	—	April 14, 2005	Catalina	CSS	·	1.8 km	MPC · JPL
595806	2003 YW_{184}	—	October 15, 2012	Haleakala	Pan-STARRS 1	KOR	1.2 km	MPC · JPL
595807	2003 YE_{185}	—	December 21, 2003	Kitt Peak	Spacewatch	DOR	2.3 km	MPC · JPL
595808	2003 YO_{186}	—	December 22, 2003	Kitt Peak	Spacewatch	·	1.1 km	MPC · JPL
595809	2003 YB_{187}	—	December 31, 2008	Mount Lemmon	Mount Lemmon Survey	·	1.7 km	MPC · JPL
595810	2003 YN_{188}	—	February 27, 2009	Mount Lemmon	Mount Lemmon Survey	·	1.6 km	MPC · JPL
595811	2003 YT_{188}	—	November 7, 2012	Mount Lemmon	Mount Lemmon Survey	·	1.3 km	MPC · JPL
595812	2003 YQ_{189}	—	October 11, 2007	Mount Lemmon	Mount Lemmon Survey	·	1.3 km	MPC · JPL
595813	2004 AA_{16}	—	December 27, 2003	Kitt Peak	Spacewatch	NYS	1 km	MPC · JPL
595814	2004 BH_{57}	—	January 23, 2004	Socorro	LINEAR	·	1.9 km	MPC · JPL
595815	2004 BV_{64}	—	January 22, 2004	Socorro	LINEAR	·	1.7 km	MPC · JPL
595816	2004 BO_{69}	—	January 19, 2004	Kitt Peak	Spacewatch	H	390 m	MPC · JPL
595817	2004 BW_{76}	—	January 16, 2004	Palomar	NEAT	·	1.5 km	MPC · JPL
595818	2004 BJ_{82}	—	January 27, 2004	Anderson Mesa	LONEOS	·	930 m	MPC · JPL
595819	2004 BQ_{116}	—	January 27, 2004	Catalina	CSS	·	1.3 km	MPC · JPL
595820	2004 BG_{164}	—	December 31, 2008	Catalina	CSS	·	2.3 km	MPC · JPL
595821	2004 BJ_{165}	—	October 15, 2007	Mount Lemmon	Mount Lemmon Survey	·	1.8 km	MPC · JPL
595822	2004 BS_{169}	—	November 8, 2007	Mount Lemmon	Mount Lemmon Survey	HOF	2.1 km	MPC · JPL
595823	2004 BE_{170}	—	February 24, 2009	Mount Lemmon	Mount Lemmon Survey	AGN	1.0 km	MPC · JPL
595824	2004 BY_{170}	—	February 8, 2008	Kitt Peak	Spacewatch	·	1.1 km	MPC · JPL
595825	2004 BE_{171}	—	April 25, 2012	Kitt Peak	Spacewatch	·	970 m	MPC · JPL
595826	2004 CC_{21}	—	February 11, 2004	Palomar	NEAT	ERI	1.5 km	MPC · JPL
595827	2004 CT_{50}	—	January 30, 2004	Kitt Peak	Spacewatch	·	990 m	MPC · JPL
595828	2004 CZ_{81}	—	February 12, 2004	Kitt Peak	Spacewatch	·	1.7 km	MPC · JPL
595829	2004 CD_{94}	—	February 11, 2004	Palomar	NEAT	·	1.2 km	MPC · JPL
595830	2004 CQ_{124}	—	February 12, 2004	Kitt Peak	Spacewatch	PHO	760 m	MPC · JPL
595831	2004 CO_{135}	—	August 17, 2016	Haleakala	Pan-STARRS 1	·	2.0 km	MPC · JPL
595832	2004 DG_{55}	—	February 12, 2004	Kitt Peak	Spacewatch	·	1.8 km	MPC · JPL
595833	2004 DS_{55}	—	February 22, 2004	Kitt Peak	Spacewatch	V	530 m	MPC · JPL
595834	2004 DE_{70}	—	February 26, 2004	Kitt Peak	Deep Ecliptic Survey	·	1.4 km	MPC · JPL
595835	2004 DL_{72}	—	February 16, 2004	Kitt Peak	Spacewatch	·	2.3 km	MPC · JPL
595836	2004 DF_{81}	—	October 18, 2007	Kitt Peak	Spacewatch	·	1.6 km	MPC · JPL
595837	2004 DU_{81}	—	February 26, 2004	Kitt Peak	Deep Ecliptic Survey	BRA	1.1 km	MPC · JPL
595838	2004 DS_{83}	—	February 20, 2009	Kitt Peak	Spacewatch	·	1.5 km	MPC · JPL
595839	2004 DL_{84}	—	May 4, 2014	Haleakala	Pan-STARRS 1	·	1.5 km	MPC · JPL
595840	2004 DA_{85}	—	July 2, 2011	Siding Spring	SSS	·	2.7 km	MPC · JPL
595841	2004 DE_{85}	—	June 10, 2010	Catalina	CSS	·	2.3 km	MPC · JPL
595842	2004 DR_{85}	—	February 15, 2012	Haleakala	Pan-STARRS 1	·	1.2 km	MPC · JPL
595843	2004 DY_{85}	—	April 13, 2008	Kitt Peak	Spacewatch	·	770 m	MPC · JPL
595844	2004 DZ_{85}	—	November 13, 2010	Mount Lemmon	Mount Lemmon Survey	·	980 m	MPC · JPL
595845	2004 EB_{44}	—	March 13, 2004	Palomar	NEAT	NYS	1.2 km	MPC · JPL
595846	2004 EV_{44}	—	March 15, 2004	Kitt Peak	Spacewatch	·	1.3 km	MPC · JPL
595847	2004 EX_{99}	—	March 15, 2004	Kitt Peak	Spacewatch	·	1.5 km	MPC · JPL
595848	2004 EC_{110}	—	March 15, 2004	Kitt Peak	Spacewatch	EOS	2.3 km	MPC · JPL
595849	2004 EK_{116}	—	January 13, 2011	Kitt Peak	Spacewatch	·	750 m	MPC · JPL
595850	2004 EM_{116}	—	February 25, 2014	Haleakala	Pan-STARRS 1	·	1.3 km	MPC · JPL
595851	2004 EN_{116}	—	March 15, 2004	Kitt Peak	Spacewatch	KOR	1.3 km	MPC · JPL
595852	2004 EQ_{116}	—	March 15, 2004	Kitt Peak	Spacewatch	·	730 m	MPC · JPL
595853	2004 EV_{117}	—	December 21, 2012	Mount Lemmon	Mount Lemmon Survey	·	1.5 km	MPC · JPL
595854	2004 FD_{5}	—	March 22, 2004	Nogales	P. R. Holvorcem, M. Schwartz	H	710 m	MPC · JPL
595855	2004 FB_{7}	—	March 16, 2004	Kitt Peak	Spacewatch	KOR	1.3 km	MPC · JPL
595856	2004 FW_{7}	—	March 16, 2004	Kitt Peak	Spacewatch	·	2.2 km	MPC · JPL
595857	2004 FL_{70}	—	March 17, 2004	Valmeca	C. Demeautis, Matter, D.	·	1.3 km	MPC · JPL
595858	2004 FE_{71}	—	March 17, 2004	Kitt Peak	Spacewatch	KOR	1.4 km	MPC · JPL
595859	2004 FU_{73}	—	March 17, 2004	Kitt Peak	Spacewatch	·	1.2 km	MPC · JPL
595860	2004 FP_{74}	—	March 17, 2004	Kitt Peak	Spacewatch	·	450 m	MPC · JPL
595861	2004 FL_{76}	—	March 18, 2004	Kitt Peak	Spacewatch	KOR	1.1 km	MPC · JPL
595862	2004 FQ_{113}	—	March 21, 2004	Kitt Peak	Spacewatch	HYG	2.2 km	MPC · JPL
595863	2004 FP_{144}	—	March 29, 2004	Kitt Peak	Spacewatch	·	1.1 km	MPC · JPL
595864	2004 FB_{167}	—	December 4, 2007	Kitt Peak	Spacewatch	·	2.3 km	MPC · JPL
595865	2004 FM_{167}	—	March 20, 2004	Kitt Peak	Spacewatch	NYS	1.0 km	MPC · JPL
595866	2004 FV_{169}	—	September 7, 2015	Catalina	CSS	H	390 m	MPC · JPL
595867	2004 FZ_{169}	—	March 27, 2004	Kitt Peak	Spacewatch	·	730 m	MPC · JPL
595868	2004 FW_{170}	—	February 13, 2007	Mount Lemmon	Mount Lemmon Survey	·	540 m	MPC · JPL
595869	2004 FL_{171}	—	May 3, 2008	Mount Lemmon	Mount Lemmon Survey	V	490 m	MPC · JPL
595870	2004 FN_{171}	—	March 21, 2015	Mount Lemmon	Mount Lemmon Survey	·	2.9 km	MPC · JPL
595871	2004 FV_{173}	—	March 19, 2012	Ka-Dar	Gerke, V.	3:2	3.2 km	MPC · JPL
595872	2004 FH_{174}	—	October 28, 2017	Haleakala	Pan-STARRS 1	·	1.5 km	MPC · JPL
595873	2004 FZ_{174}	—	July 25, 2017	Haleakala	Pan-STARRS 1	·	2.3 km	MPC · JPL
595874	2004 GD_{11}	—	April 12, 2004	Siding Spring	SSS	·	2.5 km	MPC · JPL
595875	2004 GM_{44}	—	April 12, 2004	Kitt Peak	Spacewatch	·	1.4 km	MPC · JPL
595876	2004 GP_{47}	—	April 12, 2004	Kitt Peak	Spacewatch	·	2.2 km	MPC · JPL
595877	2004 GR_{61}	—	April 13, 2004	Kitt Peak	Spacewatch	·	520 m	MPC · JPL
595878	2004 GK_{85}	—	April 14, 2004	Kitt Peak	Spacewatch	L4 · ERY	9.1 km	MPC · JPL
595879	2004 GP_{91}	—	November 12, 2007	Mount Lemmon	Mount Lemmon Survey	·	2.1 km	MPC · JPL
595880	2004 GX_{91}	—	April 12, 2004	Kitt Peak	Spacewatch	·	560 m	MPC · JPL
595881	2004 GG_{92}	—	April 14, 2004	Kitt Peak	Spacewatch	·	1.2 km	MPC · JPL
595882	2004 HX_{39}	—	April 19, 2004	Kitt Peak	Spacewatch	·	2.0 km	MPC · JPL
595883	2004 HK_{80}	—	October 29, 2005	Kitt Peak	Spacewatch	·	1.4 km	MPC · JPL
595884	2004 HM_{81}	—	September 22, 2008	Kitt Peak	Spacewatch	·	630 m	MPC · JPL
595885	2004 HV_{82}	—	May 8, 2008	Mount Lemmon	Mount Lemmon Survey	·	1.1 km	MPC · JPL
595886	2004 HW_{82}	—	August 13, 2012	Haleakala	Pan-STARRS 1	·	870 m	MPC · JPL
595887	2004 HC_{83}	—	April 9, 2008	Kitt Peak	Spacewatch	MAS	640 m	MPC · JPL
595888	2004 HC_{84}	—	September 3, 2008	Kitt Peak	Spacewatch	·	480 m	MPC · JPL
595889	2004 HY_{84}	—	March 21, 2009	Mount Lemmon	Mount Lemmon Survey	·	1.3 km	MPC · JPL
595890	2004 JP	—	May 9, 2004	Kitt Peak	Spacewatch	H	440 m	MPC · JPL
595891	2004 JS_{45}	—	March 16, 2004	Kitt Peak	Spacewatch	·	1.9 km	MPC · JPL
595892	2004 JY_{48}	—	May 13, 2004	Kitt Peak	Spacewatch	·	2.4 km	MPC · JPL
595893	2004 JU_{56}	—	October 1, 2009	Mount Lemmon	Mount Lemmon Survey	·	1.4 km	MPC · JPL
595894	2004 JB_{58}	—	February 28, 2014	Haleakala	Pan-STARRS 1	L4	6.8 km	MPC · JPL
595895	2004 KQ_{7}	—	May 20, 2004	Kitt Peak	Spacewatch	·	3.2 km	MPC · JPL
595896	2004 KS_{19}	—	May 23, 2004	Kitt Peak	Spacewatch	·	900 m	MPC · JPL
595897	2004 KW_{19}	—	April 17, 2012	Catalina	CSS	H	650 m	MPC · JPL
595898	2004 KV_{20}	—	May 7, 2014	Haleakala	Pan-STARRS 1	·	2.0 km	MPC · JPL
595899	2004 KO_{21}	—	July 19, 2015	Haleakala	Pan-STARRS 1	H	410 m	MPC · JPL
595900	2004 KU_{21}	—	August 31, 2005	Kitt Peak	Spacewatch	·	1.6 km	MPC · JPL

== 595901–596000 ==
back to top

Designation			Discovery			Properties		Ref
Permanent	Provisional	Named after	Date	Site	Discoverer(s)	Category	Diam.	Ref
595901 Lilybeaurepaire	2004 MG_{5}	Lilybeaurepaire	June 23, 2004	Mauna Kea	Pittichová, J., Bedient, J.	L4	7.8 km	MPC · JPL
595902	2004 MB_{9}	—	May 27, 2008	Mount Lemmon	Mount Lemmon Survey	·	1.4 km	MPC · JPL
595903	2004 MC_{10}	—	May 26, 2014	Haleakala	Pan-STARRS 1	EOS	1.6 km	MPC · JPL
595904	2004 NA_{30}	—	July 14, 2004	Socorro	LINEAR	H	470 m	MPC · JPL
595905	2004 OV_{15}	—	September 18, 2010	Mount Lemmon	Mount Lemmon Survey	EOS	1.5 km	MPC · JPL
595906	2004 PJ_{26}	—	August 8, 2004	Palomar	NEAT	·	1.7 km	MPC · JPL
595907	2004 PT_{44}	—	August 7, 2004	Palomar	NEAT	·	1.5 km	MPC · JPL
595908	2004 PD_{55}	—	August 8, 2004	Palomar	NEAT	·	2.6 km	MPC · JPL
595909	2004 PE_{67}	—	August 12, 2004	Socorro	LINEAR	·	1.4 km	MPC · JPL
595910	2004 PB_{70}	—	August 7, 2004	Palomar	NEAT	H	620 m	MPC · JPL
595911	2004 PK_{78}	—	August 9, 2004	Socorro	LINEAR	·	1.1 km	MPC · JPL
595912	2004 PC_{87}	—	August 11, 2004	Socorro	LINEAR	·	990 m	MPC · JPL
595913	2004 PN_{97}	—	August 15, 2004	Pla D'Arguines	R. Ferrando	·	1.1 km	MPC · JPL
595914	2004 PO_{105}	—	August 13, 2004	Palomar	NEAT	·	3.8 km	MPC · JPL
595915	2004 PO_{111}	—	August 10, 2004	Palomar	NEAT	·	3.4 km	MPC · JPL
595916	2004 PZ_{114}	—	August 20, 2004	Kitt Peak	Spacewatch	·	1.9 km	MPC · JPL
595917	2004 PR_{115}	—	August 20, 2004	Kitt Peak	Spacewatch	EOS	1.9 km	MPC · JPL
595918	2004 PQ_{118}	—	March 13, 2007	Kitt Peak	Spacewatch	·	920 m	MPC · JPL
595919	2004 PX_{120}	—	May 22, 2014	Mount Lemmon	Mount Lemmon Survey	·	2.0 km	MPC · JPL
595920	2004 QR_{15}	—	August 23, 2004	Kitt Peak	Spacewatch	·	1.7 km	MPC · JPL
595921	2004 QT_{15}	—	August 23, 2004	Kitt Peak	Spacewatch	·	2.4 km	MPC · JPL
595922	2004 QQ_{16}	—	August 21, 2004	Mauna Kea	D. D. Balam	·	1.1 km	MPC · JPL
595923	2004 QP_{29}	—	July 30, 2008	Kitt Peak	Spacewatch	NYS	1.2 km	MPC · JPL
595924	2004 QQ_{29}	—	July 29, 2008	Kitt Peak	Spacewatch	·	960 m	MPC · JPL
595925	2004 QY_{29}	—	April 9, 2015	Mount Lemmon	Mount Lemmon Survey	·	1.1 km	MPC · JPL
595926	2004 QQ_{30}	—	August 22, 2004	Kitt Peak	Spacewatch	·	950 m	MPC · JPL
595927	2004 QC_{31}	—	July 12, 2010	WISE	WISE	·	2.7 km	MPC · JPL
595928	2004 QN_{33}	—	September 10, 2015	Haleakala	Pan-STARRS 1	·	2.2 km	MPC · JPL
595929	2004 QM_{35}	—	October 14, 2010	Mount Lemmon	Mount Lemmon Survey	THM	1.8 km	MPC · JPL
595930	2004 QB_{36}	—	October 23, 2011	Mount Lemmon	Mount Lemmon Survey	·	550 m	MPC · JPL
595931	2004 QR_{37}	—	August 22, 2004	Kitt Peak	Spacewatch	·	830 m	MPC · JPL
595932	2004 RO_{9}	—	September 7, 2004	Palomar	NEAT	·	2.2 km	MPC · JPL
595933	2004 RB_{20}	—	August 15, 2004	Palomar	NEAT	·	1.8 km	MPC · JPL
595934	2004 RY_{23}	—	August 7, 2004	Palomar	NEAT	H	610 m	MPC · JPL
595935	2004 RQ_{26}	—	September 6, 2004	Siding Spring	SSS	·	540 m	MPC · JPL
595936	2004 RT_{26}	—	August 12, 2004	Campo Imperatore	CINEOS	·	2.4 km	MPC · JPL
595937	2004 RK_{52}	—	September 8, 2004	Socorro	LINEAR	·	590 m	MPC · JPL
595938	2004 RM_{52}	—	September 8, 2004	Socorro	LINEAR	·	2.3 km	MPC · JPL
595939	2004 RJ_{70}	—	September 8, 2004	Socorro	LINEAR	·	780 m	MPC · JPL
595940	2004 RK_{92}	—	September 8, 2004	Socorro	LINEAR	·	1.8 km	MPC · JPL
595941	2004 RK_{114}	—	September 7, 2004	Kitt Peak	Spacewatch	·	2.0 km	MPC · JPL
595942	2004 RN_{115}	—	August 25, 2004	Kitt Peak	Spacewatch	·	2.5 km	MPC · JPL
595943	2004 RJ_{117}	—	September 8, 1996	Kitt Peak	Spacewatch	·	1.1 km	MPC · JPL
595944	2004 RM_{122}	—	September 7, 2004	Kitt Peak	Spacewatch	AEG	2.2 km	MPC · JPL
595945	2004 RJ_{126}	—	September 7, 2004	Kitt Peak	Spacewatch	·	2.4 km	MPC · JPL
595946	2004 RS_{132}	—	September 7, 2004	Kitt Peak	Spacewatch	·	1.0 km	MPC · JPL
595947	2004 RN_{133}	—	February 12, 2011	Mount Lemmon	Mount Lemmon Survey	·	1.4 km	MPC · JPL
595948	2004 RU_{133}	—	September 7, 2004	Kitt Peak	Spacewatch	ARM	2.4 km	MPC · JPL
595949	2004 RJ_{143}	—	August 11, 2004	Palomar	NEAT	·	3.3 km	MPC · JPL
595950	2004 RE_{144}	—	August 15, 2004	Siding Spring	SSS	·	2.5 km	MPC · JPL
595951	2004 RH_{144}	—	September 8, 2004	Palomar	NEAT	·	790 m	MPC · JPL
595952	2004 RP_{144}	—	September 8, 2004	Kleť	M. Tichý	·	1.4 km	MPC · JPL
595953	2004 RV_{189}	—	August 16, 2004	Palomar	NEAT	·	980 m	MPC · JPL
595954	2004 RU_{196}	—	July 15, 2004	Socorro	LINEAR	·	660 m	MPC · JPL
595955	2004 RH_{219}	—	September 11, 2004	Socorro	LINEAR	EUN	1.1 km	MPC · JPL
595956	2004 RP_{221}	—	August 10, 2004	Palomar	NEAT	·	4.0 km	MPC · JPL
595957	2004 RU_{239}	—	September 10, 2004	Kitt Peak	Spacewatch	·	2.5 km	MPC · JPL
595958	2004 RN_{259}	—	September 10, 2004	Kitt Peak	Spacewatch	·	570 m	MPC · JPL
595959	2004 RA_{261}	—	September 10, 2004	Kitt Peak	Spacewatch	·	470 m	MPC · JPL
595960	2004 RL_{264}	—	September 10, 2004	Kitt Peak	Spacewatch	·	1.3 km	MPC · JPL
595961	2004 RM_{264}	—	September 10, 2004	Kitt Peak	Spacewatch	·	2.1 km	MPC · JPL
595962	2004 RN_{266}	—	September 11, 2004	Kitt Peak	Spacewatch	·	2.0 km	MPC · JPL
595963	2004 RH_{284}	—	July 17, 2004	Cerro Tololo	Deep Ecliptic Survey	·	1.2 km	MPC · JPL
595964	2004 RK_{284}	—	September 15, 2004	Kitt Peak	Spacewatch	·	2.7 km	MPC · JPL
595965	2004 RT_{298}	—	September 11, 2004	Kitt Peak	Spacewatch	·	2.7 km	MPC · JPL
595966	2004 RY_{299}	—	September 11, 2004	Kitt Peak	Spacewatch	·	2.3 km	MPC · JPL
595967	2004 RQ_{312}	—	August 7, 2004	Palomar	NEAT	·	1.4 km	MPC · JPL
595968	2004 RV_{313}	—	September 15, 2004	Kitt Peak	Spacewatch	·	1.1 km	MPC · JPL
595969	2004 RH_{332}	—	September 14, 2004	Palomar	NEAT	·	1.4 km	MPC · JPL
595970	2004 RJ_{357}	—	November 22, 2006	Kitt Peak	Spacewatch	3:2	6.7 km	MPC · JPL
595971	2004 RK_{357}	—	September 8, 2004	Socorro	LINEAR	·	3.3 km	MPC · JPL
595972	2004 RB_{358}	—	September 17, 2012	Nogales	M. Schwartz, P. R. Holvorcem	·	1.2 km	MPC · JPL
595973	2004 RN_{359}	—	April 14, 2008	Mount Lemmon	Mount Lemmon Survey	·	2.5 km	MPC · JPL
595974	2004 RY_{360}	—	September 28, 2008	Mount Lemmon	Mount Lemmon Survey	EUN	930 m	MPC · JPL
595975	2004 RP_{361}	—	April 15, 2008	Mount Lemmon	Mount Lemmon Survey	·	2.1 km	MPC · JPL
595976	2004 RQ_{361}	—	April 15, 2008	Mount Lemmon	Mount Lemmon Survey	·	2.8 km	MPC · JPL
595977	2004 RT_{361}	—	December 24, 2017	Haleakala	Pan-STARRS 1	·	2.4 km	MPC · JPL
595978	2004 RA_{364}	—	February 12, 2012	Mount Lemmon	Mount Lemmon Survey	EOS	1.9 km	MPC · JPL
595979	2004 RH_{365}	—	September 10, 2004	Kitt Peak	Spacewatch	EUN	700 m	MPC · JPL
595980	2004 RN_{366}	—	September 7, 2004	Kitt Peak	Spacewatch	·	820 m	MPC · JPL
595981	2004 ST_{6}	—	September 26, 2000	Kitt Peak	Spacewatch	EUN	830 m	MPC · JPL
595982	2004 SB_{44}	—	September 10, 2004	Socorro	LINEAR	·	560 m	MPC · JPL
595983	2004 SL_{49}	—	September 21, 2004	Socorro	LINEAR	·	1.8 km	MPC · JPL
595984	2004 ST_{62}	—	August 7, 2015	Haleakala	Pan-STARRS 1	H	470 m	MPC · JPL
595985	2004 SW_{62}	—	January 19, 2012	Haleakala	Pan-STARRS 1	·	2.4 km	MPC · JPL
595986	2004 SZ_{62}	—	April 15, 2007	Kitt Peak	Spacewatch	NYS	950 m	MPC · JPL
595987	2004 SO_{63}	—	August 20, 2008	Kitt Peak	Spacewatch	·	1.0 km	MPC · JPL
595988	2004 SK_{64}	—	September 23, 2015	Haleakala	Pan-STARRS 1	·	2.2 km	MPC · JPL
595989	2004 TD_{1}	—	October 5, 2004	Three Buttes	Jones, G. R.	·	570 m	MPC · JPL
595990	2004 TR_{22}	—	October 4, 2004	Kitt Peak	Spacewatch	·	2.1 km	MPC · JPL
595991	2004 TX_{29}	—	October 4, 2004	Kitt Peak	Spacewatch	EOS	1.4 km	MPC · JPL
595992	2004 TF_{39}	—	October 4, 2004	Kitt Peak	Spacewatch	·	1.8 km	MPC · JPL
595993	2004 TY_{39}	—	October 4, 2004	Kitt Peak	Spacewatch	·	1.8 km	MPC · JPL
595994	2004 TM_{43}	—	October 4, 2004	Kitt Peak	Spacewatch	VER	3.1 km	MPC · JPL
595995	2004 TX_{84}	—	October 5, 2004	Kitt Peak	Spacewatch	·	2.7 km	MPC · JPL
595996	2004 TF_{116}	—	October 4, 2004	Apache Point	SDSS Collaboration	·	1.3 km	MPC · JPL
595997	2004 TB_{141}	—	October 4, 2004	Kitt Peak	Spacewatch	·	1.1 km	MPC · JPL
595998	2004 TG_{153}	—	September 12, 2004	Kitt Peak	Spacewatch	·	2.4 km	MPC · JPL
595999	2004 TZ_{178}	—	October 7, 2004	Kitt Peak	Spacewatch	·	2.3 km	MPC · JPL
596000	2004 TU_{188}	—	September 23, 2004	Kitt Peak	Spacewatch	·	1.1 km	MPC · JPL

back to top

== Meaning of names ==
As minor planet discoveries are confirmed, they are given a permanent number by the IAU's Minor Planet Center (MPC), and the discoverers can then submit names for them, following the IAU's naming conventions. The list below concerns those minor planets in the specified number-range that have received names, and explains the meanings of those names.

Official naming citations of newly named small Solar System bodies are approved and published in a bulletin by IAU's Working Group for Small Bodies Nomenclature (WGSBN). Before May 2021, citations were published in MPC's Minor Planet Circulars for many decades. Recent citations can also be found on the JPL Small-Body Database (SBDB). Until his death in 2016, German astronomer Lutz D. Schmadel compiled these citations into the Dictionary of Minor Planet Names (DMP) and regularly updated the collection.

Based on Paul Herget's The Names of the Minor Planets, Schmadel also researched the unclear origin of numerous asteroids, most of which had been named prior to World War II. This article incorporates text from this source, which is in the public domain: SBDB New namings may only be added to this list below after official publication as the preannouncement of names is condemned. The WGSBN publishes a comprehensive guideline for the naming rules of non-cometary small Solar System bodies.

Named minor planet	Provisional	This minor planet was named for...	Ref · Catalog
595362 Schievink	2002 PC_{168}	Romke Schievink, Dutch multimedia professional and active meteor observer.	IAU · 595362
595480 Luidens	2002 WP_{29}	Hans Luidens, Dutch amateur astronomer.	IAU · 595480
595583 Annabelkarun	2003 OR_{34}	Annabel K. S. Karunananth, daughter of Canadian astronomers Helen Kirk (National Research Council of Canada) and Karun Thanjavur (University of Victoria). The parents are close friends of the first discoverer.	IAU · 595583
595590 Raphaelroose	2003 QG_{104}	Raphael Roose, grandson of the discoverer.	IAU · 595590
595901 Lilybeaurepaire	2004 MG_{5}	Lillian de Beaurepaire, Australian Olympic swimmer and diver. She competed in the 1920 Olympics at Antwerp.	IAU · 595901
