= List of Irish film directors =

This is a list of notable Irish film directors.

== A ==
- Lenny Abrahamson
- Meiert Avis

== B ==
- Steve Barron
- John Boorman
- David Noel Bourke
- Stephen Bradley
- Kenneth Branagh
- Paddy Breathnach
- Herbert Brenon

== C ==
- David Caffrey
- Michael Feeney Callan
- Graham Cantwell
- John Carney
- Declan Cassidy
- Norman Cohen
- Tom Collins
- Joe Comerford
- Fintan Connolly
- Joel Conroy
- John Crowley
- Lee Cronin

== D ==
- Éamon de Buitléar
- Barry Dignam
- Ciaran Donnelly
- Paul Duane
- Eoin Duffy
- Martin Duffy

== F ==
- Jason Figgis
- Jonathan Figgis
- Ian Fitzgibbon
- Ciaran Foy

== G ==
- Terry George
- Douglas Gerrard
- Simon Gibney
- Alan Gilsenan
- Benjamin Glazer
- David Gleeson
- Domhnall Gleeson

== H ==
- Neasa Hardiman
- Margo Harkin
- Richard Harris
- Thomas Hefferon
- Conor Horgan
- Brian Desmond Hurst

== I ==
- Rex Ingram

== J ==
- Graham Jones
- Neil Jordan

== K ==
- Ivan Kavanagh
- Elaine Kinsella
- Eilis Kirwan

== L ==
- Maximilian Le Cain
- Peter Lennon
- Louis Lentin
- Gerard Lough
- Declan Lowney

== M ==
- Donald Macardle
- Darach Mac Con Iomaire
- Eoin Macken
- Ruán Magan
- Mark Mahon
- Enda McCallion
- Daragh McCarthy
- Kevin McClory
- John Michael McDonagh
- Martin McDonagh
- John McDonnell
- Mary McGuckian
- Conor McPherson
- Sophie Merry
- John Moore
- Tomm Moore
- Redmond Morris
- George Morrisson
- Brendan Muldowney
- Maeve Murphy
- Nick Vincent Murphy

== N ==
- Roy William Neill
- Neasa Ní Chianáin

== O ==
- Ciarán Ó Cofaigh
- Pat O'Connor
- Damien O'Donnell
- Michael O'Herlihy
- Sidney Olcott
- David OReilly
- Thaddeus O'Sullivan

== P ==
- Dermott Petty

== Q ==
- Bob Quinn

== R ==
- Mary Raftery
- Rouzbeh Rashidi
- Ruairí Robinson
- Nick Ryan
- Frank Rynne

== S ==
- Laoisa Sexton
- Jim Sheridan
- Kirsten Sheridan
- Gary Shore
- Jimmy Smallhorne
- Gerard Stembridge

== T ==
- William Desmond Taylor
- Stuart Townsend
- Montgomery Tully
- Nora Twomey
- Dave Tynan

== W ==
- Aisling Walsh
- Dearbhla Walsh
- Rick Whelan
- Juanita Wilson

== See also ==
- Cinema of Ireland
