= Niall McKay =

Irish writer, director and film curator

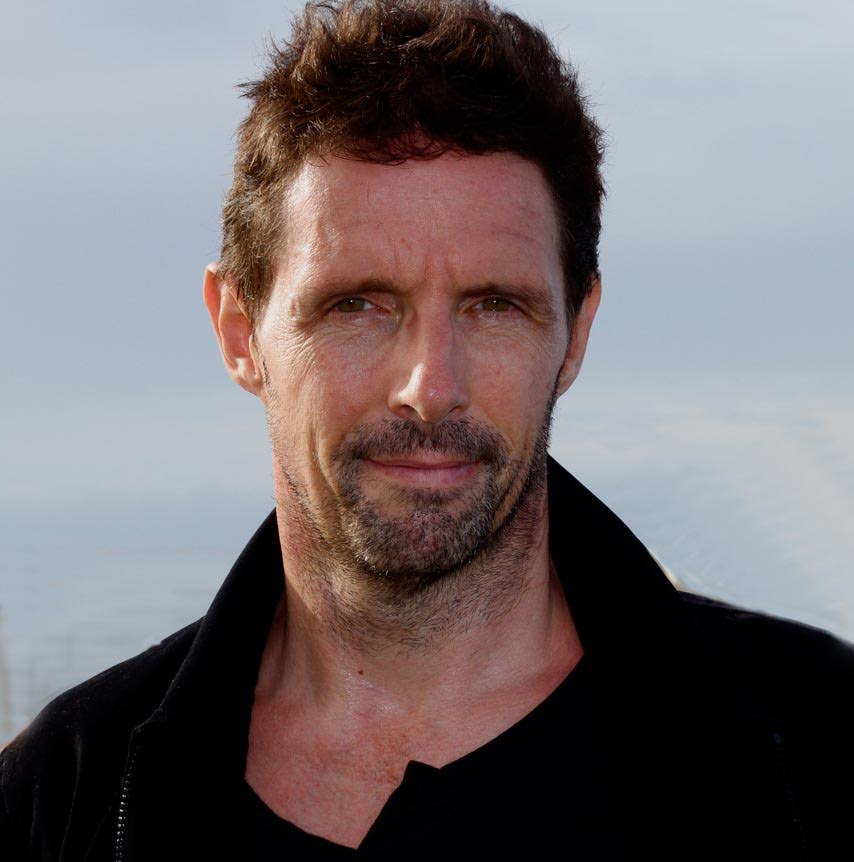

Niall McKay is an Irish writer, Emmy-winning director and film curator. He’s the writer/director of a New York based comedy series called On the Lig, a shorts programmer for the Tribeca Film Festival and curator of Irish Screen America, an Irish film festival held at USC in Los Angeles and NYU in New York. McKay is also co-founder of the production company Media Factory.

== Journalism ==
As a journalist, McKay's articles have appeared in The New York Times (notably, a story about the NSA spying on Europe), The Irish Times, Wired Magazine, and The Economist. His radio work has aired on NPR, BBC World Service, and RTÉ and he has also reported for PBS' Frontline World on the Northern Ireland peace process. He writes about film for Film Ireland Magazine.

== Filmmaking ==
McKay is writer and director of New York comedy series On the Lig, the writer and director of the 2009 Irish Film and Television Award nominated documentary, The Bass Player and is the writer and director of the Emmy-winning PBS documentary Sikhs in America.

McKay produced Irvine Welsh's first short film Nuts and also wrote and directed a short film called Recipe. McKay has just produced a historical documentary about the Filipino farmworkers for PBS called The Delano Manongs.

== Film Festivals ==
In 2011, McKay founded Irish Screen America (formerly known as Irish Film New York). Irish Screen America holds film festivals in Los Angeles and New York City. The mission behind Irish Screen America is to help Irish filmmakers build a community and gain more exposure within the United States. McKay is also co-founder of the San Francisco Irish Film Festival. He has been on the juries of the Cork Film Festival and the Galway Film Festival and the Student Academy Awards.

== Filmography ==
Director:

- 2020 - On the Lig (TV Movie)
- 2019 - The Ferry (Short)
- 2015 - On the Lig (TV Short)
- 2009 -The Bass Player (Documentary)
- 2008 - Sikhs in America (TV Movie documentary)

Cinematographer:

- 2015 - Ty Burnham: The Last Asian Cowboy (Short)
- 2014 - The Delano Manongs: Forgotten Heroes of the United Farm Workers (Documentary short)
