= Spears (film) =

2022 mystery/thriller film

- Directed by: Gerard Lough
- Screenplay by: Gerard Lough
- Produced by: Gerard Lough; Fatima Fleming
- Starring: Aidan O' Sullivan; Bobby Calloway; Nigel Brennan; Michael Parle; Yalda Shahidi; Rebecca Rose Flynn; Thomas Sharkey
- Cinematography: Gerard Lough
- Edited by: Greg Rouladh
- Music by: Sigrid Anita Haugen
- Release date: 18 February 2022 (Ireland)
- Running time: 125 minutes
- Country: Ireland
- Language: English

Spears is an Irish neo-noir thriller written and directed by Gerard Lough and starring Aidan O'Sullivan, Bobby Callaway, Nigel Brennan, Michael Parle, Yalda Shahidi, Rebecca Rose Flynn and Thomas Sharkey. The film was shot on location in four countries and was released on 18 February 2022.

The film is about three stories. In the first story, a private investigator in Florence is searching for a woman who disappeared. In London, a dissident republican does an arms deal with a new seller he does not trust. In Berlin, a scam artist spends a weekend with a married woman he tries to convince to leave with him. Each of the three men make a startling discovery which forces them to team up together in Ireland where they plot revenge on those who have wronged them.

== Pre-production ==
Eager to try a different genre after the horror/science fiction film Night People, Lough chose neo-noir with a story that would be inspired by various paranoid thrillers of the 1970s while updating it with modern-day technology and themes.

The film was inspired by Sorcerer in terms of its structure of introducing each of the main characters in a separate country before bringing them all together in the one country where the bulk of the action would take place.

This was intended to be rooted in the neo-noir genre with a "moody atmosphere and pervading sense of paranoia". The film's title is taken from the Emily Brontë quote: "Treachery and violence are spears pointed by both ends; they would those who resort to them worse than their enemies".

Speaking about the film's theme of revenge, Lough said: "I was keen to weave it into a story that would work as a cautionary tale that asks the audience that it may be natural to want to get your own back, but do two wrongs ever make a right? What's interesting is when the three protagonists decide to hit back at another group, the line between the good guys and bad guys becomes blurred very quickly and it's hard to tell them apart after a while. That's why I love the neo-noir genre; things are never simply black and white, moral ambiguity abounds... like real life."

In an article published after the film's completion, Lough reflected "What is it about neo-noir that attracts film directors like me? You could be uncharitable and just assume I’m a morbid bastard fixated on the dark side of human nature and a society where decency and fairness seem in short supply. It’s more that neo noir allows you to present a more realistic depiction of people and the world. A neat, happy ending that ties up all loose ends with a simple conclusion is also contrary to this genre and I for one like that. I’m the type that doesn’t want the conclusion of Cutter's Way spelled out for me."

== Production ==
Filming began in Donegal, Ireland where it made use of a high number of locations such as Slieve League, Meentycat wind farm and Leenan Fort. The production moved to Florence, Italy where it used locations such as the Duomo cathedral, Piazza della Signoria and Piazza Republica. In an interview with RTE, Lough remembered "I'd be lying if I said I didn't feel completely out of my depth on the first night in Florence, Italy. But I quickly pulled myself together when I remembered George Lucas felt the same way when he started shooting in Tunisia for the first time on the first Star Wars film. And I vividly remember that first night, when we first laid eyes on Piazza della Signoria – all lit up, just one of our filming locations. Despite the initial stress, we all knew this was going to be cool." In London, locations used included The Shard and Canary Wharf station. Finally, Berlin locations that were used included the Tiergartan, Kaiser Wilhelm Memorial Church and Sony Center. The final three days of principal photography were postposed by five months due to the COVID-19 outbreak.

== Marketing ==
A music video using footage from the film was made for the song Counterfeit by Le Groupe Fantastique and was released on 1 July 2019. The track also appears in the finished film.

The teaser poster was released exclusively on Flickering Myth on 20 September 2019 and paid homage to the teaser poster for Strange Days, a movie that inspired Lough to become a film-maker.

The main poster, designed by Chris Barnes, was released on 16 October 2020. A more traditional design, it featured the main characters and Florence locations.

The teaser trailer was released on 20 October 2020 as an exclusive on the RTE Entertainment website and featured the song Is This Ready? By Sleep Thieves and a title design that paid homage to opening titles of Alien. While it introduced audiences to the characters and focused on its many locations, it kept plot details under wraps.

The main trailer was released on 2 February 2022 and featured the song Rabbit with Hat by Exit: Pursued by a Bear. While it revealed more about the plot, it still kept the film's biggest plot twist hidden.

== Music ==
The following tracks appear in the film:

1. Pixelate by Shaefri

2. Rabbit with Hat by Exit: Pursued by a Bear

3. Counterfeit by Le Groupe Fantastique

4. Is This Ready? by Sleep Thieves

== Release ==
The film went on limited cinema release in Ireland on 18 February 2022, and VOD on 19 May.

In a review in Film Ireland, June Butler wrote "Lough has written and directed a film that this reviewer feels will become a cult classic." She praised the "powerful actors among the cast of Spears" and the music, "the superb soundtrack for Spears is one of many aspects in which this film becomes so watchable." Luke Maxwell from the Dublin InQuirer, thought its low budget worked in its favor, "Spears is constrained by a low budget. And in this way, Spears is grittier and realer than a lot of its flashier genre-mates." Recognizing the influence of David Mamet, Maxwell wrote "there is a commitment to similar “fun and games” that we see throughout Mamet’s filmography. Hidell’s Donegal movie scheme isn’t far off of something from House of Games or The Spanish Prisoner. It’s that kooky, “anything goes” energy that makes Spears something remarkable, flaws and all." Film Authority's Eddie Harrison also praised how the film handled its low budget; "for a micro-budget thriller, the game cast manage to make an earthy virtue out of a lo-fi aesthetic; Spears suggests a film-maker who is developing his own effective style for telling a tricky story."
