= Hefferon =

Hefferon is a surname. Notable people with the surname include:

- Charles Hefferon (1878–1931), South African long-distance runner
- Jim Hefferon (born 1958), American mathematician
- John A. Hefferon (born 1950), American physician
- Thomas Hefferon (born 1982), Irish film director
