= Gerard Lough =

Irish film director (born 1978)

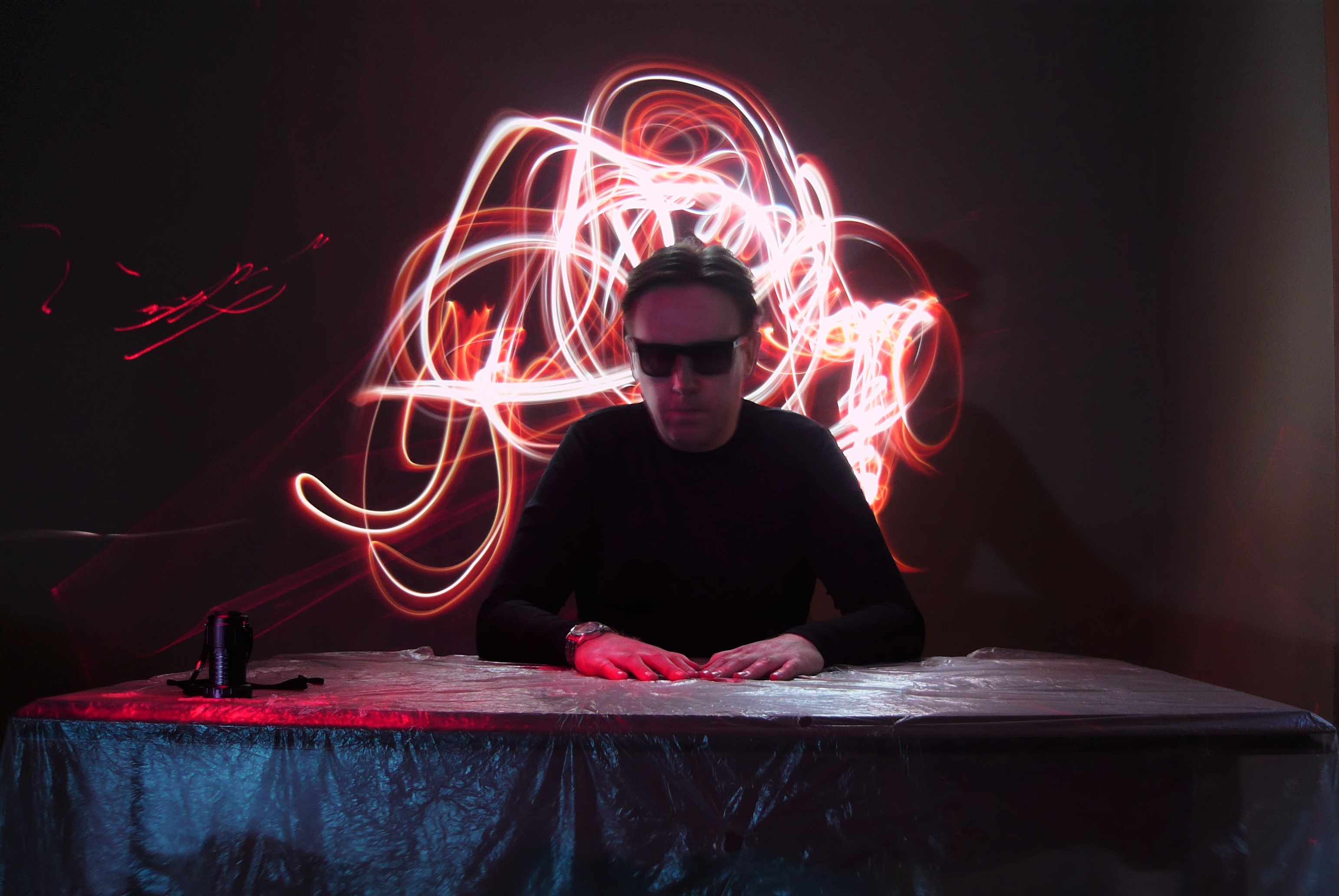
- Born: May 14, 1978 (age 48); Donegal, Ireland
- Occupations: Film director, film producer, music video director, screenwriter
- Years active: 2003–present

Gerard Lough is an Irish film director best known for Night People, Spears and the short film The Boogeyman, based on a story by Stephen King.

== Career ==
After graduating from the North West Institute in Derry, he took an internship in a U.S. advertising agency where he directed his first professional music video. Since then he has directed a dozen music videos as well as several short films such as the Stephen King adaption The Boogeyman which received extensive press coverage. His first feature film as director was Night People, was released in cinemas in November 2015. It was met with mostly positive reviews but a limited audience due to a short theatrical run. His second feature, a mystery / thriller called Spears, was released in 2022.

== Filmography ==
Feature Films

- 2022: Spears
- 2015: Night People

Short Films

- 2026: All She Wants Is
- 2024: Waiting for Magic Hour
- 2012: Ninety Seconds
- 2010: The Boogeyman
- 2009: The Stolen Wings
- 2009: The Scanner
- 2008: Deviant
- 2007: A Long Term Effect
- 2007: Ulterior

Music Videos

- 2019: Counterfeit, Le Groupe Fantastique
- 2017: It Feels So Good, Michael O'Boyce
- 2017: Warped, Electro Kill Machine
- 2016: Exoself, Voynich
- 2016: Rush of Blood, AustenEx
- 2015: Night People, Voynich
- 2008: Life In The Big City, Cian Furlong
- 2007: Baby Boom Boom, Cian Furlong
- 2006: I Lift My Hands, Lise and The Scarbrough Affair
- 2006: Karma & Destiny, The Scarbrough Affair
- 2005: The Divine Beat, Robbie Mc Donald
- 2005: Demon, First On
- 2003: Rachel Hates The Sun, Dan Anderson Band
