= Night People (2015 film) =

- Directed by: Gerard Lough
- Screenplay by: Gerard Lough
- Produced by: Gerard Lough; Tanya McLaughlin
- Starring: Michael Parle; Jack Dean-Shepherd; Claire Blennerhassett; Sarah Louise Carney; Aidan O' Sullivan; Eoin Leahy; Philip Doherty; Andrew Norry
- Cinematography: Greg Rouladh
- Edited by: Greg Rouladh
- Music by: Cian Furlong
- Release dates: 25 October 2015 (Horrorthon Film Festival); 13 November 2015 (Ireland)
- Running time: 108 minutes
- Country: Ireland
- Language: English

Night People is a 2015 Irish horror film written and directed by Gerard Lough and starring Michael Parle, Jack Dean-Shepherd and Claire Blennerhassett. The film had its premiere at the Horrorthon Film Festival at the Irish Film Institute on 25 October 2015 and was released in cinemas in Ireland on 13 November 2015. It is the feature film debut of director Gerard Lough. Although often described as an anthology film, it actually belongs to the sub genre of film known as Hyperlink due to its interwoven story lines.

== Premise ==
A pair of professional but badly mismatched criminals break into a vacant house to carry out an insurance scam. Awkwardly thrown together with an hour to pass, they reluctantly start telling each other tall tales. One concerns two friends who discover a mysterious device that may be of alien origin. The other is about an ambitious business woman who provides a dating agency for wealthy fetishists. She attempts to escape this shady line of work by taking on a new client whose habits may be of the vampiric variety. As the night progresses the line between fiction and reality starts to blur and the hidden agendas of both thieves become apparent.

== Production ==
=== Development ===
After finishing his promotional duties on the Sci-Fi short film Ninety Seconds, Lough decided it was now the right time to make his feature film debut. He was inspired by the "Horror / Sci-Fi anthology films of the '80s such as Creepshow, The Twilight Zone and Cat's Eye but with the goal of having each story blend together to make one big story and then bring it stylistically up to date for a modern audience." The screenplay went through close to a dozen drafts and the original idea of four interconnecting stories was eventually changed to three. Many of the same cast and crew he previously worked with on his short films returned for this film.

Other influences included the New Wave music scene of the early 80's and France's 'Cinema du Look' movement.

=== Production ===
Principal photography began in Co Donegal, Ireland on 1 August 2013 with a series of demanding night shoots. Because the film is divided up into three different stories, the unusual production had to be treated as three different films as each tale had a completely different cast, look, locations, etc., which necessitated a prep / shoot / post process that would repeat itself with each tale and take shooting well into 2014. The film started shooting on Canon HD cameras which Lough had worked with before on his short film Ninety Seconds and had found to be very sensitive to low light conditions and night shoots. The shoot took in many visually striking locations as diverse as Fanad Lighthouse, Barnesmore Gap and Grianan of Aileach but constantly ran into bad weather. As Lough joked in an interview, "All the rain in the movie is not me paying homage to Blade Runner – it's the real thing". The shoot moved to Dublin for two days to use locations such as The Marker Hotel. Principal photography ended on 23 August 2014.

=== Post Production ===
Over a six-month period, composer Cian Furlong created over an hour's worth of densely layered, completely electronic music. His score was made entirely on Mulab while also using orchestral samples such as brass and strings. The score included a new electronic version of The Flower Duet from the opera Lakme. Its inclusion was intended by Lough as a homage to director Tony Scott who used the same music in his feature debut The Hunger, a film that influenced Night People. Musically the rest of the film included seven different synthesizer tracks from various up and coming bands and artists such as Electro Kill Machine (who contributed two songs). All of the film's visual effects were produced solely by Paul Barrett.

The film received a '16' certificate from the Irish Film Censor Office for "Strong scenes of gory violence/torture" and "Strong sex references".

== Marketing ==
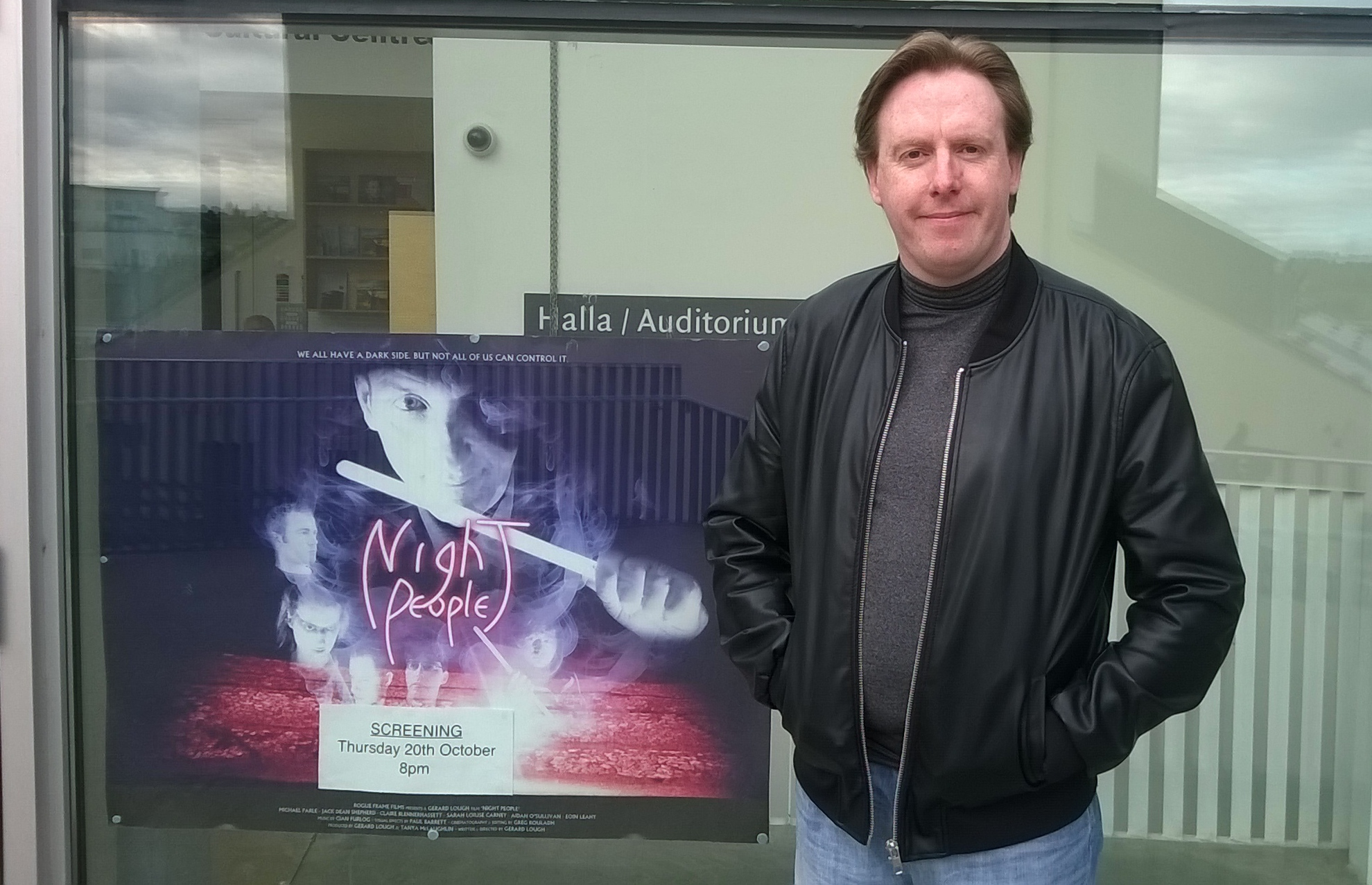
Director Gerard Lough at a screening for his film 'Night People'

The first of four teaser posters appeared on the Irish film website Scannain on 18 August 2014. A second poster made its debut on The Movie Bit on 28 August. The third teaser poster appeared on British film website Horror Cult Films soon after. The final teaser poster was released in May 2015.

The teaser trailer was released on 1 September 2014 and focused on a group of men uncovering a mysterious item buried in the grounds of Grianan of Aileach. It also introduced all the main characters and an explanation of the term "Night People" as depicted in the fictional world of the film. A slightly longer version of the teaser was screened at Dublin's Horrorthon Film Festival a month later.

On 9 February 2015 a music video for a single also called Night People by Voynich was released. It featured six of the cast members, was directed by Lough and was shot on location in Dublin and Donegal. The song was an E.D.M. track that sampled dialogue from the film.

Unable to come up with a strong ad line for the final poster, the film-makers ran a competition open to the public where the winning suggestion would be used. The final poster was released on 17 September 2015.

The trailer made its debut on Daily Dead on 26 August 2015.

== Connection to Ninety Seconds ==
Two characters from Lough's 2012 short film Ninety Seconds appear in the film. Mark, a cynical surveillance expert played by Andrew Norry and The Administrator, an office manager bully played by Geraldine Foy. Apart from some of the same locations being used again (Dublin's Convention Centre, Donegal's Letterkenny Cathedral) the short shares no other similarities with Night People.

== Music ==
The film's mainly synthesizer score was composed by Cian Furlong and was released on 15 November 2015. In addition to this the following tracks appear in the film.

1. "Warped" by Electro Kill Machine
2. "Skyline" by 1977
3. "Electric Blue" by Electro Kill Machine
4. "Moonlight" by Labstrakt
5. "Calling Me" by Voice Controller Kristi
6. "Talaimon" by Ciaran McCann
7. "The Key" (Lasso d'Amore Remix) by Riot Tapes
8. "The Flower Duet" by Leo Delibes (performed by Cian Furlong)
9. "Night People" by Voynich

Lough would go on to direct music videos for Night People and Warped.

== Release and reception ==
The film went on limited cinema release in Ireland on 13 November 2015.

David Prendeville in his review for Film Ireland hailed the film as one that "neither looks nor sounds like any other Irish film" and added that "This ambitious film is full of distinctive flavor" while singling out Michael Parle as the "real star of the show". As did Dan Woolstencroft in his review for Nerdly who thought "he has great charisma. It’s a bit of shame he isn’t given more to do..." and concluded "Clearly made on a low budget, that doesn’t dampen the enthusiasm and vision that Lough has pumped into the film." Andrew Thompson from Legless Corpse praised the film as one that "feels personal, intimate, and coldly spooky" and singled out Claire Blennerhassett's performance as a stand out as a "frustrated character, captured by her lifestyle yet so desperate to leave it that she would sell her soul." Tom Little of Mr Rumsey's Film Related Musings had mixed feelings, writing "Beautiful, haunting imagery and a few interesting ideas don’t quite coalesce to form a compelling whole in Night People." However, he concluded that "there’s no denying this is a film of ideas." Ed Fortune's review in Starburst Magazine also praised Blennerhassett's "great performance" and described the film as a "good indie horror anthology". Matt Boiselle predicted in his review for Dread Central that "this vehicle should only drive him (Lough) further into bigger and more memorable projects in the future..." and described the film as a "creative little anthology piece that manages to entertain as well as provide some genuine thrills from the performances within." Elliot Maguire's review in UK Horror Scene rated the film as "an ambitious, stylishly made little neon-lit horror, full of imagination and twists on conventions."

== Home media ==
The film was released on VOD on 9 May 2016.

== See also ==
- Hyperlink cinema
- List of Irish films
