= Sophie Merry =

Sophie Merry is a Dublin-based Irish YouTuber, filmmaker, dancer and part-time model. She is known for her "Groovy Dancing Girl" videos on her YouTube channel BandyToaster, has appeared in music videos, and has made short films.

== Videos ==
My friends call me the Irish Crazy Frog. I get the odd marriage proposal from 40-year-old American men. Online is a funny old place.

—Sophie Merry, August 2010

Sophie first came to attention on her YouTube channel, BandyToaster ("two random words stuck together"), with a video titled "Groovy Dancing Girl," featuring Merry dancing to "Harder, Better, Faster, Stronger" by Daft Punk. She danced to a slowed-down version of the song, then increased the speed of the footage to match the song played at normal speed (called undercranking). The video was shot in her friend's garden and posted in February 2007. She has since shot three more Groovy Dancing Girl videos. Her videos have received more than nine million hits. Her short film "Solo Duet" was funded by the Irish Film Board and was shown in October 2009 at the Darklight Film Festival, a digital film festival. In 2008 she appeared in a music video for Autoban's single "Sirens," and in 2009, she appeared in The Riptide Movement's video for their single "Cry Cry Baby." In October 2011, a live-action short subject which Merry made with Sigmedia and shot in stereoscopic 3D, titled Clockhead, premiered at Darklight. In 2015, she appeared as "the cloaked woman" in the titles sequence, and the pledge-break framing sequences, of PBS's transmission of the video presentation of the tie-in concert to Celtic Woman's album Destiny.

== Education and work ==
Merry received a BA hons. in Spanish and Sociology from University College Dublin in 2004 and a higher national diploma in computer and classical animation from Ballyfermot College of Further Education in 2007. Aged 16, Merry appeared on the cover of U Magazine after winning a competition. She is a life model, and did a photo shoot and viral video for the French company Etam in a jeans campaign launched in April 2008 that ran in 51 countries. She previously worked for Jam Media, and she has worked as a director for Jumper Productions in Dublin since the company launched in early 2010. She worked on a viral video campaign for the social networking site Whispurr in 2010, and produced an interactive installation for the Biorhythm exhibition at Trinity College Dublin's Science Gallery. In 2011, as mentioned above, Merry joined with Sigmedia to create Ireland's first short subject to be shot using a stereoscopic camera rig, Clockhead. It premiered at Darklight Film Festival and the Chicago Irish Film Festival.

Merry is fully trained in the Meisner Acting Technique and has also studied at the Gaiety School of Acting, The Abbey School and Bow Street Academy. More recently she was awarded Best Actor at the Limerick Film Festival 2016 and was part of Jasons Byrnes 'Inlands' show as part of Dublin Theatre Festival 2016.

== Personal life ==
Merry is from Shankill, Co. Dublin. She studied ballet and modern dance as a child. Her mother and father, Mary Reynolds and Brian Merry, are artists, and she has a brother and three sisters.
