= Elagh More =

Coordinates: 55.039°N 7.339°W

Elagh More: Irish: Aileach Mór
- Location within Northern Ireland
  - Belfast: 63 mi (101 km)
  - Dublin: 124 mi (200 km)
- District: Derry City and Strabane
- County: County Londonderry
- Country: Northern Ireland
- Sovereign state: United Kingdom
- Post town: LONDONDERRY
- Postcode district: BT48
- Dialling code: 028
- Police: Northern Ireland
- Fire: Northern Ireland
- Ambulance: Northern Ireland
- UK Parliament: Foyle
- NI Assembly: Foyle

Elagh More (from Irish: Aileach Mór, meaning 'stony place') is a townland in County Londonderry, Northern Ireland and lies between Ballynagalliagh and the border with County Donegal in the Republic of Ireland, on the outskirts of Derry. It is within Derry City and Strabane district.

Elagh More is referred to in Annals of the Four Masters as "tighearna Ailigh do mharbhadh la hUa mBreasail". In the Irish patent rolls of James I, the townland is referred to as Allaghderrie. Later in the century, the manor of Elagh was held by the Benson family, who also founded the town of Stranorlar in County Donegal.
