= Thomas Hefferon =

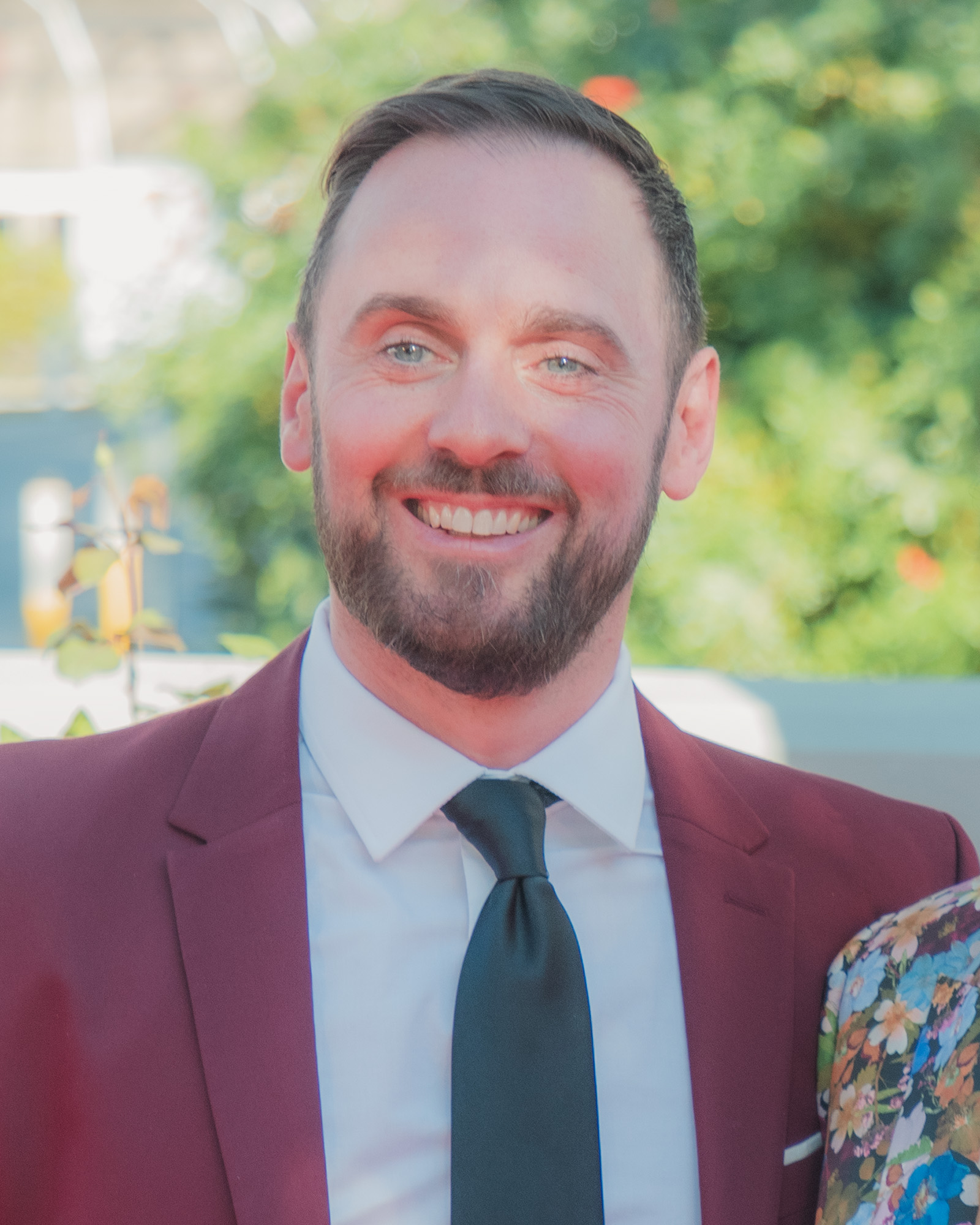
- Hefferon in 2026
- Born: January 3, 1982 (age 44); London, England
- Occupation: Filmmaker

Thomas Hefferon (born 3 January 1982) is an Irish filmmaker based between Los Angeles, London and Dublin, Ireland.

== Life and career ==
Hefferon moved from London to Dublin in 1989, at the age of 7. He finished school in 2000, and entered the Film Foundation Course run by Filmbase, in Temple Bar, Dublin. In 2003, he directed the short film Perfect Strangers.

Since 2004, he worked on a variety of film projects as a co-writer, producer and camera person. He also writes and develops his own scripts, the latest of which has been selected for state funding (see The Pool, below). In January 2009 he shot the music video for JJ Daly's Playing The Game. which was followed by the nationwide release of the single, also available on iTunes.

In 2005, he worked with Stephen Crilly and Kevin de la Isla, to create the wacky comedy Lesson 101: The Wacky Diary Of A Pickup Artist. The film received best Direction, best runner up, best Actor and best Actress at the 2005 New York Midnight Madness Film Festival.

In 2011, he had three of his films shown at the Tribeca Festival, New York, which were Switch (2011), The Heist (2011), and The Confession (2008).

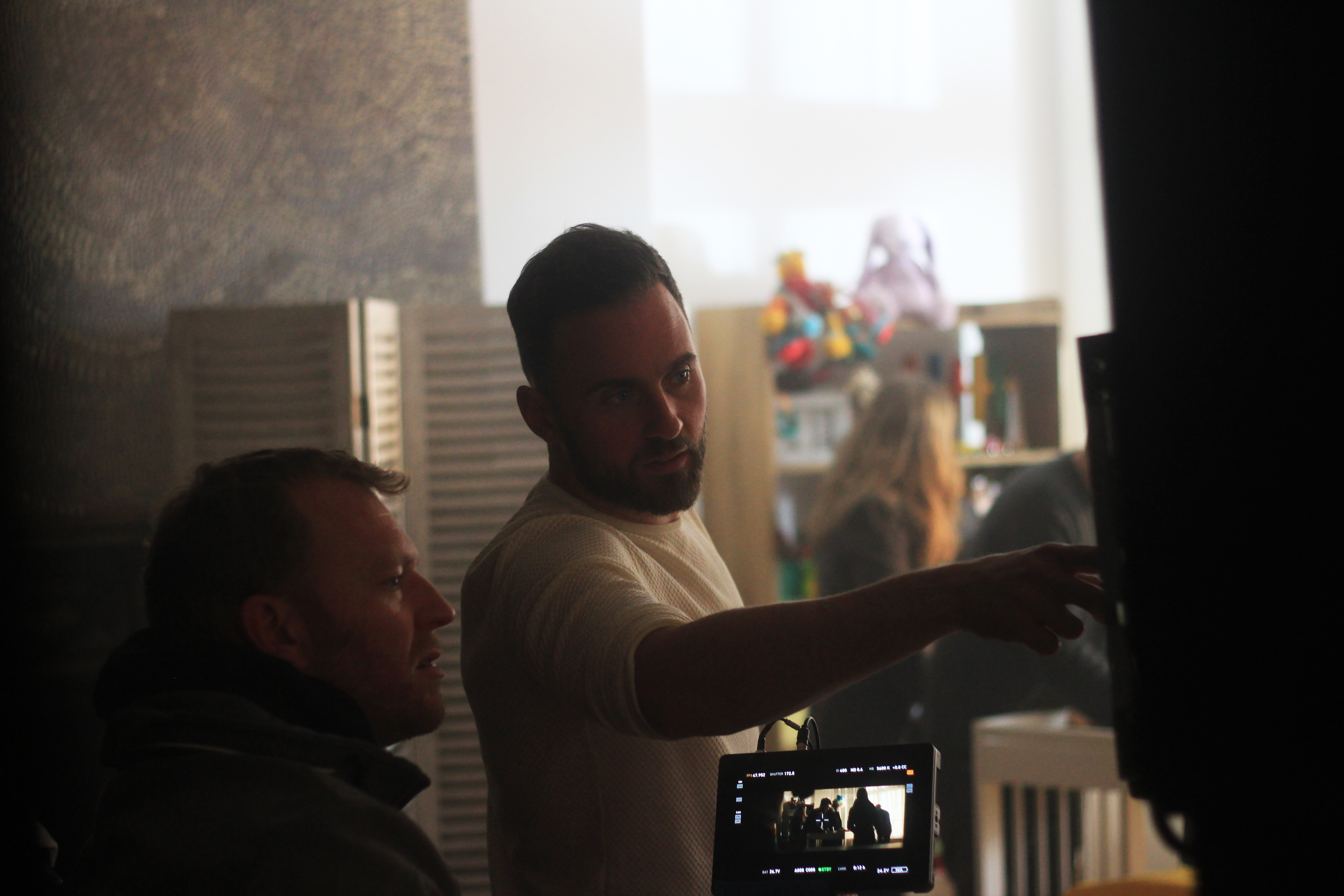
Thomas Hefferon Directing a TV commercial in 2018.

== Filmography ==
- The Confession (2008)
- The Pool (2010)
- Switch (2011)
- The Heist (2011)
- Falling Apart (2013)
