= Ninety Seconds =

- Directed by: Gerard Lough
- Screenplay by: Gerard Lough
- Produced by: Gerard Lough
- Starring: Andrew Norry; Michael Parle; Claire Blennerhassett; Simon Fogarty; Emma Eliza Regan
- Cinematography: Greg Rouladh
- Edited by: Greg Rouladh
- Music by: Cian Furlong
- Release date: 13 August 2012 (Ireland)
- Running time: 27 minutes
- Country: Ireland
- Language: English

Ninety Seconds is an Irish science fiction neo-noir short film directed by Gerard Lough and starring Andrew Norry, Michael Parle, Claire Blennerhassett and Emma Eliza Regan. It premiered at the Underground Cinema Film Festival in Dublin on 9 August 2012.

== Synopsis ==
The film is set in the near future where surveillance experts known as "Techs" take on morally dubious assignments for wealthy clients. Mark and his new assistant Ralfi are the best in their field. They quickly sense something is out of place when they are hired by shifty businessman Philips for an unusual assignment that will lead them into a world of paranoia, intrigue and revenge.

== Critical reception and release ==
Geeks of Doom reviewed the film, stating that they were "instantly intrigued by its darkness shot through with cool music, nifty graphics, and well-placed blindingly bright lights." The Irish Examiner also reviewed the short, citing its "superb soundtrack" as a highlight.

After screenings at several film festivals, the film was released online on 11 February 2013.
