= 1921 USA Outdoor Track and Field Championships =

American athletics championship event

- Dates: 3–5 July (men)
- Host city: Pasadena, California (men)
- Venue: Paddock Field (men)
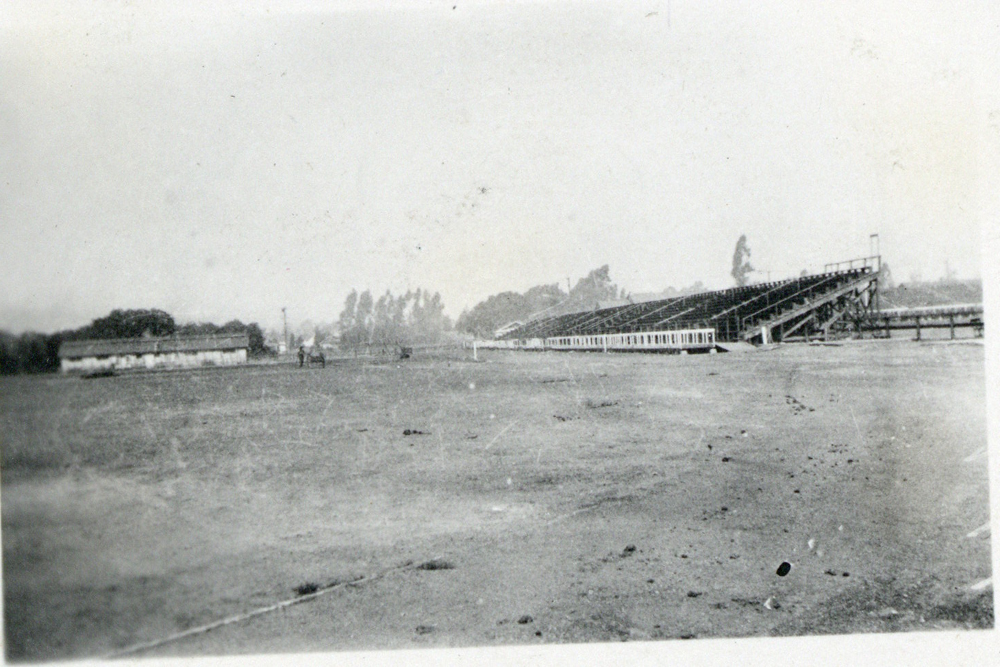

The 1921 USA Outdoor Track and Field Championships were organized by the Amateur Athletic Union (AAU) and served as the national championships in outdoor track and field for the United States.

The men's edition was held at Paddock Field in Pasadena, California, and it took place 3–5 July. The first women's championships were not held until 1923.

It was the first championships that relay races were held in addition to individual events. The relays were held on 5 July after the other disciplines the previous day.

== Results ==
Event	Gold		Silver		Bronze	
100 yards	Charles Paddock	9.6	Vernon Blenkiron		Edward Farrell	
220 yards straight	Charles Paddock	21.8	Morris Kirksey		William Hayes	
440 yards	William Stevenson	48.6	Jim Driscoll		George Schiller	
880 yards	Alan Helffrich	1:54.8	Larry Brown		Michael Devaney	
1 mile	Joseph Ray	4:16.8	James Connolly		Lawrence Shields	
5 miles	Earl Johnson	25:53.4	Mase Polingzowma		Bramwell French	
120 yards hurdles	Earl Thomson (CAN)	15.0	Christopher Krogness		William Yount	
440 yards hurdles (Note: Desch turned over a hurdle, which made his mark invalid for record purposes at the time.)	August Desch	53.4	John Norton		Colin Kilby	
2 miles steeplechase	Michael Devaney	11:34.0	Frank Titterton		Al Dolder	
High jump	Devey Alberts	1.93 m	John Murphy	1.93 m	Oliver Corey	1.90 m
Pole vault	Edward Knourek	3.85 m	Eldon Jenne	3.80 m	Percy Graham	3.77 m
Long jump	Edward Gourdin	7.21 m	Charles Cruikshank	6.87 m	John Argue	6.74 m
Triple jump	Kaufman Geist	14.10 m	Robert Kelley	14.04 m	Daniel Ahearn	13.77 m
Shot put	Clarence Houser	14.32 m	Patrick McDonald	14.13 m	Augustus Pope	13.87 m
Discus throw	Augustus Pope	43.89 m	William MacGurn	41.48 m	Glenn Hartranft	41.24 m
Hammer throw	Patrick James Ryan	52.00 m	James McEachern	50.99 m	Matthew McGrath	50.35 m
Javelin throw	Milton Angier	57.69 m	Flint Hanner	54.41 m	Brutus Hamilton	52.56 m
Decathlon	Dan Shea	5849.338 pts	Patrick O'Connor	5637.875 pts	Joseph Erbal	5571.897 pts
220 yards hurdles	Earl Thomson	24.6				
Pentathlon	Ned Gourdin	12 pts				
Weight throw for distance	Patrick McDonald	11.48 m				
All-around decathlon	Samuel Thomson	7532.5 pts				

== See also ==
- List of USA Outdoor Track and Field Championships winners (men)
- List of USA Outdoor Track and Field Championships winners (women)
