= Athletics at the 1920 Summer Olympics – Men's 400 metres hurdles =

Men's 400 metres hurdles at the Games of the VII Olympiad
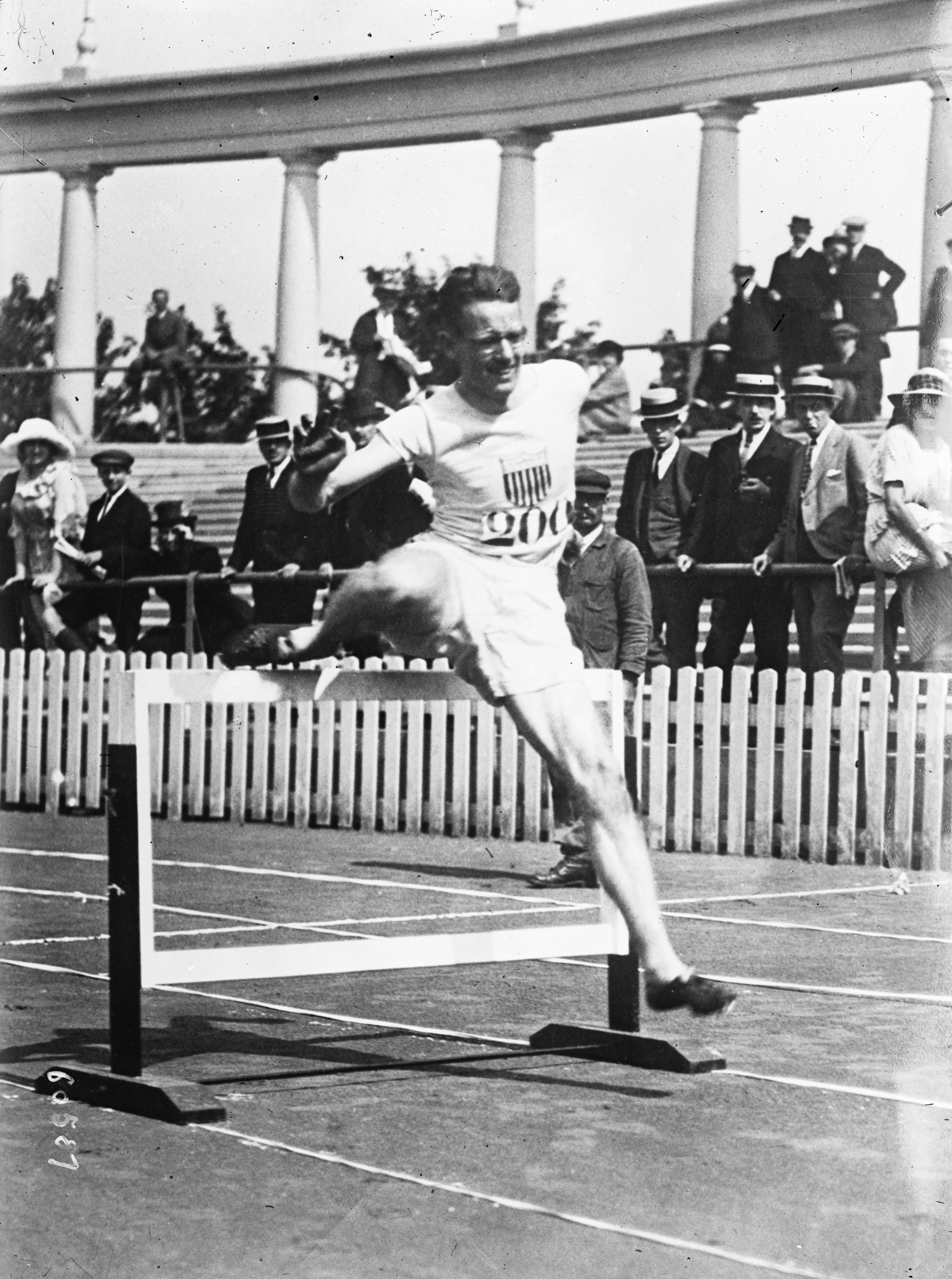
- Frank Loomis in the final
- Venue: Olympisch Stadion
- Dates: August 15–16, 1920
- Competitors: 19 from 9 nations
- Winning time: 54.0 WR

Medalists
1st place, gold medalist(s)		Frank Loomis; United States
2nd place, silver medalist(s)		John Norton; United States
3rd place, bronze medalist(s)		August Desch; United States

The men's 400 metres hurdles event was part of the track and field athletics programme at the 1920 Summer Olympics. The competition was held on Sunday, August 15, 1920, and on Monday, August 16, 1920. 19 runners from 9 nations competed. Nations were limited to 4 hurdlers each. The event was won by Frank Loomis of the United States, the fourth consecutive victory (in four appearances of the event) by an American. The United States secured its second sweep in the event, and first with other nations competing (only Americans had run in 1900), with John Norton taking silver and August Desch bronze.

== Background ==
This was the fourth time the event was held. It had been introduced along with the men's 200 metres hurdles in 1900, with the 200 being dropped after 1904 and the 400 being held through 1908 before being left off the 1912 programme. However, when the Olympics returned after World War I, the men's 400 metres hurdles was back and would continue to be contested at every Games thereafter.

There was no favorite in the event, which was not a common competition (and had not been held at the previous Games).

Australia, Belgium, Czechoslovakia, Finland, South Africa, and Sweden each made their debut in the event. The United States made its fourth appearance, the only nation to have competed at every edition of the event to that point.

== Competition format ==
As in 1908, the competition consisted of three rounds: quarterfinals, semifinals, and a final. Ten sets of hurdles were set on the course. The hurdles were 3 feet (91.5 centimetres) tall and were placed 35 metres apart beginning 45 metres from the starting line, resulting in a 40 metres home stretch after the last hurdle.

There were 5 quarterfinal heats, with between 2 and 5 athletes each. The top 2 men in each quarterfinal advanced to the semifinals. The 10 semifinalists were divided into 2 semifinals of 5 athletes each, with the top 3 in each semifinal advancing to the 6-man final.

== Records ==
These were the standing world and Olympic records (in seconds) prior to the 1920 Summer Olympics.

World record	John Norton (USA)	54.2	Pasadena, United States	26 June 1920
Olympic record	Charles Bacon (USA)	55.0	London, United Kingdom of Great Britain and Ireland	22 July 1908

Frank Loomis set a new world record with 54.0 seconds in the final.

== Schedule ==
Date	Time	Round
Sunday, 15 August 1920	11:30; 14:30	Quarterfinals; Semifinals
Monday, 16 August 1920	14:30	Final

== Results ==
=== Quarterfinals ===
==== Quarterfinal 1 ====
Rank	Athlete	Nation	Time	Notes
1	August Desch	United States	57.6	Q
2	Erik Wilén	Finland	58.4	Q
3	George Gray	Great Britain	58.8	
4	František Marek	Czechoslovakia	Unknown	

==== Quarterfinal 2 ====
Rank	Athlete	Nation	Time	Notes
1	Wilfrid Kent-Hughes	Australia	57.2	Q
2	Gösta Bladin	Sweden	57.7	Q
3	František Kiehlmann	Czechoslovakia	59.9	
—	Antoine Jarrety	France	DNF	
—	Attie van Heerden	South Africa	DNF	

==== Quarterfinal 3 ====
Rank	Athlete	Nation	Time	Notes
1	John Norton	United States	57.6	Q
2	Edward Wheller	Great Britain	58.4	Q
3	Georg Lindström	Sweden	59.1	
4	Albert Lucas	France	Unknown	

==== Quarterfinal 4 ====
Rank	Athlete	Nation	Time	Notes
1	Carl-Axel Christiernsson	Sweden	56.4	Q
2	Charles Daggs	United States	56.7	Q
3	Valdemar Wickholm	Finland	57.9	
—	Omer Smet	Belgium	DNF	

==== Quarterfinal 5 ====
Rank	Athlete	Nation	Time	Notes
1	Frank Loomis	United States	55.8	Q
2	Géo André	France	55.9	Q

=== Semifinals ===
==== Semifinal 1 ====
Rank	Athlete	Nation	Time	Notes
1	August Desch	United States	55.4	Q
2	Géo André	France	55.5	Q
3	John Norton	United States	56.2	Q
4	Gösta Bladin	Sweden	56.5	
5	Wilfrid Kent-Hughes	Australia	56.9	

==== Semifinal 2 ====
Rank	Athlete	Nation	Time	Notes
1	Frank Loomis	United States	55.4	Q
2	Carl-Axel Christiernsson	Sweden	55.7	Q
3	Charles Daggs	United States	55.8	Q
4	Edward Wheller	Great Britain	Unknown	
5	Erik Wilén	Finland	Unknown	

=== Final ===
The final was held on Monday, August 16, 1920.

Rank	Athlete	Nation	Time	Notes
1st place, gold medalist(s)	Frank Loomis	United States	54.0	WR
2nd place, silver medalist(s)	John Norton	United States	54.6	
3rd place, bronze medalist(s)	August Desch	United States	54.7	
4	Géo André	France	54.8	
5	Carl-Axel Christiernsson	Sweden	55.4	
6	Charles Daggs	United States	55.7	

== Results summary ==
Rank	Athlete	Nation	Quarterfinals	Semifinals	Final	Notes
1st place, gold medalist(s)	Frank Loomis	United States	55.8	55.4	54.0	WR
2nd place, silver medalist(s)	John Norton	United States	57.6	56.2	54.6	
3rd place, bronze medalist(s)	August Desch	United States	57.6	55.4	54.7	
4	Géo André	France	55.9	55.5	54.8	
5	Carl-Axel Christiernsson	Sweden	56.4	55.7	55.4	
6	Charles Daggs	United States	56.7	55.8	55.7	
7	Gösta Bladin	Sweden	57.7	56.5	Did not advance	
8	Wilfrid Kent-Hughes	Australia	57.2	56.9	Did not advance	
9	Edward Wheller	Great Britain	58.4	Unknown	Did not advance	4th in semifinal
10	Erik Wilén	Finland	58.4	Unknown	Did not advance	5th in semifinal
11	Valdemar Wickholm	Finland	57.9	Did not advance		
12	George Gray	Great Britain	58.8	Did not advance		
13	Georg Lindström	Sweden	59.1	Did not advance		
14	František Kiehlmann	Czechoslovakia	59.9	Did not advance		
15	Albert Lucas	France	Unknown	Did not advance		4th in quarterfinal
15	František Marek	Czechoslovakia	Unknown	Did not advance		4th in quarterfinal
17	Attie van Heerden	South Africa	DNF	Did not advance		
17	Antoine Jarrety	France	DNF	Did not advance		
17	Omer Smet	Belgium	DNF	Did not advance		
