= Albert Lucas =

Albert or Al Lucas may refer to:

- Al Lucas (American football) (1978–2005), professional American football player (NFL, AFL)
- Albert Lucas (athlete) (1899–1967), French hurdler
- Al Lucas (basketball) (1922–1995), professional basketball player who played one season for the Boston Celtics
- Al Lucas (musician) (1916–1983), Canadian jazz bassist and studio musician
- Albert Lucas (Jewish activist) (1859–1923), British-born American activist in global charity and Orthodox Judaism
- Albert Lucas (juggler) (born 1960), American juggler who has set several world records
- Albert Pike Lucas (1862–1945), American painter and sculptor
