= Athletics at the 1920 Summer Olympics – Men's 110 metres hurdles =

Men's 110 metres hurdles at the Games of the VII Olympiad
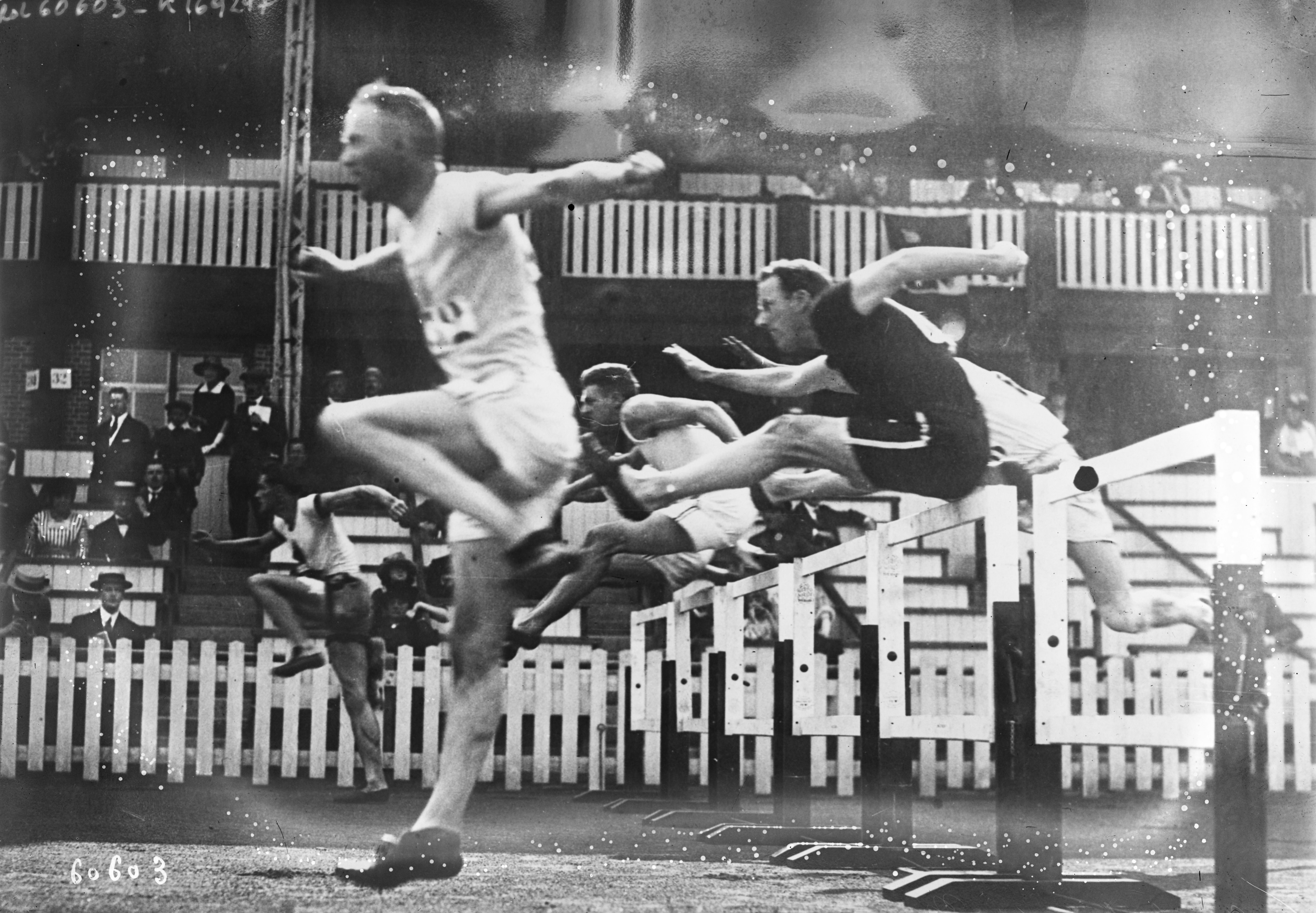
- 110 metres hurdles at the 1920 Summer Olympics
- Venue: Olympisch Stadion
- Dates: August 17–18, 1920
- Competitors: 24 from 15 nations
- Winning time: 14.8 WR

Medalists
1st place, gold medalist(s)		Earl Thomson; Canada
2nd place, silver medalist(s)		Harold Barron; United States
3rd place, bronze medalist(s)		Feg Murray; United States

Official Video

The men's 110 metres hurdles event was part of the track and field athletics programme at the 1920 Summer Olympics. The competition was held on Tuesday, August 17, 1920, and on Wednesday, August 18, 1920. 24 runners from 15 nations competed. No nation had more than 4 runners, suggesting the limit had been reduced from the 12 maximum in force in 1908 and 1912. The event was won by Earl Thomson of Canada in world record time, the first victory by any nation other than the United States in the men's 110 metres hurdles and the first time that any non-U.S. nation had even been on the podium since 1896. Thomson, who had lived in the United States since age 8, had wanted to run for the U.S. team but was ineligible due to his Canadian citizenship. A British flag was displayed at the medal ceremony rather than a Canadian one because the organizing officials did not have the appropriate flag.

== Background ==
This was the sixth appearance of the event, which is one of 12 athletics events to have been held at every Summer Olympics. None of the finalists from the pre-war 1912 Games returned. Earl Thomson of Canada was a heavy favorite; he had won the 1920 AAU championship, IC4A championship (120 yards, in a world record 14.4 seconds), and Canadian Olympic trials.

Czechoslovakia, Denmark, the Netherlands, New Zealand, and Switzerland each made their first appearance in the event. The United States made its sixth appearance, the only nation to have competed in the 110 metres hurdles in each Games to that point.

== Competition format ==
The competition used the three-round basic format introduced in 1908, though the effectiveness of the first round in narrowing the field was dramatically increased compared to 1908 and 1912. The first round consisted of six heats, with between 3 and 5 hurdlers each. The top two hurdlers in each heat advanced to the semifinals. The 12 semifinalists were divided into two semifinals of 6 runners each; the top three hurdlers in each advanced to the 6-man final.

== Records ==
These were the standing world and Olympic records (in seconds) prior to the 1920 Summer Olympics.

World record	Forrest Smithson (USA)	15.0	London, United Kingdom	25 July 1908
Olympic record	Forrest Smithson (USA)	15.0	London, United Kingdom	25 July 1908

In the semifinals, Harold Barron and Earl Thomson equalled the world record with 15.0 seconds. In the final, Earl Thomson set a new world record with 14.8 seconds.

== Schedule ==
Date	Time	Round
Tuesday, 17 August 1920	14:00; 16:30	Round 1 Semifinals
Wednesday, 18 August 1920	14:30	Final

== Results ==
=== Quarterfinals ===
==== Quarterfinal 1 ====
Rank	Athlete	Nation	Time	Notes
1	Daciano Colbacchini	Italy	15.6	Q
2	Harry Wilson	New Zealand	15.8	Q
3	Georg Lindström	Sweden	15.9	
4	Wilfred Kent-Hughes	Australia	Unknown	

==== Quarterfinal 2 ====
Rank	Athlete	Nation	Time	Notes
1	Harold Barron	United States	15.2	Q
2	Earl Thomson	Canada	15.4	Q
3	Gösta Holmér	Sweden	Unknown	
4	František Marek	Czechoslovakia	Unknown	

==== Quarterfinal 3 ====
Rank	Athlete	Nation	Time	Notes
1	Feg Murray	United States	15.8	Q
2	George Gray	Great Britain	Unknown	Q
3	Henri Bernard	France	Unknown	
4	René Joannes-Powell	Belgium	Unknown	
5	Dimitrios Andromedas	Greece	Unknown	

==== Quarterfinal 4 ====
Rank	Athlete	Nation	Time	Notes
1	Henri Thorsen	Denmark	16.8	Q
2	William Hunter	Great Britain	Unknown	Q
—	Willi Moser	Switzerland	DNF	

==== Quarterfinal 5 ====
Rank	Athlete	Nation	Time	Notes
1	William Yount	United States	15.6	Q
2	Göran Hultin	Sweden	Unknown	Q
3	Harold Jeppe	South Africa	Unknown	
4	Adolf Reich	Czechoslovakia	Unknown	

==== Quarterfinal 6 ====
Rank	Athlete	Nation	Time	Notes
1	Walker Smith	United States	15.8	Q
2	Carl-Axel Christiernsson	Sweden	Unknown	Q
3	Oscar van Rappard	Netherlands	Unknown	
4	Eric Dunbar	Great Britain	Unknown	

=== Semifinals ===
==== Semifinal 1 ====
Rank	Athlete	Nation	Time	Notes
1	Harold Barron	United States	15.0	Q, =WR
2	Walker Smith	United States	15.2	Q
3	Harry Wilson	New Zealand	15.3	Q
4	Henri Thorsen	Denmark	Unknown	
5	William Hunter	Great Britain	Unknown	
6	Göran Hultin	Sweden	Unknown	

==== Semifinal 2 ====
Rank	Athlete	Nation	Time	Notes
1	Earl Thomson	Canada	15.0	Q, =WR
2	Feg Murray	United States	15.2	Q
3	Carl-Axel Christiernsson	Sweden	15.2	Q
4	George Gray	Great Britain	Unknown	
5	William Yount	United States	Unknown	
6	Daciano Colbacchini	Italy	Unknown	

=== Final ===
The final was held on Wednesday, August 18, 1920.

Rank	Athlete	Nation	Time	Notes
1	Earl Thomson	Canada	14.8	WR
2	Harold Barron	United States	15.1	
3	Feg Murray	United States	15.1	
4	Harry Wilson	New Zealand	15.2	
5	Walker Smith	United States	15.3	
6	Carl-Axel Christiernsson	Sweden	15.3	

== Notes ==
- Belgium Olympic Committee (1957). Olympic Games Antwerp 1920: Official Report (in French).
- Wudarski, Pawel (1999). "Wyniki Igrzysk Olimpijskich" (in Polish).
