= František Marek =

František Marek can refer to:

- František Marek (architect) (1899-1971), Czech architect
- František Marek (hurdler), Czech Olympic hurdler
