= Frank Loomis =

American athlete

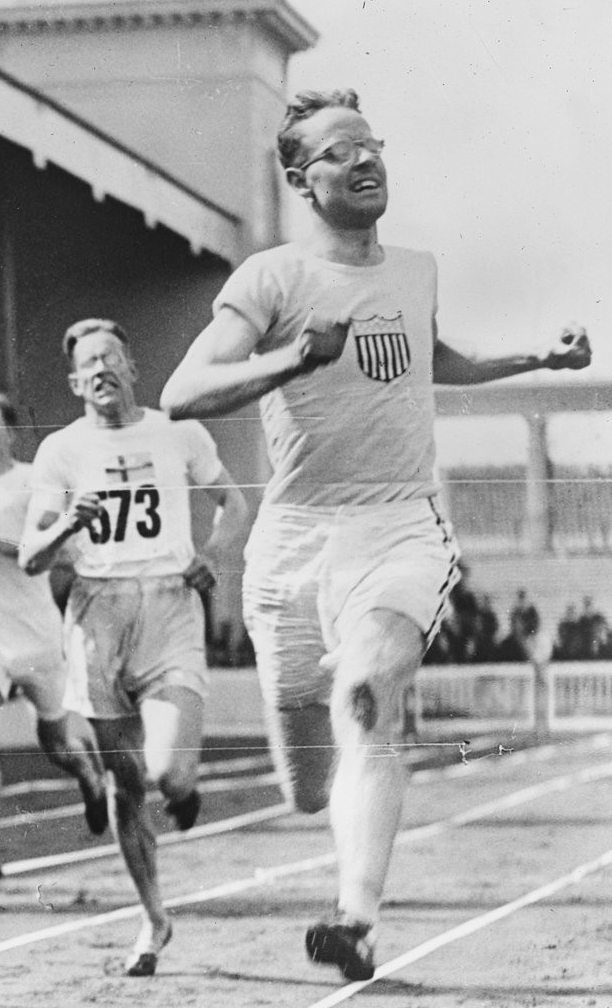
- Loomis (center) nearing the finish in Heat 2 of the semi-final round of the 400 meter hurdles at the 1920 Olympics, Aug. 15, Carl Axel Christiernsson of Sweden left

Personal information
- Full name: Frank Farmer Loomis Jr.
- Born: August 22, 1896 Saint Paul, Minnesota, U.S.
- Died: April 4, 1971 (aged 74) New Port Richey, Florida, U.S.
- Occupations: Collegiate Track, Football Coach; Advertising Manager
- Height: 6 ft 2 in (1.88 m)
- Spouses: Frances Laroque (Around 1918); Dorothy Morehead (Dec. 1936)
- Relatives: Jo Gilbert Loomis; 1920 Olympic Alternate

Sport
- Country: United States
- Sport: Athletics, Hurdles
- Event: 400 m hurdles
- Club: Chicago Athletic Association

Achievements and titles
- Personal best: 400 m Hurdles – 54.0 (1920)
Medal record
Men's athletics
Representing the United States
Olympic Games
Gold medal – first place	1920 Antwerp	400 m hurdles

Frank Farmer Loomis Jr. (August 22, 1896 – April 4, 1971) was an American athlete, and world record holder who captured a gold medal in the 400 m hurdles at the 1920 Summer Olympics in Antwerp. He later had a career as a collegiate track coach and an Advertising Executive for retail food with the Chicago American newspaper.

== Early life ==
Loomis was born August 22, 1896, one of around six siblings to Mr. and Mrs. Frank Loomis Sr., in St. Paul, Minnesota. He attended Kenosha High School in Kenosha, Wisconsin, where he began his career in track. After a family move, he attended High School in Evanston, Illinois, a Chicago suburb, until 1914. Upon meeting his future Oregon High School track teammate Sherman Landers, he transferred to Oregon, Illinois where he attended Oregon High School in his Senior year, so he could continue to train with Landers. As a Senior at Oregon High School in Illinois, Loomis established an interscholastic record of 24.2 for the 220y hurdles. As early as 1911-12, Loomis represented the Chicago Athletic Association. In 1915, he was coached at the Chicago Athletic Association by Martin Delaney. Frank's brother, Jo Gilbert Loomis, who competed in track for the University of Wisconsin, served as an alternate sprinter for the U.S. track team at the 1920 Olympics.

== 1920 Antwerp Olympics ==
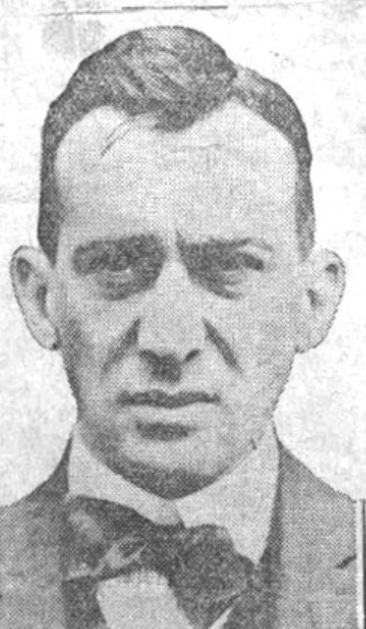
Penn Coach L. Robertson, 1916

Loomis was managed by Olympic Assistant Track Coach Lawson Robertson of the University of Pennsylvania, at the 1920 Antwerp Olympics. He captured a gold medal in the August 15-16 400 m hurdles at Antwerp. He was an AAU champion in the 220 yd (200 m) hurdles in 1917 and 1918 and in the 440 yd (400 m) hurdles in 1920.

Despite Loomis's AAU hurdles championships in 1917 and 1918, the favorite at the 1920 Olympics was John Norton, who had run a new world record of 54.2 just two months before the Olympics. Loomis won the 400 m hurdles final easily in a new world record of 54.0, beating Norton who followed in second place 0.6 seconds later. The American team swept the medals with Loomis taking the gold, rival John Norton taking the silver with an estimated time of 54.6, and Gus Desch taking the bronze with an estimated time of 54.8.

=== Careers ===
Loomis served as a Coach and Athletic Director and track and football coach for Hastings College in Hastings, Nebraska in 1921, and then coached Track for the University of Nebraska in Lincoln. He later coached the U.S. Women's 1932 Olympic track team.

For three decades, in his primary career, he worked for the Chicago American Newspaper Company as the Advertising Manager for retail food.

=== Marriages ===
He was initially married to Frances Laroque of Chicago's Hyde Park around 1918, but the couple divorced around 1920. He married Dorothy Morehead in Chicago on December 12, 1936, to whom he remained married through the remainder of his life. Dorothy and Frank had children.

=== Honors ===
Landers-Loomis Field in Oregon, Illinois, is named partially in his honor.

Nearing retirement in 1962, Loomis moved to St. Joseph, Florida then relocated to New Port, Richey, Florida in 1968. He died at the age of 74 on the early morning of April 4, 1971, at his New Port, Richey, Florida home. He was survived by his wife Dorothy, two daughters, a son, and seven grandchildren. Funeral services were held mid-day on April 7, at the Kerlikowske and Starks Funeral Home in Michigan, and he was buried at North Shore Memory Gardens in Coloma, Michigan.
