= Pomona–Pitzer Sagehens =

Joint athletics program of Pomona College and Pitzer College

- College: Pomona College; Pitzer College
- Nickname: Sagehens
- NCAA: Division III
- Conference: SCIAC
- Athletic director: Miriam Merrill
- Location: Claremont, California
- Varsity teams: 21 (11 women's, 10 men's)
- Football stadium: Merritt Field
- Basketball arena: Voelkel Gymnasium
- Baseball stadium: Alumni Field
- Softball stadium: Pomona–Pitzer Softball Field
- Soccer stadium: Pomona–Pitzer Soccer Field
- Aquatics center: Haldeman Aquatics Center
- Lacrosse stadium: South Athletics Complex
- Tennis venue: Pauley Tennis Complex
- Outdoor track and field venue: Strehle Track
- Colors: Blue and orange
- Mascot: Cecil the Sagehen
- Website: sagehens.com
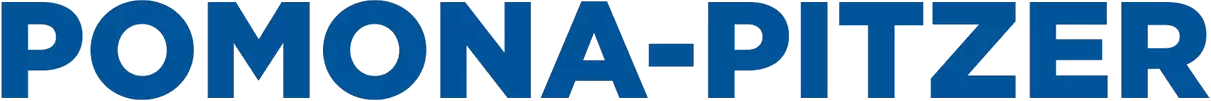

Team NCAA championships
- 4

Individual and relay NCAA champions
- 50

The Pomona–Pitzer Sagehens are the joint varsity intercollegiate athletic programs for Pomona College and Pitzer College, two of the Claremont Colleges. It competes with 11 women's and 10 men's teams in the Southern California Intercollegiate Athletic Conference (SCIAC) of the NCAA Division III.

Pomona's teams were formed in 1895, and it was a founding member of the SCIAC in 1914. The college competed with Claremont Men's College (CMC) for a decade beginning in 1946, and joined with Pitzer in 1970.

Pomona-Pitzer's mascot is Cecil the Sagehen, a greater sage-grouse. Its primary rival is the Claremont-Mudd-Scripps Stags and Athenas, the joint team of the three other undergraduate Claremont Colleges.

Sagehens have won 50 individual and four team national championships. Alumni have become Olympic athletes and world record holders in various sports.

== Sports ==
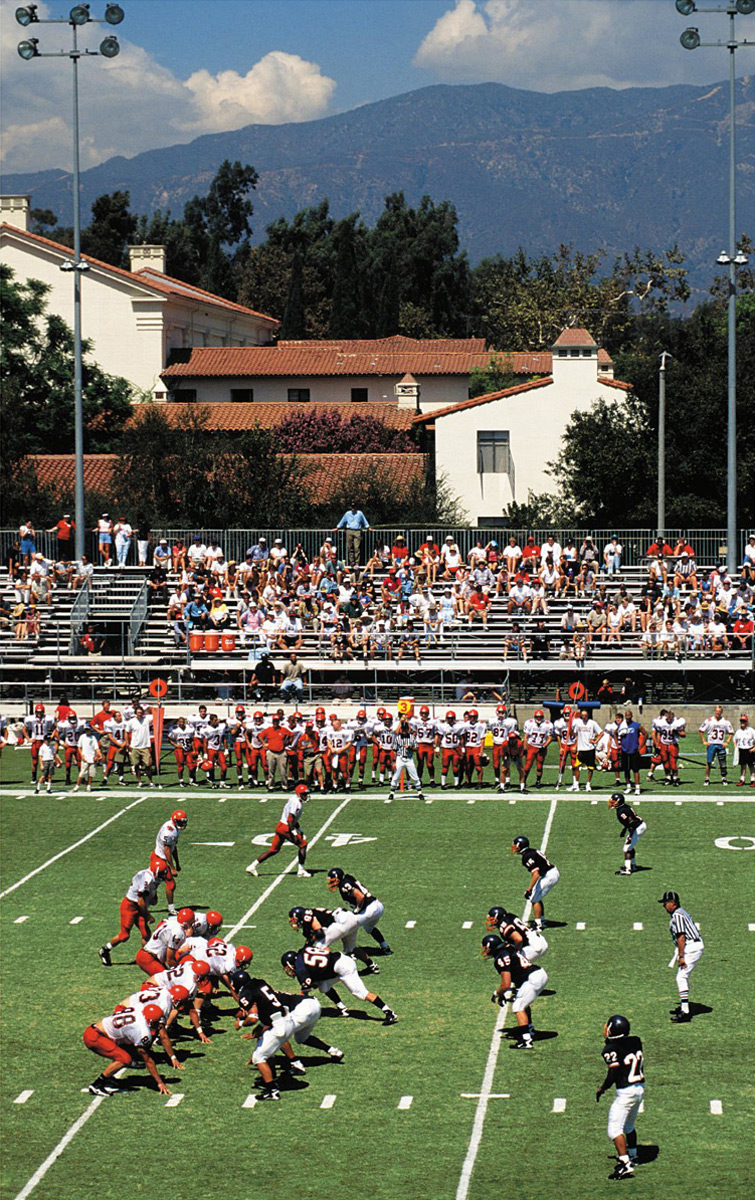
A Pomona-Pitzer football game on Merritt Field

There are 11 women's and 10 men's teams.

Varsity teams
| Women's | Men's |
|---|---|
| Basketball | Baseball |
| Cross country | Basketball |
| Golf | Cross country |
| Lacrosse | Football |
| Soccer | Golf |
| Softball | Soccer |
| Swimming and diving | Swimming and diving |
| Tennis | Tennis |
| Track and field | Track and field |
| Volleyball | Water polo |
| Water polo | |

== History ==
Pomona College's first intercollegiate sports teams were formed in 1895. The college was one of the three founding members of the SCIAC in 1914, and its football team played in the inaugural game at the Los Angeles Coliseum in 1923, losing to the University of Southern California Trojans. From 1946 to 1956, Pomona joined with Claremont Men's College (CMC) to compete as Pomona-Claremont. In 1970, Pomona began competing with Pitzer College (then seven years old) on an interim basis, and the arrangement became permanent two years later.

The Sagehens ranked 15th out of 323 competing Division III schools and 2nd among SCIAC schools in the 2024‍–‍2025 Division III NACDA Directors' Cup, which ranks athletics programs and awards points relative to their finish in NCAA championships. The water polo, track and field, women's soccer, and women's tennis teams are regarded as particularly strong.

Early athletics at Pomona

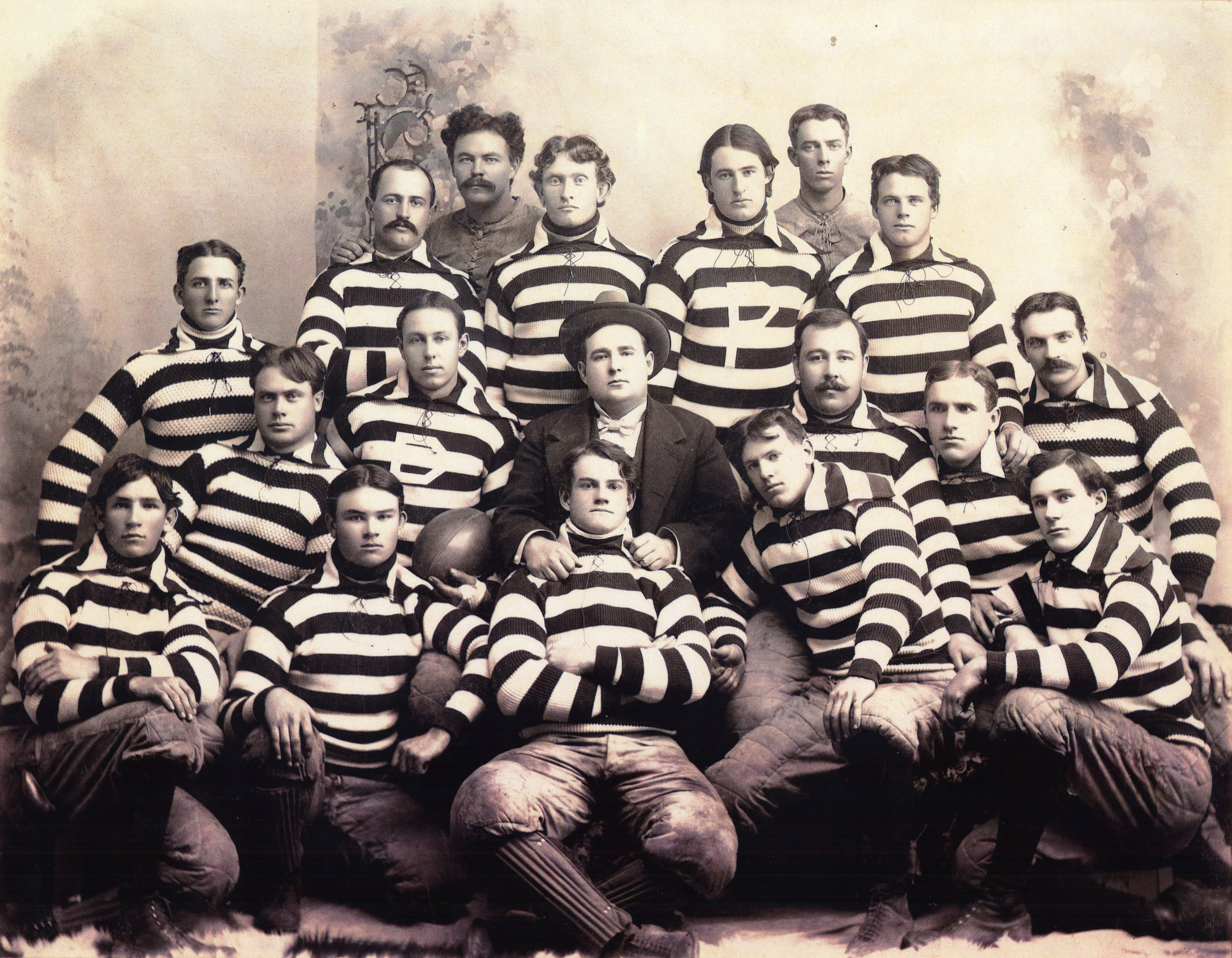
Football team, c. 1899

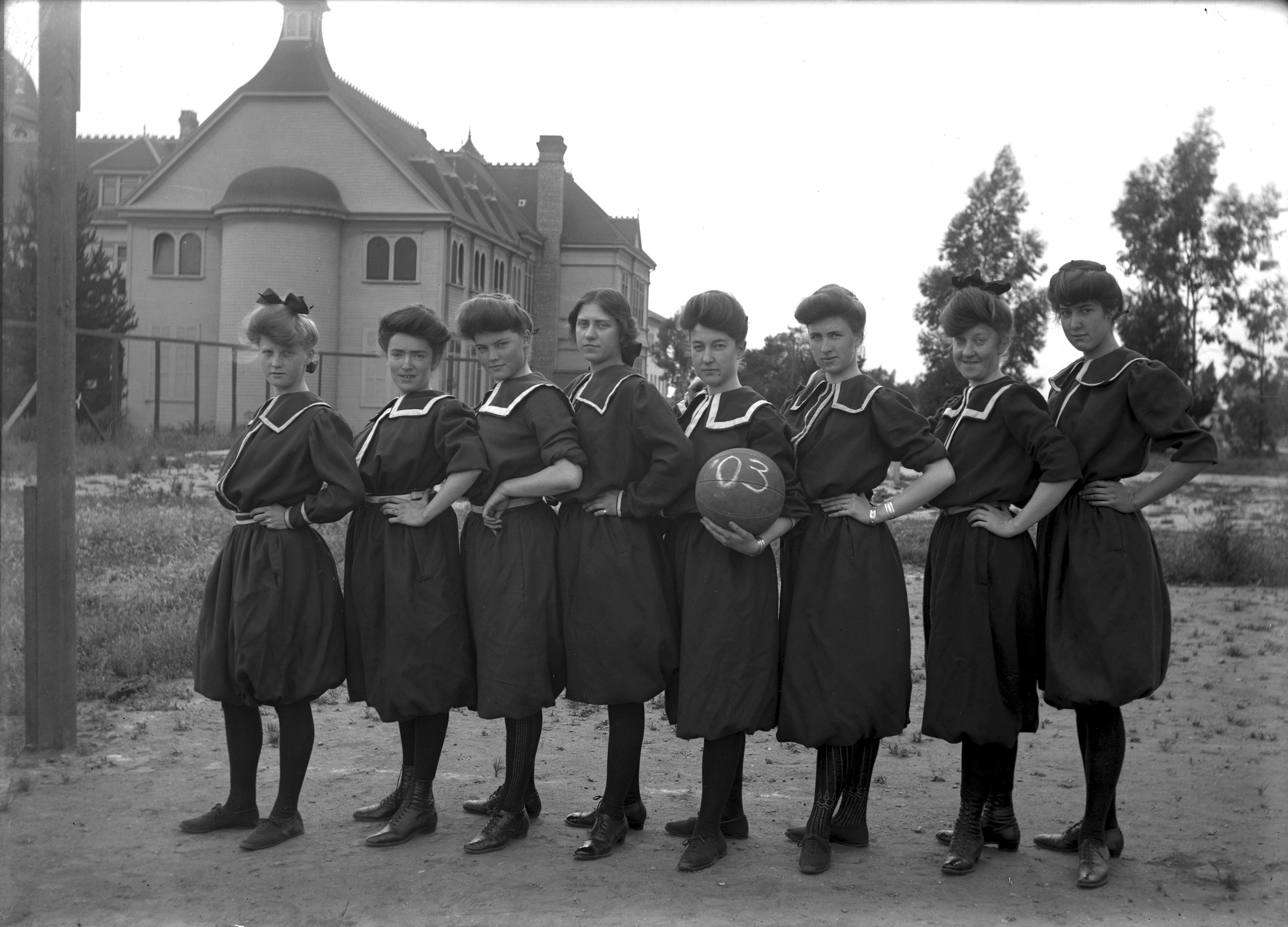
Pomona organized the first women's basketball team in Southern California in 1903.

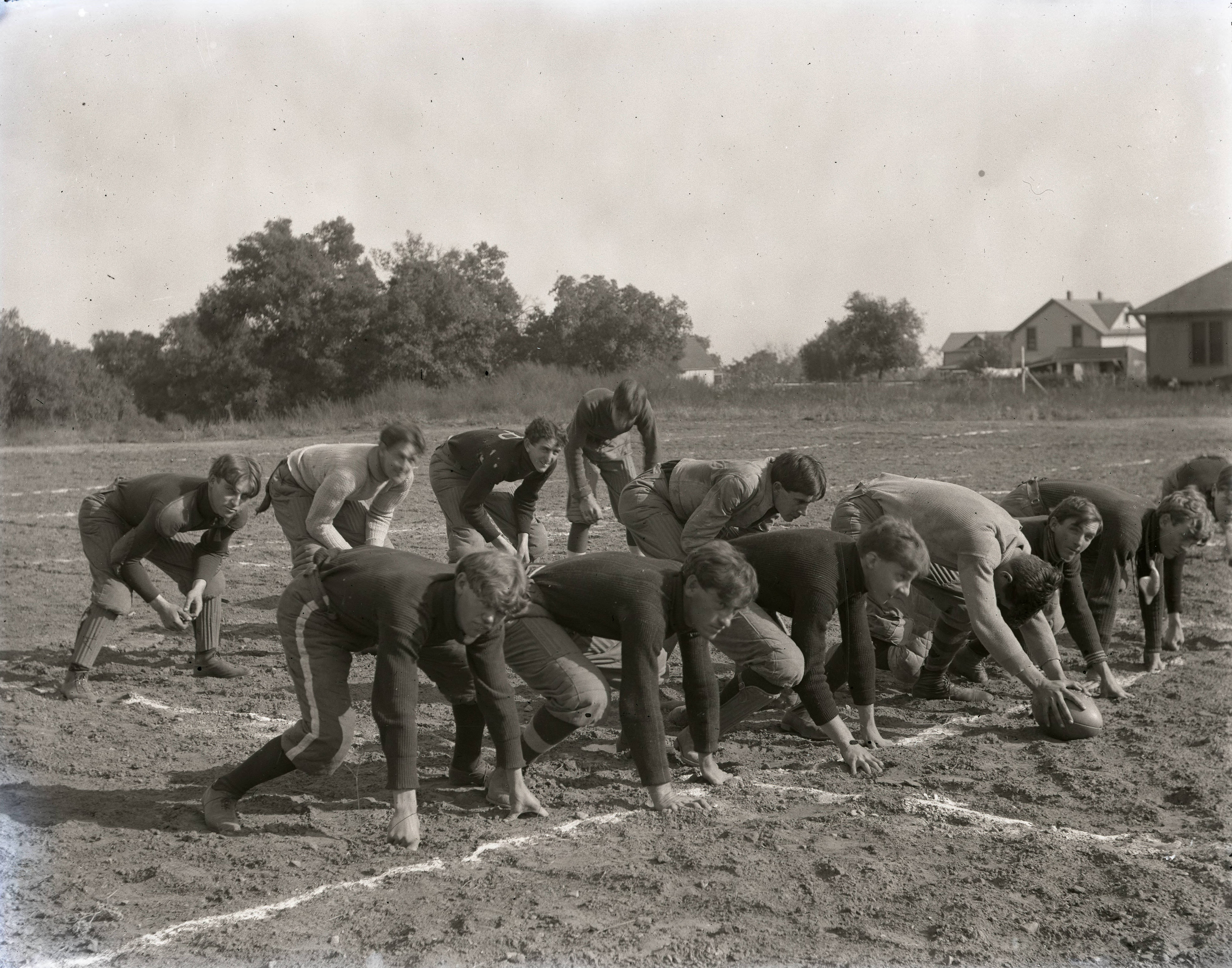
Football team class of 1907

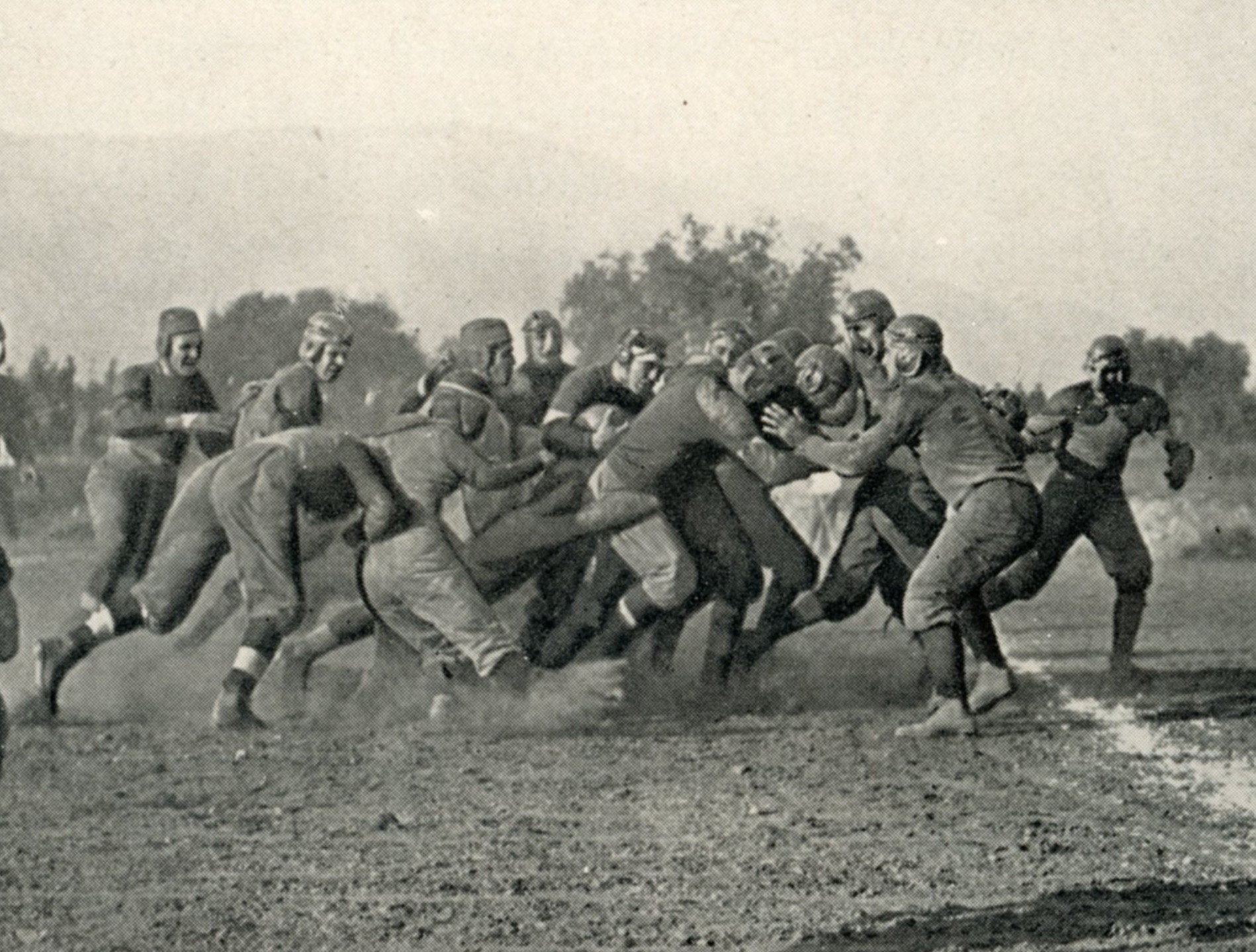
Football team in 1911

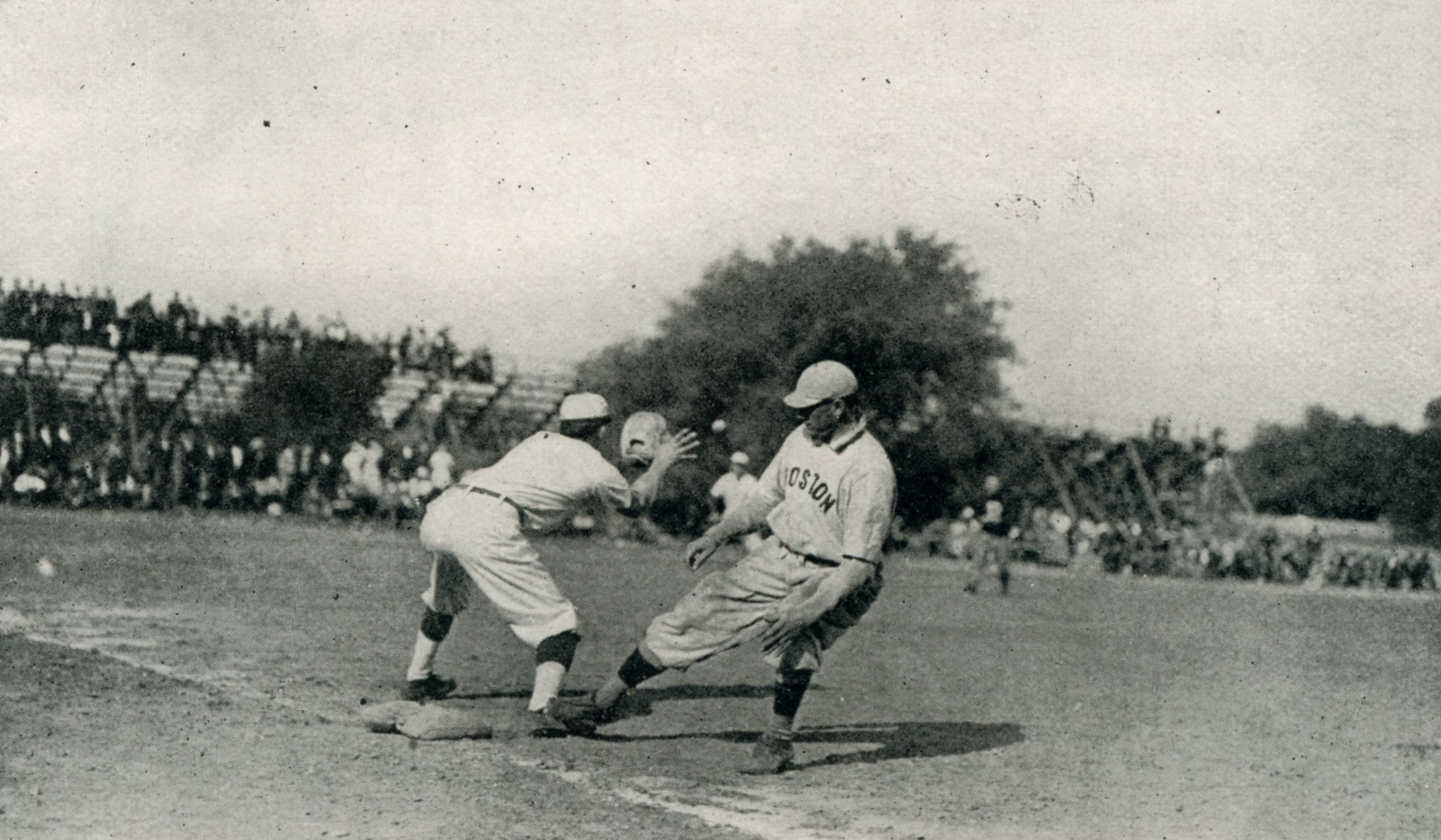
Baseball team playing the Boston Red Sox, 1911

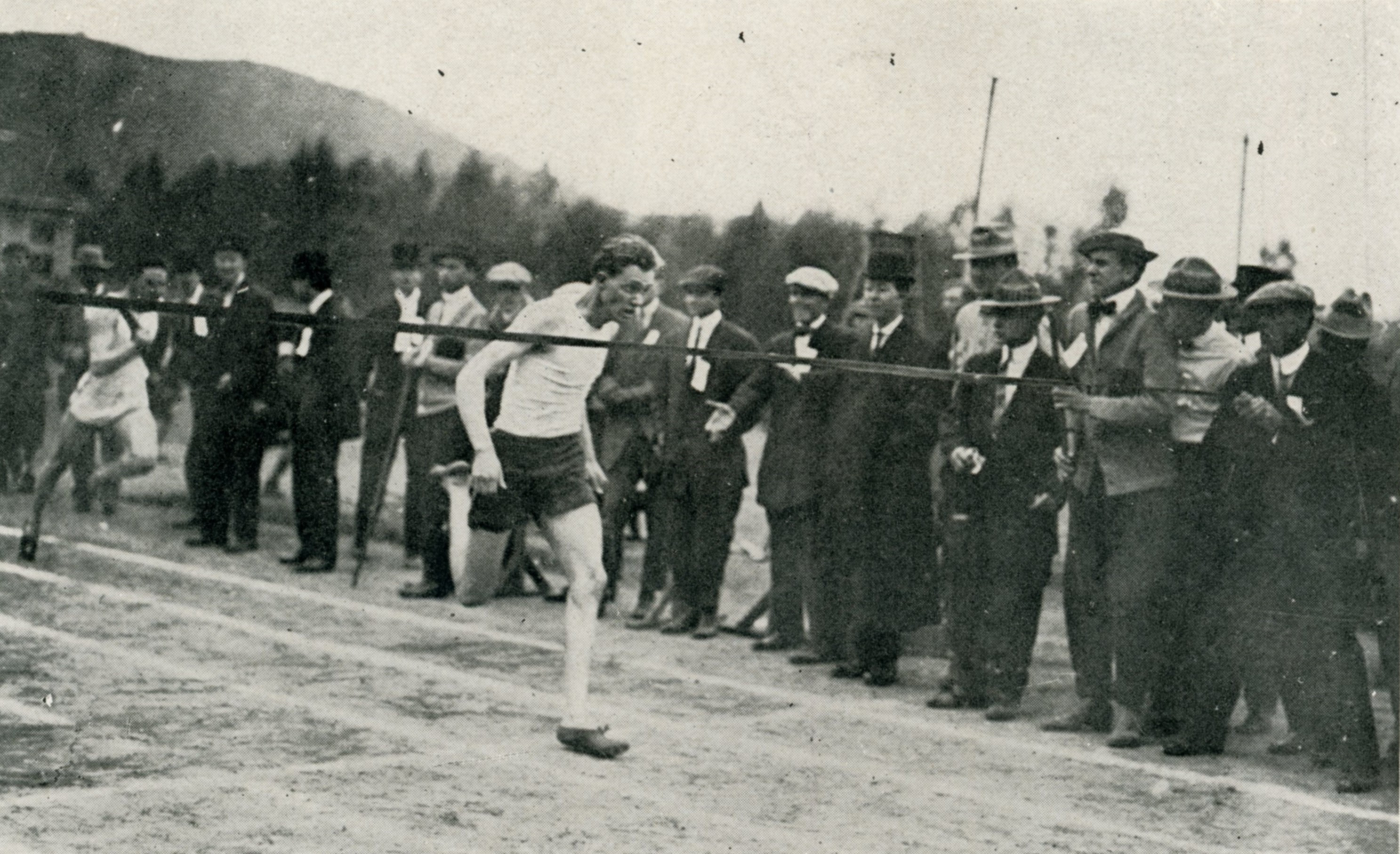
Track meet, 1912

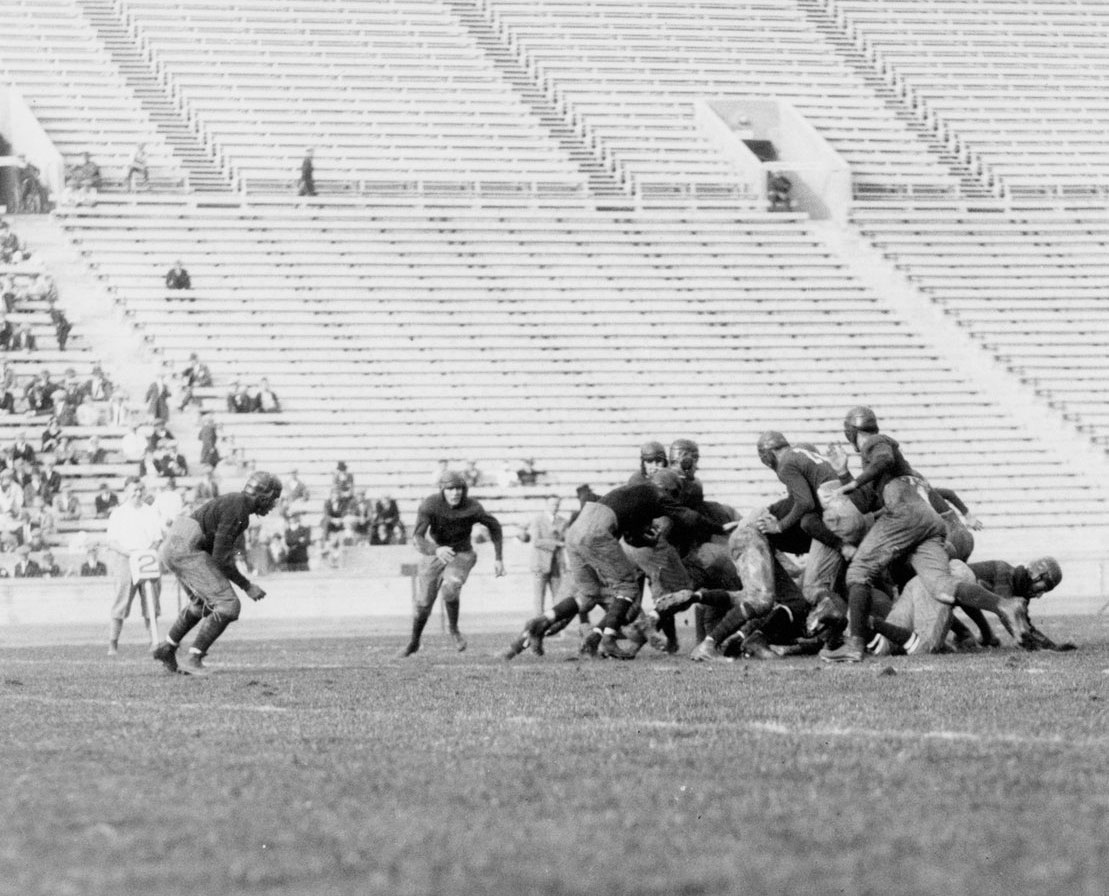
Football team playing USC in the inaugural L.A. Coliseum game, 1923

== National championships ==
The Sagehens have won 50 individual NCAA Division III championships: 19 in men's track and field, 12 in women's swimming and diving, 9 in women's tennis, 6 in men's swimming and diving, and 4 in women's track and field. Additionally, they have won four team titles: women's tennis in 1992, back-to-back titles in men's cross country in 2019 and 2021, and an additional title in men's cross country in 2023.

Team champshionships
| Sport | Year | Opponent/runner-up | Score | Ref. |
|---|---|---|---|---|
| Women's tennis | 1992 | Kenyon | 5–4 | |
| Men's cross country (3) | 2019 | North Central (IL) | 164–182 | |
| Men's cross country (3) | 2021 | MIT | 80–112 | |
| Men's cross country (3) | 2023 | Wisconsin–La Crosse | 158–159 | |

== Facilities ==
Pomona-Pitzer's primary indoor athletics facility is the Center for Athletics, Recreation, and Wellness (CARW), (Note: The acronym "CARW" is seldom used by students, who instead refer to the gym generically. Some have proposed rearranging the letters to form the more pronounceable "CRAW".) located near the center of Pomona's campus. It was reconstructed and renovated in 2022, replacing the Liliore Green Rains Center for Sport and Recreation, built in 1989. The gym is complemented by various outdoor facilities, mostly located within the naturalistic eastern portion of Pomona's campus known as the Wash.

Pomona-Pitzer athletics facilities

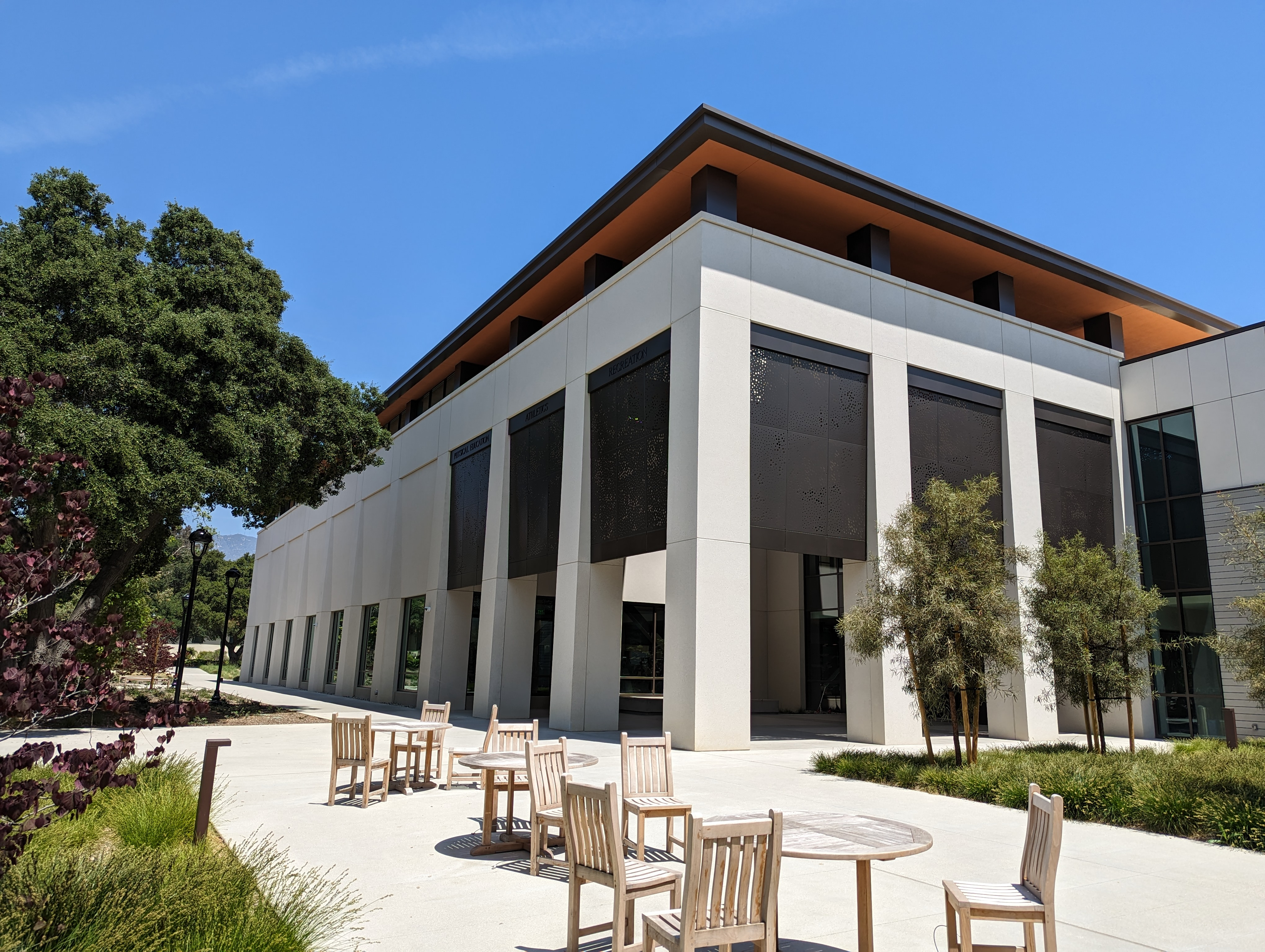
Gym main entrance

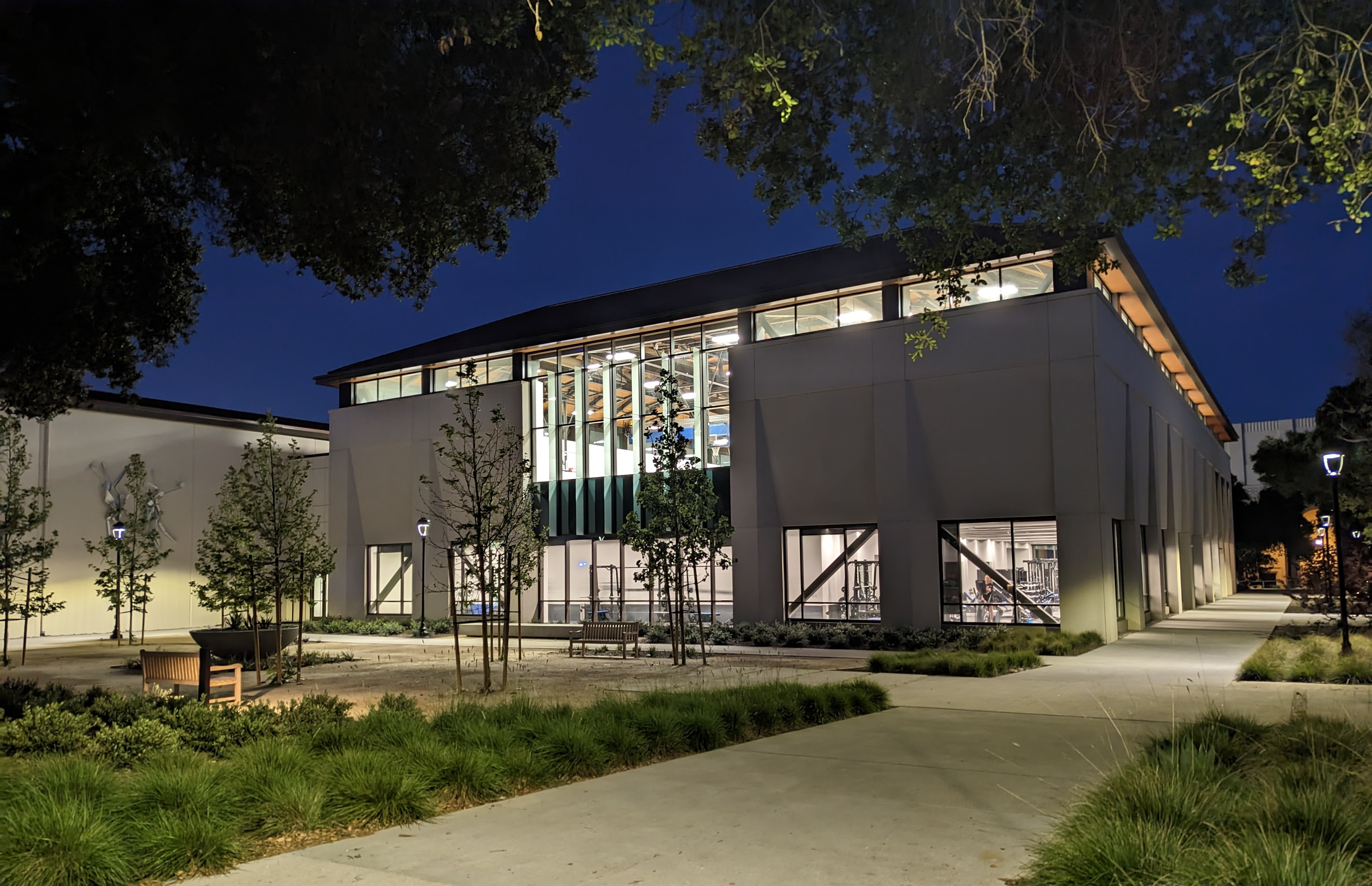
Gym north façade at night

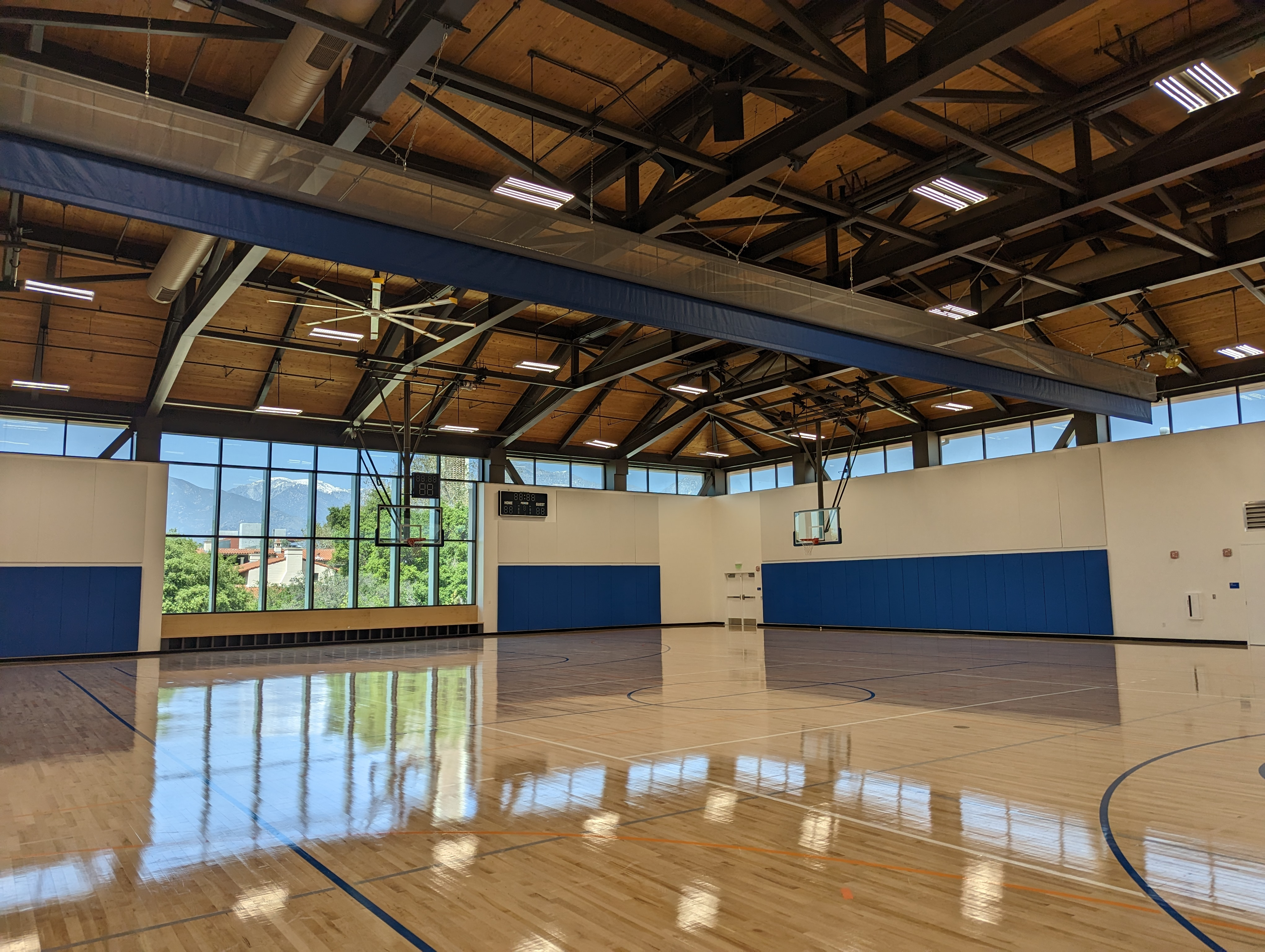
Practice gym

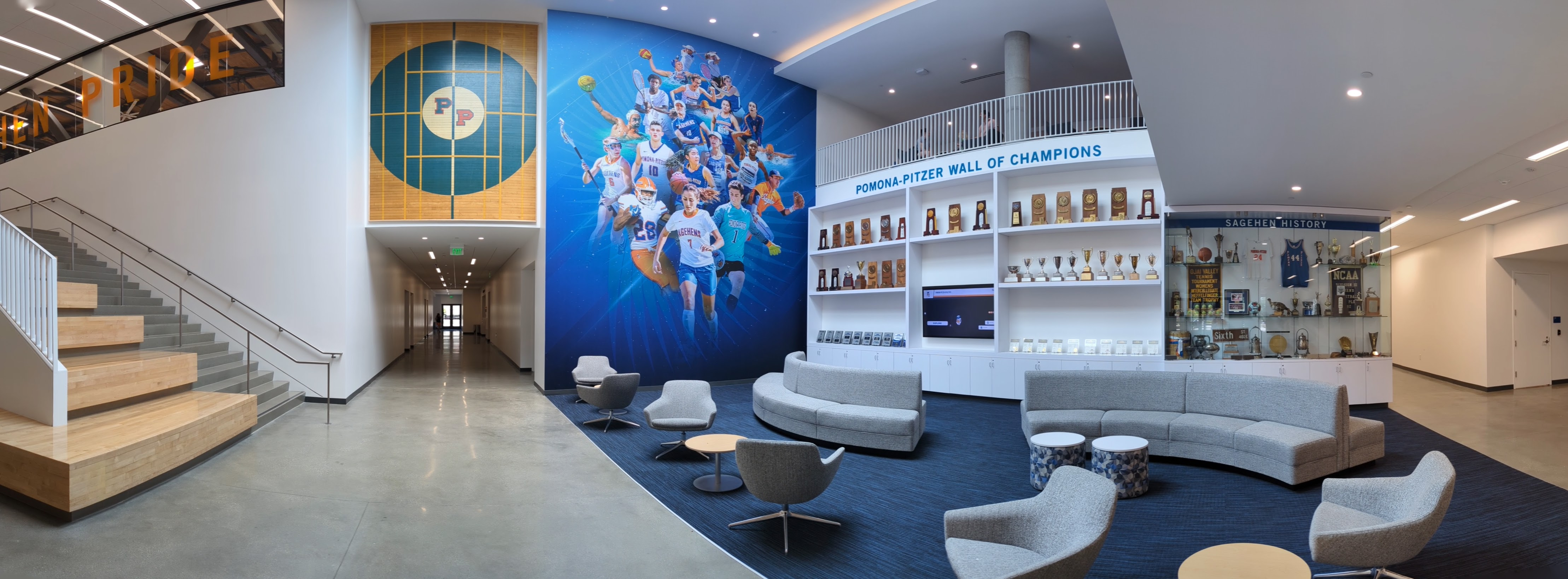
Gym lobby

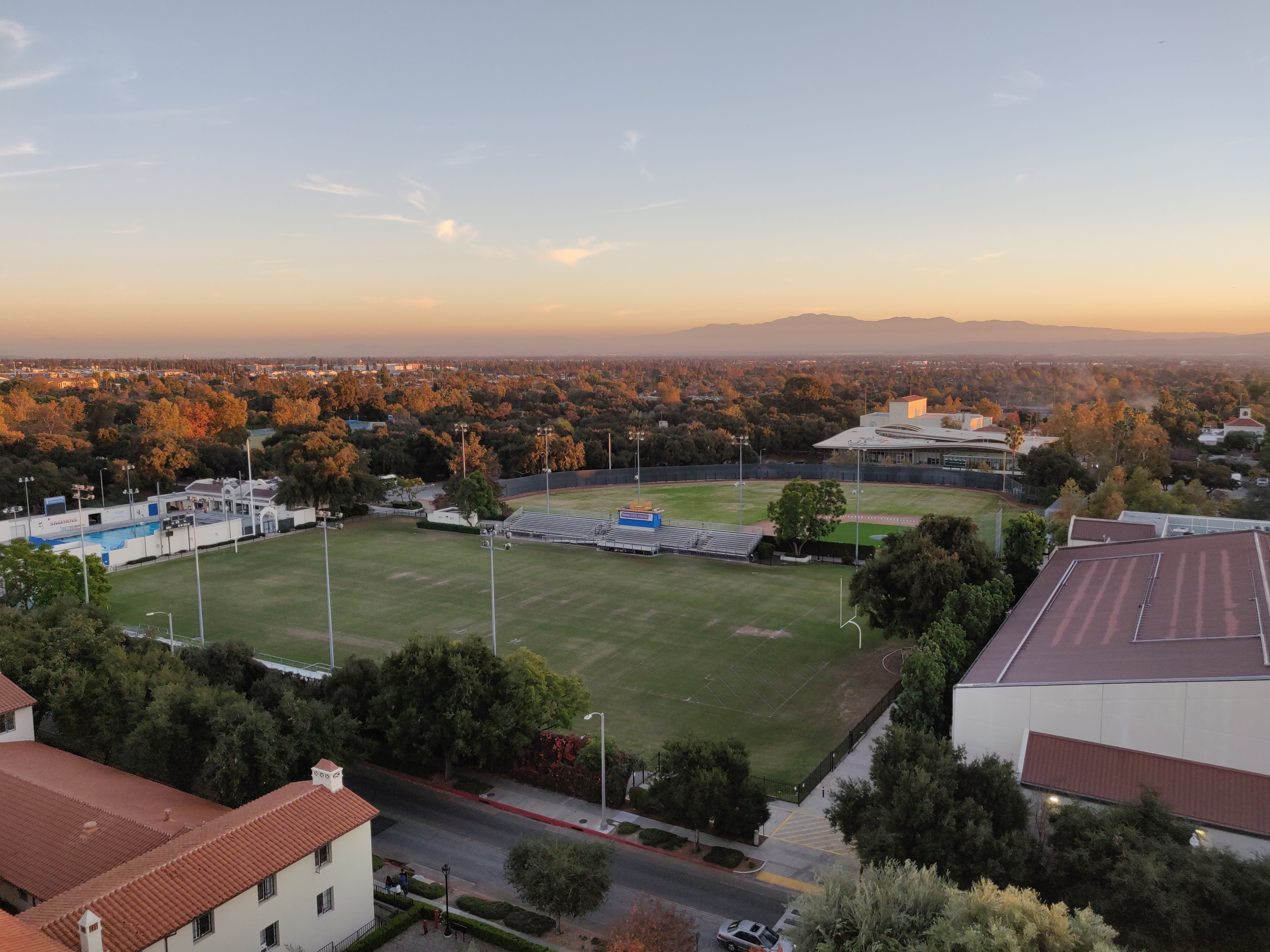
Merritt Field

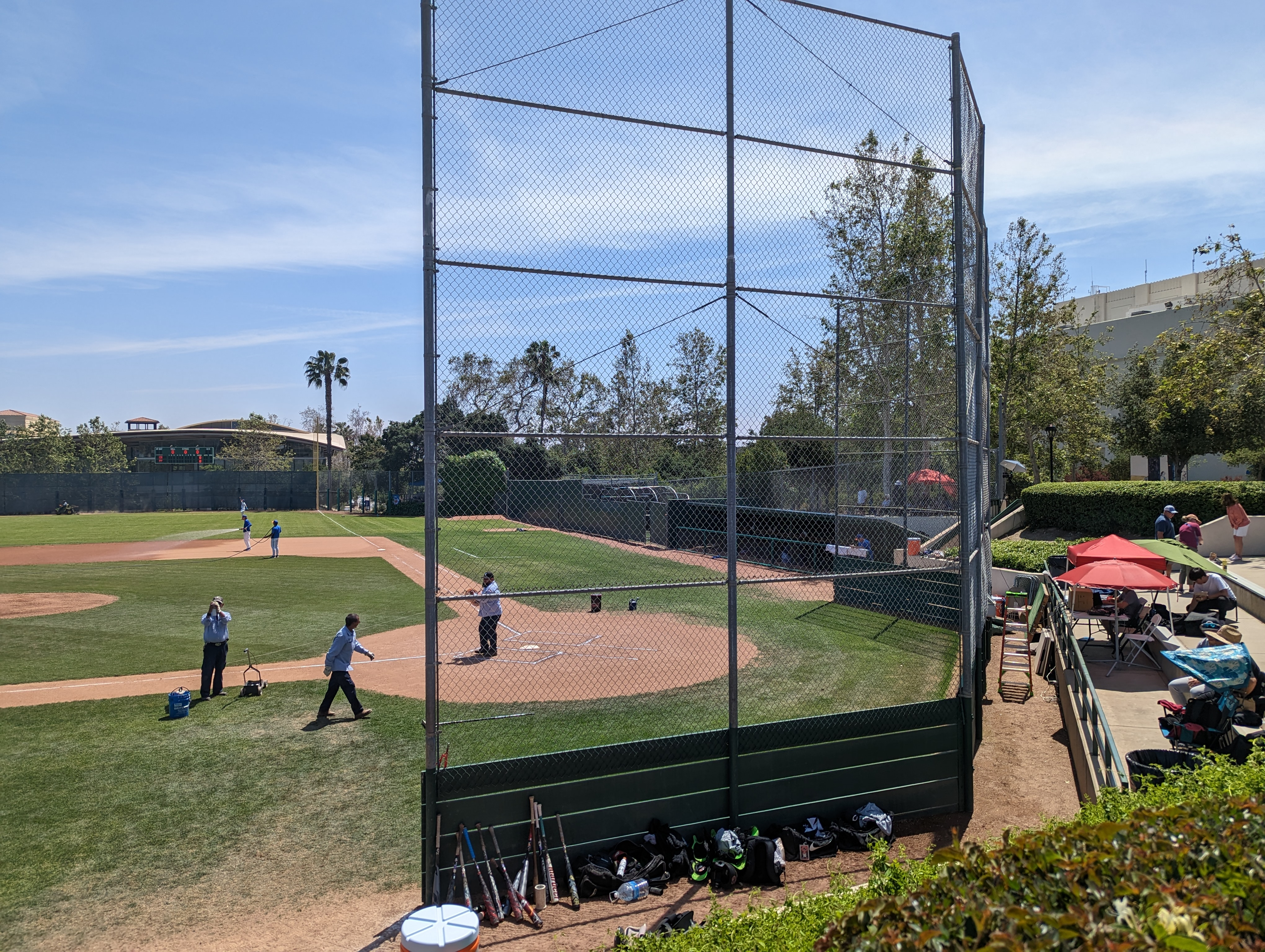
Alumni Baseball Field

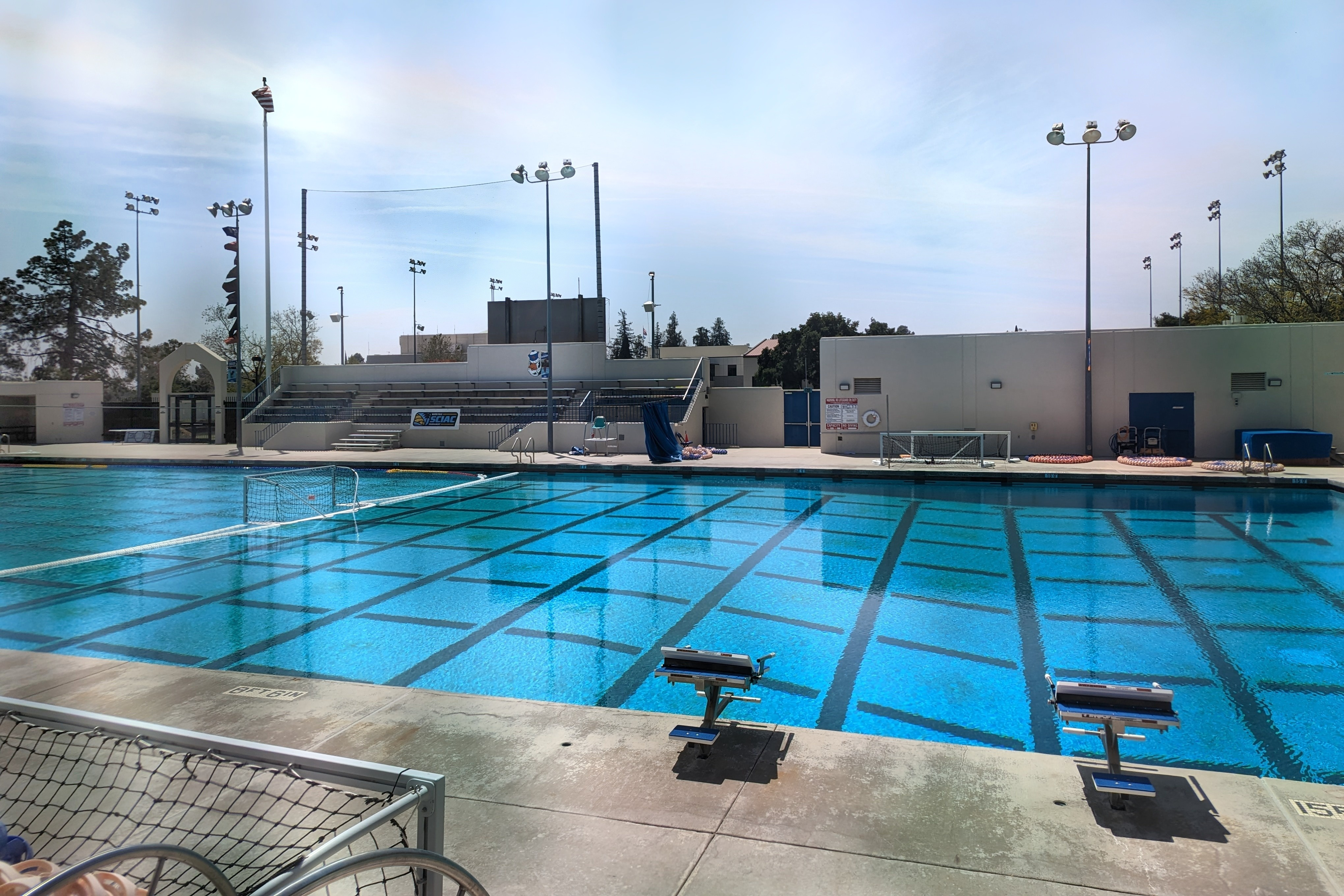
Haldeman Aquatics Center

== Nickname and mascot ==
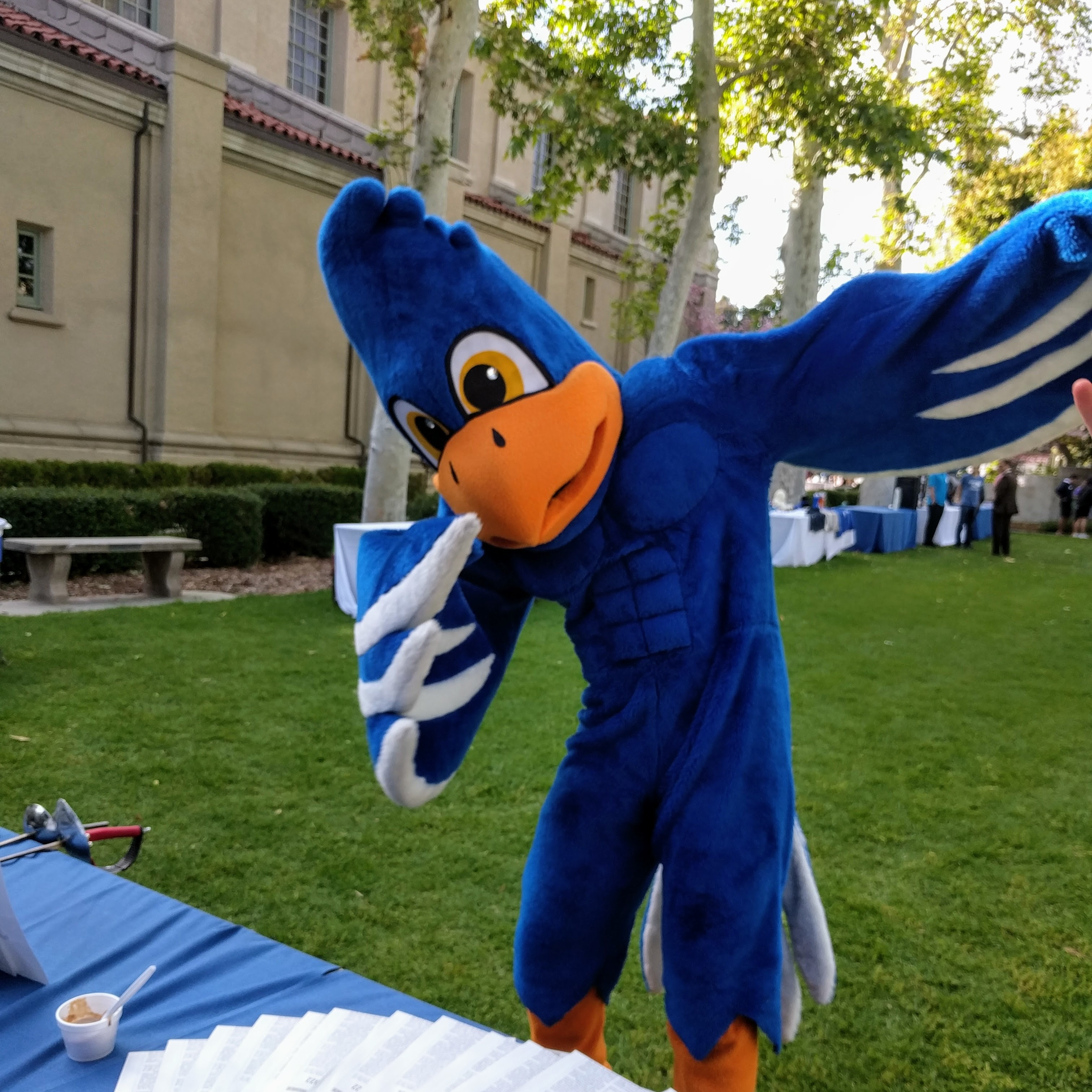
The third iteration of the Cecil the Sagehen costume (adopted in 2017) dabbing

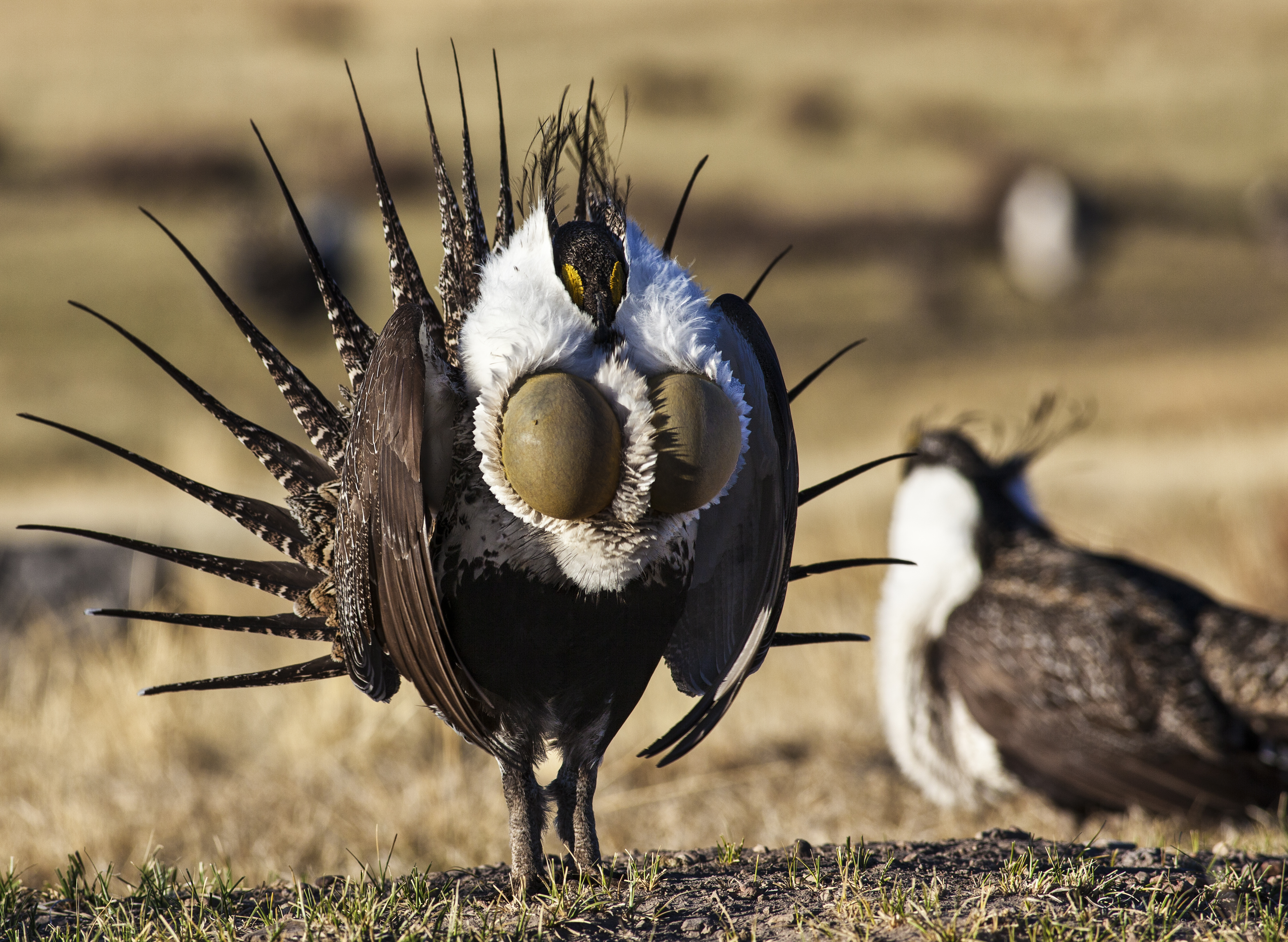
A male sagehen with its gular sacs inflated during a courtship ritual

The official mascot of the team is Cecil the Sagehen, a greater sage-grouse (Centrocercus urophasianus). The bird is a large ground-dweller native to the western United States (although not Southern California), and is distinguished by its long, pointed tail and complex lek mating system. It is named after the sagebrush on which it feeds.

Pomona-Pitzer is the only team in the world to use the Sagehen as a mascot, and it is often noted for its goofiness. Rather than in the grouse's natural brown and white colors, the mascot is rendered in the team's official colors, blue (for Pomona) and orange (for Pitzer).

The precise origin of the nickname is unknown. Pomona competed under a variety of names in its early years, including "the Blue and White" and "the Huns". The first known appearance of "Sagehens" was in a 1913 issue of The Student Life newspaper, and in 1918 it became the sole nickname. Later Pomona-Claremont began using it, and it is now the nickname for the combined Pomona-Pitzer team. The first known reference to "Cecil" was made in the 1946 Metate (Pomona's yearbook).

== Rivalry ==
The Sagehens' primary rival is the Claremont-Mudd-Scripps Stags and Athenas, the joint team of the three other undergraduate Claremont Colleges. The rivalry is known as the Sixth Street Rivalry, referring to the street that separates the teams' athletics facilities. Historically, Pomona had a rivalry with the Occidental College Tigers.

== Notable athletes ==
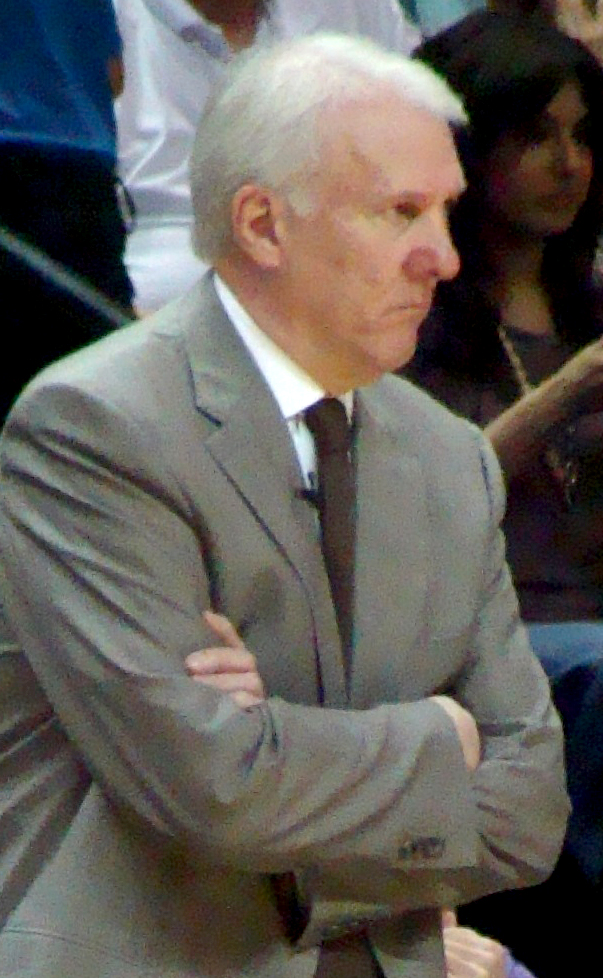
NBA Championship head coach of the San Antonio Spurs Gregg Popovich coached the Pomona men's basketball team from 1979 to 1987.

Pomona athletes
| Name | Class year | Notability | Ref. |
|---|---|---|---|
| Harry Kingman | 1913 | Pitcher for the New York Yankees | |
| Charles Daggs | 1923 | Olympic track and field athlete | |
| Robert Maxwell | 1925 | Olympic hurdler and two-time national champion | |
| Earl J. Merritt | 1925 | Head football coach of the Sagehens from 1935 to 1958 | |
| David G. Freeman | 1942 | Seven-time U.S. national badminton champion | |
| Betty Hicks | 1947 | Golfer, 1941 Associated Press Female Athlete of the Year | |
| Darlene Hard | 1961 | Grand Slam–winning tennis player | |
| Marilyn Ramenofsky | 1969 | Olympic silver medalist swimmer, and former women's 400-meter freestyle world record holder | |
| Penny Lee Dean | 1977 | Long-distance swimmer and world record-holder for the fastest swim across the English Channel in 1978; later coached the Pomona women's swimming and diving team for more than 25 years | |
| Mike Budenholzer | 1992 | Head coach of the Atlanta Hawks, Milwaukee Bucks, and Phoenix Suns | |
| Will Leer | 2007 | Professional track and field athlete specializing in the 1500 meters | |
| Andrew Palmer | 2014 | Racing driver | |
| Daniel Rosenbaum | 2019 | Professional basketball player in the Israeli Basketball Premier League | |
