= Hultin =

Hultin is a Swedish surname. Notable people with the surname include:

- Eleonor Hultin, Swedish footballer
- Göran Hultin (1897–1949), Swedish athlete
- Ida Hultin (1858–1938), American advocate for woman suffrage
- Jerry MacArthur Hultin (born 1942), United States Navy officer
- Johan Hultin (1924–2022), Swedish-American pathologist
- Katie Hultin (born 1982), American women's soccer player
- Randi Hultin (1926–2000), Norwegian journalist and critic
