= New Zealand at the 1920 Summer Olympics =

- IOC code: NZL
- NOC: Olympic Council of New Zealand
- Website: www.olympic.org.nz

in Antwerp
- Competitors: 4 in 3 sports
- Flag bearer: Harry Wilson (athlete)
- Medals Ranked 22nd: Gold 0 Silver 0 Bronze 1 Total 1

Summer Olympics appearances (overview)
- 1908; 1912; 1920; 1924; 1928; 1932; 1936; 1948; 1952; 1956; 1960; 1964; 1968; 1972; 1976; 1980; 1984; 1988; 1992; 1996; 2000; 2004; 2008; 2012; 2016; 2020; 2024

Other related appearances
- Australasia (1908–1912)

New Zealand competed at the 1920 Summer Olympics in Antwerp, Belgium. It was the first time that the nation had competed independently at the Olympic Games (even though the International Olympic Committee had a New Zealand member — Leonard Cuff — at its establishment). At the 1908 and 1912 Summer Olympics, New Zealand had competed with Australia in a combined team called Australasia.

The New Zealand team consisted of four competitors including the first woman to represent New Zealand at the Olympic Games, Violet Walrond who was only aged 15 at the time. The team can be considered one of the most successful ever as all team members finished fifth or better in at least one of their events. The opening flagbearer was hurdler Harry Wilson. Walrond's father Cecil, generally known as Tui Walrond, was both her chaperone and also the unofficial trainer for the New Zealand team.

== Medallists ==
Medal	Name	Sport	Event
Bronze	Darcy Hadfield	Rowing	Men's single sculls

== Athletics ==
Two athletes represented New Zealand in the nation's independent Olympic debut in 1920. The two men advanced to the final in two of their three events, placing fourth and fifth.

Athlete	Event	Heats		Quarterfinals		Semifinals		Final	
Athlete	Event	Result	Rank (Note: Ranks given are within each individual heat, quarterfinal or semifinal)	Result	Rank	Result	Rank	Result	Rank
George Davidson	100 m	11.1	2 Q	10.9	3	did not advance			
George Davidson	200 m	22.6	1 Q	22.8	1 Q	22.5	3 Q	22.3	5
Harry Wilson	110 m hurdles	—N/a		15.8	2 Q	15.3	3 Q	15.2	4

== Rowing ==
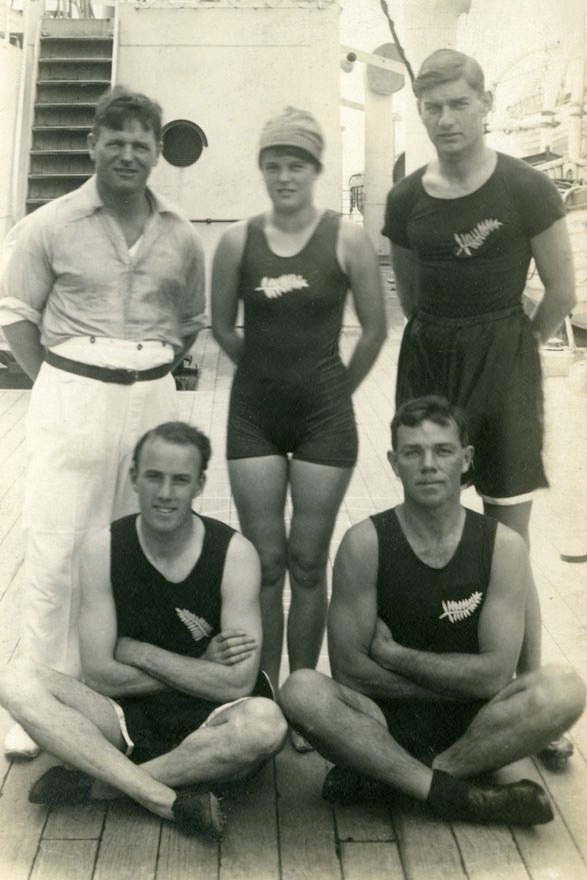
Back row from left: Tui and Violet Walrond, George Davidson; front: Harry Wilson and Darcy Hadfield

A single rower represented New Zealand in 1920. It was the nation's debut in the sport. Hadfield was defeated in the semifinals of the single sculls, but took the bronze medal as the faster losing semifinalist.

Athlete	Event	Quarterfinals		Semifinals		Final	
Athlete	Event	Result	Rank	Result	Rank	Result	Rank
Darcy Hadfield	Single sculls	8:05.0	1 Q	7:49.2	2	Did not race	3rd place, bronze medalist(s)

== Swimming ==
A single swimmer represented New Zealand in 1920. It was the nation's debut in the sport as well as its first independent appearance at the Olympics. Walrond was the first woman from New Zealand to compete in the Olympics.

Swimmer	Event	Semifinals		Final	
Swimmer	Event	Result	Rank (Note: Ranks given are within the semifinal)	Result	Rank
Violet Walrond	Women's 100 m freestyle	1:21.4	3 q	Unknown	5
Violet Walrond	Women's 300 m freestyle	5:04.6	2 Q	Unknown	7
