= František Kiehlmann =

Czech hurdler

Personal information
- Nationality: Czech
- Born: 25 June 1901 Prague, Czechoslovakia
- Died: 20 May 1988 (aged 86) Prague, Czechoslovakia

Sport
- Sport: Track and field
- Event: 400 metres hurdles

František Kiehlmann (5 June 1901 – 20 May 1988) was a Czech hurdler. He competed in the men's 400 metres hurdles at the 1920 Summer Olympics.
