= Harry Wilson (hurdler) =

New Zealand hurdler

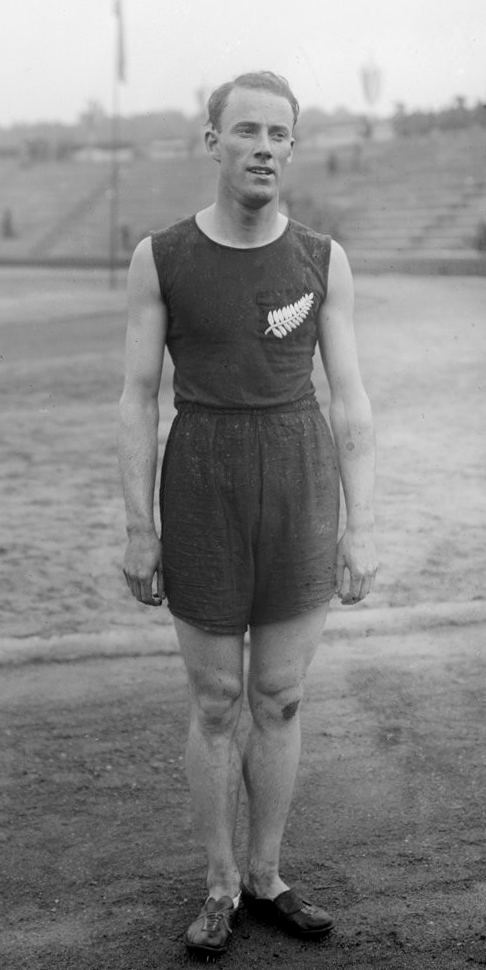
- Wilson in 1919

Personal information
- Born: Harry Ernest Wilson; 28 May 1896 Wellington, New Zealand
- Died: 11 August 1979 (aged 83)
- Height: 1.80 m (5 ft 11 in)
- Weight: 76 kg (168 lb)
- Spouse: Sybil Elizabeth Hippsley (m. 1920)

Sport
- Sport: Athletics
- Events: 110, 400 m hurdles, 200 m

Achievements and titles
- National finals: 100 yds champion (1922); 220 yds champion (1922); 120 yds hurdles champion (1920, 1921, 1923); 440 yds hurdles champion (1915, 1920, 1921, 1923)
- Personal bests: 110 mH – 14.8 (1921); 400 mH – 62.5 (1915); 200 m – 22.3 (1921)

Harry Ernest Wilson (28 May 1896 – 11 August 1979) was a New Zealand hurdler who competed at the 1920 Summer Olympics in Antwerp and at the 1919 Inter-Allied Games in Paris. In 1920 he finished fourth in the 110 metre hurdles competition. He was the Olympic flag bearer for New Zealand in 1920.

== Early life and family ==
Wilson was born in Wellington on 28 May 1896, the son of Thomas and Ann Maria Wilson. He was educated at Berhampore School, and then at Wellington College between 1911 and 1912. On 20 September 1920 he married Sybil Elizabeth Hippsley at Wolverton, Buckinghamshire, England, and the couple went on to have four children.

== Military service ==
After the outbreak of World War I, Wilson travelled to England as a civilian and worked on munitions. Between 1917 and 1919, he served with the New Zealand Field Artillery (NZFA) and, after the Armistice, in the Pay Corps in London. During World War II he was a second lieutenant in the New Zealand Territorial Force.

== Athletics ==
In all, Wilson won nine New Zealand national athletics titles between 1915 and 1923: the 100 yards and 220 yards titles in 1922; the 120 yards hurdles in 1920, 1921 and 1923; and the 440 yards hurdles in 1915, 1920, 1921 and 1923.

While serving with the NZFA in France, Wilson competed at a meet at the base in Étaples, winning the 100 yards, 220 yards, 120 yards hurdles, long jump, high jump, and cricket ball throw. In 1919 he was a member of the New Zealand team that competed in the Inter-Allied Games in Paris, and finished third in the 120 yards hurdles behind the Americans Robert Simpson and Fred Kelly. Later in 1919, Wilson won the 120 yards hurdles at the British Army championship meeting at Aldershot, and went on to win the British AAA Championships title over the same distance at the 1919 AAA Championships, held at Stamford Bridge, London.

After winning the 120 yards hurdles at the 1920 Australasian athletics championship, Wilson was one of four members of the New Zealand team at the 1920 Olympics in Antwerp, and was the team's flagbearer. Competing in the 110 m hurdles, Wilson finished fourth in the final, 0.5 m behind the bronze medal winner.

Wilson broke his leg while competing at the Australasian championship meeting at Hobart in 1924.
