= William Hunter (British athlete) =

British hurdler

Personal information
- Nationality: British
- Born: 15 July 1892
- Died: 6 November 1974 (aged 82)

Sport
- Sport: Track and field
- Event: 110 metres hurdles

William Hunter (15 July 1892 – 6 November 1974) was a British hurdler. He competed in the men's 110 metres hurdles at the 1920 Summer Olympics.
