= Eric Dunbar =

British athlete

Personal information
- Nationality: British/Australian
- Born: 8 May 1897 Brisbane, Australia
- Died: 12 September 1946 (aged 49) Melbourne, Australia

Sport
- Sport: Track and field
- Event: 110 metres hurdles
- Club: British Army AC; East Brisbane Harriers

Eric Victor Dunbar (8 May 1897 – 12 September 1946) was a British/Australian hurdler, who competed at the Olympic Games.

== Career ==
Dunbar finished third behind George Trowbridge in the 120 yards hurdles event at the British 1920 AAA Championships.

One month later, he competed at the 1920 Summer Olympics in Antwerp, Belgium. He competed in the men's 110 metres hurdles.
