= Walker Smith (hurdler) =

American hurdler

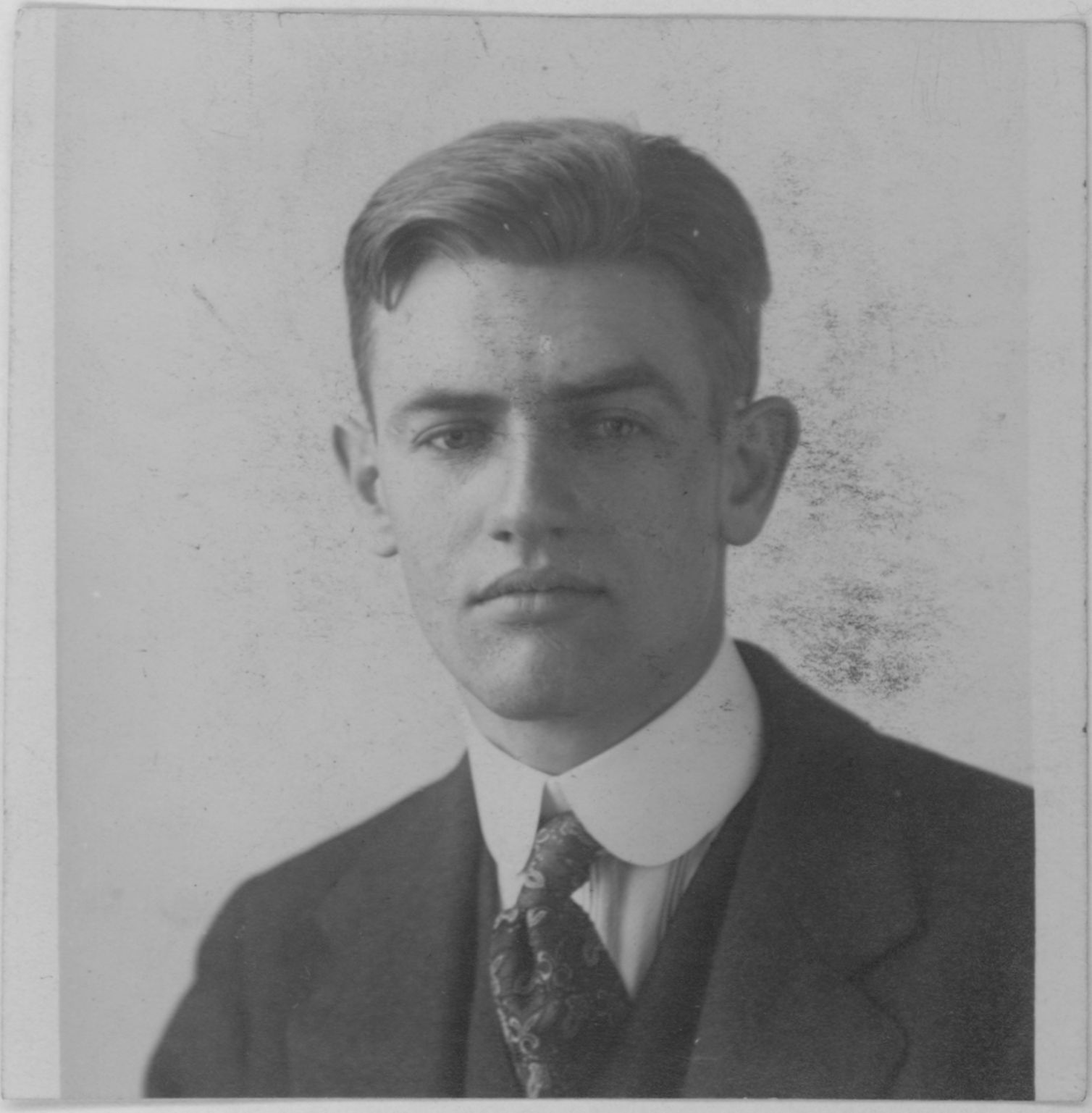

Personal information
- National team: United States
- Born: November 1, 1896 Minneapolis, Minnesota, United States
- Died: February 27, 1993 (aged 96) Orange County, California, United States
- Education: Cornell University
- Height: 5 ft 10.5 in (179 cm)
- Weight: 172 lb (78 kg)

Walker Breeze Smith (November 1, 1896 – February 27, 1993) was an American track and field athlete. Smith attended Cornell University, where he set records in hurdling. He was the IC4A Champion in 1919 in 120 yard high hurdles and 220 yard low hurdles. The year before he placed second in both events.

Smith competed in the men's 110 metres hurdles at the 1920 Summer Olympics. He finished in 5th place. In 1978, Smith was inducted into the Cornell University Hall of Fame.

== Personal life ==
Smith is named after his maternal grandfather, lumber and art magnate T. B. Walker.

When Smith was 10 years old, he had his right eye removed and wore an artificial eye. He was not allowed to play football because of the missing eye, so he took up track & field. As a child, he attended Phillips Exeter Academy. During World War I in 1916, Smith went to France to serve in the American Field Service. Due to his missing eye, he was designated with a 4-F classification and unable to serve in the US army, so he returned to the United States in 1917.

Smith married Marge Billheimer in 1922. Together they had two children, a son and a daughter. They have eight grandchildren as well as eight great-grandchildren.

After retiring from athletics and worked in various jobs, including real estate and investment companies.
