= Edward Wheller =

British hurdler

Personal information
- Nationality: British (English)
- Born: 23 May 1896 Paddington, London, England
- Died: 14 December 1968 (aged 72) Westminster, London, England

Sport
- Sport: Track and field
- Event: 400 metres hurdles
- Club: Surrey AC

Edward William Wheller (23 May 1896 – 14 December 1968) was a British hurdler, who competed at the Olympic Games.

== Career ==
Wheller became the National 440 yard hurdles champion after winning the AAA Championships title at the 1920 AAA Championships.

One month later, he competed at the 1920 Summer Olympics in Antwerp, Belgium. He competed in the men's 400 metres hurdles.
