= Harold Barron =

American sprinter (1894–1978)

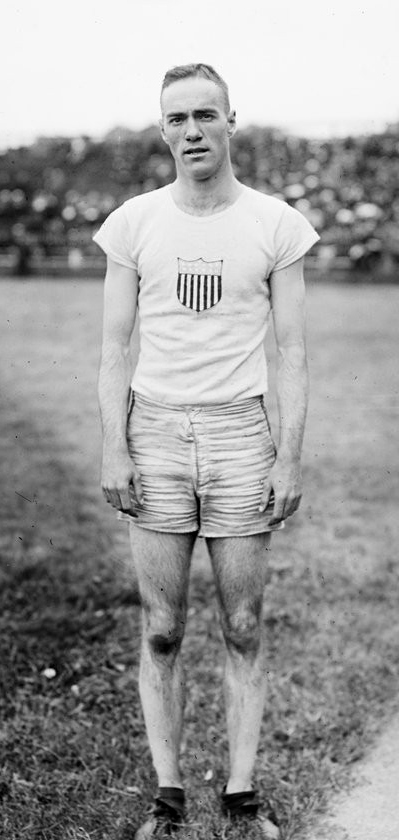
- Harold Barron at the 1920 Olympics

Personal information
- Born: August 29, 1894 Berwyn, Pennsylvania, United States
- Died: October 5, 1978 (aged 84) San Francisco, United States
- Education: Pennsylvania State University
- Height: 1.83 m (6 ft 0 in)
- Weight: 64 kg (141 lb)

Sport
- Sport: Athletics
- Event: 110 m hurdles
- Club: Meadowbrook Club, Philadelphia

Achievements and titles
- Personal best: 120 ydH – 15.0 (1917)
Medal record
Men's athletics
Representing the United States
Olympic Games
Silver medal – second place	1920 Antwerp	110 m hurdles

Harold Earl Barron (August 29, 1894 – October 5, 1978) was an American sprinter. He specialized in the 110 m hurdles, in which he won a silver medal at the 1920 Summer Olympics.

Nationally, Barron won the AAU hurdles title in 1917 and 1920 and the NCAA title in 1922. After graduating from Pennsylvania State University, he worked as an athletics coach at Mercersburg Academy, then Cascadilla School in New York, and finally at Georgia Institute of Technology.

In 1930, Barron, along with Earl Thomson and Harry Hillman, was involved in designing a new, safer hurdle to reduce the risk of serious falls and injuries.

He was born in Berwyn, Pennsylvania and died in San Francisco, California. He and Ann Morgan Barron had one son.

== See also ==
- List of Pennsylvania State University Olympians
