= Gösta Bladin =

Swedish track and field athlete

Johan Axel Gösta Bladin (26 November 1894 – 4 August 1972) was a Swedish track and field athlete who competed in the 1920 Summer Olympics. In 1920, he finished ninth in the long jump competition. He also participated in the 400 metre hurdles event where he was eliminated in the semi-finals.
