= Antoine Jarrety =

French hurdler

Personal information
- Nationality: French
- Born: 2 August 1898 Le Lonzac (Corrèze)
- Died: 7 November 1977 (aged 79) Chartres (Eure-et-Loir)

Sport
- Sport: Track and field
- Event: 400 metres hurdles

Antonin Jarrety (2 August 1898 – 7 November 1977) was a French hurdler. He competed in the men's 400 metres hurdles at the 1920 Summer Olympics.
