= Violet Walrond =

New Zealand swimmer

Violet Robb
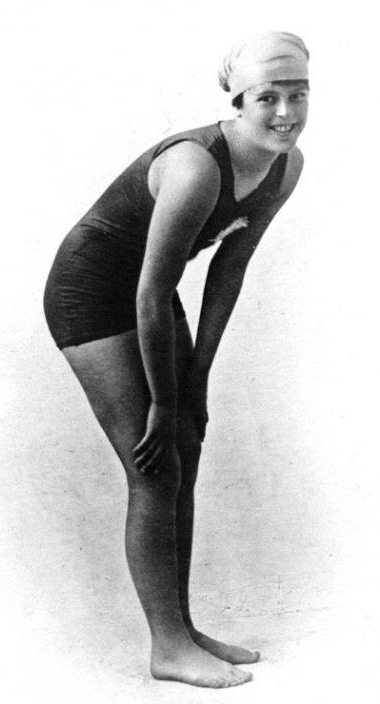
- Violet Walrond in 1920

Personal information
- Born: Violet Ethel Mary Walrond; 27 February 1905 Auckland, New Zealand
- Died: 17 December 1996 (aged 91) Papakura, New Zealand
- Height: 1.65 m (5 ft 5 in)
- Spouse: Harold Robb (m. 1933)
- Relative: Emma Maria Walrond (grandmother)

Sport
- Sport: Swimming

Achievements and titles
- National finals: 100 yds freestyle champion (1920, 1923)

Violet Ethel Mary Robb (née Walrond) (27 February 1905 – 17 December 1996) was a New Zealand swimmer who represented New Zealand at the 1920 Summer Olympics at Antwerp. She was New Zealand's first female Olympic athlete.

== Biography ==
Walrond was one of a team of four New Zealand athletes who competed at the 1920 Summer Olympics. At the age of 15 years, 178 days, she was the youngest swimming competitor at the Games. Walrond competed in two events at the Olympics. In the 100 metre freestyle race, she came fifth in the final (untimed) after placing third in her heat with a time of 1:21.4. In the 300 metre freestyle race, she came in seventh (although New Zealand newspapers said she was sixth, and some publications said she did not start due to illness) in the final (untimed) after finishing second in her heat in 5:04.6. This was the only Olympics to have had a 300 metres women's freestyle race as it was replaced in 1924 by the 400 metres freestyle. She used the crawl style.

Walrond's father, Cecil 'Tui' Walrond, was also a swimmer. He accompanied her to the Olympics as chaperone and unofficial team trainer.

Walrond and her younger sister Edna retired from competitive swimming in 1923 when Walrond was 18. She later stated that they retired on orders from their father, as he felt that we were too much in the public eye. He also forbade them from cutting their long hair short.

She married Harold Robb in 1933, and died in 1996 aged 91, in Papakura, Auckland. She was honoured in a ceremony in Wellington on 9 December 2020 where her family was presented with a pin in commemoration of her status as the first female Olympian to represent Aotearoa/New Zealand.

Walrond was cremated and her ashes scattered at Purewa Cemetery and Crematorium. She has an entry in the Book of Remembrance, showcased on the date of her death in the All Saints Chapel.
