= Adolf Reich =

Czech athlete

Personal information
- Nationality: Czech
- Born: 15 November 1901
- Died: 1944

Sport
- Country: Czechoslovakia
- Sport: Track and field
- Event: 110 metres hurdles

Adolf Reich (15 November 1901 – 1944) was a Czech hurdler. He competed for Czechoslovakia in the men's 110 metres hurdles at the 1920 Summer Olympics.
