= August Desch =

American hurdler (1898–1964)

Olympic medal record

Men's athletics

Representing the United States
Bronze medal – third place	1920 Antwerp	400 metre hurdles

August George "Gus" Desch (December 12, 1898 – November 1964) was an American track and field athlete who competed mainly in the 400 metre hurdles. He was born in Newark, New Jersey and died in Evanston, Illinois.

Desch competed for the United States at the 1920 Summer Olympics in Antwerp, Belgium, in the 400 metre hurdles, where he won the bronze medal. Desch also played half back for Knute Rockne at the University of Notre Dame. He won Notre Dame's first-ever track title when he won the 220-yard low hurdles at the 1921 Outdoor NCAA Track Championships.
