= Albert Pike Lucas =

American painter

Albert Pike Lucas (1862–1945) was an American landscape, figure, and portrait painter; also a sculptor. He was born in Jersey City, and studied at the École des Beaux-Arts (1882–1888) in Paris under Hébert and Boulanger and later under Gustave Courtois and Pascal Dagnan-Bouveret. During his years in Paris, he regularly exhibited at the Paris Salon.

At the Salon of 1896 he won a medal. After a sojourn in Italy he settled in New York in 1902.

His painting is distinctly personal, with the lyric note predominant, and shows sympathetic intimacy with nature, especially in her larger and more mysterious aspects. His handling is broad yet conscientious, his color scheme rich and glowing, and he excels in the management of diffused light, as seen most strikingly in his well-known "Golden Madonna." He painted by preference nocturnes and twilight scenes, such as "October Breezes" (National Gallery, of Art, Washington), "The Little Church on the Hill," and "Walking against the Wind." He also painted portraits of many prominent persons. A good specimen of his work as a sculptor is the statuette "Ecstasy," in the Metropolitan Museum, New York.

He died on May 2, 1945, at his home in Manhattan at the age of 83.
