= Omer Smet =

Belgian sprinter

Personal information
- Nationality: Belgian
- Born: 13 December 1890
- Died: 12 July 1984 (aged 93)

Sport
- Sport: Sprinting
- Event: 4 × 100 metres relay

Omer Smet (13 December 1890 – 12 July 1984) was a Belgian sprinter. He competed in the men's 4 × 100 metres relay at the 1920 Summer Olympics.
