= Harold Jeppe =

South African hurdler (1899–1975)

Personal information
- Nationality: South African
- Born: Harold Painton Jeppe; 24 January 1899 Johannesburg, South Africa
- Died: 4 March 1975 (aged 76) Johannesburg

Sport
- Sport: Track and field
- Event: 110 metres hurdles

Harold Painton Jeppe (24 January 1899 – 4 March 1975) was a South African businessman, art collector and Olympian hurdler.

== Biography ==
Harold Jeppe was one of six children of the South African mining and property magnate Sir Julius Jeppe (after whom the Johannesburg suburb Jeppestown is named) and his wife, Grace Cowen. Harold lived at the family home, Friedenheim, in Belgravia, Johannesburg, but his mother died when he was five and he was sent to The Grange Preparatory School in Crowborough, England. He returned to South Africa to attend St. Andrew's College, Grahamstown, where he was Head Boy and Victor Ludorum. He then went back to England to study at Trinity College, Oxford, where he took part in a track and field competitions, including the 1920 Oxford-Princeton track meet at Queen's Club in London. The same year Jeppe ran in the 110 metres hurdles at the 1920 Summer Olympics in Antwerp. He finished in third place in his heat; only the top two athletes progressed to the semi-finals.

Jeppe graduated from Oxford in 1921 and returned to Johannesburg. He went to work for his father's company, the South African Townships, Mining & Finance Corporation, becoming Managing Director in 1934. That year, Jeppe also co-founded Johannesburg's Inanda Polo Club.

After retiring from corporate life, Jeppe worked in the arts. In 1963, he published his book South African Artists 1900–1962. He managed the Lidchi Art Gallery in Johannesburg from 1963 until 1972 and, through 1973, the Goodman Gallery, where he exhibited his considerable collection of Spanish art. He also became known as a broadcaster, hosting arts-related radio shows from 1963 to 1973.

In 1925, Jeppe married Cicely Marais; they had three daughters and divorced in 1940. In 1941, he married Kathe (Zühl) Colsen; they divorced in 1948. That year, he married Veronica (Mason) Shaw and they remained married until his death, of heart failure, in 1975.
