= Earl Thomson =

Canadian hurdler (1895–1971)

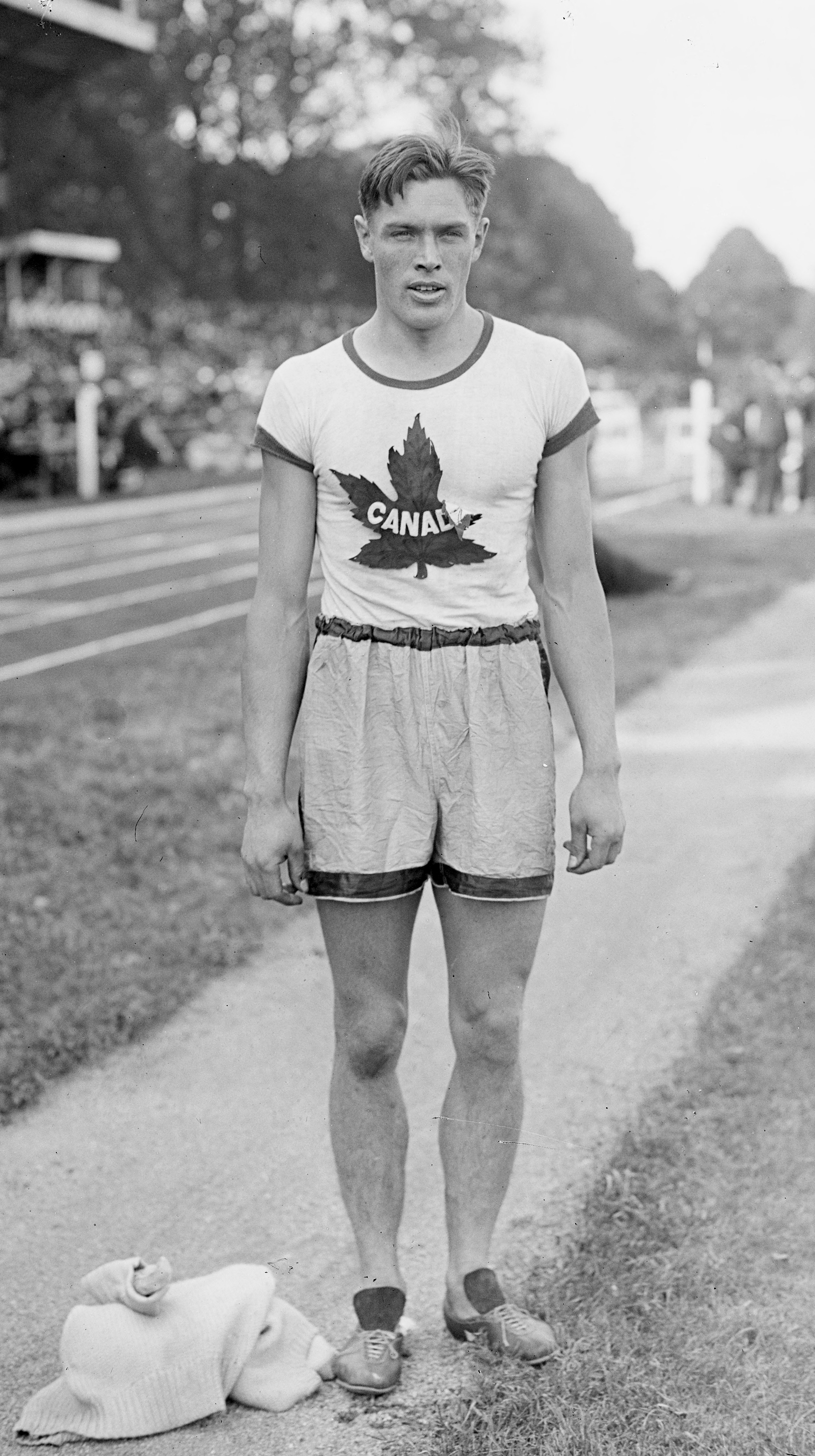
- Thomson in 1920

Personal information
- Full name: Earl John Thomson
- Nickname: "Tommy"
- Born: February 15, 1895 Birch Hills, Northwest Territories, Canada
- Died: May 19, 1971 (aged 76) Oceanside, California, United States
- Height: 6 ft 2 in (188 cm)
- Weight: 190 lb (86 kg)

Sport
- Sport: Athletics
- Events: Hurdles, high jump
- Club: Prince Albert

Achievements and titles
- Personal bests: 110 mH – 14.4 (1920); HJ – 1.803 m (1918)
Medal record
Men's athletics
Representing Canada
Olympic Games
Gold medal – first place	1920 Antwerp	110 m hurdles

Earl John "Tommy" Thomson (February 15, 1895 – May 19, 1971) was a Canadian athlete, a specialist in the high hurdles. In 1920 he became the first Olympic gold medalist in 110 m hurdles from outside the United States.

== Biography ==
Born in Birch Hills, Northwest Territories (now in Saskatchewan), Thomson moved to southern California at age 8, because the warm weather would be better for his mother. Thomson attended Long Beach Poly, where he won the 120 yard hurdles at the first CIF California State Meet in 1915. He also was second in the high jump and fourth in the discus throw. In 1916 he joined the Royal Canadian Air Force, and served there during World War I. He then went to the University of Southern California for one year and then transferred to Dartmouth College. He graduated from there in 1922. In 1918, he had already won the AAU championships in the high hurdles, and in 1920, he set a new world record in the 110 m hurdles, running 14.4. This record would remain unbeaten until 1931, although it was equaled a number of times. He sought to represent the United States at the 1920 Summer Olympics in Antwerp, but was ruled ineligible due to his Canadian citizenship. He then joined the Canadian Olympic team.

At the Olympics, Thomson won a clear victory over his American rivals. The following year, he equaled his own world record, and won the AAU, IC4A and NCAA championships. That year he also won the 220 yard low hurdles. He retired after his third AAU title, in 1922.

Later, Thomson became a track and field coach, coaching the team of the United States Naval Academy in Annapolis, Maryland for 36 years.

In 1930 Thomson, along with Harold Barron and Harry Hillman, was involved in the design of a new safer hurdle, with a view to reducing the danger of bad falls and injuries.

Thomson was an inaugural inductee to Canada's Sports Hall of Fame in 1955. He died of cancer in Oceanside, California aged 76.
