= William Yount =

American hurdler

Personal information
- Born: June 7, 1899 Redlands, California, U.S.
- Died: August 23, 1972 (aged 73) San Bernardino, California, U.S.

Sport
- Sport: Track and field
- Event: 110 metres hurdles

William Yount (June 7, 1899 – August 23, 1972) was an American hurdler. He competed in the men's 110 metres hurdles at the 1920 Summer Olympics.
