= Larry Brown (runner) =

American track and field athlete

Personal information
- National team: United States
- Born: Lawrance Abercromby Brown; September 29, 1898 Seattle, Washington, US
- Died: September 15, 1993 (aged 94) Haverford, Pennsylvania, US
- Education: Wharton School
- Occupation: Investment banker

Sport
- Sport: Track and field
- College team: Penn Quakers

Achievements and titles
- Olympic finals: 1924 Summer Olympics
- Highest world ranking: Record holder for 1000 yards, one-mile relay, two-mile relay, 1600-meter relay, and 500-yard dash.

Lawrance "Larry" Abercromby Brown (September 29, 1898 – September 15, 1993) was an American runner and investment banker. He was a member of the Penn Quakers track team and participated in the 1924 Summer Olympics on behalf of the United States. At one time, he was the world record holder in 1000 yards, one-mile relay, two-mile relay, 1600-meter relay, and 500-yard dash.

== Early life ==
Brown was born in Seattle, Washington on September 29, 1898. He attended the University of Pennsylvania as a tennis player, but soon switched to the Penn Quakers track team. In 1918, he was captain of the freshman track team. His sophomore year, Brown came in second place in the National Junior Championships in the 1000-yard.

During the summer of 1921, Brown broke several world records. At one time, he was the world record holder in 1000 yards, one-mile relay, 1600-meter relay, and 500-yard dash. He was captain of the 1921–22 Penn Quakers track team and was among the top fastest half milers in the world. In the spring of 1922, he set a world record for the two-mile relay.

Brown graduated from the Wharton School at the University of Pennsylvania in 1922. While at Penn, he was a member of Delta Phi fraternity.

== Olympics ==
Brown participated in the 1924 Summer Olympics in Paris, France. He was a member of the United States 4 X 400 men's relay team.

== Career ==
Brown served in the United States National Guard and was stationed with the 28th Division at Camp Atterbury in Indiana.

Brown worked as an investment banker. He retired from banking in 1988.

== Honors ==
Brown is one of three athletes featured in the Penn Athletic Hall of Fame sculpture by R. Tait McKenzie.

== Personal life ==
Brown first married Elizabeth Appel. They had a son and a daughter, Lawrance A. Brown Jr. and Anita Brown. Later, Brown married Esther Larzelere.

Brown was an official for Penn Relays from 1924 to 1965. He continued playing competitive tennis until he was 89 years old.

Brown died on September 15, 1993, at his home in Haverford, Pennsylvania at the age of 95 years.

== See also ==
- Athletics at the 1924 Summer Olympics
