= Charles Daggs =

American hurdler (1901–1976)

Charles Daniel Daggs (April 14, 1901 – February 12, 1976) was an American track and field athlete who competed in the 1920 Summer Olympics.

He was born in Tempe, Arizona, attended Pomona College (graduating in 1923), and died in San Diego, California.

In 1920 he finished sixth in the 400 metre hurdles event.
