= Georg Lindström =

Swedish hurdler

Personal information
- Nationality: Swedish
- Born: 11 June 1898 Grimsby, England
- Died: 14 April 1960 (aged 61) Malmö, Sweden

Sport
- Sport: Track and field
- Event: 110 metres hurdles

Georg Lindström (11 June 1898 – 14 April 1960) was a Swedish hurdler. He competed in the men's 110 metres hurdles at the 1920 Summer Olympics.
