= Göran Hultin =

Swedish athletics competitor

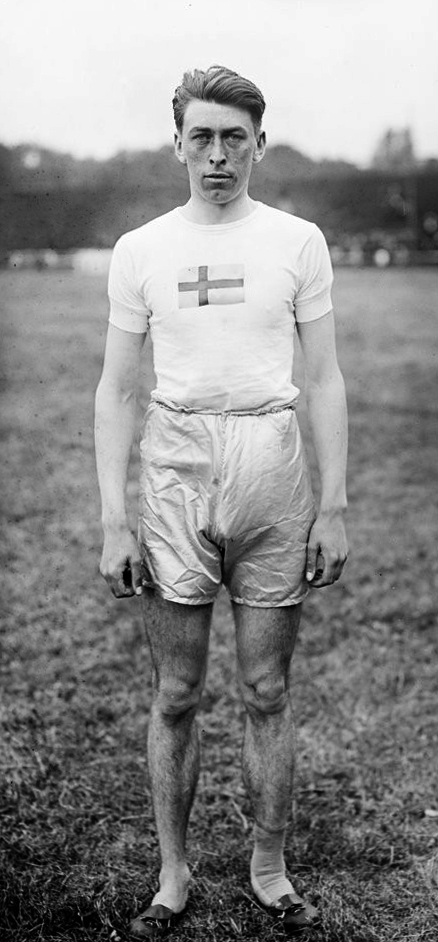
- Göran Hultin in 1916

Personal information
- Born: 15 May 1897 Skog, Sweden
- Died: 12 September 1949 (aged 52) Gävle, Sweden
- Height: 186 cm (6 ft 1 in)
- Weight: 76 kg (168 lb)

Sport
- Sport: Athletics
- Event: Hurdles
- Club: IFK Gävle

Achievements and titles
- Personal best(s): 100 m – 10.9 (1920); 110 mH – 15.3 (1920); 400 mH – 56.4 (1919)

Göran Herman Hultin (15 May 1897 – 12 September 1949) was a Swedish athlete. He competed at the 1920 Summer Olympics in the 110 m hurdles, but failed to reach the final.
