= František Marek (hurdler) =

Czech hurdler

Personal information
- Nationality: Czech
- Born: 20 July 1896 Prague
- Died: 8 April 1961 (aged 64) Prague

Sport
- Sport: Track and field
- Event: 110 metres hurdles

František Marek (20 July 1896 – 8 April 1961) was a Czech hurdler. He competed in the men's 110 metres hurdles at the 1920 Summer Olympics.
