= Albert Lucas (athlete) =

French athletics competitor

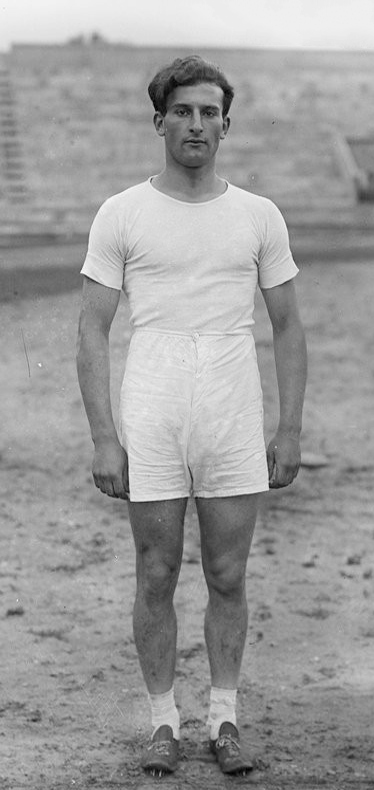
- Lucas in 1920

Personal information
- Born: 4 February 1899 Le Palais, France
- Died: 27 January 1967 (aged 67) Paris, France

Sport
- Sport: Athletics
- Event: Hurdles
- Club: Stade nantais UC, Nantes

Albert Sylvain Charles Lucas (4 February 1899 – 27 January 1967) was a French hurdler. He competed in the 400 m event at the 1920 Summer Olympics, but failed to reach the final.
