= John Norton (athlete) =

American athlete

Olympic medal record

Men's athletics

Representing the United States
Silver medal – second place	1920 Antwerp	400 metre hurdles

John Kelley Norton (April 16, 1893 – December 28, 1979) was an American athlete who competed mainly in the 400 metre hurdles. He was born in Santa Clara, California and died in New York City. Norton competed for the United States at the 1920 Summer Olympics held in Antwerp, Belgium in the 400 metre hurdles where he won the silver medal.
