= Athletics at the 1920 Summer Olympics – Men's 200 metres =

Men's 200 metres at the Games of the VII Olympiad
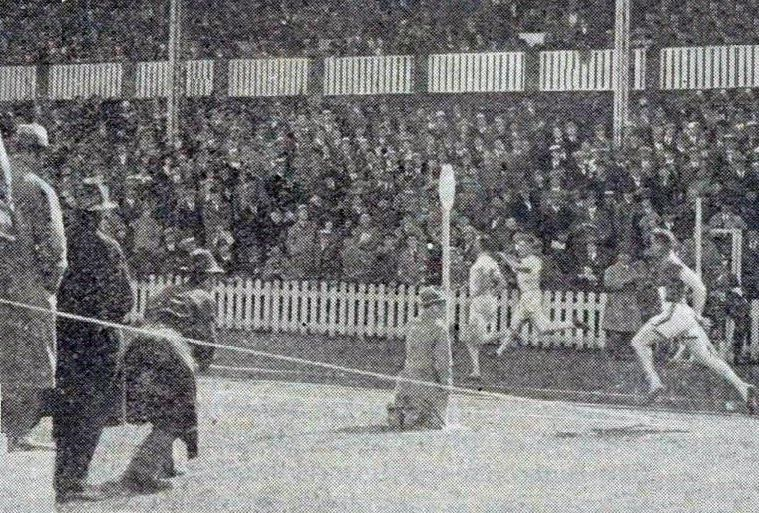
- The finish of the final, with Allen Woodring beating Charley Paddock
- Venue: Olympisch Stadion
- Dates: August 19, 1920 (round 1 & quarterfinals); August 20, 1920 (semifinals & final)
- Competitors: 48 from 22 nations
- Winning time: 22.0

Medalists
| 1st place, gold medalist(s) | | Allen Woodring | United States |
| 2nd place, silver medalist(s) | | Charley Paddock | United States |
| 3rd place, bronze medalist(s) | | Harry Edward | Great Britain |

The men's 200 metres event was part of the track and field athletics programme at the 1920 Summer Olympics. The competition was held on Thursday, August 19, 1920, and on Friday, August 20, 1920. Forty-eight sprinters from 22 nations competed. Nations were limited to 4 athletes each, down from the 12 allowed in previous Games. The event was won by Allen Woodring of the United States, the nation's second consecutive victory in the event and fourth in five Games. Fellow American Charley Paddock took silver. Great Britain reached the podium for a second consecutive Games with Harry Edward's bronze.

== Background ==
This was the fifth appearance of the event, which was not held at the first Olympics in 1896 but has been on the program ever since. None of the finalists from the pre-war 1912 Games returned. The favorite was Charley Paddock, winner of the U.S. trials and the 1919 Inter-Allied Championships. The strongest non-American competitor was Harry Edward of Great Britain, the 1920 AAA champion.

Czechoslovakia, Denmark, Egypt, Estonia, Luxembourg, Monaco, New Zealand, Spain, and Switzerland each made their debut in the event. The United States made its fifth appearance, the only nation to have competed at each edition of the 200 metres to date.

== Competition format ==
The competition expanded to four rounds: heats, quarterfinals, semifinals, and a final. There were 12 heats of between 3 and 5 runners each, with the top 2 men in each advancing to the quarterfinals. The quarterfinals consisted of 5 heats of between 4 and 5 athletes each; the two fastest men in each heat advanced to the semifinals. There were 2 semifinals, each with 5 runners. In that round, the top three athletes advanced. The final had 6 runners.

The race was run on a 390-metre track that was wet and soft.

== Records ==
These were the standing world and Olympic records (in seconds) prior to the 1920 Summer Olympics.

| World record | Willie Applegarth (GBR)^{*} | 21.2 | London, United Kingdom | 4 July 1914 |
| Olympic record | Archie Hahn (USA)^{**} | 21.6 | St. Louis, United States | 31 August 1904 |

^{*} unofficial 220 yards (= 201.17 m)

^{**} straight course

No new world or Olympic records were set during the competition.

== Schedule ==
| Date | Time | Round |
|---|---|---|
| Thursday, 19 August 1920 | 14:00; 16:00 | Round 1 Quarterfinals |
| Friday, 20 August 1920 | 14:45; 16:00 | Semifinals; Final |

== Results ==
Times were generally only published for the winners of each heat. Some of the times listed below are estimates based on contemporary reports of the races.

=== Round 1 ===
==== Heat 1 ====
| Rank | Athlete | Nation | Time | Notes |
|---|---|---|---|---|
| 1 | René Tirard | France | 23.2 | Q |
| 2 | Agne Holmström | Sweden | 23.3 | Q |
| 3 | Diego Ordóñez | Spain | 23.7 | |
| 4 | Shinichi Yamaoka | Japan | 23.9 | |
| 5 | Bjarne Guldager | Norway | | |

==== Heat 2 ====
| Rank | Athlete | Nation | Time | Notes |
|---|---|---|---|---|
| 1 | George Davidson | New Zealand | 22.6 | Q |
| 2 | Alexander Ponton | Canada | 22.8 | Q |
| 3 | Félix Mendizábal | Spain | 23.2 | |
| 4 | Harry van Rappard | Netherlands | 23.7 | |

==== Heat 3 ====
| Rank | Athlete | Nation | Time | Notes |
|---|---|---|---|---|
| 1 | Vojtěch Plzák | Czechoslovakia | 23.4 | Q |
| 2 | William Hill | Great Britain | 23.8 | Q |
| 3 | Marcel Gustin | Belgium | 24.3 | |

==== Heat 4 ====
| Rank | Athlete | Nation | Time | Notes |
|---|---|---|---|---|
| 1 | Paul Brochart | Belgium | 23.2 | Q |
| 2 | William Hunt | Australia | 23.5 | Q |
| 3 | Giovanni Orlandi | Italy | 23.8 | |
| 4 | Paul Hammer | Luxembourg | 24.0 | |
| 5 | Federico Reparez | Spain | | |

==== Heat 5 ====
| Rank | Athlete | Nation | Time | Notes |
|---|---|---|---|---|
| 1 | Robert Caste | France | 23.0 | Q |
| 2 | Harold Abrahams | Great Britain | 23.3 | Q |
| 3 | Willie Bukes | South Africa | 23.4 | |
| 4 | Rolf Stenersen | Norway | 23.8 | |

==== Heat 6 ====
| Rank | Athlete | Nation | Time | Notes |
|---|---|---|---|---|
| 1 | Charley Paddock | United States | 23.2 | Q |
| 2 | August Sørensen | Denmark | 23.8 | Q |
| 3 | Victor d'Arcy | Great Britain | 24.0 | |
| 4 | Ahmed Khairy | Egypt | | |

==== Heat 7 ====
| Rank | Athlete | Nation | Time | Notes |
|---|---|---|---|---|
| 1 | Sven Krokström | Sweden | 23.8 | Q |
| 2 | Max Houben | Belgium | 24.2 | Q |
| 3 | Dimitrios Karambatis | Greece | 24.2 | |

==== Heat 8 ====
| Rank | Athlete | Nation | Time | Notes |
|---|---|---|---|---|
| 1 | Loren Murchison | United States | 23.2 | Q |
| 2 | Nils Sandström | Sweden | 23.6 | Q |
| 3 | Carlos Pajarón | Spain | 24.2 | |
| 4 | August Waibel | Switzerland | | |

==== Heat 9 ====
| Rank | Athlete | Nation | Time | Notes |
|---|---|---|---|---|
| 1 | Allen Woodring | United States | 22.8 | Q |
| 2 | Cor Wezepoel | Netherlands | 23.3 | Q |
| 3 | Francis Irvine | South Africa | 23.3 | |
| 4 | Ichiro Kaga | Japan | | |
| 5 | Edmond Médécin | Monaco | | |

==== Heat 10 ====
| Rank | Athlete | Nation | Time | Notes |
|---|---|---|---|---|
| 1 | Harry Edward | Great Britain | 22.8 | Q |
| 2 | Jack Oosterlaak | South Africa | 23.2 | Q |
| 3 | Sven Malm | Sweden | 23.3 | |
| 4 | Mario Riccobono | Italy | | |
| 5 | Reinhold Saulmann | Estonia | 25.4 | |

==== Heat 11 ====
| Rank | Athlete | Nation | Time | Notes |
|---|---|---|---|---|
| 1 | René Lorain | France | 25.0 | Q |
| 2 | Albert Heijnneman | Netherlands | 25.4 | Q |
| 3 | Cyril Coaffee | Canada | | |

==== Heat 12 ====
| Rank | Athlete | Nation | Time | Notes |
|---|---|---|---|---|
| 1 | Morris Kirksey | United States | 23.4 | Q |
| 2 | Josef Imbach | Switzerland | 23.5 | Q |
| 3 | Jean-René Seurin | France | 23.6 | |

=== Quarterfinals ===
==== Quarterfinal 1 ====
| Rank | Athlete | Nation | Time | Notes |
|---|---|---|---|---|
| 1 | Loren Murchison | United States | 22.8 | Q |
| 2 | Josef Imbach | Switzerland | 23.1 | Q |
| 3 | René Tirard | France | 23.2 | |
| 4 | August Sørensen | Denmark | | |

==== Quarterfinal 2 ====
| Rank | Athlete | Nation | Time | Notes |
|---|---|---|---|---|
| 1 | Harry Edward | Great Britain | 22.0 | Q |
| 2 | Allen Woodring | United States | 22.1 | Q |
| 3 | Robert Caste | France | 22.2 | |
| 4 | William Hunt | Australia | 22.4 | |
| 5 | Agne Holmström | Sweden | 22.5 | |

==== Quarterfinal 3 ====
| Rank | Athlete | Nation | Time | Notes |
|---|---|---|---|---|
| 1 | George Davidson | New Zealand | 22.8 | Q |
| 2 | Charley Paddock | United States | 22.9 | Q |
| 3 | René Lorain | France | 23.0 | |
| 4 | Nils Sandström | Sweden | 23.3 | |
| 5 | Max Houben | Belgium | | |

==== Quarterfinal 4 ====
| Rank | Athlete | Nation | Time | Notes |
|---|---|---|---|---|
| 1 | Morris Kirksey | United States | 22.6 | Q |
| 2 | Alexander Ponton | Canada | 22.7 | Q |
| 3 | Harold Abrahams | Great Britain | 23.0 | |
| 4 | Vojtěch Plzák | Czechoslovakia | 23.1 | |
| 5 | Cor Wezepoel | Netherlands | 23.3 | |

==== Quarterfinal 5 ====
| Rank | Athlete | Nation | Time | Notes |
|---|---|---|---|---|
| 1 | Jack Oosterlaak | South Africa | 23.0 | Q |
| 2 | Paul Brochart | Belgium | 23.2 | Q |
| 3 | William Hill | Great Britain | 23.2 | |
| 4 | Sven Krokström | Sweden | 23.3 | |
| — | Albert Heijnneman | Netherlands | DNF | |

=== Semifinals ===
==== Semifinal 1 ====
| Rank | Athlete | Nation | Time | Notes |
|---|---|---|---|---|
| 1 | Loren Murchison | United States | 22.4 | Q |
| 2 | Harry Edward | Great Britain | 22.5 | Q |
| 3 | George Davidson | New Zealand | 22.5 | Q |
| 4 | Morris Kirksey | United States | 22.5 | |
| — | Paul Brochert | Belgium | DNS | |

==== Semifinal 2 ====
| Rank | Athlete | Nation | Time | Notes |
|---|---|---|---|---|
| 1 | Allen Woodring | United States | 22.4 | Q |
| 2 | Charley Paddock | United States | 22.5 | Q |
| 3 | Jack Oosterlaak | South Africa | 22.7 | Q |
| 4 | Alexandre Penton | Canada | 22.9 | |
| — | Josef Imbach | Switzerland | DNF | |

=== Final ===
| Rank | Lane | Athlete | Nation | Time |
|---|---|---|---|---|
| 1st place, gold medalist(s) | 3 | Allen Woodring | United States | 22.0 |
| 2nd place, silver medalist(s) | 4 | Charley Paddock | United States | 22.0 |
| 3rd place, bronze medalist(s) | 5 | Harry Edward | Great Britain | 22.2 |
| 4 | 6 | Loren Murchison | United States | 22.2 |
| 5 | 1 | George Davidson | New Zealand | 22.3 |
| 6 | 2 | Jack Oosterlaak | South Africa | 22.3 |
