= Athletics at the 1920 Summer Olympics – Men's 4 × 100 metres relay =

Men's 4 × 100 metres relay at the Games of the VII Olympiad
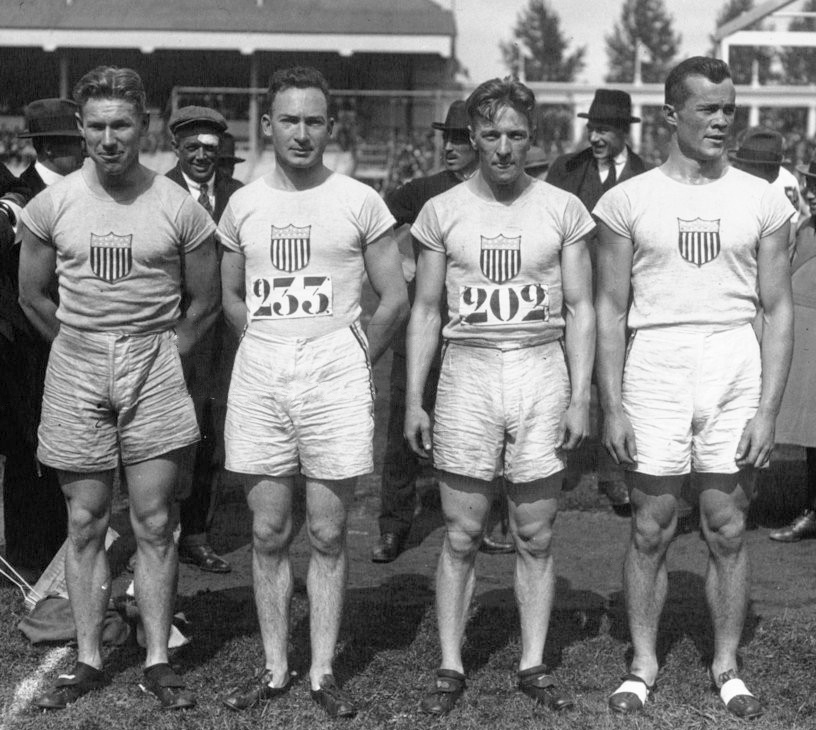
- The U.S. team, left-right:Paddock, Scholz, Murchison and Kirskey
- Venue: Olympisch Stadion
- Dates: August 21–22, 1920
- Competitors: 52 from 13 nations

Medalists
1st place, gold medalist(s)		Morris Kirksey, Loren Murchison, Charley Paddock, Jackson Scholz; United States
2nd place, silver medalist(s)		Émile Ali-Khan, René Lorain, René Mourlon, René Tirard; France
3rd place, bronze medalist(s)		Agne Holmström, Sven Malm, William Petersson, Nils Sandström; Sweden

Official Video

The men's 4 × 100 metres relay event was part of the track and field athletics programme at the 1920 Summer Olympics. It was the second appearance of this event. The competition was held on Saturday, August 21, 1920, and on Sunday, August 22, 1920. Fifty-two runners from 13 nations competed.

== Records ==
These were the standing world and Olympic records (in seconds) prior to the 1920 Summer Olympics.

World record	42.3	(Germany) Otto Röhr (Germany) Max Herrmann (Germany) Erwin Kern (Germany) Richard Rau	Stockholm (SWE)	July 8, 1912
Olympic record	42.3	(Germany) Otto Röhr (Germany) Max Herrmann (Germany) Erwin Kern (Germany) Richard Rau	Stockholm (SWE)	July 8, 1912

In the final the team of the United States set a new world record with 42.2 seconds.

== Results ==
=== Semifinals ===
The semi-finals were held on Saturday, August 21, 1920.

Semifinal 1

Place	Athletes	Time	Qual.
1	Charley Paddock, Jackson Scholz, Loren Murchison, Morris Kirksey (USA)	43.0	Q
2	Jean Colbach, Paul Hammer, Jean Proess, Alex Servais (LUX)	44.4	Q
3	Félix Mendizábal, Diego Ordóñez, Carlos Botín, Federico Reparez (ESP)	44.6	
—	Bjarne Guldager, Asle Bækkedal, Rolf Stenersen, Erling Aastad (NOR)	DSQ	
—	Vittorio Zucca, Giovanni Orlandi, Giorgio Croci, Mario Riccobono (ITA)	DSQ	

Semifinal 2

Place	Athletes	Time	Qual.
1	René Lorain, René Tirard, René Mourlon, Émile Ali-Khan (FRA)	43.0	Q
2	William Hill, Harold Abrahams, Denis Black, Victor d'Arcy (GBR)	43.3	Q
3	Albert Heijnneman, Jan de Vries, Harry van Rappard, Cor Wezepoel (NED)	43.5	
4	Max Houben, Julien Lehouck, Omer Smet, Paul Brochart (BEL)	43.7	

Semifinal 3

Place	Athletes	Time	Qual.
1	Agne Holmström, William Petersson, Sven Malm, Nils Sandström (SWE)	43.4	Q
2	Henri Thorsen, Fritiof Andersen, August Sørensen, Marinus Sørensen (DEN)	43.8	Q
3	Jack Oosterlaak, Willie Bukes, Henry Dafel, Francis Irvine (RSA)	44.4	
4	August Waibel, Walter Leibundgut, Adolf Rysler, Josef Imbach (SUI)	44.2	

=== Final ===
The final was held on Sunday, August 22, 1920.

Place	Athletes	Time
1	Charley Paddock, Jackson Scholz, Loren Murchison, Morris Kirksey (USA)	42.2 WR
2	René Lorain, René Tirard, René Mourlon, Émile Ali-Khan (FRA)	42.5
3	Agne Holmström, William Petersson, Sven Malm, Nils Sandström (SWE)	42.8
4	William Hill, Harold Abrahams, Denis Black, Victor d'Arcy (GBR)	43.0
5	Henri Thorsen, Fritiof Andersen, August Sørensen, Marinus Sørensen (DEN)	43.3
6	Jean Colbach, Paul Hammer, Jean Proess, Alex Servais (LUX)	43.6
