= Athletics at the 1920 Summer Olympics – Men's 100 metres =

Men's 100 metres at the Games of the VII Olympiad
- Venue: Olympisch Stadion
- Dates: August 15 (round 1 & quarterfinals); August 16 (semifinals & final)
- Competitors: 60 from 22 nations
- Winning time: 10.8

Medalists
1st place, gold medalist(s)		Charley Paddock	United States
2nd place, silver medalist(s)		Morris Kirksey	United States
3rd place, bronze medalist(s)		Harry Edward	Great Britain

The men's 100 metres event was part of the athletics programme at the 1920 Summer Olympics. The competition was held on August 15 and 16, 1920. The event was won by Charley Paddock of the United States. Great Britain won its first medal in the event, a bronze by Harry Edward.

Sixty sprinters from 22 nations competed, while Estonia's sole athlete in the event, Reinhold Saulmann, was entered but did not start the 100 m. No nation had more than 4 runners, suggesting the limit had been reduced from the 12 maximum in force in 1908 and 1912.

== Background ==
This was the sixth time the event was held, having appeared at every Olympics since the first in 1896. None of the 1912 medalists returned in 1920. Notable entrants included Charley Paddock of the United States, the 1919 Inter-Allied Championship winner and Olympic favorite; fellow American Loren Murchison, who had defeated Paddock in the U.S. Olympic trials; and Harry Edward of Great Britain, the 1920 AAA Championships winner.

Egypt, Luxembourg, Monaco, New Zealand, Spain, and Switzerland were represented in the event for the first time. The new nation of Czechoslovakia also appeared for the first time, though Bohemia had previously competed separately. For the first time, Hungary did not compete (a result of not being invited after World War I)—making the United States the only nation to have appeared at each of the first six Olympic men's 100 metres events.

== Competition format ==
The event expanded from three rounds (in 1908 and 1912) to four rounds: heats, quarterfinals, semifinals, and a final. There were 12 heats, of 4–6 athletes each, with the top 2 in each heat advancing to the quarterfinals. The 24 quarterfinalists were placed into 5 heats of 4 or 5 athletes. Again, the top 2 advanced. There were 2 heats of 5 semifinalists, this time with the top 3 advancing to the 6-man final.

== Records ==
These were the standing world and Olympic records (in seconds) prior to the 1920 Summer Olympics.

World record	10.6(*)	Donald Lippincott (USA)	Stockholm (SWE)	July 6, 1912
Olympic record	10.6	Donald Lippincott (USA)	Stockholm (SWE)	July 6, 1912

(*) This was the only officially ratified world record in 1920, but there have been at least four runs in 10.5 seconds at that time. (see the records prior the 1912 Summer Olympics.)

== Schedule ==
Date	Time	
Sunday, 15 August 1920	15:15; 17:00	Round 1 Quarterfinals
Monday, 16 August 1920	9:30; 16:00	Semifinals; Final

== Results ==
Times were generally only published for the winners of each heat. Some of the times listed below are estimates based on contemporary reports of the races.

=== Round 1 ===
==== Heat 1 ====
Rank	Athlete	Nation	Time	Notes
1	William Hill	Great Britain	11.0	Q
2	Mario Riccoboni	Italy	11.2	Q
3	Marcel Gustin	Belgium	11.3	
4	Jan de Vries	Netherlands		
5	Ichiro Kaga	Japan		
6	Paul Hammer	Luxembourg		

==== Heat 2 ====
Rank	Athlete	Nation	Time	Notes
1	René Mourlon	France	11.2	Q
2	August Sørensen	Denmark	11.3	Q
3	Erik Lindvall	Sweden		
4	Ahmed Khairy	Egypt		
5	Purma Bannerjee	India		
–	František Skokan	Czechoslovakia	DNS	

==== Heat 3 ====
Rank	Athlete	Nation	Time	Notes
1	Loren Murchison	United States	10.8	Q
2	Jacobus Bukes	South Africa	11.0	Q
3	Albert Heijnneman	Netherlands	11.0	
4	Vojtěch Plzák	Czechoslovakia		

==== Heat 4 ====
Rank	Athlete	Nation	Time	Notes
1	William Hunt	Australia	11.0	Q
2	Félix Mendizábal	Spain	11.2	Q
3	Francis Irvine	South Africa		
4	Bjarne Guldager	Norway		
5	Adolf Rysler	Switzerland		
6	Nils Sandström	Sweden		

==== Heat 5 ====
Rank	Athlete	Nation	Time	Notes
1	Vittorio Zucca	Italy	11.4	Q
2	Cor Wezepoel	Netherlands	11.5	Q
3	Leonard Dixon	South Africa		
4	August Waibel	Switzerland		
5	Alex Servais	Luxembourg		

==== Heat 6 ====
Rank	Athlete	Nation	Time	Notes
1	Morris Kirksey	United States	11.0	Q
2	Josef Imbach	Switzerland	11.0	Q
3	René Lorain	France	11.1	
4	Johan Johnsen	Norway	11.2	
5	Jaime Camps	Spain		
6	Giovanni Orlandi	Italy		

==== Heat 7 ====
Rank	Athlete	Nation	Time	Notes
1	Paul Brochart	Belgium	11.4	Q
2	René Tirard	France	11.7	Q
3	Diego Ordóñez	Spain		
4	Eduard Hašek	Czechoslovakia		
5	Jean Colbach	Luxembourg		

==== Heat 8 ====
Rank	Athlete	Nation	Time	Notes
1	Charley Paddock	United States	10.8	Q
2	Harry Edward	Great Britain	10.9	Q
3	Carlos Botín	Spain	11.6	
4	Shinichi Yamaoka	Japan	11.6	
5	Edmond Médécin	Monaco	11.8	

==== Heat 9 ====
Rank	Athlete	Nation	Time	Notes
1	Émile Ali-Khan	France	11.0	Q
2	Victor d'Arcy	Great Britain	11.1	Q
3	Rolf Stenersen	Norway		
4	Dimitrios Karabatis	Greece		
5	Sven Malm	Sweden		

==== Heat 10 ====
Rank	Athlete	Nation	Time	Notes
1	Harold Abrahams	Great Britain	11.0	Q
2	Alexander Ponton	Canada	11.1	Q
3	Giorgio Croci	Italy	11.3	
4	Harry van Rappard	Netherlands		
–	Reinhold Saulmann	Estonia	DNS	

==== Heat 11 ====
Rank	Athlete	Nation	Time	Notes
1	Jack Oosterlaak	South Africa	11.0	Q
2	George Davidson	New Zealand	11.1	Q
3	Agne Holmström	Sweden		
4	Fritiof Andersen	Denmark		
5	Jean Lefèbvre	Belgium		

==== Heat 12 ====
Rank	Athlete	Nation	Time	Notes
1	Jackson Scholz	United States	10.8	Q
2	Marinus Sørensen	Denmark	11.2	Q
3	Cyril Coaffee	Canada		
4	Julien Lehouck	Belgium		
5	Asle Bækkedal	Norway		

=== Quarterfinals ===
==== Quarterfinal 1 ====
Rank	Athlete	Nation	Time	Notes
1	Harry Edward	Great Britain	10.8	Q
2	Loren Murchison	United States	10.9	Q
3	René Mourlon	France	11.0	
4	William Hunt	Australia	11.0	
5	Mario Riccobono	Italy	11.5	

==== Quarterfinal 2 ====
Rank	Athlete	Nation	Time	Notes
1	William Hill	Great Britain	11.0	Q
2	Félix Mendizábal	Spain	11.1	Q
3	Willie Bukes	South Africa		
4	August Sørensen	Denmark		
5	Vittorio Zucca	Italy		

==== Quarterfinal 3 ====
Rank	Athlete	Nation	Time	Notes
1	Charley Paddock	United States	10.8	Q
2	Émile Ali-Khan	France	10.9	Q
3	George Davidson	New Zealand	10.9	
4	Harold Abrahams	Great Britain	11.0	
5	Cor Wezepoel	Netherlands		

==== Quarterfinal 4 ====
Rank	Athlete	Nation	Time	Notes
1	Jackson Scholz	United States	10.8	Q
2	Jack Oosterlaak	South Africa	11.0	Q
3	Josef Imbach	Switzerland	11.1	
4	René Tirard	France	11.2	
5	Alexander Ponton	Canada	11.4	

==== Quarterfinal 5 ====
Rank	Athlete	Nation	Time	Notes
1	Morris Kirksey	United States	10.8	Q
2	Paul Brochart	Belgium	10.9	Q
3	Victor d'Arcy	Great Britain		
4	Marinus Sørensen	Denmark		

=== Semifinals ===
==== Semifinal 1 ====
Rank	Athlete	Nation	Time	Notes
1	Harry Edward	Great Britain	10.8	Q
2	Jackson Scholz	United States	10.9	Q
3	Morris Kirksey	United States	11.0	Q
4	Jack Oosterlaak	South Africa	11.0	
5	Félix Mendizábal	Spain		

==== Semifinal 2 ====
Rank	Athlete	Nation	Time	Notes
1	Charley Paddock	United States	11.0	Q
2	Émile Ali-Khan	France	11.1	Q
3	Loren Murchison	United States	11.2	Q
4	Paul Brochart	Belgium	11.3	
5	William Hill	Great Britain	11.3	

=== Final ===
Murchison was affected badly by the start. The starter had told Paddock to adjust his position, causing Murchison to stand, thinking the full start sequence would be repeated. When it was not, Murchison was effectively eliminated as he was unprepared to run and could not catch the group.

Scholz was in the lead at the halfway mark before falling back to the back of the group. Paddock won by half a metre over Kirksey, with Edward a "chest behind" the silver medalist. The finish between Scholz and Ali-Khan for 4th and 5th places was close enough that the judges originally ruled Ali-Khan 4th before determining that Scholz was 4th.

A photograph of the race, featuring Paddock's 'flying finish' leaping to the tape, is one of the most famous in the history of sport.

Rank	Lane	Athlete	Nation	Time
1st place, gold medalist(s)	3	Charley Paddock	United States	10.8
2nd place, silver medalist(s)	1	Morris Kirksey	United States	10.9
3rd place, bronze medalist(s)	6	Harry Edward	Great Britain	10.9
4	5	Jackson Scholz	United States	10.9
5	4	Émile Ali-Khan	France	11.2
6	2	Loren Murchison	United States	11.2
