= Imbach =

Imbach is a surname. Notable people with the surname include:

- Emil J. Imbach (1897–1970) , Swiss botanist and mycologist
- Josef Imbach (athlete) (1894–1964), Swiss sprinter
- Josef Imbach (theologian) (born 1945), Swiss theologian
- Thomas Imbach (born 1962), Swiss film director

== See also ==
- Imsbach, is a municipality in the Donnersbergkreis district, in Rhineland-Palatinate, Germany
