= Josef Imbach =

Josef Imbach may refer to:

- Josef Imbach (athlete) (1894–1964), Swiss sprinter
- Josef Imbach (theologian) (born 1945), Swiss theologian
