= William Hill (British athlete) =

British sprinter

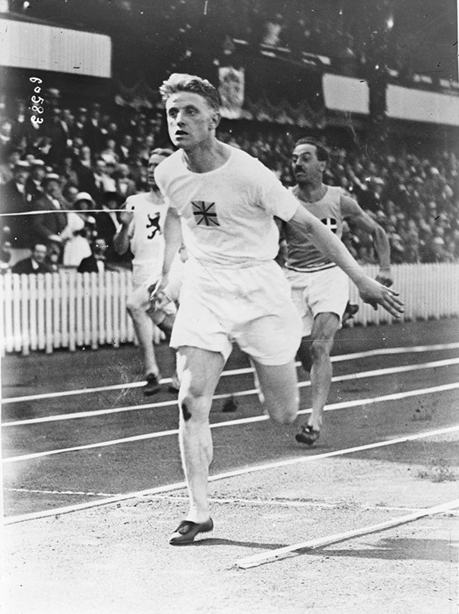

Personal information
- Born: 31 October 1896 Bromley, Greater London, England
- Died: 14 December 1958 (aged 62) Royal Tunbridge Wells, England

Sport
- Sport: Athletics
- Event: Sprints
- Club: Surrey AC

William Arthur Hill (31 October 1896 – 14 December 1958) was a British track and field athlete who competed in the 1920 Summer Olympics.

== Career ==
Hill, born in Bromley, Greater London, became the National 100 yards champion and the National 220 yards champion, after winning the AAA Championships title at the 1919 AAA Championships.

Hill was unable to repeat the success the following year, finishing second and third respectively in the 100 and 220 yards events behind Harry Edward at the 1920 AAA Championships.

The following month at the 1920 Olympic Games held in Antwerp, Belgium, Hill was a member of the British relay team which finish fourth in the 4 × 100 metre relay event. In the 100 metres competition he was eliminated in the semi-finals and in the 200 metres event he was eliminated in the quarter-finals.

He died in Royal Tunbridge Wells.
