= Nine and Three-Fifths Seconds =

1925 film

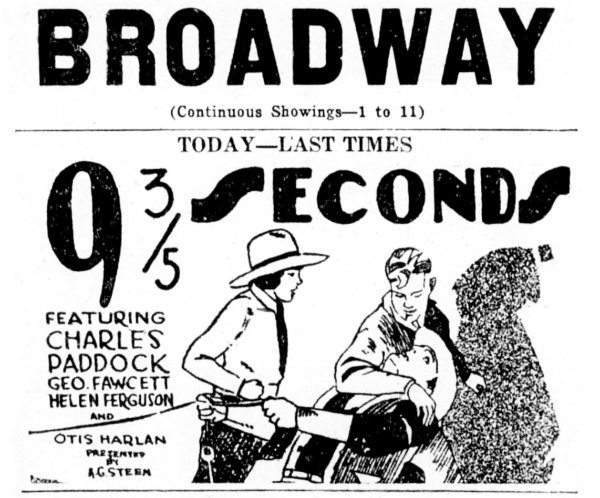
- newspaper ad
- Directed by: Lloyd B. Carleton
- Written by: Roy Clements
- Produced by: A. G. Steen
- Starring: Charles Paddock; Helen Ferguson
- Cinematography: Edward Henderson; Gordon Pollock
- Distributed by: B. A. Goodman Productions (US); Ideal Films (UK, August 1926), as Breaking Records
- Release date: September 1925
- Running time: 5 reels (5600 ft)
- Country: United States
- Language: Silent (English intertitles)

Nine and Three-Fifths Seconds is a 1925 American silent comedy film starring Olympic sprint champion Charley Paddock in his screen debut.

== Cast ==
- Charles Paddock as Charles Raymond
- Helen Ferguson as Mary Bowser
- George Fawcett as Jasper Raymond
- Jack Giddings as Walter Raymond
- Peggy Schaffer as Lucille Pringle
- G. Raymond Nye as Link Edwards
- Otis Harlan as Motherbund
- W. Lawson Butt
- Caroline Putney

== Plot ==
Devoted athlete Charles Raymond (Paddock) is disowned by his wealthy father (Fawcett). An excellent student, Charles discovers a formula useful to his father’s soapmaking business, but his brother (Giddings) steals it, seeking to inherit his father’s fortune. Charles is kicked out of the house, robbed on a freight train, and left with only his running spikes. After a fight on the train, he’s thrown off, dressed in hobo clothes. Mary, the pretty daughter (Ferguson) of a ranch owner takes him in. Charles impresses her father by racing the fastest horse around, beating it in the last 10 yards. When Mary is kidnapped, Charles chases on foot to rescue her. In the climax, he breaks the world sprint record in the Olympics and wins Mary.

== Background ==
Charley Paddock won the 100-meter dash (plus two other sprint medals) at the 1920 Antwerp Olympics. In 1921, newsmen awarded him a new—and unofficial—title: World’s Fastest Human. It enshrined him as one of the big sports celebrities of the 1920s.

But before he was a champion sprinter, he was a teenage dramatist, writing, directing, and acting in school plays at Throop Polytechnic, Pasadena, California.

Meanwhile, neighboring Hollywood grew into the national center of filmmaking. A minor trend, which Paddock wrote about, was the attempt to turn sports stars into film stars, including Babe Ruth, Jack Dempsey, Johnny Weissmuller, Gertrude Ederle, Duke Kahanamoku, etc. With Nine and Three-Fifths Seconds, Paddock resurrected his acting skills and joined the pattern.

The title, Nine and Three-Fifths Seconds, referred to the world record in the 100-yard dash (9.6) tied by Paddock in 1924. In that era, running times were often recorded or cited in fifths of a second.

== Notes ==
The film includes slow motion shots of Paddock running on the track.

Motion Picture News called Paddock “a very pleasing personality and actor of considerable merit for a novice.”
