= Ahmed Khairy =

Ahmed Khairy may refer to:

- Ahmed Khairy (athlete), Egyptian sprinter
- Ahmed Khairy (footballer), Egyptian footballer
- Ahmed Khairy (handballer), Egyptian handball player
