= Allen Woodring =

American sprinter

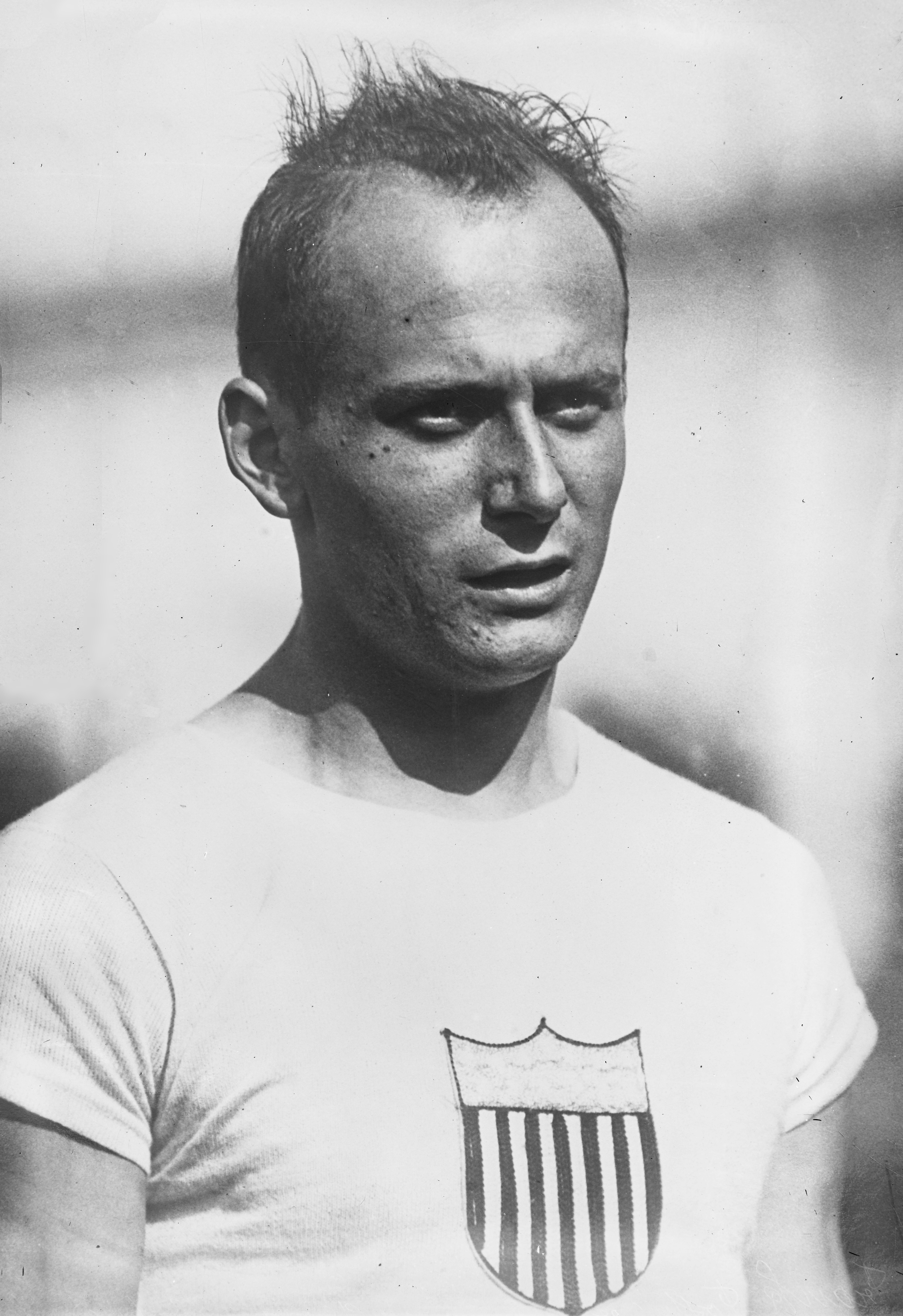
- Allen Woodring at the 1920 Olympics

Personal information
- Born: February 15, 1898 Hellertown, Pennsylvania, U.S.
- Died: November 15, 1982 (aged 84) Clearwater, Florida, U.S.
- Education: Syracuse University
- Height: 1.80 m (5 ft 11 in)
- Weight: 73 kg (161 lb)

Sport
- Sport: Athletics
- Event: 100–400 m
- Club: Meadowbrook Club, Philadelphia

Achievements and titles
- Personal bests: 200 m – 22.0 (1920); 400 m – 47.9 (1923)
Medal record
Representing the United States
Olympic Games
Gold medal – first place	1920 Antwerp	200 m

Allen Woodring (February 15, 1898 – November 15, 1982) was an American sprint runner. At the 1920 United States Olympic trials, he failed to qualify in the 200 meters yet was selected for the national team and won the Olympic gold medal in this event.

Woodring ran for Mercersburg Academy under Jimmy Curran, before competing for the Meadowbrook Club of Philadelphia. He graduated from Syracuse University and later worked as a salesman for the Spalding Company.

After his athletics career ended he worked as a salesman for Sears, Roebuck & Co. In his later years he moved to Florida.
