= Ichiro Kaga =

Japanese sprinter (1898–1946)

Personal information
- Nationality: Japanese
- Born: 10 June 1898 Osaka, Japan
- Died: 5 November 1946 (aged 48)

Sport
- Sport: Sprinting
- Event: 100 metres

Ichiro Kaga (Japanese: 加賀 一郎, Hepburn: Kaga Ichirō; 10 June 1898 – 5 November 1946) was a Japanese sprinter. He competed in the men's 100 metres and men's 200 metres events at the 1920 Summer Olympics. His niece is the actress Mariko Kaga.
