= August Sørensen =

Danish track and field athlete

August Emanuel Sørensen (15 November 1896 – 1 March 1979) was a Danish track and field athlete who competed in the 1920 Summer Olympics. He was born in Helsingør and died in Frederiksberg. In 1920, he was a member of the Danish relay team, which finished fifth in the 4 × 100 metre relay event. In the 100 metres competition as well as in the 200 metres event, he was eliminated in the quarter-finals.
