= Sven Krokström =

Swedish sprinter

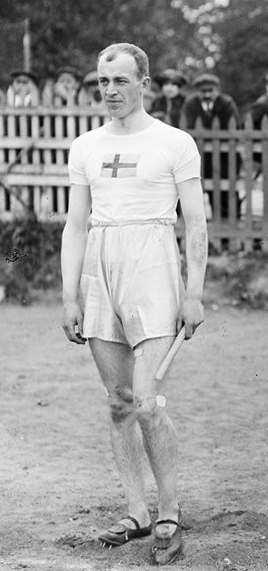
- Sven Krokström in 1920

Personal information
- Born: 2 May 1895 Gävle, Sweden
- Died: 31 August 1971 (aged 76) Gävle, Sweden

Sport
- Sport: Athletics
- Events: 200 m, 400 m
- Club: IFK Gävle

Achievements and titles
- Personal bests: 200 m – 22.1 (1920); 400 m – 50.4 (1920)

Sven Olof Krokström (2 May 1895 – 31 August 1971) was a Swedish sprinter who competed at the 1920 Summer Olympics. He finished fifth with the Swedish 4 × 400 m relay team and failed to reach the finals of the 200 m event and 400 m events.
