= Jaime Camps =

Spanish sprinter

Personal information
- Nationality: Spanish
- Born: 28 February 1896 San Sebastián, Spain
- Died: 3 August 1921 (aged 25) Annual, Morocco

Sport
- Sport: Sprinting
- Event: 100 metres

Jaime Camps (28 February 1896 – 3 August 1921) was a Spanish sprinter. He competed in the men's 100 metres at the 1920 Summer Olympics. He was killed in action during the Battle of Annual.
