= Denis Black =

British sprinter

Denis Victor Black (20 October 1897 – 21 July 1973) was a British track and field athlete who competed in the 1920 Summer Olympics. In 1920, he was a member of the British relay team, which finished fourth in the 4x100 metre relay event. He was born in Aylsham, Norfolk.
