= Walter Leibundgut =

Swiss sprinter

Personal information
- Nationality: Swiss
- Born: 12 June 1901

Sport
- Sport: Sprinting
- Event: 4 × 100 metres relay

Walter Leibundgut (born 12 June 1901, date of death unknown) was a Swiss sprinter. He competed in the men's 4 × 100 metres relay at the 1920 Summer Olympics.
