= Erik Lindvall =

Swedish sprinter

Personal information
- Nationality: Swedish
- Born: 8 March 1895
- Died: 5 June 1973 (aged 78)

Sport
- Sport: Sprinting
- Event: 100 metres

Erik Lindvall (8 March 1895 – 5 June 1973) was a Swedish sprinter. He competed in the men's 100 metres at the 1920 Summer Olympics.
