= Leonard Dixon =

South African sprinter

Personal information
- Nationality: South African
- Born: 12 May 1896 Durban, Colony of Natal
- Died: 21 November 1951 (aged 55)

Sport
- Sport: Sprinting
- Event: 100 metres

Leonard Dixon (12 May 1896 – 21 November 1951) was a South African sprinter. He competed in the men's 100 metres at the 1920 Summer Olympics.
