= Johan Johnsen =

Norwegian sprinter (1893–1927)

Johan Christian Arnt Johnsen (27 January 1893 – 27 January 1927) was a Norwegian sprinter born in Oslo, Norway. He died exactly 34 years later in Oslo.

Johnsen competed at the 1920 Summer Olympics in Antwerp, Belgium in the men's 100 m for Norway. He was unable to pass through the heats phase, finishing fourth in his heat of five, with his time being unknown.

Johnsen's personal best in the 100 m was set in 1919, with a time of 10.7 seconds. During this period, he was representing IK Tjalve in Oslo.
