= Fritiof Andersen =

Danish sprinter and long jumper

Fritiof Normann Andersen (30 May 1898 – 24 January 1954) was a Danish track and field athlete who competed in the 1920 Summer Olympics. In 1920 he was a member of the Danish relay team which finished fifth in the 4 × 100 metre relay competition. He also participated in the 100 metre event but was eliminated in the first round.
