= Vittorio Zucca =

Italian sprinter

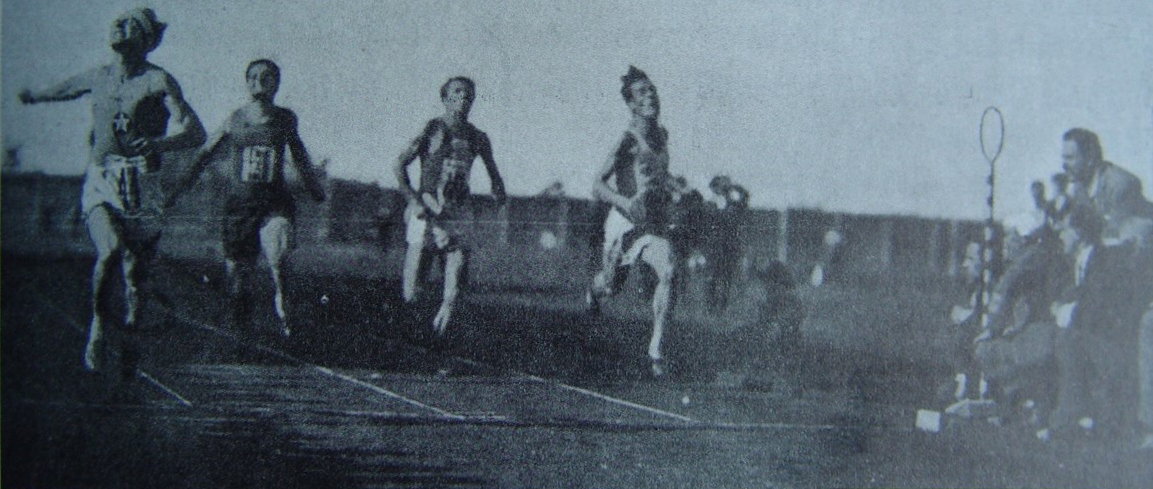
- Zucca (on the left) wins the 100 meters at the 1922 national championships in Busto Arsizio.

Personal information
- Nationality: Italian
- Born: 3 October 1895 Pula, Austrian Littoral, Austria-Hungary
- Died: 30 June 1943 (aged 47)

Sport
- Sport: Sport of athletics
- Event: Sprinting

Vittorio Zucca (Italian pronunciation: [vitˈtɔːrjo dˈdzukka; tˈtsukka], 3 October 1895 – 30 June 1943) was an Italian sprinter.

== Biography ==
He competed at the 1920 and the 1924 Summer Olympics. Vittorio Zucca has won four time the individual national championship. On the track in the sand of a 100 meters of the Olympic Games in Antwerp in 1920, he measured Vittorio Zucca, a native of Pula, at that time part of the Kingdom of Italy. Zucca was also in Paris 1924.

== Achievements ==
| Year | Competition | Venue | Position | Event | Notes |
|---|---|---|---|---|---|
| 1920 | Olympic Games | (Belgium) Antwerp | QF | 100 metres | 11.4 |
| 1920 | Olympic Games | (Belgium) Antwerp | Heat | 4×100 metres relay | 43.6 |
| 1924 | Olympic Games | (France) Paris | Heat | 100 metres | 11.5 |

== National titles ==
- 3 wins on 100 metres (1919, 1920, 1922)
- 1 win on 200 metres (1920)

== See also ==
- Italy at the 1924 Summer Olympics
- 100 metres winners of Italian Athletics Championships
