= Jean-René Seurin =

French sprinter

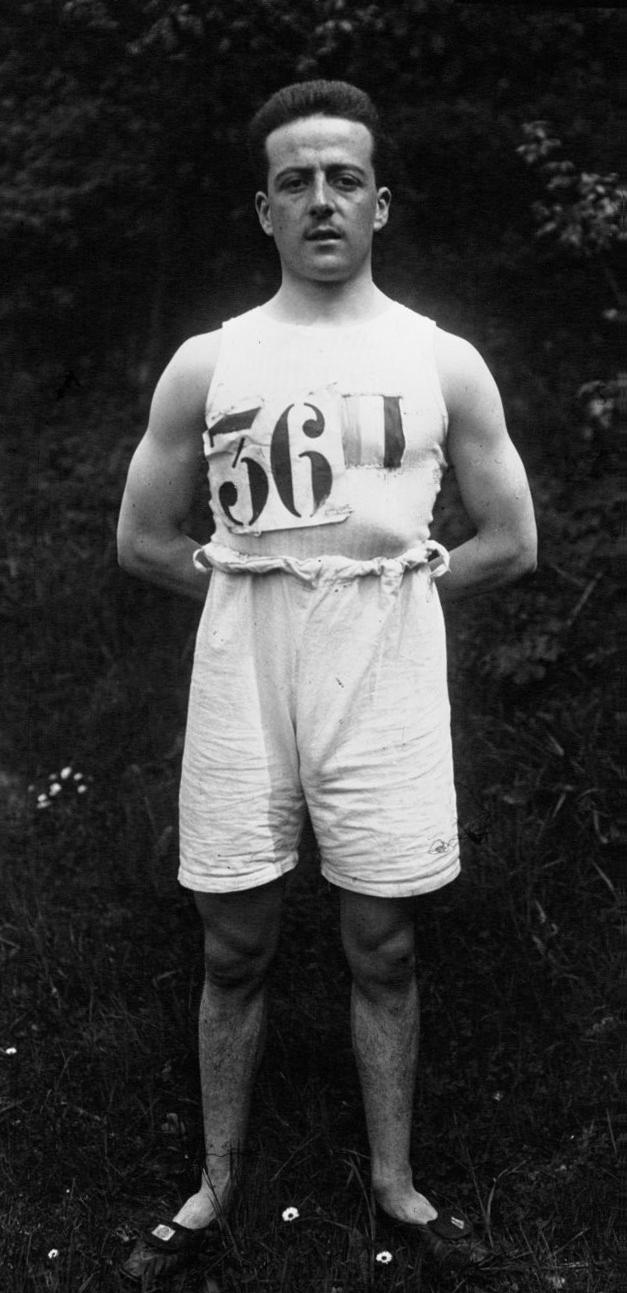
- Jean-René Seurin in 1919

Personal information
- Born: 20 April 1900 Paris, France
- Died: 27 April 1981 (aged 81) Paris, France

Sport
- Sport: Athletics
- Event: Sprint
- Club: Stade français, Paris

Achievements and titles
- Personal best: 200 m – 22.2 (1920)

Jean-René Seurin (20 April 1900 – 27 April 1981) was a French sprinter. He participated in the 200 m event at the 1920 Summer Olympics, but did not reach the final.
