= Marinus Sørensen =

Danish track and field athlete

Marinus Ludwig Sørensen (29 January 1898 – 13 February 1965) was a Danish track and field athlete who competed in the 1920 Summer Olympics. In 1920 he was a member of the Danish relay team which finished fifth in the 4 × 100 metre relay competition. He also participated in the 100 metre event and but was eliminated in the quarter-finals.
