= Carlos Pajarón =

Spanish sprinter

Personal information
- Full name: Carlos María Pajarón del Álamo
- Nationality: Spanish
- Born: 7 April 1903
- Died: 9 August 1961 (aged 58)

Sport
- Sport: Sprinting
- Event: 200 metres

Carlos María Pajarón del Álamo (7 April 1903 – 9 August 1961) was a Spanish sprinter. He competed in the men's 200 metres at the 1920 Summer Olympics.
