= Morris Kirksey =

America athletics competitor and rugby union player

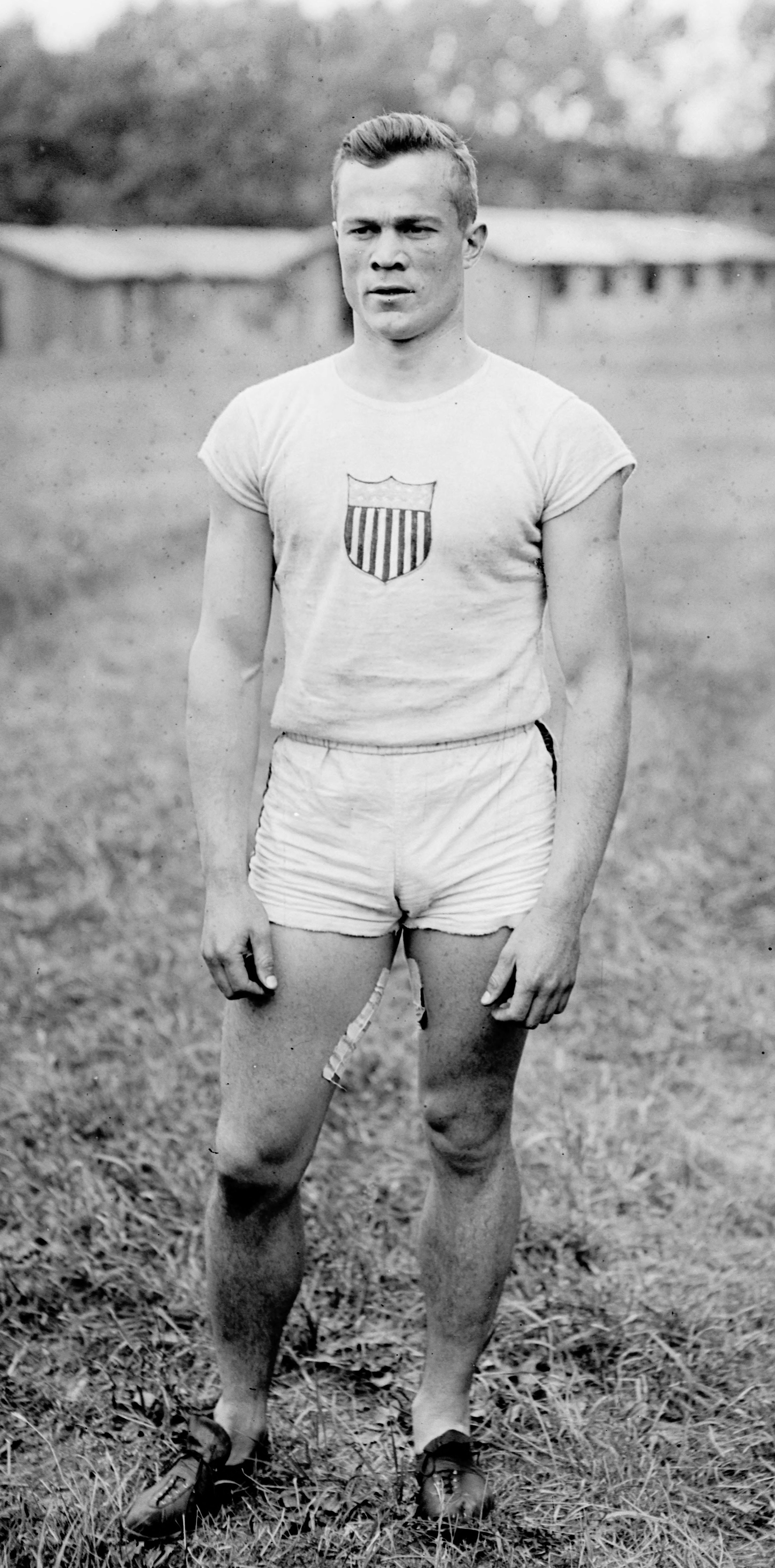
- Kirksey in 1920

Personal information
- Full name: Morris Marshall Kirksey
- Born: September 13, 1895 Waxahachie, Texas, U.S.
- Died: November 25, 1981 (aged 86) San Mateo, California, U.S.
- Height: 5 ft 10 in (1.78 m)
- Weight: 170 lb (77 kg)

Sport
- Country: United States
- Sport: Athletics, Rugby
Medal record
Representing the United States
Olympic Games
Men's athletics
Gold medal – first place	1920 Antwerp	4 × 100 m relay
Silver medal – second place	1920 Antwerp	100 metres
Men's rugby
Gold medal – first place	1920 Antwerp	Team

Morris Marshall Kirksey (September 13, 1895 – November 25, 1981) was an American track and field athlete and rugby union footballer who won two gold medals at the 1920 Summer Olympics. He is one of the few athletes to win gold medals in two different Olympic sports.

== Biography ==
Born in Waxahachie, Texas, Kirksey moved to the San Francisco Bay Area when he was about 13 years old and graduated from Palo Alto High School in 1913.

At the 1920 Olympic Games in Antwerp, Kirksey finished second in the 100-meter sprint behind Charley Paddock. Six days later, he anchored the United States 4 × 100-meter relay team that won the gold medal in a world record time of 42.2 seconds. Two weeks later, Kirksey won his second gold medal, helping the American rugby team defeat France 8–0.

As a Stanford University student, Kirksey won the IC4A championships in 100 yd (91 m) in 1921, and repeated the Paddock's world record in 100 yd (91 m) of 9.6.

Kirksey earned a bachelor's degree in philosophy from Stanford and then a degree from the St. Louis Medical College. He worked as a staff psychiatrist for the state Department of Corrections, assigned to San Quentin and Folsom prisons.

Morris Kirksey died in San Mateo, California, at the age of 86.
