= Josef Imbach (athlete) =

Swiss sprinter (1894–1964)

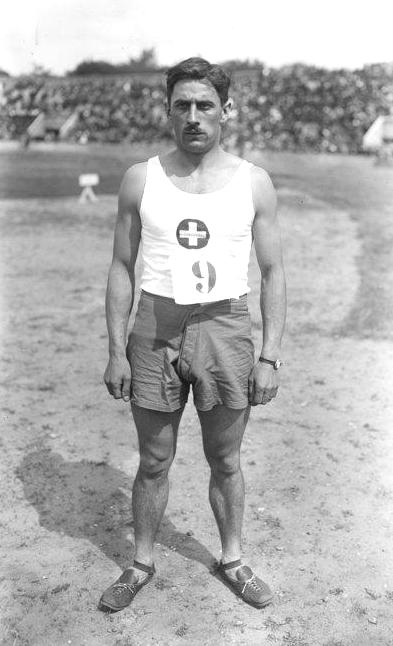
- Imbach in 1921

Personal information
- Born: 15 December 1894 Lyss, Switzxerland
- Died: 14 September 1964 (aged 69) Geneva, Switzerland

Sport
- Sport: Athletics
- Event: Sprints
- Club: CA Geneva

Josef Imbach (15 December 1894 – 14 September 1964) was a Swiss sprinter who competed in the Olympic Games in 1920 and 1924.

== Career ==
At the 1920 Summer Olympics in Antwerp Imbach represented Switzerland in the 100 m and 200 m dashes and the 4 × 100 m relay, but did not qualify for the final in any of these events.

Imbach finished second behind Harry Edward in the 220 yards event at the British 1922 AAA Championships.

Two years later in Paris Imbach competed in the 400 m, winning his heat in 51.8 and then his quarter-final in 48.0. The latter time was an Olympic record and an unofficial world record. (Note: The previous Olympic and world record for men's 400 m was 48.2 by Charles Reidpath from the 1912 Olympics; however, the world record for the slightly longer 440 yd (402.3 m) race was 47.4 by Ted Meredith. Imbach's 48.0 was the best by a European amateur at either distance (Beauchamp Day, a professional, had run 440 yards in 47.8), but although record lists for the metric and imperial distances were kept separately, Imbach's 48.0 was never ratified as either a world record or a European record since Liddell's 47.6 from the final superseded it.) In his semi-final, Imbach placed second to the eventual gold medalist, Eric Liddell, in 48.3. In the final Imbach went out hard, but tripped on the ropes used to separate the lanes, fell and failed to finish.

Imbach also ran in the 4 × 100 m relay as part of the Swiss team; Switzerland was disqualified in the final.
