= Vojtěch Plzák =

Czech sprinter

Personal information
- Nationality: Czech
- Born: 30 April 1896
- Died: 25 February 1947 (aged 50)

Sport
- Sport: Sprinting
- Event: 100 metres

Vojtěch Plzák (30 April 1896 – 25 February 1947) was a Czech sprinter. He competed in the men's 100 metres at the 1920 Summer Olympics.
