= Federico Reparez =

Spanish sprinter

Personal information
- Nationality: Spanish
- Born: 16 November 1899
- Died: 4 April 1979 (aged 79)

Sport
- Sport: Sprinting
- Event: 200 metres

Federico Reparez (16 November 1899 – 4 April 1979) was a Spanish sprinter. He competed in the men's 200 metres at the 1920 Summer Olympics.
