= Shinichi Yamaoka =

Japanese sprinter

Personal information
- Nationality: Japanese
- Born: 19 January 1894 Kyoto, Japan

Sport
- Sport: Sprinting
- Event: 100 metres

Shinichi Yamaoka (山岡 慎一, Yamaoka Shin'ichi; born 19 January 1894, date of death unknown) was a Japanese sprinter. He competed in the men's 100 metres at the 1920 Summer Olympics.
