= Alexander Ponton =

Canadian sprinter

Personal information
- Nationality: Canadian
- Born: 6 February 1898 Edinburgh, Scotland
- Died: 31 October 1949 (aged 51) Toronto, Ontario, Canada

Sport
- Sport: Sprinting
- Event: 100 metres

Alexander Ponton (6 February 1898 – 31 October 1949) was a Canadian sprinter. He competed in the men's 100 metres at the 1920 Summer Olympics.
