= Giorgio Croci =

Italian sprinter

Personal information
- Nationality: Italian
- Born: 20 April 1893
- Died: 15 March 1968 (aged 74)

Sport
- Sport: Sprinting
- Event: 100 metres

Giorgio Croci (20 April 1893 – 15 March 1968) was an Italian sprinter. He competed in the men's 100 metres at the 1920 Summer Olympics.
