= Julien Lehouck =

Belgian athlete

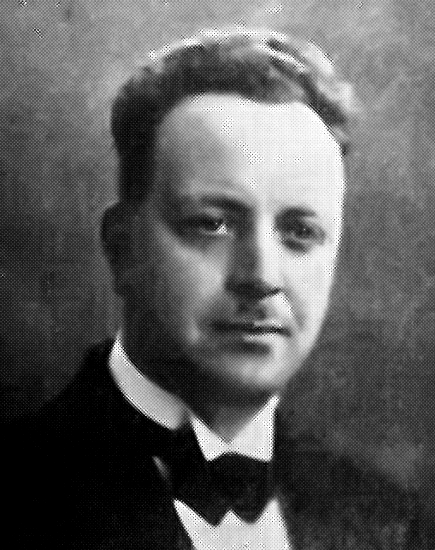

Personal information
- Nationality: Belgian
- Born: 14 August 1896 Egem, Belgium
- Died: 25 February 1944 (aged 47) Breendonk, Belgium

Sport
- Sport: Sprinting
- Event: 100 metres

Julien Lehouck (14 August 1896 – 25 February 1944) was a Belgian sprinter. He competed in the men's 100 metres at the 1920 Summer Olympics. He was part of the Belgian Resistance and was executed in Fort Breendonk during World War II.
