= Charley Paddock =

American athlete and journalist (1900–1943)

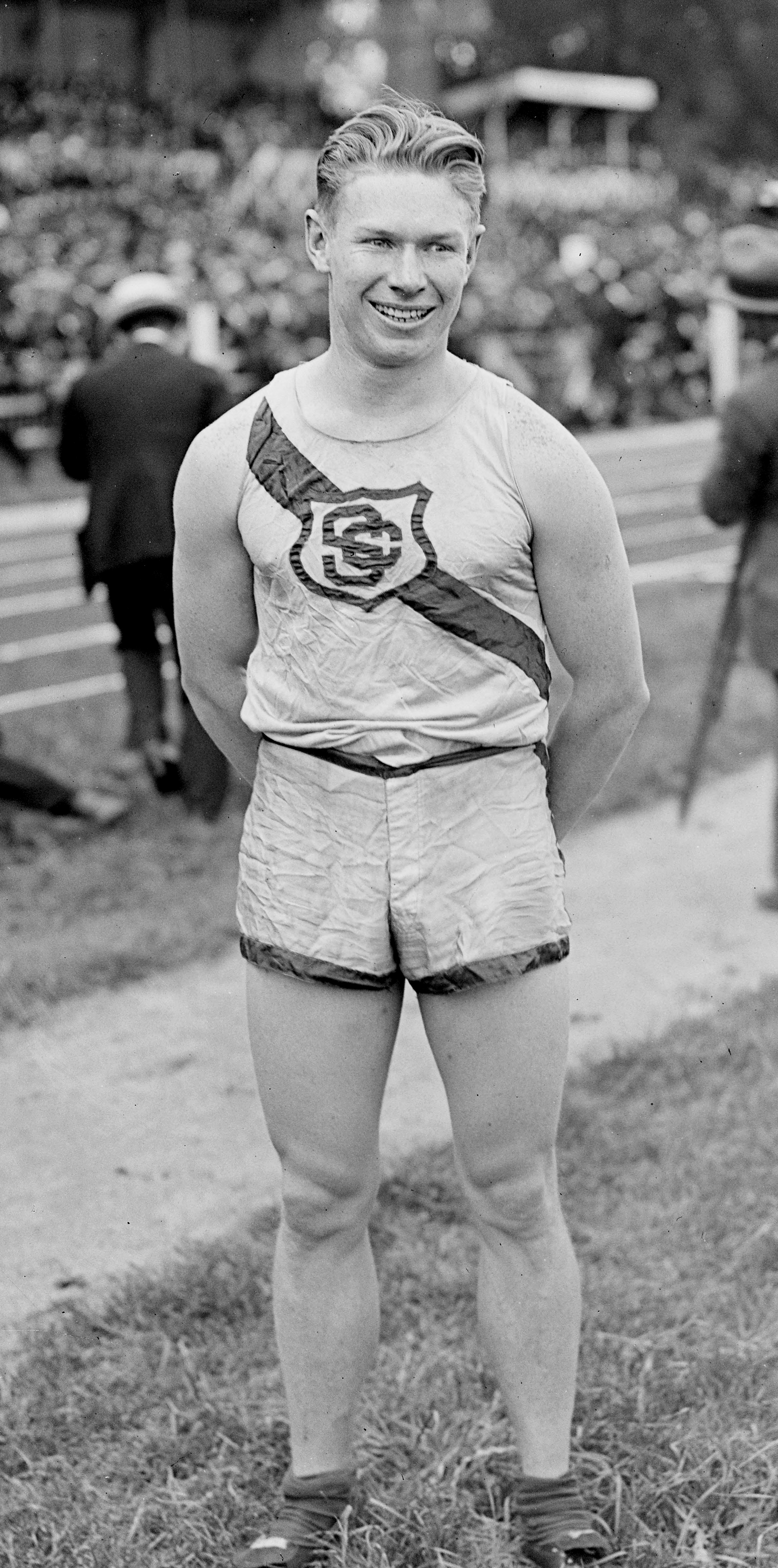
- Charles Paddock after the 1920 Olympics

Personal information
- Full name: Charles William Paddock
- Born: August 11, 1900 Gainesville, Texas, U.S.
- Died: July 21, 1943 (aged 42) Sitka, Alaska, U.S.
- Height: 5 ft 7 1/2 in (171 cm)
- Weight: 165 lb (75 kg)
- Spouse: Neva Prisk Malaby (m. 1930)

Sport
- Sport: Track
- Events: 100 m, 200 m
- College team: University of Southern California
- Club: Los Angeles Athletic Club
- Coached by: Dean Cromwell (USC); John F. Moakley (20 Olympics); Lawson Robertson (24-28 Olympics)

Achievements and titles
- Personal bests: 100 m – 10.2 (1921); 200 m – 21.0 (1923)
Medal record
Men's athletics
Representing the United States
Olympic Games
| Gold medal – first place | 1920 Antwerp | 100 m |
| Gold medal – first place | 1920 Antwerp | 4 × 100 m relay |
| Silver medal – second place | 1920 Antwerp | 200 m |
| Silver medal – second place | 1924 Paris | 200 m |
Universiade
| Gold medal – first place | 1923 Paris | 100 m |
| Gold medal – first place | 1923 Paris | 200 m |

Charles William Paddock was an American track star who competed for the University of Southern California and was a two-time Olympic sprinting champion. In his professional career, he was a nationally-known sports journalist and eventually managed a string of newspapers. In 1981, he was portrayed in the award-winning film about the 1924 games, Chariots of Fire.

== Early life ==
Paddock was born in Gainesville, Texas, to Charles Hurd Paddock and Lulu (Robinson) Paddock. His family moved to Pasadena, California, when he was a child. He attended Throop Polytechnic from the 2nd through 8th grades. When his uncanny running speed became apparent, school officials had to overcome his father's objections to his competing.

Paddock attended Pasadena High School from 1915–18. On April 8, 1916, as a freshman, he won the 100 and 220 at the California State Meet. On April 28, 1917, at State, he finished a close 2nd in the 100, and won the 220. On April 27, 1918, at State, as a junior, Paddock won the 100 and 220, and P.H.S. won the team competition.

He skipped his senior year to attend the University of Southern California.

=== World War I era ===
He interrupted his freshman year at USC to train at Camp Zachary Taylor, Louisville, Kentucky, from November 1918 to about January 1919, graduating as an Army 2nd lieutenant from the Field Artillery School. He restarted college in the second semester. He won the 100 and 200 m in the first major sporting event after the war, the 1919 Inter-Allied Games, in which soldiers of the Allied nations competed against each other.

=== University of Southern California ===
Managed by gifted coach Dean Cromwell, Paddock lettered at USC consecutively from 1920-1923, and captained the team as a senior in 1923. He attended the university aided by an athletic scholarship. During his collegiate years, in 1921, he first set 100-yard dash world record and tied the world record in the 220-yard dash at a Berkeley, California track meet. As a tribute to his collegiate achievements, he was later honored as a member of two All-Century Teams for the Pac-10.

== 1920 Antwerp Olympics ==
In 1920, Paddock represented his country at the 1920 Summer Olympics in Antwerp under Head Olympic Coach John F. Moakley, who coached track at Cornell for fifty years. In Belgium, he had his greatest successes, winning the 100 m final, while placing second in the 200 m event. With the American 4 × 100 m relay team, Paddock won a third Olympic medal. Paddock became well known for his unusual finishing style, leaping towards the finish line at the end of the race.

In 1921 year, he ran the 110 yd dash, which is slightly more than 100 m, in 10.2 seconds. It was not until 1956 that the world record for the 100 m became lower than Paddock's time over 110 yard. Paddock broke or equaled several other world records over Imperial distances.

== 1924, 1928 Olympics ==
Under the management of Coach Lawson Robertson at the 1924 Paris Olympics, Paddock again qualified for both the 100 and 200 m finals, but he was less successful than four years earlier. Paddock finished 5th in the 100 m and won another silver medal in the 200 m., and was not a part of the American relay team. In Chariots of Fire, the 1981 Oscar-winning film about those races, Paddock was portrayed by Dennis Christopher.

Again under the management of Lawson Robertson in 1928, Paddock participated in his 1928 Amsterdam Olympics, running a 22.1 in the semi-final of the 200m sprint, but did not reach the final. Percy Williams of Canada took the gold with a time of 21.8, Walter Rangley of Great Britain took the silver with a time of 21.9, Helmut Kornig took the Bronze with a time of 21.9.

== 1932 attempted comeback ==
In July 1929, Paddock announced his retirement from running in a syndicated news article. By early 1930, he'd changed his mind and started aiming at making his 4th Olympic team. It didn't work out, and at the Olympics Trials, July 15–16, 1932, he was merely a spectator.

== Writing career ==
Paddock aspired to be an author from an early age. While a 13-year-old 8th grader at Throop Polytechnic, his local Pasadena Star described him as “writing a number of stories that have won high praise from his teachers and friends.” Two of those stories were published in the paper on December 24 and 29, 1913. He also edited Throop’s school paper, Elementary Life.

The following June, he impressed all concerned by dramatizing Sir Walter Scott’s narrative poem The Lay of the Last Minstrel. He also acted in the performance. The News lauded him as “the youngest dramatist in Pasadena, if not the entire state.” He followed up with dramatizations of Scott’s The Lady of the Lake and Washington Irving’s The Legend of Sleepy Hollow. For these plays he “organized, costumed and drilled companies of boys and girls of his own age and older for the presentation of these dramatizations before audiences of his elders numbering hundreds.”

At Pasadena High, he participated in debate and oration contests. For example, on April 24, 1917, as a sophomore, he won a prize for his speech on “Alcohol and Labor.”

At USC, he wrote for the Daily Trojan, serving as editor-in-chief for the 1920–21 school year.

After attending the Inter-Allied Games, Paris, in 1919, he wrote a 10-part series about the event for the Pasadena Star-News. He followed up with two 4-part series on postwar conditions abroad. He continued as an occasional sports reporter for the Star-News. A highlight was his 12-part report on the Antwerp Olympics. He joined the staff of the Star-News in this period.

In 1921, he said that “his greatest ambition in life is to become a novelist really worth while.” That year, he started a long record of appearing in mass-market magazines like Leslie's, Scientific American, and Physical Culture, generally writing about track and fitness. He eventually appeared in the most popular magazines, like the Saturday Evening Post and Collier's. He never published a novel.

After the first semester of his senior year at USC, in January 1922 he graduated with a B.A. in English. He took a break from running to devote his time to writing. He began producing sports reports for other area newspapers.

His career arc was more or less set. He wrote hundreds of articles and columns for the Star-News, while occasionally appearing in other local newspapers, and national magazines. When his reporting had broader interest, his articles were syndicated nationwide. In the 1920s, his writing was off and on as he traveled extensively to compete; once his running career wound down, he became a more productive writer.

Paddock married Neva Prisk Malaby on December 11, 1930, at the home of her parents, Mr. and Mrs. Charles H. Prisk. Prisk published the Star-News, the Long Beach Press-Telegram, and other local papers. Neva had a son from a previous marriage, Charles Prisk Malaby (1924–2007); Paddock and Neva had one child together, Charles William Paddock, Jr. (1931–2024).

Paddock published his memoirs twice. The first was Flying Feet, serialized in six parts by Sport Story Magazine (March 8–May 22, 1928). The second was his book The Fastest Human (1932). His only other book was Track and Field (1933), a technique manual.

Following the death of the business manager on March 15, 1933, on April 1 Paddock became business manager of Prisk’s Long Beach Press-Telegram. In August, he was elected a director of the Press-Telegram Publishing Company. He continued to write regularly for the papers while serving in management.

After Charles H. Prisk died on March 4, 1940, Paddock was elected vice president and general manager of Prisk’s newspapers. He was essentially editor-in-chief though the title was left in Prisk’s name to honor his memory.

=== Columnist ===
(As an adult, Paddock typically bylined his work Charles W. Paddock or Charley Paddock.)

- Sport Sidelights, Pasadena Star-News, August 2, 1921–October 28, 1922
- Pasadena Champions, Pasadena Star-News, March 25, 1931–March 19, 1940
- Spikes, Pasadena Star-News, January 5, 1931–March 13, 1940
- Sports of the Week, Long Beach Sun, Pasadena Post, June 7, 1932–February 25, 1940
- Birthdays of Champions, Pasadena Post, Long Beach Press-Telegram, October 1, 1932–December 12, 1934
- Youth Speaks, Pasadena Star-News, April 3, 1933–October 7, 1940
- Sportorials, Long Beach Press-Telegram, September 10, 1936–March 14, 1940
- Thoughts of the Day, Pasadena Star-News, November 27, 1936–July 9, 1942

=== Selected magazine articles ===
- “The Psychology of Running”, Leslie's, June 11, 1921
- “The Science of Athletics”, Scientific American, October 8, 1921
- “Superstition Helps Me to Win Races”, Physical Culture, June 1922
- “Our Super-Swimmers”, Physical Culture, October 1922
- “How Did Nurmi Do It?”, Physical Culture, January 1925
- The Glory of the Game, Sport Story Magazine, May 8–July 22, 1925 [6-part serial on American sports triumphs]
- “Douglas the Daring”, Strength, October 1925 [portrait of Douglas Fairbanks]
- “What Do Athletics Get You?”, McClure's, March 1928
- Flying Feet, Sport Story Magazine, March 8–May 22, 1928 [6-part memoir]
- “A Word to Young Athletes”, Sport Story, July 22, 1928
- “Why Athletes Fail in Pictures”, Photoplay, September 1928
- “One Out of Ten”, Saturday Evening Post, June 29, 1929
- “No Son of Mine”, Collier's, August 17, 1929
- “Chief Bright Path”, Collier's, October 5–October 26, 1929 [4-part portrait of Jim Thorpe]
- “The Record Breakers”, Saturday Evening Post, November 2, 1929 [sprinters]
- “He Lives to Run”, Collier's, May 31, 1930 [Paavo Nurmi]
- “Booze Beats Our Athletes”, Collier's, June 14, 1930
- “The Boy in Athletics”, Saturday Evening Post, June 21, 1930
- “Are Women Good Sports?”, The New Smart Set, July 1930
- “S-t-r-e-t-c-h”, Cosmopolitan, November 1930
- “All Time All-American Track Team”, College Humor, April 1931
- “Douglas Fairbanks at 50”, Physical Culture, May 1931
- “We Just Don’t Care”, Sport Story, November 10, 1931
- “If You Think You Can—”, Collier's, November 28, 1931
- “Pick-Up”, Collier's, April 16, 1932 [acceleration in sprinting]
- “Big Ben”, Collier's, April 23, 1932
- “Falling Star”, Collier's, April 15, 1933
- “The Metric Mystery”, College Humor and Sense, June 1933
- “Grandstand”, Esquire, Autumn 1933 [why champions fade]
- “Fleeting Little Fella”, Collier's, September 23, 1939

=== Selected newspaper articles ===
- How World Honors Were Won Abroad By American Athletes, Pasadena Star-News, September 10–September 20, 1919 [10-part series on the Inter-Allied Games]
- Since Peace Was Signed, Pasadena Star-News, September 22–September 25, 1919 [4-part series]
- The Signing of the Peace, Pasadena Star-News, September 26–October 3, 1919 [4-part series]
- Story of the Olympic Games, Pasadena Star-News, October 2–October 16, 1920 [12-part series]
- “High Praise for Jackson Scholz from His Rival”, Pasadena Star-News, June 16, 1924
- Jim Thorpe Greatest, Pasadena Star-News, July 2–July 6, 1929 [4-part series]
- “Why I Have Quit Running”, Kansas City Journal-Post, July 7, 1929 [syndicated]
- “Amateur Athletics”, Pasadena Star-News, July 8–July 13, 1929 [6-part history]

=== Selected fiction ===
- “St. Nicholas; The First Christmas”, Pasadena Daily News, December 24, 1913
- “In the Forest of Mano”, Pasadena Daily News, December 29, 1913 [“Pasadena Boy’s Story of a Druid Incident”]
- “The Conqueror”, Pasadena Star-News, October 10, 1916 [sprinting story]

=== Books ===
- The Fastest Human (NY: Thomas Nelson & Sons, 1932) [memoir]
- Track and Field (NY: A.S. Barnes and Company, 1933)

== Film career ==
Paddock’s acting background, his natural charm, his enormous celebrity in the 1920s, and the proximity of Pasadena to Hollywood makes his move into the movies seem inevitable. He also benefitted from a mid-decade trend, that he wrote about in Photoplay, of sports stars being tried out as film stars. Numerous sports celebrities were cast in dramatic roles in feature films: Jack Dempsey and Gertrude Ederle (1924); Duke Kahanamoku and Paddock (1925); Red Grange, Gene Tunney, and Bill Tilden (1926); and Babe Ruth (1927).

Paddock’s first film, and first starring role, was Nine and Three-Fifths Seconds (1925), the title a callback to his 9.6 of April 25, 1924, run in a pouring rain at the Drake Relays, which tied the world record in the 100-yard dash. In the film, he’s thrown out of his home, and raises his fortunes through a series of heroics which all include running fast. In the climax, he goes to the Olympics and wins the sprint—and the girl.

Paddock’s next picture, The Campus Flirt (1926), came out a year later and was uniformly advertised as his first film role. He didn’t star this time, rather he was featured, his name listed below the star, Bebe Daniels. The film is about a spoiled girl in college who, it turns out, can run faster than anyone on the women’s track team. The coach of the team is Charley Paddock, using his own name. But he’s not the love interest; that belongs to another student. In real life, according to the press coverage, Daniels and Paddock became engaged during the making of the film. One movie mag devoted four photo-illustrated pages to the subject, describing Charley’s insistence on an early marriage, while Bebe declared, “It’ll be at least a year.” Several months later, they called off the engagement, vowing to remain “just friends.”

Daniels attracted most of the critical attention, but well-known critic Epes W. Sargent offered: “Charles Paddock proves that he can act as well as run.”

Paddock was then typecast in films released weeks apart, both minor parts. In Fox’s High School Hero (October 16, 1927), he played a basketball coach. In Columbia’s The College Hero (October 29), he played a football coach, and also served as technical advisor. After the latter was released, Variety snarked, “Charles Paddock, the running man, seems to go from one Hollywood studio to another impersonating head coaches.” However, playwright Robert E. Sherwood, who praised High School Hero, commended the director for developing “hitherto unsuspected talents in Charles Paddock.”

Paddock got one last shot in feature films, starring in The Olympic Hero, another rags-to-riches story of a commoner who wins the big race—and the girl. The film’s release was timed to coincide with the runup to the Amsterdam games (July 28–August 12, 1928). It debuted in Washington, D.C. on April 21 in a 30-minute version, after which Paddock spoke to the audience. In May, the presentation moved on to New York, then Boston. “He has a good act,” wrote a New York reviewer, “standing out there in front of a rose-pink velvet curtain in white ducks, with a mellow golden spotlight.” In June, a 60-minute general release version played around the country.

Before the Washington debut, Paddock was already receiving blowback from the custodians of amateur athletics, based on the presumption that he was being paid for his involvement in the film—acting and speaking. Allegations were referred to the Southern Pacific Association of the Amateur Athletic Union, the body that awarded Paddock his amateur credentials. Two weeks later, Paddock declared: “Oh, that’s all straightened out.”

The Olympic trials (July 6–7) provided another test. Paddock finished last in his 100 meters semi, while Southern California teenager Frank Wykoff won the final. The next day, Paddock finished second in the 200 to secure a spot on the team, but that initiated another protest over his eligibility. The case was handled quickly since the team was set to sail on July 10. Paddock presented affidavits from the producer and exhibitor that he had not been paid for The Olympic Hero, and was cleared. At the Olympics, however, his failure to make the 200 final became part of the disappointment of the U.S. being shut out of the 100 and 200 medals.

His experiences illustrated the risks of starring athletes in films, especially with a title like The Olympic Hero which implied promises about its athlete-actor that needed to be kept on two fronts, life and art. Not only his underwhelming performance in the Olympics, but the entire amateurism debate, told in bold headlines, overshadowed the film.

Two weeks after the Olympics, Paddock arrived back in the U.S. “I think the gong has sounded,” he said about his running career. “I am through.” Instead, he saw his future in “the moving pictures.” He expected to go to Paris in early 1929 to begin serious acting, in a picture which had nothing to do with athletics. Three days later, Variety gossiped that he was engaged to a French film star. Nothing came of the trip, the film, or the star.

In February 1931, Paddock signed a novel “no compensation” contract with Universal to appear in three shorts as part of Christy Walsh’s All-American Sports Subjects series which featured famous sports figures. Only one Paddock entry in the series is known, Running with Charles Paddock (10 minutes), added to film bills beginning in April 1932.

In May, a new company, Olympiad Pictures Corporation, was announced, with Paddock as president, actor James Gleason as vice-president, and sports writer Norman L. Sper as secretary and treasurer. Their mission was to create nine two-reel (20-minute) comedy films in a series called Jerry of the Journal. The films would be made at Metropolitan Studios and released through Educational Films Corporation of America. Sper was producer, Gleason director, and Paddock story writer. Veteran actor Eugene Pallette was cast as Jerry, a sports writer who covers a different sport in each film. Other cast members included Gleason’s wife Lucile Webster Gleason, son Russell Gleason, and famed athlete Jim Thorpe.

The first entry, Off His Base (IMDb, YouTube), a baseball story, was released on September 18, 1932. Erle Hampton, Hollywood publicity man, completed the continuity and dialogue. Diana Serra Cary (1918–2020), a child star of the early ’20s under the name “Baby Peggy” was cast for the series, but only appeared in this first film (as Peggy Montgomery). The second entry, Always Kickin' (IMDb, YouTube), football, was released on October 9. The third entry, A Hockey Hick (IMDb), was released on December 11. Thorpe was not in the film.

Only the three films were released. On April 1, 1933, Paddock took over the Long Beach Press-Telegram under emergency circumstances. Whether the early end of the series and the new position were related is unknown. But Paddock’s involvement in film was over.

== Death and honors ==
On July 10, 1942, Paddock was commissioned a captain in the USMC. He said he picked the Marines to "see plenty of action." On July 21, 1943, Major General William P. Upshur, his aide Paddock, and four others, died in a plane crash near Sitka, Alaska. Paddock is interred at Sitka National Cemetery.

In 1919, the University of Southern California established a scholarship in his name. In 1976 Paddock was inducted into the National Track and Field Hall of Fame.

== Selected competition record ==
| Year | Competition | Venue | Position | Event | Notes |
Representing Throop Polytechnic
| 1913 | | Pasadena | 1st | 100 y | 11.4 |
| 1913 | | Pasadena | 1st | 220 y | 25.8 |
| 1914 | Grammar School Championships | Pasadena | 2nd | 100 y | 11.2 |
| 1914 | Grammar School Championships | Pasadena | 1st | 220 y | 25.0 |
| 1915 | Grammar School | Pasadena | 1st | 100 y | 10.8 |
| 1915 | Grammar School | Pasadena | 1st | 220 y | 25.0 |
Representing Pasadena High School
| 1916 | California State Meet | Los Angeles | 1st | 100 y | 10.4 |
| 1916 | California State Meet | Los Angeles | 1st | 220 y | 22.4 |
| 1917 | California State Meet | Berkeley | 2nd | 100 y | ~10.0 |
| 1917 | California State Meet | Berkeley | 1st | 220 y | 22.0 |
| 1918 | California State Meet | Sacramento | 1st | 100 y | 10.2 |
| 1918 | California State Meet | Sacramento | 1st | 220 y | 22.4 |
Representing USC
| 1921 | Southern California AAU | Redlands, California | 1st | 100 m | 10.4 WR |
Representing United States
| 1919 | Inter-Allied Games | Paris, France | 1st | 100 m | 10.8 |
| 1919 | Inter-Allied Games | Paris | 1st | 200 m | 21.6 |
| 1919 | Inter-Allied Games | Paris | 1st | 4x200 m relay | 1:30.8 |
| 1920 | Olympics | Antwerp, Belgium | 1st | 100 m | 10.8 |
| 1920 | Olympics | Antwerp | 2nd | 200 m | 22.0 |
| 1920 | Olympics | Antwerp | 1st | 4x100 m relay | 42.2 WR |
| 1923 | Universiade | Paris | 1st | 100 m | 10.4 |
| 1923 | Universiade | Paris | 1st | 200 m | 21.0 |
| 1924 | Olympics | Paris | 5th | 100 m | 10.9 |
| 1924 | Olympics | Paris | 2nd | 200 m | 21.7 |
| 1928 | Olympics | Amsterdam, Netherlands | 4th (semi) | 200 m | 22.1 |
independent
| 1924 | Drake Relays | Des Moines, Iowa | 1st | 100 y | 9.6 =WR |

* WR=World Record
