= Alex Servais =

Luxembourgish sprinter

Personal information
- Nationality: Luxembourgish
- Born: 2 March 1896 Luxembourg City, Luxembourg
- Died: 17 December 1949 (aged 53)

Sport
- Sport: Sprinting
- Event: 100 metres

Alexandre Louis "Alex" Servais (2 March 1896 – 17 December 1949) was a Luxembourgish sprinter. He competed in the men's 100 metres at the 1920 Summer Olympics.
