= Jean Proess =

Luxembourgish sprinter

Personal information
- Nationality: Luxembourgish
- Born: 29 April 1896
- Died: 8 June 1978 (aged 82)

Sport
- Event: 400 metres

Jean Proess (29 April 1896 – 8 June 1978) was a Luxembourgish sprinter. He competed in the men's 400 metres at the 1920 Summer Olympics.
