= Carlos Botín =

Spanish sprinter

Personal information
- Nationality: Spanish
- Born: 14 January 1900 Madrid, Spain
- Died: 27 November 1988 (aged 88) Madrid, Spain

Sport
- Sport: Sprinting
- Event: 100 metres

Carlos Botín (14 January 1900 – 27 November 1988) was a Spanish sprinter. He competed in the men's 100 metres at the 1920 Summer Olympics.
