= Loren Murchison =

American athlete (1898–1979)

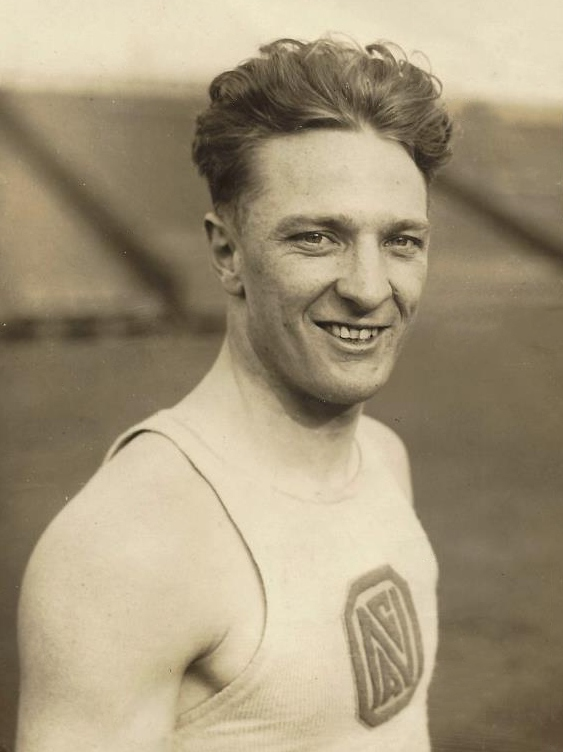
- Murchison in 1923

Personal information
- Born: December 17, 1898 Farmersville, Texas, U.S.
- Died: June 11, 1979 (aged 80) Lakewood, New Jersey, U.S.
- Height: 174 cm (5 ft 9 in)
- Weight: 68 kg (150 lb)

Sport
- Sport: Athletics
- Event: Sprint
- Club: Newark Athletic Club

Achievements and titles
- Personal bests: 100 m – 10.5 (1924); 200 m – 21.5 (1924)
Medal record
Men's athletics
Representing the United States
Olympic Games
Gold medal – first place	1920 Antwerp	4 × 100 m relay
Gold medal – first place	1924 Paris	4 × 100 m relay

Loren C. Murchison (December 17, 1898 – June 11, 1979) was an American athlete, double gold medal winner in 4 × 100 m relay at the Olympic Games.

== Biography ==
Born in Farmersville, Texas, Loren Murchison was an AAU Champion in 100 yd (91 m) in 1920 and 1923 and in 220 yd (200 m) in 1918 and 1923. He also won the British AAA Championships in both 100 yd (91 m) and 220 yd (200 m) at the 1925 AAA Championships.

At the 1920 Summer Olympics, Murchison finished fourth in 200 m and sixth in 100 m. He also ran the third leg in the gold medal winning United States 4 × 100 m relay team, which set a new world record of 42.2 s in the Olympic final. At the 1924 Summer Olympics, Murchison was again sixth in 100 m and won his second Olympic gold medal as an opening leg in the world record (41.0 s) setting American 4 × 100 m relay team.

Murchison was an outstanding indoor runner. He won 14 titles (9 individual and 5 in the relay) at the United States premier indoor athletics meet, the Millrose Games. He was also national indoor champion at the 60 y in 1919–20 and 1922–24, and 300 y in 1919–20 and 1923–24.

Murchison was also a prolific breaker of records indoors. Amongst the world best times he equaled or broke are:

- equaled 60 y best of 6.4 s in 1920, 1922 and 1923;
- established new 60 y best of 6.2 s in 1923;
- 50 m of 6.0 s in 1925;
- 300 y of 31.2 s;
- 220 y best of 22.4 s.

It was such exploits that inspired Charley Paddock (1920 Olympic 100 m champion) to call Murchison "the greatest indoor sprinter of his generation and the finest starter of all-time.

In 1925 Murchison was struck with spinal meningitis and paralyzed from the waist down for the rest of his life.

A resident of Leisure Village in Lakewood Township, New Jersey, Murchison died at the age of 80 on June 11, 1979, at Point Pleasant Hospital in Point Pleasant, New Jersey.
