= Asle Bækkedal =

Norwegian sprinter

Personal information
- Nationality: Norwegian
- Born: 9 December 1896 Oslo, Norway
- Died: 6 June 1952 (aged 55) Gothenburg, Sweden

Sport
- Sport: Sprinting
- Event: 100 metres

Asle Bækkedal (9 December 1896 – 6 June 1952) was a Norwegian sprinter. He competed in the men's 100 metres at the 1920 Summer Olympics.
