= Jean Colbach =

Luxembourgish sprinter

Personal information
- Nationality: Luxembourgish
- Born: 2 January 1897 Lima, Peru
- Died: 3 October 1957 Luxembourg

Sport
- Sport: Sprinting
- Event: 100 metres

Jean Colbach (born 2 January 1897, died 3 October 1957) was a Luxembourgish sprinter. He competed in the men's 100 metres at the 1920 Summer Olympics.
