= Adolf Rysler =

Swiss sprinter

Personal information
- Nationality: Swiss
- Born: 1893
- Died: January 1949 (aged 55–56)

Sport
- Event: 100 metres relay

Adolf Rysler (1893 – January 1949) was a Swiss sprinter. He competed in the men's 4 × 100 metre relay at the 1920 Summer Olympics.
