= René Mourlon =

French sprinter

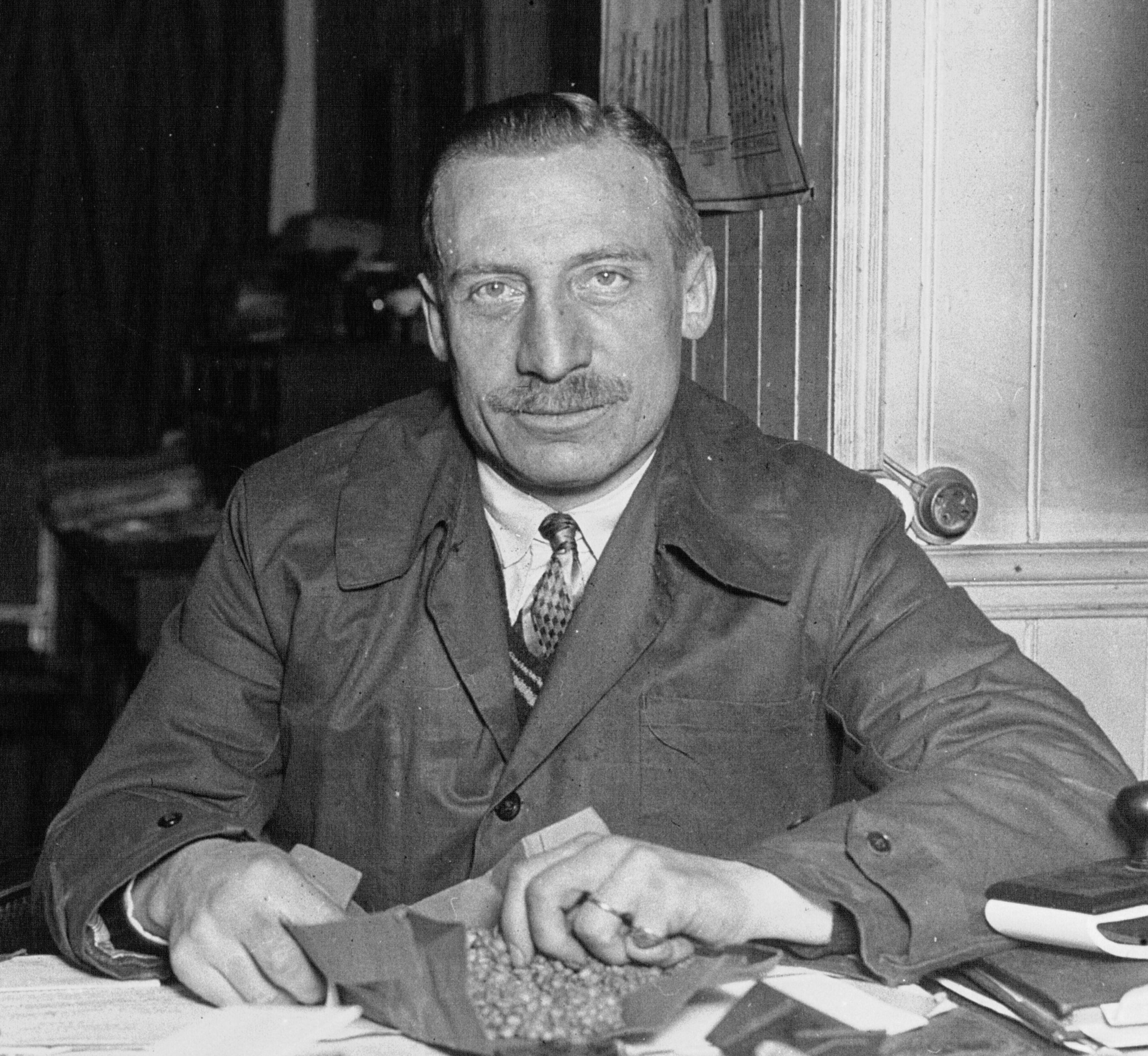
- René Mourlon in 1931

Personal information
- Born: 12 May 1893 Paris, France
- Died: 19 October 1977 (aged 84) Paris, France
- Height: 1.69 m (5 ft 7 in)
- Weight: 65 kg (143 lb)

Sport
- Sport: Athletics
- Event: 100 m
- Club: UAI Paris

Achievements and titles
- Personal best: 100 m – 10.8 (1922)
Medal record
Representing France
Olympic Games
Silver medal – second place	1920 Antwerp	4×100 metre relay

René Fernand Alexandre Mourlon (12 May 1893 – 19 October 1977) was a French sprint runner who competed at the 1912, 1920 and 1924 Summer Olympics in the 100 m and 4×100 metre relay. He won a silver medal in the relay in 1920 and finished fifth in 1924, while failing to reach the final in other events. Nationally, he won the 100 m title in 1912 and 1922. From 1939 to 1958, he served as the technical director of the French Athletics Federation. His younger brother André was also an Olympic sprinter.
