= Émile Ali-Khan =

French sprinter

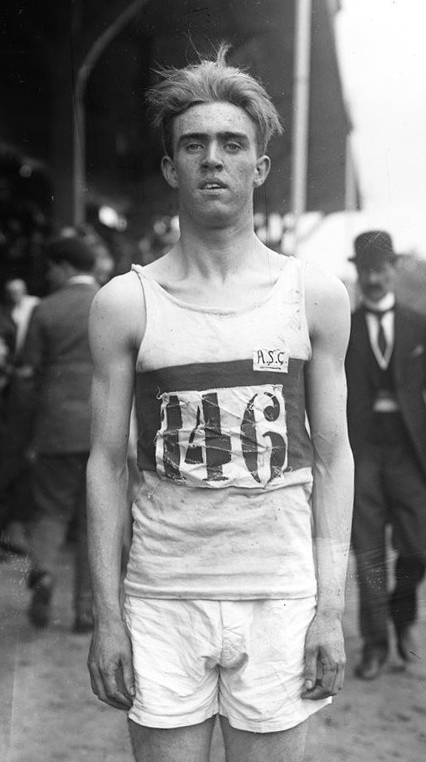
- Émile Ali-Khan in 1920

Personal information
- Born: 2 June 1902 Battle, East Sussex, United Kingdom
- Height: 1.80 m (5 ft 11 in)
- Weight: 69 kg (152 lb)

Sport
- Sport: Athletics
- Event: 100 m
- Club: Nice Sports Athlétique, US de Villefranche-sur-Mer, AS Cannes

Achievements and titles
- Personal best: 100 m – 10.8 (1920)
Medal record
Representing France
Olympic Games
Silver medal – second place	1920 Antwerp	4×100 metre relay

Musood "Émile" Ali-Khan (6 June 1902 – date of death unknown) was a French sprinter. He competed at the 1920 Summer Olympics in the 100 m and 4×100 metre relay events and finished in fifth and second place, respectively. The same year he won the national title in the 100 m and equalled the world record over 60 metres (6.8 s).

Ali-Khan started training in sprint while studying at the Lycée Masséna in Nice. He stopped competing individually in 1921, but continued to run relay races.

Some sources give his date of death as 12 May 1960 but this is actually the day that Prince Aly Khan died.
