= William Hunt (sprinter) =

Australian sprinter

Personal information
- Nationality: Australian
- Born: 23 February 1898
- Died: 27 August 1977 (aged 79)

Sport
- Sport: Sprinting
- Event: 100 metres

William ("Bill") Hunt (23 February 1898 – 27 August 1977) was an Australian sprinter. He competed in the men's 100 metres and the men's 200 metres at the 1920 Summer Olympics. In both events Hunt qualified for the Quarter Finals and ran fourth. Hunt lived in Sydney's southern suburb of Redfern, where he ran with the Redfern Harriers. Later, Hunt devoted much of his post-competition career to Track and Field Athletics, serving as a starter in the Track and Field events at the Melbourne Summer Olympics of 1956, and later becoming one of the founders of Little Athletics in New South Wales.
