= John Francis Moakley =

American track and cross-country coach (1863–1955)

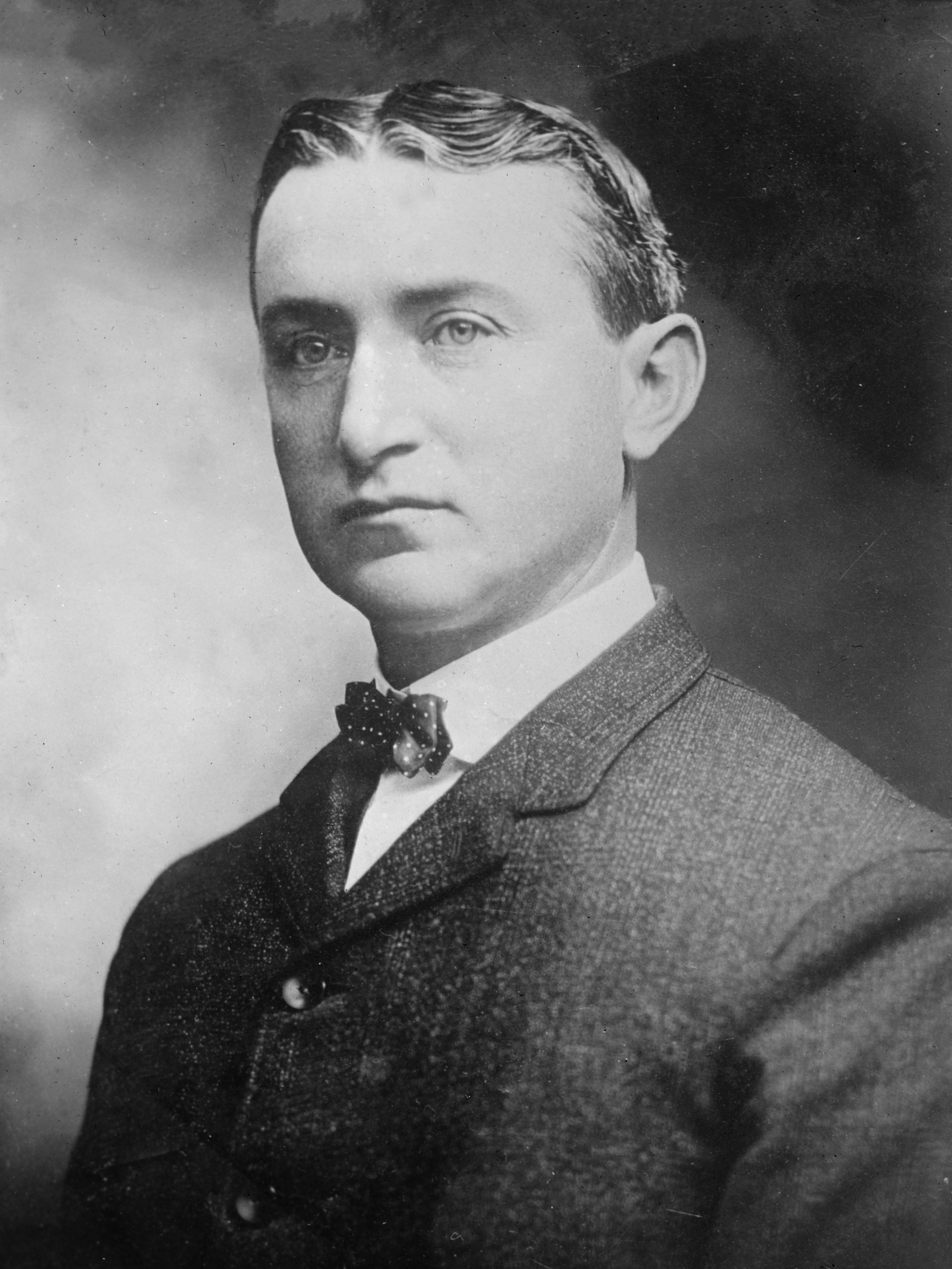

John Francis Moakley (December 11, 1863 – May 21, 1955) was the track and cross-country coach at Cornell University from 1899 to 1949, and coached the United States Olympic track and field team in 1920. He was inducted into the National Track and Field Hall of Fame in 1988.

== Biography ==
He was born on December 11, 1863, in Boston, Massachusetts and attended Boston Latin School. He started as the track and cross-country coach at Cornell University in 1899. He coached the United States track and field team in the 1920 Summer Olympics in Antwerp, Belgium. He retired from Cornell University in 1949. He died on May 21, 1955.
