= Albert Heijnneman =

Dutch sprinter

Personal information
- Nationality: Dutch
- Born: 10 June 1898 Penang, Malaysia
- Died: 20 February 1944 (aged 45) Scheveningen, Netherlands

Sport
- Sport: Sprinting
- Event: 100 metres

Albert Heijnneman (28 October 1898 – 20 February 1944) was a Dutch sprinter. He competed in the men's 100 metres at the 1920 Summer Olympics. He was part of the Dutch resistance and was tortured to death by the Gestapo.
