= August Waibel =

Swiss sprinter

Personal information
- Nationality: Swiss
- Born: 1894
- Died: Unknown

Sport
- Sport: Sprinting
- Event: 100 metres

August Waibel (born 1894, date of death unknown) was a Swiss sprinter. He competed in the men's 100 metres at the 1920 Summer Olympics.
