= Josef Imbach (theologian) =

Josef Imbach (born 3 December 1945 in Zofingen, Aargau) is a controversial Swiss Catholic theologian and Franciscan friar.

He studied theology and philosophy at the Pontifical Theological Faculty of St. Bonaventure in Rome 1967-1973 and from 1975 to 2002 was a professor of fundamental theology there.

In 2002, he was suspended for a year by the Franciscan authorities for (according to him) denying the possibility of miracles. He denied holding this view and publicly protested against the "non-transparent practices" and "unqualified opinion".

Imbach was later banned from teaching in all Catholic theological faculties worldwide by the Congregation for the Doctrine of the Faith. He has been living near Basel since 2005 where he teaches Catholic theology at the Evangelical Theological Faculty.

== Books ==
- Imbach, Josef (1992). Three faces of Jesus: how Jews, Christians, and Muslims see him. Springfield, Ill.: Templegate Publishers. ISBN 0-87243-194-0.
- Imbach, Josef (1997). And he taught them with pictures: the parables in practice today. Springfield, Ill.: Templegate Publishers. ISBN 0-87243-226-2.
- Imbach, Josef (2000). Miracles: A 21st Century Interpretation. Templegate Publishers. ISBN 0-87243-239-4.
- Imbach, Josef (2002). Lust auf die Bibel. St. Olav.
- Imbach, Josef (2004). Walking with Abraham: A Journey in Faith. Templegate Pub. ISBN 0-87243-260-2.
