= Mario Riccoboni =

Italian sprinter

Personal information
- Nationality: Italian
- Born: 16 February 1889
- Died: 15 May 1968 (aged 79)

Sport
- Sport: Sprinting
- Event: 100 metres

Mario Riccoboni (16 February 1889 – 15 May 1968) was an Italian sprinter. He competed in the men's 100 metres at the 1920 Summer Olympics.
