= Reinhold Saulmann =

Estonian sprinter

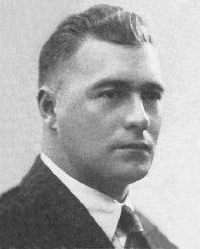

Personal information
- Born: 17 May 1895 Tallinn, Governorate of Estonia, Russian Empire
- Died: 6 June 1936 (aged 41) Tallinn, Estonia
- Height: 184 cm (6 ft 0 in)
- Weight: 75 kg (165 lb)

Sport
- Sport: Athletics
- Event: 100–400 m
- Club: Sport Tallinn

Achievements and titles
- Personal bests: 100 m – 11.6 (1922); 200 m – 24.1 (1922); 400 m – 52.2 (1920)

Reinhold Saulmann (17 May 1895, Tallinn – 6 June 1936, Tallinn) was an Estonian track and field sprinter.

== Career ==
Saulmann was a five-time Estonian champion in track and field events, including the sprints and the 400 metres hurdles. He also held the Estonian records in the 150 m, 300 m, 400 m and 400 m hurdles.

At the 1920 Summer Olympics, he was entered in the 100 m, 200 m and 400 m events. He did not start the 100 m and competed in only the first rounds of the longer sprints, although his estimated time of 51.6 in the 400 m heat was a national record. He also represented Estonia in bandy nine times in 1916–1918. Following his retirement from active competition, he entered sports administration, serving as a club treasurer and a representative to the Estonian Olympic Committee. He died aged 41 in his native Tallinn in 1936 and was buried at Rahumäe Cemetery.
