= René Lorain =

French sprinter

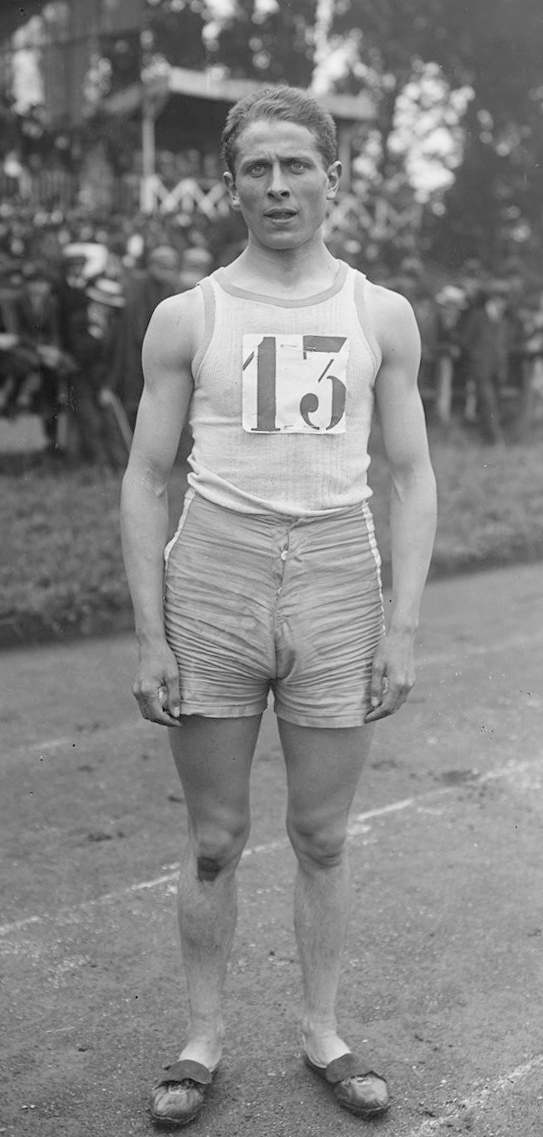
- René Lorain in 1920

Personal information
- Born: 19 March 1900 Rheims, France
- Died: 25 October 1984 (aged 84) Ouchamps, France
- Height: 1.75 m (5 ft 9 in)
- Weight: 68 kg (150 lb)

Sport
- Sport: Athletics
- Events: 100 m, 200 m
- Club: CASG Paris

Achievements and titles
- Personal bests: 100 m – 10.8 (1922); 200 m – 22.0 (1920)
Medal record
Representing France
Olympic Games
Silver medal – second place	1920 Antwerp	4×100 metre relay

René Lorain (19 March 1900 – 25 October 1984) was a French sprint runner. He competed at the 1920 Summer Olympics in the 100 m, 200 m and 4×100 metre relay events and won a silver medal in the relay; he failed to reach the finals in his individual events. Lorain won the national 100 m title in 1920 and finished second in 200 m in 1920 and 1923.
