= Nils Sandström =

Swedish sprinter

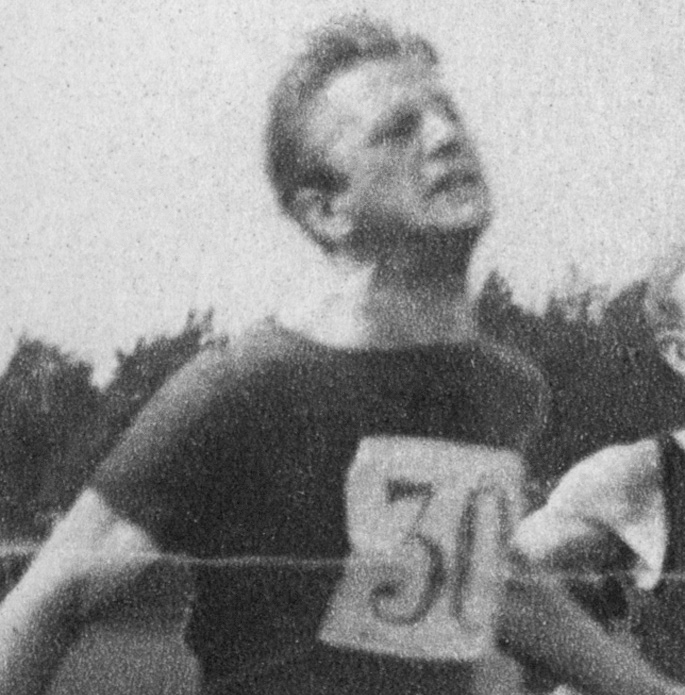

Personal information
- Born: 9 August 1893 Gothenburg, Sweden
- Died: 17 June 1973 (aged 79) Stockholm, Sweden

Sport
- Sport: Athletics
- Event: Sprint
- Club: SoIK Hellas

Achievements and titles
- Personal bests: 100 m – 10.7 (1921); 200 m – 22.2 (1922)
Medal record
Representing Sweden
Olympic Games
Bronze medal – third place	1920 Antwerp	4×100 m relay

Nils Sandström (9 August 1893 – 17 June 1973) was a Swedish sprinter who competed at the 1920 Summer Olympics. He won a bronze medal in the 4 × 100 m relay, but failed to reach the finals of individual 100 m and 200 m events.

Between 1917 and 1925, Sandström collected 23 medals at the Swedish Championships. He was the 1919–20 champion in the 100 m, and won eight titles in the 4 × 100 m (1919–21, 1923) and 4 × 400 m relays (1919–22). He never won the 200 m Swedish title despite holding the national record in this event from 1917 to 1920.
