= Harry van Rappard =

Dutch sprinter

Personal information
- Nationality: Dutch
- Born: 12 December 1897 Probolinggo, Indonesia
- Died: November 1982 Slidell, Louisiana, United States

Sport
- Sport: Sprinting
- Event: 100 metres

Harry van Rappard (12 December 1897 – November 1982) was a Dutch sprinter. He competed in the men's 100 metres at the 1920 Summer Olympics.
