= Dimitrios Karabatis =

Greek sprinter

Personal information
- Nationality: Greek
- Born: 22 September 1899 Smyrna, Ottoman Empire
- Died: 3 September 1964 (aged 64)

Sport
- Sport: Track and field
- Event(s): 100 metres, shot put, discuss

Dimitrios Karabatis (22 September 1899 – 3 September 1964) was a Greek athlete. He competed in the 1920, 1924 and the 1928 Summer Olympics.
