= Cor Wezepoel =

Dutch sprinter

Personal information
- Nationality: Dutch
- Born: 30 April 1896
- Died: 22 January 1954 (aged 57)

Sport
- Sport: Sprinting
- Event: 100 metres

Cor Wezepoel (30 April 1896 – 22 January 1954) was a Dutch sprinter. He competed in the men's 100 metres at the 1920 Summer Olympics.
