= Sven Malm =

Swedish sprinter

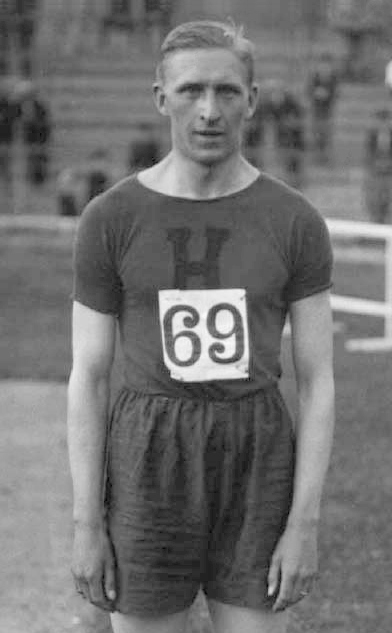

Personal information
- Born: 25 February 1894 Stockholm, Sweden
- Died: 26 November 1974 (aged 80) Stockholm, Sweden

Sport
- Sport: Athletics
- Events: Sprint, hurdles
- Club: SoIK Hellas

Achievements and titles
- Personal bests: 100 m – 10.8 (1920); 200 m – 22.0 (1920); 400 m – 49.8 (1920); 400 mH – 57.4 (1917)
Medal record
Representing Sweden
Olympic Games
Bronze medal – third place	1920 Antwerp	4×100 m relay

Sven August Malm (25 February 1894 – 26 November 1974) was a Swedish sprinter who competed at the 1920 Summer Olympics. He won a bronze medal in the 4 × 100 m and finished fifth in the 4 × 400 m relay, but failed to reach the finals of individual 100 m and 200 m events.

Malm won the 1917 Swedish title in the 400 m hurdles, but did not compete in this event at the Olympics. Between 1916 and 1923 he was either a winner or runner up at every Swedish 4 × 100 m relay championship.
