= Ahmed Khairy (athlete) =

Egyptian sprinter

Personal information
- Nationality: Egyptian

Sport
- Sport: Sprinting
- Event: 100 metres

Ahmed Khairy was an Egyptian sprinter. He competed in the men's 100 metres at the 1920 Summer Olympics.
