= Agne Holmström =

Swedish sprinter

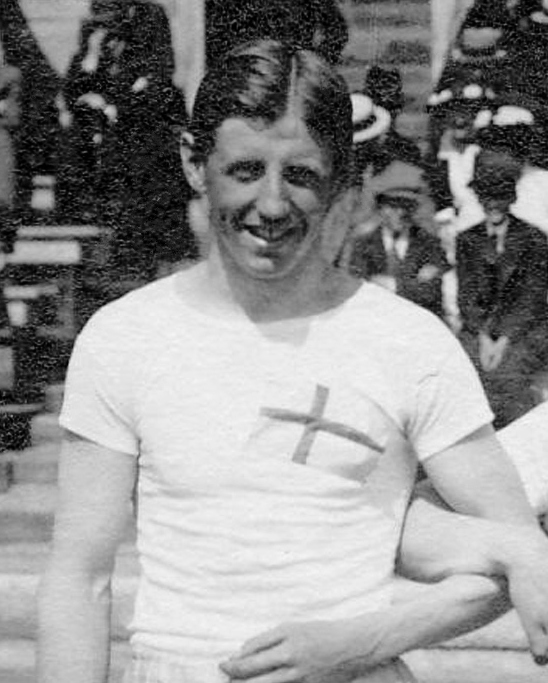

Personal information
- Born: 29 December 1893 Lund, Sweden
- Died: 22 October 1949 (aged 55) Stockholm, Sweden
- Height: 197 cm (6 ft 6 in)
- Weight: 84 kg (185 lb)

Sport
- Sport: Athletics
- Event: Sprint
- Club: Örgryte IS

Achievements and titles
- Personal bests: 100 m – 10.7 (1917); 200 m – 22.1 (1920); 400 m – 49.8 (1920); 400 mH – 57.4 (1917)
Medal record
Representing Sweden
Olympic Games
Bronze medal – third place	1920 Antwerp	4×100 m relay

Olof Agne Laurentius Holmström (29 December 1893 – 22 October 1949) was a Swedish sprinter who competed at the 1920 Summer Olympics. He won a bronze medal in the 4 × 100 m relay, but did not reach the finals of individual 100 m and 200 m events.

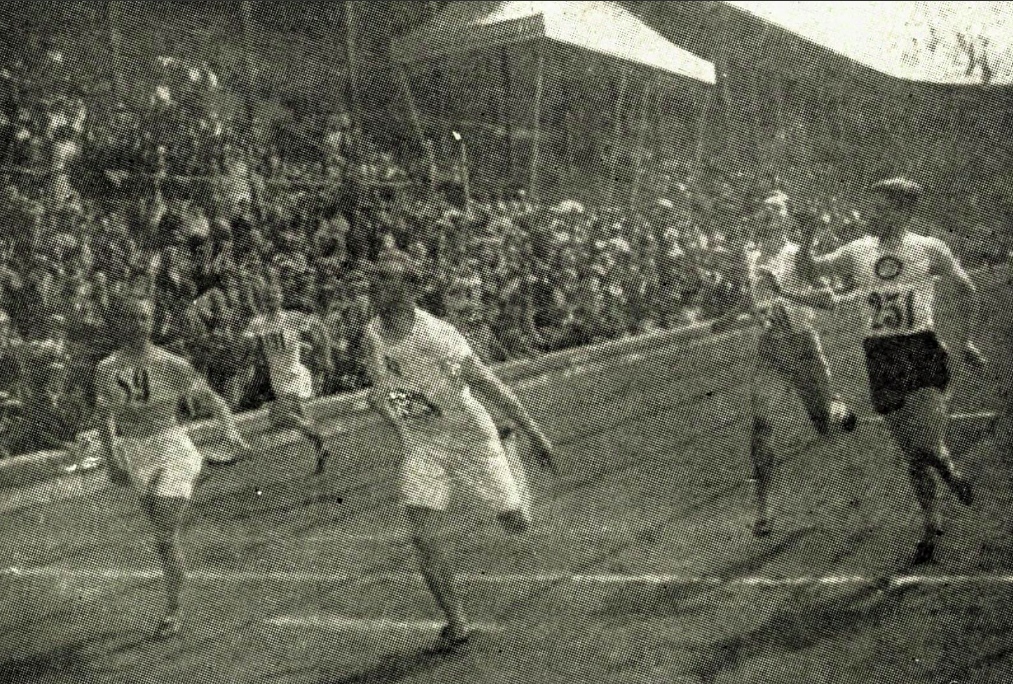
Holmström (right) gets third place in a 200 meter race at Stockholm Stadium during "Svenska Spelen" on 9 July 1916.

In 1917, Holmström won Swedish titles in the 100 m, 200 m, 4 × 100 m, and standing high jump events.

== Post-competition career and death ==
After retiring from competitions, he worked as a sports teacher and, between 1930 and 1949, was secretary-general of the Swedish Gymnastics Federation. He was responsible for the Lingiadem, major gymnastic events that were held in Stockholm in 1939 and 1949 in honor of the founder of Swedish gymnastics, Pehr Henrik Ling. The 1949 event was a sporting success, but a financial fiasco, which resulted in criticism of Holmström. Holmström killed himself soon afterwards, at the age of 55.
