= René Tirard =

French sprinter

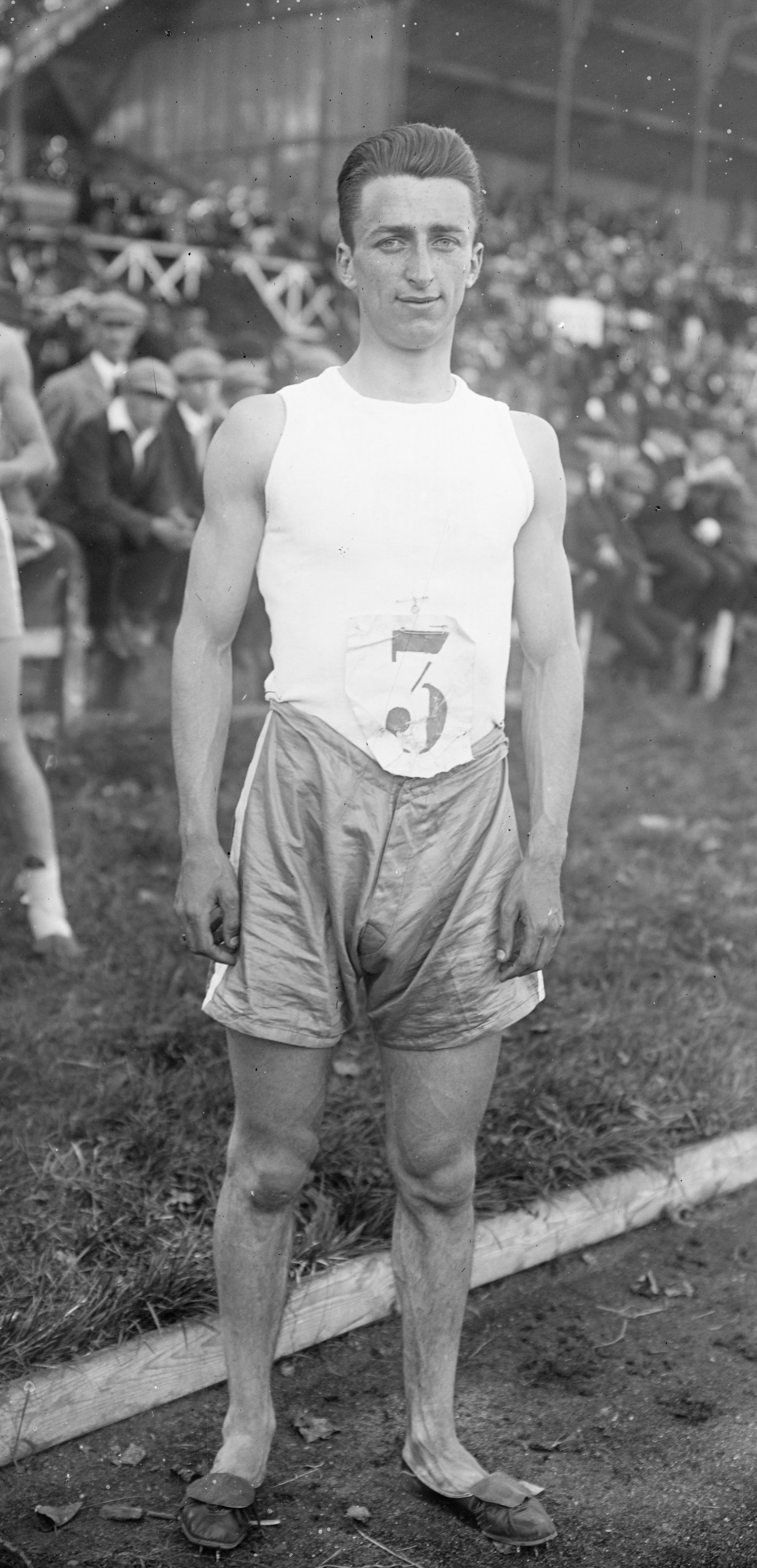
- René Tirard in 1920

Personal information
- Born: 20 July 1899 Le Havre, France
- Died: 12 August 1977 (aged 78) Clichy, Hauts-de-Seine, France
- Height: 1.80 m (5 ft 11 in)
- Weight: 68 kg (150 lb)

Sport
- Sport: Athletics
- Events: 100 m, 200 m
- Club: CASG Paris

Achievements and titles
- Personal bests: 100 m – 11.0 (1919); 200 m – 22.2 (1920)
Medal record
Representing France
Olympic Games
| Silver medal – second place | 1920 Antwerp | 4×100 metre relay |

René Tirard (20 July 1899 – 12 August 1977) was a French sprint runner. He competed at the 1920 Summer Olympics in the 100 m, 200 m and 4×100 metre relay events and won a silver medal in the relay; he failed to reach the finals in his individual events.
