= Jack Oosterlaak =

South African sprinter

Personal information
- Born: 15 January 1896 Wellington, Cape Colony
- Died: 5 June 1968 (aged 72) Pretoria, Transvaal, South Africa

Sport
- Sport: Athletics
- Event: Sprints
Medal record
Men's athletics
Representing South Africa
Silver medal – second place	1920 Antwerp	4x400 metre relay

Justus Kinloch Ayres Oosterlaak also known as Jack Oosterlaak (15 January 1896 – 5 June 1968), was a South African athlete who competed in the 1920 Summer Olympics.

== Career ==
Oosterlaak finished third behind Harry Edward in the 100 yards event at the British 1920 AAA Championships.

The following month at the 1920 Olympic Games held in Antwerp, Belgium, he competed in the 4 x 400-metre relay where he won the silver medal with his teammates Harry Davel, Clarence Oldfield and Bevil Rudd.
