= Giovanni-Battista Orlandi =

Italian sprinter

Personal information
- Nationality: Italian
- Born: 27 January 1898 Milan, Italy
- Died: 1977 (aged 78–79)

Sport
- Sport: Sprinting
- Event: 100 metres

Giovanni-Battista Orlandi (27 January 1898 – 1977) was an Italian sprinter. He competed in the men's 100 metres at the 1920 Summer Olympics.
