= Jacobus Bukes =

South African sprinter

Personal information
- Nationality: South African
- Born: 12 March 1896 Kroonstad, Orange Free State
- Died: 11 December 1953 (aged 57)

Sport
- Sport: Sprinting
- Event: 100 metres

Jacobus Bukes (12 March 1896 – 11 December 1953) was a South African sprinter. He competed in the men's 100 metres at the 1920 Summer Olympics.
