= Francis Irvine =

South African sprinter

Personal information
- Nationality: South African
- Born: 16 March 1899 Johannesburg, South African Republic
- Died: 16 December 1969 (aged 70)

Sport
- Sport: Sprinting
- Event: 200 metres

Francis Irvine (16 March 1899 – 16 December 1969) was a South African sprinter. He competed in the men's 200 metres at the 1920 Summer Olympics.
