= Harry Edward =

British Olympian

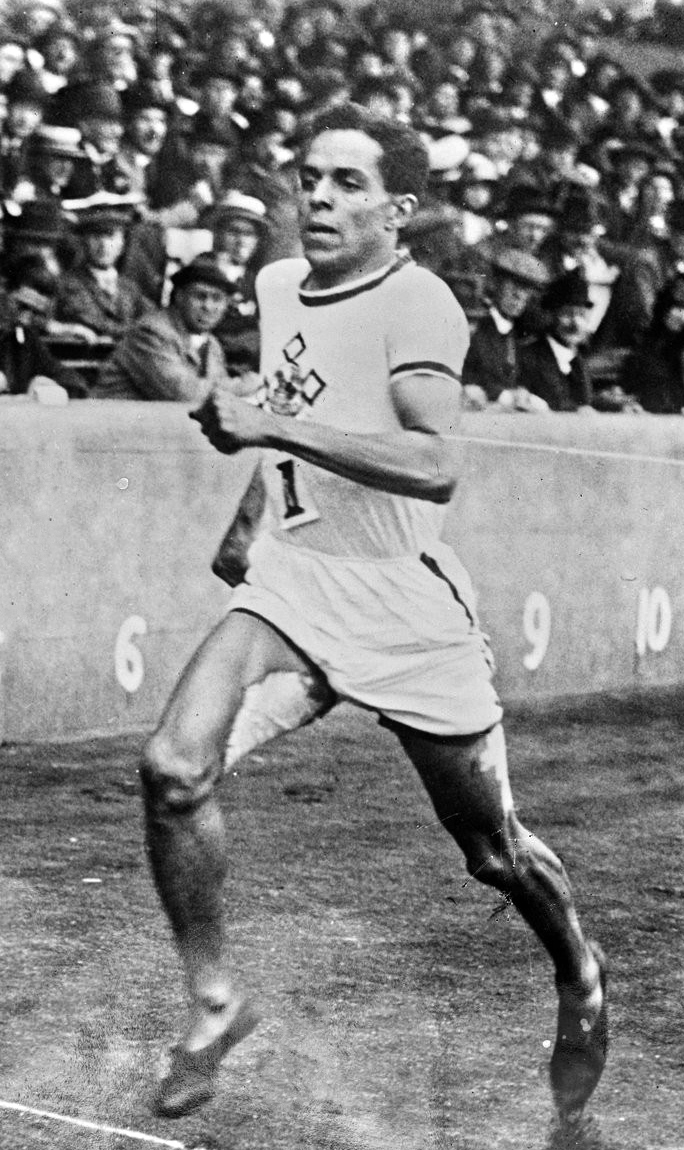
- Harry Edward in 1922

Personal information
- Born: 15 April 1898 Berlin, Germany
- Died: 8 July 1973 (aged 75) Augsburg, Germany

Sport
- Sport: Athletics
- Events: 100 m, 200 m
- Club: Polytechnic Harriers, London

Achievements and titles
- Personal bests: 100 m – 10.8 (1920); 200 m – 21.5 (1920)
Medal record
Representing Great Britain
Olympic Games
Bronze medal – third place	1920 Antwerp	100 metres
Bronze medal – third place	1920 Antwerp	200 metres

Harry Francis Vincent Edward (15 April 1898 – 8 July 1973), known as Harry Edward, was a German-British athlete in track; in 1920 he was Britain's first black Olympian and the first black person to win Olympic medals. He represented the UK and competed in the 100 and 200 m 1920 Summer Olympics in Antwerp, winning bronze medals in both events. Because he injured himself during the 200 m final, he withdrew from the 4 × 100 m relay.

Born to German and Dominican parents, and raised in Berlin, Edward was classified as a British subject and enemy alien because his father was a British subject from Dominica, a British colony. During the First World War, Edward was imprisoned for nearly four years in a civilian detention camp from 1915 to 1918. After being released, he migrated to the United Kingdom and settled in London. This was his base for athletic competition through 1922.

Invited to compete at Yankee Stadium in New York City, Edward emigrated to the United States in 1923. Settling in New York after some time in Philadelphia, Pennsylvania, he participated in the Harlem Renaissance and its political and cultural milieu. He worked for the City of New York for much of his career, and also volunteered for the United Nations. Later in life he wrote a memoir, When I Passed the Statue of Liberty I Became Black, discussing his life on both sides of the Atlantic. It was rediscovered among his papers by British writer and filmmaker Neil Duncanson in the 21st century, and edited by him for publication by Yale University Press in 2024.

== Personal life ==
Born in Berlin, Vincent Franz Harry Edward, called Harry, was the only son of a Dominican father and German mother, a piano teacher. As a youth, his father had left the poverty of the colony of Dominica by working as a ship's cabin boy and crossed the Atlantic Ocean. He stayed in Germany, where he first worked in a circus. Later he was a maitre d' in various Berlin restaurants. He was always considered a British subject, as were his children.

Edward had one sister, Irene. Brought up and educated in Germany, by his teen years he spoke German, French, and English. He also was noted for his athletic and academic abilities.

Because of the father's birth in Dominica, he and his children were considered British subjects. Prussia did not have a process of naturalization for immigrants. When the First World War started, from 1915 the younger Edward was classified as a British enemy alien and detained with other civilians at Ruhleben internment camp in Germany for the majority of the war. Most of the thousands of internees were British subjects, and Edward made friends that carried over when he went to England.

Initially Edward could participate in sports days and made lasting friendships. An extensive community with different cultural events developed in the camp: theatre, music, a branch of the Royal Horticultural Society and other organizations. Especially during the end of the war as Germany's losses accumulated, conditions became poor in the camp. The food was worse, as was the attitude of the Germans to the prisoners.

After being released, Edward emigrated to England, settling in London. With qualifications from the camp, he became a teacher of French and German. He also became involved in track competition. (See below for athletic career.)

Edward married twice: in 1922 to Antoinette (Kohler) Regner, a Swiss national who already had a son. The marriage failed in 1931, years after they had emigrated to the United States in 1923. He married again, to Gladys Hirst in 1938. They had a son together.

In 1973 Edward died in Augsburg, Germany. He suffered a heart attack when visiting his sister there.

== Athletic career ==
In June 1914, when Edward was 16, he competed in an athletics meeting held in the Berlin stadium built for the 1916 Olympics. He won the 200m and placed second in the 100m to the German champion.

During the war, Edward was held in a civilian detention or prisoner of war camp, because he, like his father, was considered a British subject and enemy alien. After Edward was released from the camp in late 1918, he emigrated to Great Britain to take up track again. In London, because he had gained qualifications while in the camp, he also became a teacher of German and French.

He became involved with amateur athletics again. He was successful at his first track meeting at Stamford Bridge. He was so successful at the sprint events at the Amateur Athletics Association meeting in 1920 that he was selected for the British 100m, 200m and sprint relay teams at the 1920 Antwerp Olympic Games, the first black Olympian. He reached the final of the 100m and 200m and gained a bronze medal in each, becoming the first black person to gain an Olympic medal. The start of the 100m race was confused, and several competitors were left at the starting line.

Edward became the national 100 yards champion and the national 220 yards champion, after winning the AAA Championships title at the 1920 AAA Championships. The following year he successfully defended both of his titles at the 1921 AAA Championships and then remarkably added the 440 yards AAA title to a third successive 100 and 220 yards title at the 1922 AAA Championships. King George V personally congratulated him for his success.

His records had attracted American attention. In 1923 Edward was invited to compete at New York City's Yankee Stadium, so he emigrated to the USA for its opportunities. However his athletics performance in the USA was less successful.

== Life in the United States ==
He moved to Philadelphia for a period, returning to New York City after he had divorced and remarried. He initially worked as an administrator in the Roosevelt administration's Federal Theatre Project, part of the Works Progress Administration program to employ actors, artists, set designers, writers and other creative people. In 1936 his group produced the first staging of Macbeth with a black cast; it was directed by John Houseman and Orson Welles.

During the Second World War Edward worked for the Office of Price Administration and organized rationing. When the war ended, he worked for the United Nations Relief and Rehabilitation Administration and was sent to Greece.

He subsequently worked for the New York City Employment Office until he retired in the late 1960s. He continued with the UN as a volunteer, including working abroad. He went to Vietnam to initiate a US-sponsored foster-children programme. He also greeted and worked with dignitaries visiting the UN and the New York mayor's office.

== Legacy ==
The New York Times gave Edward a five-paragraph obituary, and more was published by the New York Amsterdam News. But his passing went without acknowledgement in the UK. His decades out of the country caused his achievements to be overlooked.

The Harry Edward Papers, including correspondence, photographs, and other personal papers, are curated at the Amistad Research Center in New Orleans. They include his memoir When I Passed the Statue of Liberty I Became Black, which was effectively lost for decades. For a more complete description, see the finding aid for the collection.

The memoir was rediscovered in the Edward papers by Neil Duncanson, a British writer and documentary filmmaker, in the course of research for another book on 100 meter winners. He edited the memoir, which was published by Yale University Press in February 2024.
