= Diego Ordóñez =

Spanish sprinter

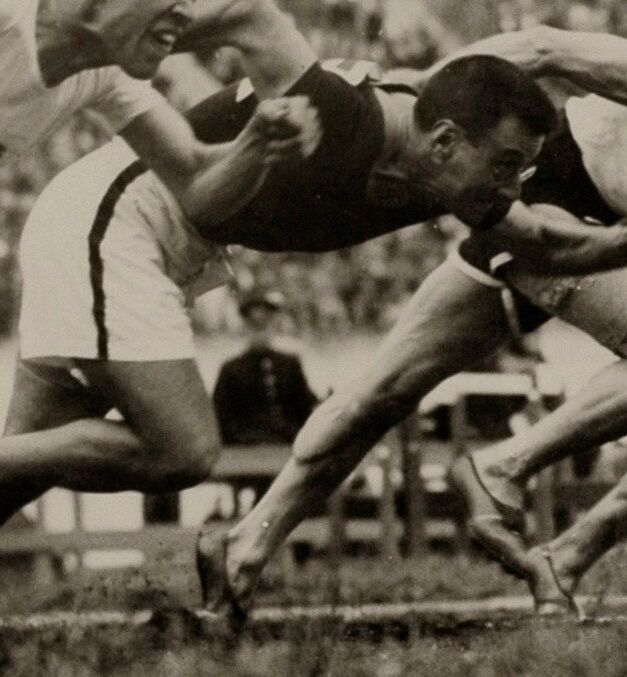
- Diego Ordóñez in 1928

Personal information
- Nationality: Spanish
- Born: 7 November 1903 Madrid, Spain
- Died: 14 July 1990 (aged 86)

Sport
- Sport: Track and field
- Event(s): 100m, 200m

Diego Ordóñez Arcauz (7 November 1903 – 14 July 1990) was a Spanish sprinter. He competed at the 1920, 1924 and 1928 Summer Olympics. He was the flag bearer for Spain in the 1928 Olympics opening ceremony.
