= Félix Mendizábal =

Spanish athlete

Personal information
- Nationality: Spanish
- Born: 7 March 1891 Usurbil, Spain
- Died: 15 July 1959 (aged 68) San Sebastián, Spain

Sport
- Sport: Track and field
- Event(s): 100m, 200m

Félix Mendizábal Mendiburu (7 March 1891 – 15 July 1959) was a Spanish sprinter. He competed at the 1920 and the 1924 Summer Olympics. At the 1924 Games, he was also the flag bearer.
