= Paul Brochart =

Belgian sprinter

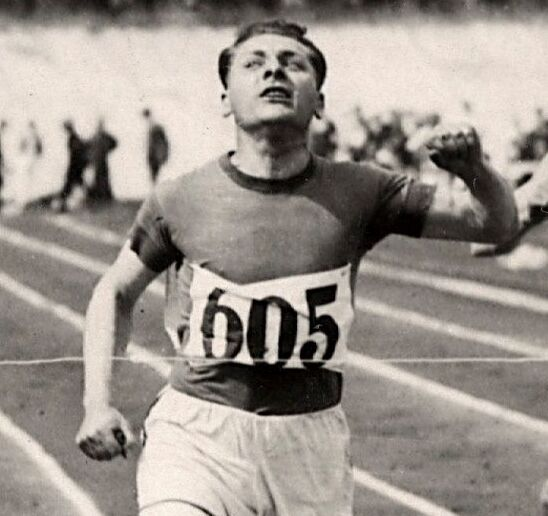
- Paul Brochart in 1928

Personal information
- Nationality: Belgian
- Born: 22 April 1899
- Died: 22 December 1971 (aged 72)

Sport
- Sport: Track and field
- Event(s): 100m, 200m

Paul Brochart (22 April 1899 – 22 December 1971) was a Belgian sprinter. He competed at the 1920, 1924 and 1928 Summer Olympics.
