= Bjarne Guldager =

Norwegian sprinter (1897–1971)

Bjarne Guldager (14 November 1897 – 29 January 1971) was a Norwegian sprinter. He was born and died in Oslo and represented Ørnulf IF in Kristiania.

Guldager participated in both 100 and 200 metres at the 1920 Summer Olympics, but did not progress from the heats in either event. He was also a part of the 4 x 100 metres relay team that was disqualified. He became Norwegian champion in 100 metres in the years 1921-1925 and in 200 metres in 1921 and 1925.

His personal best time was 10.8 seconds, achieved in August 1921 in Fredrikstad. The same day, he ran a career best of 22.3 seconds in the 200 metres.
