= Athletics at the 1920 Summer Olympics – Men's 400 metres =

Men's 400 metres at the Games of the VII Olympiad
- Venue: Olympisch Stadion
- Dates: August 19, 1920 (round 1 & quarterfinals); August 20, 1920 (semifinals & final)
- Competitors: 37 from 16 nations
- Winning time: 49.6

Medalists
1st place, gold medalist(s)		Bevil Rudd	South Africa
2nd place, silver medalist(s)		Guy Butler	Great Britain
3rd place, bronze medalist(s)		Nils Engdahl	Sweden

The men's 400 metres event was part of the track and field athletics programme at the 1920 Summer Olympics. The competition was held on Thursday, August 19, 1920, and on Friday, August 20, 1920. 37 runners from 16 nations competed. No nation had more than 4 runners, suggesting the limit had been reduced from the 12 maximum in force in 1908 and 1912. The event was won by Bevil Rudd of South Africa, the nation's first title (and first medal) in the event. Nils Engdahl's bronze was Sweden's first medal in the 400 metres.

== Background ==
This was the sixth appearance of the event, which is one of 12 athletics events to have been held at every Summer Olympics. The only returning finalist from the pre-war 1912 Games was Ted Meredith of the United States, who had finished 4th in Stockholm and who had broken the world record in 1916. Other favored entrants included 1919 AAU champion Frank Shea of the United States, 1919 AAA champion Guy Butler of Great Britain, and 1920 AAA champion Bevil Rudd of South Africa.

Czechoslovakia, Egypt, Estonia, Finland, India, Luxembourg, and Spain appeared in the event for the first time. The United States made its sixth appearance in the event, the only nation to compete in it at every Olympic Games to that point.

== Competition format ==
Despite the smaller field than 1912 (37 athletes, down from 49), the competition expanded from three rounds to four. The first round had 10 heats, with 3 or 4 runners each. The top two runners in each heat advanced to the quarterfinals. There were 4 quarterfinals, with 5 runners in each; the top three athletes in each heat advanced to the semifinals. The semifinals featured 2 heats of 6 runners each. Again, the top three runners in each semifinal heat advanced, making a six-man final.

== Records ==
These were the standing world and Olympic records (in seconds) prior to the 1920 Summer Olympics.

World record	Ted Meredith (USA)	47.4(*)	Cambridge, United States	27 May 1916
Olympic record	Charles Reidpath (USA)	48.2	Stockholm, Sweden	13 July 1912

(*) 440 yards (= 402.34 m)

No records were set during this event.

== Schedule ==
Date	Time	Round
Thursday, 19 August 1920	09:30; 15:15	Round 1 Quarterfinals
Friday, 20 August 1920	14:00; 16:15	Semifinals; Final

== Results ==
Times were generally only published for the winners of each heat. Some of the times listed below are estimates based on contemporary reports of the races.

=== Round 1 ===
==== Heat 1 ====
Rank	Athlete	Nation	Time	Notes
1	Robert Lindsay	Great Britain	52.0	Q
2	Clarence Oldfield	South Africa	52.2	Q
3	Tolly Bolin	Sweden	52.6	
—	Émile Barral	Monaco	DNS	
—	Fritiof Andersen	Denmark	DNS	
—	Jean Colbach	Luxembourg	DNS	

==== Heat 2 ====
Rank	Athlete	Nation	Time	Notes
1	Gaston Féry	France	51.2	Q
2	John Ainsworth-Davis	Great Britain	51.5	Q
3	Karel Frankenstein	Czechoslovakia	52.5	
4	Francis Irvine	South Africa	52.5	
—	William Hunt	Australia	DNS	

==== Heat 3 ====
Rank	Athlete	Nation	Time	Notes
1	Frank Shea	United States	50.8	Q
2	Henry Dafel	South Africa	51.2	Q
3	Sven Krokström	Sweden	51.6	
—	Josef Teplý	Czechoslovakia	DNS	

==== Heat 4 ====
Rank	Athlete	Nation	Time	Notes
1	Ted Meredith	United States	51.6	Q
2	Géo André	France	52.3	Q
3	Giuseppe Bernardoni	Italy	52.8	
—	Dimitrios Karabatis	Greece	DNS	
—	Gensabulo Noguchi	Japan	DNS	

==== Heat 5 ====
Rank	Athlete	Nation	Time	Notes
1	Bevil Rudd	South Africa	51.6	Q
2	Erik Wilén	Finland	52.0	Q
3	Reinhold Saulmann	Estonia	52.4	^{a}
4	Giovanni Tosi	Italy	52.6	
—	August Sørensen	Denmark	DNS	

a. Reinhold Saulmann's time is given as 52.2 by contemporary Estonian reports.

==== Heat 6 ====
Rank	Athlete	Nation	Time	Notes
1	Robert Emery	United States	52.6	Q
2	Guy Butler	Great Britain	53.2	Q
3	Karel Přibyl	Czechoslovakia	54.0	
4	Jules Migeot	Belgium	55.1	
—	Shinichi Yamaoka	Japan	DNS	

==== Heat 7 ====
Rank	Athlete	Nation	Time	Notes
1	George Schiller	United States	50.4	Q
2	Nils Engdahl	Sweden	50.6	Q
3	Maurice Delvart	France	51.0	
4	Einar Mangset	Norway	51.4	
—	Eduard Hašek	Czechoslovakia	DNS	

==== Heat 8 ====
Rank	Athlete	Nation	Time	Notes
1	Eric Sundblad	Sweden	52.0	Q
2	Hec Phillips	Canada	52.3	Q
3	Agide Simonazzi	Italy	53.0	
4	Purma Bannerjee	India	53.1	
—	Paul Hammer	Luxembourg	DNS	

==== Heat 9 ====
Rank	Athlete	Nation	Time	Notes
1	Omer Corteyn	Belgium	52.2	Q
2	Hedges Worthington-Eyre	Great Britain	52.6	Q
3	Jean Proess	Luxembourg	53.2	
4	José García Lorenzana	Spain	53.4	
—	Johannes Villemson	Estonia	DNS	

==== Heat 10 ====
Rank	Athlete	Nation	Time	Notes
1	François Morren	Belgium	51.6	Q
2	Miguel García Onsalo	Spain	52.0	Q
3	Eugène Bayon	France	52.4	
—	Ahmed Khairy	Egypt	DNF	
—	Ernesto Ambrosini	Italy	DNS	

=== Quarterfinals ===
==== Quarterfinal 1 ====
Rank	Athlete	Nation	Time	Notes
1	Nils Engdahl	Sweden	50.4	Q
2	John Ainsworth-Davis	Great Britain	50.7	Q
3	Robert Emery	United States	50.7	Q
4	François Morren	Belgium	50.8	
5	Clarence Oldfield	South Africa	51.1	

==== Quarterfinal 2 ====
Rank	Athlete	Nation	Time	Notes
1	Gaston Féry	France	50.6	Q
2	Guy Butler	Great Britain	50.7	Q
3	Ted Meredith	United States	50.8	Q
4	Erik Wilén	Finland	51.0	
5	Hec Phillips	Canada	51.4	

==== Quarterfinal 3 ====
Rank	Athlete	Nation	Time	Notes
1	Henry Dafel	South Africa	50.8	Q
2	George Schiller	United States	51.1	Q
3	Eric Sundblad	Sweden	51.2	Q
4	Robert Lindsay	Great Britain	51.6	
5	Omer Corteyn	Belgium	52.0	

==== Quarterfinal 4 ====
Rank	Athlete	Nation	Time	Notes
1	Frank Shea	United States	51.0	Q
2	Bevil Rudd	South Africa	51.3	Q
3	Géo André	France	51.6	Q
4	Miguel García Onsalo	Spain	52.8	
5	Hedges Worthington-Eyre	Great Britain	53.2	

=== Semifinals ===
==== Semifinal 1 ====
Rank	Athlete	Nation	Time	Notes
1	Nils Engdahl	Sweden	49.4	Q
2	Bevil Rudd	South Africa	49.7	Q
3	John Ainsworth-Davis	Great Britain	49.9	Q
4	Robert Emery	United States	50.2	
5	George Schiller	United States		
6	Gaston Féry	France	51.0	

==== Semifinal 2 ====
Rank	Athlete	Nation	Time	Notes
1	Frank Shea	United States	50.0	Q
2	Guy Butler	Great Britain	50.2	Q
3	Henry Dafel	South Africa	50.4	Q
4	Ted Meredith	United States	50.6	
5	Géo André	France	51.6	
—	Eric Sundblad	Sweden	DNF	

=== Final ===
Rank	Lane	Athlete	Nation	Time
1st place, gold medalist(s)	1	Bevil Rudd	South Africa	49.6
2nd place, silver medalist(s)	5	Guy Butler	Great Britain	50.1
3rd place, bronze medalist(s)	6	Nils Engdahl	Sweden	50.2
4	3	Frank Shea	United States	50.4
5	4	John Ainsworth-Davis	Great Britain	50.6
6	2	Henry Dafel	South Africa	50.6
