= Athletics at the 1920 Summer Olympics – Men's 800 metres =

Men's 800 metres at the Games of the VII Olympiad
- Venue: Olympisch Stadion
- Dates: August 15, 1920 (round 1); August 17, 1920 (semifinals & final)
- Competitors: 40 from 17 nations
- Winning time: 1:53.4

Medalists
1st place, gold medalist(s)		Albert Hill	Great Britain
2nd place, silver medalist(s)		Earl Eby	United States
3rd place, bronze medalist(s)		Bevil Rudd	South Africa

The men's 800 metres event was part of the track and field athletics programme at the 1920 Summer Olympics. The competition was held from Sunday, August 15, 1920, to Tuesday, August 17, 1920. Forty runners from 17 nations competed. No nation had more than 4 runners, suggesting the limit had been reduced from the 12 maximum in force in 1908 and 1912. The event was won by Albert Hill of Great Britain, snapping a three-Games streak of American victories and starting a four-Games streak of British wins. Bevil Rudd, the 400 metres winner in 1920, took bronze to give South Africa its first medal in the 800 metres.

== Background ==
This was the sixth appearance of the event, which is one of 12 athletics events to have been held at every Summer Olympics. None of the pre-war finalists from 1908 returned to the 800 metres (champion and world record holder Ted Meredith ran only in the 400 metres in 1920). Contenders included Bevil Rudd of South Africa, the 1920 AAA champion; Albert Hill of Great Britain, the 1919 AAA champion, and Earl Eby of the United States, the 1920 U.S. champion.

Belgium, Czechoslovakia, Estonia, Japan, Luxembourg, Monaco, Spain, and Switzerland appeared in the event for the first time. Great Britain and the United States each made their fifth appearance, tied for the most among all nations.

== Competition format ==
The competition used the three-round format introduced in 1912, though the final expanded to nine runners for the first time. There were five quarterfinal heats of between 7 and 9 athletes each; the top four runners in each heat advanced to the semifinals. There were three semifinals with 6 or 7 athletes each; the top three runners in each semifinal advanced to the nine-man final.

== Records ==
These were the standing world and Olympic records (in minutes) prior to the 1920 Summer Olympics.

World record	Ted Meredith (USA)	1:51.9	Stockholm, Sweden	8 July 1912
Olympic record	Ted Meredith (USA)	1:51.9	Stockholm, Sweden	8 July 1912

No world or Olympic records were set during the competition.

== Schedule ==
The semifinals and final were held on the same day, the final essentially immediately following the semifinals.

Date	Time	Round
Sunday, 15 August 1920	16:00	Round 1
Tuesday, 17 August 1920	16:15; 16:45	Semifinals; Final

== Results ==
Times were generally only published for the winners of each heat. Some of the times listed below are estimates based on contemporary reports of the races.

=== Round 1 ===
==== Heat 1 ====
Rank	Athlete	Nation	Time	Notes
1	Edgar Mountain	Great Britain	1:57.6	Q
2	Giuseppe Bonini	Italy	1:58.8	Q
3	Fernand Bauduin	France	1:59.1	Q
4	James Doig	South Africa	1:59.6	Q
5	Joseph Vander Wee	Belgium	2:00.0	
6	Saburo Hasumi	Japan	2:02.2	
7	José Luis Grasset	Spain		
8	Karel Přibyl	Czechoslovakia		
9	Jean Proess	Luxembourg	2:12	

==== Heat 2 ====
Rank	Athlete	Nation	Time	Notes
1	Bevil Rudd	South Africa	1:55.0	Q
2	Albert Hill	Great Britain	1:56.2	Q
3	Earl Eby	United States	1:56.8	Q
4	Paul Esparbès	France	1:58.0	Q
5	Hec Phillips	Canada		
6	Odolf Larsen	Norway	2:01.6	
7	Léoncé Oleffe	Belgium		
8	Elis Johansson	Sweden		
—	Arturo Porro	Italy		

==== Heat 3 ====
Rank	Athlete	Nation	Time	Notes
1	Philip Noel-Baker	Great Britain	1:56.0	Q
2	Donald Scott	United States	1:56.9	Q
3	Tolly Bolin	Sweden	1:57.8	Q
4	Adje Paulen	Netherlands	1:58.4	Q
5	Paul Martin	Switzerland	1:59.8	
6	Karel Frankenstein	Czechoslovakia		
—	Agide Simonazzi	Italy		
—	Panagiotis Retelas	Greece		

==== Heat 4 ====
Rank	Athlete	Nation	Time	Notes
1	Robert Goullieux	France	1:58.8	Q
2	Thomas Campbell	United States	1:59.1	Q
3	Henry Dafel	South Africa	1:59.2	Q
4	Ernesto Ambrosini	Italy	1:59.4	Q
5	Nils Engdahl	Sweden	2:00.0	
6	Johannes Villemson	Estonia	2:00.2	
7	Josef Teplý	Czechoslovakia	2:00.6	
—	Jean Delarge	Belgium	DNF	

==== Heat 5 ====
Rank	Athlete	Nation	Time	Notes
1	Sven Lundgren	Sweden	2:00.6	Q
2	Albert Sprott	United States	2:01.5	Q
3	Miguel García Onsalo	Spain	2:02.2	Q
4	Kléber Argouac'h	France	2:02.5	Q
5	Jaroslav Procházka	Czechoslovakia		
6	Henri Godin	Belgium		
7	Émile Barral	Monaco		
—	Erkka Wilén	Finland	DNS	

=== Semifinals ===
==== Semifinal 1 ====
Rank	Athlete	Nation	Time	Notes
1	Donald Scott	United States	1:57.2	Q
2	Edgar Mountain	Great Britain	1:58.2	Q
3	Albert Sprott	United States	1:58.6	Q
4	Ernesto Ambrosini	Italy	1:59.5	
5	Robert Goullieux	France	1:59.6	
6	Miguel García Onsalo	Spain	2:01.2	
7	James Doig	South Africa	2:01.5	

==== Semifinal 2 ====
Rank	Athlete	Nation	Time	Notes
1	Bevil Rudd	South Africa	1:57.0	Q
2	Thomas Campbell	United States	1:57.6	Q
3	Adje Paulen	Netherlands	1:57.8	Q
4	Sven Lundgren	Sweden	1:58.4	
5	Giuseppe Bonini	Italy	1:59.0	
6	Kléber Argouac'h	France	1:59.6	
—	Philip Noel-Baker	Great Britain	DNS	

==== Semifinal 3 ====
Rank	Athlete	Nation	Time	Notes
1	Albert Hill	Great Britain	1:56.4	Q
2	Earl Eby	United States	1:57.0	Q
3	Paul Esparbès	France	1:57.3	Q
4	Tolly Bolin	Sweden	1:57.5	
5	Fernand Bauduin	France	2:01	
6	Henry Dafel	South Africa		

=== Final ===
The first lap was led by Eby and Scott with Eby holding the lead at the halfway point of the race passing the 400m mark in 54.2 seconds. As the 2nd and final lap began Rudd took the lead and held it until the finishing straight where Hill and Eby passed him and battled each other until the end. Hill pulled ahead in the final meters to win Great Britain its 3rd gold medal in the 800m.

Rank	Athlete	Nation	Time
1st place, gold medalist(s)	Albert Hill	Great Britain	1:53.4
2nd place, silver medalist(s)	Earl Eby	United States	1:53.6
3rd place, bronze medalist(s)	Bevil Rudd	South Africa	1:53.6
4	Edgar Mountain	Great Britain	1:53.7
5	Donald Scott	United States	1:54.6
6	Albert Sprott	United States	1:55.4
7	Adje Paulen	Netherlands	1:56.3
8	Paul Esparbès	France	1:58.6
—	Thomas Campbell	United States	DNF
