= Athletics at the 1920 Summer Olympics – Men's 4 × 400 metres relay =

Men's 4 × 400 metres relay at the Games of the VII Olympiad
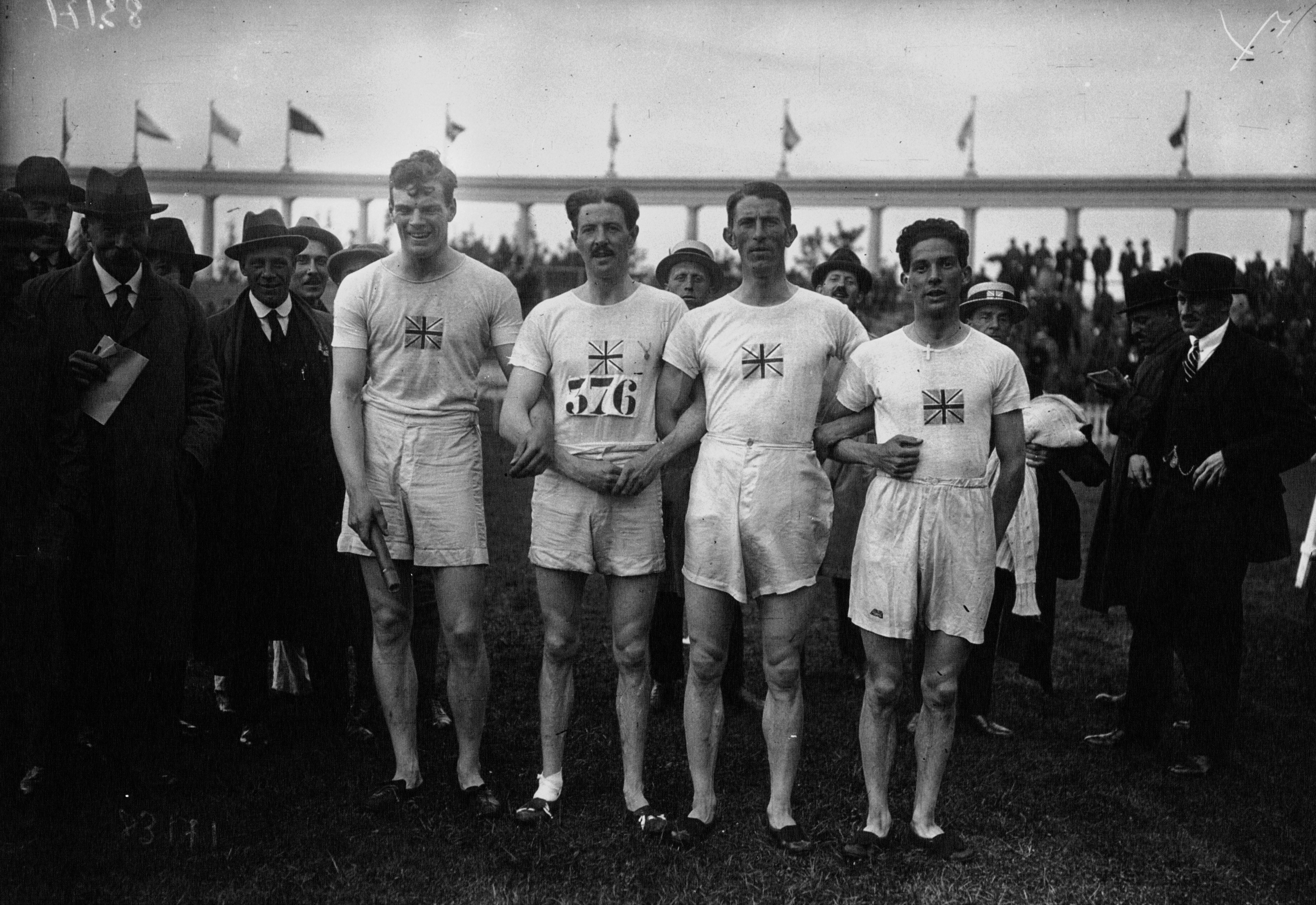
- The British team, left-right: Butler, Ainsworth-Davis, Lindsay, Griffiths
- Venue: Olympisch Stadion
- Dates: August 22–23, 1920
- Competitors: 24 from 6 nations

Medalists
1st place, gold medalist(s)		John Ainsworth-Davis, Guy Butler, Cecil Griffiths, Robert Lindsay; Great Britain
2nd place, silver medalist(s)		Henry Dafel, Clarence Oldfield, Jack Oosterlaak, Bevil Rudd; South Africa
3rd place, bronze medalist(s)		Géo André, Maurice Delvart, André Devaux, Gaston Féry; France

The men's 4 × 400 metres relay event was part of the track and field athletics programme at the 1920 Summer Olympics. The competition was held on Sunday, August 22, 1920, and on Monday, August 23, 1920. Twenty-four runners from six nations competed.

== Records ==
These were the standing world and Olympic records (in minutes) prior to the 1920 Summer Olympics.

World record	3:16.6	(United States) Mel Sheppard (United States) Edward Lindberg (United States) Ted Meredith (United States) Charles Reidpath	Stockholm (SWE)	July 15, 1912
Olympic record	3:16.6	(United States) Mel Sheppard (United States) Edward Lindberg (United States) Ted Meredith (United States) Charles Reidpath	Stockholm (SWE)	July 15, 1912

== Results ==
=== Semifinals ===
The semi-finals were held on Sunday, August 22, 1920.

Semifinal 1

Place	Athletes	Time	Qual.
1	Jules Migeot, Omer Corteyn, Omer Smet, François Morren (BEL)	3:38.8	Q
2	Cecil Griffiths, Robert Lindsay, John Ainsworth-Davis, Guy Butler (GBR)	3:40.9	Q
3	Géo André, Gaston Féry, Maurice Delvart, André Devaux (FRA)	3:46.6	Q

Semifinal 2

Place	Athletes	Time	Qual.
1	Henry Dafel, Clarence Oldfield, Jack Oosterlaak, Bevil Rudd (RSA)	3:38.6	Q
2	George Schiller, George Bretnall, Ted Meredith, Frank Shea (USA)	3:40.7	Q
3	Sven Krokström, Sven Malm, Eric Sundblad, Nils Engdahl (SWE)	3:46.4	Q

=== Final ===
The final was held on Monday, August 23, 1920.

Place	Athletes	Time
1	Cecil Griffiths, Robert Lindsay, John Ainsworth-Davis, Guy Butler (GBR)	3:22.2
2	Henry Dafel, Clarence Oldfield, Jack Oosterlaak, Bevil Rudd (RSA)	3:23.0
3	Géo André, Gaston Féry, Maurice Delvart, André Devaux (FRA)	3:23.5
4	George Schiller, George Bretnall, Ted Meredith, Frank Shea (USA)	3:23.6
5	Sven Krokström, Sven Malm, Eric Sundblad, Nils Engdahl (SWE)	3:24.3
6	Jules Migeot, Omer Corteyn, Omer Smet, François Morren (BEL)	3:24.9
