= Teply =

Teply may refer to:

- Teplý, a Czech surname
- Tyoply, various Russian localities sometimes transliterated Teply
