= Robert Emery =

Robert Emery or Bob Emery may refer to:

== Arts and entertainment ==
- Bob Emery (broadcaster) (1897–1982), children's show host known as "Big Brother Bob Emery"
- Robert Emery (songwriter) (1794–1871), Tyneside songwriter
- Robert Emery (pianist) (born 1983), English pianist, conductor and orchestrator

== Sports ==
- Bob Emery (ice hockey) (born 1964), ice hockey coach
- Robert Emery (athlete) (1898–1934), American Olympic sprinter
- Robert W. Emery, American artistic gymnast

== Other ==
- Robert E. Emery (born 1952), American psychologist
- Robert M. Emery, soldier

== See also ==
- Robert Amery, Australian linguist
