= Sundblad =

Sundblad is a Swedish surname. Notable people with the surname include:

- Carl Sundblad (born 1849), Swedish peace activist
- Emily Sundblad (born 1977), American painter, singer and art dealer
- Eric Sundblad (1897–1983), Swedish sprinter
- Linda Sundblad (born 1981), Swedish singer, actress and model
- Niklas Sundblad (born 1973), Swedish ice hockey player
- Fran Sundblad, comic artist and creator of the comic Tiff & Eve
