= Sven Lundgren =

Swedish middle-distance runner (1896–1960)

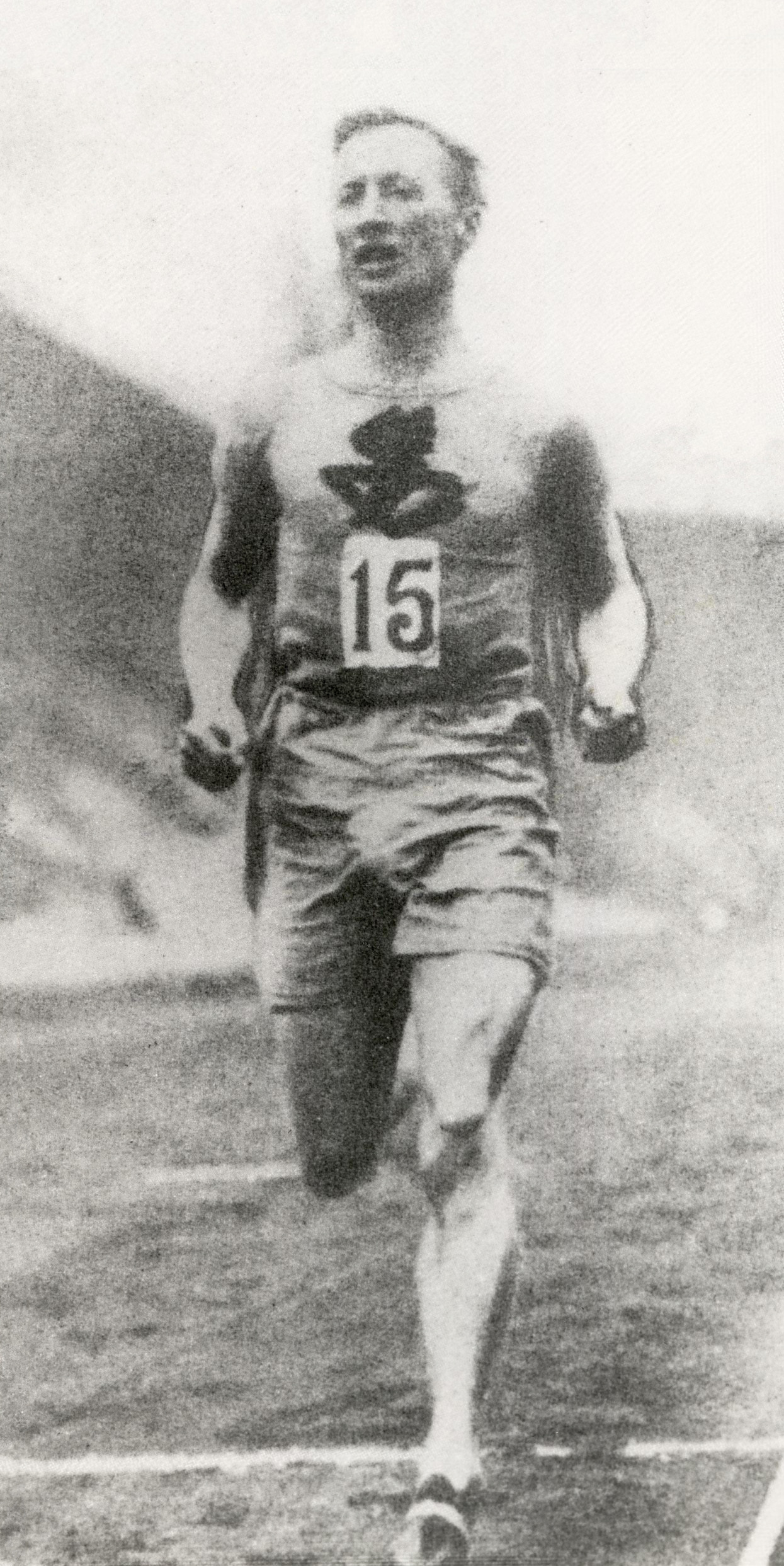

Personal information
- Born: 29 September 1896 Bromma, Stockholm, Sweden
- Died: 18 June 1960 (aged 63) Bromma, Stockholm, Sweden
- Height: 1.83 m (6 ft 0 in)
- Weight: 75 kg (165 lb)

Sport
- Sport: Athletics
- Event: 800–5000 m
- Club: IK Göta

Achievements and titles
- Personal best(s): 800 m – 1:54.3 (1921); 1500 m – 3:59.3 (1924); Mile – 4:22.8 (1919); 5000 m – 15:27.3 (1918)
Medal record
Representing Sweden
Olympic Games
Bronze medal – third place	1920 Antwerp	3000 m team

Sven Emil Lundgren (29 September 1896 – 18 June 1960) was a Swedish middle-distance runner who competed in the 800 m, 1500 and 3000 m events at the 1920 and 1924 Olympics.

== Career ==
Lundgren had his best results at the 1920 Olympic Games, when he won a bronze medal in the 3000 m team contest and finished fifth in the 1500 m. He failed to reach the finals in all other events.

Lundgren won eight Swedish titles, four over 800 m and four over 1500 m, six of them in 1919–1921. From 1922 to 1926, he held the world record in the 1000 m, and from 1919 to 1925 in the 4 × 1500 m relay. Lundgren finished second behind Albert Hill in the 1 mile event at the British 1919 AAA Championships and returned for the 1921 AAA Championships, where he finished third behind Edgar Mountain in the 880 yards event.

In retirement Lundgren worked as warehouse manager in Stockholm.
