= Oscar Zallhagen =

Swedish discus thrower (1893–1971)

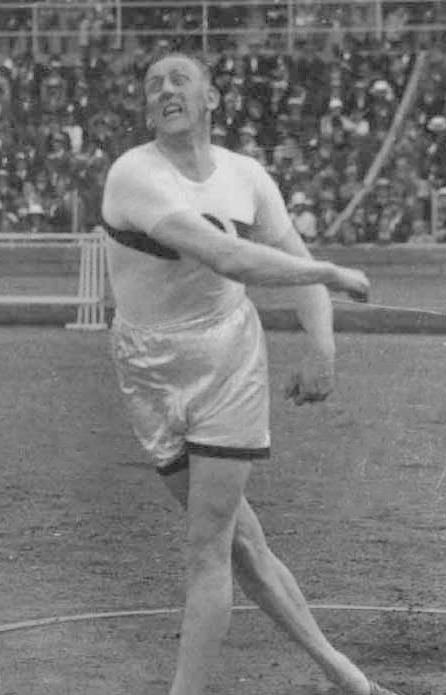

Personal information
- Born: 25 January 1893 Stockholm, Sweden
- Died: 20 August 1971 (aged 78) Bromma, Stockholm, Sweden
- Height: 194 cm (6 ft 4 in)
- Weight: 92 kg (203 lb)

Sport
- Sport: Athletics
- Events: Shot put, discus throw, triple jump
- Club: Kronobergs IK, Stockholm

Achievements and titles
- Personal bests: SP – 13.14 m (1916); DT – 45.77 m (1916); TJ – 13.14 m (1916)

Oscar Edvin Herbert Zallhagen (né Andersson; 25 January 1893 – 20 August 1971) was a Swedish track and field athlete.

== Career ==
Zallhagen competed in the discus throw at the 1920 Summer Olympics and placed fourth.

Zallhagen won the British AAA Championships title in the discus event at the 1921 AAA Championships and finished third behind Bertil Jansson in the shot put event at the same championships. He was the national champion of Sweden (1913–1922), finishing second in 1923. He was also a leading Swedish shot putter in 1914–1917.
