= Henry Dafel =

South African sprinter

Medal record

Men's athletics

Representing South Africa

Olympic Games
Silver medal – second place	1920 Antwerp	4x400 metre relay

Henning Johannes "Henry" Dafel (8 January 1889 in Pretoria – 21 August 1947) was a South African athlete who competed in the 1920 Summer Olympics.

He competed for South Africa in the 1920 Games held in Antwerp, Belgium in the 4x400 metre relay where he won the silver medal with his teammates Clarence Oldfield, Jack Oosterlaak and Bevil Rudd. They completed the race in a time of 3 minutes and 23 seconds flat. Dafel also finished sixth in the 400 metres event. In the 800 metres competition he was eliminated in the semi-finals and as member of the South African relay team he was eliminated in the first round of the 4x100 metre relay.
