= Cecil Griffiths =

British athlete (1900-1945)

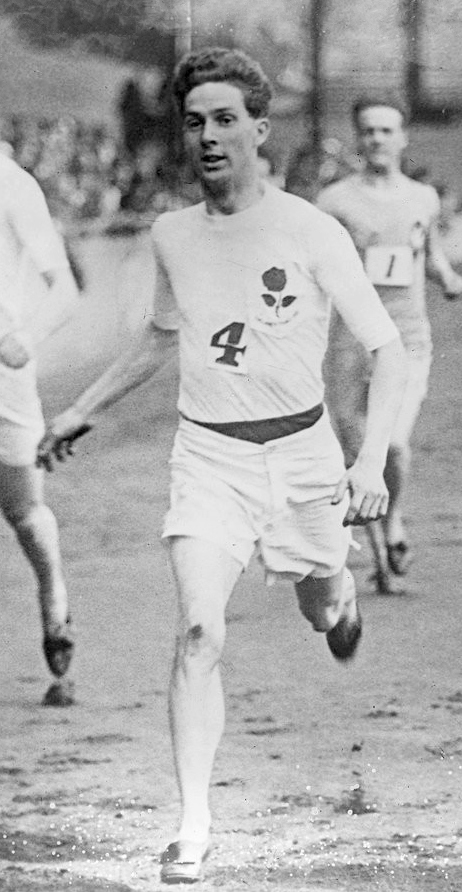
- Griffiths in 1922

Personal information
- Full name: Cecil Redvers Griffiths
- Born: 18 February 1900 Neath, Wales
- Died: 11 April 1945 (aged 45) Edgware, Greater London, England

Sport
- Sport: Track and field
- Events: 400 metres, 440 yards, 880 yards
- Club: Surrey AC

Achievements and titles
- Personal bests: 220 yd – 22.9 (1921); 440 yd – 49.8 (1921); 880 yd – 1:53.1e (1926); 1000 m – 2:31.8 (1925); Mile – 4:25.4 (1922)
Medal record
Representing Great Britain
Olympic Games
Gold medal – first place	1920 Antwerp	4 × 400 m relay

Cecil Redvers Griffiths (18 February 1900 – 11 April 1945) was a Welsh athlete who won a gold medal at the 1920 Summer Olympics. He was subsequently barred from competing at the 1924 Summer Olympics due to a ruling that he had competed as a professional during his early career, but continued to successfully race in domestic competitions.

== Biography ==
=== Early life ===
Griffiths' father, Benjamin, was a former able-bodied seaman born in a workhouse who settled in Neath upon leaving the Royal Navy. He was a successful local businessman, town councillor and committee member of Neath RFC. He married Sarah Trick in 1892.

Griffiths was Benjamin and Sarah's fifth child of six, but only older siblings Ben and Eva survived beyond infancy. Their father died when Griffiths was eight. Griffiths showed promise as a winger for Neath RFC but did not progress beyond the junior sides due to the outbreak of the First World War.

Upon leaving school, Griffiths began work at the Great Western Railway depot in Neath. When he reached his eighteenth birthday in February 1918, he volunteered for the Queen's Westminsters, a Territorial Army regiment in London. The war ended before Griffiths was sent on active service.

=== Athletics career ===
While in the army, Griffiths ran in several races, including winning the 440 yards at the 1918 Inter-Services Championships at Stamford Bridge. When the war ended, Griffiths joined Surrey Athletics Club and made his first appearance in the AAA Championships, finishing third in the 440 yards at the 1919 AAA Championships. Third place in the same race the following year at the 1920 AAA Championships, led to Griffiths being selected in the British team for the 1920 Summer Olympics.

Griffiths made his only Olympic Games appearance in the 1920 Antwerp Games, running the opening leg in the British 4 × 400 metres relay team which won the gold medal. He was also picked to represent Britain in the 400 metres but illness forced him to withdraw before the event.

In September 1920, soon after the Olympics, Griffiths was a member of the British Empire team that broke the 4 × 440 yards British record in a time of 3:20.8. The following year, Griffiths claimed the Welsh records in 220 yards and 440 yards.

Griffths claimed third behind Robert Lindsay in the 440 yards event at the 1921 AAA Championships before switching focus to 880 yards. In his first season, he broke the Welsh record at this distance and finished runner-up to Edgar Mountain at the 1922 AAA Championships. He won the AAA Championships 880 yards in 1923 and 1925.

At the end of 1923 or in early 1924, Griffiths was banned by the International Amateur Athletics Federation and Amateur Athletic Association for receiving prize money at unregistered races in Neath and Swansea in 1917, the cumulative prizes of which totalled less than £10. As a reinstated professional, Griffiths was allowed to compete in domestic competitions but was prevented from representing the UK in international competitions. This barred him from the 1924 Summer Olympics in Paris, where it is likely that Griffiths would have competed in the 800 metres and 4 × 400 metres relay.

=== Life after athletics ===
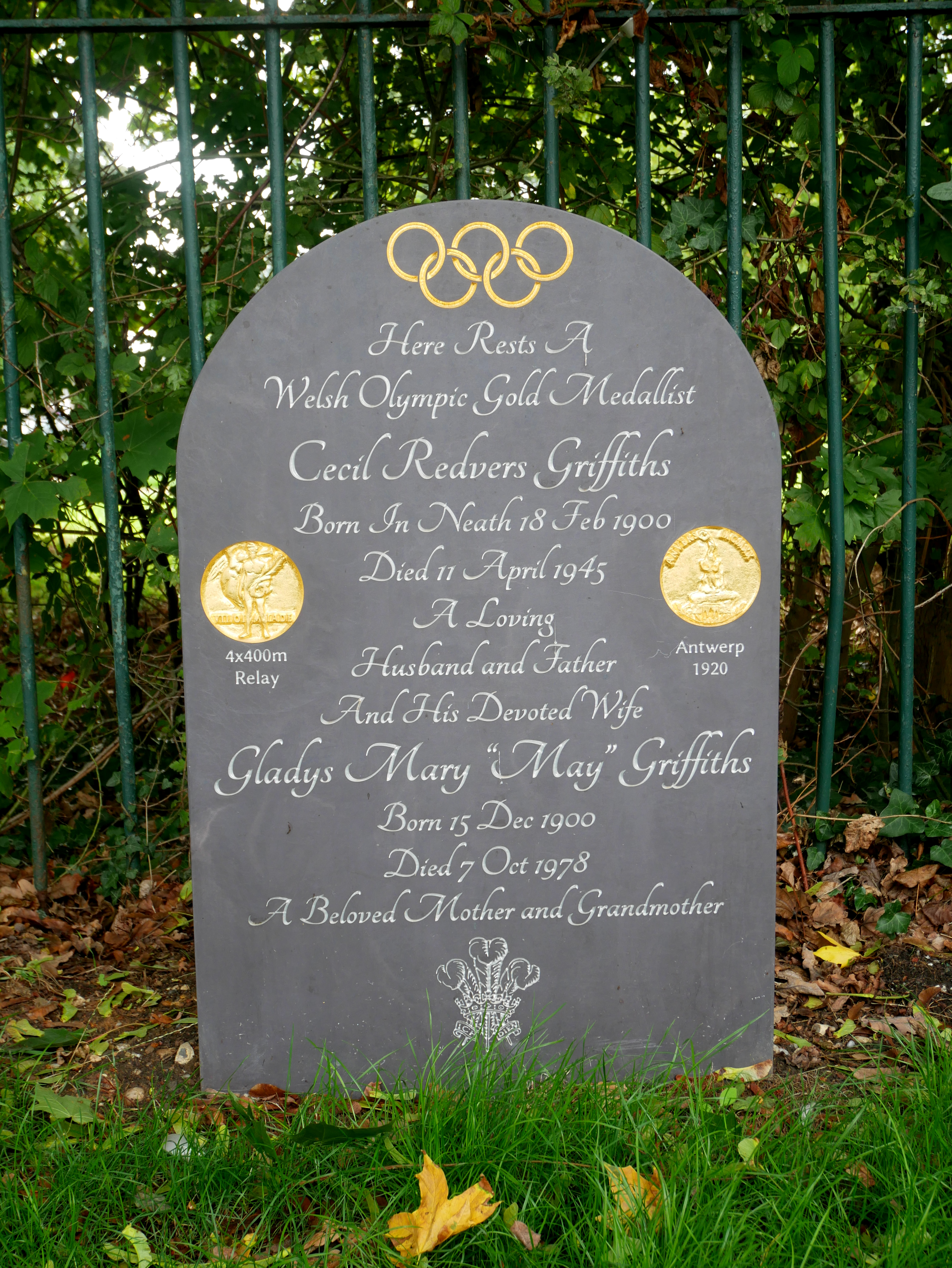
Griffiths' headstone in the churchyard at Little Stanmore

Griffiths retired from competitive running in 1929. He lost his job in the Great Depression that followed the Wall Street crash and was forced to sell most of his trophies and medals. Griffiths found employment again at the coal depot office of the London Co-operative Society in Edgware. On the outbreak of the Second World War, Griffiths joined his local Home Guard and reportedly saved the life of a comrade who dropped a live grenade by throwing it over a blast wall.

Griffiths died of heart failure in 1945 at Edgware railway station in London, leaving a widow and two sons. He was buried in St. Lawrence's Church in London in an unmarked grave. In 2022, a headstone was installed at the grave.

== Personal life ==
Griffiths met his wife, Gladys (May) Rees, at a junior running race in Neath in 1915. They were later formally introduced by May's older brother. They married in St. David's Parish Church in Neath on 25 July 1922, but spent all of their married life in London. Griffiths had two sons, John and Cecil (usually called Rees).

One of Griffiths' uncles, George Trick, was a captain of Neath RFC. A cousin, Kathleen Trick, is thought to be the first identifiable female depicted in rugby kit.
