= Clarence Oldfield =

South African sprinter

Olympic medal record

Men's athletics

Representing South Africa
Silver medal – second place	1920 Antwerp	4x400 metre relay

Clarence Winston Oldfield (27 November 1899 in Durban – 14 December 1981) was a South African athlete who competed mainly in the 400 metres. He competed for South Africa in the 1920 Summer Olympics held in Antwerp, Belgium in the 4 x 400 metre relay where he won the silver medal with his teammates Harry Davel, Jack Oosterlaak and Bevil Rudd.
