= Odolf Larsen =

Norwegian middle-distance runner

Personal information
- Nationality: Norwegian
- Born: 23 November 1897
- Died: 2 July 1973 (aged 75)

Sport
- Sport: Middle-distance running
- Event: 800 metres

Odolf Larsen (23 November 1897 – 2 July 1973) was a Norwegian middle-distance runner. He competed in the men's 800 metres at the 1920 Summer Olympics.
