= Robin Rudd =

South African cricketer

Personal information
- Full name: Clifford Robin David Rudd
- Born: 25 March 1929; Cape Town, Cape Province, South Africa
- Died: 30 August 1996 (aged 67); Bulawayo, Matabeleland, Zimbabwe
- Batting: Right-handed
- Relatives: Philip Rudd (son)

Domestic team information
- Years: Team
- 1950–1960: Marylebone Cricket Club
- 1949–1951: Oxford University
- 1946: Buckinghamshire

Career statistics
Competition	First-class
Matches	21
Runs scored	604
Batting average	16.77
100s/50s	–/3
Top score	70
Balls bowled	–
Wickets	–
Bowling average	–
5 wickets in innings	–
10 wickets in match	–
Best bowling	–
Catches/stumpings	11/–
- Source: Cricinfo, 14 May 2011

Clifford Robin David Rudd (25 March 1929 – 30 August 1996) was a South African cricketer. Rudd was a right-handed batsman.

He was a son of Bevil Gordon d'Urban Rudd, an Olympic sprinter, and Ursula Mary Knight, daughter of Clifford Hume Knight, the Italian Consul to Cape Town. Robin was born in Cape Town, Cape Province and later educated at Eton College in England, where he captained the college cricket team in 1946.

Rudd made his debut in county cricket for Buckinghamshire in the 1946 Minor Counties Championship, making a single appearance against Berkshire. He made his first-class debut for Oxford University against Gloucestershire in 1949. He played 16 first-class matches for Oxford University, the last coming against Middlesex in 1951. In those 16 first-class matches, he scored 452 runs at a batting average of 16.74, with a 2 half centuries and a high score of 66.

He also played first-class cricket for the Marylebone Cricket Club, making 3 appearances for the team. These came against Ireland on the clubs tour of Ireland in 1951, Canada on the MCC 1951 tour of Canada, and lastly against Ireland on the MCC 1960 tour of Ireland. He scored 101 runs at an average of 20.20, with a single half century score of 70. In addition, he played 2 first-class matches for the Free Foresters in 1952.

Following the end of his cricket career, he worked for the Anglo American Corporation. He died in Bulawayo, Zimbabwe on 30 August 1996. He was survived by his son, Philip, who played first-class cricket for Griqualand West.
