= Hedges Worthington-Eyre =

British sprinter

Personal information
- Nationality: British
- Born: 8 September 1899 Dún Laoghaire, Ireland
- Died: 20 October 1979 (aged 80) London, England

Sport
- Sport: Sprinting
- Event: 400 metres

Hedges Worthington-Eyre (8 September 1899 – 20 October 1979) was a British sprinter. He competed in the men's 400 metres at the 1920 Summer Olympics.
