= John Ainsworth-Davis =

Welsh athlete and surgeon (1895-1976)

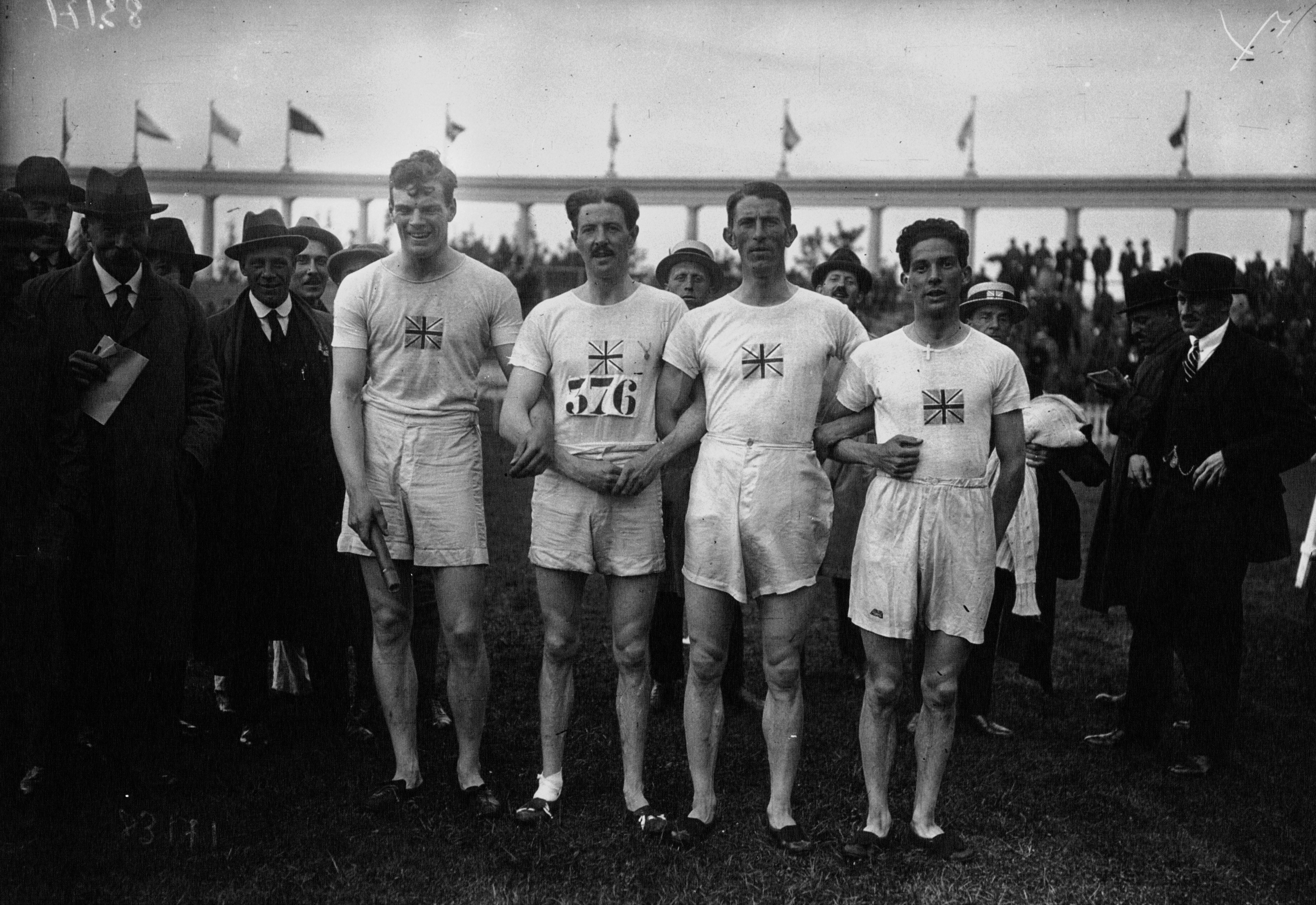
- British relay team at the 1920 Olympics, Ainsworth-Davis is 2nd left

Personal information
- Born: 23 April 1895 Aberystwyth, Wales
- Died: 3 January 1976 (aged 80) Stockland, Devon, England
- Education: University of Cambridge

Sport
- Sport: Athletics
- Event: 400 m
- Club: University of Cambridge AC; Achilles Club

Achievements and titles
- Personal best: 400 m – 50.0e (1920)
Medal record
Representing Great Britain
Olympic Games
Gold medal – first place	1920 Antwerp	4 × 400 m relay

John Creyghton Ainsworth-Davis (23 April 1895 – 3 January 1976) was a Welsh surgeon and sprint runner who won a gold medal in the 4 × 400 m relay at the 1920 Summer Olympics.

== Biography ==
John Ainsworth-Davis studied at Westminster School. During World War I he first served as a captain with the Rifle Brigade and then as pilot in the Royal Flying Corps.

At the 1920 Summer Olympics Ainsworth-Davis ran the third leg for the British 4 × 400 m relay team, which won the event. He also competed in the individual 400 m, to replace Cecil Griffiths who fell ill, and finished fifth.

After graduating from University of Cambridge Ainsworth-Davis studied medicine at St. Bartholomew's Hospital and played music at a nightclub to support his family. He could not make time for sport, and retired from competitions after placing fourth in the 440 yards at the 1921 AAA Championships. He became a respected urological surgeon and the Secretary of the Royal Society of Medicine (RSM). During World War II he was head of the surgical division of RAF Hospital Cosford. Later he served as Secretary and President of the Hunterian Society (1958) and Secretary of the RSM.

Ainsworth-Davis married Marguerite C. Wharry in 1920, with whom he had three children: Mary (1923), John Christopher (1924) (an actor/director/author who wrote under the pen name of Christopher Creighton and used the name John Ainsworth in the theatrical world), and Jennifer (1930).

== See also ==
- List of honorary medical staff at King Edward VII's Hospital for Officers
