= Joseph Vander Wee =

Belgian middle-distance runner

Personal information
- Nationality: Belgian
- Born: 14 December 1902 Brussels
- Died: 11 October 1978 (aged 75)

Sport
- Sport: Middle-distance running
- Event: 800 metres

Joseph Vander Wee (14 December 1902 – 11 October 1978) was a Belgian middle-distance runner. He competed in the men's 800 metres at the 1920 Summer Olympics.
