= Géo André =

French high jumper, hurdler and rugby union player

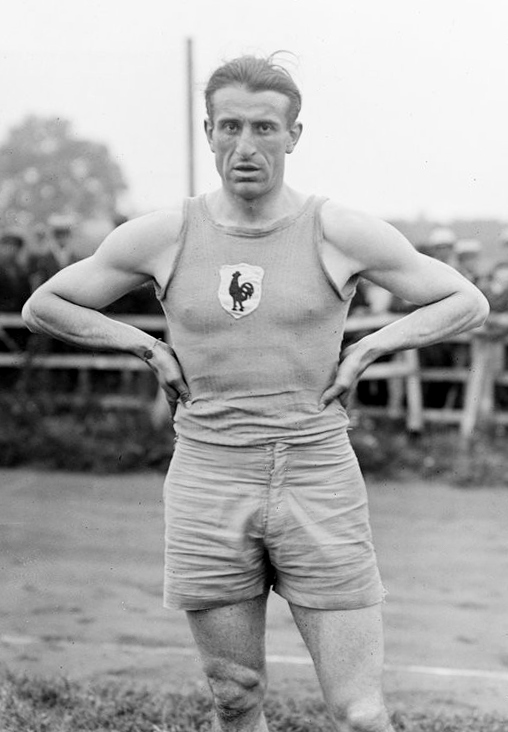
- Géo André in 1920

Personal information
- Full name: Georges Yvan André
- Born: 13 August 1889 Paris, France
- Died: 4 May 1943 (aged 53) Mateur, Bizerte, French Tunisia
- Height: 188 cm (6 ft 2 in)
- Weight: 85 kg (187 lb)

Sport
- Sport: Athletics
- Events: Sprint, hurdles, high jump, decathlon
- Club: Stade français, Paris (−1908); Racing Club de France, Paris (1909–)

Achievements and titles
- Personal bests: 100 m – 11.0 (1914); 200 m – 22.6 (1919); 400 m – 49.0 (1914); 110 mH – 15.4 (1922); 400 mH – 54.8e (1920); HJ – 1.88 m (1908)
Medal record
Representing France
Olympic Games
Silver medal – second place	1908 London	High jump
Bronze medal – third place	1920 Antwerp	4×400 m relay

Georges Yvan "Géo" André (13 August 1889 – 4 May 1943) was a French track and field athlete and rugby union player.

== Biography ==
As an athlete, he competed in the 1908, 1912, 1920 and 1924 Summer Olympics in various events, including long jump, high jump, 400 m sprint, 110 and 400 m hurdles, pentathlon and decathlon. He won a silver medal in the high jump in 1908 and a bronze in the 4 × 400 m relay in 1920, finishing fourth in the 400 m hurdles in 1920 and 1924 and fifth in the standing high jump in 1908. At the 1924 Olympics, he took the Olympic Oath and served as the flag bearer for the French delegation.

André won French titles in 110 m hurdles (1908, 1914, 1919, 1922), 400 m hurdles (1913–14, 1919–20, 1922), high jump (1907–1909, 1911, 1914, 1919), standing high jump (1909, 1911–12, 1914, 1919–20). He held national records in the 110 m hurdles (1908 – 15.8; 1922 – 15.4), 400 m hurdles (1913 – 57.0; 1920 – 57.0/56.0/55.6), high jump (1907 – 1.79; 1908 – 1.80/1.885), and 4 × 400 m relay (1922 – 3:24.0). André finished second behind Carl-Axel Christiernsson in the 440 yards hurdles event at the British 1921 AAA Championships.

In 1913–1914 he played for the national rugby team.

André was wounded while serving as a fighter pilot in World War I. After retiring from competitions, he worked as a sports journalist for several prominent French newspapers. During World War II he joined the infantry and was killed by German forces in 1943 in Tunis, aged 53. His son Jacques (1919–1988) competed as a hurdler in the 1948 Olympics.
