= Tom Campbell (athlete) =

American middle-distance runner

Personal information
- Born: July 20, 1898 St. Stephen, South Carolina, United States
- Died: May 30, 1971 (aged 72)

Sport
- Sport: Middle-distance running
- Event: 800 metres

Tom Campbell (July 20, 1898 – May 30, 1971) was an American middle-distance runner. He competed in the men's 800 metres at the 1920 Summer Olympics.
