= Carl-Axel Christiernsson =

Swedish hurdler

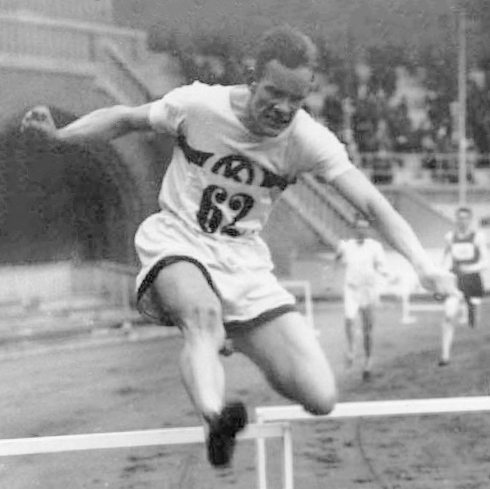

Personal information
- Born: 7 January 1898 Stockholm, Sweden
- Died: 27 October 1969 (aged 71) Stockholm, Sweden
- Height: 1.82 m (6 ft 0 in)
- Weight: 71 kg (157 lb)

Sport
- Sport: Athletics
- Events: 110, 400 m hurdles, sprint, triple jump, decathlon
- Club: Kronobergs IK, Stockholm

Achievements and titles
- Personal bests: 110 mH – 14.9 (1926); 400 mH – 54.9 (1922); 200 m – 22.3 (1921); TJ – 13.60 m (1918); Dec – 7072 (1919)

Carl-Axel "Cacka" Christiernsson (7 January 1898 – 27 October 1969) was a Swedish hurdler who competed at the 1920 and 1924 Summer Olympics.

== Career ==
At the Olympic Games in 1920, he finished fifth in the 400 m and sixth in the 110 m event. Four years later he placed fourth in the 110 m final at the 1924 Olympic Games.

Nationally, Christiernsson won the Swedish hurdles titles over 110 metres in 1920–22 and over 400 metres in 1920–22 and 1924. He also won the English AAA title in the 440 yards hurdles at the 1921 AAA Championships and finished second behind Henri Bernard in the 120 yards hurdles event at the same championships.

From 1922 to 1926, he occasionally competed in the United States and set American indoor hurdles records over 60, 80, and 100 yards.
