= André Devaux =

French sprinter (1894–1981)

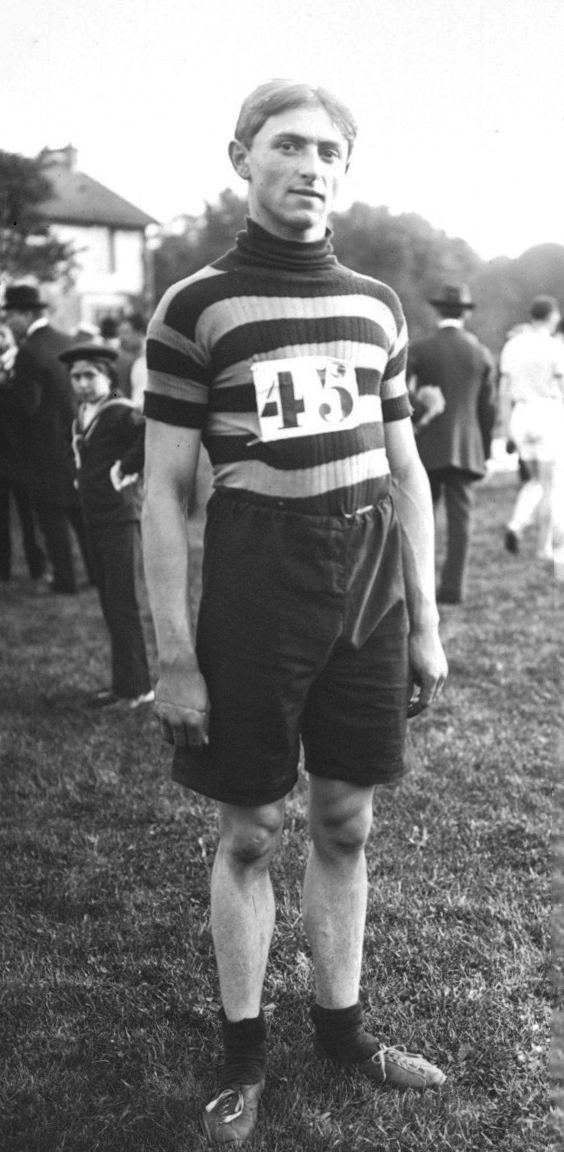
- Devaux in 1913

Personal information
- Born: 4 August 1894 Laon, France
- Died: 28 February 1981 (aged 86) Chaumont, France

Sport
- Sport: Athletics
- Event: 400 m
- Club: Racing Club de France, Paris
Medal record
Representing France
Olympic Games
Bronze medal – third place	1920 Antwerp	4×400 m relay

Jean André Devaux (4 August 1894 – 28 February 1981) was a French sprinter. In 1914, he won the national 400 m title, and in 1920, he was part of the French 4 × 400 m relay that won an Olympic bronze medal. He missed the 1924 Games due to an injury.

Devaux was an inspector of postal services and telecommunications and an accomplished writer, the author of the 1954 book La Gerbe et le Fagot.
