= Teplý =

Teplý (pronounced [ˈtɛpliː]; feminine form Teplá [ˈtɛplaː]) is a Czech surname. It is derived from the Czech–Slovak word teplý for "warm."

People with the surname include:

- Jiří Teplý (born 1962), Czech cross country skier
- Josef Teplý (1902–unknown), Czech middle-distance runner
- Michal Teplý (born 2001), Czech ice hockey player
- Oldřich Teplý (born 1940), Czech speed skater
- Viktor Teplý (born 1990), Czech sailor
