= Léoncé Oleffe =

Belgian middle-distance runner

Léoncé Eugene Ernest Oleffe
Personal information
- Nationality: Belgian
- Born: 25 August 1897 Mont-Saint-Guibert, Belgium
- Died: 19 November 1972 (aged 75) Woluwé-Saint-Pierre, Belgium

Sport
- Sport: Middle-distance running
- Event: 800 metres

Léoncé Oleffe (25 August 1897 – 19 November 1972) was a Belgian middle-distance runner. He competed in the men's 800 metres at the 1920 Summer Olympics.
