= Fernand Bauduin =

French middle-distance runner

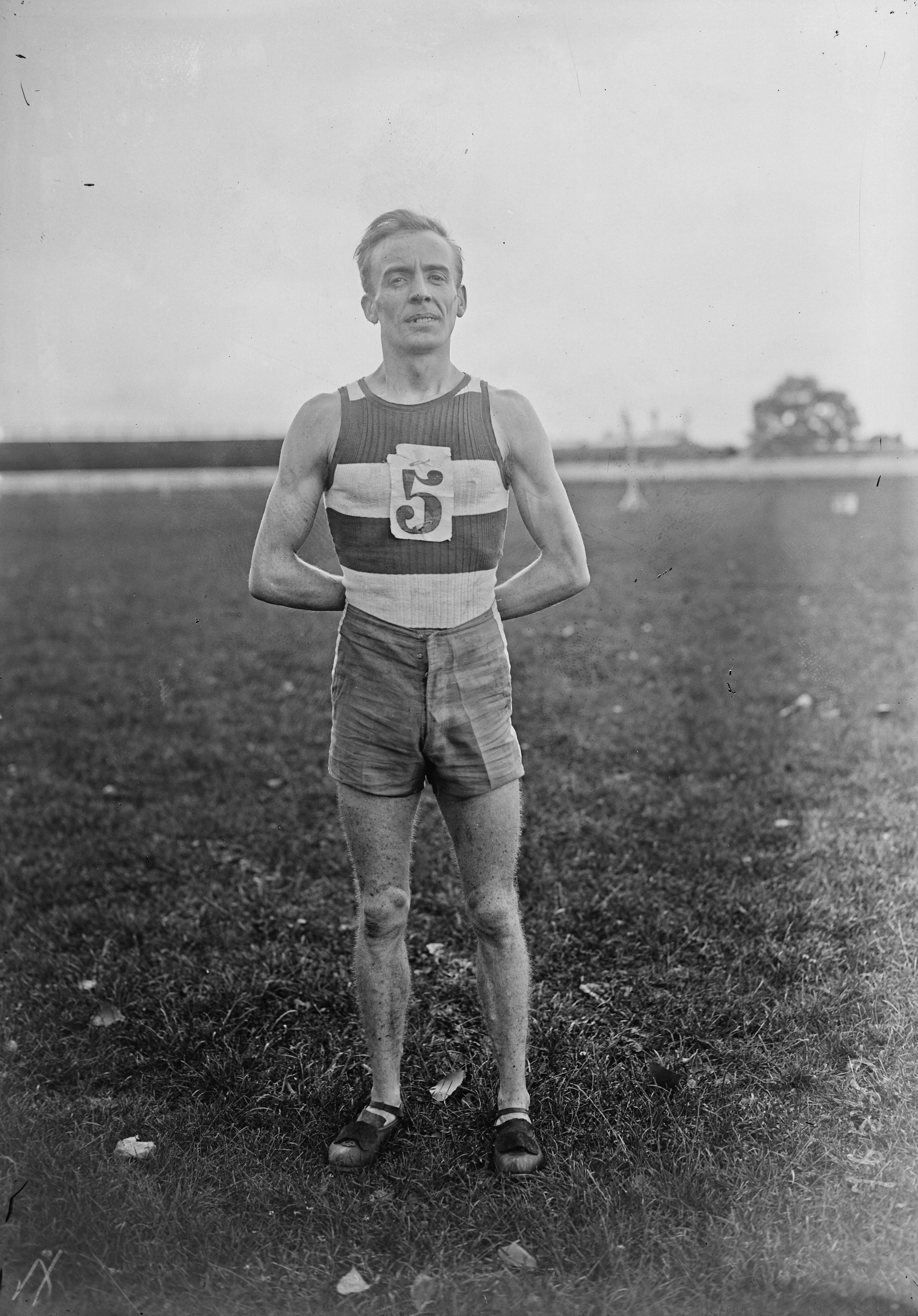

Personal information
- Nationality: French
- Born: 30 September 1894
- Died: 31 July 1951 (aged 56)

Sport
- Sport: Middle-distance running
- Event: 800 metres

Fernand Bauduin (30 September 1894 – 31 July 1951) was a French middle-distance runner. He competed in the men's 800 metres at the 1920 Summer Olympics.
