= James Doig =

South African middle-distance runner

Personal information
- Nationality: South African
- Born: 1894
- Died: 1967 (aged 72–73)

Sport
- Sport: Middle-distance running
- Event: 800 metres

James Doig (1894 – 1967) was a South African middle-distance runner. He competed in the men's 800 metres at the 1920 Summer Olympics.
