= George Bretnall =

American sprinter

Personal information
- Nationality: American
- Born: September 11, 1895 Blairstown, Iowa
- Died: March 20, 1974 (aged 78) Ames, Iowa
- Height: 180 cm (5 ft 11 in)
- Weight: 62 kg (137 lb)

Sport
- Sport: Sprinting
- Event: 4 × 400 metres relay

George Bretnall (September 11, 1895 – March 20, 1974) was an American sprinter. He competed in the men's 4 × 400 metres relay at the 1920 Summer Olympics.
