= Albert Sprott =

American athlete

Personal information
- Full name: Albert Bryan Sprott
- Born: August 7, 1897 San Diego, California, United States
- Died: December 19, 1951 (aged 64)

Sport
- Sport: Middle-distance running
- Event: 800 metres

Albert Bryan Sprott (August 7, 1897 – December 19, 1951) was an American middle-distance runner. He competed in the men's 800 metres at the 1920 Summer Olympics.

== Sporting career ==
At the 1920 AAU/Olympic Trials meet, Bryan Sprott qualified for the Olympic Team when he placed fourth. On the 800, his personal best was 1:56.4; he competed in the 1920 Antwerp, Belgium Olympics. He also played for the University of California at Berkeley (UC Berkeley or Cal) and the Los Angeles Athletic Club. Sprott was a runningback for the UC Berkeley football team, and he also came to be known as the star halfback of the 1920 Cal "Wonder Team".

== Later life ==
Sprott began working for the Fibreboard Products Factory in Antioch, California. He loved collecting railroad car numbers when they traveled through the town as a hobby. One day while on his lunch break, he was walking along the tracks to collect more numbers when a train unfortunately hit and killed him.
