= Kléber Argouac'h =

French middle-distance runner

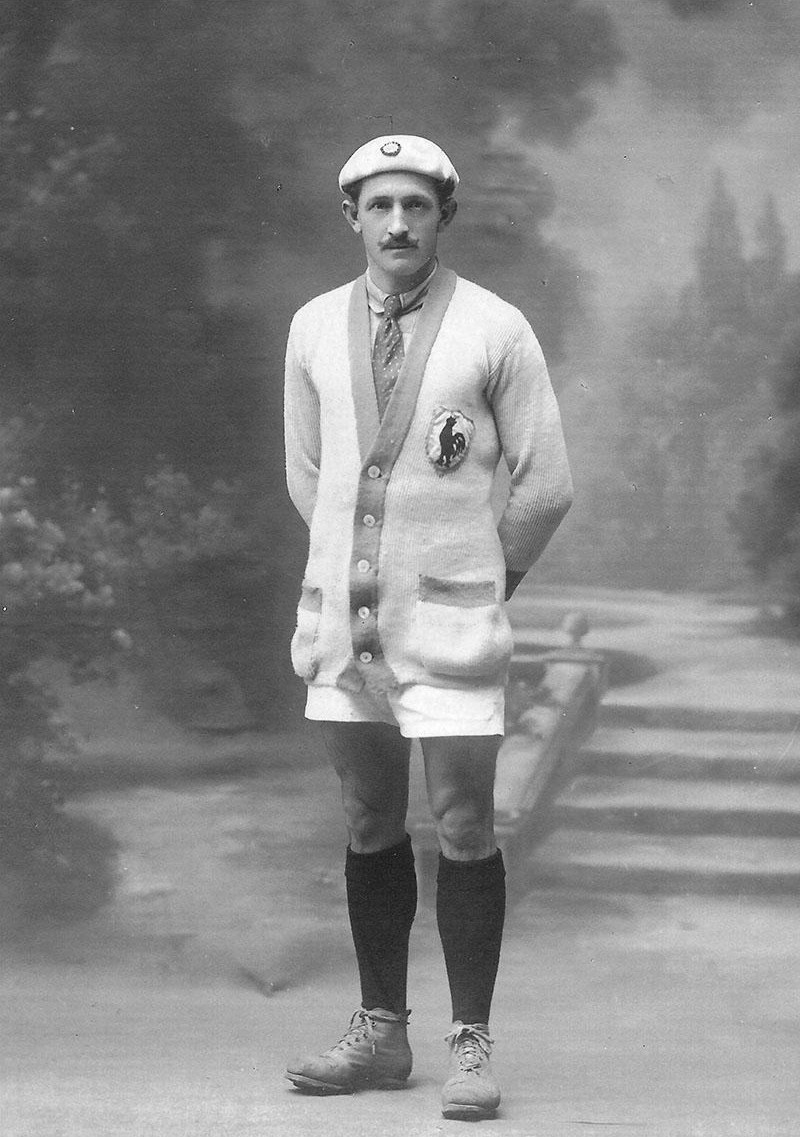
- Argouac'h in 1920

Personal information
- Nationality: French
- Born: 14 January 1896
- Died: 5 July 1946 (aged 50)

Sport
- Sport: Middle-distance running
- Event: 800 metres

Kléber Argouac'h (14 January 1896 – 5 July 1946) was a French middle-distance runner. He competed in the men's 800 metres at the 1920 Summer Olympics.
