= Eugène Bayon =

French sprinter

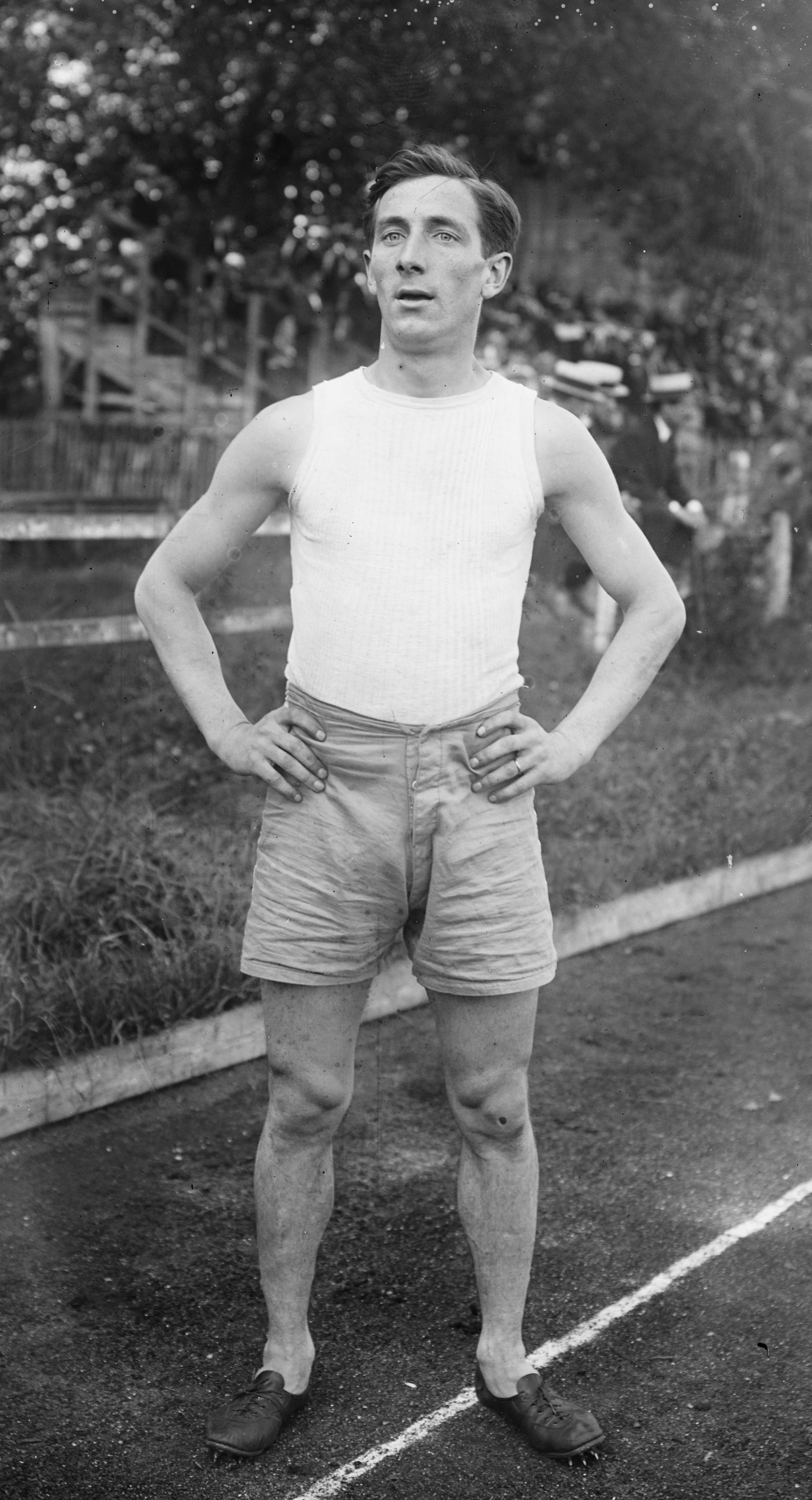
- Eugène Bayon in 1920

Personal information
- Born: 27 November 1899
- Died: 3 April 1941 (aged 41)

Sport
- Sport: Athletics
- Event: 400 m
- Club: ASU Lyon

Eugène Bayon (27 November 1899 – 3 April 1941) was a French sprinter. He competed in the 400 m event at the 1920 Summer Olympics, but failed to reach the final.
