= Robert Goullieux =

French middle-distance runner

Personal information
- Nationality: French
- Born: 5 March 1900
- Died: 6 October 1951 (aged 51)

Sport
- Sport: Middle-distance running
- Event: 800 metres

Robert Goullieux (5 March 1900 – 6 October 1951) was a French middle-distance runner. He competed in the men's 800 metres at the 1920 Summer Olympics.
