= Henri Godding =

Belgian middle-distance runner

Personal information
- Nationality: Belgian
- Born: 28 May 1892 Brussels
- Died: 16 October 1980 (aged 88)

Sport
- Sport: Middle-distance running
- Event: 800 metres

Henri Godding (28 May 1892 – 16 October 1980) was a Belgian middle-distance runner. He competed in the men's 800 metres at the 1920 Summer Olympics.
