= Giovanni Tosi =

Italian sprinter

Personal information
- Nationality: Italian
- Born: 14 May 1899
- Died: 1 October 1985 (aged 86)

Sport
- Sport: Sprinting
- Event: 400 metres

Giovanni Tosi (14 May 1899 – 1 October 1985) was an Italian sprinter. He competed in the men's 400 metres at the 1920 Summer Olympics.
