= Jean Delarge (athlete) =

Belgian middle-distance runner

Personal information
- Nationality: Belgian
- Born: Jean Marie Gérard Delarge; 27 January 1893 Ixelles, Belgium
- Died: 24 June 1992 (aged 99) Uccle, Belgium

Sport
- Sport: Middle-distance running
- Event: 800 metres

Jean Marie Gérard Delarge (27 January 1893 – 24 June 1992) was a Belgian middle-distance runner. He competed in the men's 800 metres at the 1920 Summer Olympics.
