= Paul Esparbès =

French middle-distance runner

Personal information
- Nationality: French
- Born: 19 April 1896
- Died: 27 April 1934 (aged 38)

Sport
- Sport: Middle-distance running
- Event: 800 metres

Jean-Paul Esparbès (19 April 1896 – 27 April 1934) was a French middle-distance runner. He competed in the men's 800 metres at the 1920 Summer Olympics.
