= Einar Mangset =

Norwegian sprinter (1893–1992)

Personal information
- Nationality: Norwegian
- Born: 15 November 1893
- Died: 6 January 1992 (aged 98)

Sport
- Sport: Sprinting
- Event: 400 metres

Einar Mangset (15 November 1893 – 6 January 1992) was a Norwegian sprinter. He competed in the men's 400 metres at the 1920 Summer Olympics.
