= Hec Phillips =

Canadian athlete

Hector "Hec" Phillips (May 26, 1889 (in Edinburgh, Great Britain) – October 7, 1948) was a Canadian athlete who competed in the 1920 and 1924 Summer Olympics. Phillips was Canada's flag bearer at the 1924 Olympics in Paris.

Phillips competed in both the 400 metres and 800 metres at the 1920 Olympics. In the 400 metres, he finished fifth in his heat and failed to advance. In the 800 metres, he finished eighth in his quarterfinal heat and did not advance. He also competed in the 800 metres in the 1924 Olympics, finishing fifth in his heat and failing to advance.

From 1933 to his death in 1948, Phillips was the coach of the University of Toronto Varsity Blues men's track and field team. In 1950, a group of his former athletes donated the Hec Phillips Memorial Trophy, which is presented annually to an outstanding athlete at the Ontario University Athletics's outdoor meet. Phillips was to be the coach of the Canadian athletics team at the 1948 Summer Olympics, but a sudden illness prevented him. He died later that year and was buried in the Mount Pleasant Cemetery in Toronto.

In 1997, Phillips was inducted into the University of Toronto Varsity Blues Hall of Fame as a builder.

== Personal life ==
Phillips served with the 3rd Battalion (Toronto Regiment), Canadian Expeditionary Force in the First World War as a gunner. At his enlistment on March 25, 1915, in Toronto, he listed his occupation as a bank clerk, and was unmarried with no children.
