= José Luis Grasset =

Spanish middle-distance runner

Personal information
- Nationality: Spanish
- Born: 28 May 1901
- Died: 19 October 1974 (aged 73)

Sport
- Sport: Middle-distance running
- Event: 800 metres

José Luis Grasset (28 May 1901 – 19 October 1974) was a Spanish middle-distance runner. He competed in the men's 800 metres at the 1920 Summer Olympics.
