= Karel Frankenstein =

Czech sprinter

Personal information
- Nationality: Czech
- Born: 19 April 1897 Jičín, Bohemia, Austria-Hungary
- Died: 11 February 1954 (aged 56) Lausanne, Switzerland

Sport
- Sport: Sprinting, middle-distance running
- Events: 400 metres, 800 metres

Karel Frankenstein (19 April 1897 – 11 February 1954) was a Czech sprinter and middle-distance runner. Domestically, he represented Sparta Prague. He then competed as an athlete for Czechoslovakia at the 1920 Summer Olympics.

At the games, he competed in the men's 400 metres and men's 800 metres, though did not advance further from the heats. After the games, he became the national champion in the men's 800 metres and 4 × 400 metres relay.

== Biography ==
Karel Frankenstein was born on 19 April 1897 in Jičín, Bohemia, Austria-Hungary. Domestically, Frankenstein represented Sparta Prague in athletics competitions.

Czechoslovakia first competed at the 1920 Summer Olympics in Antwerp, Belgium. At these games, Frankenstein first competed in the heats of the men's 800 metres on 15 August. In his round, he placed sixth out of the eight competitors in the round and did not advance further. He then competed in the heats of the men's 400 metres on 19 August. He ran in an estimated time of 52.5 seconds and placed third in his heat of five competitors, again not advancing.

In the same year of the 1920 Summer Games, he set personal bests in the 400 metres and 800 metres with times of 51.2 seconds and 2 minutes flat. A year after the games, he became the Czechoslovak national champion in the 800 metres and 4 × 400 metres relay as part of Sparta Praha.

Frankenstein died on 11 February 1954 in Lausanne, Switzerland.
