= 1921 AAA Championships =

Outdoor track and field competition

- Dates: 1–2 July 1921
- Host city: London, England
- Venue: Stamford Bridge
- Level: Senior
- Type: Outdoor
- Events: 21

The 1921 AAA Championships was the 1921 edition of the annual outdoor track and field competition organised by the Amateur Athletic Association (AAA). It was held from 1–2 July 1921 at Stamford Bridge in London, England. The attendance was between 15,000 and 20,000 and the championships received a record entry of athletes.

The Championships consisted of 21 events and covered two days of competition.

== Results ==
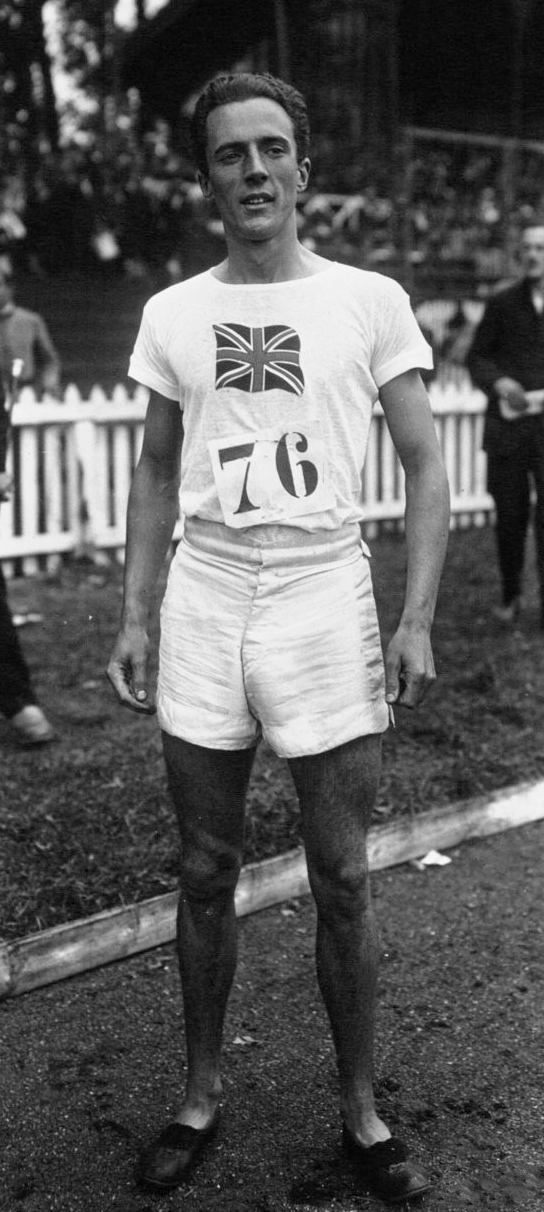
Edgar Mountain the 880 yards champion

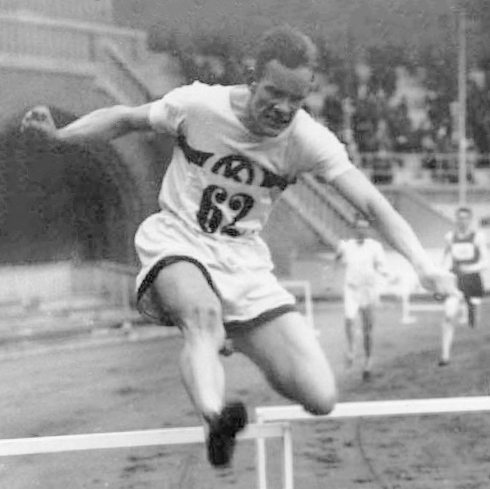
Carl-Axel Christiernsson was one of seven Swedes who won an AAA title

Event	Gold		Silver		Bronze	
100 yards	Harry Edward	10.2	Harold Abrahams	½ yd	William Hill	1 ft
220 yards	Harry Edward	22.2	Harold Abrahams	1½ yd	(France) Henri Nozières	1 ft
440 yards	Robert Lindsay	50.4	(South Africa) Bevil Rudd	50.4	(Wales) Cecil Griffiths	51.4
880 yards	Edgar Mountain	1:56.8	(South Africa) Bevil Rudd	4-6 yd	(Sweden) Sven Lundgren	8-9 yd
1 mile	Albert Hill	4:13.8 NR	Henry Stallard	4:14.2	(France) Lucien Duquesne	20-80 yd
4 miles	Walter Monk	19:59.2	James Hatton	20:03.8	(Sweden) Eric Backman	20 yd
10 miles	Halland Britton	54:58.2	Joe Blewitt	55:38.2	William Cotterell	56:12.2
steeplechase	Percy Hodge	10:57.2	Evelyn Montague	7 yd	Bert Rippington	180 yd
120y hurdles	(France) Henri Bernard	15.8	(Sweden) Carl-Axel Christiernsson	inches	Frederick Nicholas	½ yd
440y hurdles	(Sweden) Carl-Axel Christiernsson	55.4	(France) Géo André	58.0	(Australia) Wilfrid Kent Hughes	58.2
2 miles walk	John Evans	14:40.2	Charles Gunn	14:49.2	Fred Poynton	14:51.0
7 miles walk	Harold Ross	55:48.6	William Hehir	56:21.6	Reg Goodwin	56:21.8
high jump	Benjamin Howard Baker	1.897	(France) Pierre Guilloux	1.848	(Sweden) Bertil Jansson	1.803
pole jump	(Sweden) Ernfrid Rydberg	3.71	(France) André Francquenelle	3.40	Wilholm Wihuri	2.74
long jump	(United States) H.C. Taylor	6.73	(Sweden) William Petersson	6.69	Leonard Ingrams	6.59
triple jump	(Sweden) Folke Jansson	14.19	Benjamin Howard Baker	13.31	John Odde	12.27
shot put	(Sweden) Bertil Jansson	14.08	(France) Raoul Paoli	12.89	(Sweden) Oscar Zallhagen	12.41
discus throw	(Sweden) Oscar Zallhagen	41.00	(Sweden) Carl Johan Lind	35.83	(France) Raoul Paoli	35.55
hammer throw	(Sweden) Carl Johan Lind	49.36	Malcolm Nokes	47.52	(Scotland) John Jackson	35.27
javelin throw	(Sweden) Gunnar Lindström	62.48	(Sweden) Folke Jansson	50.71	(Sweden) Bertil Jansson	47.40
1 mile relay	Polytechnic Harriers		Surrey AC	6 yd	Queen's Park Harriers	30 yd
