= Jaroslav Procházka =

Czech middle-distance runner

Personal information
- Nationality: Czech
- Born: 21 April 1895
- Died: 1 September 1925 (aged 30)

Sport
- Sport: Middle-distance running
- Event: 800 metres

Jaroslav Procházka (21 April 1895 – 1 September 1925) was a Czech middle-distance runner. He competed in the men's 800 metres at the 1920 Summer Olympics.
