= Miguel García (runner) =

Spanish sprinter

Personal information
- Nationality: Spanish
- Born: Miguel García Onsalo; 20 June 1897
- Died: 30 October 1994 (aged 97)

Sport
- Sport: Sprinting
- Event: 400 metres

Miguel García Onsalo (20 June 1897 – 30 October 1994) was a Spanish sprinter. He competed in the men's 400 metres at the 1920 Summer Olympics.
