= Mario-Giuseppe Bonini =

Italian middle-distance runner

Personal information
- Nationality: Italian
- Born: 19 August 1897 Golasecca
- Died: unknown Rome

Sport
- Country: Italy
- Sport: Athletics
- Event: Middle-distance running

Mario-Giuseppe Bonini (19 August 1897 – date of death unknown) was an Italian middle-distance runner who competed at the 1920 Summer Olympics and 1924 Summer Olympics.
