= Edgar Mountain =

British middle-distance runner

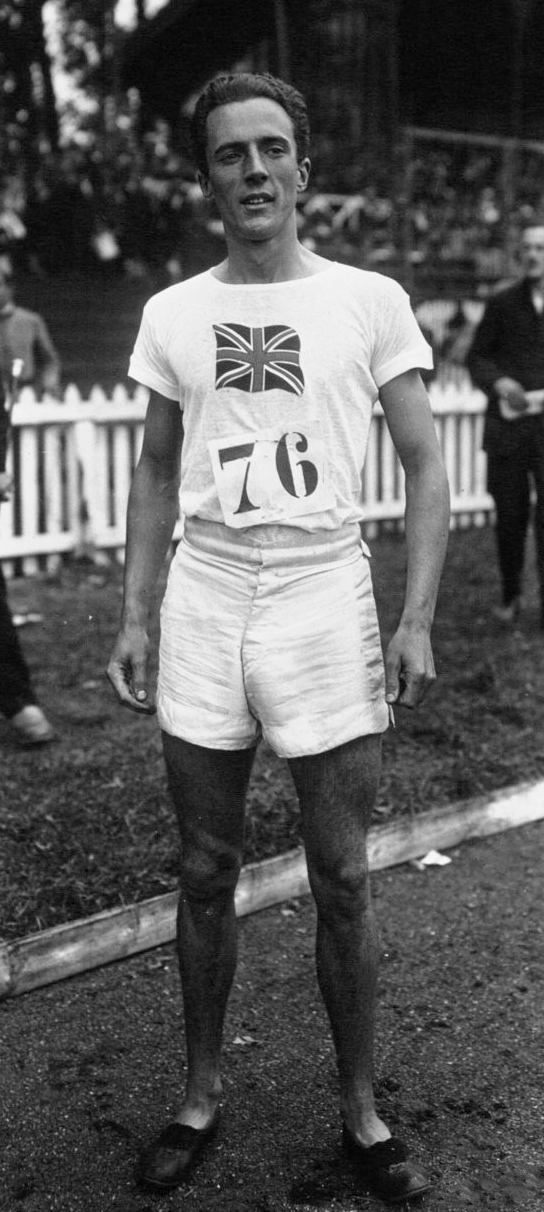
- Edgar Mountain in 1921

Personal information
- Born: 2 April 1901 Camberwell, London, England
- Died: 30 April 1985 (aged 84) Grahamstown, Eastern Cape, South Africa
- Education: University of Cambridge
- Height: 1.67 m (5 ft 6 in)
- Weight: 60 kg (130 lb)

Sport
- Sport: Athletics
- Event: 800 m
- Club: Surrey AC; University of Cambridge AC; Achilles Club

Achievements and titles
- Personal best: 800 m – 1:53.8e (1920)

Edgar Donald Mountain (2 April 1901 – 30 April 1985) was a British middle-distance runner, who competed at two Olympic Games.

== Biography ==
Mountain, born in Camberwell, London, was educated at Westminster City School, Sutton Valence School, and Corpus Christi College, Cambridge, where he was awarded a first in both parts of the natural sciences Tripos.

Mountain finished third behind Bevil Rudd in the 880 yards event at the 1920 AAA Championships. The following month at the 1920 Summer Olympics, held in Antwerp, Belgium, he represented Great Britain in the 800 metres event and finished fourth, setting a British junior record.

Mountain became the National 880 yards champion after winning the AAA Championships title at the 1921 AAA Championships and successfully defended his title the following year at the 1922 AAA Championships. He finished runner-up to Cecil Griffiths in the 880 yards in 1923.

He represented Great Britain for a second time at the 1924 Summer Olympics. After the 1924 Olympics, Mountain settled in South Africa and later became a specialist in South African geological formations and a professor at Rhodes University. He discovered several minerals, and one of them, mountainite, bears his name.
