= Anatole Bolin =

Swedish middle-distance runner

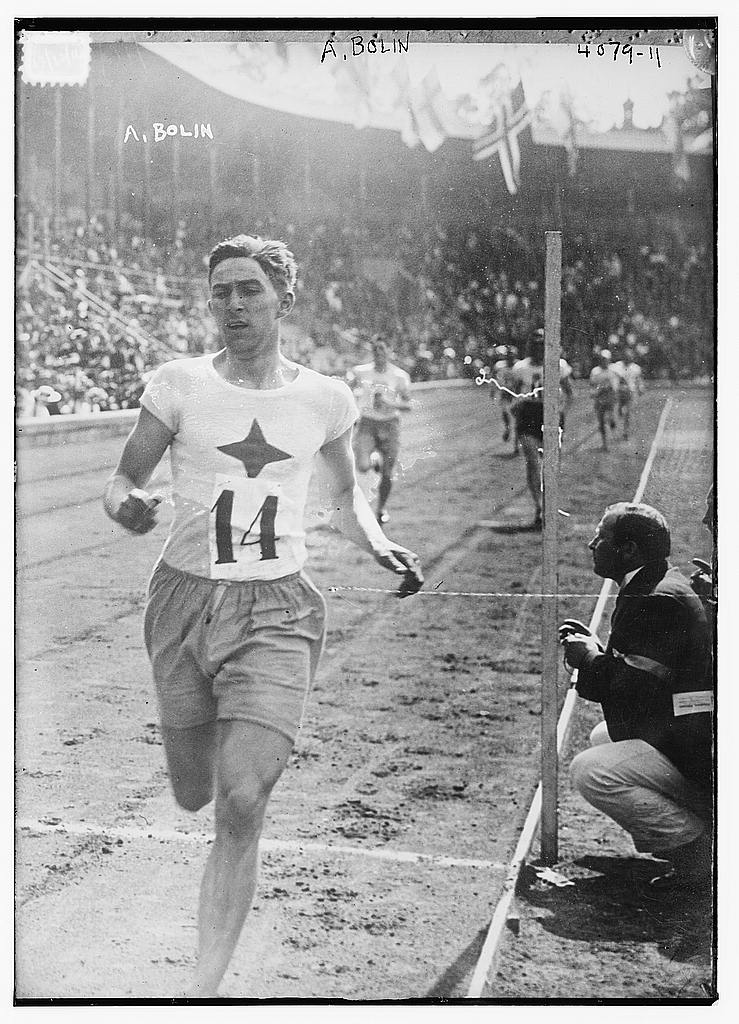
- Bolin in 1916

Personal information
- Nationality: Swedish
- Born: Jakob Pehr Anatole Dedekind Bolin; 28 September 1893
- Died: 25 January 1983 (aged 89)

Sport
- Sport: Track and field

Jakob Pehr Anatole Dedekind Bolin (28 September 1893 – 25 January 1983) was a Swedish champion middle-distance runner. He held the world record for the 1000 meter from 1918 to 1922.

== Biography ==
Bolin, born in 1893, in Svalöv, Sweden, finished second behind Albert Hill in the 880 yards event at the British 1919 AAA Championships.

The following year, he participated in the 1920 Summer Olympics in Antwerp, Belgium. He died on January 25, 1983.
