= George Schiller =

American sprinter (1900–1946)

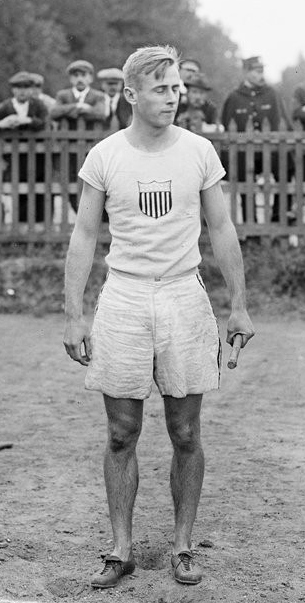
- George Schiller in 1920

Personal information
- Born: July 3, 1900 Los Angeles, California, United States
- Died: December 24, 1946 (aged 46) Los Angeles, California, United States
- Height: 175 cm (5 ft 9 in)
- Weight: 66 kg (146 lb)

Sport
- Sport: Athletics
- Events: 200 m, 400 m
- Club: LAAC, Los Angeles

Achievements and titles
- Personal bests: 200 m – 22.7 (1918); 400 m – 48.5 (1920)

George Sylvester Schiller (July 3, 1900 – December 24, 1946) was an American sprinter who competed at the 1920 Summer Olympics. He finished fourth with the American 4 × 400 m relay team and failed to reach the final of the individual 400 m event.
