= Gaston Féry =

French sprinter

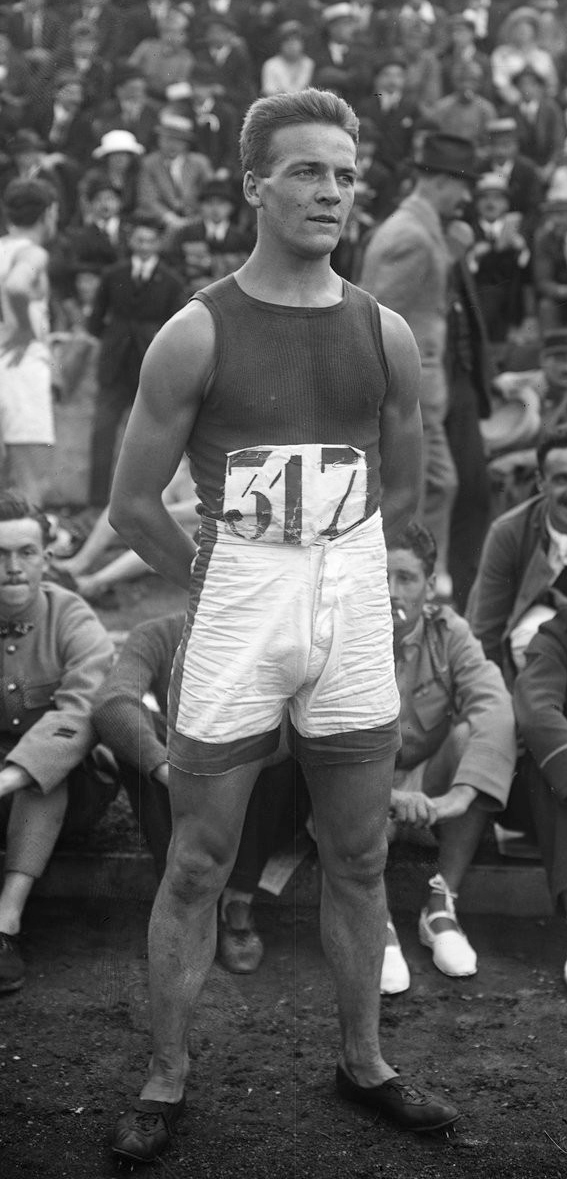
- Gaston Féry in 1920

Personal information
- Born: 24 April 1900 Longwy, France
- Died: 29 November 1985 (aged 85) Paimpol, France
- Height: 1.76 m (5 ft 9 in)
- Weight: 76 kg (168 lb)

Sport
- Sport: Athletics
- Event: 400 m
- Club: Racing Club de France, Paris

Achievements and titles
- Personal best: 400 m – 49.6 (1924)
Medal record
Representing France
Olympic Games
| Bronze medal – third place | 1920 Antwerp | 4×400 metre relay |

Gaston Féry (24 April 1900 – 29 November 1985) was a French sprinter who participated in the 1920s Olympic Games.

Born in Longwy, département Meurthe et Moselle, he competed at the 1920 and 1924 Summer Olympics in the 400 metre and 4×400 metre relay and finished third and fifth in the relay, respectively; he failed to reach the finals in his individual events. Nationally, Féry won six 400 metre titles in 1919–1924. He later co-founded the Sports Club of Meudon, where he played and coached association football.

He died in Paimpol, département Côtes-d'Armor.
