= Tyoply =

Tyoply/Teply (Russian: Тёплый; masculine), Tyoplaya/Teplaya (Тёплая; feminine), or Tyoploye/Teploye (Тёплое; neuter) is the name of several inhabited localities in Russia.

Urban localities

- Tyoploye, Tyoplo-Ogaryovsky District, Tula Oblast, a work settlement in Tyoplo-Ogaryovsky District of Tula Oblast

Rural localities

- Tyoply, Bryansk Oblast, a settlement in Novodrokovsky Selsoviet of Surazhsky District of Bryansk Oblast
- Tyoply, Krasnodar Krai, a settlement in Verkhnekubansky Rural Okrug of Novokubansky District of Krasnodar Krai
- Tyoploye, Belgorod Oblast, a selo in Strigunovsky Rural Okrug of Borisovsky District of Belgorod Oblast
- Tyoploye, Bryansk Oblast, a settlement in Verkhopolsky Selsoviet of Karachevsky District of Bryansk Oblast
- Tyoploye, Cheremisinovsky District, Kursk Oblast, a village in Lipovsky Selsoviet of Cheremisinovsky District of Kursk Oblast
- Tyoploye, Ponyrovsky District, Kursk Oblast, a village in Igishevsky Selsoviet of Ponyrovsky District of Kursk Oblast
- Tyoploye, Timsky District, Kursk Oblast, a village in Leninsky Selsoviet of Timsky District of Kursk Oblast
- Tyoploye, Dankovsky District, Lipetsk Oblast, a selo in Teplovsky Selsoviet of Dankovsky District of Lipetsk Oblast
- Tyoploye, Lebedyansky District, Lipetsk Oblast, a selo in Bolshepopovsky Selsoviet of Lebedyansky District of Lipetsk Oblast
- Tyoploye, Orenburg Oblast, a selo in Krasnovsky Selsoviet of Pervomaysky District of Orenburg Oblast
- Tyoploye, Smolensk Oblast, a village in Tokarevskoye Rural Settlement of Gagarinsky District of Smolensk Oblast
- Tyoploye, Shatsky Rural Okrug, Leninsky District, Tula Oblast, a selo in Shatsky Rural Okrug of Leninsky District of Tula Oblast
- Tyoploye, Torkhovsky Rural Okrug, Leninsky District, Tula Oblast, a village in Torkhovsky Rural Okrug of Leninsky District of Tula Oblast
- Tyoploye, Venyovsky District, Tula Oblast, a village in Rassvetovsky Rural Okrug of Venyovsky District of Tula Oblast
- Tyoploye, Tver Oblast, a village in Zelenogorskoye Rural Settlement of Vyshnevolotsky District of Tver Oblast
- Tyoplaya, a village in Kungursky District of Perm Krai

== See also ==
- Teploy, a village in Pyeldino Selo Administrative Territory of Sysolsky District of the Komi Republic
