= Earl Eby =

American middle-distance runner (1894–1970)

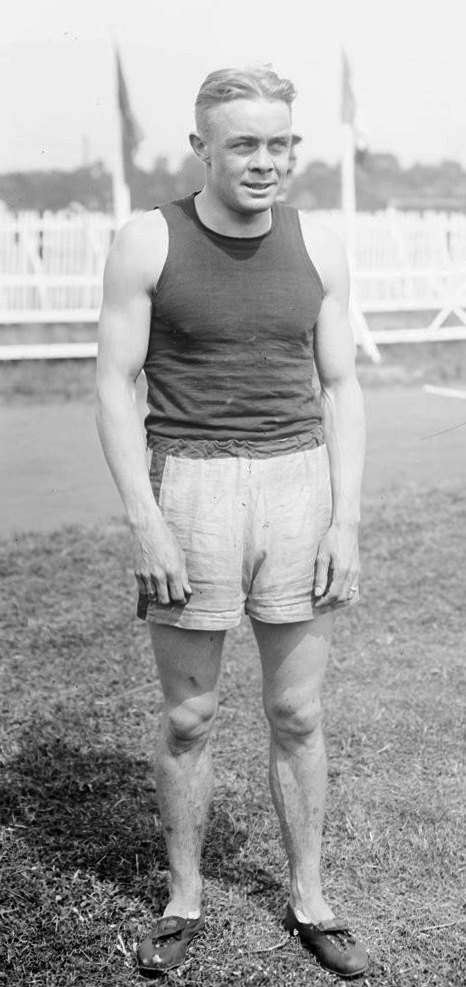
- Earl Eby at the 1919 Inter-Allied Games

Personal information
- Born: November 18, 1894 Aurora, Illinois, U.S.
- Died: December 14, 1970 (aged 76) Pottstown, Pennsylvania, U.S.
- Education: University of Pennsylvania 1922
- Occupations: Sports journalist, Phil. Bulletin
- Height: 1.79 m (5 ft 10 in)
- Weight: 60 kg (132 lb)
- Spouse: Beatrice Elizabeth Holm (1923)
- Children: 1 daughter (1925)

Sport
- Sport: Athletics, track
- Events: 400 m, 800 m
- College team: University of Pennsylvania
- Club: Chicago Athletic Association
- Coached by: Martin Delaney (Chicago AA); Lawson Robertson (U. Penn)

Achievements and titles
- Personal bests: 400 m – 48.7 (1920); 800 m – 1:53.5y (1920)
Medal record
Representing the United States
Olympic Games
Silver medal – second place	1920 Antwerp	800 m

Earl William Eby (November 18, 1894 – December 14, 1970) was an American sprint and middle distance runner who competed for the University of Pennsylvania and won a silver medal in the 800 meter event at the 1920 Summer Olympics. Earlier at the 1919 Inter-Allied Games he won the 400 m event and placed second in the 800 m to New Zealand's Daniel Mason. He won the 800 m event at the 1920 USA Outdoor Track and Field Championships. Beginning around 1924, after his athletic career, he worked as a sportswriter, focusing on track, for the Philadelphia Bulletin, a large daily newspaper. He retired from the Bulletin around 1960.

== Early life ==
Coach Delaney 1909

Eby was born in Aurora, Illinois, on November 18, 1894, the son of Ira Clinton Eby and Sarah Penrose Eby. He attended high school in Chicago, first at Calumet High and then Loyola Academy in Wilmette, Illinois. Martin Delaney coached Eby in track at the Chicago Athletic Association. In his career, Eby was a 1915 National titlist in the 880 yard event, a 1920 half mile title winner and an indoor winner of the 600 yard event in national indoor competition multiple times. Eby briefly attended the University of Chicago in his Freshman year but left by early 1916 to enroll at the University of Pennsylvania. He had originally announced his intention to the press to transfer to the University of Michigan.

Eby trained for the 1920 Olympics trials at New York's Franklin field. The trial finals were held in Cambridge, Massachusetts in July, 1926. Eby placed first in the 880 yard event with a time of 1:54.2, qualifying him for the U.S. Olympic team. Frank Loomis, Frank Foss, and Sherman Landers, who represented the Chicago Athletic Association with Eby, were also Olympic qualifiers that year.

While a Lieutenant in France serving with the U.S. infantry, Eby won the 440 meter event and earned a second place in the 880 meter event at the 1919 Paris's Inter-Allied Games.

== 1920 Olympics ==
Eby won a silver medal in the 800 m at the 1920 Antwerp Olympics with a time of 1:53.6. Albert Hill of Great Britain placed first with a time of 1:53.4, and following closely behind Eby, Bevill Rudd of the Republic of South Africa won the bronze with an estimated time of 1:53.6.

=== University of Pennsylvania ===
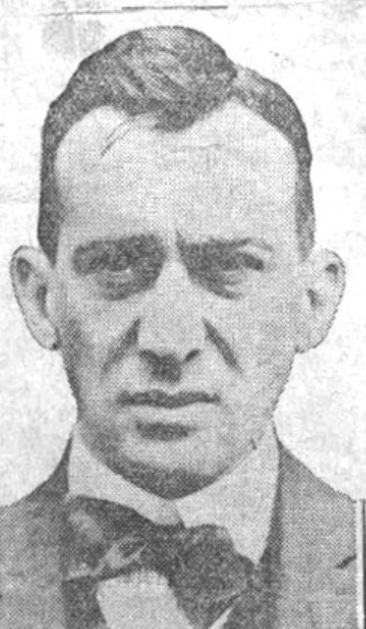
Coach L. Robertson, '16

After transferring from the University of Chicago in his Freshman year, Eby attended the University of Pennsylvania originally enrolling in the Fall of 1916, but left after completing his Freshman year to join the Army in WWI. He later returned to graduate Penn in 1922. While competing for the Penn Quakers track and field team, he was coached, trained and managed by Head Penn Coach Lawson Robertson. During some of his years at Penn, in 1920 and 1923 he won the AAU indoor 600 yard event, having first captured the title in this distance in 1917. While at Penn, Eby won an NCAA championship in the 800 meter event, becoming the first Penn athlete to win an NCAA title. He was captain of the Penn track team in 1921. As noted, he also won the 400 meter event at the 1919 Interallied meet in Paris.

=== Marriage ===
On the evening of September 29, 1923, Eby married Beatrice Elizabeth Holm at Madison Street Methodist Episcopal Church in Chester, Pennsylvania. The couple had a daughter in 1925. Eby's wife Beatrice predeceased him in 1958.

=== Careers ===
Beginning in 1924 after graduating Penn, and retiring from his track career, Eby served as a journalist for the Philadelphia Bulletin, Philadelphia's largest local daily. For 32 years, he was a noted sportswriter, covering track, tennis, golf, and football. He often covered track, the University of Pennsylvania athletics, and the well-known and highly competitive Penn Relays which brought the top track and field athletes from across America. After a 1957 illness, he retired from the Bulletin in 1960.

Eby's general health declined when he suffered a stroke in 1967 around the age of 72. While at Coventry Manor Nursing Home, at the age of 75, Eby died in Valley Forge, Pennsylvania in Chester County on the evening of December 14, 1970. He had been predeceased by his wife Beatrice in 1958. Services were held on December 16 at the Devlin-Rosmos Funeral Home. He was buried with his wife at greater Philadelphia's Ivy Hill Cemetery. He was survived by a daughter and four grandchildren.
