= Agide Simonazzi =

Italian sprinter (1896–1978)

Personal information
- Nationality: Italian
- Born: 11 February 1896
- Died: 1 April 1978 (aged 82)

Sport
- Sport: Sprinting
- Event: 400 metres

Agide Simonazzi (11 February 1896 – 1 April 1978) was an Italian sprinter. He competed in the men's 400 metres at the 1920 Summer Olympics.
