= Eric Sundblad =

Swedish sprinter

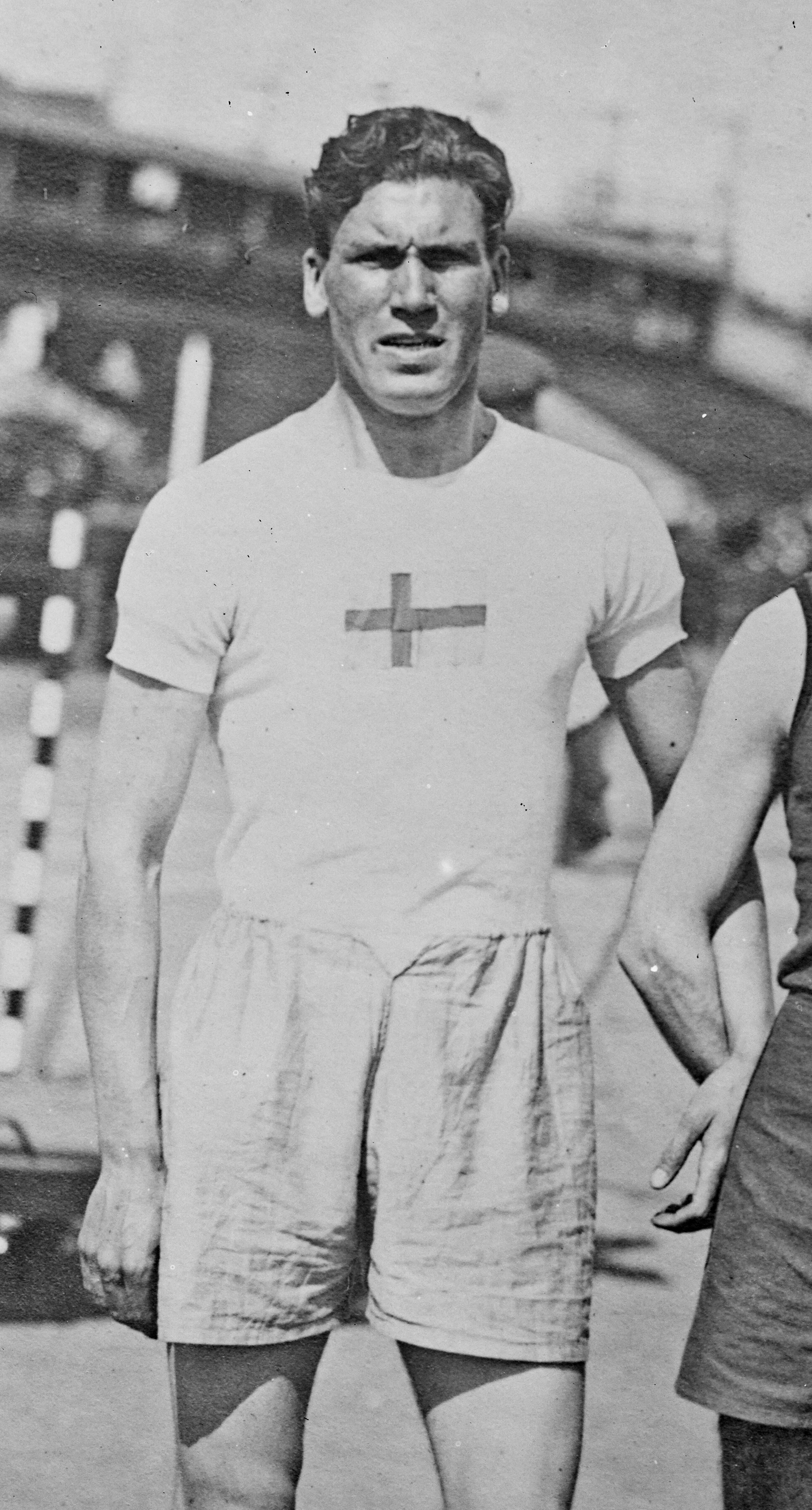
- Sundblad in 1921

Personal information
- Born: 29 July 1897 Stockholm, Sweden
- Died: 24 February 1983 (aged 85) Stockholm, Sweden

Sport
- Sport: Athletics
- Event: Sprint
- Club: IK Göta, Bromma

Achievements and titles
- Personal bests: 200 m – 23.4 (1917); 400 m – 50.1 (1920); 800 m – 1:57.0 (1919)

Eric Gustav Sundblad (29 July 1897 – 24 February 1983) was a Swedish sprinter. He competed at the 1920 Summer Olympics, where he finished fifth in the 4 × 400 m relay and failed to reach the final of the individual 400 m event.
