= Maurice Delvart =

French sprinter (1899–1986)

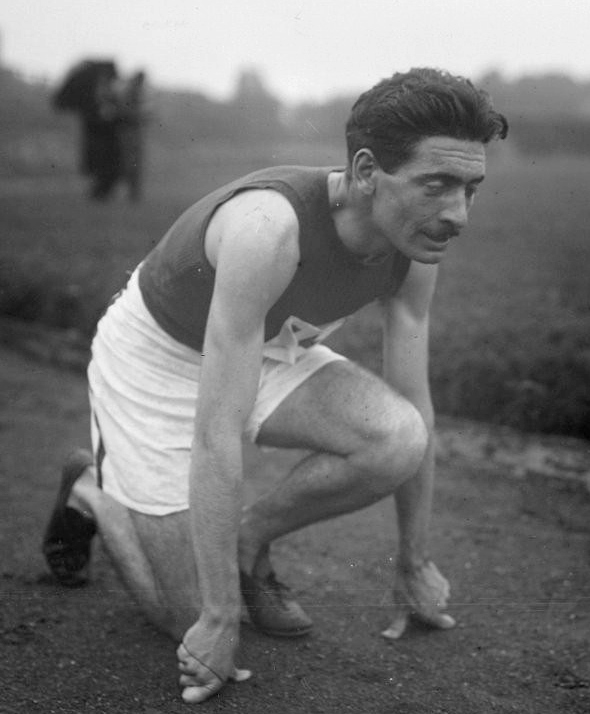
- Maurice Delvart in 1919

Personal information
- Born: 21 September 1899 Bourecq, France
- Died: 24 September 1986 (aged 87) Paris, France

Sport
- Sport: Athletics
- Event: 400 m
- Club: Stade français, Paris

Achievements and titles
- Personal best: 400 m – 50.1e (1922)
Medal record
Representing France
Olympic Games
Bronze medal – third place	1920 Antwerp	4×400 m relay

Maurice Delvart (21 September 1899 – 24 September 1986) was a French sprinter who specialised in the 400 metres. He competed at the 1920 Summer Olympics in the 400 m and 4 × 400 m relay and won a bronze medal in the relay. Nationally, Delvart finished second in the 400 m in 1919, 1920, and 1922. He set a world record over 500 m.
