= Robert E. Emery =

American psychologist

- Born: Robert Edgar Emery; August 30, 1952 (age 73)
- Education: Brown University; Stony Brook University
- Known for: Research and writings on divorce
- Spouse: Yes
- Children: Five
- Scientific career
- Fields: Psychology
- Institutions: University of Virginia
- Thesis: Marital discord and child behavior problems (1982)

Robert Edgar Emery (born August 30, 1952) is a professor of psychology and director of the Center for Children, Families, and the Law at the University of Virginia. His research focuses on topics related to family relationships, such as divorce and family violence, and their effects on children's mental health. Books that he has authored include Marriage, Divorce, and Children’s Adjustment, Renegotiating Family Relationships: Divorce, Child Custody, and Mediation, The Truth about Children and Divorce: Dealing with the Emotions So You and Your Children Can Thrive, and Two Homes, One Childhood: A Parenting Plan to Last a Lifetime. He is a fellow of the Association for Psychological Science, as well as of Divisions 12, 37, and 43 of the American Psychological Association.
