= Albert Hill (athlete) =

British athlete (1889–1969)

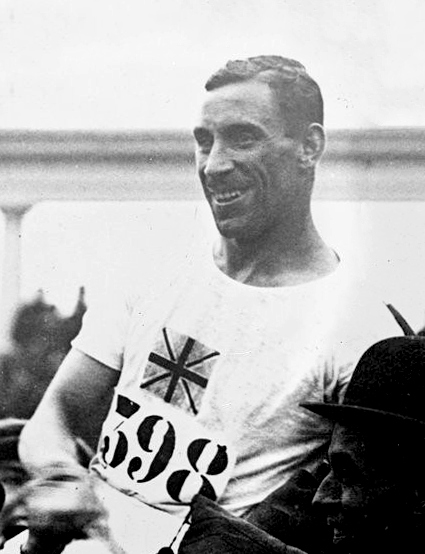
- Hill at the 1920 Olympics

Personal information
- Full name: Albert George Hill
- Born: 24 March 1889 Tooting, London
- Died: 8 January 1969 (aged 79) London, Ontario, Canada
- Height: 1.78 m (5 ft 10 in)
- Weight: 72 kg (159 lb)

Sport
- Sport: Athletics
- Events: 800 m, 1500 m
- Club: Polytechnic Harriers

Achievements and titles
- Personal bests: 800 m – 1:53.4 (1920); 1000 yd – 2:15.0 (1920); 1500 m – 4:01.8 (1920); Mile – 4:13.8 (1921)
Medal record
Representing United Kingdom
Olympic Games
Gold medal – first place	1920 Antwerp	800 metres
Gold medal – first place	1920 Antwerp	1500 metres
Silver medal – second place	1920 Antwerp	3000 m team

Albert George Hill (24 March 1889 – 8 January 1969) was a British track and field athlete. He competed at the 1920 Olympics and won gold medals in the 800 m and 1500 m and a silver medal in the 3000 m team race.

== Biography ==
Hill started out as a long-distance runner, winning the British AAA championships over 4 miles at the 1910 AAA Championships.

During World War I he served with the Royal Flying Corps in France, and after the war changed to middle-distance running. Coached by Sam Mussabini (coach of 100 m Olympic Champions Reggie Walker and Harold Abrahams), he won the 880 yd national title and 1 mile national title at the 1919 AAA Championships and then equalled the British record of 4:16.8 for 1 mile. He nearly was not selected for the Olympics the following year, the selectors considering the 31-year-old Hill too old. Finally, he was allowed to take part at the Olympics, which were held in Antwerp, Belgium. He made the final in the 800m, which was a closely contested race. In the end, the 31-year-old Hill beat American Earl Eby for the gold, setting a British record of 1:53.4 on a slow track.

Two days later, Hill completed the middle distance double by winning the 1500 m as well, thus completing a "double" not replicated by a British athlete until Kelly Holmes at the 2004 Olympics. Helped by his compatriot, Philip Baker (who would receive the Nobel Peace Prize in 1959), he won comfortably, with Baker in second in a time of 4:01.8. Hill also competed in the 3000 m team race event, in which the British team finished second, earning Hill's third Olympic medal.

Hill won the 1921 AAA mile championship in a British record of 4:13.8, at the 1921 AAA Championships, this was 1.2 seconds outside the world record and the second fastest amateur time ever.

Hill ended his running career in 1921 and became a coach himself, his most famous protégé being Sydney Wooderson. He emigrated to Canada shortly after World War II, and died there in 1969.

In 2010, he was inducted into the England Athletics Hall of Fame.
