= Frank Shea =

American sprinter

- Born: March 19, 1894; Irwin, Pennsylvania, United States
- Died: August 6, 1978 (aged 84); Harrisburg, Pennsylvania, United States
- Known for: AAU champion, 440-yard dash (1917, 1919, 1920); NCAA champion, 440-yard dash (1921)

Frank J. Shea (March 19, 1894 – August 6, 1978) was an American track and field athlete. While competing for the University of Pittsburgh, he won the 440-yard dash competition at the Amateur Athletic Union championships in 1917, 1919 and 1920 and at the 1918 IC4A meet. He also won the 440-yard dash at the first NCAA track and field championships in 1921 with a time of 49 seconds.

He was a member of the U.S. Olympic team at the 1920 Summer Olympics in Antwerp, Belgium, and narrowly missed winning a medal in two events. In the 400-meters finals, Shea finished fourth after a three-way photo finish for the silver medal, as three runners (Guy Butler, Nils Engdahl and Shea) finished with the same time of 49.9 seconds. In the four-by-400 meters relay race, Shea ran on the American relay team that finished in fourth place—one second behind the first-place British team and one-tenth of a second behind the third-place French team. Shea's best time in the 440-yard race was 47.6 seconds in 1918. In May 1922, Shea was appointed as the track coach at the University of Pittsburgh. Shea died in 1978 at Harrisburg, Pennsylvania, at age 84.

== See also ==
- 1921 NCAA Men's Track and Field Championships
- Athletics at the 1920 Summer Olympics – Men's 400 metres
- Athletics at the 1920 Summer Olympics – Men's 4 × 100 metres relay
