= Robert Emery (athlete) =

American sprinter (1898–1934)

Personal information
- Full name: Robert Simpson Emery
- Born: August 12, 1898 Chicago, Illinois, United States
- Died: January 6, 1934 (aged 35) Chicago, Illinois, United States
- Education: University of Illinois
- Height: 175 cm (5 ft 9 in)
- Weight: 64 kg (141 lb)

Sport
- Country: United States
- Sport: Athletics
- Event: 400 metres
- Club: Chicago Athletic Association

Robert Simpson Emery (August 12, 1898 – January 6, 1934) was an American sprinter. He competed in the men's 400 metres at the 1920 Summer Olympics.

== Personal life ==
Emery was a member of the Chicago Athletic Association and he attended the University of Illinois, becoming captain in varsity track in 1920.

Emery was a Jehovah's Witness, serving at their Brooklyn branch. He was a convention aide at the 1928 I.B.S.A. general convention in Detroit, Michigan, and secretary and treasurer of The Golden Age until his death in 1934.
