= Henri Bernard (athlete) =

French hurdler

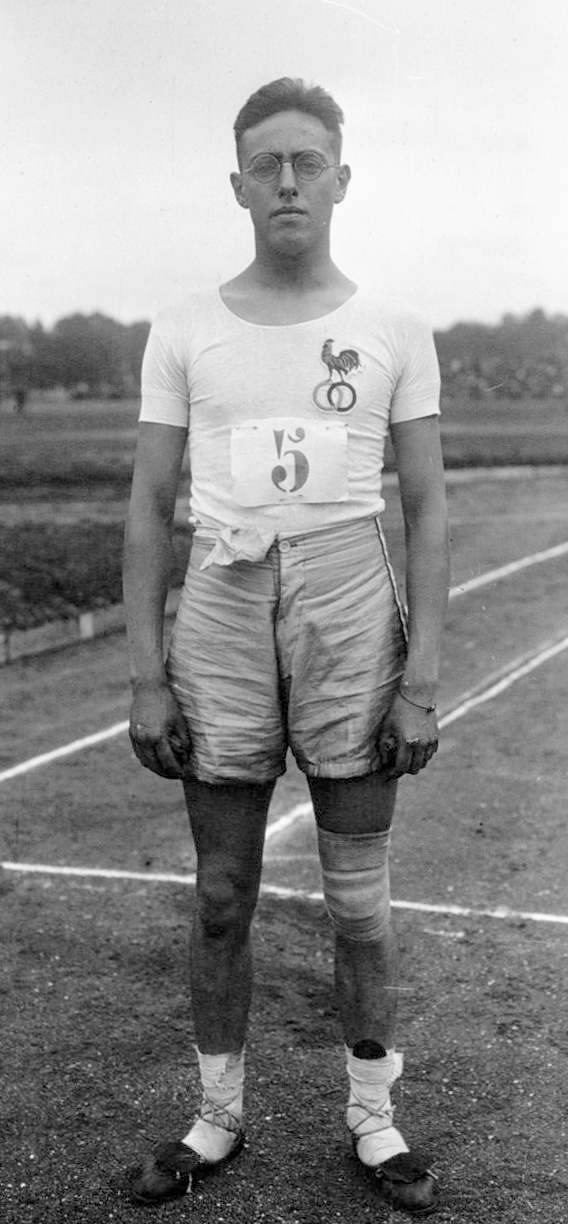
- Henri Bernard in 1921

Personal information
- Born: 24 July 1900 Boulogne-Billancourt, France
- Died: 11 May 1967 (aged 66) Névez, France
- Height: 1.80 m (5 ft 11 in)
- Weight: 78 kg (172 lb)

Sport
- Sport: Athletics
- Event: Hurdles
- Club: CASG Paris

Achievements and titles
- Personal bests: 110 mH – 15.3 (1923); 400 mH – 58.2 (1920)

Henri Pierre Bernard (24 July 1900 – 11 May 1967) was a French hurdler, who competed at two Olympic Games.

== Career ==
Bernard competed in the 110 metre event at the 1920 Summer Olympics and 1924 Summer Olympics, but failed to reach the finals.

Bernard won the AAA Championships title in the 120 yards hurdles event at the British 1921 AAA Championships.
