= Bertil Jansson =

Swedish shot putter

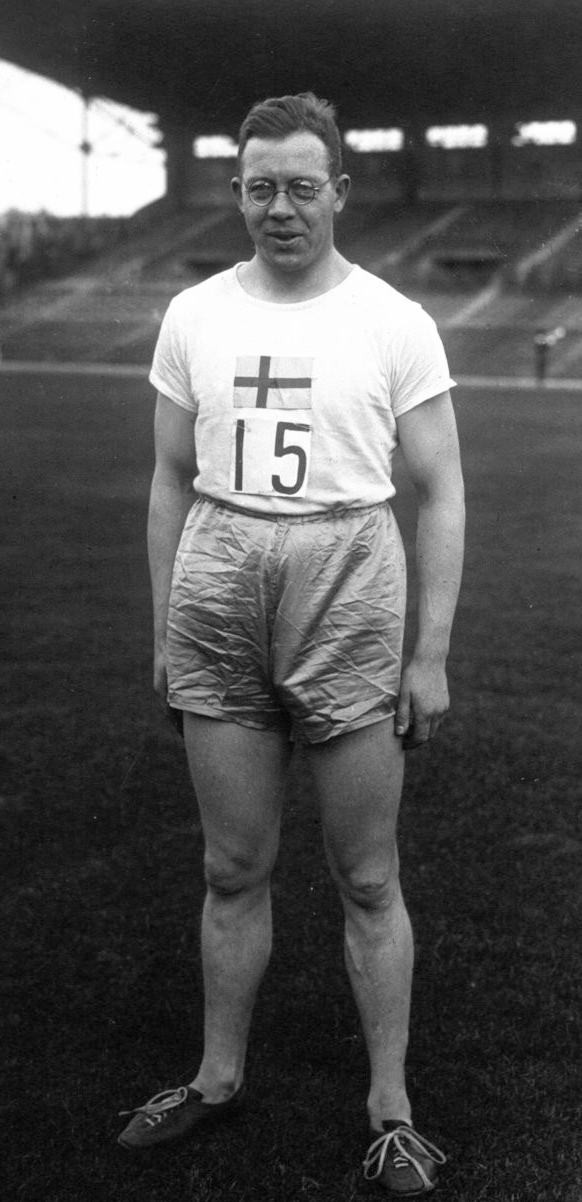
- Bertil Jansson in 1926

Personal information
- Born: 29 June 1898 Jönköping, Sweden
- Died: 25 September 1981 (aged 83) Norrköping, Sweden

Sport
- Sport: Athletics
- Events: Shot put, high jump, triple jump, pole vault, decathlon
- Club: Örebro SK

Achievements and titles
- Personal bests: SP – 15.08 m (1927); HJ – 1.80 m (1918); TJ – 13.68 m (1918); PV – 3.40 m (1918); Decathlon – 6393 (1918)

Oskar Bertil Petrus Jansson (29 June 1898 – 25 September 1981) was a Swedish athlete, who competed at the 1920 and 1924 Summer Olympics.

== Career ==
Jansson won the Swedish shot put title in 1916 and 1918–1929. In 1918 he also competed domestically in decathlon and the following year, Jansson won the British AAA Championships shot put title at the 1919 AAA Championships.

At the 1920 Olympic Games, Jansson competed in the shot put at the 1920 and finished in ninth place. Jansson won another British AAA shot put title at the 1921 AAA Championships and also finished third behind Benjamin Howard Baker in the high jump event at the same championships.

Four years later, at the 1924 Olympic Games, Jansson finished in eighth place during the shot put event.
