= Omer Corteyn =

Belgian sprinter

Personal information
- Nationality: Belgian
- Born: 10 October 1896
- Died: 16 December 1979 (aged 83)

Sport
- Sport: Sprinting
- Event: 400 metres

Omer Corteyn (10 October 1896 – 16 December 1979) was a Belgian sprinter. He competed in the men's 400 metres at the 1920 Summer Olympics.
