= François Morren =

Belgian sprinter

Personal information
- Nationality: Belgian
- Born: 16 April 1899
- Died: 9 December 1985 (aged 86)

Sport
- Sport: Sprinting
- Event: 400 metres

François Morren (16 April 1899 – 9 December 1985) was a Belgian sprinter. He competed in the men's 400 metres at the 1920 Summer Olympics.
