= Robert Lindsay (athlete) =

British sprinter (1890–1958)

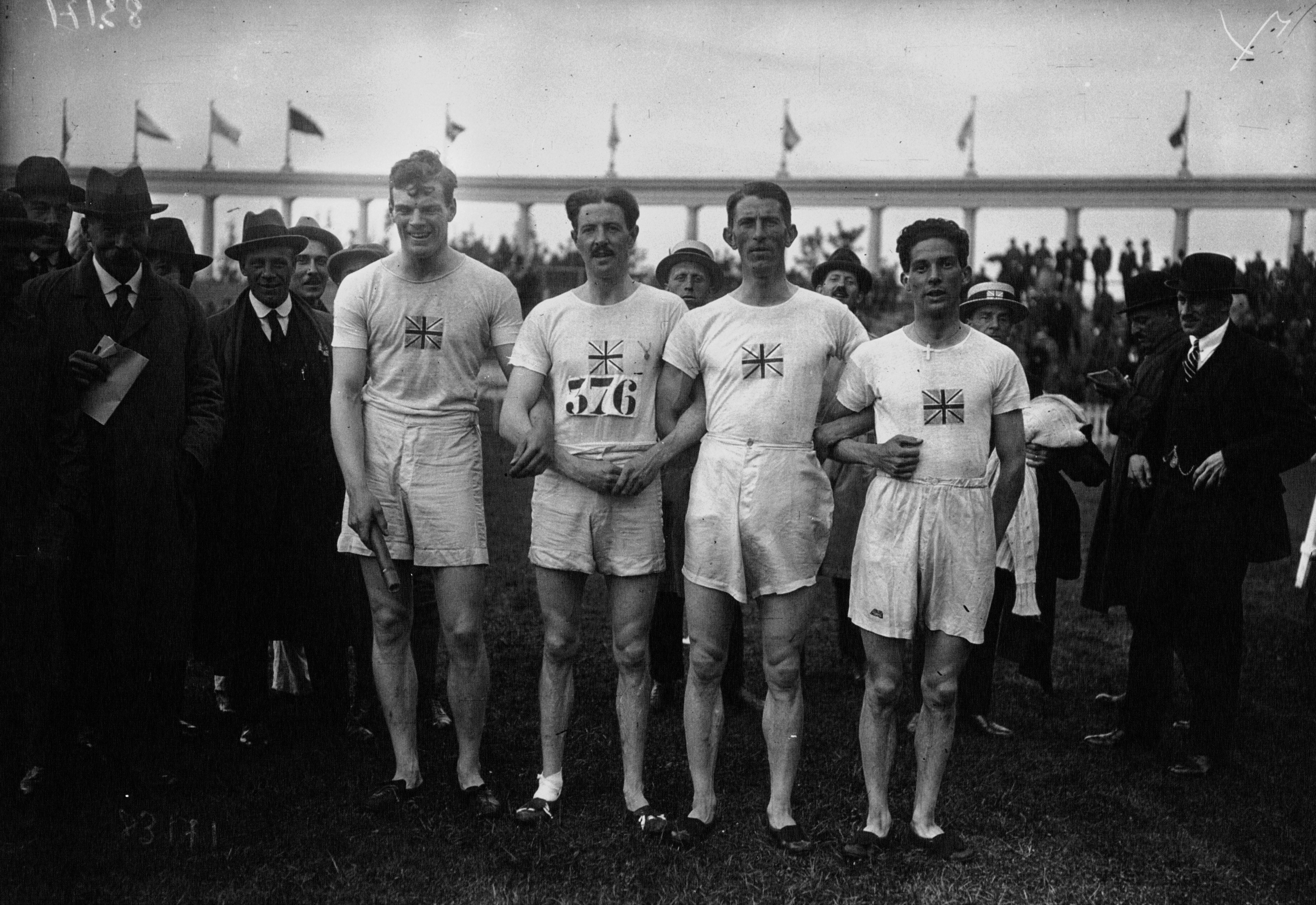
- British relay team at the 1920 Olympics, Lindsay is 2nd right

Personal information
- Born: 18 April 1890 Wandsworth, London
- Died: 21 October 1958 (aged 68) Battersea, London

Sport
- Sport: Athletics
- Event: Sprint
- Club: Blackheath Harriers

Achievements and titles
- Personal bests: 220 yd – 22.8 (1914); 440 yd – 50.4 (1921)
Medal record
Representing Great Britain
Olympic Games
Gold medal – first place	1920 Antwerp	4 × 400 m relay

Robert Alexander Lindsay (18 April 1890 – 21 October 1958) was a British sprinter who competed at the 1920 Summer Olympics.

== Career ==
At the 1920 Olympic Games, he reached the quarterfinals in the 400 metres and ran the second leg of the British 4 × 400 metres relay team, which won the gold medal.

The following year, Lindsay became the national 440 yards champion after winning the AAA Championships title at the 1921 AAA Championships beating the Olympic champion Bevil Rudd.
