= Karel Přibyl =

Czechoslovak sprinter

Personal information
- Nationality: Czechoslovak
- Born: 18 September 1899
- Died: 1968 (aged 68–69)

Sport
- Sport: Sprinting
- Event(s): 400 metres, 800 metres

Karel Přibyl (18 September 1899 – 1968) was a Czechoslovak sprinter. He competed in the 400 metres and the 800 metres at the 1920 Summer Olympics and the 1924 Summer Olympics.
