= Jules Migeot =

Belgian sprinter

Personal information
- Nationality: Belgian
- Born: 4 November 1898
- Died: 12 November 1986 (aged 88)

Sport
- Sport: Sprinting
- Event: 400 metres

Jules Migeot (4 November 1898 – 18 December 1986) was a Belgian sprinter. He competed in the 400 metres at the 1920 Summer Olympics and the 1924 Summer Olympics.
