= Josef Teplý =

Czech middle-distance runner

Personal information
- Nationality: Czech
- Born: 1902

Sport
- Sport: Middle-distance running
- Event: 800 metres

Josef Teplý (born 1902, date of death unknown) was a Czech middle-distance runner. He competed in the men's 800 metres at the 1920 Summer Olympics.
