= Bevil Rudd =

South African athlete

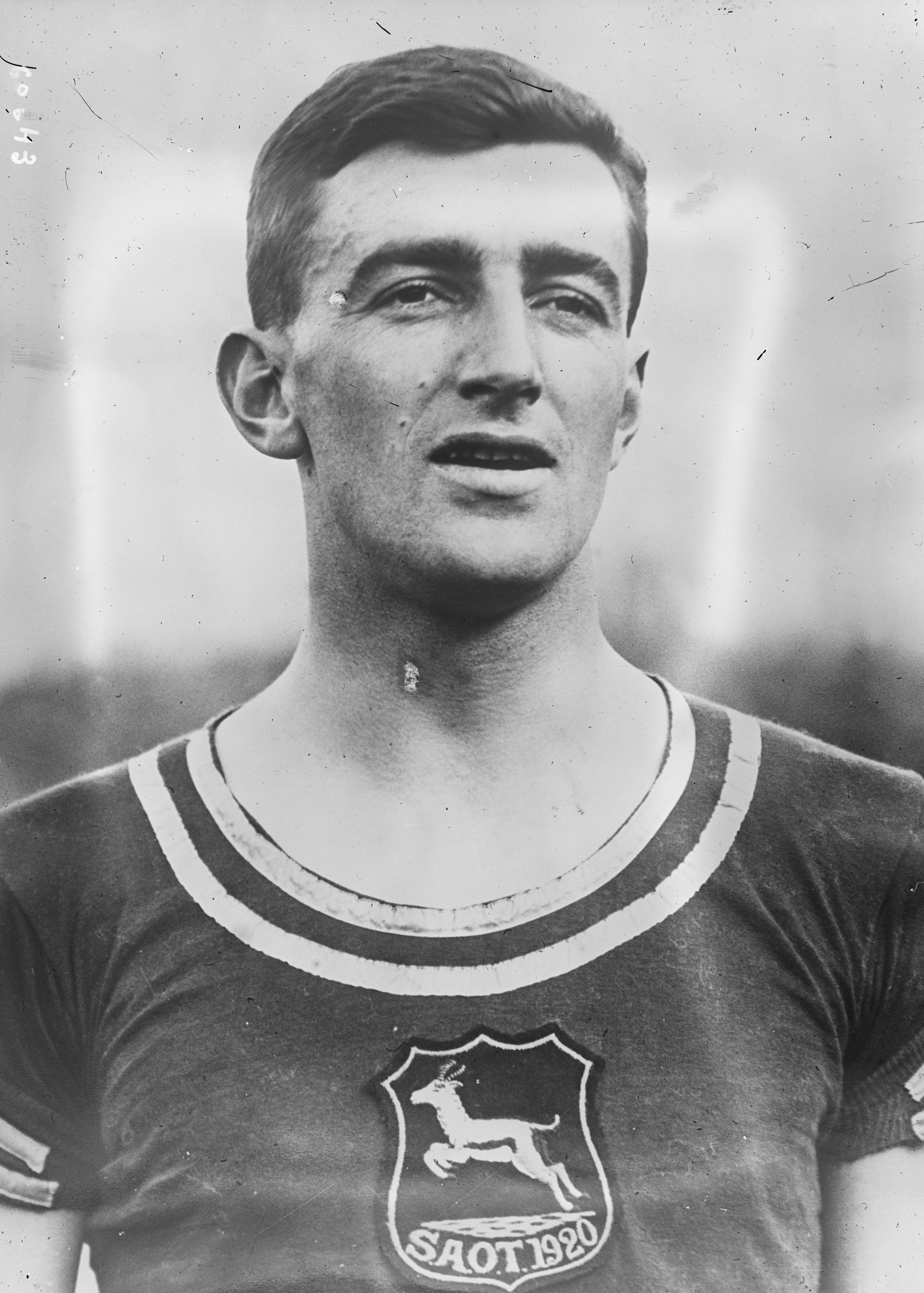

Personal information
- Born: 5 October 1894 Kimberley, Northern Cape
- Died: 2 February 1948 (aged 53) South Africa
- Height: 180 cm (5 ft 11 in)
- Weight: 77 kg (170 lb)

Sport
- Sport: Athletics
- Event: Sprints/400m/middle-distance
- Club: University of Oxford AC; Achilles Club
Medal record
Men's athletics
Representing South Africa
Gold medal – first place	1920 Antwerp	400 metres
Silver medal – second place	1920 Antwerp	4 × 400 m relay
Bronze medal – third place	1920 Antwerp	800 metres

Bevil Gordon D'Urban Rudd (5 October 1894 – 2 February 1948) was a South African athlete, the 1920 Olympic Champion in the 400 metres.

== Biography ==
Rudd was born in Kimberley. He was the son of Henry Percy Rudd and Mable Mina Blyth; paternal grandson of Charles Rudd, who co-founded the De Beers diamond mining company, and Frances Chiappini, and maternal grandson of Captain Matthew Smith Blyth CMG, chief magistrate of the Transkei, and Elizabeth Cornelia Philpott.

During his schooling at St. Andrew's College, Grahamstown (Upper House) he excelled both as a student and as an athlete, and he was granted a scholarship for the University of Oxford where he studied at Trinity College, Oxford. Rudd served in the First World War, and was awarded a Military Cross for bravery.

Ruud won two British AAA Championships titles in the 440 yards and 880 yards events at the 1920 AAA Championships. The following month at the 1920 Olympic Games held in Antwerp, Belgium, Rudd won his gold medal.

Rudd finished runner-up in both the 440 and 880 yards at the 1921 AAA Championships before completing his studies in England, and returning to South Africa, working as a sports journalist.

He married Ursula Mary Knight, daughter of Clifford Hume Knight, the Italian Consul to Cape Town, in 1926; they had at least two sons: Bevil John Blyth Rudd and Clifford Robin David Rudd, the South African Cricketer.

In 1930, he became an editor for The Daily Telegraph, a position he held until after the Second World War. Shortly after his return to South Africa, he died there at age 53.
