= Athletics at the 1928 Summer Olympics – Men's 400 metres hurdles =

Men's 400 metres hurdles at the Games of the IX Olympiad
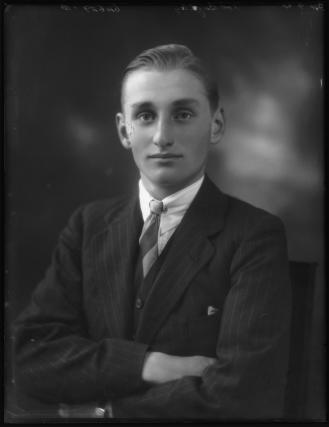
- David Burghley
- Venue: Olympic Stadium
- Dates: July 29, 1928 (heats & semifinals); July 30, 1928 (final)
- Competitors: 25 from 13 nations
- Winning time: 53.4 =OR

Medalists
| 1st place, gold medalist(s) | | David Burghley; Great Britain |
| 2nd place, silver medalist(s) | | Frank Cuhel; United States |
| 3rd place, bronze medalist(s) | | Morgan Taylor; United States |

The men's 400 metres hurdles event at the 1928 Olympic Games took place between July 29 & July 30. There were 25 athletes from 13 nations. The maximum number of athletes per nation was 4. The event was won by David Burghley of Great Britain, the first time a hurdler not from the United States had won. Americans Frank Cuhel and Morgan Taylor took silver and bronze. Taylor, who had been the defending champion, was the second man to win multiple medals in the 400 metres hurdles.

== Background ==
This was the sixth time the event was held. It had been introduced along with the men's 200 metres hurdles in 1900, with the 200 being dropped after 1904 and the 400 being held through 1908 before being left off the 1912 programme. However, when the Olympics returned in 1920 after World War I, the men's 400 metres hurdles was back and would continue to be contested at every Games thereafter.

Two of the six finalists from the 1924 Games returned: gold medalist Morgan Taylor of the United States and silver medalist Erik Wilén of Finland. Taylor had won the 1924, 1925, and 1926 AAU titles and set a new world record at the U.S. Trials; he was favored in the event.

India and Poland each made their debut in the event. The United States made its sixth appearance, the only nation to have competed at every edition of the event to that point.

== Competition format ==
The competition featured the three-round format introduced in 1908: quarterfinals, semifinals, and a final. Ten sets of hurdles were set on the course. The hurdles were 3 feet (91.5 centimetres) tall and were placed 35 metres apart beginning 45 metres from the starting line, resulting in a 40 metres home stretch after the last hurdle. The 400 metres track was now standard.

There were 6 quarterfinal heats, with between 3 and 6 athletes each. The top 2 men in each quarterfinal advanced to the semifinals. The 12 semifinalists were divided into 2 semifinals of 6 athletes each, with the top 3 in each semifinal advancing to the 6-man final.

== Records ==
These were the standing world and Olympic records (in seconds) prior to the 1928 Summer Olympics.

| World record | Morgan Taylor (USA) | 52.0 | Philadelphia, United States | 4 July 1928 |
| Olympic record | Erik Wilén (FIN) | 53.8 | Paris, France | 7 July 1924 |

Morgan Taylor set a new Olympic record with 53.4 seconds in the first semifinal. David Burghley matched that time in the final.

== Schedule ==
| Date | Time | Round |
|---|---|---|
| Sunday, 29 July 1928 | 14:00; 17:30 | Quarterfinals; Semifinals |
| Monday, 30 July 1928 | 15:10 | Final |

== Results ==
=== Quarterfinals ===
The first two finishers in each of the six heats advanced to the semifinal round.

==== Quarterfinal 1 ====
| Rank | Athlete | Nation | Time | Notes |
|---|---|---|---|---|
| 1 | David Burghley | Great Britain | 57.0 | Q |
| 2 | Robert Maxwell | United States | 57.2 | Q |
| 3 | Evangelos Moiropoulos | Greece | 58.4 | |
| 4 | André Adelheim | France | 59.2 | |
| 5 | Herman Larsen | Denmark | 1:00.0 | |

==== Quarterfinal 2 ====
| Rank | Athlete | Nation | Time | Notes |
|---|---|---|---|---|
| 1 | Johnny Gibson | United States | 57.0 | Q |
| 2 | Frederick Chauncy | Great Britain | Unknown | Q |
| 3 | Marcel Swinnen | Belgium | Unknown | |
| — | Pierre Arnaudin | France | DNF | |

==== Quarterfinal 3 ====
| Rank | Athlete | Nation | Time | Notes |
|---|---|---|---|---|
| 1 | Roger Viel | France | 56.2 | Q |
| 2 | Thomas Livingston-Learmonth | Great Britain | 56.4 | Q |
| 3 | Jukka Matilainen | Finland | 56.7 | |
| 4 | Alf Watson | Australia | 57.8 | |

==== Quarterfinal 4 ====
| Rank | Athlete | Nation | Time | Notes |
|---|---|---|---|---|
| 1 | Morgan Taylor | United States | 55.2 | Q |
| 2 | Erkka Wilén | Finland | 56.5 | Q |
| 3 | Erik Kjellström | Sweden | 56.6 | |

==== Quarterfinal 5 ====
| Rank | Athlete | Nation | Time | Notes |
|---|---|---|---|---|
| 1 | Sten Pettersson | Sweden | 55.8 | Q |
| 2 | Stefan Kostrzewski | Poland | 56.0 | Q |
| 3 | Lance Percival | Great Britain | Unknown | |

==== Quarterfinal 6 ====
| Rank | Athlete | Nation | Time | Notes |
|---|---|---|---|---|
| 1 | Frank Cuhel | United States | 54.6 | Q |
| 2 | Luigi Facelli | Italy | 55.1 | Q |
| 3 | Louis Lundgren | Denmark | 55.9 | |
| 4 | Warren Montabone | Canada | 56.5 | |
| 5 | Édouard Max-Robert | France | Unknown | |
| 6 | S. Abdul Hamid | India | Unknown | |

=== Semifinals ===
==== Semifinal 1 ====
| Rank | Athlete | Nation | Time | Notes |
|---|---|---|---|---|
| 1 | Morgan Taylor | United States | 53.4 | Q, OR |
| 2 | Frank Cuhel | United States | 53.6 | Q |
| 3 | David Burghley | Great Britain | 53.9 | Q |
| 4 | Roger Viel | France | 57.6 | |
| 5 | Stefan Kostrzewski | Poland | 58.0 | |
| 6 | Frederick Chauncy | Great Britain | Unknown | |

==== Semifinal 2 ====
| Rank | Athlete | Nation | Time | Notes |
|---|---|---|---|---|
| 1 | Thomas Livingston-Learmonth | Great Britain | 54.0 | Q |
| 2 | Luigi Facelli | Italy | 54.2 | Q |
| 3 | Sten Pettersson | Sweden | 54.3 | Q |
| 4 | Johnny Gibson | United States | 54.4 | |
| 5 | Erkka Wilén | Finland | 54.5 | |
| 6 | Robert Maxwell | United States | Unknown | |

=== Final ===
| Rank | Athlete | Nation | Time | Notes |
|---|---|---|---|---|
| 1st place, gold medalist(s) | David Burghley | Great Britain | 53.4 | =OR |
| 2nd place, silver medalist(s) | Frank Cuhel | United States | 53.6 | |
| 3rd place, bronze medalist(s) | Morgan Taylor | United States | 53.6 | |
| 4 | Sten Pettersson | Sweden | 53.8 | |
| 5 | Thomas Livingston-Learmonth | Great Britain | 54.2 | |
| 6 | Luigi Facelli | Italy | 55.8 | |

== Results summary ==
| Rank | Athlete | Nation | Quarterfinals | Semifinals | Final | Notes |
|---|---|---|---|---|---|---|
| 1st place, gold medalist(s) | David Burghley | Great Britain | 57.0 | 53.9 | 53.4 | =OR |
| 2nd place, silver medalist(s) | Frank Cuhel | United States | 54.6 | 53.6 | 53.6 | |
| 3rd place, bronze medalist(s) | Morgan Taylor | United States | 55.2 | 53.4 | 53.6 | OR |
| 4 | Sten Pettersson | Sweden | 55.8 | 54.3 | 53.8 | |
| 5 | Thomas Livingston-Learmonth | Great Britain | 56.4 | 54.0 | 54.2 | |
| 6 | Luigi Facelli | Italy | 55.1 | 54.2 | 55.8 | |
| 7 | Johnny Gibson | United States | 57.0 | 54.4 | Did not advance | |
| 8 | Erkka Wilén | Finland | 56.5 | 54.5 | Did not advance | |
| 9 | Roger Viel | France | 56.2 | 57.6 | Did not advance | |
| 10 | Stefan Kostrzewski | Poland | 56.0 | 58.0 | Did not advance | |
| 11 | Frederick Chauncy | Great Britain | Unknown | Unknown | Did not advance | 6th in semifinal |
| 11 | Robert Maxwell | United States | 57.2 | Unknown | Did not advance | 6th in semifinal |
| 13 | Louis Lundgren | Denmark | 55.9 | Did not advance | | |
| 14 | Warren Montabone | Canada | 56.5 | Did not advance | | |
| 15 | Erik Kjellström | Sweden | 56.6 | Did not advance | | |
| 16 | Jukka Matilainen | Finland | 56.7 | Did not advance | | |
| 17 | Alf Watson | Australia | 57.8 | Did not advance | | |
| 18 | Evangelos Moiropoulos | Greece | 58.4 | Did not advance | | |
| 19 | André Adelheim | France | 59.2 | Did not advance | | |
| 20 | Herman Larsen | Denmark | 1:00.0 | Did not advance | | |
| 21 | Lance Percival | Great Britain | Unknown | Did not advance | | 3rd in quarterfinal |
| 21 | Marcel Swinnen | Belgium | Unknown | Did not advance | | 3rd in quarterfinal |
| 23 | Édouard Max-Robert | France | Unknown | Did not advance | | 5th in quarterfinal |
| 24 | S. Abdul Hamid | India | Unknown | Did not advance | | 6th in quarterfinal |
| 25 | Pierre Arnaudin | France | DNF | Did not advance | | |
