= Athletics at the 1924 Summer Olympics – Men's 400 metres hurdles =

Men's 400 metres hurdles at the Games of the VIII Olympiad
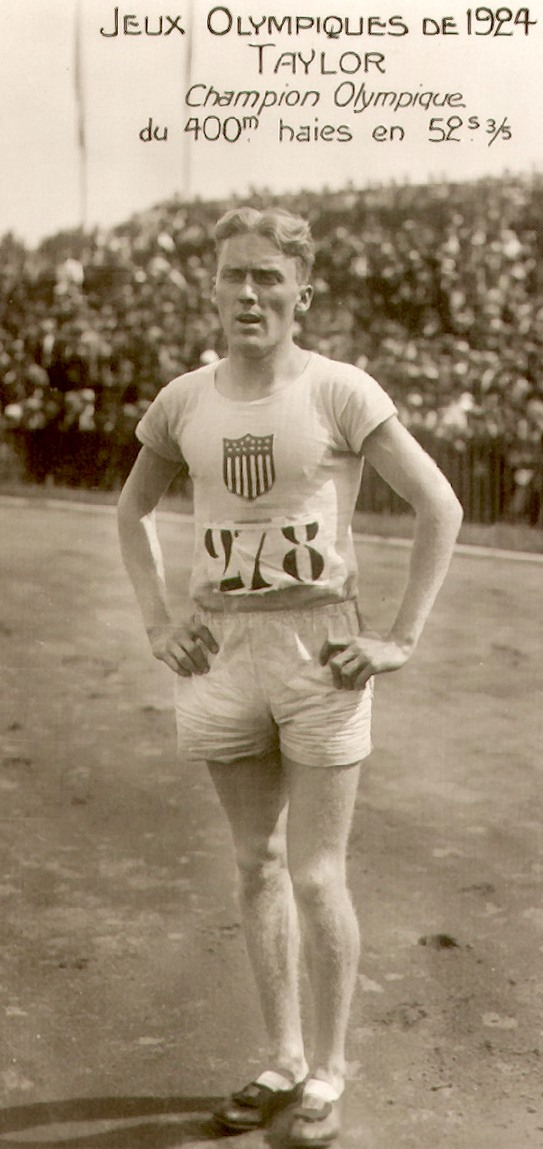
- Morgan Taylor
- Venue: Stade Olympique Yves-du-Manoir
- Dates: July 6, 1924 (quarterfinals and semifinals); July 7, 1924 (final)
- Competitors: 23 from 13 nations
- Winning time: 52.6

Medalists
1st place, gold medalist(s)		Morgan Taylor; United States
2nd place, silver medalist(s)		Erik Wilén; Finland
3rd place, bronze medalist(s)		Ivan Riley; United States

Official Video

The men's 400 metres hurdles event was part of the track and field athletics programme at the 1924 Summer Olympics. The competition was held on Sunday, July 6, 1924, and on Monday, July 7, 1924. Twenty-three hurdlers from 13 nations competed. The maximum number of athletes per nation was 4. The event was won by Morgan Taylor of the United States, the fifth consecutive victory by an American in the event. Erik Wilén received silver (following the disqualification of Charles Brookins), Finland's first medal in the men's 400 metres hurdles. Another American, Ivan Riley, took bronze.

== Background ==
This was the fifth time the event was held. It had been introduced along with the men's 200 metres hurdles in 1900, with the 200 being dropped after 1904 and the 400 being held through 1908 before being left off the 1912 programme. However, when the Olympics returned in 1920 after World War I, the men's 400 metres hurdles was back and would continue to be contested at every Games thereafter.

One of the six finalists from the 1920 Games returned: fourth-place finisher Géo André of France. The event, a very unusual one before 1920, was becoming more common; the AAU had added it to its programme. Morgan Taylor was the AAU champion and U.S. trials winner.

Argentina, Chile, Denmark, Greece, and Italy each made their debut in the event. The United States made its fifth appearance, the only nation to have competed at every edition of the event to that point.

== Competition format ==
The competition featured the three-round format introduced in 1908: quarterfinals, semifinals, and a final. Ten sets of hurdles were set on the course. The hurdles were 3 feet (91.5 centimetres) tall and were placed 35 metres apart beginning 45 metres from the starting line, resulting in a 40 metres home stretch after the last hurdle.

There were 6 quarterfinal heats, with between 3 and 5 athletes each. The top 2 men in each quarterfinal advanced to the semifinals. The 12 semifinalists were divided into 2 semifinals of 6 athletes each, with the top 3 in each semifinal advancing to the 6-man final.

As with all other races the track was 500 metres in circumference.

== Records ==
These were the standing world and Olympic records (in seconds) prior to the 1924 Summer Olympics.

World record	Frank Loomis (USA)	54.0	Antwerp, Belgium	16 August 1920
Olympic record	Frank Loomis (USA)	54.0	Antwerp, Belgium	16 August 1920

Morgan Taylor won the U.S. trials in a time of 52.6 but he also knocked over a hurdle, which was against the rules in force at that time. He did the same in the final of this competition so the time he set, again 52.6, was also not ratified as world record. As the second placed Erik Wilén used a similar style his 53.8 were also not accepted as world record but tolerated as Olympic record.

== Schedule ==
Date	Time	Round
Sunday, 6 July 1924	14:00; 16:30	Quarterfinals; Semifinals
Monday, 7 July 1924	15:00	Final

== Results ==
=== Quarterfinals ===
All heats were held on Sunday, July 6, 1924.

The best two finishers of every heat qualified for the semifinals.

==== Quarterfinal 1 ====
Rank	Athlete	Nation	Time	Notes
1	Charles Brookins	United States	54.8	Q
2	Humberto Lara	Chile	56.5	Q
3	Philip MacDonald	Canada	56.8	

==== Quarterfinal 2 ====
Rank	Athlete	Nation	Time	Notes
1	Chan Coulter	United States	55.0	Q
2	Erik Wilén	Finland	55.3	Q
3	Louis Lundgren	Denmark	56.0	
—	Pierre Arnaudin	France	DNF	

==== Quarterfinal 3 ====
Rank	Athlete	Nation	Time	Notes
1	Géo André	France	56.0	Q
2	Henri Thorsen	Denmark	57.2	Q
3	Ioannis Talianos	Greece	58.0	

==== Quarterfinal 4 ====
Rank	Athlete	Nation	Time	Notes
1	Roger Viel	France	57.2	Q
2	Martti Jukola	Finland	57.7	Q
3	Wilfrid Tatham	Great Britain	58.5	

==== Quarterfinal 5 ====
Rank	Athlete	Nation	Time	Notes
1	Morgan Taylor	United States	55.8	Q
2	Frederick Blackett	Great Britain	56.9	Q
3	Enrique Thompson	Argentina	57.0	
4	Richard Honner	Australia	58.5	
5	André Fouache	France	60.0	

==== Quarterfinal 6 ====
Rank	Athlete	Nation	Time	Notes
1	Ivan Riley	United States	55.4	Q
2	Luigi Facelli	Italy	56.4	Q
3	Jules Migeot	Belgium	56.7	
4	Warren Montabone	Canada	Unknown	
5	Oscar van Rappard	Netherlands	Unknown	

=== Semifinals ===
All semifinals were held on Sunday, July 6, 1924.

The best three finishers of each heat qualified for the final.

==== Semifinal 1 ====
Rank	Athlete	Nation	Time	Notes
1	Charles Brookins	United States	54.6	Q
2	Morgan Taylor	United States	54.9	Q
3	Erik Wilén	Finland	55.4	Q
4	Luigi Facelli	Italy	55.6	
5	Roger Viel	France	56.7	
6	Henri Thorsen	Denmark	57.3	

==== Semifinal 2 ====
Rank	Athlete	Nation	Time	Notes
1	Ivan Riley	United States	56.6	Q
2	Géo André	France	56.7	Q
3	Frederick Blackett	Great Britain	58.4	Q
4	Chan Coulter	United States	58.6	
5	Martti Jukola	Finland	58.6	
6	Humberto Lara	Chile	59.0	

=== Final ===
The final was held on Monday, July 7, 1924.

Frederick Blackett was disqualified for two false starts. After the race, Morgan Taylor's time was rejected as a world record because he knocked over a hurdle, which was against the rules in force at that time, while Charles Brookins, who had crossed the finish line in second, was disqualified for running out of his lane. As such, Erik Wilén was credited with an Olympic record, but his time was not ratified as world record.

Rank	Athlete	Nation	Time	Notes
1st place, gold medalist(s)	Morgan Taylor	United States	52.6	OR
2nd place, silver medalist(s)	Erik Wilén	Finland	53.8	
3rd place, bronze medalist(s)	Ivan Riley	United States	54.2	
4	Géo André	France	56.2	
—	Charles Brookins	United States	DSQ	
—	Frederick Blackett	Great Britain	DSQ	

== Results summary ==
Rank	Athlete	Nation	Quarterfinals	Semifinals	Final	Notes
1st place, gold medalist(s)	Morgan Taylor	United States	55.8	54.9	52.6	OR
2nd place, silver medalist(s)	Erik Wilén	Finland	55.3	55.4	53.8	
3rd place, bronze medalist(s)	Ivan Riley	United States	55.4	56.6	54.2	
4	Géo André	France	56.0	56.7	56.2	
5	Charles Brookins	United States	54.8	54.6	DSQ	
5	Frederick Blackett	Great Britain	56.9	58.4	DSQ	
7	Luigi Facelli	Italy	56.4	55.6	Did not advance	
8	Roger Viel	France	57.2	56.7	Did not advance	
9	Henri Thorsen	Denmark	57.2	57.3	Did not advance	
10	Chan Coulter	United States	55.0	58.6	Did not advance	
11	Martti Jukola	Finland	57.7	58.6	Did not advance	
12	Humberto Lara	Chile	56.5	59.0	Did not advance	
13	Louis Lundgren	Denmark	56.0	Did not advance		
14	Jules Migeot	Belgium	56.7	Did not advance		
15	Philip MacDonald	Canada	56.8	Did not advance		
16	Enrique Thompson	Argentina	57.0	Did not advance		
17	Ioannis Talianos	Greece	58.0	Did not advance		
18	Richard Honner	Australia	58.5	Did not advance		
18	Wilfrid Tatham	Great Britain	58.5	Did not advance		
20	André Fouache	France	1:00.0	Did not advance		
21	Warren Montabone	Canada	Unknown	Did not advance		
22	Oscar van Rappard	Netherlands	Unknown	Did not advance		
23	Pierre Arnaudin	France	DNF	Did not advance		
