= Swinnen =

Swinnen is a surname. Notable people with the surname include:

- Firmin Swinnen (1885–1972), Belgian theater organist and concert artist
- Johan Swinnen (diplomat) (born 1947), Belgian diplomat
- Johan Swinnen (born 1962), Belgian economist
- Marcel Swinnen (born 1909) Belgian hurdler
- Sven Swinnen (born 1974), Belgian football manager
- Tibeau Swinnen (born 1995), Belgian footballer

== See also ==
- Swinney
