= Frederick Blackett =

British hurdler (1900–1979)

Fred Blackett
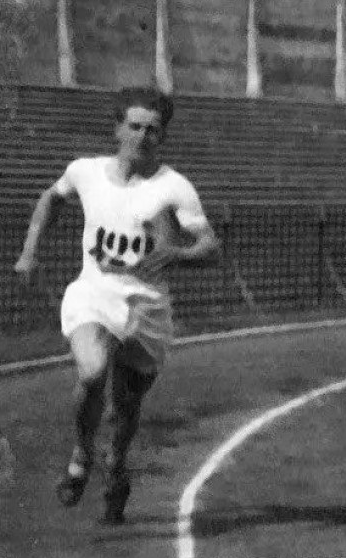

Personal information
- Nationality: British (English)
- Born: 17 January 1900 Bethnal Green
- Died: 17 May 1979 (aged 79) London Borough of Enfield

Sport
- Sport: Athletics
- Event: 400 metres hurdles
- Club: Surrey AC

Frederick Joseph Blackett (17 January 1900 – 17 May 1979) was a British hurdler who competed at the 1924 Summer Olympics.

== Career ==
Blackett finished second behind Wilfrid Tatham in the 440 yards hurdles event at the 1924 AAA Championships. Shortly afterwards he was selected for the British team at the 1924 Olympic Games in Paris and reached the final of the 400 metres hurdles event but was disqualified for two false starts.

The following year Blackett finished third behind Ivan Riley in the 440 yards hurdles event at the 1925 AAA Championships.
