= Jukola (disambiguation) =

The Jukola relay is an annual orienteering relay race held in Finland.

Jukola may also refer to:

- Jukola, a (fictional) manor where The Seven Brothers lived
- Martti Jukola (1900–1952), Finnish sports journalist and athlete
- Jukola Boardinghouse, former boarding house in Virginia, Minnesota, United States
