= Philip MacDonald (disambiguation) =

Philip MacDonald is an author.

Philip MacDonald may also refer to:

- Philip MacDonald, character in Adam's Woman
- Philip MacDonald (athlete) (1904–1978), Canadian athlete

== See also ==
- Philip McDonald (disambiguation)
