= Learmonth =

Learmonth may refer to:

== People ==
- George Learmonth of Balcomie, Scottish landowner
- George Learmonth (1590s–1633), Scottish soldier in Russian service
- Ian Learmonth, former British police officer, retired 2014
- Ian Learmonth (financier), Australian financier, CEO of the government's Clean Energy Finance Corporation
- James Learmonth of Dairsie (died 1547), Scottish courtier and diplomat
- James Rögnvald Learmonth (1895–1967), Scottish surgeon
- John Learmonth of Dean, Lord Provost of Edinburgh 1831–33
- Michael Learmonth, fictional character from the BBC Scotland soap opera River City
- Noel Fulford Learmonth (1880–1970), Australian author, historian and naturalist
- Okill Massey Learmonth VC, MC (1894–1917), Canadian recipient of the Victoria Cross
- Thomas Learmonth, also known as Thomas the Rhymer (c.1220–c.1298), Scottish laird
- Thomas Livingstone Learmonth (1818–1903), early Australian settler in Ballarat, Victoria
- Tom Livingstone-Learmonth (1906-1931), British hurdler

== Places ==
- Learmonth, Victoria, Australia
- RAAF Learmonth, Royal Australian Air Force base in Western Australia

== See also ==
- Clan Lamont (spelled many ways, including Learmonth)
- Learmonth, noble family of Scottish origin.
- Mikhail Lermontov (1814 – 1841), a Russian Romantic writer, poet and painter; descendant of George-Yuri Andreevich Learmonth
