= Thomas Learmonth =

Thomas Learmonth may refer to:

- Thomas the Rhymer (c.1220–c. 1298), 13th-century Scottish laird
- Thomas Livingstone Learmonth (1818–1903), Victorian colonist and namesake of the town of Learmonth
