= Learmont =

Learmont is a surname.

== List of people with the surname ==
- John Learmont (born 1934), former British Army officer
- Joseph Learmont, Scottish army officer
- Lei Learmont, American politician
- Thomas Learmont (1220–1298), Scottish laird

== See also ==
- Learmonth
- Learmont Drysdale
