= Kjellström =

Kjellström is a Swedish surname. Notable people with the surname include:

- Björn Kjellström (1910–1995), Swedish orienteer
- Erik Kjellström (1904–1956), Swedish hurdler
- Jan Kjellström (1940–1967), Swedish orienteer
