= André Fouache =

French hurdler

Personal information
- Full name: André Maurice Fouache
- Nationality: French
- Born: 20 October 1892
- Died: 1 September 1982 (aged 89)

Sport
- Sport: Track and field
- Event: 400 metres hurdles

André Maurice Fouache (20 October 1892 – 1 September 1982) was a French hurdler. He competed in the men's 400 metres hurdles at the 1924 Summer Olympics.
