= Chan Coulter =

American hurdler (1901–1991)

Chan Frank Coulter (September 24, 1901 – August 22, 1991) was an American track and field athlete who competed in the 1924 Summer Olympics. He was born in Johnson County, Iowa and died in Iowa City. In 1924 he was eliminated in the semi-finals of the 400 metre hurdles event.

Brother Coulter was involved with the Phi Gamma Delta for over 60 years, volunteering his support and service. In 1978 an International Fraternity award was created in his honor, the Chan F. Coulter Cup. The award is given annually to the graduate brother who has contributed the most to an undergraduate chapter through service in a capacity other than as a Purple Legionnaire or General Officer.

While living and working in Cleveland, Chan also served as coach to the Western Reserve University, now Case Western Reserve University, track team from 1930 - 1940.

During his junior year of college competing for the Iowa Hawkeyes track and field team, he was a hurdler on the 1924 U.S. Olympic track team. Following graduation, he worked in the insurance business many years before he began farming, which he continued until his retirement in 1963. He served as House Corporation Treasurer at Mu Deuteron ( U. of Iowa) from 1953 to 1958 and then again from 1960 to 1967. He later served as Section Chief and as Purple Legionnaire of Mu Deuteron on two occasions. Following his retirement, he did volunteer work for the American Legion, Veterans Hospital, and Farm Bureau.
