= Édouard Max-Robert =

French hurdler (1905–1996)

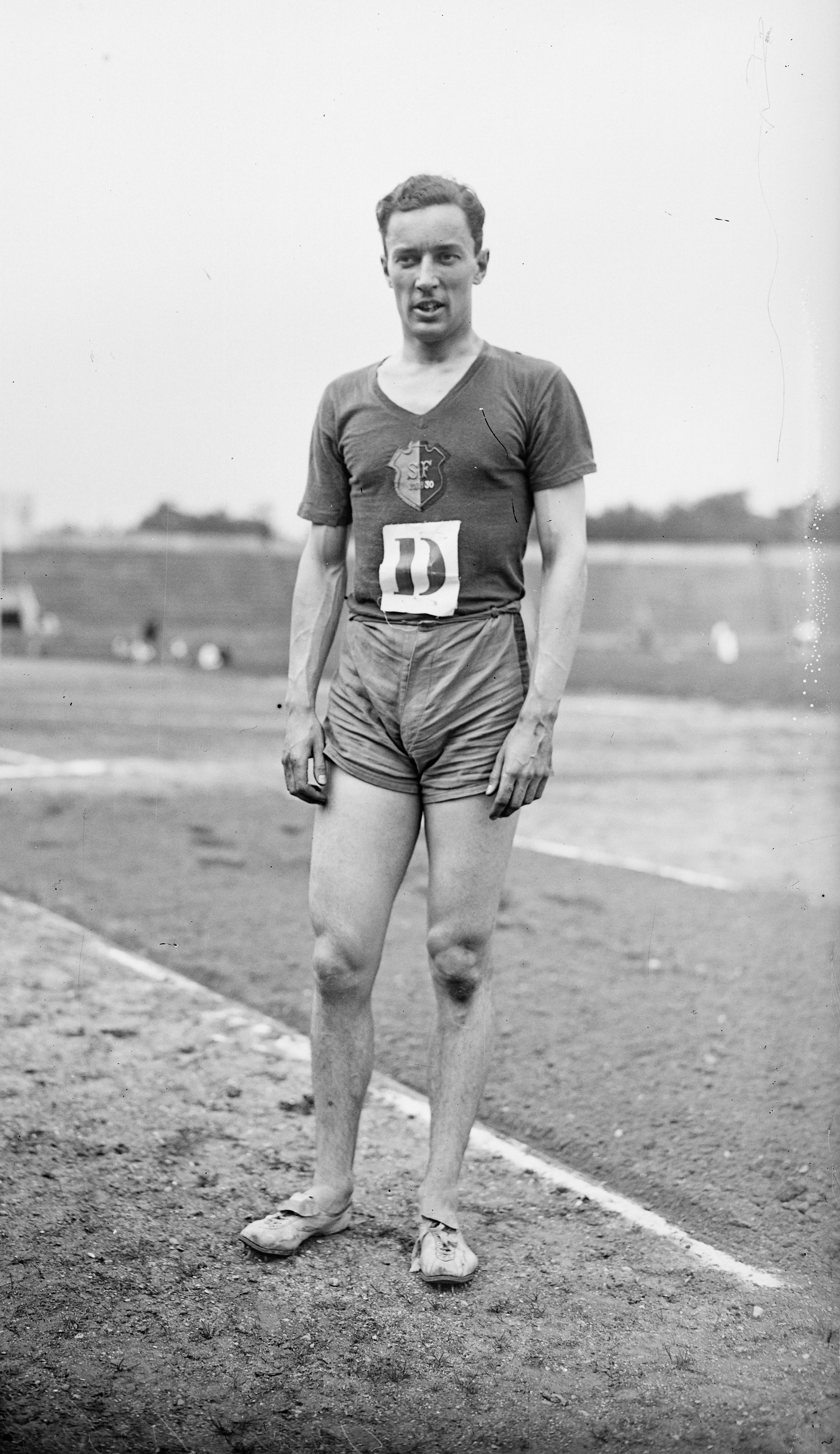
- Max-Robert in 1931

Personal information
- Nationality: French
- Born: 5 July 1905 Paris, France
- Died: 16 July 1996 (aged 91)

Sport
- Sport: Track and field
- Event: 400 metres hurdles

Édouard Max-Robert (5 July 1905 – 16 July 1996) was a French hurdler. He competed in the men's 400 metres hurdles at the 1928 Summer Olympics.
