= Lance Percival (athlete) =

British hurdler

Personal information
- Nationality: British (English)
- Born: 14 August 1906 Fulham, England
- Died: 1 September 1964 (aged 58) Moreton-in-Marsh, England

Sport
- Sport: Track and field
- Event: 400 metres hurdles
- Club: University of Oxford AC; Achilles Club

Lance Roger Percival (14 August 1906 – 1 September 1964) was a British hurdler who competed at the 1928 Summer Olympics.

== Biography ==
Percival was educated at Eton College and Trinity College, Oxford. He won his blue over 220 yards hurdles in 1928.

He competed in the men's 400 metres hurdles.
