= Frank Cuhel =

American hurdler (1904–1943)

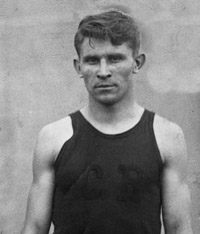

Personal information
- Born: September 18, 1904 Cedar Rapids, Iowa
- Died: February 22, 1943 (aged 38) Lisbon, Portugal

Sport
- Country: United States
- College team: Iowa
Medal record
Men's athletics
Representing the United States
Olympic Games
Silver medal – second place	1928 Amsterdam	400 metre hurdles

Frank Josef Cuhel (September 28, 1904 in Cedar Rapids, Iowa – February 22, 1943 in Lisbon, Portugal) was an American athlete who competed mainly in the 400 metre hurdles.

At his alma mater University of Iowa, Cuhel was a three-year letterman, playing football in addition to track. In 1928 he won the 220 yd hurdles at the NCAA championships, breaking the meeting record. He was elected to the U of I Athletic Hall of Fame in 1993.

He competed for the United States in the 1928 Summer Olympics held in Amsterdam, Netherlands in the 400 metre hurdles where he won the silver medal.

His success in the Olympics was such that upon graduation he took up work as a business envoy for a number of Dutch firms doing business in America. Eventually this business sent him to Java in Indonesia, which is where he found himself at the start of World War II.

As the islands became a more important strategic theater for World War II operations, Cuhel was hired by Mutual Broadcasting Systems to serve as a war correspondent, issuing radio reports of any action or newsworthy items. When Java fell to the Japanese, Cuhel and other correspondents made a daring last minute escape.

Cuhel was killed in the crash of the Boeing 314 called Yankee Clipper into the Tagus River on the outskirts of Lisbon, Portugal on February 22, 1943 (the same flight which badly injured Jane Froman and served as the climax to her biopic With A Song In My Heart). That December, a freighter was christened the Frank J. Cuhel in his honor.

== Sources ==
- Bliss, Edward (1991). Now The News: The Story of Broadcast Journalism. New York: Columbia University Press. ISBN 978-0-231-04402-8. OCLC 22731482.
- Blower, Brooke L. (2023). Americans in a World at War: Intimate Histories from the Crash of Pan Am's Yankee Clipper (Hardcover). Oxford: Oxford University Press. ISBN 9780199322008.
