= Philip McDonald =

Philip McDonald may refer to:

- Phil McDonald (1946-2026), English audio engineer
- Phil McDonald, a political candidate who stood thrice in Buller (New Zealand electorate)
- Philip McDonald, character in The Angelic Conversation (film)
- Phillip McDonald (born 1989), basketball player

== See also ==
- Philip MacDonald (disambiguation)
