= Frederick Chauncy =

British hurdler

Personal information
- Nationality: British
- Born: 22 December 1904
- Died: 4 June 1986 (aged 81)

Sport
- Sport: Track and field
- Event: 400 metres hurdles

Frederick Chauncy (22 December 1904 – 4 June 1986) was a British hurdler. He competed in the men's 400 metres hurdles at the 1928 Summer Olympics.
