= Kálmán Egri =

Hungarian discus thrower

Personal information
- Nationality: Hungarian
- Born: 25 November 1902 Hódmezővásárhely, Csongrád, Hungary
- Died: 8 September 1968 (aged 65) Budapest, Hungary
- Height: 196 cm (6 ft 5 in)
- Weight: 102 kg (225 lb)

Sport
- Sport: Athletics
- Event: Discus throw
- Club: MAC, Budapest

Kálmán Egri (25 November 1902 – 8 September 1968) was a Hungarian athlete who competed at the 1928 Summer Olympics.

== Career ==
Egri finished third behind Herb Schwarze in the shot put event and second behind Patrick Bermingham in the discus throw at the 1925 AAA Championships. Two years later he finished second behind Koloman Marvalits in the discus event at the 1927 AAA Championships.

Egri competed in the men's discus throw at the 1928 Olympic Games.
