= 1925 AAA Championships =

Outdoor track and field competition

- Dates: 17–18 July 1925
- Host city: London, England
- Venue: Stamford Bridge
- Level: Senior
- Type: Outdoor
- Events: 21

The 1925 AAA Championships was the 1925 edition of the annual outdoor track and field competition organised by the Amateur Athletic Association (AAA). It was held from 17 to 18 July 1925 at Stamford Bridge in London, England.

The Championships consisted of 21 events and covered two days of competition. The competition included the introduction of the marathon, which was held from Windsor to Stamford Bridge on 30 May.

== Results ==
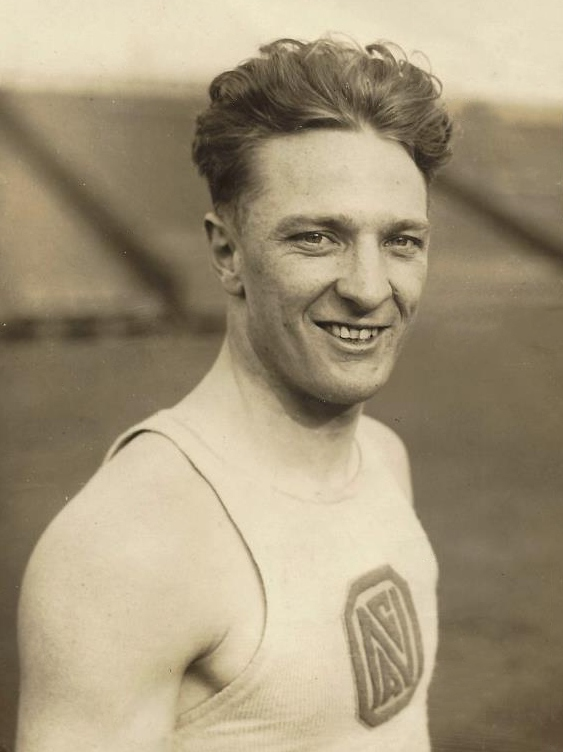
Loren Murchison won both the 110 and 220 yards

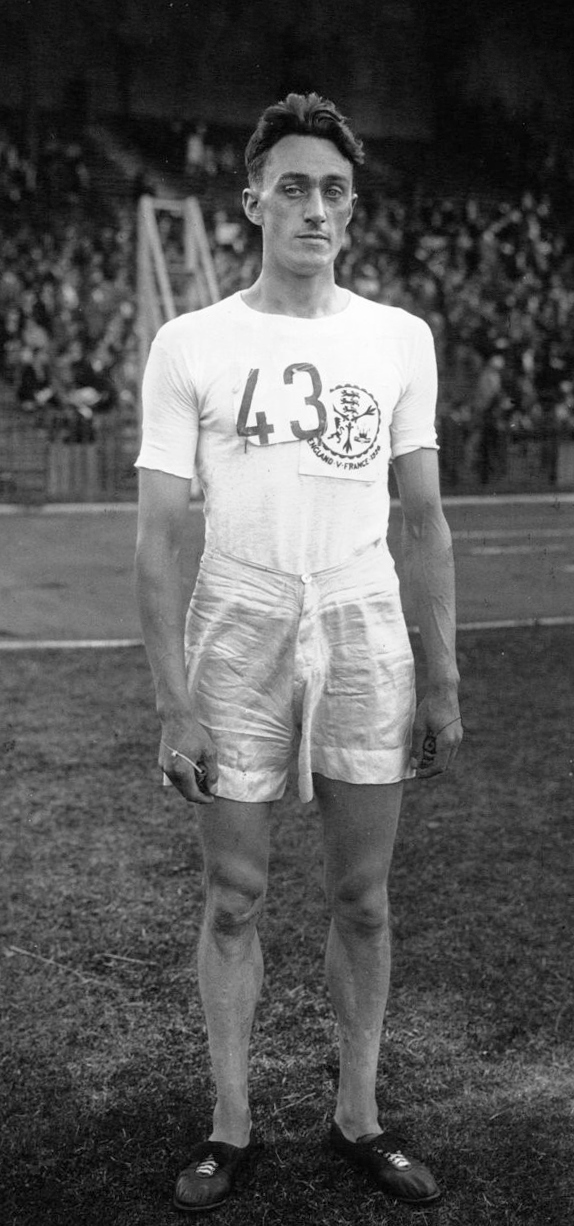
Fred Gaby won the hurdles again

Event	Gold		Silver		Bronze	
100 yards	(United States) Loren Murchison	9.9	(Haiti) Valéry Théard	½ yd	Walter Rangeley	inches
220 yards	(United States) Loren Murchison	21.6	John Rinkel	3 yd	(United States) Harry Evans	1 yd
440 yards	Henry Stallard	50.0	Thomas Cushing	5-6 yd	Richard Ripley	1-7 yd
880 yards	(Wales) Cecil Griffiths	1:57.2	William Nelson	4 yd	(United States) Ray Dodge	1-2 yd
1 mile	Bertram Macdonald	4:18.0	Cyril Ellis	1½ yd	(Scotland) Robert McAlpine-Downie	10-15 yd
4 miles	Joe Blewitt	19:54.6	Arthur Muggridge	19:56.6	Halland Britton	19:56.8
10 miles	Jack Webster	52:32.6	Ernest Harper	53:04.6	Halland Britton	53:10.6
marathon	(Northern Ireland) Sam Ferris	2:35:58.2 NR	(United States) Frank Zuna	2:38:27.4	(Scotland) Dunky Wright	2:42:28.4
steeplechase	Jack Webster	11:01.4	Evelyn Montague	11:17.8	A. J. Smith	11:33.0
120y hurdles	Frederick Gaby	15.2 =NR	(United States) Ivan Riley	1 yd	S. James Murphy	2 yd
440y hurdles	(United States) Ivan Riley	57.8	William Boardman	10 yd	Frederick Blackett	dnf
2 miles walk	Reg Goodwin	14:07.4	Wilf Cowley	14:21.8	C. W. Cater	14:32.2
7 miles walk	Gordon Watts	52:53.8	Wilf Cowley	54:08.0	Fred Clark	54:39.8
high jump	(United States) Harold Osborn	1.930	(France) Pierre Lewden	1.905	Fred Nuttall	1.803
pole jump	(United States) Paul Jones	3.50	(United States) Charles Greening	3.50	(United States) Franklin Kelley	3.50
long jump	(Australia) Richard Honner	7.30	(South Africa) Christiaan Steyn	7.17	(United States) Paul Jones	7.15
triple jump	(Hungary) Elemér Somfay	14.29	(United States) Harold Osborn	14.26	J. Connor	13.83
shot put	(United States) Herb Schwarze	14.40	(France) Raoul Paoli	14.07	(Hungary) Kálmán Egri	12.49
discus throw	(Republic of Ireland) Paddy Bermingham	41.24	(Hungary) Kálmán Egri	40.97	(Hungary) Elemér Somfay	39.20
hammer throw	Malcolm Nokes	46.04	(Scotland) John Jackson	38.42	John Freeborn	36.67
javelin throw	(Hungary) Béla Szepes	53.92	(Poland) Julian Gruner	51.09	(Poland) Sławosz Szydłowski	49.48

== See also ==
- 1925 WAAA Championships
