= Herman Larsen =

Danish hurdler

Personal information
- Nationality: Danish
- Born: 18 July 1899
- Died: 3 March 1962 (aged 62)

Sport
- Sport: Track and field
- Event: 400 metres hurdles

Herman Larsen (18 July 1899 – 3 March 1962) was a Danish hurdler. He competed in the men's 400 metres hurdles at the 1928 Summer Olympics.
