= Charles Brookins =

American hurdler

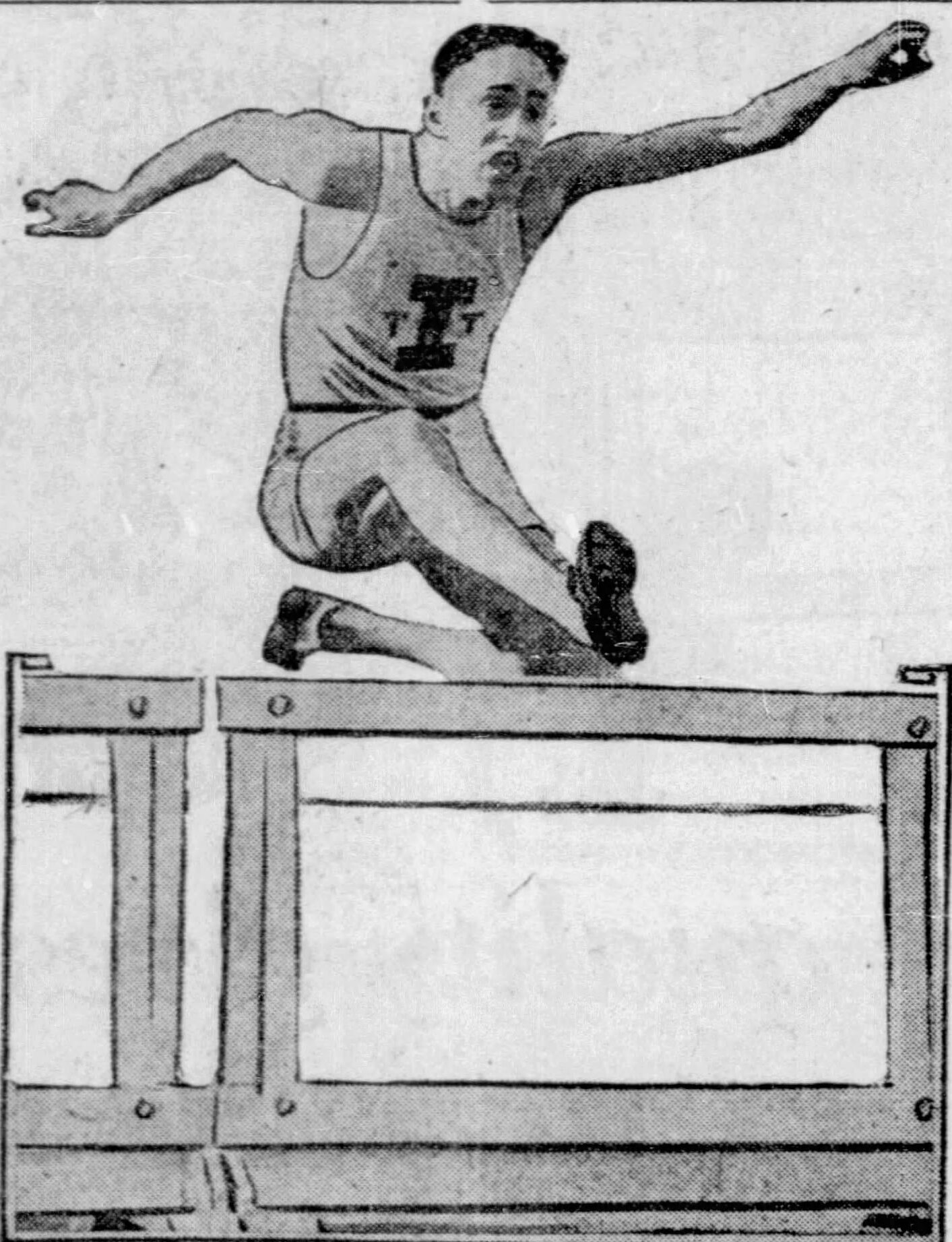
Charles R. Brookins in 1923

Charles Robert Brookins (September 17, 1899 – August 15, 1960) was an American track and field athlete who competed in the 1924 Summer Olympics.

== Early life and education ==
Brookins was born in Oskaloosa, Iowa on September 17, 1899. He attended the University of Iowa and ran track in college.

== Athletics career ==
In 1923 and 1925, Brookins won the 220 yard low hurdles at the USA Outdoor Track and Field Championships. Brookins twice set the world record in the 220 yard low hurdles, first with a time of 23.2 on June 2, 1923 and then with a time of 23.0 seconds on May 17, 1924.

Brookins was a member of the US 1924 Olympic Team. The 200 metre hurdles was not an event at the Paris Olympics. As a result, Brookins competed in the 400 metre hurdles final. He was finished second in this race but later disqualified for running out of his lane.

== Later career ==
Brookings became an assistant coach at the University of Iowa. He later became an salesman.

== Personal life and death ==
Brookins died on August 15, 1960 in Des Moines, Iowa at Iowa Methodist Hospital. He was 60.
