= Swinney =

Swinney may refer to:

== People ==
- Dabo Swinney (born 1969), the head coach of the Clemson University Tigers football team
- David Swinney (1946–2006), prominent psycholinguist
- Harry Swinney (1939–2026), American physicist noted for his contributions to the field of nonlinear dynamics
- John Swinney (born 1964), Scottish politician
- Pat Swinney Kaufman (born 1950), executive director of the New York State Governor's Office for Motion Picture and Television Development
- Youell Swinney (1917–1994), the only major suspect in the Phantom Killer case in Texarkana, Texas and Texarkana, Arkansas in 1946

== Places ==
- Swinney Recreation Center, University of Missouri-Kansas City
- Swinney Switch, Texas, an unincorporated community also known as Swinney

== See also ==
- Gollub-Swinney circular Couette experiment helped establish the Ruelle-Takens scenario for turbulence
