= Humberto Lara =

Chilean hurdler (1900–1957)

Personal information
- Born: 12 October 1900 Concepción, Chile
- Died: 23 March 1957 (aged 56)

Sport
- Sport: Track and field
- Event: 400 metres hurdles

Humberto Lara (12 October 1900 – 23 March 1957) was a Chilean hurdler. He competed in the men's 400 metres hurdles at the 1924 Summer Olympics.
