= Robert Maxwell (hurdler) =

American hurdler (1902–1985)

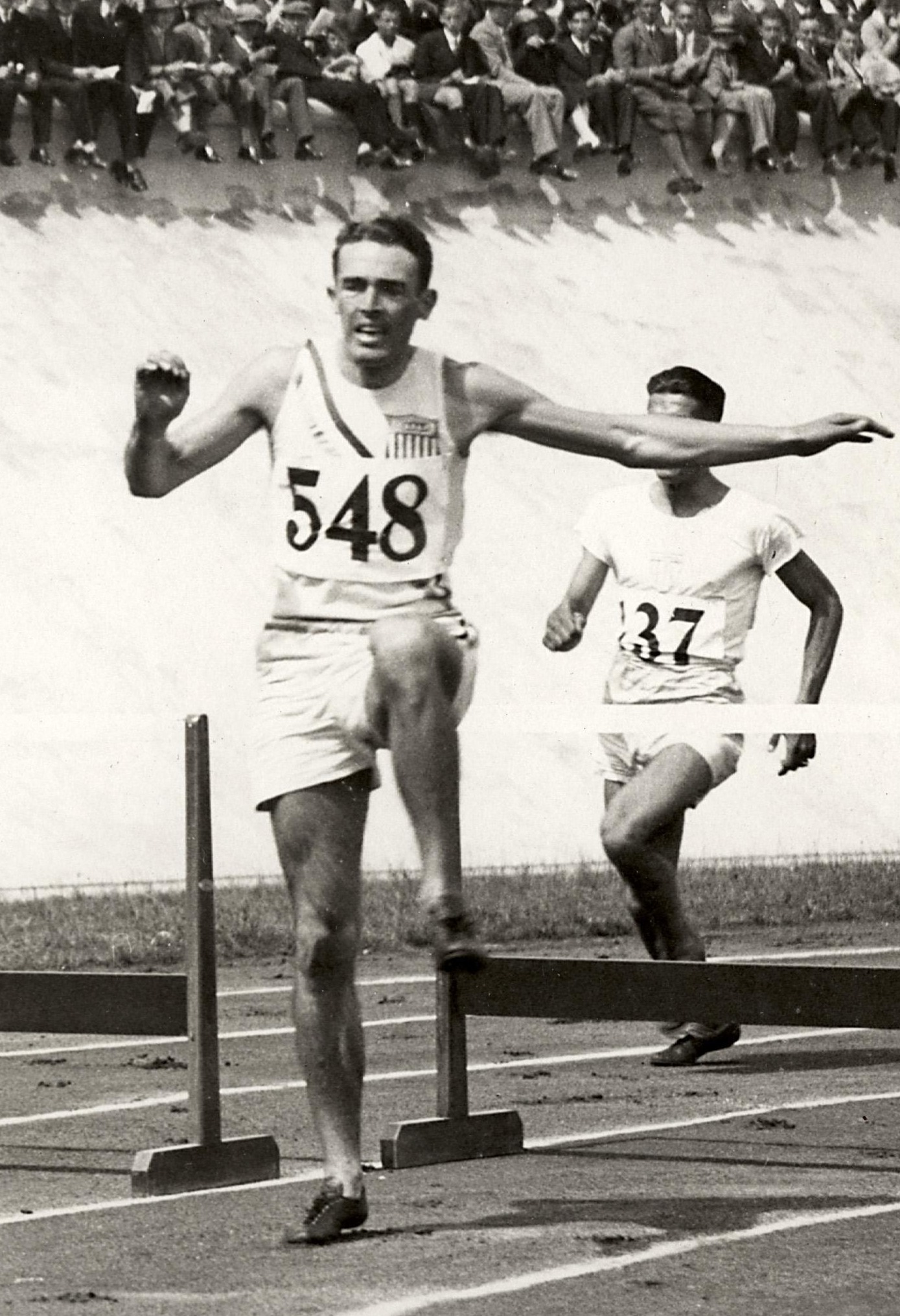
- Maxwell at the 1928 Olympics

Personal information
- Full name: James Robert Maxwell
- Born: June 9, 1902
- Died: August 15, 1985 (aged 83) Riverside, California, U.S.
- Height: 1.83 m (6 ft 0 in)
- Weight: 81 kg (179 lb)

Sport
- Sport: Athletics
- Club: LAAC, Los Angeles

James Robert Maxwell (June 9, 1902 – August 15, 1985) was an American runner. He competed at the 1928 Olympics in the 400 m hurdles, but failed to reach the final. As a student of Pomona College he won the AAU 220 yard hurdles title in 1927 and 1930–1931.
