= Richard Honner =

Australian surgeon and athlete

Personal information
- Nationality: Australian
- Born: 30 November 1897 Maitland, South Australia
- Died: 10 November 1962 (aged 64) Woollahra, New South Wales

Sport
- Sport: Sprinting
- Event: 400 metres/long jump
- Club: University of Sydney

Richard St John Honner (30 November 1897 – 10 November 1962) was an Australian surgeon, gynaecologist, obstetrician and an Olympic athlete. He competed in the men's 400 metres and the long jump at the 1924 Summer Olympics.

== Early life and athletics ==
Born in Maitland, South Australia his family moved when he was a child to Junee, New South Wales. Honner was educated at St Joseph's College, Hunters Hill. While studying medicine at the University of Sydney, Honner trained as a hurdler and long-jumper and was selected for the 1924 Paris Olympics. He finished in overall equal fourteenth place in the long jump and placed third in his heat in the 400m and did not progress. Before he left Australia he set an Australian long jump record which stood for 27 years. While conducting his medical post-graduate qualifications in England, Honner continued to compete in track and field. In 1925 he won the broad jump title at the British AAA Championships setting a Championship record of 7.30 at the 1925 AAA Championships. He successfully defended the title at the 1926 AAA Championships with a jump of 7.21.

== Medical career ==
Honner studied medicine at the University of Sydney, graduating in 1922 and taking up a residency at St Vincent's Hospital in 1922-23. Following the 1924 Olympics Honner ventured to the UK for medical residencies (the Middlesex Hospital 1924 and the Poplar and London Hospital 1925-27). He had completed his practitioner and surgery qualifications in England by 1925. In 1928 he was appointed honorary gynaecologist at Lewisham Hospital, and in 1931 surgeon and honorary obstetrician at St Margaret's Hospital. In 1936 he advanced to become a fellow of the Royal College of Surgeons Edinburgh, and in 1937 next year became a fellow of the Royal Australasian College of Surgeons.

== War service and personal ==
During WWII Honner was a major in the Australian Army Medical Corps. He served in military hospitals, in Goulburn and at Alice Springs, Northern Territory. He married Kathleen Mary Dooley in the chapel of St John's College, University of Sydney in 1928. In 1962 while addressing colleagues at a dinner at the Australia Hotel in Sydney he collapsed and died of a heart attack.
