= David Swinney =

David Swinney (April 21, 1946 – April 14, 2006) was a prominent psycholinguist. His research on language comprehension contributed to methodological advances in his field.

== Biography ==
Swinney received his BA in Psychology at Indiana University in 1968, his MA in Language Disorders, Speech Pathology and Audiology (1969), and his PhD in Psycholinguistics and Cognitive Psychology at the University of Texas at Austin (1974).

Swinney's faculty positions included: Tufts University (Department of Psychology), Rutgers University (Psychology and Cognitive Sciences Departments), the Graduate Center of the City University of New York (Programs in Linguistics, Psychology, Speech and Hearing Science) and University of California, San Diego (Chair, Department of Psychology).

== Contributions to the field of psycholinguistics ==
Cross-Modal Priming Task. The Cross-Modal Priming Task (CMPT), developed by David Swinney, is an online measure used to detect activation of lexical and syntactic information during sentence comprehension.

Prior to Swinney's introduction of this methodology, studies of lexical access were largely procured by offline measures, such as a phoneme-monitoring task. In these measures, study participants were asked to respond to a syntactic or lexical ambiguity in a sentence only after the entire sentence had been comprehended. Since Swinney considered the system of resolving ambiguities to be an autonomous, fast, and mandatory process, he suggested that the “downstream” temporal delay between stimulus and response could contaminate results. The CMPT, therefore, was created to probe lexical access in real time.

During this task, study participants heard recorded sentences containing lexical or syntactic ambiguities while seated in front of a computer screen. At the same moment when the ambiguous word or phrase was uttered, simultaneously a string of letters---either a word or a non-word---was flashed on the computer screen, and the participant was required to indicate whether it was a word or not, by pressing one of two buttons on a computer keyboard.

The uttered words had an ambiguous meaning or were an ambiguous phrase (for example: "mouse" - which could be understood as an animal or as a computer input device).

The words shown on the screen - when they were actual lexical words (and not non-words), could be related to one of the meanings of the uttered word or phrase (for example, on the screen the written word could be "animal", or "computer"), or the written word on the screen could be a control word or phrase, unrelated to the uttered word or phrase (for example, "sun").

Study participants were then asked to respond as quickly as possible once the probes were processed (i.e. once they understood them). The test assumed that multiple meanings are activated at the moment an ambiguity is encountered in a sentence, which primes related concepts. Swinney's anticipated quicker recognition of concepts, once related concepts were primed and thus activated, as opposed to words that had not been activated.

== Selected Research ==
"Lexical Access During Sentence Comprehension
(re) Consideration of Context Effects" David Swinney (1979)

This study utilized a CMPT, in order to investigate the process by which people resolve lexical ambiguity. Specifically, do people access all meanings of words at such moments, or only one meaning? Subjects listened to pre-recorded series of sentences that contained ambiguous words. These words were equibiased—meaning that there were two possible meanings of each ambiguous word and that one meaning was not favored over the other in common speech. The subjects were informed that they would be tested on their comprehension of these sentences.

For example, subjects were presented with the utterance: "Rumor had it that, for years, the government building had been plagued with problems. The man was not surprised when he found several bugs in the corner of the room." Here, the word "bugs" was determined to be ambiguous and equibiased towards the meaning of either "insects" on one hand, or "surveillance" on the other. At the moment of the utterance "… bugs" either "ANT" or "SPY" or an unrelated word such as "SEW" or non-word, were flashed on the screen. Study participants were asked to decide, as quickly as possible, whether the string of letters was a word or not.

Additionally, context conditions varied in that some had no biasing context, as above, or they strongly biased the listener towards one meaning or another. For example, "Rumor had it that, for years, the government building had been plagued with problems. The man was not surprised when he found several spiders, roaches and other bugs in the corner of the room."

Swinney claimed that if a person activates both meanings of an equibiased ambiguous word simultaneously, then the response times should be the same regardless of which meaning is primed by the stimulus. However, if one meaning or another is activated, then the response time should be quicker for the priming of that meaning.

Results indicated that listeners accessed multiple meanings for ambiguous words, even when faced with strong biasing contexts that indicated a single meaning. That is to say that regardless of whether "the man was not surprised when he found several bugs in the corner of the room" or "the man was not surprised when he found several spiders, roaches and other bugs in the corner of the room" was uttered, both SPY (contextually inappropriate to the second sentence) and ANT (contextually appropriate) appear to have been primed equally, whereas SEW and non-words were not.

"The Influence of Language Exposure on Lexical and Syntactic Language Processing" Tracy Love, Edwin Maas and David Swinney (2003)

In this study, Love, Maas and Swinney explored lexical access, using the CMPT, among three different categories of English proficient individuals: monolingual native English speakers (NINES), non-native English speakers (NNES) and bilingual native English speakers (BNES). Particularly, they were interested in how these different groups resolved non-canonical object-relative constructions that contained an ambiguous noun with a strong biasing context. For example, a prior experiment used the following sentence:

"The professor insisted that the exam be completed in ink, so Jimmy used the new pen (Probe Position1), that his mother-in-law recently (Probe Position2) purchased (Probe Position3) because the multiple colors allowed for more creativity."

This object-relative construction is considered non-canonical because the direct object "pen" occurs before its associated verb "purchased". Thus, it can be considered a "fronted direct object". The argument relies on the ambiguity of the word, "pen" which could mean either a writing instrument, or a jail cell. The Probe Positions 1, 2 and 3 indicated in the sentence above indicate the points at which the study participants were presented with a word on a computer screen, in a cross-modal decision task similar to the one described above. Moreover, the Probes represented either one ("pencil") or another interpretation ("jail") of the noun "pen" or were non-related controls ("jacket" or "tale") or a non-word of equivalent length.

After qualifying language pre-tests and completion of a self-report questionnaire about language proficiency, background, and age of second language acquisition, subjects were classified as either BNES or NNES. The non-English languages identified were of wide variety (e.g. Russian, Cantonese, Greek, Mandarin, Vietnamese, Spanish, Korean), and the researchers emphasize that most of the languages represented place less importance on word order than the English language. The study subjects participated in a CMPT that utilized object-relative sentences such as the one above, or a filler sentence of equivalent length and complexity. Response times were measured and compared.

Overall, all the English-proficient individuals tested activated both meanings of the ambiguous direct object as soon as it was presented, despite the strong biasing context. Then, in the NINES group, activation had dissipated 700 ms downstream (PP2), until the primary meaning was reactivated at Probe Position 3, after the verb. However, for the contextually appropriate interpretation, the non-NINES did not reactivate the fronted direct object in Probe Position 3. Researchers attributed this difference to the prior exposure of many in the non-NINES groups to languages that relied less explicitly on word order for comprehension.

"Lexical Processing and Sentence Comprehension in Aphasia" Edgar Zurif, David Swinney and Merrill Garrett (1990)

In this experiment, Zurif, Swinney and Garret built upon existing research on language processing errors in Broca's and Wernicke's aphasia patients. Prior studies indicate that, generally, Broca's aphasia patients demonstrate a slower-than-normal time course of lexical activation than controls; whereas, lexical activation is relatively unimpaired in Wernicke's aphasics. This study compared and contrasted selected patients’ capacities for resolving subject-relative constructions through a process known as gap filling. For example:

"The gymnast loved the professor* from the northern city who* (t)* complained about the bad coffee."

Since the displaced "who" is intended to modify "the professor" in this sentence, reactivation of antecedent "the professor" at "who" refers to the process of gap filling. Here, the gap between the subject noun phrase and relative pronoun is necessarily resolved through mental reordering of the sentence's structural elements.

Patients who had suffered Cerebrovascular Accidents—4 Wernicke's aphasiacs and 4 Broca's aphasiacs — were recruited from a Veteran's Administration hospital. The patients listened to pre-recorded subject-relative sentences over headphones and at either a pre-gap or post-gap position in a given sentence (indicated by the *) would hear a tone and see either a word or string of letters flashed onto a computer screen. Study participants were then asked to respond as quickly as possible by pressing either a "yes" or "no" button depending on whether the stimulus on the computer screen was an actual word or not. The words shown on the computer screen were either semantically relevant to "professor", in the case of the sentence above: "teacher", or a non-related control, "address". The time between stimulus and response was recorded for analysis.

Findings indicated that, in support of the hypothesis, the capacity and resources available to patients with Wernicke's aphasia to procure appropriate gap filling remain intact. Although this process appears to be preserved, the researchers point out that other related processes, such as higher-level sentence comprehension, might be impaired.

On the other hand, the gap filling process in Broca's patients was significantly impaired. Results showed that priming was not activated at any of the probe positions—signifying a poverty of resources available to these patients for real-time processing such subject-relative constructions. The researchers argue, based on these results, that neurological damage to the left anterior cortex implicates this region in resolving gap-filling operations during sentence comprehension.

== See also ==
- Garden path sentence
- List of linguistic example sentences
- Ambiguity
- Polysemy
- Modularity of Mind
- Language module
- Semantics
- Aphasia

== Bibliography ==
- Dr. David Swinney's Curriculum Vitae:
- Love, T. Maas, E. and Swinney, D. 2003. The influence of language exposure on lexical and syntactic language processing. Experimental Psychology, 50(3), pages 204–216
- Swinney, D. 1979. Lexical access during sentence comprehension: (Re) consideration of context effects. Journal of Verbal Learning and Verbal Behavior, 18, pages 645–659
- Zurif, E. Swinney, D. and Garrett, M. Lexical processing and sentence comprehension in aphasia. 1990. Caramazza, A. (Ed.) Cognitive Neuropsychology and Neurolinguistics: advances in models of cognitive function and impairment, Lawrence Erlbaum Associates, New York, pages 123–136
