= Marcel Swinnen =

Belgian hurdler

Personal information
- Nationality: Belgian
- Born: 4 February 1909

Sport
- Sport: Track and field
- Event: 400 metres hurdles

Marcel Swinnen (born 4 February 1909, date of death unknown) was a Belgian hurdler. He competed in the men's 400 metres hurdles at the 1928 Summer Olympics.
