= Jukola Boardinghouse =

- U.S. National Register of Historic Places
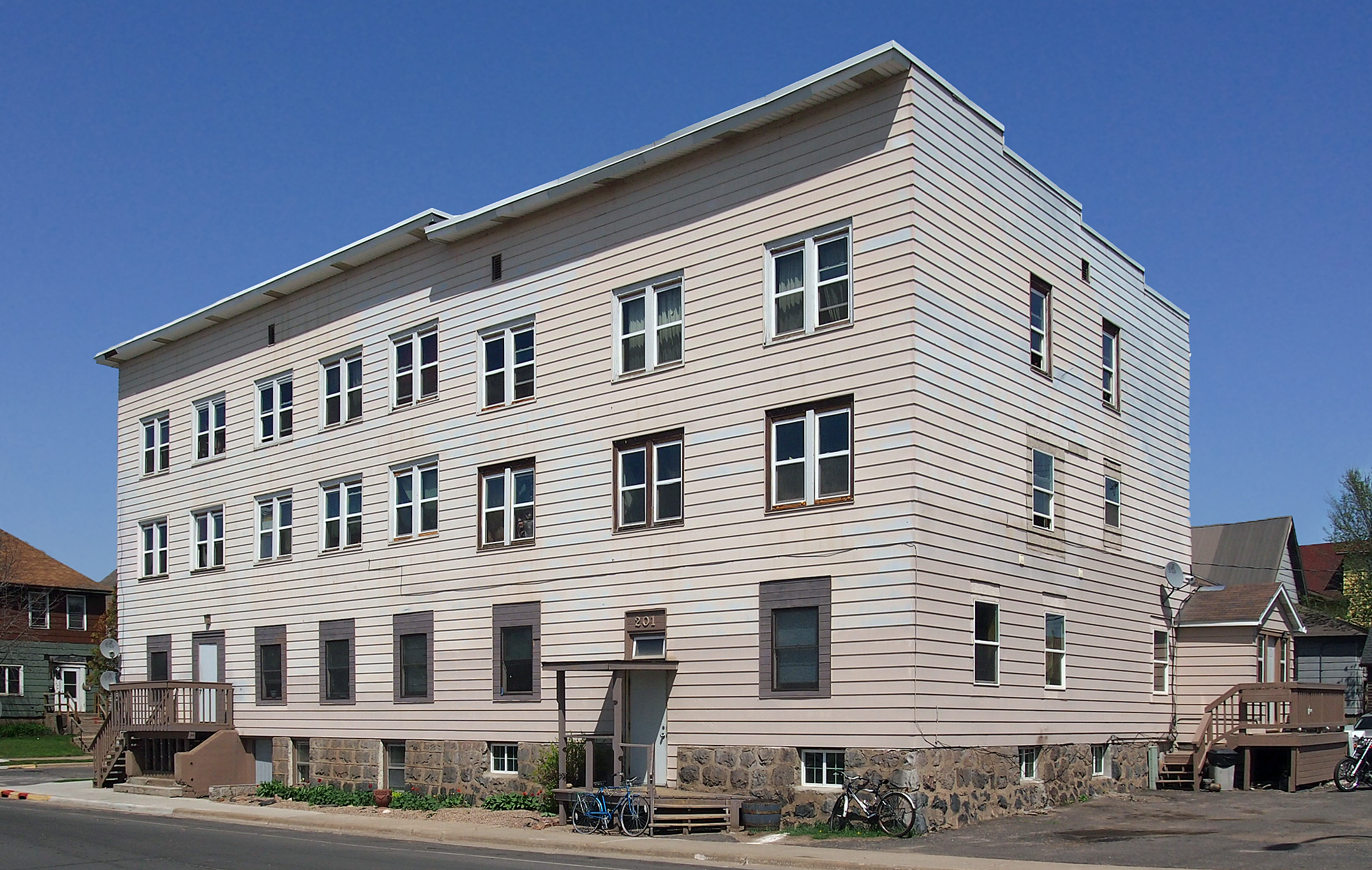
- The Jukola Boardinghouse from the southwest

- Location within Minnesota Location within the United States
- Location: 201 N. 3rd Avenue, Virginia, Minnesota
- Coordinates: 47°31′29″N 92°32′5″W
- Area: Less than one acre
- Built: 1912
- NRHP reference No.: 82004710
- Added to NRHP: March 10, 1982

The Jukola Boardinghouse is a former boarding house in Virginia, Minnesota, United States. It was built in 1912, one of many constructed as mining began in the Iron Range and thousands of unmarried men arrived to take work. The name Jukola is Finnish, as it was built for Finnish miners. In 1982 the Jukola Boardinghouse was listed on the National Register of Historic Places for its local significance in the themes of architecture, exploration/settlement, and social history. It was nominated as a well-preserved example of this once-common and essential lodging option in the early years of Iron Range mining.

== See also ==
- National Register of Historic Places listings in St. Louis County, Minnesota
