= Erik Wilén =

Finnish sprinter (1898–1982)

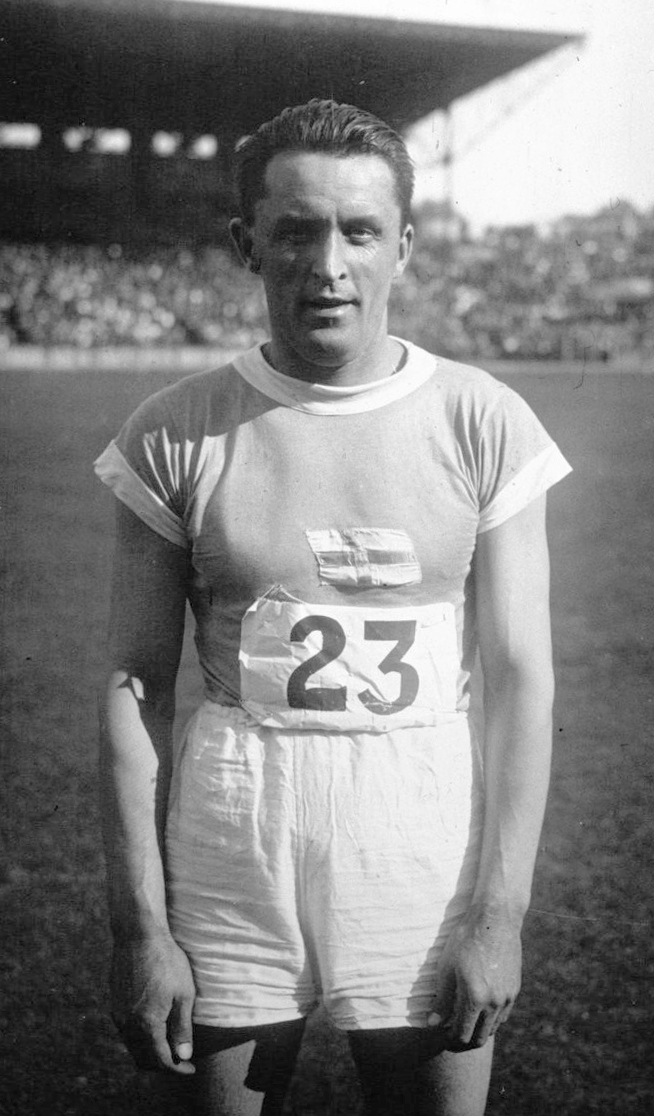
- Wilen in 1929

Personal information
- Born: 15 July 1898 Helsinki, Finland
- Died: 23 July 1982 (aged 84) Helsinki, Finland
- Height: 1.80 m (5 ft 11 in)
- Weight: 72–74 kg (159–163 lb)

Sport
- Sport: Athletics
- Event(s): 200–800 m, 400 m hurdles, triple jump
- Club: HIFK, Helsinki

Achievements and titles
- Personal best(s): 200 m – 22.6 (1919); 400 m – 49.0 (1923); 800 m – 1:57.0 (1921); 400 mH – 53.6e (1924); TJ – 13.59 m (1918)
Medal record
Representing Finland
Olympic Games
Silver medal – second place	1924 Paris	400 m hurdles

Erik Wilhelm "Erkka" Wilén (15 July 1898 – 23 July 1982) was a Finnish sprinter. He competed at the 1920, 1924 and 1928 Summer Olympics in the 400 m and 400 m hurdles events and won a silver medal in the 400 m hurdles in 1924. He failed to reach the finals in all his other events.
