= Wilfrid Tatham =

British hurdler

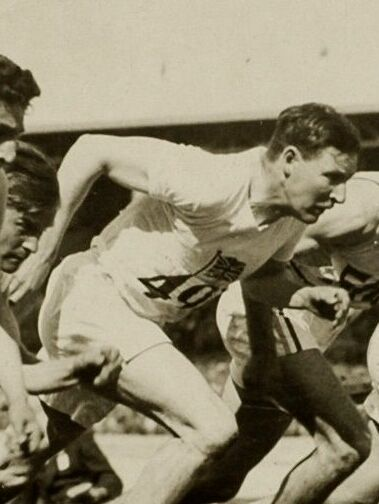
- Wilfrid Tatham in 1928

Personal information
- Nationality: British
- Born: 12 December 1898 Bromley, Kent, England
- Died: 26 July 1978 (aged 79) Jamestown, Saint Helena

Sport
- Sport: Track and field
- Event: 400 metres hurdles
- Club: University of Cambridge AC; Achilles Club

Wilfrid George Tatham (12 December 1898 – 26 July 1978) was a British hurdler, who competed at the 1924 Summer Olympics.

== Biography ==
Tatham, educated at Eton College and King's College, Cambridge, finished third behind Frenchman Armand Burtin in the 1 mile event at the 1920 AAA Championships.

Tatham became the national 440 yards hurdles champion after winning the British AAA Championships title at the 1924 AAA Championships. At the 1924 Olympic Games, Tatham competed in the men's 400 metres hurdles.

Tatham was fourth in the 440 yard hurdles at the 1930 British Empire Games. He was a schoolmaster at Eton College at the time of the 1930 Games.

Tatham received the Military Cross as a member of the Coldstream Guards. He was made an Officer of the Order of the British Empire.

== Archives ==
A collection of archival material related to Wilfrid Tatham can be found at the Cadbury Research Library, University of Birmingham
