= Vangelis Moiropoulos =

Greek sprinter (1905–1996)

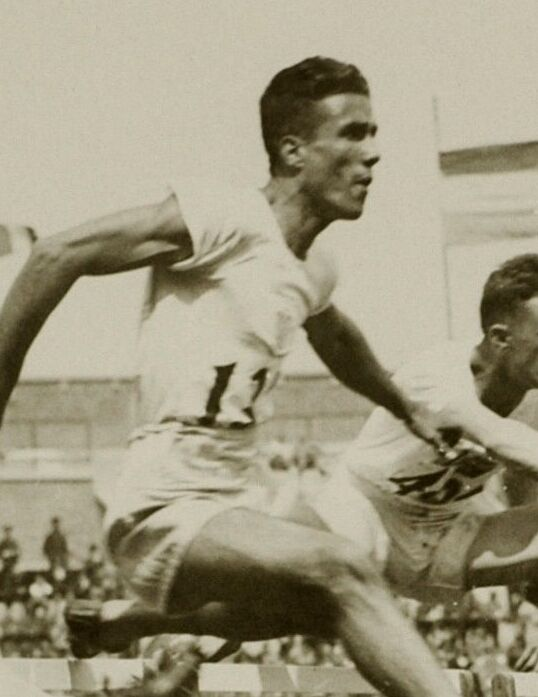
- Vaneglis Moiropoulos in 1928

Personal information
- Nationality: Greek
- Born: 25 March 1905 Geraki, Laconia
- Died: 12 October 1996 (aged 91)

Sport
- Sport: Sprinting
- Event: 4 × 100 metres relay

Vangelis Moiropoulos (25 March 1905 – 12 October 1996) was a Greek sprinter. He competed in the 4 × 100 metres relay at the 1928 Summer Olympics and the 1932 Summer Olympics.
