= Ivan Riley =

American hurdler

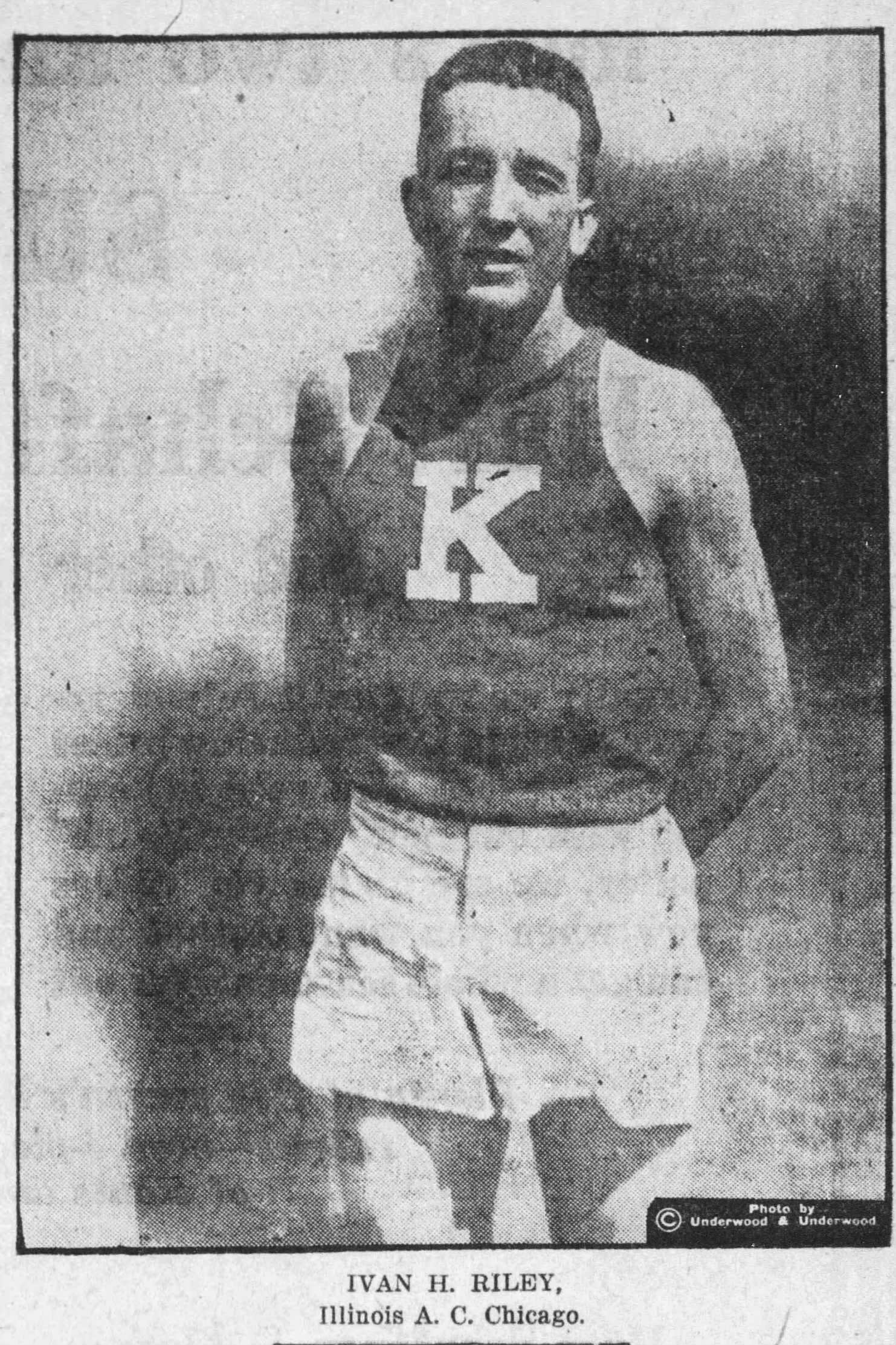
- Riley in 1924

Personal information
- Nationality: American
- Born: 31 December 1900 in Newton, Kansas, USA
- Died: 28 October 1943 (aged 42) Kansas City, Kansas, USA
- Height: 183 cm (6 ft 0 in)
- Weight: 74 kg (163 lb)

Sport
- Sport: Athletics
- Event: Hurdles
- Club: Illinois AC
Medal record
Men's athletics
Representing the United States
Bronze medal – third place	1924 Paris	400 metre hurdles

Ivan Harris Riley (December 31, 1900 – October 28, 1943) was an American athlete who competed mainly in the 400 metre hurdles who competed at the 1924 Summer Olympics.

== Career ==
Riley competed for the United States in the 1924 Summer Olympic Games held in Paris, France, in the 400 metre hurdles where he won the bronze medal.

The following year Riley won the British AAA Championships title in the 440 yards hurdles event at the 1925 AAA Championships. He also finished second behind Frederick Gaby in the 120 yards hurdles.

Riley ran for the Kansas State Wildcats track and field program where he won an NCAA title.
