= Philip MacDonald (athlete) =

Canadian hurdler

Personal information
- Born: 10 May 1904 Charlottetown, Prince Edward Island, Canada
- Died: 4 January 1978 (aged 73)

Sport
- Sport: Track and field
- Event: 400 metres hurdles

Philip MacDonald (10 May 1904 – 4 January 1978) was a Canadian hurdler. He competed in the men's 400 metres hurdles at the 1924 Summer Olympics.
