= Pierre Arnaudin =

French hurdler and rugby union player

Personal information
- Nationality: French
- Born: 13 June 1896
- Died: 14 December 1982 (aged 86)
- Height: 1.73 m (5 ft 8 in)

Sport
- Sport: Track and field, rugby union
- Event: 400 metres hurdles

Pierre Arnaudin (13 June 1896 – 14 December 1982) was a French rugby union player and hurdler. He competed in the 400 metres hurdles at the 1924 Summer Olympics and the 1928 Summer Olympics.

== Biography ==
Pierre Camille Paul Arnaudin was born on June 13, 1896, in Saint-Christoly-de-Blaye in the French department of Gironde.

Starting with the 1921–1922 season, he joined ASM Clermont Auvergne as both coach and captain. He later handed over the captaincy to Louis Puech, and his coaching position to Puech and Antoine Vazeille starting with the 1923–1924 season.

He competed in the 1924 Olympic Games in Paris but was eliminated in the qualifying round.
