= Thomas Livingstone Learmonth =

Australian politician

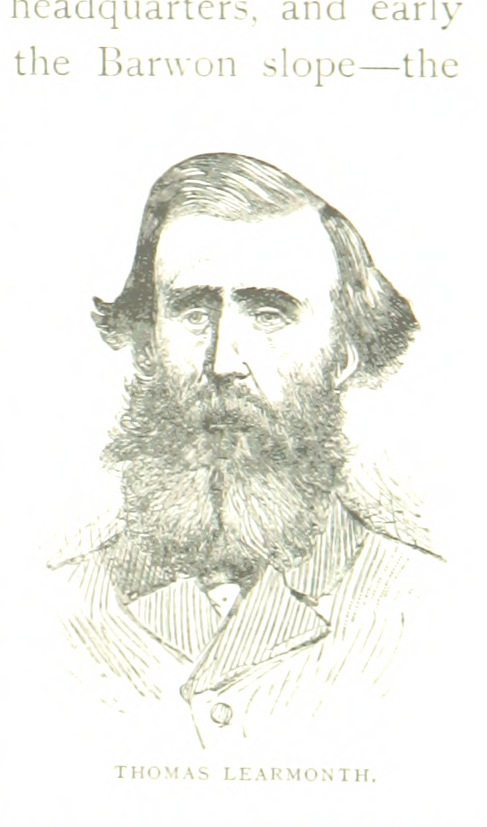
- An 1888 illustration of Learmonth
- Born: 2 May 1818; Calcutta, British India
- Died: 28 October 1903 (aged 85); Edinburgh, Scotland
- Spouses: Louisa Maria Burer Valiant (m. 1857–1878); Jane Florence Harriett Reid (m. 1879)
- Children: c. 10 or more
- Father: Thomas Learmonth
- Relatives: Somerville Learmonth (brother); Elizabeth, Lady Hope (granddaughter); Tom Livingstone-Learmonth (grandson); John Learmonth (uncle)

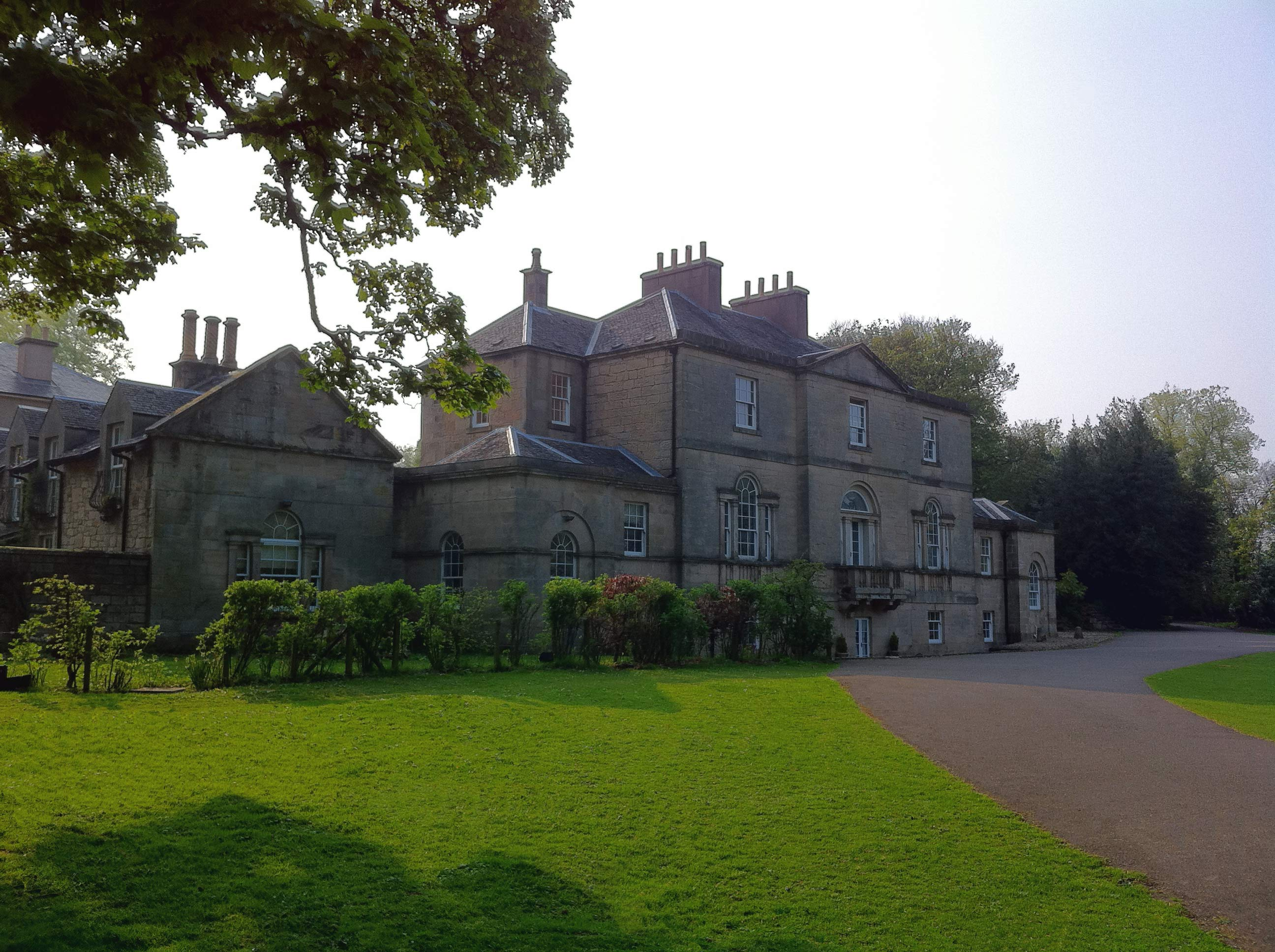
Parkhill House, Polmont

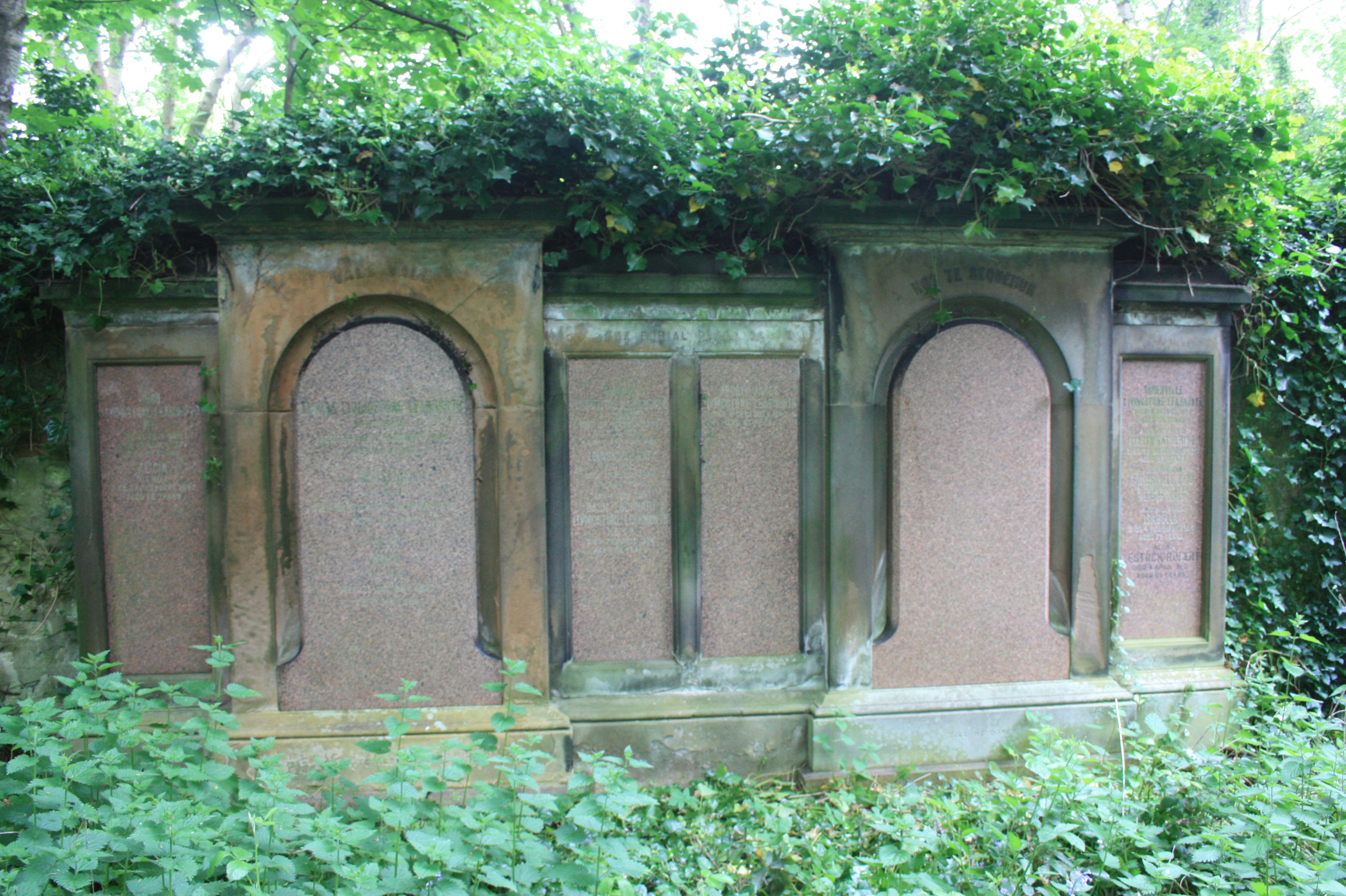
The grave of Thomas Livingstone Learmonth, Warriston Cemetery

Thomas Livingstone Learmonth of Parkhill (2 May 1818 – 28 October 1903) was an early settler of Australia, of Scots descent, who established himself as a squatter on land around Ballarat, then in the colony of New South Wales, in the 1830s.

== Life ==
He was born simply Thomas Learmonth, in Calcutta, Bengal Presidency, British India, on 2 May 1818, the son of Thomas Learmonth (1783-1869), and his wife, Christian Donald (1788-1843). His parents were both Scots. Thomas and his family arrived in Hobart, Tasmania on 20 October 1835 aboard the Perthshire, from Leith, Scotland. The family adopted the name Livingstone-Learmonth after Margaret Livingstone, an heiress living at Parkhill House in Polmont around 1825.

Having been attracted to the new settlement at Port Phillip, Learmonth started with a pioneering party from the shores of Corio Bay, in August 1837, to explore the unknown country to the northwest, directing their course, in the first instance, to Mount Buninyong, near to which, in conjunction with his brother, Somerville Livingstone Learmonth, Thomas Learmonth subsequently entered into pastoral pursuits on the fine country the party discovered further to the northwest. In the following year, the two brothers and some friends explored the course of the Loddon River, and reached a prominent peak which they called Ercildoun, after an old keep on the Scottish border associated with their ancestral history. The brothers established a second station there.

In 1853, Learmonth wrote a memoir of his early years on the land in Victoria that, together with other similar accounts, were later published.

In November 1859, Thomas Learmonth made a donation towards building a church in the town:

Thomas Learmonth, Esq., of Ercildoun, with his usual liberality has contributed £20 towards the erection of a Church of England place of worship at Lake Learmonth.

He was a member of the Victorian Legislative Council from March 1866 until September 1868.

After many years of prosperity, the brothers disposed of their Buninyong property, and subsequently sold the Ercildoune estate to Sir Samuel Wilson in about 1873.

Learmonth was for some time a member of the Upper House in Victoria, but left for England in 1868. He later lived at Parkhill House in Polmont near Falkirk, and was a Justice of the Peace for Stirlingshire.

He died on 28 October 1903 at his Edinburgh house at 28 Northumberland Street. He is buried with his siblings in Warriston Cemetery in north Edinburgh. The distinctive grave lies on the south wall of the main cemetery, backing onto the Water of Leith Walkway.

His grave notes that he was "a sinner saved".

== Family ==
He married, firstly, in 1857, Louisa Maria Burer Valiant (d.1878), daughter of Major-General Sir Thomas Valiant; and, secondly, in 1879, Jane Florence Harriette Reid, daughter of Lestock Robert Reid, of the Bombay Civil Service. Between his two wives, he had at least ten children.

His uncle, John Learmonth, was Lord Provost of Edinburgh.

His grandson, Tom Livingstone-Learmonth, competed as a hurdler at the 1928 Olympics.
