= Warren Montabone =

Canadian hurdler

Personal information
- Nationality: Canadian
- Born: 28 June 1903 Grand Rapids, Michigan, United States
- Died: 27 September 1999 (aged 96)

Sport
- Sport: Track and field
- Event: 110 metres hurdles

Warren Montabone (28 June 1903 – 27 September 1999) was a Canadian hurdler. He competed in the men's 110 metres hurdles at the 1924 Summer Olympics.
