= Martti Jukola =

Finnish sports journalist and athlete

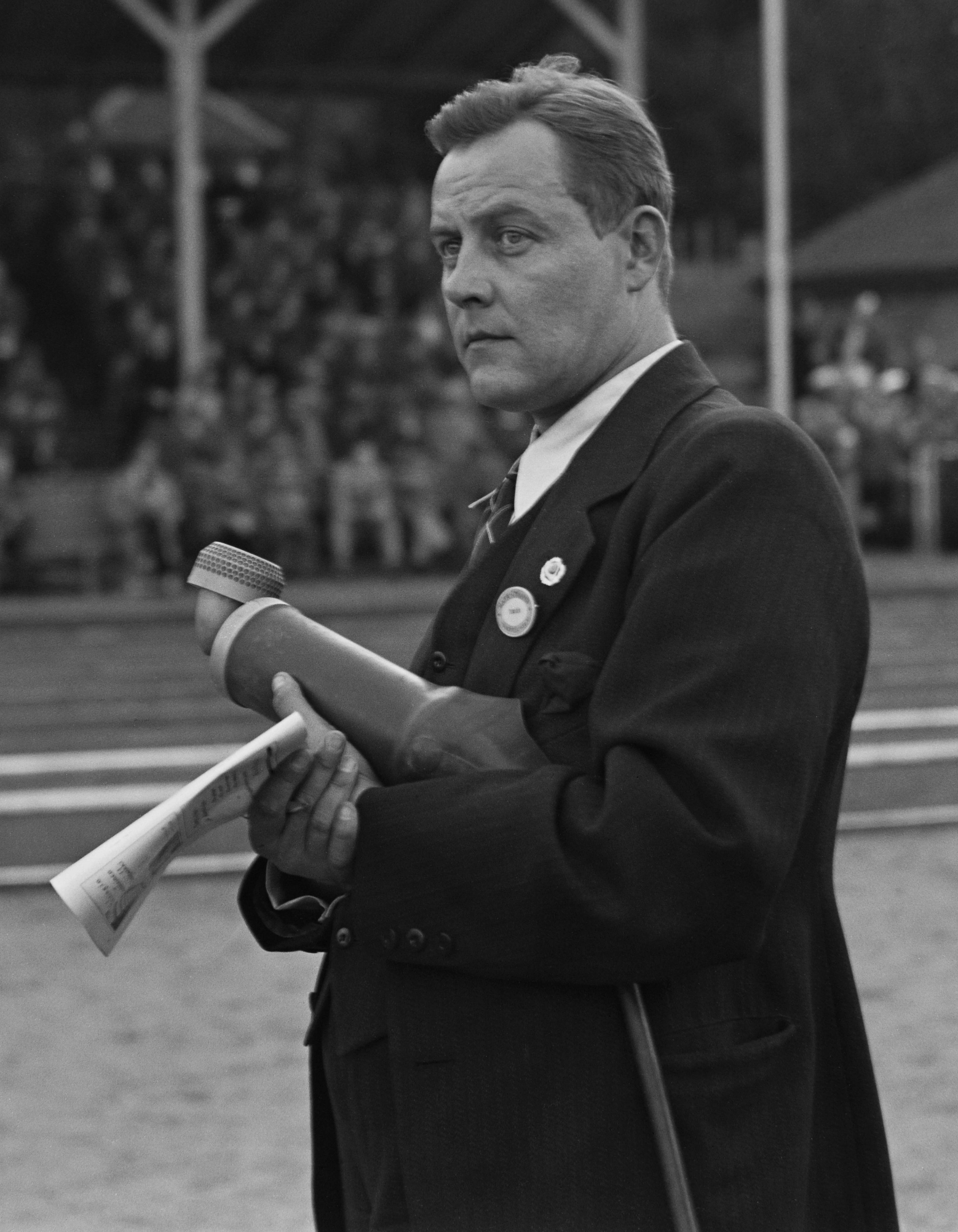
- Born: 22 October 1900; Turku, Finland
- Died: 3 October 1952 (aged 51); Helsinki, Finland
- Occupations: Sports journalist Athlete
- Known for: Popularizing on the field reporting in Finland

Martti Henrik Jukola (22 October 1900 – 3 October 1952) was a Finnish sports journalist and athlete. He was a pioneer in Finnish radio for his on the field reporting at sports events. Jukola was a hurdler and participated in the 1924 Summer Olympics.

== Early life and education ==
Martti Jukola was born in Turku in 1900. His parents were Aapo Henrik Jukola and Maria Wilhelmina Grönroos. In 1922, he graduated with his Bachelor of Arts and in 1932 received his PhD. The subject of his doctoral thesis was J. H. Erkko.

== Career ==
In 1922, he became assistant editor of Urheilulehti. He then became corresponding editor in chief in 1931. While working at Urheilulehti, he also served as literary officer of WSOY. He also published work in Kansan Kuvalehti and Urheilija. He started working for Yle in 1931 as a commentator. From 1939 until 1942 he was head of the sports department. He founded the Ylä-Vuoksen Palloseura.

As an athlete, the height of his track and field career was in the 1920s. His home sports club was Turun Urheiluliitto. He finished fifth in hurdling at the 1924 Summer Olympics in the semi-finals. He moved to Turku and was represented by Porvoon Urheilijat and Helsingin Kisa-Veikot. He was made an honorary member of the later.

== Later life ==
He died in 1952 in Helsinki.

== Works ==
- Olympialaiskisat I-III 1924–1928
- Olympialaispoikia 1928
- Juhana Heikki Erkko. Elämä ja teokset, osa I (väitöskirja) 1930 ja osa II 1939
- Me uskomme urheiluun 1932
- Athletics in Finland 1932
- Huippu-urheilun historiaa (useita painoksia) 1. 1935
- Laakeriseppele. Pyrähdyksiä kotimaassa ja maailmalla. Urheiluselostajan muistelmia 1943
- Urheilun pikku jättiläinen ohjekirja nuorille urheilijoille, tietokirja kaikille urheilunharrastajille (1945–1947, useita painoksia)
- Urheileva nuoriso 1948
- Suuri Olympiakirja 1952
