= Erik Kjellström =

Swedish hurdler

Personal information
- Nationality: Swedish
- Born: 18 December 1904
- Died: 7 November 1956 (aged 51)

Sport
- Sport: Track and field
- Event: 110 metres hurdles

Erik Kjellström (18 December 1904 – 7 November 1956) was a Swedish hurdler. He competed in the men's 110 metres hurdles at the 1928 Summer Olympics.
