= Tom Livingstone-Learmonth =

British hurdler (1906–1931)

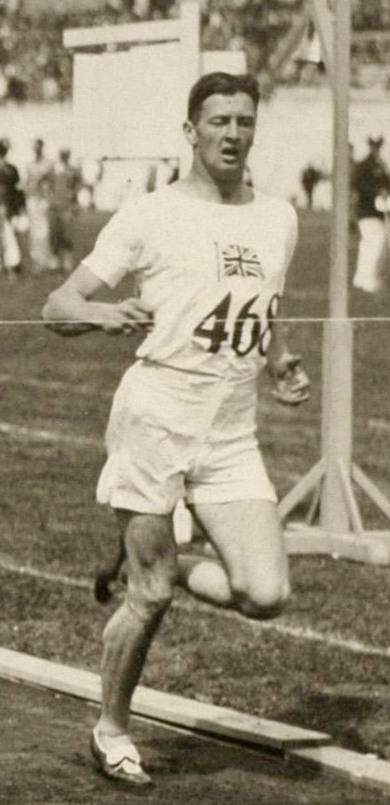
- Thomas Livingston-Learmonth at the 1928 Olympics

Personal information
- Nationality: British/Australian
- Born: 5 January 1906 Waratah, New South Wales, Australia
- Died: 24 April 1931 (aged 25) Khartoum, Sudan
- Height: 1.88 m (6 ft 2 in)
- Weight: 80 kg (180 lb)

Sport
- Sport: athletics
- Event: hurdles
- Club: University of Cambridge AC; Achilles Club

Thomas Carlisle Livingstone-Learmonth (5 January 1906 – 24 April 1931) was a British hurdler. He competed at the 1928 Olympics in the 400 metres hurdles and finished in fifth place.

== Biography ==
The career of Livingstone-Learmonth was overshadowed by Lord Burghley, who beat him in the 440 yd hurdles at all 1926–1928 AAA Championships. Earlier in 1925 Livingstone-Learmonth set a British record in the 220 yd hurdles, but Burghley had bettered it within three weeks. In the semifinals of the 1928 Olympics, Livingstone-Learmonth set another British record in the 400 m hurdles, at 54.0 s, but it was bettered the next day by Burghley in the final.

Livingstone-Learmonth finished second behind Burghley in the 440-yard hurdles event at the 1927 AAA Championships and the 1928 AAA Championships.

Livingstone-Learmonth died of meningitis aged 25 while on a diplomatic mission in Sudan. His grandfather was Thomas Livingstone Learmonth, an early European settler of Australia.
